= List of members of the 14th National Assembly of Pakistan =

14th National Assembly
←	13th National Assembly	15th National Assembly	→
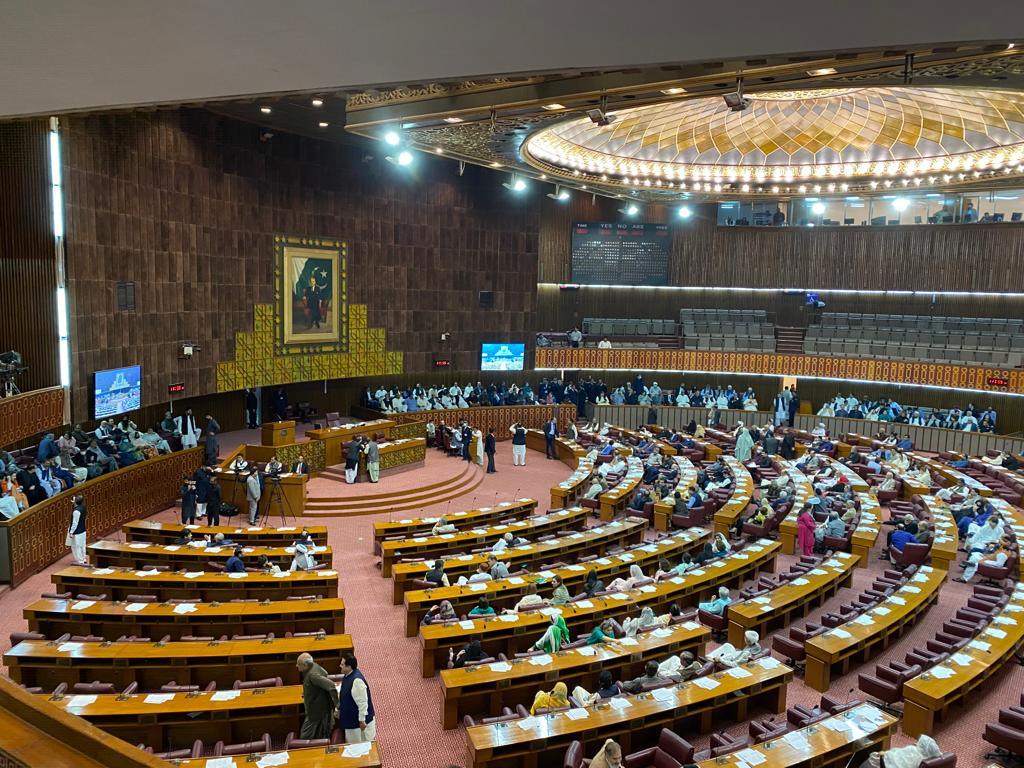

Overview
- Legislative body: National Assembly of Pakistan
- Jurisdiction: Pakistan
- Meeting place: Parliament House, Islamabad-44030
- Term: 2013 – 2018
- Election: 2013 Pakistani general election
- Government: Government of Pakistan
- Website: Official website

National Assembly of Pakistan
- Members: 342
- Speaker: Fahmida Mirza; Ayaz Sadiq
- Prime Minister: Nawaz Sharif; Shahid Khaqan Abbasi
- Leader of the Opposition: Khurshid Shah
- President: Asif Ali Zardari; Mamnoon Hussain

Party	Seats	Party	Seats
PML (N)	182	ANP	2
PPP	46	PML (Z)	1
PTI	32	NP	1
MQM-L	24	AML	1
JUI (F)	15	QWP	1
PML (F)	5	BNP	1
JI	4	AJIP	1
PkMAP	3	APML	1
PML (Q)	2	Independents	10
NPP	2	Total = 332	

The 14th National Assembly of Pakistan was the legislature of Pakistan following the 2013 general election of members of parliament (MPs) to the National Assembly of Pakistan, the lower house of the bicameral Majlis-e-Shura. The National Assembly is a democratically elected body consisting of 342 members, who are referred to as Members of the National Assembly (MNAs), of which 272 are directly elected members; 70 reserved seats for women and religious minorities are allocated to the political parties according to their proportion of the total vote.

The election saw each of Parliament's 272 geographical constituencies return one MP to the National Assembly. It resulted in a Pakistan Muslim League (N) (PML-N) majority, and a massive loss of seats for the Pakistan Peoples Party (PPP). The PML-N became the single largest party, though without an overall majority. The PML-N won 163 seats in the National Assembly. This resulted in a hung parliament. A coalition agreement was formed following negotiations with independent candidates who joined the PML-N, allowing the party to form a simple majority government by bringing on-board nineteen independent candidates, thirteen more than the minimum required to form a government. This swing resulted in Nawaz Sharif becoming the new prime minister of Pakistan for the third time. Syed Khurshid Ahmed Shah won a PPP leadership vote to succeed Nisar Ali Khan as permanent Leader of the Opposition. Ayaz Sadiq and Murtaza Javed Abbasi of PML-N were elected as the legislature's speaker and deputy speaker, respectively.

Members of the 14th National Assembly took an oath on 1 June 2013, and marked the constitutional transition of power from one democratically elected government to another for the first time in the history of Pakistan.

In July 2017, the Supreme Court of Pakistan disqualified Prime Minister Nawaz Sharif from holding membership in the National Assembly following an investigation on corruption allegations regarding his family's wealth, forcing him to resign as prime minister. Shahid Khaqan Abbasi was elected by the National Assembly as the new prime minister on 1 August 2017. The 14th National Assembly was dissolved on 31 May 2018 after completing its five-year constitutional term.

== Members ==
Region	Constituency	Member	Political party	Assumed office	Ref.
Khyber Pakhtunkhwa	NA-1 (Peshawar-I)	Ghulam Ahmad Bilour (Note: Was elected in by-election after seat become vacant.)	Awami National Party	30 August 2013	
Khyber Pakhtunkhwa	NA-2 (Peshawar-II)	Hamid-ul-Haq	Pakistan Tehreek-e-Insaf	1 June 2013	
Khyber Pakhtunkhwa	NA-3 (Peshawar-III)	Sajid Nawaz	Pakistan Tehreek-e-Insaf	1 June 2013	
Khyber Pakhtunkhwa	NA-4 (Peshawar-IV)	Arbab Amir Ayub	Pakistan Tehreek-e-Insaf	2 November 2017	
Khyber Pakhtunkhwa	NA-5 (Nowshera-I)	Imran Khattak	Pakistan Tehreek-e-Insaf	23 September 2013	
Khyber Pakhtunkhwa	NA-6 (Nowshera-II)	Siraj Muhammad Khan	Pakistan Tehreek-e-Insaf	1 June 2013	
Khyber Pakhtunkhwa	NA-7 (Charsadda-I)	Muhammad Gohar Shah	Jamiat Ulema-e-Islam	1 June 2013	
Khyber Pakhtunkhwa	NA-8 (Charsadda-II)	Aftab Ahmad Khan Sherpao	Qaumi Watan Party	1 June 2013	
Khyber Pakhtunkhwa	NA-9 (Mardan-I)	Ameer Haider Khan Hoti	Awami National Party	1 June 2013	
Khyber Pakhtunkhwa	NA-10 (Mardan-II)	Ali Muhammad Khan	Pakistan Tehreek-e-Insaf	1 June 2013	
Khyber Pakhtunkhwa	NA-11 (Mardan-III)	Mujahid Ali	Pakistan Tehreek-e-Insaf	1 June 2013	
Khyber Pakhtunkhwa	NA-12 (Swabi-I)	Usman Khan Tarrakai	Awami Jamhuri Ittehad Pakistan	1 June 2013	
Khyber Pakhtunkhwa	NA-13 (Swabi-II)	Aqibullah	Pakistan Tehreek-e-Insaf	30 August 2013	
Khyber Pakhtunkhwa	NA-14 (Kohat)	Shehryar Khan Afridi	Pakistan Tehreek-e-Insaf	1 June 2013	
Khyber Pakhtunkhwa	NA-15 (Karak)	Nasir Khan Khattak	Pakistan Tehreek-e-Insaf	1 June 2013	
Khyber Pakhtunkhwa	NA-16 (Hangu)	Khial Zaman Orakzai	Pakistan Tehreek-e-Insaf	1 June 2013	
Khyber Pakhtunkhwa	NA-17 (Abbottabad-I)	Muhammad Azhar Jadoon	Pakistan Tehreek-e-Insaf	1 June 2013	
Khyber Pakhtunkhwa	NA-18 (Abbottabad-II)	Murtaza Javed Abbasi	Pakistan Muslim League	1 June 2013	
Khyber Pakhtunkhwa	NA-19 (Haripur)	Babar Nawaz Khan	Pakistan Muslim League	6 November 2015	
Khyber Pakhtunkhwa	NA-20 (Mansehra-I)	Sardar Muhammad Yousuf	Pakistan Muslim League	1 June 2013	
Khyber Pakhtunkhwa	NA-21 (Mansehra-cum-Tor Ghar)	Muhammad Safdar Awan	Pakistan Muslim League	1 June 2013	
Khyber Pakhtunkhwa	NA-22 (Battagram)	Qari Muhammad Yousuf	Jamiat Ulema-e-Islam	1 June 2013	
Khyber Pakhtunkhwa	NA-23 (Kohistan)	Sar Zamin Khan	Pakistan Muslim League	1 June 2013	
Khyber Pakhtunkhwa	NA-24 (Dera Ismail Khan)	Fazl-ur-Rehman	Jamiat Ulema-e-Islam	5 June 2013	
Khyber Pakhtunkhwa	NA-25 (Dera Ismail Khan-cum-Tank)	Dawar Khan Kundi	Pakistan Tehreek-e-Insaf	25 September 2013	
Khyber Pakhtunkhwa	NA-26 (Bannu)	Akram Khan Durrani	Jamiat Ulema-e-Islam	1 June 2013	
Khyber Pakhtunkhwa	NA-27 (Lakki Marwat)	Amirullah Marwat	Pakistan Tehreek-e-Insaf	26 September 2013	
Khyber Pakhtunkhwa	NA-28 (Buner)	Sher Akbar Khan	Jamaat-e-Islami Pakistan	1 June 2013	
Khyber Pakhtunkhwa	NA-29 (Swat-I)	Murad Saeed	Pakistan Tehreek-e-Insaf	1 June 2013	
Khyber Pakhtunkhwa	NA-30 (Swat-II)	Salim Rehman	Pakistan Tehreek-e-Insaf	1 June 2013	
Khyber Pakhtunkhwa	NA-31 (Shangla)	Ibad Ullah	Pakistan Muslim League	1 June 2013	
Khyber Pakhtunkhwa	NA-32 (Chitral)	Shahzada Iftikhar Uddin	All Pakistan Muslim League	1 June 2013	
Khyber Pakhtunkhwa	NA-33 (Upper Dir-cum-Lower Dir)	Sahabzada Tariq Ullah	Jamaat-e-Islami Pakistan	1 June 2013	
Khyber Pakhtunkhwa	NA-34 (Lower Dir)	Sahibzada Muhammad Yaqoob	Jamaat-e-Islami Pakistan	1 June 2013	
Khyber Pakhtunkhwa	NA-35 (Malakand)	Junaid Akbar	Pakistan Tehreek-e-Insaf	1 June 2013	
FATA	NA-36 (Mohmand Agency)	Bilal Rehman	Independent	1 June 2013	
FATA	NA-37 (Kurram Agency)	Sajid Hussain	Independent	1 June 2013	
FATA	NA-38 (Kurram Agency)	—	—	—	
FATA	NA-39 (Orakzai Agency)	Ghazi Ghulab Jamal	Independent	1 June 2013	
FATA	NA-40 (North Waziristan Agency)	Muhammad Nazeer Khan	Pakistan Muslim League	1 June 2013	
FATA	NA-41 (South Waziristan Agency)	Ghalib Khan	Pakistan Muslim League	1 June 2013	
FATA	NA-42 (South Waziristan Agency)	Muhammad Jamal ud Din	Jamiat Ulema-e-Islam	1 June 2013	
FATA	NA-43 (Bajaur Agency)	Bismillah Khan	Independent	1 June 2013	
FATA	NA-44 (Bajaur Agency)	Shahab Uddin	Pakistan Muslim League	1 June 2013	
FATA	NA-45 (Khyber Agency)	Alhaj Shah Gee Gul Afridi	Independent	1 June 2013	
FATA	NA-46 (Khyber Agency)	Nasir Khan (Note: Was disqualified. Retained the seat later in by-election.)	Independent	12 June 2013	
FATA	NA-47 (Frontier Regions)	Qaiser Jamal	Pakistan Tehreek-e-Insaf	1 June 2013	
Islamabad	NA-48 (Islamabad-I)	Asad Umar	Pakistan Tehreek-e-Insaf	16 September 2013	
Islamabad	NA-49 (Islamabad-II)	Tariq Fazal Chaudhry	Pakistan Muslim League	1 June 2013	
Punjab	NA-50 (Rawalpindi-I)	Shahid Khaqan Abbasi	Pakistan Muslim League	1 June 2013	
Punjab	NA-51 (Rawalpindi-II)	Muhammad Javed Ikhlas	Pakistan Muslim League	1 June 2013	
Punjab	NA-52 (Rawalpindi-III)	Chaudhry Nisar Ali Khan	Pakistan Muslim League	1 June 2013	
Punjab	NA-53 (Rawalpindi-IV)	Ghulam Sarwar Khan	Pakistan Tehreek-e-Insaf	1 June 2013	
Punjab	NA-54 (Rawalpindi-V)	Malik Ibrar Ahmed	Pakistan Muslim League	1 June 2013	
Punjab	NA-55 (Rawalpindi-VI)	Sheikh Rasheed Ahmad	Awami Muslim League	1 June 2013	
Punjab	NA-56 (Rawalpindi-VII)	Imran Khan	Pakistan Tehreek-e-Insaf	19 June 2013	
Punjab	NA-57 (Attock-I)	Sheikh Aftab Ahmed	Pakistan Muslim League	19 June 2013	
Punjab	NA-58 (Attock-II)	Malik Ihtebar Khan	Pakistan Muslim League	1 June 2013	
Punjab	NA-59 (Attock-III)	Muhammad Zain Elahi	Independent	1 June 2013	
Punjab	NA-60 (Chakwal-I)	Tahir Iqbal	Pakistan Muslim League	1 June 2013	
Punjab	NA-61 (Chakwal-II)	Sardar Mumtaz Khan	Pakistan Muslim League	1 June 2013	
Punjab	NA-62 (Jhelum-I)	Chaudhry Khadim Hussain	Pakistan Muslim League	1 June 2013	
Punjab	NA-63 (Jhelum-II)	Nawabzada Raja Matloob Mehdi	Pakistan Muslim League	8 September 2016	
Punjab	NA-64 (Sargodha-I)	Muhammad Amin Ul Hasnat Shah	Pakistan Muslim League	1 June 2013	
Punjab	NA-65 (Sargodha-II)	Mohsin Shahnawaz Ranjha	Pakistan Muslim League	1 June 2013	
Punjab	NA-66 (Sargodha-III)	Chaudhry Hamid Hameed	Pakistan Muslim League	1 June 2013	
Punjab	NA-67 (Sargodha-IV)	Zulfiqar Ali Bhatti	Pakistan Muslim League	1 June 2013	
Punjab	NA-68 (Sargodha-V)	Sardar Shafqat Hayat Khan	Pakistan Muslim League	30 August 2013	
Punjab	NA-69 (Khushab-I)	Uzair Khan	Pakistan Muslim League	27 January 2014	
Punjab	NA-70 (Khushab-II)	Malik Shakir Bashir Awan	Pakistan Muslim League	1 June 2013	
Punjab	NA-71 (Mianwali-I)	Obaidullah Shadikhel	Pakistan Muslim League	30 August 2013	
Punjab	NA-72 (Mianwali-II)	Amjad Ali	Pakistan Tehreek-e-Insaf	1 June 2013	
Punjab	NA-73 (Bhakkar-I)	Abdul Majeed Khan	Pakistan Muslim League	1 June 2013	
Punjab	NA-74 (Bhakkar-II)	Muhammad Afzal Khan Dhandla	Pakistan Muslim League	1 June 2013	
Punjab	NA-75 (Faisalabad-I)	Ghulam Rasool Sahi	Pakistan Muslim League	1 June 2013	
Punjab	NA-76 (Faisalabad-II)	Muhammad Tallal Chaudhry	Pakistan Muslim League	1 June 2013	
Punjab	NA-77 (Faisalabad-III)	Muhammad Asim Nazir	Pakistan Muslim League	1 June 2013	
Punjab	NA-78 (Faisalabad-IV)				
Punjab	NA-79 (Faisalabad-V)	Chaudhry Shehbaz Babar	Pakistan Muslim League	1 June 2013	
Punjab	NA-80 (Faisalabad-VI)	Mian Muhammad Farooq	Pakistan Muslim League	1 June 2013	
Punjab	NA-81 (Faisalabad-VII)	Nisar Ahmad Jutt	Pakistan Muslim League	1 June 2013	
Punjab	NA-82 (Faisalabad-VIII)	Rana Afzal Khan	Pakistan Muslim League	1 June 2013	
Punjab	NA-83 (Faisalabad-IX)	Mian Abdul Manan (Note: Elected in by-election as election was terminated in this constituency due to the death of a contesting candidate.)	Pakistan Muslim League	30 August 2013	
Punjab	NA-84 (Faisalabad-X)	Abid Sher Ali	Pakistan Muslim League	1 June 2013	
Punjab	NA-85 (Faisalabad-XI)	Akram Ansari	Pakistan Muslim League	1 June 2013	
Punjab	NA-86 (Chiniot-I)	Qaiser Ahmed Sheikh	Pakistan Muslim League	1 June 2013	
Punjab	NA-87 (Chiniot-II-cum-Jhang)	Ghulam Muhammad Lali	Pakistan Muslim League	1 June 2013	
Punjab	NA-88 (Jhang-cum-Chiniot)	Ghulam Bibi Bharwana	Pakistan Muslim League	1 June 2013	
Punjab	NA-89 (Jhang-I)	Sheikh Muhammad Akram	Pakistan Muslim League	1 June 2013	
Punjab	NA-90 (Jhang-II)	Sahibzada Muhammad Nazeer Sultan	Pakistan Muslim League	1 June 2013	
Punjab	NA-91 (Jhang-III)	Najaf Abbas Sial	Pakistan Muslim League	1 June 2013	
Punjab	NA-92 (Toba Tek Singh-I)	Chaudhary Khalid Javed	Pakistan Muslim League	1 June 2013	
Punjab	NA-93 (Toba Tek Singh-II)	Muhammad Junaid Anwar Chaudhry	Pakistan Muslim League	1 June 2013	
Punjab	NA-94 (Toba Tek Singh-III)	Asad Ur Rehman	Pakistan Muslim League	1 June 2013	
Punjab	NA-95 (Gujranwala-I)	Usman Ibrahim	Pakistan Muslim League	1 June 2013	
Punjab	NA-96 (Gujranwala-II)	Khurram Dastgir Khan	Pakistan Muslim League	1 June 2013	
Punjab	NA-97 (Gujranwala-III)	Chaudhry Mehmood Bashir	Pakistan Muslim League	1 June 2013	
Punjab	NA-98 (Gujranwala-IV)				
Punjab	NA-99 (Gujranwala-V)	Rana Umar Nazir Khan	Pakistan Muslim League	1 June 2013	
Punjab	NA-100 (Gujranwala-VI)	Azhar Qayyum	Pakistan Muslim League	1 June 2013	
Punjab	NA-101 (Gujranwala-VII)	Iftikhar Cheema	Pakistan Muslim League	7 April 2016	
Punjab	NA-102 (Hafizabad-I)	Saira Afzal Tarar	Pakistan Muslim League	1 June 2013	
Punjab	NA-103 (Hafizabad-II)	Shahid Hussain Bhatti	Pakistan Muslim League	16 September 2013	
Punjab	NA-104 (Gujrat-I)	Mazhar Ali	Pakistan Muslim League	1 June 2013	
Punjab	NA-105 (Gujrat-II)	Chaudhry Pervaiz Elahi	Pakistan Muslim League	1 June 2013	
Punjab	NA-106 (Gujrat-III)	Chaudhry Jaffar Iqbal	Pakistan Muslim League	1 June 2013	
Punjab	NA-107 (Gujrat-IV)	Chaudhry Abid Raza	Pakistan Muslim League	1 June 2013	
Punjab	NA-108 (Mandi Bahauddin-I)	Mumtaz Ahmed Tarar	Pakistan Muslim League	17 June 2015	
Punjab	NA-109 (Mandi Bahauddin-II)	Nasir Iqbal Bosal	Pakistan Muslim League	1 June 2013	
Punjab	NA-110 (Sialkot-I)				
Punjab	NA-111 (Sialkot-II)	Armaghan Subhani	Pakistan Muslim League	1 June 2013	
Punjab	NA-112 (Sialkot-III)	Shamim Ahmed	Pakistan Muslim League	1 June 2013	
Punjab	NA-113 (Sialkot-IV)	Syed Iftikhar Ul Hassan	Pakistan Muslim League	1 June 2013	
Punjab	NA-114 (Sialkot-V)	Zahid Hamid	Pakistan Muslim League	1 June 2013	
Punjab	NA-115 (Narowal-I)	Mian Muhammad Rashid	Pakistan Muslim League	1 June 2013	
Punjab	NA-116 (Narowal-II)	Daniyal Aziz	Pakistan Muslim League	1 June 2013	
Punjab	NA-117 (Narowal-III)	Ahsan Iqbal	Pakistan Muslim League	1 June 2013	
Punjab	NA-118 (Lahore-I)	Muhammad Malik Riaz	Pakistan Muslim League	1 June 2013	
Punjab	NA-119 (Lahore-II)	Hamza Shahbaz Sharif	Pakistan Muslim League	1 June 2013	
Punjab	NA-120 (Lahore-III)				
Punjab	NA-121 (Lahore-IV)	Mehr Ishtiaq Ahmed	Pakistan Muslim League	1 June 2013	
Punjab	NA-122 (Lahore-V)	Ayaz Sadiq	Pakistan Muslim League	6 November 2015	
Punjab	NA-123 (Lahore-VI)	Muhammad Pervaiz Malik	Pakistan Muslim League	1 June 2013	
Punjab	NA-124 (Lahore-VII)	Sheikh Rohail Asghar	Pakistan Muslim League	1 June 2013	
Punjab	NA-125 (Lahore-VIII)	Khawaja Saad Rafique	Pakistan Muslim League	1 June 2013	
Punjab	NA-126 (Lahore-IX)	Shafqat Mahmood	Pakistan Tehreek-e-Insaf	1 June 2013	
Punjab	NA-127 (Lahore-X)	Waheed Alam Khan	Pakistan Muslim League	1 June 2013	
Punjab	NA-128 (Lahore-XI)	Afzal Khokhar	Pakistan Muslim League	1 June 2013	
Punjab	NA-129 (Lahore-XII)	Shazia Mubashar	Pakistan Muslim League	16 September 2013	
Punjab	NA-130 (Lahore-XIII)	Sohail Shaukat Butt	Pakistan Muslim League	1 June 2013	
Punjab	NA-131 (Sheikhupura-I)	Rana Afzal	Pakistan Muslim League	1 June 2013	
Punjab	NA-132 (Sheikhupura-II-cum-Nankana Sahib)	Rana Tanveer Hussain	Pakistan Muslim League	1 June 2013	
Punjab	NA-133 (Sheikhupura-III)	Mian Javed Latif	Pakistan Muslim League	1 June 2013	
Punjab	NA-134 (Sheikhupura-IV)	Muhammad Irfan Dogar	Pakistan Muslim League	1 June 2013	
Punjab	NA-135 (Nankana Sahib-I-cum-Sheikhupura)	Chaudhry Muhammad Barjees Tahir	Pakistan Muslim League	1 June 2013	
Punjab	NA-136 (Nankana Sahib-II-cum-Sheikhupura )	Choudhry Bilal Ahmed	Pakistan Muslim League	1 June 2013	
Punjab	NA-137 (Nankana Sahib-III)	Shizra Mansab Ali Khan	Pakistan Muslim League	24 March 2015	
Punjab	NA-138 (Kasur-I-cum-Lahore)	Salman Haneef	Pakistan Muslim League	1 June 2013	
Punjab	NA-139 (Kasur-II)	Waseem Akhtar Shaikh	Pakistan Muslim League	1 June 2013	
Punjab	NA-140 (Kasur-III)	Malik Rasheed Ahmed Khan	Pakistan Muslim League	1 June 2013	
Punjab	NA-141 (Kasur-IV)	Rana Muhammad Ishaq	Pakistan Muslim League	1 June 2013	
Punjab	NA-142 (Kasur-V)	Rana Muhammad Hayat	Pakistan Muslim League	1 June 2013	
Punjab	NA-143 (Okara-I)	Chaudhry Nadeem Abbas	Pakistan Muslim League	1 June 2013	
Punjab	NA-144 (Okara-II)	Chaudhry Riaz-ul-Haq	Pakistan Muslim League	6 November 2015	
Punjab	NA-145 (Okara-III)	Ashiq Husain Khan	Pakistan Muslim League	1 June 2013	
Punjab	NA-146 (Okara-IV)	Rao Muhammad Ajmal Khan	Pakistan Muslim League	1 June 2013	
Punjab	NA-147 (Okara-V)	Muhammad Moeen Wattoo	Pakistan Muslim League	1 June 2013	
Punjab	NA-148 (Multan-I)	Malik Abdul Gafar Dogar	Pakistan Muslim League	1 June 2013	
Punjab	NA-149 (Multan-II)	Malik Aamir Dogar	Independent	27 October 2014	
Punjab	NA-150 (Multan-III)	Shah Mehmood Qureshi	Pakistan Tehreek-e-Insaf	3 June 2013	
Punjab	NA-151 (Multan-IV)	Sikandar Hayat Bosan	Pakistan Muslim League	1 June 2013	
Punjab	NA-152 (Multan-V)	Syed Javed Ali Shah	Pakistan Muslim League	1 June 2013	
Punjab	NA-153 (Multan-VI)				
Punjab	NA-154 (Lodhran-I)	Muhammad Iqbal Shah	Pakistan Muslim League	19 February 2018	
Punjab	NA-155 (Lodhran-II)	Abdul Rehman Khan Kanju	Pakistan Muslim League	1 June 2013	
Punjab	NA-156 (Khanewal-I)	Riyaz Hayat Hiraj	Pakistan Muslim League	1 June 2013	
Punjab	NA-157 (Khanewal-II)	Muhammad Khan Daha	Pakistan Muslim League	1 June 2013	
Punjab	NA-158 (Khanewal-III)	Aslam Bodla	Pakistan Muslim League	1 June 2013	
Punjab	NA-159 (Khanewal-IV)	Chaudhry Iftikhar Nazir	Pakistan Muslim League	1 June 2013	
Punjab	NA-160 (Sahiwal-I)	Syed Imran Ahmed	Pakistan Muslim League	1 June 2013	
Punjab	NA-161 (Sahiwal-II)	Chaudhry Muhammad Ashraf	Pakistan Muslim League	1 June 2013	
Punjab	NA-162 (Sahiwal-III)	Chaudhary Muhammad Tufail	Pakistan Muslim League	29 September 2016	
Punjab	NA-163 (Sahiwal-IV)	Muhammad Munir Azhar	Pakistan Muslim League	1 June 2013	
Punjab	NA-164 (Pakpattan-I)	Sardar Mansab Ali Dogar	Pakistan Muslim League	1 June 2013	
Punjab	NA-165 (Pakpattan-II)	Syed Athar Hussain Gilani	Pakistan Muslim League	1 June 2013	
Punjab	NA-166 (Pakpattan-III)	Rana Zahid Hussain	Pakistan Muslim League	1 June 2013	
Punjab	NA-167 (Vehari-I)	Chaudhry Nazeer Ahmad	Pakistan Muslim League	1 June 2013	
Punjab	NA-168 (Vehari-II)	Syed Sajid Mehdi	Pakistan Muslim League	1 June 2013	
Punjab	NA-169 (Vehari-III)	Tahir Iqbal Chaudhry	Pakistan Muslim League	1 June 2013	
Punjab	NA-170 (Vehari-IV)	Saeed Ahmed Khan	Pakistan Muslim League	1 June 2013	
Punjab	NA-171 (Dera Ghazi Khan-I)	Muhammad Amjad Farooq	Pakistan Muslim League	1 June 2013	
Punjab	NA-172 (Dera Ghazi Khan-II)	—	—	—	
Punjab	NA-173 (Dera Ghazi Khan-III)	Awais Leghari	Pakistan Muslim League	1 June 2013	
Punjab	NA-174 (Rajanpur-I)	Muhammad Jaffar Khan	Pakistan Muslim League	1 June 2013	
Punjab	NA-175 (Rajanpur-II)	Hafeez Ur Rehman	Pakistan Muslim League	1 June 2013	
Punjab	NA-176 (Muzaffargarh-I)	Sultan Mehmood	Pakistan Muslim League	1 June 2013	
Punjab	NA-177 (Muzaffargarh-II)	Ghulam Noor Rabbani Khar	Pakistan Peoples Party	16 September 2013	
Punjab	NA-178 (Muzaffargarh-III)	Jamshed Dasti	Independent	3 June 2013	
Punjab	NA-179 (Muzaffargarh-IV)				
Punjab	NA-180 (Muzaffargarh-V)	Sardar Ashiq Hussain	Pakistan Muslim League	1 June 2013	
Punjab	NA-181 (Layyah-I)	Faiz Ul Hassan	Pakistan Muslim League	1 June 2013	
Punjab	NA-182 (Layyah-II)	Syed Muhammad Saqlain	Pakistan Muslim League	1 June 2013	
Punjab	NA-183 (Bhawalpur-I)	Syed Ali Hassan Gilani	Pakistan Muslim League	1 June 2013	
Punjab	NA-184 (Bahawalpur-II)	Najibuddin Awaisi	Pakistan Muslim League	1 June 2013	
Punjab	NA-185 (Bahawalpur-III)	Muhammad Baligh Ur Rehman	Pakistan Muslim League	1 June 2013	
Punjab	NA-186 (Bahawalpur-IV)	Riaz Hussain Pirzada	Pakistan Muslim League	1 June 2013	
Punjab	NA-187 (Bahawalpur-V)	Tariq Bashir Cheema	Pakistan Muslim League	1 June 2013	
Punjab	NA-188 (Bahawalnager-I)	Syed Muhammad Asghar Shah	Pakistan Muslim League	1 June 2013	
Punjab	NA-189 (Bahawalnager-II)	Alam Dad Lalika	Pakistan Muslim League	1 June 2013	
Punjab	NA-190 (Bahawalnagar-III)	Tahir Bashir Cheema	Pakistan Muslim League	1 June 2013	
Punjab	NA-191 (Bahawalnagar-IV)	Ijaz-ul-Haq	Pakistan Muslim League	1 June 2013	
Punjab	NA-192 (Rahim Yar Khan-I)	Khwaja Ghulam Rasool Koreja	Pakistan Peoples Party	1 June 2013	
Punjab	NA-193 (Rahim Yar Khan-II)	Sheikh Fayyaz Ud Din	Pakistan Muslim League	1 June 2013	
Punjab	NA-194 (Rahim Yar Khan-III)				
Punjab	NA-195 (Rahim Yar Khan-IV)	Mustafa Mehmood	Pakistan Peoples Party	1 June 2013	
Punjab	NA-196 (Rahim Yar Khan-V)	Mian Imtiaz Ahmed	Pakistan Muslim League	1 June 2013	
Punjab	NA-197 (Rahim Yar Khan-VI)	Muhammad Arshad Khan Leghari	Pakistan Muslim League	1 June 2013	
Sindh	NA-198 (Sukkur-cum-Shikarpur-I)	Nauman Islam Shaikh	Pakistan Peoples Party	1 June 2013	
Sindh	NA-199 (Sukkur-cum-Shikarpur-II)	Syed Khurshid Ahmed Shah	Pakistan Peoples Party	1 June 2013	
Sindh	NA-200 (Ghotki-I)	Ali Gohar Mehr	Pakistan Peoples Party	1 June 2013	
Sindh	NA-201 (Ghotki-II)	Ali Mohammad Mahar	Pakistan Peoples Party	1 June 2013	
Sindh	NA-202 (Shikarpur)	Aftab Shaban Mirani	Pakistan Peoples Party	12 May 2014	
Sindh	NA-203 (Sheikhupur-Cum-Sukkur-Cum-Larkana)	Ghos Bakhsh Khan Mahar	Pakistan Muslim League	1 June 2013	
Sindh	NA-204 (Larkana)				
Sindh	NA-205 (Larkana-cum-Qambar Shahdadkot)	Nazeer Ahmed Baghio	Pakistan Peoples Party	1 June 2013	
Sindh	NA-206 (Qambar Shahdadkot)	Mir Aamir Ali	Pakistan Peoples Party	1 June 2013	
Sindh	NA-207 (Larkana-cum-Sheikhupur-cum-Qambar Shahdadkot)	Faryal Talpur	Pakistan Peoples Party	1 June 2013	
Sindh	NA-208 (Jacobabad)	Mir Ejaz Khan Jakhrani	Pakistan Peoples Party	1 June 2013	
Sindh	NA-209 (Jacobabad-cum-Kashmore)	Mir Shabbir Ali	Pakistan Peoples Party	1 June 2013	
Sindh	NA-210 (Kashmore)	Ahsan ur Rehman Mazari	Pakistan Peoples Party	1 June 2013	
Sindh	NA-211 (Naushero Feroze-I)	Ghulam Murtaza Khan Jatoi	National Peoples Party	1 June 2013	
Sindh	NA-212 (Naushero Feroze-II)	Asghar Ali Shah	Pakistan Peoples Party	1 June 2013	
Sindh	NA-213 (Nawabshah-I)	Azra Peechoho	Pakistan Peoples Party	1 June 2013	
Sindh	NA-214 (Nawabshah-II)	Syed Gulam Mustafa Shah	Pakistan Peoples Party	1 June 2013	
Sindh	NA-215 (Khairpur-I)	Nawab Ali Wassan	Pakistan Peoples Party	1 June 2013	
Sindh	NA-216 (Khairpur-II)	Pir Sadaruddin Shah	Pakistan Muslim League	1 June 2013	
Sindh	NA-217 (Khairpur-III)	Syed Kazim Ali	Pakistan Muslim League	1 June 2013	
Sindh	NA-218 (Matiari-cum-Hyderabad)	Makhdoom Saeeduz Zaman	Pakistan Peoples Party	12 February 2016	
Sindh	NA-219 (Hyderabad-I)	Khalid Maqbool Siddiqui	Muttahida Qaumi Movement – Pakistan	1 June 2013	
Sindh	NA-220 (Hyderabad-II)	Syed Waseem Hussain	Muttahida Qaumi Movement – Pakistan	1 June 2013	
Sindh	NA-221 (Hyderabad-cum-Matiari)	Syed Mir Shah	Pakistan Peoples Party	1 June 2013	
Sindh	NA-222 (Tando Muhammad Khan-cum-Hyderabad-cum-Badin)	Naveed Qamar	Pakistan Peoples Party	1 June 2013	
Sindh	NA-223 (Tando Allahyar-cum-Matiari)	Haji Abdul Sattar	Pakistan Peoples Party	1 June 2013	
Sindh	NA-224 (Badin-cum-Tando Muhammad Khan-I)	Sardar Kamal Khan	Pakistan Peoples Party	1 June 2013	
Sindh	NA-225 (Badin-cum-Tando Muhammad Khan-II)	Fehmida Mirza	Pakistan Peoples Party	1 June 2013	
Sindh	NA-226 (Mirpur Khas-cum-Umerkot-I)	Hussain Shah Jilani	Pakistan Peoples Party	1 June 2013	
Sindh	NA-227 (Mirpur Khas-cum-Umerkot-II)	Mir Munawar Ali	Pakistan Peoples Party	3 June 2013	
Sindh	NA-228 (Umerkot)	Nawab Muhammad Yousuf	Pakistan Peoples Party	1 June 2013	
Sindh	NA-229 (Tharparkar-I)	Fakeer Sher Muhammad Bilalani	Pakistan Peoples Party	5 June 2013	
Sindh	NA-230 (Tharparkar-II)	Pir Noor Muhammad Shah Jeelani	Pakistan Peoples Party	5 June 2013	
Sindh	NA-231 (Jamshoro)	Asad Sikandar	Pakistan Peoples Party	1 June 2013	
Sindh	NA-232 (Dadu-I)	Rafiq Ahmed Jamali	Pakistan Peoples Party	1 June 2013	
Sindh	NA-233 (Dadu-II)	Imran Zafar	Pakistan Peoples Party	1 June 2013	
Sindh	NA-234 (Sanghar-I)	Pir Baksh Junejo	Pakistan Muslim League	1 June 2013	
Sindh	NA-235 (Sanghar-cum-Mirpurkhas-cum-Umerkot)	Shazia Marri	Pakistan Peoples Party	30 August 2013	
Sindh	NA-236 (Sanghar-II)	Roshan Din Junejo	Pakistan Peoples Party	3 June 2013	
Sindh	NA-237 (Thatta-I)	Shamas-un-Nisa	Pakistan Peoples Party	30 August 2013	
Sindh	NA-238 (Thatta-II)	Syed Ayaz Ali Shah Sheerazi	Pakistan Muslim League	1 June 2013	
Sindh	NA-239 (Karachi-I)	Mohammad Salman Khan Baloch	Muttahida Qaumi Movement – Pakistan	1 June 2013	
Sindh	NA-240 (Karachi-II)	Khuwaja Sohail Mansoor	Muttahida Qaumi Movement – Pakistan	1 June 2013	
Sindh	NA-241 (Karachi-III)	Iqbal Qadri	Muttahida Qaumi Movement – Pakistan	1 June 2013	
Sindh	NA-242 (Karachi-IV)	Mahboob Alam	Muttahida Qaumi Movement – Pakistan	1 June 2013	
Sindh	NA-243 (Karachi-V)	Abdul Waseem	Muttahida Qaumi Movement – Pakistan	1 June 2013	
Sindh	NA-244 (Karachi-VI)	Sheikh Salahuddin	Muttahida Qaumi Movement – Pakistan	1 June 2013	
Sindh	NA-245 (Karachi-VII)	Muhammad Kamal Malik	Muttahida Qaumi Movement – Pakistan	9 May 2016	
Sindh	NA-246 (Karachi-VIII)	Kunwar Naveed Jamil	Muttahida Qaumi Movement – Pakistan	29 April 2015	
Sindh	NA-247 (Karachi-IX)	Sufiyan Yousuf	Muttahida Qaumi Movement – Pakistan	1 June 2013	
Sindh	NA-248 (Karachi-X)	Shah Jahan Baloch	Pakistan Peoples Party	1 June 2013	
Sindh	NA-249 (Karachi-XI)	Farooq Sattar	Muttahida Qaumi Movement – Pakistan	1 June 2013	
Sindh	NA-250 (Karachi-XII)	Arif Alvi	Pakistan Tehreek-e-Insaf	1 June 2013	
Sindh	NA-251 (Karachi-XIII)	Syed Ali Raza Abidi	Muttahida Qaumi Movement – Pakistan	1 June 2013	
Sindh	NA-252 (Karachi-XIV)	Abdul Rashid Godial	Muttahida Qaumi Movement – Pakistan	1 June 2013	
Sindh	NA-253 (Karachi-XV)	Muhammad Muzammil Qureshi	Muttahida Qaumi Movement – Pakistan	1 June 2013	
Sindh	NA-254 (Karachi-XVI)	Muhammad Ali Rashid	Muttahida Qaumi Movement – Pakistan	16 September 2013	
Sindh	NA-255 (Karachi-XVII)	Syed Asif Husnain	Muttahida Qaumi Movement – Pakistan	1 June 2013	
Sindh	NA-256 (Karachi-XVIII)	Iqbal Muhammad Ali Khan	Muttahida Qaumi Movement – Pakistan	1 June 2013	
Sindh	NA-257 (Karachi-XIX)	Sajid Ahmed	Muttahida Qaumi Movement – Pakistan	1 June 2013	
Sindh	NA-258 (Karachi-XX)	Abdul Hakeem Baloch	Pakistan Peoples Party	14 December 2016	
Balochistan	NA-259 (Quetta)	Mehmood Khan Achakzai	Pashtunkhwa Milli Awami Party	1 June 2013	
Balochistan	NA-260 (Quetta-cum-Chagai-cum-Nushki-cum-Mastung)	Usman Badini	Jamiat Ulema-e-Islam	1 August 2017	
Balochistan	NA-261 (Pishin-cum-Ziarat)	Moulvi Agha Muhammad	Jamiat Ulema-e-Islam	19 December 2013	
Balochistan	NA-262 (Killa Abdullah)	Abdul Qahar Khan Wadan	Pashtunkhwa Milli Awami Party	30 August 2013	
Balochistan	NA-263 (Loralai-cum-Musakhel-cum-Barkhan)	Ameer Zaman	Jamiat Ulema-e-Islam	1 June 2013	
Balochistan	NA-264 (Zhob-cum-Sherani-cum-Killa Saifullah)	Muhammad Khan Sherani	Jamiat Ulema-e-Islam	1 June 2013	
Balochistan	NA-265 (Sibi-cum-Kohlu-cum-Dera Bugti-cum-Harani)	Mir Dostaan Khan Domki	Pakistan Muslim League	1 June 2013	
Balochistan	NA-266 (Nasirabad-cum-Jaffarabad)	Mir Zafarullah Khan Jamali	Pakistan Muslim League	1 June 2013	
Balochistan	NA-267 (Kachhi-cum-Jhal Magsi)	Khalid Hussain Magsi	Pakistan Muslim League	9 May 2016	
Balochistan	NA-268 (Kalat-cum-Mastung)	Sardar Kamal Khan Bangulzai	National Party	1 June 2013	
Balochistan	NA-269 (Khuzdar)	Molana Qamar ud Din	Jamiat Ulema-e-Islam	1 June 2013	
Balochistan	NA-270 (Awaran-cum-Lasbela)	Jam Kamal Khan	Pakistan Muslim League	1 June 2013	
Balochistan	NA-271 (Kharan-cum-Washuk-cum-Panjgur)	Abdul Qadir Baloch	Pakistan Muslim League	1 June 2013	
Balochistan	NA-272 (Kech-cum-Gwadar)	Syed Essa Noori	Balochistan National Party	13 August 2013	

Indirectly elected on reserved seats
Region	Seat	Member	Political party	Assumed office	Ref.
Balochistan	Reserved seats for women	Kiran Haider	Pakistan Muslim League	1 June 2013	
Balochistan	Reserved seats for women	Naseema Hafeez Panezai	Pashtunkhwa Milli Awami Party	1 June 2013	
Balochistan	Reserved seats for women	Aliya Kamran	Jamiat Ulema-e-Islam	1 June 2013	
Khyber Pakhtunkhwa	Reserved seats for women	Ayesha Gulalai	Pakistan Tehreek-e-Insaf	1 June 2013	
Khyber Pakhtunkhwa	Reserved seats for women	Nafeesa Inayatullah Khan Khattak	Pakistan Tehreek-e-Insaf	1 June 2013	
Khyber Pakhtunkhwa	Reserved seats for women	Mussarat Ahmed Zeb	Pakistan Tehreek-e-Insaf	1 June 2013	
Khyber Pakhtunkhwa	Reserved seats for women	Sajida Zulfiqar	Pakistan Tehreek-e-Insaf	1 June 2013	
Khyber Pakhtunkhwa	Reserved seats for women	Shahida Akhtar Ali	Jamiat Ulema-e-Islam	1 June 2013	
Khyber Pakhtunkhwa	Reserved seats for women	Naeema Kishwar Khan	Jamiat Ulema-e-Islam	1 June 2013	
Khyber Pakhtunkhwa	Reserved seats for women	Begum Tahira Bukhari	Pakistan Muslim League	1 June 2013	
Khyber Pakhtunkhwa	Reserved seats for women	Aisha Syed	Jamaat-e-Islami Pakistan	1 June 2013	
Punjab	Reserved seats for women	Anusha Rahman	Pakistan Muslim League	1 June 2013	
Punjab	Reserved seats for women	Zaib Jaffar	Pakistan Muslim League	1 June 2013	
Punjab	Reserved seats for women	Tahira Aurangzeb	Pakistan Muslim League	1 June 2013	
Punjab	Reserved seats for women	Parveen Masood Bhatti	Pakistan Muslim League	1 June 2013	
Punjab	Reserved seats for women	Kiran Imran Dar	Pakistan Muslim League	1 June 2013	
Punjab	Reserved seats for women	Shaista Pervaiz	Pakistan Muslim League	1 June 2013	
Punjab	Reserved seats for women	Nighat Parveen	Pakistan Muslim League	1 June 2013	
Punjab	Reserved seats for women	Begum Majeeda Wyne	Pakistan Muslim League	1 June 2013	
Punjab	Reserved seats for women	Khalida Mansoor	Pakistan Muslim League	1 June 2013	
Punjab	Reserved seats for women	Asyia Naz Tanoli	Pakistan Muslim League	1 June 2013	
Punjab	Reserved seats for women	Rida Khan	Pakistan Muslim League	1 June 2013	
Punjab	Reserved seats for women	Seema Mohiuddin Jameeli	Pakistan Muslim League	1 June 2013	
Punjab	Reserved seats for women	Shahnaz Saleem Malik	Pakistan Muslim League	1 June 2013	
Punjab	Reserved seats for women	Laila Khan	Pakistan Muslim League	1 June 2013	
Punjab	Reserved seats for women	Arifa Khalid Pervaiz	Pakistan Muslim League	1 June 2013	
Punjab	Reserved seats for women	Surriya Asghar	Pakistan Muslim League	1 June 2013	
Punjab	Reserved seats for women	Shahzadi Umerzadi Tiwana	Pakistan Muslim League	1 June 2013	
Punjab	Reserved seats for women	Maiza Hameed	Pakistan Muslim League	1 June 2013	
Punjab	Reserved seats for women	Farhana Qamar	Pakistan Muslim League	1 June 2013	
Punjab	Reserved seats for women	Shaheen Shafiq	Pakistan Muslim League	1 June 2013	
Punjab	Reserved seats for women	Iffat Liaqat	Pakistan Muslim League	1 June 2013	
Punjab	Reserved seats for women	Shazia Ashfaq Mattu	Pakistan Muslim League	1 June 2013	
Punjab	Reserved seats for women	Romina Khurshid Alam	Pakistan Muslim League	1 June 2013	
Punjab	Reserved seats for women	Zuhra Wadood Fatmi	Pakistan Muslim League	3 June 2013	
Punjab	Reserved seats for women	Asma Mamdot	Pakistan Muslim League	3 June 2013	
Punjab	Reserved seats for women	Marriyum Aurangzeb	Pakistan Muslim League	3 June 2013	
Punjab	Reserved seats for women	Sabiha Nadeem	Pakistan Muslim League	3 June 2013	
Punjab	Reserved seats for women	Ammara Khan	Pakistan Muslim League	3 June 2013	
Punjab	Reserved seats for women	Fais Azeem	Pakistan Muslim League	3 June 2013	
Punjab	Reserved seats for women	Shiza Fatima	Pakistan Muslim League	3 June 2013	
Punjab	Reserved seats for women	Tehmina Daultana	Pakistan Muslim League	3 June 2013	
Punjab	Reserved seats for women	Shakila Luqman (Note: Was appointed after seat became vacant.)	Pakistan Muslim League	27 June 2013	
Punjab	Reserved seats for women	Shireen Mehrunnisa Mazari	Pakistan Tehreek-e-Insaf	1 June 2013	
Punjab	Reserved seats for women	Munaza Hassan	Pakistan Tehreek-e-Insaf	1 June 2013	
Punjab	Reserved seats for women	Belum Hasnain	Pakistan Peoples Party	5 June 2013	
Sindh	Reserved seats for women	Suraiya Jatoi	Pakistan Peoples Party	16 September 2013	
Sindh	Reserved seats for women	Shagufta Jumani	Pakistan Peoples Party	3 June 2013	
Sindh	Reserved seats for women	Nafisa Shah	Pakistan Peoples Party	1 June 2013	
Sindh	Reserved seats for women	Mahreen Razaque Bhutto	Pakistan Peoples Party	1 June 2013	
Sindh	Reserved seats for women	Shazia Sobia	Pakistan Peoples Party	6 November 2015	
Sindh	Reserved seats for women	Shahida Rehmani	Pakistan Peoples Party	3 June 2013	
Sindh	Reserved seats for women	Musarat Rafique Mahesar	Pakistan Peoples Party	1 June 2013	
Sindh	Reserved seats for women	Kishwer Zehra	Muttahida Qaumi Movement – Pakistan	1 June 2013	
Sindh	Reserved seats for women	Fouzia Hameed	Muttahida Qaumi Movement – Pakistan	4 August 2014	
Sindh	Reserved seats for women	Saman Sultana Jaffri	Muttahida Qaumi Movement – Pakistan	1 June 2013	
Sindh	Reserved seats for women	Nikhat Shakeel Khan	Muttahida Qaumi Movement – Pakistan	1 June 2013	
Sindh	Reserved seats for women	Reeta Ishwar	Pakistan Muslim League	1 June 2013	
Sindh	Reserved seats for women	Shahjehan	National Peoples Party	1 June 2013	
Sindh	Reserved seats for women	Marvi Memon	Pakistan Muslim League	1 June 2013	
National	Reserved seats for minorities	Darshan	Pakistan Muslim League	1 June 2013	
National	Reserved seats for minorities	Bhawan Das	Pakistan Muslim League	1 June 2013	
National	Reserved seats for minorities	Isphanyar M. Bhandara	Pakistan Muslim League	1 June 2013	
National	Reserved seats for minorities	Ramesh Kumar Vankwani	Pakistan Muslim League	1 June 2013	
National	Reserved seats for minorities	Tariq Christopher Qaiser	Pakistan Muslim League	1 June 2013	
National	Reserved seats for minorities	Khalil Francis	Pakistan Muslim League	1 June 2013	
National	Reserved seats for minorities	Ramesh Lal	Pakistan Peoples Party	1 June 2013	
National	Reserved seats for minorities	Lal Chand	Pakistan Tehreek-e-Insaf	3 June 2013	
National	Reserved seats for minorities	Sanjay Perwani	Muttahida Qaumi Movement – Pakistan	1 June 2013	
National	Reserved seats for minorities	Aasiya Nasir	Jamiat Ulema-e-Islam	1 June 2013	

== Membership changes ==
Region	Constituency	Incumbent elected in 2013 general elections for the 14th National Assembly			Ref.
Region	Constituency	Political party	Member	Notes	Ref.
Khyber Pakhtunkhwa	NA-4 (Peshawar-IV)	Pakistan Tehreek-e-Insaf	Gulzar Khan	Was elected in May 2013. Died while in office in August 2017.	
Khyber Pakhtunkhwa	NA-19 (Haripur)	Pakistan Tehreek-e-Insaf	Raja Aamer Zaman	Was elected in May 2013, but became ineligible to continue in office in 2014 as the constituency election was invalidated due to voting irregularities.	
Khyber Pakhtunkhwa	NA-19 (Haripur)	Pakistan Muslim League (N)	Omar Ayub Khan	Was elected in a by-election in January 2014 after Raja Aamer Zaman was disqualified. Became ineligible to continue in office in June 2015 as the constituency election was invalidated due to voting irregularities.	
Punjab	NA-63 (Jhelum-II)	Pakistan Muslim League (N)	Malik Iqbal Mehdi Khan	Was elected in May 2013. Died while serving in office in May 2016.	
Punjab	NA-69 (Khushab-I)	Pakistan Muslim League (N)	Sumaira Malik	Was elected in May 2013. Was disqualified to continue in office because of a fake degree case in October 2013.	
Punjab	NA-78 (Faisalabad-IV)	Pakistan Muslim League (N)	Rajab Ali Khan	Elected in May 2013. Died in May 2018.	
Punjab	NA-98 (Gujranwala-IV)	Pakistan Muslim League (N)	Mian Tariq Mehmood	Elected in May 2013. He quit PML-N in February 2017 and joined PTI.	
Punjab	NA-103 (Hafizabad-II)	Pakistan Muslim League (Q)	Liaqat Abbas Bhatti	Was elected in May 2013, but became ineligible to continue in office as the constituency election was invalidated due to voting irregularities.	
Punjab	NA-108 (Mandi Bahauddin-I)	Independent	Muhammad Ijaz Ahmed Chaudhary	Was elected in May 2013. Was disqualified to continue in office in April 2015 because of a fake degree case and charges of human smuggling.	
Punjab	NA-110 (Sialkot-I)	Pakistan Muslim League (N)	Khawaja Muhammad Asif	Was elected in May 2013. Was disqualified in April 2018 by the Islamabad High Court for holding the UAE work permit	
Punjab	NA-120 (Lahore-III)	Pakistan Muslim League (N)	Nawaz Sharif	Was elected in May 2013 and became prime minister. The Supreme Court of Pakistan disqualified him in July 2017 from holding public office following an investigation into corruption allegations.	
Punjab	NA-137 (Sheikhupura-VII)	Pakistan Muslim League (N)	Rai Mansab Ali Khan	Was elected in May 2013. Died while serving in office in January 2015.	
Punjab	NA-144 (Okara-II)	Pakistan Muslim League (N)	Muhammad Arif Chaudhry	Was elected in May 2013, but was disqualified to continue in office in August 2015 because of a fake degree case.	
Punjab	NA-149 (Multan-II)	Pakistan Tehreek-e-Insaf	Javed Hashmi	Was elected in May 2013, but vacated the seat in August 2014 after switching parties.	
Punjab	NA-153 (Multan-VI)	Pakistan Muslim League (N)	Syed Ashiq Hussain Bukhari	Was elected in May 2013, but was disqualified to continue in office in September 2014 because of a fake degree case.	
Punjab	NA-153 (Multan-VI)	Pakistan Muslim League (N)	Rana Muhammad Qasim Noon	Was elected in by-election in March 2016. Resigned in April 2018 after quitting PML-N	
Punjab	NA-154 (Lodhran-I)	Pakistan Muslim League (N)	Muhammad Siddique Khan	Was elected in May 2013, but was disqualified to continue in office in October 2015 because of a fake degree case.	
Punjab	NA-154 (Lodhran-I)	Pakistan Tehreek-e-Insaf	Jehangir Khan Tareen	Elected in 2015 by-election. Was disqualified by the Supreme Court in December 2017.	
Punjab	NA-162 (Sahiwal-III)	Pakistan Tehreek-e-Insaf	Rai Hassan Nawaz	Was elected in May 2013, but was disqualified to continue in office in May 2015 because of an inaccurate assets declaration.	
Punjab	NA-172 (D.G.Khan-II)	Pakistan Muslim League (N)	Hafiz Abdul Kareem	Was elected in May 2013. Resigned from the seat to become a member of the Senate of Pakistan in March 2018.	
Punjab	NA-179 (Muzaffargarh-IV)	Pakistan Muslim League (N)	Syed Basit Sultan Bukhari	Was elected in May 2013. Resigned in April 2018 after quitting PML-N	
Punjab	NA-194 (Rahim Yar Khan-III)	Pakistan Muslim League (N)	Makhdoom Khusro Bakhtiar	Was elected in May 2013. Resigned in April 2018 after quitting PML-N	
Sindh	NA-202 (Shikarpur-I)	National Peoples Party (Pakistan)	Muhammad Ibrahim Jatoi	Was elected in May 2013, but became ineligible to continue in office in 2014 as the constituency election was invalidated by voting irregularities.	
Sindh	NA-204 (Larkana-I)	Pakistan Peoples Party	Muhammad Ayaz Soomro	Was elected in May 2013. Died in March 2018.	
Sindh	NA-211 (Naushero Feroze-I)	Pakistan Peoples Party	Zulfiqar Ali Behan	Was declared candidate returned in August 2014. Disqualified in January 2016.	
Sindh	NA-218 (Hyderabad-I)	Pakistan Peoples Party	Ameen Faheem	Was elected in May 2013. Died while serving in office in November 2015.	
Sindh	NA-237 (Thatta-I)	Pakistan Peoples Party	Sadiq Ali Memon	Was elected in May 2013, but was disqualified to continue in office in August 2014 because of a dual nationality case.	
Sindh	NA-245 (Karachi-VII)	Muttahida Qaumi Movement	Muhammad Rehan Hashmi	Was elected in May 2013, but resigned from the seat in 2016 to run in local government elections in Karachi.	
Sindh	NA-246 (Karachi-VIII)	Muttahida Qaumi Movement	Nabil Gabol	Was elected in May 2013, but vacated the seat in February 2015 after switching parties.	
Sindh	NA-258 (Karachi-XX)	Pakistan Muslim League (N)	Abdul Hakeem Baloch	Was elected in May 2013, but vacated the seat in September 2016 after switching parties.	
Balochistan	NA-260 (Quetta-Chagai-Mastung)	Pashtunkhwa Milli Awami Party	Abdul Rahim Mandokhail	Was elected in May 2013. Died while serving in office in May 2017.	
Sindh	Reserved seats for women	Pakistan Peoples Party	Alizeh Iqbal Haider	Was elected on the reserved seats for women in May 2013, but resigned from the seat due to personal issues in November 2015.	
Sindh	Reserved seats for women	Muttahida Qaumi Movement	Tahira Asif	Was elected on the reserved seats for women in May 2013. Assassinated while serving in office in June 2014.	
Sindh	Reserved seats for women	Pakistan Peoples Party	Shazia Marri	Was elected on the reserved seats for women in June 2013. Resigned from the reserved seat to run for a general seat in the by-election in NA-235 (Sanghar-II) in August 2013.	
Punjab	Reserved seats for women	Pakistan Muslim League (N)	Ayesha Raza Farooq	Was elected on the reserved seats for women in May 2013. Resigned from the seat to become a member of the Senate of Pakistan in 2015.	

== See also ==
- List of members of the 1st National Assembly of Pakistan
- List of members of the 2nd National Assembly of Pakistan
- List of members of the 3rd National Assembly of Pakistan
- List of members of the 4th National Assembly of Pakistan
- List of members of the 5th National Assembly of Pakistan
- List of members of the 6th National Assembly of Pakistan
- List of members of the 7th National Assembly of Pakistan
- List of members of the 8th National Assembly of Pakistan
- List of members of the 9th National Assembly of Pakistan
- List of members of the 10th National Assembly of Pakistan
- List of members of the 11th National Assembly of Pakistan
- List of members of the 12th National Assembly of Pakistan
- List of members of the 13th National Assembly of Pakistan
- List of members of the 14th National Assembly of Pakistan
- List of members of the 15th National Assembly of Pakistan
