= Alizeh =

Alizeh is a given name of Persian and Urdu origins meaning “wind”, "trade-wind" or "gentle-breeze". It could also be associated with"beauty of light", "radiant", or "joy". It is a common name in Muslim majority parts of South Asia. Notable people with the name include:

- Alizeh Agnihotri, Indian actress
- Alizeh Shah, Pakistani actress
- Alizeh Iqbal Haider, Pakistani politician
- Alizeh Imtiaz, Pakistani filmmaker

== See also ==
- Aliza
