= Rao Hashim Khan =

Rao M.Hashim Khan (فخرے پاکپتن) راؤ محمد ہاشم خاں
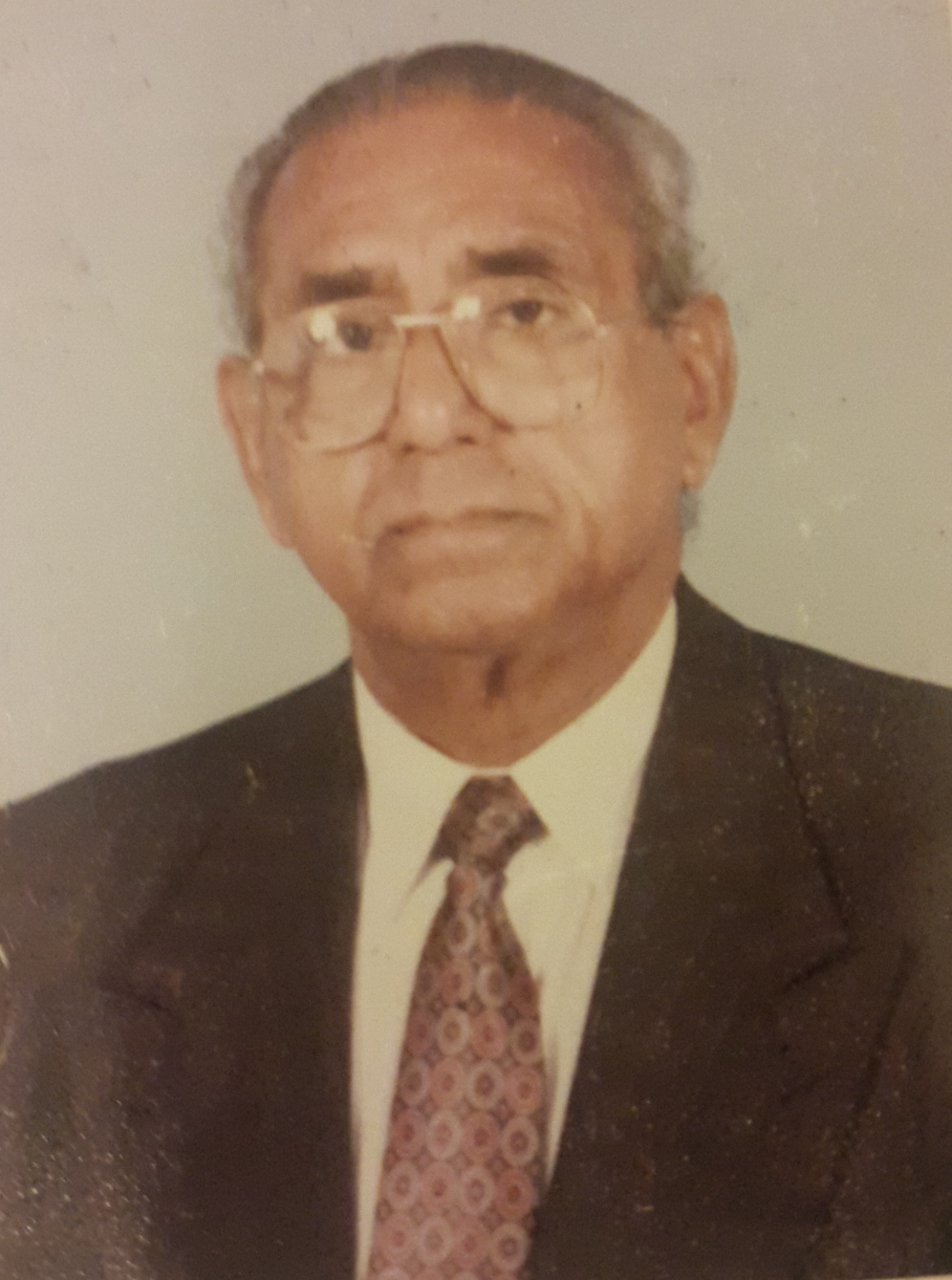
- Rao M.Hashim Khan in 2002

Chairman of the 10th PAC, Pakistan
- In office 28 August 1995 – 5 November 1996
- President: Farooq Leghari
- Prime Minister: Benazir Bhutto
- Preceded by: Mr.Hamza – NA-73
- Succeeded by: Mr.Hamza – NA-73
- Constituency: NA-128 (Pakpattan)

Member of Parliament
- In office 15 October 1993 – 5 November 1996
- President: Wasim Sajjad(Acting); Farooq Leghari
- Prime Minister: Moeenuddin Ahmad Qureshi(Acting); Benazir Bhutto
- Preceded by: Mian Mehmood Ahmed Khan of IJI
- Succeeded by: Mian Mehmood Ahmed Khan of Nawaz League
- Constituency: NA-128 (Pakpattan).
- In office 26 March 1977 – 5 July 1977
- President: Fazal Ilahi Chaudhry
- Prime Minister: Quaid-e-Awam ZA Bhutto
- Succeeded by: Position abolished
- Constituency: NA-138 Pakpattan(Sahiwal-VII)
- In office 14 April 1972 – 7 March 1977
- President: Quaid-e-Awam ZA Bhutto; Fazal Ilahi Chaudhry
- Prime Minister: Quaid-e-Awam ZA Bhutto
- Preceded by: Position established
- Constituency: NW-98 Pakpattan(Sahiwal-VI)

Personal details
- Born: 15 March 1923 Balyali Bhiwani, East Punjab, British India (Present-day Haryana, India)
- Died: 14 July 2012 (aged 89) Lahore, Pakistan
- Party: Pakistan Peoples Party
- Spouse: Shabbir-un-Nisa
- Children: Rao Naseem Hashim Former District Nazim Pakpattan, Rao Amin Hashim Former IG Balocistan, Rao Naeem Hashim Justice.R, Dr.Rao Shamim Hashim, Rao Fahim Hashim Former Deputy Commissioner Jhang (Passed Away), Rao Jamil Hashim.
- Relatives: Rao Family
- Education: Aligarh Muslim University; Govt. College, Lahore.
- Occupation: Lawyer, Politician.

Rao Muhammad Hashim Khan (Urdu: راؤمُحمّد ہاشِم خان) was one of the oldest and most senior members of the Pakistan People's Party. He hails from District Pakpattan which is considered a stronghold of the Rao Family, who settled in this area after the independence of Pakistan in 1947.

== Life ==
=== Early life ===
He was born to Rao Chaudhri Muhammad Ali who was a government official and his wife Hameeda Begum in 1923. In his early life he attended Government College Lahore for his Secondary Education. While there he took an active part in extracurricular and sports activities in college particularly in boxing and went on to take part in the National Level Inter Collegiate Boxing Championship in India. In addition while there he befriended Nobel Laureate Dr. Abdus Salam as well as legendary Bollywood actor Dev Anand. Being comparatively secular he befriended numerous Hindu and Sikh class fellows while still being an integral part of the Muslim student varsity at the college. Later on he enrolled in the Aligarh Muslim University and gained his degree in Law. After becoming a lawyer he moved back to his hometown of Hisar and established a thriving practice there mostly in Criminal Law.

=== Career ===
Thus having established a name for himself as a successful lawyer in the city and being one of the most prominent members of his tribe in the area, he was invited by Zulfiqar Ali Bhutto to contest on the ticket of the newly formed Pakistan People's Party in the 1970 elections.

He was an elected member of Pakistan National Assembly thrice since 1970. He took part in the 1970 and 1977 elections and was victorious. In 1988 he was unable to secure his seat in the National Assembly, but was nominated Chairman of the Land Commission. In 1993 he emerged victorious again and was elected Chairman of 10th PAC, Pakistan on 28 August 1995.

=== Later life, retirement, and death ===
He lost in the 1997 elections. After the 2002 elections he retired from active politics and was succeeded by his sons Rao Mohammad Naseem Hashim and Rao Mohammad Jamil Hashim. He was survived by six sons and one daughter. He died on Saturday July 14, 2012 and was buried in his (Chak Bedi) native village in Pakpattan.
