= Sardar Kamal =

Sardar Kamal (Urdu: سردار کمال) is a male Muslim given name. Notable people with the name include:

- Sardar Kamal Khan (born 1972), Pakistani politician
- Sardar Kamal Khan Bangulzai (born 1972), Pakistani politician
- Sardar Kamal (Pakistani comedian), was a Pakistani comedian died on July 30, 2024 at the age of 52.
