= 14th National Assembly =

14th National Assembly may refer to:

- 14th National Assembly of France
- 14th National Assembly of Pakistan
- 14th National Assembly of South Korea
- 14th National Assembly of Vietnam
