= Chaudhary Ahsaanullah Virk =

Pakistani politician

- چوہدری احسانُ ﷲ وِرک

Member of the National Assembly of Pakistan
- Incumbent
- Assumed office 29 February 2024
- Constituency: NA-79 Gujranwala-III

Personal details
- Party: PTI (2018-present)

Chaudhary Ahsaanullah Virk (Urdu: چوہدری احسانُ ﷲ وِرک) is a Pakistani politician who has been a member of the National Assembly of Pakistan since February 2024.

== Political career ==
Virk won the 2024 Pakistani general election from NA-79 Gujranwala-III as an Independent candidate supported by the Pakistan Tehreek-e-Insaf (PTI). He received 103,708 votes while runner up Chaudhary Zulfiqar Bhindar of Pakistan Muslim League (N) (PML (N)) received 100,793 votes.
