= NA-272 =

NA-272 may refer to:

- NA-272 (Lasbela-cum-Gwadar), a constituency of the National Assembly of Pakistan
- NA-272 (Kech-cum-Gwadar), a former constituency of the National Assembly of Pakistan
