= NA-79 Gujranwala-III =

Constituency of the National Assembly of Pakistan

- Constituency for the National Assembly of Pakistan
- Region: Gujranwala City Tehsil (partly) including Eminabad town, Gujranwala Saddar Tehsil (partly) and Kamoke Tehsil (partly) inclujding Kamoke city of Gujranwala District
- Electorate: 599,139

Current constituency
- Party: Pakistan Tehreek-e-Insaf
- Member: Chaudhary Ahsaanullah Virk
- Created from: NA-99 Gujranwala-V; NA-98 Gujranwala-IV

NA-79 Gujranwala-III (این اے-79، گوجرانوالہ-3) is a constituency for the National Assembly of Pakistan.

== Members of Parliament ==
=== 2018–2023: NA-83 Gujranwala-V ===
Election	Member	Party
2018	Chaudhary Zulfiqar Bhindar	PML(N)

=== 2024–present: NA-79 Gujranwala-III ===
Election	Member	Party
2024	Chaudhary Zulfiqar Bhindar	PML(N)

== Election 2002 ==
General elections were held on 10 October 2002. Rana Umar Nazir Khan of PML-Q won by 62,209 votes.

General election 2002: NA-99 Gujranwala-V
Party	Candidate	Votes	%	±%
PML(Q)	Rana Umar Nazir Khan	62,209	47.48	
PPP	Ch. Muhammad Abdullah Virk	46,025	35.13	
MMA	Muhammad Ashraf Jilali	14,474	11.05	
PML(N)	Aamar Sohail Mughal	8,310	6.34	
Turnout		134,760	47.42	
Total valid votes		131,018	97.22	
Rejected ballots		3,742	2.78	
Majority		16,184	12.35	
Registered electors		284,193		

== Election 2008 ==
General elections were held on 18 February 2008. Rana Nazeer Ahmed Khan of PML-N won by 60,219 votes.

General election 2008: NA-99 Gujranwala-V
Party	Candidate	Votes	%	±%
PML(N)	Rana Nazeer Ahmed Khan	60,219	41.30	
PPP	Ch. Muhammad Abdullah Virk	44,705	30.66	
PML(Q)	Ch. Shamshad Ahmad Khan	39,986	27.42	
Others	Others (three candidates)	914	0.62	
Turnout		149,805	43.80	
Total valid votes		145,824	97.34	
Rejected ballots		3,981	2.66	
Majority		15,514	10.64	
Registered electors		342,054		
PML(N) gain from PML(Q)				

== Election 2013 ==
General elections were held on 11 May 2013. Rana Umar Nazir Khan of PML-N won by 97,143 votes and became the member of National Assembly.

General election 2013: NA-99 Gujranwala-V
Party	Candidate	Votes	%	±%
PML(N)	Rana Umar Nazir Khan	97,143	54.08	
PPP	Chaudhary Zulfiqar Bhindar	36,897	20.54	
PTI	Sajid Ali	20,212	11.25	
Independent	Asim Abdullah Virk	17,117	9.53	
Others	Others (twelve candidates)	8,245	4.60	
Turnout		185,658	58.38	
Total valid votes		179,614	96.75	
Rejected ballots		6,044	3.25	
Majority		60,246	33.54	
Registered electors		318,029		
PML(N) hold				

== Election 2018 ==
General elections were held on 25 July 2018.

General election 2018: NA-83 Gujranwala-V
Party	Candidate	Votes	%	±%
PML(N)	Chaudhary Zulfiqar Bhindar	139,235	55.83	
PTI	Rana Nazeer Ahmed Khan	75,940	30.45	
Others	Others (eight candidates)	26,203	10.51	
Turnout		249,397	55.07	
Rejected ballots		8,019	3.21	
Majority		63,295	25.38	
Registered electors		452,848		
PML(N) hold		Swing	N/A	

== Election 2024 ==
General elections were held on 8 February 2024. Chaudhary Zulfiqar Bhindar won the election with 95,604 votes.

General election 2024: NA-79 Gujranwala-III
Party	Candidate	Votes	%	±%
PML(N)	Chaudhary Zulfiqar Bhindar	95,604	34.53	▼21.30
PTI	Chaudhary Ahsaanullah Virk (Note: Filed)	92,581	33.44	▲2.99
TLP	Muhammad Habib	24,491	8.85	▲0.69
Independent	Sajid Ali	23,250	8.40	
IPP	Rana Nazeer Ahmed Khan	16,796	6.07	
Others	Others (eight candidates)	24,142	8.71	
Turnout		300,709	50.19	▼4.88
Total valid votes		276,864	92.07	
Rejected ballots		23,845	7.93	
Majority		3,023	1.09	▼24.29
Registered electors		599,139		
PML(N) hold				

== See also ==
- NA-78 Gujranwala-II
- NA-80 Gujranwala-IV
