= Malik Jawad Hussain =

Politician in Pakistan

Member of the National Assembly of Pakistan
- In office 13 August 2018 – 25 January 2023
- Constituency: NA-47 (Tribal Area-VIII)
- In office 2008–2013
- Constituency: NA-39 (Tribal Area-IV)

Personal details
- Party: PPP (2023-present)
- Other political affiliations: PTI (2018-2023); PPP (2013-2018); IND (2002-2013)

Jawad Hussain is a Pakistani politician who has been a member of the National Assembly of Pakistan from August 2018 till January 2023. Previously he was a member of the National Assembly from 2008 to 2013.

== Political career ==
He was elected to the National Assembly of Pakistan from Constituency NA-39 (Tribal Area-IV) as an independent candidate in the 2008 Pakistani general election. He received 21,844 votes and defeated an independent candidate, Gul Karim Khan.

He joined Pakistan Peoples Party (PPP) in 2013.

He ran for the seat of the National Assembly from Constituency NA-39 (Tribal Area-IV) as a candidate of PPP in the 2013 Pakistani general election but was unsuccessful. He received 7,547 votes and lost the seat to Ghazi Ghulab Jamal.

He was re-elected to the National Assembly as a candidate of Pakistan Tehreek-e-Insaf (PTI) from Constituency NA-47 (Tribal Area-VIII) in the 2018 Pakistani general election. He received 11,102 votes and defeated Qasim Gul, a candidate of Jamiat Ulema-e Islam (F).

On 19 May 2023, he left the PTI due to the 2023 Pakistani protests. He later re-joined the Pakistan People's Party (PPP) on 2 June 2023.
