= Zubaida Jalal =

Pakistani politician

- زبيدہ جلال
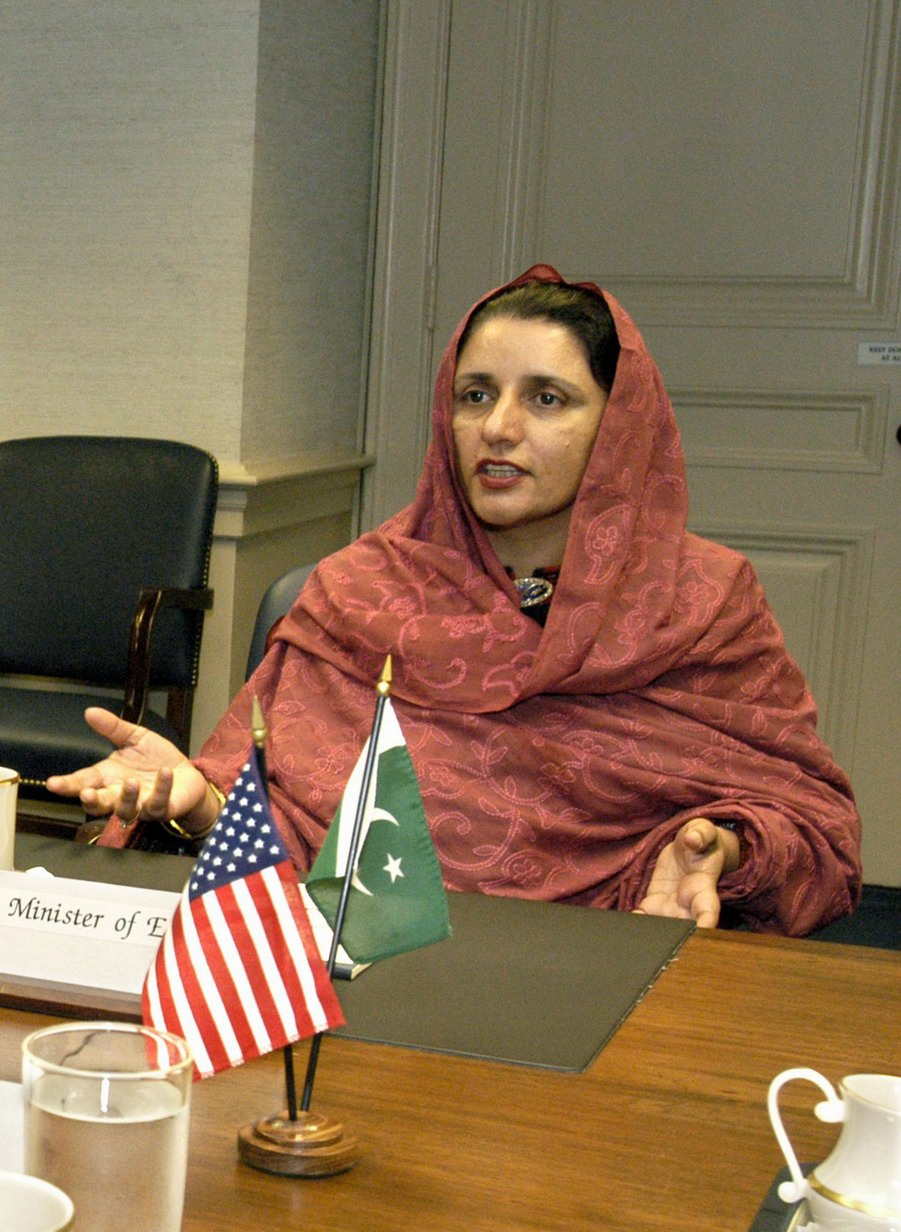

Minister for Defence Production
- In office 20 August 2018 – 10 April 2022
- President: Mamnoon Hussain; Arif Alvi
- Prime Minister: Imran Khan
- Preceded by: Naeem Khalid Lodhi (caretaker)

Minister for Education
- In office 24 November 2002 – 15 November 2007
- President: Pervez Musharraf
- Prime Minister: Zafarullah Khan Jamali
- Preceded by: Tehmina Daultana
- Succeeded by: Ahsan Iqbal

Personal details
- Born: Zubaida Jalal Khan; 31 August 1959 (age 67) Kuwait
- Citizenship: Pakistani
- Party: BAP (2018-present)
- Other political affiliations: PMLN (1988-2002; 2013-2018); IND (2008-2013); PML (Q) (2002-2008)
- Education: University of Balochistan
- Occupation: Teacher, social worker

Zubaida Jalal Khan (Urdu: زبيدہ جلال خان; born 31 August 1959) is a Pakistani politician, a teacher, libertarian and social activist, who served as the Defence Production Minister from August 2018 until April 2022.

After successfully contesting in general elections held in 2002 on a PML(Q) platform, she came in national prominence and public fame as a leading woman minister in the cabinet of Prime Minister Shaukat Aziz. From 2002 to 2007, she was the minister of education (MoEd) and unsuccessfully contested for general elections held in 2008 on a PML(Q) platform.

After a five-year brief break from the national politics, she joined the Pakistan Muslim League (N) but stepped down in favour of Kiran Haider, who successfully retained her seat in 2013 general elections, although she retains herself as a woman leader of the Pakistan Muslim League (N).

== Social and political activism ==
=== Teachings and services to education ===
After returning from Kuwait, she helped established a school for girls in her village with the support of her father because in that time in such traditional conservative Baloch society did not allowed women to go to schools. While teaching at school, she also taught English literature at the Balochistan University. In 1993, her services were recognised by the Government of Pakistan and honoured her with Pride of Performance Award for Education by the President of Pakistan. She has authored many publications include Papers on Baloch Embroidery and Poverty alleviation.

Her political activism started after joining the centre-right Pakistan Muslim League (PML) led by Prime minister Nawaz Sharif in 1988; but defected to dissident group in 2000. She successfully contested in general elections held in 2002, securing 44,177 voted from her NA–27 constituency. In 2002, she was appointed as the minister of Minister of Education (MoEd) and took oath from President Pervez Musharraf as part of the Prime Minister Zafarullah Jamali's cabinet. She would later given extension and would continue served in the cabinet of Prime Minister Shaukat Aziz.

=== Education ministry ===
In 2004, Zubaida Jalal announced that "all religious seminaries will now be involved in all mainstream education programmes." Approved by President Pervez Musharraf, the programme was in making the madrassa (seminaries) integrated with modern education reforms. Jalal personally had approved the ₨. 225–500 million from the government for 2003–04; all funding were jointly released by the US AID. Reforms were set to be carried out to change the school curriculum and many revival updates, deregulation of the textbooks were part of the program which was oversaw by the Zubaida Jalal.

Despite initiation and modernisation, the programme did not move an inch, according to the media reports. The education ministry did not made no movement on seminary reforms and registration, with no related meetings scheduled and new no policy guidelines issued to government departments. In a media report published by Daily Times, the Education ministry failed in making the madrassa (seminaries) reforms successful in 2004. They asked the government to reopen madrassa registration for more people to benefit from the Madrassa Reforms Package. Approximately, ₨. 6 billion were set-aside for the reforms' first three years and the government gave an additional ₨. 225 million to four provinces, but the provinces failed to use the funds.

According to the officials worked under Zubaida Jalal's administration confirmed that no new policy on madrassa reforms had been prepared and the old policy was still intact. In 2009, educationist, Saleem Ali wrote a thesis in his book, "Islam and Education: Conflict and Conformity in Pakistan's Madrassas", that " indeed all private and public schools, are still subject to government approval, whereas the madrassa programmes at present have no government oversight." The government's inability to impose the program and lack of interest in topics further diminished. The powerful clerics threatened the government upon which the federal education minister Zubaida Jalal immediately clarified that no chapter or verses relating to jihad or Holy War or shahadat (martyrdom) had been deleted from textbook and that the particular verse referring to jihad had only been shifted from the biology textbook for intermediate students.

According to the Education ministry, the major reason for this failure was the view of the madrassas that the project was part of an American agenda. Others maintained that there were "high level interests" which had hampered the process. Furthermore, majority of the funds were lost during a tug of war between the Interior ministry, Religious ministry and Education ministry which Zubaida Jalal led. This squabble was eventually resolved by a personal intervention of President Pervez Musharraf in 2007.

=== 2008 general election campaign ===
In 2008, Jalal decided not to obtain the PML(Q) ticket, and instead contested in the 2008 general elections as an independent candidate, from the NA–272 constituency. She lost the 2008 general election while securing only 33,564 votes and losing to Yaqoob Bizanjo of Balochistan National Party (Awami).

=== 2013 general election ===
In 2013, Zubaida Jalal endorsed PML(N) candidate Nawaz Sharif's bid for premiership. In a meeting with Nawaz Sharif, Jalal announced to join the PML-N, reposing full confidence in the leadership of Nawaz Sharif.

=== 2018 general election ===
Zubaida Jalal Joined BAP and successfully contested the elections. Following the PTI government coalition with BAP, she was nominated as the BAP representative in the Federal Cabinet. She was inducted as Minister for Defence Production on 20 August 2018. After the success of the No-confidence motion against Imran Khan Cabinet was dissolved and she resigned alongside Imran Khan from the ministry.

== Personal life ==
=== Political controversies ===
Soon after the general elections in 2008, the FIA launched an investigation on Zubaida Jalal over the financial scam. The FIA investigations were launched under the directives of Prime Minister Yousaf Raza Gillani who felt that "the role of the minister of that time Zubaida Jalal needs to be investigated without which the objectives of the whole exercise will remain unmet." Zubaida Jalal has strongly denied the allegations of corruption against her. In 2009, the FIA investigations were wrapped.

In 2010 publications edited by Pakistan Institute of Legislative Development and Transparency (PILDT), Zubaida Jalal is a second richest politician from Balochistan, having declared the total assets worth ₨. 57.87 million.

=== Political philosophy ===
Zubaida Jalal was touted as General Pervez Musharraf's most enlightened face and was one of the notable minister under Musharraf's regime. In 2008, she publicly endorsed the support for President Pervez Musharraf during the times of impeachment movement was in effect against the former president. In a television interview, Zubaida Jalal said that as a bold and brave leader, Pervez Musharraf will live in Pakistan and for Pakistan. While talking to APP this afternoon after the Pervez Musharraf announced his resignation, Begum Jalal said that to the extent she knows Musharraf, he is not likely to leave the field empty but will continue his struggle for an enlightened, peaceful and progressive Pakistan.

She has strongly advocated for the support of liberal philosophy, "Enlightened Moderation" and noted that "Extremism is a barrier to development and an enlightened moderation is the key to globalization."
