= Sardar Mansab Ali Dogar =

Pakistani politician

- سردار منصب علی ڈوگر

Member of the National Assembly of Pakistan
- In office 2008 – 31 May 2018
- Constituency: NA-164 (Pakpattan-I)

Personal details
- Born: March 30, 1959 (age 67)
- Party: TLP (2025-present)
- Other political affiliations: PMLN (2023-2025); PMLN (2002-2018); PTI (2023-2023)

Sardar Mansab Ali Dogar (Urdu: سردار منصب علی ڈوگر; born 30 March 1959) is a Pakistani politician who had been a member of the National Assembly of Pakistan, from 2008 to May 2018.

== Early life ==
He was born on 30 March 1959.

== Political career ==
He ran for the seat of the Provincial Assembly of the Punjab as a candidate of Pakistan Muslim League (N) (PML(N)) from Constituency PP-229 (Pakpattan-III) in the 2002 Pakistani general election but was unsuccessful. He received 22,167 votes and lost the seat to Mumtaz Hussain, a candidate of Pakistan Muslim League (Q) (PML(Q)).

He was elected to the National Assembly of Pakistan as a candidate of PML(N) from Constituency NA-164 (Pakpattan-I) in the 2008 Pakistani general election. He received 35,597 votes and defeated Muhammad Shah Khagga (34196), a candidate of PML(Q). In the same election, he was also elected to the Provincial Assembly of the Punjab as a candidate of PML(N) from Constituency PP-229 (Pakpattan-III). He received 22,092 voted and defeated Mian Muhammad Amjad Joiya, a candidate of PML(Q). He vacated the Provincial Assembly seat and retained the National Assembly seat.

He was re-elected to the National Assembly as a candidate of PML(N) from Constituency NA-164 (Pakpattan-I) in the 2013 Pakistani general election. He received 67,984 votes and defeated Muhammad Shah Khagga (65568), a candidate of PML(Q).

In October 2017, he was made Federal Parliamentary Secretary for Defence.

He ran for the National Assembly from NA-145 Pakpattan-I in the 2018 Pakistani general election as an independent candidate. He received 32,491 votes and was defeated by Ahmad Raza Maneka, a candidate of the PML(N).

On 20 March 2023, Dogar joined the Pakistan Tehreek-e-Insaf (PTI) after a meeting with Imran Khan, the party chairman and former Prime Minister. On 27 May 2023, he left the PTI due to the 2023 Pakistani protests.

He was elected member of Punjab Assembly as PML-N candidate from PP-197 Pakpattan-V in the 2024 General Elections and defeated Tariq Qayyum Shah Khagga, an independent candidate supported by PTI.
