= Panezai =

Panezai is a surname. Notable people with the surname include:

- Noor Jehan Panezai (died 2014), Pakistani politician, Deputy Chairman of the Senate of Pakistan 1991–1994
- Naseema Hafeez Panezai, Pakistani politician, member of the National Assembly of Pakistan 2013–2018
