= Aisha Syed =

Aisha Syed may refer to:

- Aisha Syed Castro, Dominican violinist
- Aisha Syed (politician), Pakistani politician
