= Kiran Imran Dar =

Pakistani politician

Member of the National Assembly of Pakistan
- In office 13 August 2018 – 10 August 2023
- Constituency: Reserved seat for women
- In office 15 April 2015 – 31 May 2018
- Constituency: Reserved seat for women

Personal details
- Party: PMLN (2008-present)
- Relations: Nasir Hussain Dar (brother)

Kiran Imran Dar (Urdu: کرن عمران ڈار) is a Pakistani politician who had been a member of the National Assembly of Pakistan from August 2018 till August 2023. Previously she was a member of the National Assembly from April 2015 to May 2018 and a member of the Provincial Assembly of the Punjab from 2008 to 2015.

She is the younger sister of Nasir Hussain Dar, a member of the Azad Kashmir Legislative Assembly.

== Political career ==
She was elected to the Provincial Assembly of the Punjab as a candidate of Pakistan Muslim League (N) (PML-N) on a reserved seats for women in the 2008 Pakistani general election.

She was re-elected to the Provincial Assembly of the Punjab as a candidate of PML-N on a reserved seats for women in the 2013 Pakistani general election.

She was elected to the National Assembly of Pakistan as a candidate of PML-N on a reserved seats for women from Punjab in April 2015 following the resignation of Ayesha Raza Farooq.

She was re-elected to the National Assembly as a candidate of PML-N on a seat reserved for women from Punjab in the 2018 Pakistani general election.
