= Syed Ghazi Ghazan Jamal Orakzai =

Pakistani politician

Member of the Provincial Assembly of Khyber Pakhtunkhwa
- In office 27 August 2019 – 18 January 2023
- Constituency: PK-110 (Orakzai)

Personal details
- Party: PTI-P (2025-present)
- Other political affiliations: PTI (2019-2023)
- Parent: Ghazi Ghulab Jamal (father)

Syed Ghazi Ghazan Jamal Orakzai is a Pakistani politician who was a member of the Provincial Assembly of Khyber Pakhtunkhwa from August 2019 to January 2023.

== Political career ==
He contested the 2019 Khyber Pakhtunkhwa provincial election on 20 July 2019 from constituency PK-110 (Orakzai) as an independent candidate. He won the election by the majority of 3,749 votes over the runner up, Shoaib Hassan of Pakistan Tehreek-e-Insaf. He garnered 18,448 votes while Hassan received 14,699 votes. Ghazan was elected as the first MPA from district Orakzai. After being elected he joined the Pakistan Tehreek-e-Insaf.

He was later made focal person to Chief Minister Khyber Pakhtunkhwa for newly merged districts (NMDs). He was also made part of the KP Cabinet being appointed as the Special Assistant to Chief Minister KP for Excise, Taxation and Narcotics Control.
