= Nelson Azeem =

Pakistani politician

Member of the National Assembly of Pakistan
- In office 2008–2013
- Constituency: Reserved seat for minorities
- Incumbent
- Assumed office 2024

Personal details
- Party: PMLN (2008-present)
- Spouse: Phyllis Azeem

Nelson Azeem is a Pakistani politician who is a member of the National Assembly of Pakistan from 2008 till 2013. Re-elected in February 2024 as member of the 16th National Assembly. Currently serving as Federal Parliamentary Secretary of Ministry of National Health Services, Regulations & Coordination Government of Pakistan.

== Political career ==
He was elected to the National Assembly of Pakistan on a seat reserved for minorities as a candidate of Pakistan Muslim League (N) in the 2008 Pakistani general election and 2024 Pakistan general election

== Family ==
He is married Phyllis Azeem.
