= LA-34 Jammu and Others-I =

Electoral district in Azad Jammu and Kashmir

- Constituency for the Azad Kashmir Legislative Assembly
- District: Sindh, Balochistan, and Punjab (excluding Gujranwala Division and Rawalpindi Division)
- Electorate: 18,542

Current constituency
- Party: Pakistan Muslim League (N)
- Member: Nasir Hussain Dar
- Created from: LA-30 Jammu and Others-I

LA-34 Jammu and Others-I is a constituency of the Azad Kashmir Legislative Assembly which is currently represented by Nasir Hussain Dar of Pakistan Muslim League (N) (PML(N)). It covers the area of Sindh, Balochistan, and Punjab (excluding Gujranwala Division and Rawalpindi Division). Only refugees from Jammu and Ladakh settled in Pakistan are eligible to vote in this constituency.

== Election 2016 ==
General elections were held on 21 July 2016.

General election 2016: LA-30 Jammu and Others-I
Party	Candidate	Votes	%	±%
PML(N)	Nasir Hussain Dar	5,668		
PTI	Maqsood Uz Zaman Khan	1,816		
PPP	Chaudhary Mir Haidar	1,068		
Independent	Zafar Iqbal	672		
MQM-P	Muhammad Mansha Khan	494		
Independent	Saeed Ahmad	86		
Independent	Syed Asad Ali Naqvi	14		
Independent	Sardar Abdur Rasheed Daar	9		
Independent	Ejaz Ahmad Kiyani	8		
Independent	Zulfiqar Ali	6		
Independent	Nadeem Ahmed	6		
Independent	Muhammad Nadeem	5		
Independent	Muhammad Aamir Jaral	3		
Turnout		9,875		

== Election 2021 ==
General elections were held on 25 July 2021.

General election 2021: LA-34 Jammu and Others-I
Party	Candidate	Votes	%	±%
PTI	Riaz Ahmed Gujjar	4,320	41.41	
PML(N)	Nasir Hussain Dar	3,545	33.98	
PPP	Zahid Iqbal	1,489	14.27	
Others	Others (eleven candidates)	1,079	10.34	
Turnout		10,433	56.54	
Majority		775	7.43	
Registered electors		18,542		
PTI gain from PML(N)				

== Election 2026 ==
General elections were held on 2 August 2026. Nasir Hussain Dar won the election with 5,682 votes.

General election 2026: LA-34 Jammu and Others-I
Party	Candidate	Votes	%	±%
PML(N)	Nasir Hussain Dar	5,682	53.44	▲19.46
Independent	Riaz Ahmed Gujjar	2,124	19.98	
PPP	Abdul Qadeer Chauhan	1,177	11.07	▼3.20
AJKMC	Muhammad Saud Mukhtar	713	6.71	
IPP	Bilal Mukhtar Butt	489	4.60	
Others	Others (twelve candidates)	447	4.20	
Turnout		10,826	56.95	▲0.41
Total valid votes		10,632	98.23	
Rejected ballots		194	1.77	
Majority		3,558	33.46	
Registered electors		19,008		
PML(N) gain from PTI				
