= Yaqoob Bizanjo =

Pakistani politician

Yaqoob Bizenjo

Member of the National Assembly of Pakistan
- In office 2008–2013
- Constituency: NA-272 (Kech-cum-Gwadar)

Yaqoob Bizenjo is a Pakistani politician who was a member of the National Assembly of Pakistan from 2008 to 2013.

== Political career ==
He was elected to the National Assembly of Pakistan from Constituency NA-272 (Kech-cum-Gwadar) as a candidate of Balochistan National Party Awami in the 2008 Pakistani general election. He received 61,655 votes and defeated an independent candidate, Zubaida Jalal Khan.
