= Salman Haneef =

Pakistani politician

- سلمان حنیف

Member of the National Assembly of Pakistan
- In office 1 June 2013 – 31 May 2018
- Constituency: NA-138 (Kasur-I)

Personal details
- Born: 1 February 1981 (age 45)
- Party: Pakistan Muslim League (N)

Salman Haneef Chaudhry (Urdu: سلمان حنیف چوہدری; born 1 February 1981) is a Pakistani politician who had been a member of the National Assembly of Pakistan, from June 2013 to May 2018.

== Early life ==
He was born on 1 February 1981.

== Political career ==
He was elected to the National Assembly of Pakistan as a candidate of Pakistan Muslim League (N) from Constituency NA-138 (Kasur-I) in the 2013 Pakistani general election. He received 75,694 votes and defeated an independent candidate, Sardar Tufail Ahmad Khan.

== Controversies ==
In December 2014, it was reported that Chaudhry manhandled and beaten the headmaster of a local school in Kasur. It was reported that Chaudhry had demanded a passage from the school ground for the land of his relative and did not want a portion of the wall to be raised. Some students pelted Haneef with bricks and scared him away by brandishing sticks.
