= Shazia Mubashar =

Pakistani politician

- شازیہ مبشر

Member of the National Assembly of Pakistan
- In office 16 September 2013 – 31 May 2018
- Constituency: NA-129 (Lahore)

Personal details
- Party: Pakistan Muslim League (N)

Shazia Mubashar (Urdu: شازیہ مبشر) is a Pakistani politician who had been a member of the National Assembly of Pakistan from September 2013 to May 2018.

== Political career ==
She was elected to the National Assembly of Pakistan as a candidate of Pakistan Muslim League (N) from Constituency NA-129 (Lahore-XII) in by-election held in August 2013. She received 44,894 votes and defeated Muhammad Mansha Sindhu, a candidate of Pakistan Tehreek-e-Insaf (PTI). The seat became vacant after Shahbaz Sharif who won it in the 2013 Pakistani general election vacated it in order to retain the seat won in his home Provincial Assembly constituency.
