= Shazia Sobia =

Pakistani politician

Member of the National Assembly of Pakistan
- In office 13 August 2018 – 10 August 2023
- Constituency: Reserved seat for women
- In office 6 November 2015 – 31 May 2018
- Constituency: Reserved seat for women

Personal details
- Party: PPP (2015-present)

Shazia Sobia (Urdu: شازیہ ثوبیہ) is a Pakistani politician who had been a member of the National Assembly of Pakistan from August 2018 till August 2023. Previously she was member of the National Assembly from November 2015 to May 2018.

== Political career ==
She was elected to the National Assembly of Pakistan as a candidate of Pakistan Peoples Party (PPP) on a reserved seat for women from Sindh in 2015 following the resignation of Alizeh Iqbal Haider.

She was re-elected to the National Assembly as a candidate of PPP on a seat reserved for women from Sindh in the 2018 Pakistani general election.
