= Nasir Hussain Dar =

Pakistani politician

- ناصر حسین ڈار

Member of the Azad Kashmir Legislative Assembly
- Incumbent
- Assumed office 24 August 2026
- Preceded by: Riaz Gujjar
- Constituency: LA-34 Jammu and Others-I
- In office 30 July 2016 – 3 August 2021
- Preceded by: Muhammad Tahir Khokhar
- Succeeded by: Riaz Gujjar
- Constituency: LA-30 Jammu and Others-I

Personal details
- Party: Pakistan Muslim League (N)
- Relations: Kiran Imran Dar (sister)

Nasir Hussain Dar (Urdu: ناصر حسین ڈار) is a Pakistani politician who has been a member of the Azad Kashmir Legislative Assembly since August 2026. He previously served as a member of the Assembly from July 2016 to August 2021.

He is the elder brother of Kiran Imran Dar, a member of the National Assembly of Pakistan.

== Political career ==
Dar was elected to the Azad Kashmir Legislative Assembly from LA-30 Jammu and Others-I as a candidate of Pakistan Muslim League (N) (PML(N)). He received 5,688 votes and defeated Maqsood-uz-Zaman Khan, a candidate of Pakistan Tehreek-e-Insaf (PTI).

On 1 December 2016, he was sworn into the cabinet of Prime Minister Raja Farooq Haider Khan and was made the Minister for Rehabilitation and Transport. After a cabinet reshuffle on 7 November 2018, he was made the Minister for Transport, Wildlife and Fisheries.

He contested the 2021 Azad Kashmiri general election from LA-34 Jammu and Others-I as a candidate of PML(N), but was unsuccessful. He received 3,545 votes and was defeated by Riaz Gujjar, a candidate of PTI.

He was re-elected to the Assembly from LA-34 Jammu and Others-I as a candidate of PML(N) in the 2026 Azad Kashmiri general election. He received 5,682 votes, while the runner-up, Riaz Gujjar, an independent candidate, received 2,124 votes.
