= Ghulam Muhammad Maneka =

Pakistani politician

Member of the National Assembly of Pakistan

Personal details
- Party: Pakistan Peoples Party
- Children: Ahmad Raza Maneka; Farooq Ahmad Maneka; Khawar Ahmad Maneka

Ghulam Muhammad Maneka (1934-2002) was a Pakistani politician who was Member of National Assembly of Pakistan and former federal minister during Benazir Bhutto cabinet.

== Family ==
His son Ahmad Raza Maneka was member of the National Assembly of Pakistan from 2018-2023.
