= Muhammad Salman Mohsin Gillani =

Pakistani politician

Member of the National Assembly of Pakistan
- In office 2008–2013
- Constituency: NA-165 (Pakpattan-II)

Personal details
- Born: 4 July 1977 (age 49)

Muhammad Salman Mohsin Gillani (Urdu: محمد سلمان محسن گیلانی; born 4 July 1977) is a Pakistani politician who had been a member of the National Assembly of Pakistan from 2008 to 2013.

== Early life ==
He was born on 4 July 1977.

== Political career ==
He was elected to the National Assembly of Pakistan from Constituency NA-165 (Pakpattan-II) as a candidate of Pakistan Muslim League (N) (PML-N) in the 2008 Pakistani general election. He received 67,400 votes and defeated Mian Ahmad Raza Khan Maneka, a candidate of Pakistan Muslim League (Q) (PML-Q).
