= Rana Umar Nazir Khan =

Pakistani politician (born 1976)

- رانا عمر نذیرخان

Member of the National Assembly of Pakistan
- In office 1 June 2013 – 31 May 2018
- Constituency: NA-99 (Gujranwala-V)

Personal details
- Born: 9 April 1976 (age 50) Gujranwala, Punjab, Pakistan
- Party: TLP (2025–present)
- Other political affiliations: IPP (2023–2025); PTI (2018–2023); PMLN (2008–2018); PML(Q) (2002–2008)
- Relations: Rana Nazeer Ahmed Khan (father)

Rana Umar Nazir Khan (Urdu: رانا عمر نذیر خان; born 9 April 1976) is a Pakistani politician who had been a member of the National Assembly of Pakistan between 2013 and May 2018.

== Early life ==
He was born on 9 April 1976 to Rana Nazeer Ahmed Khan.

== Political career ==
He was re-elected to the National Assembly as a candidate of Pakistan Muslim League (Q) (PML-Q) from NA-99 Gujranwala-V in the 2002 Pakistani general election. He received 62,209 votes and defeated Chaudhry Muhammad Abdullah Virk, a candidate of Pakistan People's Party (PPP).

In 2007, he quit PML-Q to join PML-N.

He ran for the seat of the National Assembly as a candidate of Jamhoori Wattan Party from NA-99 Gujranwala-V in the 2008 Pakistani general election but was unsuccessful. He received 690 votes and lost the seat to, his father, Rana Nazeer Ahmed Khan, a candidate of PML-N.

He was re-elected to the National Assembly as a candidate of PML-N from NA-99 Gujranwala-V in the 2013 Pakistani general election. He received 97,143 voted and defeated Chaudhary Zulfiqar Bhindar, a candidate of PPP.

In May 2018, he quit PML-N and joined Pakistan Tehreek-e-Insaf.

He ran for the seat of the Provincial Assembly of Punjab as a candidate of Istehkam-e-Pakistan Party (IPP) from PP-68 Gujranwala-X in the 2024 Punjab provincial election, but was unsuccessful. He received 124 votes and was defeated by Mian Arqam Khan, an independent candidate supported by PTI.
