= Saad Waseem Akhtar Sheikh =

Pakistani politician

- سعد وسیم اختر شیخ

Member of the National Assembly of Pakistan
- Incumbent
- Assumed office 29 February 2024
- Constituency: NA-131 Kasur-I
- In office 13 August 2018 – 10 August 2023
- Constituency: NA-137 (Kasur-I)

Personal details
- Party: PMLN (2018-present)

Saad Waseem Akhtar Sheikh is a Pakistani politician who has been a member of the National Assembly of Pakistan since February 2024, and previously from August 2018 until August 2023.

== Political career ==
Sheikh was elected to the National Assembly of Pakistan from NA-137 (Kasur-I) as a candidate of Pakistan Muslim League (N) (PML(N)) in the 2018 Pakistani general election.

He was re-elected to the National Assembly from NA-131 Kasur-I as a candidate of PML(N) in the 2024 Pakistani general election. He received 110,556 votes and defeated Muhammad Maqsood Sabir Ansari, an candidate supported by PTI
