= Naeema Kishwar Khan =

Pakistani politician

Member of the National Assembly of Pakistan
- In office 1 June 2013 – 31 May 2018
- Constituency: Reserved seat for women

Member of the Provincial Assembly of Khyber Pakhtunkhwa
- In office 2010–2013

Personal details
- Party: Jamiat Ulema-e-Islam (F)

Naeema Kishwar Khan (Urdu: نعیمہ کشور خان) is a Pakistani politician who had been a member of the National Assembly of Pakistan from June 2013 to May 2018.

== Education ==
She has a degree in Islamic law.

== Political career ==
She was elected to the Provincial Assembly of Khyber Pakhtunkhwa as a candidate of Jamiat Ulema-e-Islam (F) on a reserved seat for women in 2010.

She was re-elected to the National Assembly of Pakistan as a candidate of Jamiat Ulema-e-Islam (F) on a reserved seat for women from Khyber Paktunkhwa in the 2013 Pakistani general election.

PILDAT gave her the title of "MNA of the Year" due to her best performance in 14th National Assembly during the third parliamentary year.

On 13 May 2024, the Election Commission of Pakistan (ECP) suspended the membership of Khan as a member of the National Assembly. This action followed a Supreme Court of Pakistan decision to suspend the verdict of the Peshawar High Court, which had denied the allocation of a reserved seat to the PTI-Sunni Ittehad Council bloc.
