= Mian Tariq Mehmood =

Pakistani politician

- میاں طارق محمود

Member of National Assembly
- In office 1 June 2013 – February 2017
- Constituency: NA-98 (Gujranwala-IV)

Personal details
- Born: 3 July 1970 (age 56) Gujranwala, Punjab, Pakistan
- Party: IPP (2023–present)
- Other political affiliations: PTI (2018–2023); PMLN (2018–2013)

Mian Tariq Mehmood (Urdu: میاں طارق محمود; born 3 July 1970) is a Pakistani politician who had been a member of the National Assembly of Pakistan, from June 2013 to February 2017. He also served as Town Nazim during early 2000s from Gujranwala.

== Early life ==
Tariq was born on 3 July 1969 he was. He began his political career in 1996 and wasn’t really successful during the start. Eventually he became famous among the youth and easily won his election during 2013 Pakistan general election. He is brother of (Late) Mian mazhar javed who served as member of provincial assembly of Punjab.

== Political career ==
He was elected to the National Assembly of Pakistan as a candidate of Pakistan Muslim League (N) (PML-N) from Constituency NA-98 (Gujranwala-IV) in the 2013 Pakistani general election. He received 118,832 votes and defeated Imtiaz Safdar Warraich.

On 25 February 2018, Mehmood announced to quit PML-N for some unclear reason. On 27 February, he joined Pakistan Tehreek-e-Insaf (PTI) and resigned from the National Assembly.
