= Syed Essa Noori =

Balochistan politician

Member of the National Assembly of Pakistan
- In office 13 August 2013 – 31 May 2018
- Constituency: NA-272 (Kech-cum-Gwadar)

Personal details
- Born: January 1, 1953 (age 73)
- Party: Balochistan National Party (Mengal)

Syed Essa Noori (Urdu: سید عیسیٰ نوری; born 1 January 1953) is a Pakistani politician who was a member of the National Assembly of Pakistan from August 2013 to May 2018.

== Early life ==
He was born on 1 January 1953.

== Political career ==
He was elected to the National Assembly of Pakistan as a candidate of Balochistan National Party (Mengal) (BNP-M) from Constituency NA-272 (Kech-cum-Gwadar) in by-election held in August 2013. He received 15,835 votes and defeated Muhammad Yasin Baloch, a candidate of National Party.
