= Sabiha Nazir =

Pakistani politician

Member of the National Assembly of Pakistan
- In office 3 June 2013 – 31 May 2018
- Constituency: Reserved seat for women

Personal details
- Party: Pakistan Muslim League (N)

Sabiha Nazir (Urdu: سبیحہ نزیر) is a Pakistani politician who had been a member of the National Assembly of Pakistan from June 2013 to May 2018.

== Education ==
She has done masters in social work.

== Political career ==
She was elected to the National Assembly of Pakistan as a candidate of Pakistan Muslim League (N) on reserved seats for women from Punjab in the 2013 Pakistani general election.
