= Nikhat Shakeel Khan =

Pakistani politician

Member of the National Assembly of Pakistan
- Incumbent
- Assumed office 29 February 2024
- Constituency: Reserved seat for women
- In office 1 June 2013 – 31 May 2018
- Constituency: Reserved seat for women

Personal details
- Born: Karachi, Sindh, Pakistan
- Party: MQM-P (2023-present)
- Other political affiliations: PSP (2016-2023); MQM-L (2013-2016)

Nikhat Shakeel Khan (Urdu: نخت شکیل خان) is a Pakistani politician who had been a member of the National Assembly of Pakistan, from June 2013 to May 2018.

== Political career ==
She was elected to the National Assembly of Pakistan as a candidate of Muttahida Qaumi Movement on reserved seats for women from Sindh in the 2013 Pakistani general election.
