= NA-139 Pakpattan-I =

Constituency of the National Assembly of Pakistan

- Constituency for the National Assembly of Pakistan
- Region: Pakpattan Tehsil (partly) including Pakpattan City of Pakpattan District
- Electorate: 605,369

Current constituency
- Party: Pakistan Muslim League (N)
- Member: Ahmad Raza Maneka
- Created from: NA-164 Pakpattan-I; NA-165 Pakpattan-II

NA-139 Pakpattan-I (این اے-139، پاکپتّن-١) is a constituency for the National Assembly of Pakistan. It mainly comprises Pakpattan Tehsil and includes a majority of the areas from the old NA-164 Pakpattan-I, while basically being an expanded version of the previous NA-165 Pakpattan-II.

== Members of Parliament ==
=== 2018–2023: NA-145 Pakpattan-I ===
Election	Member	Party
2018	Ahmad Raza Maneka	PML (N)

=== 2024–present: NA-139 Pakpattan-I ===
Election	Member	Party
2024	Ahmad Raza Maneka	PML (N)

== Election 2002 ==
General elections were held on 10 October 2002. Mian Ahmed Raza Manika of PML-Q won by 38,522 votes.

General election 2002: NA-165 Pakpattan-II
Party	Candidate	Votes	%	±%
PML(Q)	Ahmad Raza Maneka	38,522	33.23	
PML(N)	Mahmood Ahmed Khan	29,903	25.79	
Independent	Nasim Hashim Khan	26,272	22.66	
PPP	Nasim Mahmood Hotiana	19,715	17.01	
Others	Others (two candidates)	1,523	1.31	
Turnout		120,277	49.17	
Total valid votes		115,935	96.39	
Rejected ballots		4,342	3.61	
Majority		8,619	7.44	
Registered electors		244,602		

== Election 2008 ==
General elections were held on 18 February 2008. Syed Salman Mohsin Gilani of PML-N won by 67,400 votes.

General election 2008: NA-165 Pakpattan-II
Party	Candidate	Votes	%	±%
PML(N)	Muhammad Salman Mohsin Gillani	67,400	56.21	
PML(Q)	Ahmad Raza Maneka	36,603	30.53	
PPP	Mian Nasim Mahmood Hotiana	15,900	13.26	
Turnout		124,585	54.65	
Total valid votes		119,903	96.24	
Rejected ballots		4,682	3.76	
Majority		30,797	25.68	
Registered electors		227,991		
PML(N) gain from PML(Q)				

== Election 2013 ==
General elections were held on 11 May 2013. Syed Athar Hussain Shah of PML-N won by 71,804 votes and became the member of National Assembly.

General election 2013: NA-165 Pakpattan-II
Party	Candidate	Votes	%	±%
PML(N)	Syed Athar Hussain Gilani	71,804	43.45	
PTI	Ahmad Raza Maneka	55,279	33.45	
Independent	Dewan Azmat Said Muhammad Chishti	20,833	12.60	
Independent	Bismillah Shah	11,195	6.78	
Others	Others (seven candidates)	6,131	3.72	
Turnout		171,184	63.25	
Total valid votes		165,242	96.53	
Rejected ballots		5,942	3.47	
Majority		16,525	10.00	
Registered electors		270,634		
PML(N) hold				

== Election 2018 ==
General elections were held on 25 July 2018.

General election 2018: NA-145 Pakpattan-I
Party	Candidate	Votes	%	±%
PML(N)	Ahmad Raza Maneka	118,581	42.34	
PTI	Ahmad Shah Khagga	90,683	32.38	
Independent	Sardar Mansab Ali Dogar	32,491	11.60	
Independent	Naseem Hashim Khan	25,457	9.09	
Others	Others (five candidates)	12,874	4.59	
Turnout		288,798	57.62	
Total valid votes		280,086	96.98	
Rejected ballots		8,712	3.02	
Majority		27,898	9.96	
Registered electors		501,250		
PML(N) hold		Swing	N/A	

== Election 2024 ==
General elections were held on 8 February 2024. Ahmad Raza Maneka won the election with 121,870 votes.

General election 2024: NA-139 Pakpattan-I
Party	Candidate	Votes	%	±%
PML(N)	Ahmad Raza Maneka	121,870	38.54	▼3.80
PTI	Rao Omar Hashim Khan (Note: Filed nomination papers as PTI candidate but ECP allowed him to run as an Independent)	116,746	36.92	▲4.54
TLP	Ghulam Mohyu Din	26,344	8.33	
IPP	Ahmad Shah Khagga	24,327	7.69	
Others	Others (fourteen candidates)	26,959	8.52	
Turnout		327,607	54.12	▼3.50
Total valid votes		316,246	96.53	
Rejected ballots		11,361	3.47	
Majority		5,124	1.62	▼8.34
Registered electors		605,369		
PML(N) hold		Swing	N/A	

== See also ==
- NA-138 Okara-IV
- NA-140 Pakpattan-II
