= Shakila Luqman =

Pakistani politician

Member of the National Assembly of Pakistan
- In office 24 December 2021 – 10 August 2023
- Constituency: Reserved seat for women
- In office 27 June 2013 – 31 May 2018
- Constituency: Reserved seat for women

Personal details
- Party: Pakistan Muslim League (N) (2021–present)

Shakila Luqman (Urdu: شکیلہ لقمان) is a Pakistani politician who had been a member of the National Assembly of Pakistan, from December 2021 to August 2018 and from June 2013 to May 2018.

== Political career ==
She was elected to the National Assembly of Pakistan as a candidate of Pakistan Muslim League (N) on a reserved seat for women from Punjab in the 2013 Pakistani general election.

On 24 December 2021, she was re-elected to the National Assembly as a candidate of the PML(N) on a reserved seat for women from Punjab after Shaista Pervaiz was elected to a general seat in a by-election.
