= Begum Tahira Bukhari =

Pakistani politician

Member of the National Assembly of Pakistan
- In office 13 August 2018 – 10 August 2023
- Constituency: Reserved seat for women
- In office 1 June 2013 – 31 May 2018
- Constituency: Reserved seat for women

Personal details
- Party: PMLN

Begum Tahira Bukhari (Urdu: بیگم طاہرہ بخاری) is a Pakistani politician who had been a member of the National Assembly of Pakistan from August 2018 till August 2023. Previously she was a member of the National Assembly from June 2013 to May 2018.

== Political career ==
She quit Pakistan Muslim League (N) (PML-N) and join Pakistan Muslim League (Q) (PML-Q) during President Pervez Musharraf rule however rejoined PML-N in 2012.

She was elected to the National Assembly of Pakistan as a candidate of PML-N on a reserved seat for women from Khyber Paktunkhwa in the 2013 Pakistani general election.

She was re-elected to the National Assembly as a candidate of PML-N on a reserved seat for women from Khyber Paktunkhwa in the 2018 Pakistani general election.
