= Alizeh Imtiaz =

Pakistani filmmaker

Alizeh Imtiaz (born 10 November 1986, in Karachi, Pakistan) is the a Pakistani filmmaker. She's the first Pakistani to have successfully had a debut short film screened at the London Filmmakers Convention. Her film, Shades of Black was screened at the convention in 2007. The short film won the award for Best Film at the London Filmmakers Convention and was also screened at the London Portobello Film Festival in August 2008. She is one of the youngest directors in Pakistan, and one of the very few to have gained international acclaim.

Imtiaz completed her BA in English and Film and TV Studies from Brunel University, London. She's currently serving as a trustee on the board of DSRA Schools for the underprivileged.

The short film, Shades of Black, was an experimental piece which focused on the journey of a prisoner released from Karachi Central Jail. Her style is very dependent on detail to music and photography. The film, produced by Media Tech Films, for AAG TV, gained much attention after Alizeh appeared on one of Pakistan's most famous comedy talk show called 'Azfar Mani show'.

Her previous experience in direction include a high-profile celebrity based TV show called 'FLASH' for HUM TV channel in Pakistan which she directed before returning to complete her degree. Before her venture into direction, Alizeh Imtiaz had also been active in several theatre productions in Karachi; from acting to direction. Alizeh has attended several workshops to aid her acting talent, from the Royal Academy of Dramatic Art, London and has also been trained in acting by Rahat Kazmi, a famous Pakistani actor, director, teacher and theatric.

In 2010, when Pakistan was deeply affected by the flooding on the Indus River, Alizeh along with a team of people travelled across the Province of Sindh and rehabilitated flood affectees suffering from the devastation. CNN shared Alizeh's photographs of her trips, and in 2011 one of her photographs was among the top five in photojournalism iReport on the CNN website.

== Sources ==
- Portobello Film Festival
