= Shazia Ashfaq Mattu =

Pakistani politician

Shazia Sohail Mir

Member of the National Assembly of Pakistan
- In office 1 June 2013 – 31 May 2018
- Constituency: Reserved seat for women

Personal details
- Born: Shazia Sohail Mir
- Party: Pakistan Muslim League (N)

Shazia Ashfaq Mattu (Urdu: شازیہ اشفاق مٹو) is a Pakistani politician who had been a member of the National Assembly of Pakistan from June 2013 to May 2018.

== Early life and education ==
Mattu was born in Gujranwala. She received her degree of MA in Urdu from University of the Punjab, Lahore.

== Political career ==
She was elected to the Provincial Assembly of the Punjab as a candidate of Pakistan Muslim League (N) from PP-95 (Gujranwala-V) constituency in the 2008 Pakistani general election.

She was indirectly elected to the National Assembly of Pakistan as a candidate of Pakistan Muslim League (N) on reserved seats for women from Punjab in the 2013 Pakistani general election.

On 13 May 2024, the Election Commission of Pakistan (ECP) suspended her membership as a member of the National Assembly. This action followed a Supreme Court of Pakistan decision to suspend the verdict of the Peshawar High Court, which had denied the allocation of a reserved seat to the PTI-Sunni Ittehad Council bloc.
