= Phyllis Azeem =

Pakistani politician

Member of the National Assembly of Pakistan
- In office 3 June 2013 – 31 May 2018
- Constituency: Reserved seat for women

Personal details
- Party: PMLN (2013-present)
- Spouse: Nelson Azeem

Phyllis Azeem is a Pakistani politician who had been a member of the National Assembly of Pakistan, from June 2013 to May 2018.

== Education and personal life ==
She has done masters in political science.

She is married to Nelson Azeem.

== Political career ==
She was elected to the National Assembly of Pakistan as a candidate of Pakistan Muslim League (N) on a reserved seat for women from Punjab in the 2013 Pakistani general election.
