= Rana Nazeer Ahmed Khan =

Pakistani politician

President of PMLN for Punjab, Pakistan
- In office 1999–2001
- Prime Minister: Nawaz Sharif

General Secretary of PMLN for Punjab, Pakistan
- In office 1996–1999
- Prime Minister: Nawaz Sharif

Federal Minister
- In office 2002–2004

Member of the National Assembly of Pakistan
- In office 1985–2018

Personal details
- Born: 10 December 1949 (age 76) Gujranwala, Punjab, Pakistan
- Children: Rana Umar Nazir Khan (son)

Rana Nazeer Ahmed Khan (born 10 December 1949) is a Pakistani politician. He studied law and became a successful lawyer and then came into politics. He joined Pakistan Muslim League in 1985. He was Secretary General of PML-N Punjab province in 1998 as well as President of PML-N for Punjab from 1999-2001.

He is former federal minister (1990–93; 1997–99; 2002–04), and he was Member National Assembly from 1985 until 2018. He also remained Chairman District Council Gujranwala in 1987. He joined PTI in 2018 and left PML-N.
