= Syed Athar Hussain Gilani =

Pakistani politician

- سید اطہر حسین جیلانی

Member of the National Assembly of Pakistan
- In office 1 June 2013 – 31 May 2018
- Constituency: NA-165 (Pakpattan-II)

Personal details
- Born: October 24, 1959 (age 67)
- Party: Pakistan Muslim League (N)

Syed Muhammad Athar Hussain Shah Gillani (Urdu: سید محمد اطہر حسین شاہ گیلانی; born 24 October 1959) is a Pakistani politician who had been a member of the National Assembly of Pakistan, from June 2013 to May 2018.

== Early life ==
He was born on 10 October 1959.

== Political career ==
He was elected to the National Assembly of Pakistan as a candidate of Pakistan Muslim League (N) (PML-N) from Constituency NA-165 (Pakpattan-II) in the 2013 Pakistani general election. He received 71,804 votes and defeated Ahmad Raza Maneka, a candidate of Pakistan Tehreek-e-Insaf (PTI).
