= Ahmad Raza Maneka =

Pakistani politician

Mian Ahmad Raza Maneka

Member of the National Assembly of Pakistan
- Incumbent
- Assumed office 29 February 2024
- Constituency: NA-139 Pakpattan-I
- In office 13 August 2018 – 10 August 2023
- Constituency: NA-145 (Pakpattan-I)
- In office 2002–2007

Personal details
- Party: PMLN (2018-present); PTI (2012-2018); PMLQ (2002-2012)
- Parent: Ghulam Muhammad Maneka (father)

Mian Ahmad Raza Maneka is a Pakistani politician serving as a member of the National Assembly of Pakistan representing NA-139 (Pakpattan-I) since February 2024, affiliated with the Pakistan Muslim League (Nawaz). He previously held the same position from 2002 to 2008 and from 2018 to 2023. He received his earlier education from Aitchison College where he won the annual Aitchison Challenge Cup for 'best athlete' for 3 years consecutively (1979, 1980 and 1981). He then went on to receive his bachelor's degree from the University of Miami in 1987.

== Political career ==
He was first elected to the National Assembly of Pakistan as MNA from NA-165 (Pakpattan) in the 2002 Pakistani general election. During this tenure, he served as Chairman of Standing Committee on Cabinet. He was elected as MNA for the second time from Constituency NA-145 (Pakpattan-I) as a candidate of Pakistan Muslim League (N) in the 2018 Pakistani general election and received 118,581 votes. During this tenure, he was Federal Parliamentary Secretary for Food Security & Research. He was elected as MNA for the third time from NA-139 (Pakpattan-I) as a candidate of Pakistan Muslim League (N) in the 2024 Pakistani general election and received 121,383 votes.
