= Ammara Khan =

Pakistani politician

Amra Khan

Member of the National Assembly of Pakistan
- In office 3 June 2013 – 31 May 2018
- Constituency: Reserved seat for women

Personal details
- Party: Pakistan Muslim League (N)

Amra Khan (Urdu: آمارہ خان) is a Pakistani politician who had been a member of the National Assembly of Pakistan from June 2013 to May 2018.

== Education ==
She has done post-Master's Diploma in Clinical Psychology and holds the Master of Science degree in Applied Psychology.

== Political career ==
She was elected to the National Assembly of Pakistan as a candidate of Pakistan Muslim League (N) on reserved seats for women from Punjab in the 2013 Pakistani general election.

On 13 May 2024, the Election Commission of Pakistan (ECP) suspended her membership as a member of the Provincial Assembly of the Punjab. This action followed a Supreme Court of Pakistan decision to suspend the verdict of the Peshawar High Court, which had denied the allocation of a reserved seat to the PTI-Sunni Ittehad Council bloc.
