= Aliya Kamran =

Pakistani politician

Member of the National Assembly of Pakistan
- In office 29 February 2024 – present
- Constituency: Reserved seat for women
- In office 13 August 2018 – 10 August 2023
- Constituency: Reserved seat for women
- In office 1 June 2013 – 31 May 2018
- Constituency: Reserved seat for women

Personal details
- Party: JUI (F) (2013-present)

Aliya Kamran (Urdu: عالیہ کامران) is a Pakistani politician who has been a member of the National Assembly of Pakistan since February 2024 . Previously she was a member of the National Assembly from 2018 to 2023 and from 2013 to 2018.

== Political career ==
She was elected to the National Assembly of Pakistan as a candidate of Jamiat Ulema-e-Islam (F) on reserved seats for women from Balochistan in the 2013 Pakistani general election.

She was re-elected to the National Assembly as a candidate of Muttahida Majlis-e-Amal (MMA) on a reserved seat for women from Balochistan in the 2018 Pakistani general election.
