= Ghazi Ghulab Jamal =

Pakistani politician

Syiad Ghazi Gulab Jamal
- سید غازی گلاب جمال

Member of the National Assembly of Pakistan
- In office 1 June 2013 – 31 May 2018
- Constituency: NA-39 (Orakzai Agency)
- In office 18 November 2002 – 18 November 2007
- Constituency: NA-39 (Orakzai Agency)

Personal details
- Born: 2 February 1954 (age 72)
- Children: Syed Ghazi Ghazan Jamal Orakzai (son)

Syiad Ghazi Gulab Jamal (Urdu: سید غازی گلاب جمال; born 2 February 1954) is a Pakistani politician who had been a member of the National Assembly of Pakistan from 2002 to 2007 and again from June 2013 to May 2018.

== Early life ==
He was born on 2 February 1954.

== Political career ==
He was elected to the National Assembly of Pakistan as an independent candidate from Constituency NA-39 (Tribal Area-IV) in the 2002 Pakistani general election. He received 11,186 votes and defeated an independent candidate, Mian Hussain Jalali.

He ran for the seat of the National Assembly as an independent candidate from Constituency NA-16 (Hangu) in the 2008 Pakistani general election but was unsuccessful. He secured only 16,404 votes and lost the seat to the ANP candidate, Syed Haider Ali Shah.

He was re-elected to the National Assembly as an independent candidate from Constituency NA-39 (Tribal Area-IV) in the 2013 Pakistani general election. He received 7,922 votes and defeated Jawad Hussain, a candidate of Pakistan Peoples Party.
