= Constituency NA-129 =

Former constituency of the National Assembly of Pakistan

NA-129 (Lahore-XII)
- Former constituency for the National Assembly of Pakistan
- Region: Lahore District

Former constituency
- Created: 2002
- Abolished: 2018

NA-129 (Lahore-XII) (Urdu: این اے-۱۲۹، لاهور-۱۲) was a constituency for the National Assembly of Pakistan. After the 2018 delimitations, its areas were divided among NA-132 (Lahore-X) and NA-134 (Lahore-XII).

== Election 2002 ==
General elections were held on 10 Oct 2002. Major(R) Habibullah Warriach of PML-Q won by 39,420 votes.

General election 2002: NA-129 Lahore-XII
Party	Candidate	Votes	%	±%
PML(Q)	Habibullah Waraich	39,420	50.13	
PML(N)	Sardar Arif Rashid	20,111	25.57	
PPP	Dr. Ch. Zahid Akram Nat	17,314	22.02	
Others	Others (four candidates)	1,794	2.28	
Turnout		80,988	38.29	
Total valid votes		78,639	97.10	
Rejected ballots		2,349	2.90	
Majority		19,309	24.56	
Registered electors		211,530		

== Election 2008 ==
General elections were held on 18 Feb 2008. Tariq Shabbir of PPP won by 36,604 votes.

General election 2008: NA-129 Lahore-XII
Party	Candidate	Votes	%	±%
PPP	Tariq Shabir	36,604	39.06	
PML(Q)	Habib Ullah Warraich	29,058	31.01	
PML(N)	Sardar Adil Umar	25,918	27.66	
Others	Others (five candidates)	2,137	2.27	
Turnout		96,154	47.85	
Total valid votes		93,717	97.47	
Rejected ballots		2,437	2.53	
Majority		7,546	8.05	
Registered electors		200,935		

== Election 2013 ==
General elections were held on 11 May 2013. Mian Muhammad Shehbaz Sharif of PML-N won the election against PTI candidates Chauhdary Mansha

General election 2013: NA-129 Lahore-XII
Party	Candidate	Votes	%	±%
PML(N)	Mian Muhammad Shehbaz Sharif	94,007	63.84	
PTI	Muhammad Mansha	35,781	24.30	
PPP	Tariq Shabir	11,633	7.90	
Others	Others (twenty one candidates)	5,836	3.96	
Turnout		150,649	55.05	
Total valid votes		147,257	97.75	
Rejected ballots		3,392	2.25	
Majority		58,226	39.54	
Registered electors		273,648		

== By-Election 2013 ==
By-Election 2013: NA-129 Lahore-XII
Party	Candidate	Votes	%	±%
PML(N)	Shazia Mubashar	44,894	58.60	
PTI	Muhammad Mansha Sindhu	26,071	34.03	
PPP	Muhammad Ashraf Bhatti	3,800	4.96	
Others	Others (twelve candidates)	1,842	2.41	
Turnout		77,788	28.41	
Total valid votes		76,607	98.48	
Rejected ballots		1,181	1.52	
Majority		18,823	24.57	
Registered electors		273,769		
