= NA-131 Kasur-I =

Constituency of the National Assembly of Pakistan

- Constituency for the National Assembly of Pakistan
- Region: Kasur Tehsil Tehsil (partly) including Mustafabad town and Kasur city of Kasur District
- Electorate: 567,451

Current constituency
- Party: Pakistan Muslim League (N)
- Member: Saad Waseem Akhtar Sheikh
- Created from: NA-138 Kasur-I

NA-131 Kasur-I (این اے-131، قصور-۱) is a constituency for the National Assembly of Pakistan.

== Members of Parliament ==
=== 2018–2023: NA-137 Kasur-I ===
Election	Member	Party
2018	Saad Waseem Akhtar Sheikh	PML (N)

=== 2024–present: NA-131 Kasur-I ===
Election	Member	Party
2024	Saad Waseem Akhtar Sheikh	PML (N)

== Election 2002 ==
General elections were held on 10 October 2002. Sardar Tufail Ahmad Khan of PML-Q won by 39,781 votes.

General election 2002: NA-138 Kasur-I
Party	Candidate	Votes	%	±%
PML(Q)	Sardar Tufail Ahmad Khan	39,781	34.23	
PML(N)	Rao Mazhar Hayat Khan	33,326	28.68	
PPP	Malik Akhtar Husssain Noul.	24,835	21.37	
MMA	Dr. Sahibzada Abu-AI-Khair Muhammad Zubair	11,408	9.82	
Independent	Rana Abdul Ghaffar	3,361	2.89	
Others	Others (eight candidates)	3,500	3.01	
Turnout		119,756	48.82	
Total valid votes		116,211	97.04	
Rejected ballots		3,545	2.96	
Majority		6,455	5.55	
Registered electors		245,303		

== Election 2008 ==
General elections were held on 18 February 2008. Rao Mazhar Hayat Khan of PML-N won by 58,832 votes.

General election 2008: NA-138 Kasur-I
Party	Candidate	Votes	%	±%
PML(N)	Rao Mazhar Hayat Khan	58,832	44.49	
PML(Q)	Sardar Tufail Ahmad Khan	39,986	30.24	
PPP	Tariq Hakam Ali	30,630	23.16	
Others	Others (seven candidates)	2,795	2.11	
Turnout		136,259	58.61	
Total valid votes		132,243	97.05	
Rejected ballots		4,016	2.95	
Majority		18,846	14.25	
Registered electors		242,483		
PML(N) gain from PML(Q)				

== Election 2013 ==
General elections were held on 11 May 2013. Salman Hanif of PML-N won by 75,694 votes and became the member of National Assembly.

General election 2013: NA-138 Kasur-I
Party	Candidate	Votes	%	±%
PML(N)	Salman Hanif	75,694	41.58	
Independent	Sardar Tufail Ahmad Khan	28,401	15.60	
Independent	Sadia Bano	26,441	14.52	
PPP	Nasira Meo	20,526	11.27	
PTI	Hassan Ali Khan	13,127	7.21	
Others	Others (eleven candidates)	17,864	9.82	
Turnout		188,358	66.66	
Total valid votes		182,053	96.65	
Rejected ballots		6,305	3.35	
Majority		47,293	25.98	
Registered electors		282,555		
PML(N) hold				

== Election 2018 ==
General elections were held on 25 July 2018.

General election 2018: NA-137 Kasur-I
Party	Candidate	Votes	%	±%
PML(N)	Saad Waseem Akhtar Sheikh	121,207	45.62	
PTI	Aseff Ahmad Ali	42,930	16.16	
PPP	Chaudhary Manzoor Ahmed	33,713	12.69	
Independent	Nasira Meo	28,876	10.87	
TLP	Muhammad Farooqul Hassan	17,349	6.53	
Others	Others (thirteen candidates)	21,589	8.13	
Turnout		274,167	58.91	
Total valid votes		265,668	96.90	
Rejected ballots		8,499	3.10	
Majority		78,277	29.46	
Registered electors		465,431		
PML(N) hold		Swing	N/A	

== Election 2024 ==
General elections were held on 8 February 2024. Saad Waseem Akhtar Sheikh won the election with 110,556 votes.

General election 2024: NA-131 Kasur-I
Party	Candidate	Votes	%	±%
PML(N)	Saad Waseem Akhtar Sheikh	110,556	37.54	▼8.08
PTI	Muhammad Maqsood Sabir Ansari (Note: Filed nomination papers as PTI candidate but ECP allowed him to run as an Independent)	79,545	27.01	▲10.85
PPP	Chaudhary Manzoor Ahmed	44,681	15.17	▲2.48
TLP	Hafiz Muneeb Ahmed	33,711	11.45	▲4.92
Others	Others (fourteen candidates)	26,041	8.84	
Turnout		303,333	53.46	▼5.45
Total valid votes		294,534	97.10	
Rejected ballots		8,799	2.90	
Majority		31,011	10.53	▼18.93
Registered electors		567,451		
PML(N) hold		Swing	N/A	

== See also ==
- NA-130 Lahore-XIV
- NA-132 Kasur-II
