= NA-272 (Kech-cum-Gwadar) =

Former constituency of the National Assembly of Pakistan

- Former constituency for the National Assembly of Pakistan
- Region: Kech District; Gwadar District

Former constituency
- Abolished: 2018
- Replaced by: NA-271 (Kech); NA-272 (Lasbela-cum-Gwadar)

NA-272 (Kech-cum-Gwadar) (Urdu: این اے-١٧۲) was a constituency for the National Assembly of Pakistan in Balochistan.

== Election 2002 ==
General elections were held on 10 October 2002. Zubaida Jalal Khan an independent candidate won by 44,177 votes.

General election 2002: NA-272 Kech-cum-Gwadar
Party	Candidate	Votes	%	±%
Independent	Zubada Jalal	44,177	49.63	
BNM	Dr. Abdul Malik	36,169	40.64	
MMA	Abdul Haque	6,252	7.02	
Others	Others (two candidates)	2,410	2.71	
Turnout		92,043	32.67	
Total valid votes		89,008	96.70	
Rejected ballots		3,035	3.30	
Majority		8,008	8.99	
Registered electors		281,748		

== Election 2008 ==
General elections were held on 18 February 2008. Yaqoob Bizenjo of Balochistan National Party won by 61,655 votes.

General election 2008: NA-272 Kech-cum-Gwadar
Party	Candidate	Votes	%	±%
BNP (A)	Yaqoob Bizenjo	61,655	59.32	
Independent	Zubada Jalal	33,564	32.29	
PPP	Dr. Muhammad Haider Baloch	3,514	3.38	
PML(N)	Abdul Qadeer	2,448	2.36	
Others	Others (two candidates)	2,757	2.65	
Turnout		107,930	34.07	
Total valid votes		103,938	96.30	
Rejected ballots		3,992	3.70	
Majority		28,091	27.03	
Registered electors		316,766		

== Election 2013 ==
General elections were held on 11 May 2013. Sayed Essa Nori of Balochistan National Party won by 15,835 votes and became the member of National Assembly.

General election 2013: NA-272 Kech-cum-Gwadar
Party	Candidate	Votes	%	±%
BNP (M)	Syed Essa Nori	15,835	37.81	
NP	Muhammad Yasin Baloch	15,316	36.57	
BNP (A)	Abdul Rauf Rind	5,147	12.29	
JUI (F)	Abdul Hameed	2,973	7.10	
JI	Gulab Baloch	1,108	2.65	
Others	Others (six candidates)	1,502	3.58	
Turnout		43,025	16.07	
Total valid votes		41,881	97.34	
Rejected ballots		1,144	2.66	
Majority		519	1.24	
Registered electors		267,667		
