= NA-47 (Orakzai) =

Constituency of the National Assembly of Pakistan

NA-47 (Tribal Area-VIII)
- Former constituency for the National Assembly of Pakistan
- Region: Orakzai District
- Electorate: 167,206

Former constituency
- Abolished: 2024
- Member: Vacant
- Created from: NA-39 (Tribal Area-IV)
- Replaced by: NA-36 Hangu-cum-Orakzai

NA-47 (Tribal Area-VIII) (Urdu: این اے-۳۹، قباَئلی علاقہ-۴) is a constituency for the National Assembly of Pakistan comprising Orakzai District.

== Members of Parliament ==
=== 2002–2018: NA-39 (Tribal Area-IV) ===
Election	Member	Party
2002	Syed Ghazi Gulab Jamal	Independent
2008	Jawad Hussain	Independent
2013	Syed Ghazi Gulab Jamal	Independent

=== Since 2018: NA-47 (Tribal Area-VIII) ===
Election	Member	Party
2018	Malik Jawad Hussain	PTI

== Election 2002 ==
General elections were held on 10 Oct 2002. Ghazi Gulab Jamal an independent candidate won by 11,186 votes.

== Election 2008 ==
The result of general election 2008 in this constituency is given below.

=== Result ===
Jawad Hussain succeeded in the election 2008 and became the member of National Assembly.

General Election 2008: Tribal Area-IV
Party	Candidate	Votes	%
Independent	Jawad Hussain	21,844	45
Independent	Dr. Gul Karim Khan	8,247	17
Independent	Malik Atiq ur Rehman Orakzai	5,618	12
Others	Others	13,417	26

== Election 2013 ==
General elections were held on 11 May 2013. Ghazi Gulab Jamali an independent candidate won by 7,922 votes and became the member of National Assembly.

== Election 2018 ==
General elections were held on 25 July 2018.

General election 2018: NA-47 (Tribal Area-VIII)
Party	Candidate	Votes	%	±%
PTI	Malik Jawad Hussain	11,102	20.64	
MMA	Qasim Gul	6,898	12.82	
Independent	Zabit Gul	6,439	11.97	
MQP	Habib Noor	5,472	10.17	
Independent	Abdul Shahid	5,245	9.75	
Independent	Malik Syed Noor Akbar	4,485	8.34	
Independent	Malik Gul Kareem Khan	3,146	5.85	
Independent	Gul Muhammad	1,985	3.69	
PPP	Iqbal Hussain	1,981	3.68	
ANP	Syed Basharat Hussain	1,270	2.36	
QWP	Assamuddin	1,051	1.95	
Independent	Syed Mudeel Hussain	846	1.57	
Independent	Rafiullah	837	1.56	
Independent	Sohrab Khan	778	1.45	
Independent	Syed Ghaazan Ghazan Jamal	765	1.42	
Others	Others (sixteen candidates)	1,490	2.77	
Turnout		54,966	32.87	
Total valid votes		53,790	97.86	
Rejected ballots		1,176	2.14	
Majority		4,204	7.82	
Registered electors		167,206		
PTI gain from Independent				

== See also ==
- NA-46 (Tribal Area-VII)
- NA-48 (Tribal Area-IX)
