= Aisha Syed (politician) =

Pakistani politician

Member of the National Assembly of Pakistan
- In office 1 June 2013 – 31 May 2018
- Constituency: Reserved seat for women

Personal details
- Party: Jamaat-e-Islami Pakistan

Aisha Syed (Urdu: عاعشہ سید) is a Pakistani politician who had been a member of the National Assembly of Pakistan from June 2013 to May 2018.

== Political career ==
She was elected to the National Assembly of Pakistan as a candidate of Jamaat-e-Islami Pakistan on reserved seats for women from Khyber Paktunkhwa in the 2013 Pakistani general election.
