= Sardar Kamal Khan Bangulzai =

Pakistani politician

Member of the National Assembly of Pakistan
- In office 1 June 2013 – 31 May 2018
- Constituency: NA-268 (Kalat-cum-Mastung)

Personal details
- Born: December 13, 1972 (age 53)
- Party: National Party (Pakistan)

Sardar Kamal Khan Bangulzai (Urdu: سردار کمال خان بنگلزئی; born 13 December 1972) is a Pakistani politician who had been a member of the National Assembly of Pakistan from June 2013 to May 2018.

== Early life ==
He was born on 13 December 1972.

== Political career ==
He ran for the seat of the National Assembly of Pakistan as a candidate of National Party from Constituency NA-268 (Kalat-cum-Mastung) in the 2002 Pakistani general election but was unsuccessful. He received 14,638 votes and lost the seat to Abdul Ghafoor Haideri.

He was elected to the National Assembly as a candidate of National Party from Constituency NA-268 (Kalat-cum-Mastung) in the 2013 Pakistani general election. He received 19,873 votes and defeated Abdul Ghafoor Haideri. In the same election, he ran for the seat of the Provincial Assembly of Balochistan as a candidate of National Party from Constituency PB-30 (Kachhi-I) but was unsuccessful. He received 1,256 votes and lost the seat to Mir Mohammad Asim Kurd Gello.
