= Ayesha Raza Farooq =

Pakistani politician

Ayesha Raza Farooq Senator
- عائشہ رضا فاروق

Member of the Senate of Pakistan
- In office March 2015 – March 2021

Member of the National Assembly of Pakistan
- In office 1 June 2013 – March 2015

Personal details
- Other political affiliations: Pakistan Muslim League (N)
- Spouse: Raza Farooq Ramday
- Relatives: Muhammad Aurangzeb (brother-in-law)
- Education: Lahore University of Management Sciences (MBA); Punjab University Law College (L.L.B); University of Punjab

Ayesha Raza Farooq (Urdu: عائشہ رضا فاروق) is a Pakistani politician who has been a member of the Senate of Pakistan since March 2015. Previously she had been a member of the National Assembly of Pakistan from 2013 to 2015.

== Early life and education ==
Ayesha Raza Farooq is a member of Ramday Arain family. Her husband, Raza Farooq Ramday, served as the Advocate General of Punjab from June 2009 to August 2009. He died in 2010 due to cardiac arrest. His brother-in-law, Muhammad Aurangzeb, is the current finance minister of Pakistan.

She earned master of business administration from Lahore University of Management Sciences in 1995 and a Bachelor of Laws degree from the University of Punjab in 2013.

== Political career ==
She was elected to the National Assembly of Pakistan as a candidate of Pakistan Muslim League (N) (PML-N) on reserved seats for women from Punjab in the 2013 Pakistani general election. In November 2013, she was appointed as Prime Minister's focal person on polio eradication. She resigned from National Assembly in March 2015.

She was elected to the Senate of Pakistan on reserved seat for women as a candidate of PML-N in the 2015 Pakistani Senate election.

In March 2018, she received Sitara-i-Imtiaz from the Government of Pakistan for her role in polio eradication.
