= Kiran Haider =

Pakistani politician

Member of the National Assembly of Pakistan
- In office 1 June 2013 – 31 May 2018
- Constituency: Reserved seat for women

Personal details
- Party: PMLN (2013-present)

Kiran Haider (Urdu: کرن حیدر) is a Pakistani politician who had been a member of the National Assembly of Pakistan, from June 2013 to May 2018.

== Political career ==
She was elected to the National Assembly of Pakistan as a candidate of Pakistan Muslim League (N) on a reserved seat for women from Balochistan in the 2013 Pakistani general election.
