= Alizeh Iqbal Haider =

Pakistani politician

- علیزہ اقبال حیدر

Member of the National Assembly of Pakistan
- In office 1 June 2013 – 12 August 2015
- Constituency: Reserved seat for women

Personal details
- Party: Pakistan Peoples Party
- Parent: Iqbal Haider (father)

Alizeh Iqbal Haider (Urdu: علیزہ اقبال حیدر) is a Pakistani politician. She was a member of the National Assembly of Pakistan from 2013 to 2015.

== Biography ==
Haider's father was Iqbal Haider.. She is barrister by profession and a human rights activist.

Haider was indirectly elected to the National Assembly of Pakistan as a candidate of Pakistan Peoples Party on a reserved seat for women in the 2013 Pakistani general election. She served as spokesperson for Pakistan Peoples Party chairman Bilawal Bhutto Zardari. In November 2015, she resigned from her National Assembly seat for personal reasons.
