= Constituency NA-164 =

Former constituency of the National Assembly of Pakistan

Constituency NA-164 (Pakpattan-I)
- Former constituency for the National Assembly of Pakistan
- Region: Pakpattan District

Former constituency
- Created: 2002
- Abolished: 2018
- Replaced by: NA-145 (Pakpattan-I)

Constituency NA-164 (Pakpattan-I) (Urdu: این اے-۱۶۴، پاکپتّن-۱) was a constituency for the National Assembly of Pakistan. After the 2018 delimitations, it has been merged into NA-145 (Pakpattan-I).

== Election 2002 ==
General elections were held on 10 Oct 2002. Pir Muhammad Shah Khaggah of PML-Q won by 65,494 votes.

General election 2002: NA-164 Pakpattan-I
Party	Candidate	Votes	%	±%
PML(Q)	Pir Muhammad Shah Khaggah	65,494	55.64	
PPP	Rao Muhammad Hashim Khan	46,175	39.23	
Independent	Ahmed Din	5,526	4.70	
Independent	Nadeem Iqbal	506	0.43	
Turnout		122,371	53.20	
Total valid votes		117,701	96.18	
Rejected ballots		4,670	3.82	
Majority		19,319	16.41	
Registered electors		230,030		

== Election 2008 ==
General elections were held on 18 Feb 2008. Sardar Munsib Ali Dogar of PML-N won by 35,597 votes.

General election 2008: NA-164 Pakpattan-I
Party	Candidate	Votes	%	±%
PML(N)	Sardar Mansab Ali Dogar	35,597	31.47	
PML(Q)	Pir Muhammad Shah Khaggah	34,196	30.23	
PPP	Rao Muhammad Jameel Hashim Khan	26,315	23.27	
Independent	Mian Muhammad Farrukh Mumtaz Khan	16,783	14.84	
Independent	Nadeem Iqbal	218	0.19	
Turnout		117,995	58.53	
Total valid votes		113,109	95.86	
Rejected ballots		4,886	4.14	
Majority		1,401	1.24	
Registered electors		201,597		

== Election 2013 ==
General elections were held on 11 May 2013. Sardar Mansab Ali Dogar of PML-N won by 67,984 votes and became the member of National Assembly.

General election 2013: NA-164 Pakpattan-I
Party	Candidate	Votes	%	±%
PML(N)	Sardar Mansab Ali Dogar	67,984	41.54	
PML(Q)	Muhammad Shah Khagga	65,630	40.10	
PTI	Naseem Hashim Khan	27,958	17.08	
Others	Others (three candidates)	2,101	1.28	
Turnout		169,885	65.14	
Total valid votes		163,673	96.34	
Rejected ballots		6,212	3.66	
Majority		2,354	1.44	
Registered electors		260,811		
