= Constituency NA-98 =

Former constituency of the National Assembly of Pakistan

Constituency NA-98 (Gujranwala-IV)
- Former constituency for the National Assembly of Pakistan
- Region: Gujranwala District

Former constituency
- Abolished: 2018

Constituency NA-98 (Gujranwala-IV) (Urdu: این اے-٩۸، گجرانوالہ-۴) was a constituency for the National Assembly of Pakistan. After the 2018 delimitation, its constituent areas have been divided into the surrounding newly delineated constituencies of Gujranwala. This was done because the district lost 1 National Assembly seat after the population count of the 2017 census.

== Election 2002 ==
General elections were held on 10 Oct 2002. Imtiaz Safdar of PPP won by 45,655 votes.

General election 2002: NA-98 Gujranwala-IV
Party	Candidate	Votes	%	±%
PPP	Imtiaz Safdar Warraich	45,655	34.69	
PML(Q)	Muhammad Azam Cheema	37,523	28.51	
PML(J)	Ch. Muhammad Ashraf Warriach	21,207	16.11	
MMA	Bilal Qudrat Butt	17,800	13.52	
PML(N)	Sardar Zia-Ul-Haq	7,366	5.60	
Others	Others (four candidates)	2,062	1.57	
Turnout		136,693	47.80	
Total valid votes		131,614	96.28	
Rejected ballots		5,079	3.72	
Majority		8,132	6.18	
Registered electors		285,993		

== Election 2008 ==
General elections were held on 18 Feb 2008. Imtiaz Safdar of PPP won by 68,509 votes.

General election 2008: NA-98 Gujranwala-IV
Party	Candidate	Votes	%	±%
PPP	Imtiaz Safdar Warraich	68,509	46.93	
PML(N)	Asif Aqeel	46,992	32.19	
PML(Q)	Ch. Shamshad Ahmad Khan	30,259	20.73	
Others	Others (six candidates)	228	0.15	
Turnout		150,781	40.91	
Total valid votes		145,988	96.82	
Rejected ballots		4,793	3.18	
Majority		21,517	14.74	
Registered electors		368,599		

== Election 2013 ==
General elections were held on 11 May 2013. Mian Tariq Mehmood of PML-N won by 118,832 votes and became the member of National Assembly.

General election 2013: NA-98 Gujranwala-IV
Party	Candidate	Votes	%	±%
PML(N)	Mian Tariq Mehmood	118,832	58.89	
PPP	Imtiaz Safdar Warraich	37,372	18.52	
PTI	Rana Shehzad Hafeez	20,778	10.30	
JI	Bilal Qudrat Butt	12,795	6.34	
PML(J)	Adil Farooq Khan	7,295	3.62	
Others	Others (sixteen candidates)	4,704	2.33	
Turnout		207,946	57.25	
Total valid votes		201,776	97.03	
Rejected ballots		6,170	2.97	
Majority		81,460	40.37	
Registered electors		363,205		
