= List of members of the 13th National Assembly of Pakistan =

13th National Assembly
←	12th National Assembly	14th National Assembly	→
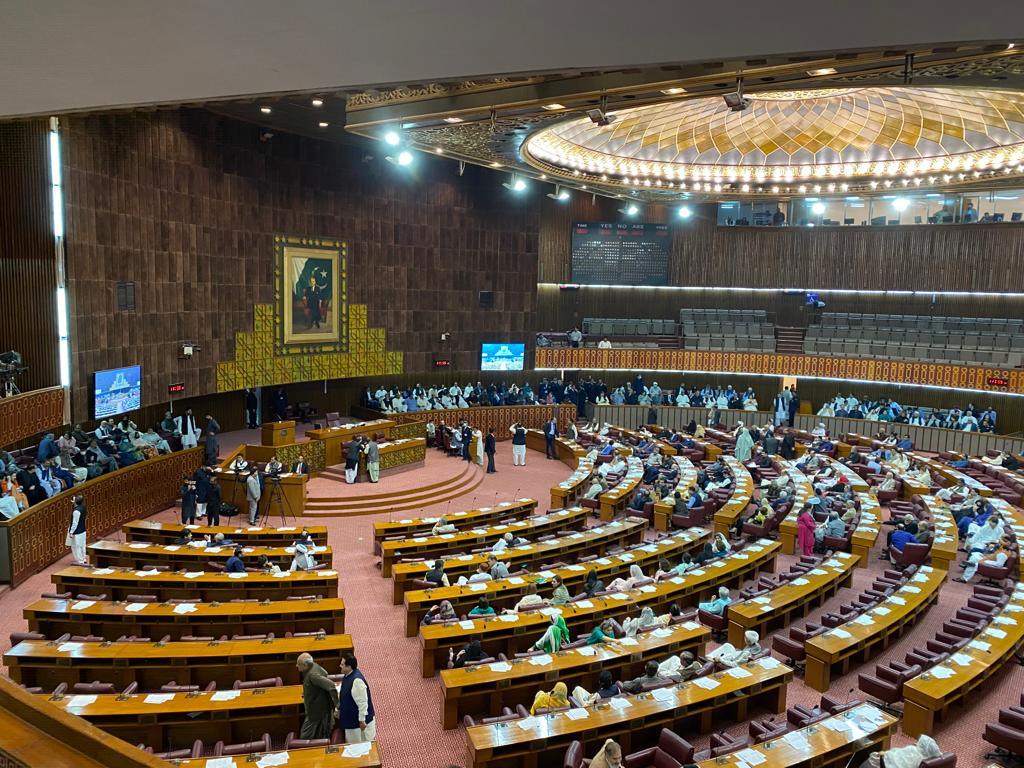

Overview
- Legislative body: National Assembly of Pakistan
- Jurisdiction: Pakistan
- Meeting place: Parliament House, Islamabad-44030
- Term: 2008 – 2013
- Election: 2008 Pakistani general election
- Government: Government of Pakistan
- Website: Official website

National Assembly of Pakistan
- Members: 342
- Speaker: Chaudhry Amir Hussain; Fahmida Mirza
- Prime Minister: Yusuf Raza Gilani; Raja Pervaiz Ashraf
- Leader of the Opposition: Parvez Elahi; Nisar Ali Khan
- President: Pervez Musharraf; Asif Ali Zardari

The 13th Parliament of Pakistan is the legislature of Pakistan following the 2008 general election of members of parliament (MPs) to the National Assembly of Pakistan, the lower house of the bicameral Majlis-e-Shura. The National Assembly is a democratically elected body consisting of 342 members, who are referred to as Members of the National Assembly (MNAs), of which 272 are directly elected members; 70 reserved seats for women and religious minorities are allocated to the political parties according to their proportion of the total vote.

== Members ==
Region	Constituency	Political party	Member	Ref
Khyber Pakhtunkhwa	NA-1 (Peshawar-I)	Awami National Party	Ghulam Ahmad Bilour	
Khyber Pakhtunkhwa	NA-2 (Peshawar-II)	Pakistan Peoples Party	Arbab Alamgir Khan	
Khyber Pakhtunkhwa	NA-3 (Peshawar-III)	Pakistan Peoples Party	Noor Alam Khan	
Khyber Pakhtunkhwa	NA-4 (Peshawar-IV)	Awami National Party	Arbab Muhammad Zahir	
Khyber Pakhtunkhwa	NA-5 (Nowshera-I)	Pakistan Peoples Party	Muhammad Tariq Khattak	
Khyber Pakhtunkhwa	NA-6 (Nowshera-II)	Awami National Party	Masood Abbas	
Khyber Pakhtunkhwa	NA-7 (Charsadda-I)	Awami National Party	Asfandyar Wali Khan	
Khyber Pakhtunkhwa	NA-8 (Charsadda-II)	Pakistan Peoples Party (Sherpao)	Aftab Ahmad Sherpao	
Khyber Pakhtunkhwa	NA-9 (Mardan-I)	Awami National Party	Himayat Ullah Mayar	
Khyber Pakhtunkhwa	NA-10 (Mardan-II)	Muttahida Majlis-e-Amal	Moulana Mohammad Qasim	
Khyber Pakhtunkhwa	NA-11 (Mardan-III)	Pakistan Peoples Party	Khanzada Khan	
Khyber Pakhtunkhwa	NA-12 (Swabi-I)	Independent	Usman Khan Tarrakai	
Khyber Pakhtunkhwa	NA-13 (Swabi-II)	Awami National Party	Pervaiz Khan	
Khyber Pakhtunkhwa	NA-14 (Kohat)	Awami National Party	Pir Dilawar Shah	
Khyber Pakhtunkhwa	NA-15 (Karak)	Muttahida Majlis-e-Amal	Mufti Ajmal Khan	
Khyber Pakhtunkhwa	NA-16 (Hangu)	Awami National Party	Syed Haider Ali Shah	
Khyber Pakhtunkhwa	NA-17 (Abbottabad-I)	Pakistan Muslim League (N)	Sardar Mehtab Ahmed Khan	
Khyber Pakhtunkhwa	NA-18 (Abbottabad-II)	Pakistan Muslim League (N)	Murtaza Javed Abbasi	
Khyber Pakhtunkhwa	NA-19 (Haripur)	Pakistan Muslim League (N)	Muhammad Mushtaq Khan	
Khyber Pakhtunkhwa	NA-20 (Mansehra-I)	Pakistan Muslim League (Q)	Sardar Shahjehan Yousaf	
Khyber Pakhtunkhwa	NA-21 (Mansehra-II)	Muttahida Majlis-e-Amal	Laiq Muhammad Khan	
Khyber Pakhtunkhwa	NA-22 (Battagram)	Pakistan Muslim League (Q)	Muhammad Nawaz Allai	
Khyber Pakhtunkhwa	NA-23 (Kohistan)	Pakistan Peoples Party	Mehboob Ullah Jan	
Khyber Pakhtunkhwa	NA-24 (D.I.Khan)	Pakistan Peoples Party	Faisal Karim Kundi	
Khyber Pakhtunkhwa	NA-25 (D.I.Khan-Tank)	Muttahida Majlis-e-Amal	Atta-ur-Rahman	
Khyber Pakhtunkhwa	NA-26 (Bannu)	Muttahida Majlis-e-Amal	Maulana Fazl-ur-Rehman	
Khyber Pakhtunkhwa	NA-27 (Lakki Marwat)	Pakistan Muslim League (Q)	Humayun Saifullah Khan	
Khyber Pakhtunkhwa	NA-28 (Buner)	Awami National Party	Istiqbal Khan	
Khyber Pakhtunkhwa	NA-29 (Swat-I)	Awami National Party	Muzafer-ul-Mulk	
Khyber Pakhtunkhwa	NA-30 (Swat-II)	Pakistan Peoples Party	Syed Alla-ud-Din	
Khyber Pakhtunkhwa	NA-31 (Shangla)	Pakistan Muslim League (Q)	Amir Muqam	
Khyber Pakhtunkhwa	NA-32 (Chitral)	Pakistan Muslim League (Q)	Muhi-ud-din	
Khyber Pakhtunkhwa	NA-33 (Upper Dir)	Pakistan Peoples Party	Najmuddin Khan	
Khyber Pakhtunkhwa	NA-34 (Lower Dir)	Pakistan Peoples Party	Malak Azmat Khan	
Khyber Pakhtunkhwa	NA-35 (Malakand)	Pakistan Peoples Party	Lal Muhammad Khan	
FATA	NA-36 (Mohmand Agency)	Independent	Bilal Rehman	
FATA	NA-37 (Kurram Agency)	Independent	Sajid Hussain	
FATA	NA-38 (Kurram Agency)	Independent	Munir Khan Orakzai	
FATA	NA-39 (Orakzai Agency)	Independent	Jawad Hussain	
FATA	NA-40 (North Waziristan Agency)	Independent	Mohammad Kamran Khan	
FATA	NA-41 (South Waziristan Agency)	Independent	Abdul Maalik Wazir	
FATA	NA-42 (South Waziristan Agency)	—	Vacant	
FATA	NA-43 (Bajaur Agency)	—	Vacant	
FATA	NA-44 (Bajaur Agency)	Independent	Akhonzada Chitan	
FATA	NA-45 (Khyber Agency)	Independent	Noor-ul-Haq Qadri	
FATA	NA-46 (Khyber Agency)	Independent	Hameed Ullah Jan Afridi	
FATA	NA-47 (Frontier Regions)	Independent	Zafar Beg Bhittani	
Islamabad	NA-48 (Islamabad-I)	Pakistan Muslim League (N)	Anjum Aqeel Khan	
Islamabad	NA-49 (Islamabad-II)	Pakistan Muslim League (N)	Tariq Fazal Chaudhary	
Punjab	NA-50 (Rawalpindi-I)	Pakistan Muslim League (N)	Shahid Khaqan Abbasi	
Punjab	NA-51 (Rawalpindi-II)	Pakistan Peoples Party	Raja Pervez Ashraf	
Punjab	NA-52 (Rawalpindi-III)	Pakistan Muslim League (N)	Muhammad Safdar Awan	
Punjab	NA-53 (Rawalpindi-IV)	Pakistan Muslim League (N)	Nisar Ali Khan	
Punjab	NA-54 (Rawalpindi-V)	Pakistan Muslim League (N)	Malik Abrar Ahmad	
Punjab	NA-55 (Rawalpindi-VI)	Pakistan Muslim League (N)	Malik Shakeel Awan	
Punjab	NA-56 (Rawalpindi-VII)	Pakistan Muslim League (N)	Muhammad Hanif Abbasi	
Punjab	NA-57 (Attock-I)	Pakistan Muslim League (N)	Sheikh Aftab Ahmed	
Punjab	NA-58 (Attock-II)	Pakistan Muslim League (Q)	Chaudhry Pervaiz Elahi	
Punjab	NA-59 (Attock-III)	Pakistan Peoples Party	Sardar Salim Haider Khan	
Punjab	NA-60 (Chakwal-I)	Pakistan Muslim League (N)	Ayaz Amir	
Punjab	NA-61 (Chakwal-II)	Pakistan Muslim League (N)	Sardar Mumtaz Khan	
Punjab	NA-62 (Jhelum-I)	Pakistan Muslim League (N)	Raja Muhammad Safdar Khan	
Punjab	NA-63 (Jhelum-II)	Pakistan Muslim League (N)	Raja Muhammad Asad Khan	
Punjab	NA-64 (Sargodha-I)	Pakistan Peoples Party	Nadeem Afzal Gondal	
Punjab	NA-65 (Sargodha-II)	Pakistan Muslim League (Q)	Ghias Mela	
Punjab	NA-66 (Sargodha-III)	Pakistan Peoples Party	Tasneem Ahmed Qureshi	
Punjab	NA-67 (Sargodha-IV)	Pakistan Muslim League (Q)	Anwar Ali Cheema	
Punjab	NA-68 (Sargodha-V)	Pakistan Muslim League (N)	Sardar Shafqat Hayat Khan	
Punjab	NA-69 (Khushab-I)	—	Vacant	
Punjab	NA-70 (Khushab-II)	Pakistan Muslim League (N)	Malik Shakir Bashir Awan	
Punjab	NA-71 (Mianwali-I)	Pakistan Peoples Party	Nawabzada Malik Amad Khan	
Punjab	NA-72 (Mianwali-II)	Pakistan Muslim League (N)	Humair Hayat Khan Rokhri	
Punjab	NA-73 (Bhakkar-I)	Pakistan Muslim League (N)	Abdul Majeed Khan	
Punjab	NA-74 (Bhakkar-II)	Pakistan Muslim League (N)	Rashid Akbar Khan	
Punjab	NA-75 (Faisalabad-I)	Pakistan Peoples Party	Tariq Mahmood Bajwa	
Punjab	NA-76 (Faisalabad-II)	Pakistan Peoples Party	Malik Nawab Sher Waseer	
Punjab	NA-77 (Faisalabad-III)	Pakistan Muslim League (Q)	Muhammad Asim Nazir	
Punjab	NA-78 (Faisalabad-IV)	Pakistan Peoples Party	Rahela Baloch	
Punjab	NA-79 (Faisalabad-V)	Pakistan Peoples Party	Rana Muhammad Farooq Saeed Khan	
Punjab	NA-80 (Faisalabad-VI)	Pakistan Muslim League (Q)	Rana Asif Tauseef	
Punjab	NA-81 (Faisalabad-VII)	Pakistan Peoples Party	Chaudhry Saeed Iqbal	
Punjab	NA-82 (Faisalabad-VIII)	Pakistan Muslim League (N)	Muhammad Fazal Karim	
Punjab	NA-83 (Faisalabad-IX)	Pakistan Peoples Party	Muhammad Ijaz Virk	
Punjab	NA-84 (Faisalabad-X)	Pakistan Muslim League (N)	Abid Sher Ali	
Punjab	NA-85 (Faisalabad-XI)	Pakistan Muslim League (N)	Akram Ansari	
Punjab	NA-86 (Jhang-I)	Pakistan Peoples Party	Syed Anayat Ali Shah	
Punjab	NA-87 (Jhang-II)	Pakistan Muslim League (Q)	Ghulam Bibi Bharwana	
Punjab	NA-88 (Jhang-III)	Pakistan Muslim League (Q)	Faisal Saleh Hayat	
Punjab	NA-89 (Jhang-IV)	Pakistan Muslim League (Q)	Sheikh Waqas Akram	
Punjab	NA-90 (Jhang-V)	Independent	Saima Akhtar Bharwana	
Punjab	NA-91 (Jhang-VI)	Pakistan Muslim League (Q)	Sahabzada Muhammad Mehboob Sultan	
Punjab	NA-92 (Toba Tek Singh-I)	Pakistan Muslim League (Q)	Farkhanda Amjad	
Punjab	NA-93 (Toba Tek Singh-II)	Pakistan Muslim League (N)	Muhammad Junaid Anwar Chaudhry	
Punjab	NA-94 (Toba Tek Singh-III)	Pakistan Muslim League (Q)	Riaz Fatyana	
Punjab	NA-95 (Gujranwala-I)	Pakistan Muslim League (N)	Usman Ibrahim	
Punjab	NA-96 (Gujranwala-II)	Pakistan Muslim League (N)	Khurram Dastgir Khan	
Punjab	NA-97 (Gujranwala-III)	Pakistan Muslim League (N)	Chaudhry Mehmood Bashir	
Punjab	NA-98 (Gujranwala-IV)	Pakistan Peoples Party	Imtiaz Safdar Warriach	
Punjab	NA-99 (Gujranwala-V)	Pakistan Muslim League (N)	Rana Nazeer Ahmed Khan	
Punjab	NA-100 (Gujranwala-VI)	Pakistan Peoples Party	Chaudry Tussadiq Masud Khan	
Punjab	NA-101 (Gujranwala-VII)	Pakistan Muslim League (N)	Iftikhar Ahmad Cheema	
Punjab	NA-102 (Hafizabad-I)	Pakistan Muslim League (N)	Saira Afzal Tarar	
Punjab	NA-103 (Hafizabad-II)	Pakistan Muslim League (Q)	Liaqat Abbas Bhatti	
Punjab	NA-104 (Gujrat-I)	Pakistan Muslim League (Q)	Chaudhry Wajahat Hussain	
Punjab	NA-105 (Gujrat-II)	Pakistan Peoples Party	Ahmad Mukhtar	
Punjab	NA-106 (Gujrat-III)	Pakistan Peoples Party	Qamar Zaman Kaira	
Punjab	NA-107 (Gujrat-IV)	Pakistan Muslim League (N)	Muhammad Hanif Malik	
Punjab	NA-108 (Mandi Bahauddin-I)	Pakistan Peoples Party	Muhammad Tariq Tarar	
Punjab	NA-109 (Mandi Bahauddin-II)	Pakistan Peoples Party	Nazar Muhammad Gondal	
Punjab	NA-110 (Sialkot-I)	Pakistan Muslim League (N)	Khawaja Muhammad Asif	
Punjab	NA-111 (Sialkot-II)	Pakistan Peoples Party	Firdous Ashiq Awan	
Punjab	NA-112 (Sialkot-III)	Pakistan Muslim League (N)	Rana Abdul Sattar	
Punjab	NA-113 (Sialkot-IV)	Pakistan Muslim League (N)	Sahabzada Syed Murtaza Amin	
Punjab	NA-114 (Sialkot-V)	Pakistan Muslim League (N)	Zahid Hamid	
Punjab	NA-115 (Narowal-I)	Pakistan Muslim League (N)	Sumaira Yasir Rasheed	
Punjab	NA-116 (Narowal-II)	Pakistan Peoples Party	Muhammad Tariq Anis	
Punjab	NA-117 (Narowal-III)	Pakistan Muslim League (N)	Ahsan Iqbal	
Punjab	NA-118 (Lahore-I)	Pakistan Muslim League (N)	Muhammad Riaz Malik	
Punjab	NA-119 (Lahore-II)	Pakistan Muslim League (N)	Hamza Shahbaz Sharif	
Punjab	NA-120 (Lahore-III)	Pakistan Muslim League (N)	Bilal Yasin	
Punjab	NA-121 (Lahore-IV)	Pakistan Muslim League (N)	Mian Marghoob Ahmad	
Punjab	NA-122 (Lahore-V)	Pakistan Muslim League (N)	Sardar Ayaz Sadiq	
Punjab	NA-123 (Lahore-VI)	Pakistan Muslim League (N)	Muhammad Pervaiz Malik	
Punjab	NA-124 (Lahore-VII)	Pakistan Muslim League (N)	Shaikh Rohale Asghar	
Punjab	NA-125 (Lahore-VIII)	Pakistan Muslim League (N)	Khawaja Saad Rafique	
Punjab	NA-126 (Lahore-IX)	Pakistan Muslim League (N)	Omer Sohail Zia Butt	
Punjab	NA-127 (Lahore-X)	Pakistan Muslim League (N)	Naseer Ahmed Bhutta	
Punjab	NA-128 (Lahore-XI)	Pakistan Muslim League (N)	Afzal Khokhar	
Punjab	NA-129 (Lahore-XII)	Pakistan Peoples Party	Tariq Shabbir Khan Mayo	
Punjab	NA-130 (Lahore-XIII)	Pakistan Peoples Party	Samina Khalid Ghurki	
Punjab	NA-131 (Sheikhupura-I)	Pakistan Muslim League (N)	Rana Afzaal Hussain	
Punjab	NA-132 (Sheikhupura-II)	Pakistan Muslim League (N)	Rana Tanveer Hussain	
Punjab	NA-133 (Sheikhupura-III)	Pakistan Muslim League (N)	Mian Javed Latif	
Punjab	NA-134 (Sheikhupura-IV)	Pakistan Muslim League (N)	Irfan Dogar	
Punjab	NA-135 (Sheikhupura-V)	Pakistan Muslim League (N)	Barjees Tahir	
Punjab	NA-136 (Sheikhupura-VI)	Pakistan Muslim League (N)	Choudhry Bilal Ahmed	
Punjab	NA-137 (Sheikhupura-VII)	Independent	Saeed Ahmed Zafar	
Punjab	NA-138 (Kasur-I)	—	Vacant	
Punjab	NA-139 (Kasur-II)	Pakistan Muslim League (N)	Waseem Akhtar Shaikh	
Punjab	NA-140 (Kasur-III)	Independent	Malik Rasheed Ahmed Khan	
Punjab	NA-141 (Kasur-IV)	Pakistan Muslim League (N)	Rana Muhammad Ishaq	
Punjab	NA-142 (Kasur-V)	Pakistan Muslim League (Q)	Sardar Talib Hassan Nakai	
Punjab	NA-143 (Okara-I)	Pakistan Peoples Party	Rai Ghulam Mujtaba Kharral	
Punjab	NA-144 (Okara-II)	Pakistan Peoples Party	Sajjad-ul-Hassan	
Punjab	NA-145 (Okara-III)	Pakistan Peoples Party	Syed Samsam Bukhari	
Punjab	NA-146 (Okara-IV)	Pakistan Peoples Party	Mian Manzoor Ahmad Wattoo	
Punjab	NA-147 (Okara-V)	Pakistan Peoples Party	Khuram Jehangir Wattoo	
Punjab	NA-148 (Multan-I)	Pakistan Peoples Party	Syed Ali Musa Gillani	
Punjab	NA-149 (Multan-II)	Pakistan Muslim League (N)	Sheikh Tariq Rashid	
Punjab	NA-150 (Multan-III)	Pakistan Muslim League (N)	Rana Mahmood-ul-Hassan	
Punjab	NA-151 (Multan-IV)	Pakistan Peoples Party	Abdul Kadir Gillani	
Punjab	NA-152 (Multan-V)	Pakistan Peoples Party	Liaqat Ali Khan	
Punjab	NA-153 (Multan-VI)	Pakistan Muslim League (Q)	Syed Ashiq Hussain Bukhari	
Punjab	NA-154 (Lodhran-I)	Pakistan Muslim League (Q)	Siddique Khan Baloch	
Punjab	NA-155 (Lodhran-II)	Pakistan Muslim League (N)	Muhammad Akhtar Khan Kanju	
Punjab	NA-156 (Khanewal-I)	Pakistan Muslim League (Q)	Mohammad Raza Hayat Harraj	
Punjab	NA-157 (Khanewal-II)	Pakistan Muslim League (Q)	Hamid Yar Hiraj	
Punjab	NA-158 (Khanewal-III)	Pakistan Muslim League (Q)	Pir Aslam Bodla	
Punjab	NA-159 (Khanewal-IV)	Pakistan Peoples Party	Chaudhry Iftikhar Nazir	
Punjab	NA-160 (Sahiwal-I)	Pakistan Muslim League (N)	Syed Imran Ahmed	
Punjab	NA-161 (Sahiwal-II)	Pakistan Peoples Party	Ghulam Farid Kathia	
Punjab	NA-162 (Sahiwal-III)	Pakistan Peoples Party	Chaudhry Zahid Iqbal (Note: Was disqualified. Retained the seat later in by-election.)	
Punjab	NA-163 (Sahiwal-IV)	Pakistan Muslim League (Q)	Nauman Ahmad Langrial	
Punjab	NA-164 (Pakpattan-I)	Pakistan Muslim League (N)	Sardar Mansab Ali Dogar	
Punjab	NA-165 (Pakpattan-II)	Pakistan Muslim League (N)	Muhammad Salman Mohsin Gillani	
Punjab	NA-166 (Pakpattan-III)	Pakistan Muslim League (N)	Rana Zahid Hussain	
Punjab	NA-167 (Vehari-I)	Pakistan Peoples Party	Asghar Ali Jutt	
Punjab	NA-168 (Vehari-II)	Pakistan Peoples Party	Natasha Daultana	
Punjab	NA-169 (Vehari-III)	Pakistan Muslim League (N)	Tehmina Daultana	
Punjab	NA-170 (Vehari-IV)	Pakistan Peoples Party	Mehmood Hayat Khan	
Punjab	NA-171 (D.G.Khan-I)	Pakistan Muslim League (Q)	Khawaja Sheraz Mehmood	
Punjab	NA-172 (D.G.Khan-II)	Pakistan Muslim League (Q)	Awais Leghari	
Punjab	NA-173 (D.G.Khan-III)	Pakistan Muslim League (N)	Muhammad Saif-ud-Din Khosa	
Punjab	NA-174 (Rajanpur-I)	Pakistan Muslim League (Q)	Sardar Muhammad Jaffar Khan Leghari	
Punjab	NA-175 (Rajanpur-II)	Pakistan Peoples Party	Dost Muhammad Mazari	
Punjab	NA-176 (Muzaffargarh-I)	Pakistan Peoples Party	Muhammad Mohsin Ali Qureshi	
Punjab	NA-177 (Muzaffargarh-II)	Pakistan Peoples Party	Hina Rabbani Khar	
Punjab	NA-178 (Muzaffargarh-III)	Pakistan Peoples Party	Jamshed Dasti	
Punjab	NA-179 (Muzaffargarh-IV)	Pakistan Peoples Party	Muhammad Moazam Ali Khan Jatoi	
Punjab	NA-180 (Muzaffargarh-V)	Pakistan Peoples Party	Abdul Qayyum Khan Jatoi	
Punjab	NA-181 (Layyah-I)	Pakistan Muslim League (Q)	Sardar Bahadur Ahmed Khan	
Punjab	NA-182 (Layyah-II)	Pakistan Muslim League (N)	Syed Muhammad Saqlain	
Punjab	NA-183 (Bhawalpur-I)	Pakistan Peoples Party	Arif Aziz Sheikh	
Punjab	NA-184 (Bahawalpur-II)	Pakistan Peoples Party	Khadija Aamir Yar Malik	
Punjab	NA-185 (Bahawalpur-III)	Pakistan Muslim League (N)	Muhammad Baligh Ur Rehman	
Punjab	NA-186 (Bahawalpur-IV)	Pakistan Muslim League (Q)	Riaz Hussain Pirzada	
Punjab	NA-187 (Bahawalpur-V)	Pakistan Muslim League (N)	Chaudhry Saud Majeed	
Punjab	NA-188 (Bahawalnager-I)	Pakistan Muslim League (Q)	Khadim Hussain Wattoo	
Punjab	NA-189 (Bahawalnager-II)	Pakistan Peoples Party	Syed Mumtaz Alam Gillani	
Punjab	NA-190 (Bahawalnagar-III)	Pakistan Peoples Party	Abdul Ghafoor Chaudhry	
Punjab	NA-191 (Bahawalnagar-IV)	—	Vacant	
Punjab	NA-192 (Rahim Yar Khan-I)	Pakistan Peoples Party	Hamid Saeed Kazmi	
Punjab	NA-193 (Rahim Yar Khan-II)	Pakistan Peoples Party	Mian Abdul Sattar	
Punjab	NA-194 (Rahim Yar Khan-III)	Pakistan Peoples Party	Makhdoom Shahabuddin	
Punjab	NA-195 (Rahim Yar Khan-IV)	Pakistan Muslim League (F)	Mustafa Mehmood	
Punjab	NA-196 (Rahim Yar Khan-V)	Pakistan Peoples Party	Javed Iqbal Warraich	
Punjab	NA-197 (Rahim Yar Khan-VI)	Pakistan Muslim League (N)	Arshad Khan Leghari	
Sindh	NA-198 (Sukkur-I)	Pakistan Peoples Party	Nauman Islam Shaikh	
Sindh	NA-199 (Sukkur-II)	Pakistan Peoples Party	Syed Khurshid Ahmed Shah	
Sindh	NA-200 (Ghotki-I)	Pakistan Peoples Party	Mian Abdul Haq	
Sindh	NA-201 (Ghotki-II)	Independent	Ali Mohammad Mahar	
Sindh	NA-202 (Shikarpur-I)	Pakistan Peoples Party	Aftab Shaban Mirani	
Sindh	NA-203 (Shikarpur-II)	Pakistan Muslim League (Q)	Ghous Bux Khan Mahar	
Sindh	NA-204 (Larkana-I)	Pakistan Peoples Party	Shahid Hussain Bhutto	
Sindh	NA-205 (Larkana-II)	Pakistan Peoples Party	Nazir Ahmed Bughio	
Sindh	NA-206 (Larkana-III)	Pakistan Peoples Party	Mir Aamir Ali Khan Magsi	
Sindh	NA-207 (Larkana-IV)	Pakistan Peoples Party	Faryal Talpur	
Sindh	NA-208 (Jacobabad-I)	Pakistan Peoples Party	Aijaz Hussain Jakhrani	
Sindh	NA-209 (Jacobabad-II)	Pakistan Peoples Party	Hazar Khan Bijarani	
Sindh	NA-210 (Jacobabad-III)	Pakistan Peoples Party	Gul Muhammad Khan Jakhrani	
Sindh	NA-211 (Naushero Feroze-I)	National Peoples Party (Pakistan)	Ghulam Murtaza Khan Jatoi	
Sindh	NA-212 (Naushero Feroze-II)	Pakistan Peoples Party	Syed Zafar Ali Shah	
Sindh	NA-213 (Nawabshah-I)	Pakistan Peoples Party	Azra Fazal Pechuho	
Sindh	NA-214 (Nawabshah-II)	Pakistan Peoples Party	Syed Gulam Mustafa Shah	
Sindh	NA-215 (Khairpur-I)	Pakistan Peoples Party	Nawab Ali Wassan	
Sindh	NA-216 (Khairpur-II)	Pakistan Muslim League (F)	Pir Sadaruddin Shah	
Sindh	NA-217 (Khairpur-III)	Pakistan Peoples Party	Fazal Ali Shah	
Sindh	NA-218 (Hyderabad-I)	Pakistan Peoples Party	Ameen Faheem	
Sindh	NA-219 (Hyderabad-II)	—	Vacant	
Sindh	NA-220 (Hyderabad-III)	Muttahida Qaumi Movement	Salah-ud-Din	
Sindh	NA-221 (Hyderabad-IV)	Pakistan Peoples Party	Syed Amir Ali Shah Jamote	
Sindh	NA-222 (Hyderabad-V)	Pakistan Peoples Party	Syed Naveed Qamar	
Sindh	NA-223 (Hyderabad-VI)	Pakistan Peoples Party	Shamshad Sattar Bachani	
Sindh	NA-224 (Badin-I)	Pakistan Peoples Party	Ghulam Ali Nizamani	
Sindh	NA-225 (Badin-II)	Pakistan Peoples Party	Fehmida Mirza	
Sindh	NA-226 (Mirpurkhas-I)	Pakistan Peoples Party	Aftab Hussain Shah Jillani	
Sindh	NA-227 (Mirpurkhas-II)	Pakistan Peoples Party	Mir Munawar Ali	
Sindh	NA-228 (Mirpurkhas-III)	Pakistan Peoples Party	Nawab Muhammad Yousuf	
Sindh	NA-229 (Tharparkar-I)	Pakistan Muslim League (Q)	Arbab Zakaullah	
Sindh	NA-230 (Tharparkar-II)	Pakistan Muslim League (Q)	Ghulam Hyder Samejo	
Sindh	NA-231 (Dadu-I)	Pakistan Peoples Party	Abdul Ghani Talpur	
Sindh	NA-232 (Dadu-II)	Pakistan Peoples Party	Rafiq Ahmed Jamali	
Sindh	NA-233 (Dadu-III)	Pakistan Peoples Party	Talat Mahesar	
Sindh	NA-234 (Sanghar-I)	Pakistan Muslim League (F)	Muhammad Jadam Mangrio	
Sindh	NA-235 (Sanghar-II)	Pakistan Muslim League (F)	Haji Khuda Bux Rajar	
Sindh	NA-236 (Sanghar-III)	Pakistan Peoples Party	Roshan Din Junejo	
Sindh	NA-237 (Thatta-I)	Pakistan Peoples Party	Abdul Wahid Soomro	
Sindh	NA-238 (Thatta-II)	Pakistan Muslim League (Q)	Syed Ayaz Ali Shah Sheerazi	
Sindh	NA-239 (Karachi-I)	Pakistan Peoples Party	Abdul Qadir Patel	
Sindh	NA-240 (Karachi-II)	Muttahida Qaumi Movement	Khuwaja Sohail Mansoor	
Sindh	NA-241 (Karachi-III)	Muttahida Qaumi Movement	Iqbal Qadri	
Sindh	NA-242 (Karachi-IV)	Muttahida Qaumi Movement	Abdul Kadir Khanzada	
Sindh	NA-243 (Karachi-V)	Muttahida Qaumi Movement	Abdul Waseem	
Sindh	NA-244 (Karachi-VI)	Muttahida Qaumi Movement	Sheikh Salah-ud-Din	
Sindh	NA-245 (Karachi-VII)	Muttahida Qaumi Movement	Muhammad Rehan Hashmi	
Sindh	NA-246 (Karachi-VIII)	Muttahida Qaumi Movement	Sufiyan Yousuf	
Sindh	NA-247 (Karachi-IX)	—	Vacant	
Sindh	NA-248 (Karachi-X)	Pakistan Peoples Party	Nabil Gabol	
Sindh	NA-249 (Karachi-XI)	Muttahida Qaumi Movement	Farooq Sattar	
Sindh	NA-250 (Karachi-XII)	Muttahida Qaumi Movement	Khushbakht Shujaat	
Sindh	NA-251 (Karachi-XIII)	Muttahida Qaumi Movement	Waseem Akhtar	
Sindh	NA-252 (Karachi-XIV)	Muttahida Qaumi Movement	Abdul Rashid Godil	
Sindh	NA-253 (Karachi-XV)	—	Vacant	
Sindh	NA-254 (Karachi-XVI)	Muttahida Qaumi Movement	Muhammad Ayub Sheikh	
Sindh	NA-255 (Karachi-XVII)	Muttahida Qaumi Movement	Syed Asif Husnain	
Sindh	NA-256 (Karachi-XVIII)	Muttahida Qaumi Movement	Iqbal Muhammad Ali Khan	
Sindh	NA-257 (Karachi-XIX)	Muttahida Qaumi Movement	Sajid Ahmed	
Sindh	NA-258 (Karachi-XX)	Pakistan Peoples Party	Sher Muhammad Baloch	
Balochistan	NA-259 (Quetta)	Pakistan Peoples Party	Syed Nasir Ali Shah	
Balochistan	NA-260 (Quetta-Chagai-Mastung)	Pakistan Peoples Party	Sardar Al-Haj Mohammad Umar	
Balochistan	NA-261 (Pishin-Ziarat)	Muttahida Majlis-e-Amal	Moulvi Agha Muhammad	
Balochistan	NA-262 (Killa Abdullah)	Muttahida Majlis-e-Amal	Haji Roz-ud-Din	
Balochistan	NA-263 (Loralai)	Pakistan Muslim League (N)	Sardar Muhammad Yaqoob Khan (Note: Was disqualified. Retained the seat later in by-election.)	
Balochistan	NA-264 (Zhob-Killa Saifullah)	Independent	Maulvi Asmatullah	
Balochistan	NA-265 (Sibi-Kohlu-Dera Bugti)	Pakistan Muslim League (Q)	Mir Ahmadan Khan Bugti	
Balochistan	NA-266 (Nasirabad)	Pakistan Peoples Party	Mir Changez Khan Jamali	
Balochistan	NA-267 (Kachhi)	Pakistan Peoples Party	Mir Humayun Aziz Kurd	
Balochistan	NA-268 (Kalat-Mastung)	Pakistan Peoples Party	Ayatullah Durrani	
Balochistan	NA-269 (Khuzdar)	Independent	Mohammad Usman	
Balochistan	NA-270 (Awaran-Lasbela)	—	Vacant	
Balochistan	NA-271 (Kharan-Panjgur)	Pakistan Muslim League (N)	Abdul Qadir Baloch	
Balochistan	NA-272 (Kech-Gwadar)	Balochistan National Party Awami	Yaqoob Bizanjo	
Indirectly elected on reserved seats
Balochistan	Reserved seats for women	Muttahida Majlis-e-Amal	Aasiya Nasir	
Balochistan	Reserved seats for women	Pakistan Peoples Party	Zil-e-Huma	
Balochistan	Reserved seats for women	Pakistan Muslim League (Q)	Zubaida Jalal	
Khyber Pakhtunkhwa	Reserved seats for women	Pakistan Peoples Party	Asma Arbab Alamgir	
Khyber Pakhtunkhwa	Reserved seats for women	Awami National Party	Bushra Gohar	
Khyber Pakhtunkhwa	Reserved seats for women	Pakistan Peoples Party	Farhat Khan	
Khyber Pakhtunkhwa	Reserved seats for women	Pakistan Muslim League (Q)	Farzana Mushtaq Ghani	
Khyber Pakhtunkhwa	Reserved seats for women	Pakistan Muslim League (N)	Imtiaz Sultan Bukhari	
Khyber Pakhtunkhwa	Reserved seats for women	Awami National Party	Jamila Gilani	
Khyber Pakhtunkhwa	Reserved seats for women	Awami National Party	Khurshid Begum Saeed	
Punjab	Reserved seats for women	Pakistan Peoples Party	Fouzia Habib	
Punjab	Reserved seats for women	Pakistan Peoples Party	Palwasha Khan	
Punjab	Reserved seats for women	Pakistan Muslim League (N)	Anusha Rahman	
Punjab	Reserved seats for women	Pakistan Muslim League (Q)	Attiya Inayatullah	
Punjab	Reserved seats for women	Pakistan Peoples Party	Nasim Akhtar Chaudhry	
Punjab	Reserved seats for women	Pakistan Peoples Party	Belum Hasnain	
Punjab	Reserved seats for women	Pakistan Muslim League (Q)	Bushra Rahman	
Punjab	Reserved seats for women	Pakistan Muslim League (Q)	Donya Aziz	
Punjab	Reserved seats for women	Pakistan Peoples Party	Fakhar-un-Nisa	
Punjab	Reserved seats for women	Pakistan Peoples Party	Farzana Raja	
Punjab	Reserved seats for women	Pakistan Muslim League (N)	Begum Ishrat Ashraf	
Punjab	Reserved seats for women	Pakistan Muslim League (Q)	Kashmala Tariq	
Punjab	Reserved seats for women	Pakistan Muslim League (N)	Khalida Mansoor	
Punjab	Reserved seats for women	Pakistan Peoples Party	Mehreen Anwar Raja	
Punjab	Reserved seats for women	Pakistan Muslim League (N)	Nighat Parveen	
Punjab	Reserved seats for women	Pakistan Muslim League (N)	Nisar Tanveer	
Punjab	Reserved seats for women	Pakistan Muslim League (Q)	Nosheen Saeed	
Punjab	Reserved seats for women	Pakistan Muslim League (N)	Parveen Masood Bhatti	
Punjab	Reserved seats for women	Pakistan Muslim League (N)	Qudsia Arshad	
Punjab	Reserved seats for women	Pakistan Peoples Party	Rukhsana Bangash	
Punjab	Reserved seats for women	Pakistan Muslim League (Q)	Rukhsana Jamshed Buttar	
Punjab	Reserved seats for women	Pakistan Peoples Party	Samina Mushtaq	
Punjab	Reserved seats for women	Pakistan Muslim League (N)	Seema Mohiuddin Jameeli	
Punjab	Reserved seats for women	Pakistan Muslim League (N)	Shaheen Ashfaq	
Punjab	Reserved seats for women	Pakistan Muslim League (N)	Shaheen Shafiq	
Punjab	Reserved seats for women	Pakistan Muslim League (N)	Shahnaz Saleem Malik	
Punjab	Reserved seats for women	Pakistan Peoples Party	Shahnaz Wazir Ali	
Punjab	Reserved seats for women	Pakistan Peoples Party	Shakeela Khanam Rashid	
Punjab	Reserved seats for women	Pakistan Muslim League (N)	Shireen Arshad Khan	
Punjab	Reserved seats for women	Pakistan Muslim League (N)	Surriya Ashgar	
Punjab	Reserved seats for women	Pakistan Muslim League (N)	Tahira Aurangzeb	
Punjab	Reserved seats for women	Pakistan Muslim League (Q)	Tanzila Aamir Cheema	
Punjab	Reserved seats for women	Pakistan Muslim League (N)	Tasneem Siddiqui	
Punjab	Reserved seats for women	Pakistan Peoples Party	Yasmeen Rehman	
Sindh	Reserved seats for women	Pakistan Muslim League (Q)	Fiza Junejo	
Sindh	Reserved seats for women	Muttahida Qaumi Movement	Imrana Saeed Jamil	
Sindh	Reserved seats for women	Muttahida Qaumi Movement	Kishwer Zehra	
Sindh	Reserved seats for women	Pakistan Peoples Party	Mahreen Razaque Bhutto	
Sindh	Reserved seats for women	Pakistan Peoples Party	Munira Shakir	
Sindh	Reserved seats for women	Pakistan Peoples Party	Nafisa Shah	
Sindh	Reserved seats for women	Muttahida Qaumi Movement	Nahid Shahid Ali	
Sindh	Reserved seats for women	Pakistan Muslim League (F)	Reena Kumari	
Sindh	Reserved seats for women	Pakistan Peoples Party	Rubina Saadat Qaim Khani	
Sindh	Reserved seats for women	Pakistan Peoples Party	Shagufta Jumani	
Sindh	Reserved seats for women	Muttahida Qaumi Movement	Shagufta Sadiq	
Sindh	Reserved seats for women	Pakistan Peoples Party	Shazia Marri	
Sindh	Reserved seats for women	Pakistan Peoples Party	Suraiya Jatoi	
National	Reserved seats for minorities	Pakistan Muslim League (Q)	Akram Masih Gill	
National	Reserved seats for minorities	Pakistan Muslim League (N)	Bhawan Das	
National	Reserved seats for minorities	Pakistan Muslim League (N)	Darshan Punshi	
National	Reserved seats for minorities	Pakistan Peoples Party	Khatu Mal Jeewan	
National	Reserved seats for minorities	Pakistan Muslim League (Q)	Kishan Chand Parwani	
National	Reserved seats for minorities	Pakistan Peoples Party	Lal Chand	
National	Reserved seats for minorities	Pakistan Peoples Party	Mahesh Kumar	
National	Reserved seats for minorities	Muttahida Qaumi Movement	Manwer Lal	
National	Reserved seats for minorities	Pakistan Muslim League (N)	Nelson Azeem	
National	Reserved seats for minorities	Pakistan Peoples Party	Ramesh Lal	

== Former members ==
Region	Constituency	Incumbent elected in 2008 general elections for the 13th National Assembly			Ref
Region	Constituency	Political party	Member	Notes	Ref
Khyber Pakhtunkhwa	Constituency NA-9	Awami National Party	Muhammad Khan Hoti	Resigned, quit ANP to join PTI	
Khyber Pakhtunkhwa	Constituency NA-11	Pakistan Peoples Party	Abdul Akbar Khan	Resigned to retain the seat won in the Provincial Assembly of Khyber Pakhtunkhwa	
Khyber Pakhtunkhwa	Constituency NA-21	Pakistan Muslim League (N)	Faiz Muhammad Khan	Died	
Khyber Pakhtunkhwa	Constituency NA-28	Awami National Party	Abdul Matin Khan	Died	
FATA	Constituency NA-43	Independent	Shaukatullah Khan	Resigned to become Governor of Khyber Pakhtunkhwa	
Punjab	Constituency NA-61	Independent	Muhammad Faiz Tamman	Disqualified, fake degree	
Punjab	Constituency NA-68	Pakistan Muslim League (N)	Syed Javed Hassnain Shah	Disqualified, fake degree	
Punjab	Constituency NA-69	Pakistan Muslim League (Q)	Sumaira Malik	Disqualified, fake degree	
Punjab	Constituency NA-100	Independent	Mudassar Qayyum Nahra	Disqualified, fake degree	
Punjab	Constituency NA-107	Pakistan Muslim League (N)	Muhammad Jamil Malik	Disqualified, dual nationality	
Punjab	Constituency NA-138	Pakistan Muslim League (N)	Mazhar Hayat Khan	Disqualified, fake degree	
Punjab	Constituency NA-140	Pakistan Peoples Party	Aseff Ahmad Ali	Resigned, quit PPP to join PTI	
Punjab	Constituency NA-148	Pakistan Peoples Party	Shah Mehmood Qureshi	Resigned, quit PPP to join PTI	
Punjab	Constituency NA-149	Pakistan Muslim League (N)	Javed Hashmi	Resigned, quit PML (N) to join PTI	
Punjab	Constituency NA-151	Pakistan Peoples Party	Yousaf Raza Gillani	Disqualified for contempt of court (Prime Minister)	
Punjab	Constituency NA-155	Pakistan Peoples Party	Hayatullah Khan Tareen	Disqualified, fake degree	
Punjab	Constituency NA-168	Pakistan Peoples Party	Azeem Daultana	Died	
Punjab	Constituency NA-167	Pakistan Muslim League (Q)	Ch. Nazir Ahmed Jatt	Disqualified, fake degree	
Punjab	Constituency NA-172	Pakistan Muslim League (Q)	Farooq Leghari	Died	
Punjab	Constituency NA-191	Pakistan Peoples Party	Muhammad Afzal Sindhu	Resigned, left PPP to join PTI	
Punjab	Constituency NA-195	Pakistan Muslim League (F)	Jehangir Khan Tareen	Resigned, left PML-F to join PTI	
Sindh	Constituency NA-210	Pakistan Muslim League (Q)	Mir Nasrullah Khan Bijarani	Died	
Sindh	Constituency NA-219	Muttahida Qaumi Movement	Tayyab Hussain	Disqualified, dual nationality	
Sindh	Constituency NA-235	Pakistan Muslim League (F)	Ghulam Dastagir Rajar	Disqualified, fake degree	
Sindh	Constituency NA-245	Muttahida Qaumi Movement	Farhat Mohammad Khan	Disqualified, dual nationality	
Sindh	Constituency NA-247	Muttahida Qaumi Movement	Nadeem Ehsan	Disqualified, dual nationality	
Sindh	Constituency NA-253	Muttahida Qaumi Movement	Haidar Abbas Rizvi	Disqualified, dual nationality	
Balochistan	Constituency NA-263	Pakistan Muslim League (Q)	Muhammad Israr Tareen	Ineligible, voting irregularities.	
Balochistan	Constituency NA-266	Pakistan Muslim League (N)	Taj Muhammad Jamali	Died	
Balochistan	Constituency NA-270	Pakistan Muslim League (Q)	Jam Mohammad Yousaf	Died	
Khyber Pakhtunkhwa	Reserved seats for women	Pakistan Peoples Party	Malik Mehr un Nisa Afridi	Died	
Punjab	Reserved seats for women	Pakistan Muslim League (N)	Mamoona Hashmi	Resigned, quit PML (N) to join PTI	
Punjab	Reserved seats for women	Pakistan Muslim League (Q)	Marvi Memon	Resigned, quit PML (Q) to join PML (N)	
Punjab	Reserved seats for women	Pakistan Muslim League (N)	Nuzhat Sadiq	Resigned to elect as a Senator	
Punjab	Reserved seats for women	Pakistan Muslim League (N)	Sabeen Rizvi	Disqualified, dual nationality	
Punjab	Reserved seats for women	Pakistan Muslim League (Q)	Shehnaz Sheikh	Disqualified, dual nationality	
Sindh	Reserved seats for women	Pakistan Peoples Party	Farahnaz Ispahani	Disqualified, dual nationality	
Sindh	Reserved seats for women	Pakistan Peoples Party	Fauzia Wahab	Died	
Sindh	Reserved seats for women	Muttahida Qaumi Movement	Fouzia Ejaz Khan	Disqualified, dual nationality	
Sindh	Reserved seats for women	Pakistan Peoples Party	Sherry Rehman	Resigned to be appointed as Pakistan Ambassador to the United States	
Khyber Pakhtunkhwa	Reserved seats for minorities	Pakistan Muslim League (N)	Araish Kumar	Disqualified, dual nationality	

== See also ==
- List of members of the 1st National Assembly of Pakistan
- List of members of the 2nd National Assembly of Pakistan
- List of members of the 3rd National Assembly of Pakistan
- List of members of the 4th National Assembly of Pakistan
- List of members of the 5th National Assembly of Pakistan
- List of members of the 6th National Assembly of Pakistan
- List of members of the 7th National Assembly of Pakistan
- List of members of the 8th National Assembly of Pakistan
- List of members of the 9th National Assembly of Pakistan
- List of members of the 10th National Assembly of Pakistan
- List of members of the 11th National Assembly of Pakistan
- List of members of the 12th National Assembly of Pakistan
- List of members of the 13th National Assembly of Pakistan
- List of members of the 14th National Assembly of Pakistan
- List of members of the 15th National Assembly of Pakistan
