= Agha Muhammad (politician) =

Pakistani politician

Moulvi Agha Muhammad

Member of the National Assembly of Pakistan
- In office 17 March 2008 – 31 May 2018
- Constituency: NA-261 (Pishin-cum-Ziarat)

Personal details
- Born: 1 January 1944 (age 82)
- Party: Jamiat Ulema-e-Islam (F)

Moulvi Agha Muhammad (Urdu: مولوی آغا محمد; born 1 January 1944) is a Pakistani politician who had been a member of the National Assembly of Pakistan, from 2008 to May 2018.

== Early life ==
He was born on 1 January 1944.

== Political career ==
He was elected to the National Assembly of Pakistan as a candidate of Muttahida Majlis-e-Amal (MMA) from Constituency NA-261 (Pishin-cum-Ziarat) in the 2008 Pakistani general election. He received 30,611 votes and defeated Muhammad Sarwar Khan.

He was re-elected to the National Assembly as a candidate of Jamiat Ulema-e-Islam (F) (JUI-F) from Constituency NA-261 (Pishin-cum-Ziarat) in the 2013 Pakistani general election. He received 48,712 votes and defeated Muhammad Essa Roshan, a candidate of Pashtunkhwa Milli Awami Party (PKMAP). In the same election, he ran for the seat of the National Assembly as an independent candidate from Constituency NA-263 (Loralai-cum-Musakhel-cum-Barkhan) but was unsuccessful. He received 152 votes and lost the seat to Ameer Zaman.

In 2014, he was disqualified as the member of National Assembly and re-election in the constituency was ordered. His National Assembly membership was later reinstated by The Supreme Court of Pakistan.

== See also ==
- List of Deobandis
