= Shahnaz =

Shahnaz (Persian: شهناز) is a given name and surname of Persian origin. The name is made from شاه (Shah, "king"), and ناز (naz, "pride"), making it mean "pride of the king". The name may also appear using alternate spellings, such as Shanaz, Shehnaz, Shahnaze or Shenaz. This name has no link to Islam, but is culturally used by many Muslims especially in South Asia (Pakistan, India, Afghanistan, Bangladesh). It also is occasionally used by some Arabs. It is similar to Shahrnaz, a name mentioned for Shahrbanu, the wife of Imam Hussain.

Chanez, is the popular variant of Shahnaz in Maghreb especially Algeria and other non-maghreban countries like France.

Notable people with the name include:

== Given name ==
Listed alphabetically by surname

=== Acting ===
- Shehnaz Gill (born 1993), Indian actress
- Shehnaz Pervaiz (born 1968), Pakistani actress
- Shehnaz Sheikh (born 1962), Pakistani actress
- Shenaz Treasury (born 1981), Indian actress

=== Politics ===
- Shanaz Ibrahim Ahmed (born 1954), Kurdish-Iraqi politician and writer
- Shahnaz Wazir Ali, Pakistani politician
- Shahnaz Ansari (1970–2020), Pakistani politician
- Shahnaz Naseer Baloch, Pakistani politician
- Shahnaz Himmeti (1978–2013), Afghan politician
- Shahnaz Saleem Malik (born 1956), Pakistani politician
- Shahnaz Rahman (died 2023), Nepalese politician
- Shahnaz Sardar, Bangladeshi politician
- Shehnaz Sheikh (politician), Pakistani-Australian politician

=== Sports ===
- Shahnaz Jafarizadeh (born 1994), Iranian footballer
- Shahnaz Jebreen (born 1992), Jordanian footballer
- Shahnaz Parvin Maleka, Bangladeshi Kabaddi player
- Shahnaz Sheikh (born 1949), Pakistani field hockey player
- Shahnaz Sohail, Pakistani cricketer

=== Writing ===
- Shahnaz Azad (1901–1961), Iranian journalist and a pioneer of the women's movement in Iran
- Shahnaz Bashir, Indian novelist
- Shahnaz Habib, Indian writer and translator
- Shahnaz Munni (born 1969), Bangladeshi journalist, poet and writer
- Shenaz Patel (born 1966), Indo-Mauritian writer

=== Other ===
- Shahnaz Ali (born 1961), Pakistani-born British activist
- Shahnaz Bukhari, Pakistani clinical psychologist and activist
- Shanaz Gulzar, British visual artist
- Shahnaz Gul (1944–2010), Pakistani socialite
- Shahnaz Husain (born 1944), Indian entrepreneur
- Shahnaz Laghari, Pakistani pilot
- Shahnaz Pahlavi (born 1940), Iranian princess
- Shahnaz Rahmatullah (1942–2019), Bangladeshi singer

== Surname ==
Listed alphabetically by given name

- Durreen Shahnaz (born 1968), Bangladeshi-American entrepreneur, professor, and speaker
- Jalil Shahnaz (1921–2013), Persian classical music musician
- Zeba Shehnaz (born 1952), Pakistani actress and comedian

== Mononym ==
- Shahnaz (actress), Bangladeshi film actress

== See also ==
- Shahnaz street, a street in Tabriz, Iran
