= Nisar =

Nisar or Nesar is a masculine given name of Arabic origin which means to sacrifice oneself; the word 'Nisar' itself means 'one who sacrifices oneself'. Notable people with the name include:

== Given name ==
=== Nesar ===
- Nesar Ahmed (born 1952), Bangladesh politician
- Nesar Ahmad Bahave (born 1984), Afghan Taekwondo practitioner

=== Nesaruddin ===
- Nesaruddin Ahmad (1873–1952), Bengali Islamic scholar

=== Nisar ===
- Nissar (director) (1960–2025), Indian film director
- Nisar Afridi (born 1999), Pakistani cricketer
- Nisar Ahmad (cricketer) (born 1995), Pakistani cricketer
- Nisar Ahmad Ahmadi (died 2023), Afghan politician
- Nisar Ahmed (footballer) (born 1943), Pakistani footballer
- Nisar Baaz, Pakistani politician
- Nisar Bazmi (1924–2007), Pakistani composer and music director
- Nisar Ahmed Cheema, Pakistani politician
- Nisar Ahmed Faruqi (1934–2004), Indian scholar on Sufism
- Nisar Fatima (1935–1991), Pakistani politician and religious scholar
- Nisar Gul, Pakistani politician
- Nisar Hossain (born 1961), Bangladeshi academic
- Nisar Ahmad Jutt (born 1975), Pakistani politician and agriculturalist
- Nisar Ahmad Kakru (born 1949), Indian judge
- Nisar Khan (born 1954), Pakistani politician
- Nisar Khan (boxer) (born 1982), Pakistani boxer
- Nisar Akbar Khan (1942–2024), Pakistani politician and army officer
- Nisar Hussain Khan (1906–1993), Indian classical vocalist
- Nisar Muhammad Khan (1942–2018), Pakistani playwright, scriptwriter, and broadcaster
- Nisar Khuhro (born 1950), Pakistani politician
- Nisar Memon (born 1942), Pakistani politician
- Nisar Mohmand, Pakistani politician
- Nisar Muhammad, Pakistani politician
- Nisar Nasik (1939–2019), Pakistani poet
- Nisar Ahmad Nusrat (died 2024), Afghan Taliban politician
- Nisar Ahmed Panhwar (born 1966), Pakistani politician
- Nisar Qadri (1940–2023), Pakistani radio, stage, and television actor
- Nisar Rahmath, Indian costume designer
- Nisar Ahmed Siddiqui (died 2020), Pakistani academic and educationist
- Nisar Smiler (born 1951), British Pakistani martial artist, actor, and radio presenter
- Nisar Tanveer, Pakistani politician
- Nisar Wahdat (born 1999), Afghan cricketer
- Nisar Muhammad Yousafzai (1897–1937), Afghan war hero
- Jan Nisar Akhtar (1914–1976), Indian poet and Bollywood lyricist
- K. S. Nissar Ahmed (1936–2020), Indian poet and writer in Kannada

== Surname ==
- Hassan Nisar (born 1951), Pakistani columnist and analyst
- Mohammad Nisar, Pakistani cricketer
- Mohammad Nissar (1910–1963), Indian cricketer
- Muhammad Nisar (born 1985), Pakistani kabaddi player

== Other uses ==
- NISAR (satellite), Nasa-Isro Synthetic Aperture Radar (NISAR), a joint space venture between India and USA

== See also ==
- Nassar
