= Reena Kumari =

Reena Kumari may refer to:

- Reena Kumari (archer)
- Reena Kumari (politician)
