= Kamal Uddin =

Pakistani politician

Kamaluddin

Member of the National Assembly of Pakistan
- In office 13 August 2018 – 10 August 2023
- Constituency: NA-262 (Pishin)

Personal details
- Party: PTI (2025-present)
- Other political affiliations: JUI (F) (2018-2025)

Kamal Uddin (also spelled Kamaluddin) is a Pakistani politician who had been a member of the National Assembly of Pakistan from August 2018 till August 2023.

== Political career ==
He was elected to the National Assembly of Pakistan as a candidate of Muttahida Majlis-e-Amal from NA-262 (Pishin) in the 2018 Pakistani general election. He received 50,258 votes and defeated Muhammad Essa Khan, a candidate of Pashtunkhwa Milli Awami Party.
