= Muhammad Arif Chaudhry =

Pakistani politician

- محمد عارف چوہدری

Member of the National Assembly of Pakistan
- In office 1 June 2013 – 2015
- Constituency: NA-144 (Okara-II)

Personal details
- Born: 1 January 1959 (age 67)
- Party: Pakistan Muslim League (N)

Muhammad Arif Chaudhry (Urdu: محمد عارف چوہدری; born 1 January 1959) is a Pakistani politician who had been a member of the National Assembly of Pakistan from June 2013 to 2015.

== Early life ==
He was born on 1 January 1959 in Arain family.

== Political career ==
He was elected to the National Assembly of Pakistan as a candidate of Pakistan Muslim League (N) (PML-N) from Constituency NA-144 (Okara-II) in the 2013 Pakistani general election. He received 105,162 votes and defeated Shafeeqa Baghum Rao Sikindar Iqbal, a candidate of Pakistan Peoples Party (PPP).

In 2015, he was denotified as member of the National Assembly after he was disqualified to continue in office because of fake degree case.
