= Sajjad-ul-Hassan =

Pakistani politician

Member of the National Assembly of Pakistan
- In office 2008–2013
- Constituency: Constituency NA-144 (Okara-II)

Personal details
- Born: October 26, 1964 (age 61)

Chaudhry Sajjad-ul-Hassan is a Pakistani politician who has been a member of the National Assembly of Pakistan from 2008 to 2013. Sajjad ul Hassan is PPPP District President of Okara Area. He is Arain By Cast.

== Political career ==
He was elected to the National Assembly of Pakistan from Constituency NA-144 (Okara-II) as an independent candidate in the 2008 Pakistani general election and later joined Pakistan Peoples Party (PPP). He received 77,795 votes and defeated Rao Sikandar Iqbal.

He ran for the seat of the National Assembly from Constituency NA-144 (Okara-II) as a candidate of PPP in by-polls held in October 2015, but was unsuccessful. He received 4,300 votes and lost the seat to Chaudhry Riaz-ul-Haq.

He is currently District President of PPP in Okara.
