= Muhammad Moeen Wattoo =

Pakistani politician

- محمد معین وٹو

Ministry of Water Resources (Pakistan)
- Incumbent
- Assumed office 7 March 2025
- President: Asif Ali Zardari
- Prime Minister: Shehbaz Sharif

Member of the National Assembly of Pakistan
- Incumbent
- Assumed office 29 February 2024
- Constituency: NA-138 Okara-IV
- In office 13 August 2018 – 10 August 2023
- Constituency: NA-144 (Okara-IV)
- In office 1 June 2013 – 31 May 2018
- Constituency: NA-147 (Okara-V)

Personal details
- Born: 15 September 1955 (age 71) Okara, Punjab, Pakistan
- Party: PMLN (2008-present)

Muhammad Moeen Wattoo (Urdu: محمد معین وٹو; born 15 September 1955) is a Pakistani politician who has been a member of the National Assembly of Pakistan since February 2024 and previously served in this position from August 2018 till August 2023 and from June 2013 to May 2018. He was a member of the Provincial Assembly of Punjab from 2008 to 2013.

== Early life ==
He was born on 15 September 1955.

== Political career ==
He ran for the seat of the National Assembly of Pakistan as a candidate of Pakistan Muslim League (Q) (PML-Q) from Constituency NA-147 (Okara-V) in the 2002 Pakistani general election but was unsuccessful. He received 50,040 votes and lost the seat to Robina Shaheen Wattoo, a candidate of Pakistan Muslim League (J).

He was elected to the Provincial Assembly of Punjab as an independent candidate from Constituency PP-193 (Okara-IX) in the 2008 Pakistani general election. He received 41,498 votes and defeated Dewan Akhlaq Ahmad, a candidate of PML-Q. Following his successful election, he joined Pakistan Muslim League (N) (PML-N) in February 2008.

He was elected to the National Assembly as a candidate of PML-N from Constituency NA-147 (Okara-V) in the 2013 Pakistani general election. He received 87,266 votes and defeated Manzoor Wattoo. In the same election, Wattoo was also elected to the Provincial Assembly of Punjab as a candidate of PML-N from Constituency PP-193 (Okara-IX). He received 30,137 votes and defeated an independent candidate, Dewan Ikhlaq Ahmad. Wattoo vacated the Punjab Assembly seat.

He was re-elected to the National Assembly as a candidate of PML-N from Constituency NA-144 (Okara-IV) in the 2018 Pakistani general election.

He was re-elected to the National Assembly as a candidate of PMLN from NA-138 Okara-IV in the 2024 Pakistani general election. He received 122,775 votes and defeated Manzoor Wattoo, an PPP candidate.
