= Zil-e-Huma (disambiguation) =

Zil-e-Huma or Zill-e-Huma (Urdu: ظلِ ہما) may also refer to:

- Zil-e-Huma, Pakistani singer
- Zil-e-Huma (Balochistan politician), Pakistani MNA from Balochistan
- Zill-e-Huma (Punjab politician) (born 1977), Pakistani MPA from the Punjab
- Zill-e-Huma (Khyber Pakhtunkhwa politician), Pakistani MNA from Khyber Pakhtunkhwa
- Zille Huma Usman, Pakistani politician and women activist
