= Miqdad Ali Khan Baloch =

Member of the National Assembly of Pakistan from Sargodha (2024–2029)

- مقداد علی خان بلوچ

Member of the National Assembly of Pakistan
- Incumbent
- Assumed office 29 February 2024
- Constituency: NA-86 Sargodha-V

Personal details
- Party: PTI (2024-present)
- Parent: Sardar Shafqat Hayat Khan (father)

Sardar Muhammad Miqdad Ali Khan Baloch (Urdu: سردار محمد مقداد علی خان بلوچ) is a Pakistani politician who has been a member of the National Assembly of Pakistan.

== Political career ==
Baloch won the 2024 Pakistani general election from NA-86 Sargodha-V as an Independent candidate supported by Pakistan Tehreek-e-Insaf (PTI). He received 105,868 votes while runner up Syed Javed Hasnain Shah of Pakistan Muslim League (N) (PML (N)) received 94,479 votes.
