= Shabbir =

Shabbir is a masculine given name of Arabic origin. Notable people with the name include:

== Given name ==
- Shabbir Ahluwalia (born 1979), Indian television actor
- Ahmed Shakeel Shabbir Ahmed (born 1953), Kenyan politician
- Shabbir Ahmad Usmani (1886–1949), eminent Islamic scholar; provided Pakistan with an Islamic system of governance
- Shabbir Ahmed (born 1976), Pakistani cricketer
- Shabbir Banoobhai (born 1949), South African poet
- Shabbir Khan (born 1978), Bangladeshi cricketer who plays first-class cricket for Chittagong Division
- Shabbir Kumar (born 1954), Indian playback singer
- Shabbir Masani, Indian actor who became famous for playing the role of "Yeda" in Satya (1998)
- Shabbir Sharif (1943–1971), Pakistani Major killed in action
- Tariq Shabbir Khan Mayo, member of National Assembly of Pakistan

== See also ==
- Shabbir syndrome (aka "Laryngo–onycho–cutaneous syndrome"), a cutaneous condition inherited in an autosomal recessive fashion
- Husayn ibn Ali, also known by the sobriquet "Shabbir"
