= NA-271 =

NA-271 may refer to:

- NA-271 (Kech), a constituency of the National Assembly of Pakistan
- NA-271 (Kharan-cum-Panjgur), a former constituency of the National Assembly of Pakistan
