= Chahinez =

Chahinez or Chahinaz is a given name. Notable people with the name include:

- Amina Chahinez Hemour (born 1983), Algerian footballer
- Chahinez Nasri (born 1996), Tunisian race walker
- Chahnez M'barki (born 1981), Tunisian judoka

== See also ==
- Shahnaz
