= Mustafa Zaidi =

Urdu language poet

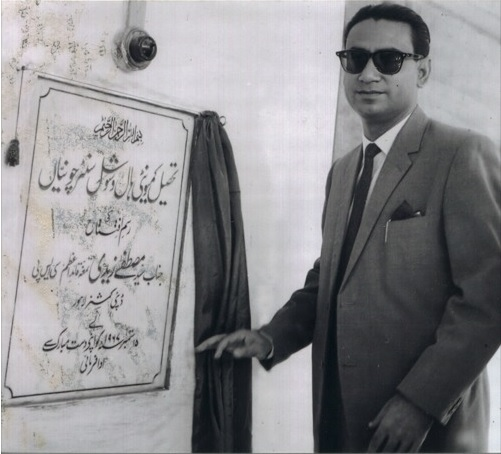
- Mustafa Zaidi as Deputy Commissioner Lahore
- Born: Syed Mustafa Hasnain Zaidi; 10 October 1930; Allahabad, United Provinces, British India
- Died: 12 October 1970 (aged 40); Karachi, Sindh, Pakistan
- Occupation: Poet
- Spouse: Vera Zaidi
- Writing career
- Pen name: Tegh Allahbadi
- Genres: Nazms and Ghazals
- Notable awards: Tamgha-e-Quaid-e-Azam

Mustafa Zaidi (born Syed Mustafa Hasnain Zaidi; 10 October 1930 – 12 October 1970) was a Pakistani Urdu poet and a civil servant.

== Early life ==
In 1954, he passed the competitive examination and was sent to England for training before being given the posts of deputy commissioner and deputy secretary.

He married Vera Zaidi, a German national, with whom he had a son and a daughter.

In June 1970, he was dismissed from civil service along with 38 other Civil Service of Pakistan (CSP) officers by the dictatorial regime of General Yahya Khan.

== Death ==
He died on 12 October 1970, two days after his 40th birthday, in Karachi under mysterious circumstances and was laid to rest at Wadi-e-Hussain cemetery Karachi. At the time of his death, Shahnaz Gul, a contractor's wife, was found beside him unconscious. Some believed that Zaidi was murdered while others thought he committed suicide.

In 2024, Saba Imtiaz and Tooba Masood-Khan wrote Society Girl, which explores Zaidi's mysterious death and his affair with Shahnaz Gul.

== Literary works ==
He also wrote under his pen-name Tegh Allahabadi. His initial poetry was romantic in nature. At the age of 17, he published his first collection of poetry Zangeerein (1949), followed by Roshni (1950), Shehr-e-Azar (City of Idol Worshippers; 1958), Mauj Meri Sadaf Sadaf (1960), Garebaan (1964), Qaba-e-Saaz (1967) and Koh-e-Nida (1971, published posthumously). His complete work was published as Kulliyaat-i-Mustafa Zaidi posthumously.

== See also ==
- List of unsolved deaths
- List of Urdu Poets
