= Sajid Ahmed =

Pakistani politician

Member of the National Assembly of Pakistan
- In office 2008 – 31 May 2018
- Constituency: NA-257 (Karachi-XIX)

Personal details
- Born: 10 July 1973 (age 52) Karachi, Sindh, Pakistan

Sajid Ahmed (Urdu: ساجد احمد; born 10 July 1973) is a Pakistani politician who had been a member of the National Assembly of Pakistan, from 2008 to May 2018.

== Early life ==
He was born on 10 July 1973.

== Political career ==
He was elected to the National Assembly of Pakistan as a candidate of the Muttahida Qaumi Movement (MQM) from the Constituency NA-257 (Karachi-XIX) in the 2008 Pakistani general election. He received 134,498 votes and defeated Riaz Hussain Lund Balouch, a candidate of Pakistan Peoples Party (PPP).

He was re-elected to the National Assembly as a candidate of MQM from Constituency NA-257 (Karachi-XIX) in the 2013 Pakistani general election. He received 125,405 votes and defeated an independent candidate, Farooq Khan.
