= Shahnaz Laghari =

Pakistani Hijabi female pilot

Shahnaz Laghari Urdu: شہناز لغاری
- Born: Lahore, Pakistan
- Occupation: Aviator

Shahnaz Laghari (Urdu: شھناز لغاری) is the first Pakistani Hijabi female pilot to fly aircraft while wearing the hijab. She is also a social worker in her community, running training centers to empower Pakistani women.

== Political career ==
She began her political career as an independent, first participating in the 2013 Pakistani general election for Lahore-IX although she did not succeed. According to Lahore local media, Shahnaz joined the Pakistan Muslim League-Quaid (PMLQ) political party in May 2018.
