= Haji Roz-ud-Din =

Pakistani politician

Member of the National Assembly of Pakistan
- In office 2008–2013
- Constituency: NA-262 (Killa Abdullah)

Haji Roz-ud-Din is a Pakistani politician who was a member of the National Assembly of Pakistan from 2008 to 2013.

== Political career ==
He was elected to the National Assembly of Pakistan from Constituency NA-262 (Killa Abdullah) as a candidate of Muttahida Majlis-e-Amal (MMA) in the 2008 Pakistani general election. He received 45,590 votes and defeated Malik Muhammad Usman Achakzai, a candidate of Awami National Party (ANP).
