= Riaz-ul-Haq =

Pakistani politician

- ریاض الحق

Member of the National Assembly of Pakistan
- Incumbent
- Assumed office 29 February 2024
- Constituency: NA-136 Okara-II
- In office 13 August 2018 – 10 August 2023
- Constituency: NA-142 (Okara-II)
- In office 6 November 2015 – 31 May 2018
- Constituency: NA-144 (Okara-II)

Personal details
- Party: PMLN (2015-present)

Riaz-ul-Haq (Urdu: ریاض الحق) is a Pakistani politician & businessman from Okara.His family is involved in Eatable Oil Business.

== Political career ==
He was elected as member of the National Assembly of Pakistan as an independent candidate from Constituency NA-144 (Okara-II) in by-elections held in 2015. He received 85,714 votes and defeated Ali Arif Chaudhry, a candidate of Pakistan Muslim League (N) (PML-N). In November 2015, he joined PML-N.

He was re-elected to the National Assembly as a candidate of PML-N from Constituency NA-142 (Okara-II) in the 2018 Pakistani general election.
