= Ameer Zaman =

Pakistani politician (1956–2021)

Minister for Postal Services
- In office 4 August 2017 – 31 May 2018
- Prime Minister: Shahid Khaqan Abbasi
- Preceded by: Office established
- Succeeded by: Murad Saeed

Member of the National Assembly of Pakistan
- In office 1 June 2013 – 31 May 2018
- Constituency: NA-263 (Loralai-cum-Musakhel-cum-Barkhan)

Personal details
- Born: 1956 Pakistan
- Died: 7 September 2021 (aged 65)
- Party: Jamiat Ulema-e-Islam (F)

Maulana Ameer Zaman (Urdu: مولانا امیر زمان; 1956 – 7 September 2021) was a Pakistani politician who served as Minister for Postal Services, in Abbasi cabinet from August 2017 to May 2018. He had been a member of the National Assembly of Pakistan from June 2013 to May 2018.

== Political career ==
Zaman ran for the seat of the National Assembly of Pakistan as a candidate of Muttahida Majlis-e-Amal (MMA) from Constituency NA-263 (Loralai) in the 2002 Pakistani general election but was unsuccessful. He received 19,218 votes and lost the seat to Sardar Yaqoob. In the same election, he ran for the seat of the Provincial Assembly of Balochistan as a candidate of MMA from Constituency PB-16 (Loralai-III) but was unsuccessful. He received 7,559 votes and lost the seat to Muhammad Khan Toor, a candidate of Pakistan Muslim League (Q) (PML-Q).

He was elected to the National Assembly as a candidate of Jamiat Ulema-e-Islam (F) (JUI-F) from Constituency NA-263 (Loralai-cum-Musakhel-cum-Barkhan) in the 2013 Pakistani general election. He received 31,031 votes and defeated Sardar Yaqoob.

Following the election of Shahid Khaqan Abbasi as Prime Minister of Pakistan in August 2017, Zaman was inducted into the federal cabinet of Abbasi. He was appointed the Minister for Postal Services after the office was established. Upon the dissolution of the National Assembly on the expiration of its term on 31 May 2018, he ceased to hold the office as Federal Minister for Postal Services.

Zaman died from COVID-19 in 2021.

== See also ==
- List of Deobandis
