= Changez Khan Jamali =

Pakistani politician

Member of the National Assembly of Pakistan
- In office 2008–2013
- Constituency: NA-266 (Nasirabad-cum-Jaffarabad)

Changez Khan Jamali is a Pakistani politician who was a member of the National Assembly of Pakistan from 2008 to 2013.

== Political career ==
He ran for the seat of the Provincial Assembly of Balochistan as a candidate of Pakistan Peoples Party (PPP) from Constituency PB-26 (Nasirabad-II) in the 2008 Pakistani general election but was unsuccessful. He received 9,204 votes and lost the seat to Zahoor Hussain Khoso.

He was elected unopposed to the National Assembly of Pakistan from Constituency NA-266 (Nasirabad-cum-Jaffarabad) as a candidate of PPP in by-election held in May 2009. On 11 February 2011, he was inducted into the federal cabinet of Prime Minister Yousaf Raza Gillani and was appointed as Federal Minister for Science and Technology where he continued to serve until 19 June 2012. On 22 June 2012, he was inducted into the federal cabinet of Prime Minister Raja Pervaiz Ashraf and was re-appointed as Federal Minister for Science and Technology where he continued to serve until 16 March 2013.

He ran for the seat of the National Assembly from Constituency NA-266 (Nasirabad-cum-Jaffarabad) as a candidate of PPP in the 2013 Pakistani general election, but was unsuccessful. He received 17,404 votes and lost the seat to Zafarullah Khan Jamali.
