= Khuram Jehangir Wattoo =

Pakistani politician

Member of the National Assembly of Pakistan
- In office 2008–2013
- Constituency: NA-147 (Okara-V)

Personal details
- Born: 25 February 1976 (age 50)

Khuram Jehangir Wattoo (Urdu: خرم جہانگیر وٹو; born 25 February 1976) is a Pakistani politician who had been a member of the National Assembly of Pakistan from 2008 to 2013.

== Early life ==
He was born on 25 February 1976.

== Political career ==
He was elected to the National Assembly of Pakistan from Constituency NA-147 (Okara-V) as a candidate of Pakistan Peoples Party (PPP) in by-polls held in 2008. He received 79,195 votes and defeated an independent candidate, Muhammad Zafar Yasin Wattoo.

He ran for the seat of the National Assembly from Constituency NA-146 (Okara-IV) as an independent candidate in the 2013 Pakistani general election but was unsuccessful. He received 647 votes and lost the seat to Rao Muhammad Ajmal Khan.
