= Farhat Begum =

Pakistani politician

Member of the National Assembly of Pakistan
- In office 2008–2013

Personal details
- Party: Pakistan Peoples Party

Farhat Begum (Urdu: فرحت بیگم) is a Pakistani politician who has been a member of the National Assembly of Pakistan from 2008 to 2013.

== Political career ==
She was elected to the National Assembly of Pakistan as a candidate of Pakistan Peoples Party on a seat reserved for women from Khyber Pakhtunkhwa in the 2008 Pakistani general election.
