= Talat Mahesar =

Pakistani politician

Talat Iqbal Mahesar
- طلعت اقبال مھيسر

Member of the National Assembly of Pakistan
- In office 2008–2013
- Constituency: NA-233 (Dadu-II)

Talat Iqbal Mahesar (Sindhi:طلعت اقبال مھيسر) is a Pakistani politician who was a member of the National Assembly of Pakistan from 2008 to 2013.

== Political career ==
He ran for the seat of the National Assembly of Pakistan from Constituency NA-233 (Dadu-III) as an independent candidate in the 2002 Pakistani general election, but was unsuccessful. He received 269 and lost the seat to Liaquat Ali Jatoi. In the same election, he ran for the seat of the Provincial Assembly of Sindh as an independent candidate from Constituency PS-77 (Dadu-VII) but was unsuccessful. He received 99 votes and lost the seat to Sadaqat Ali Jatoi, a candidate of Pakistan Muslim League (Q) (PML-Q).

He was elected to the National Assembly from Constituency NA-233 (Dadu-II) as a candidate of Pakistan Peoples Party (PPP) in the 2008 Pakistani general election. He received 83,493 votes and defeated Ihsan Ali Jatoi, a candidate of PML-Q.
