= Waseem Akhtar Shaikh =

Pakistani politician

- وسیم اختر شیخ

Member of the National Assembly of Pakistan
- In office 1 June 2013 – 31 May 2018
- Constituency: NA-139 (Kasur-II)

Personal details
- Born: 1 February 1964 (age 62) Kasur
- Party: Pakistan Muslim League (N)

Waseem Akhtar Shaikh (Urdu: وسیم اختر شیخ; born 1 February 1964) is a Pakistani politician who had been a member of the National Assembly of Pakistan, from June 2013 to May 2018.

== Early life ==
He was born on 1 February 1964.

== Political career ==
He ran for the seat of the National Assembly of Pakistan as a candidate of Pakistan Muslim League (N) (PML-N) from Constituency NA-139 (Kasur-II) in the 2002 Pakistani general election but was unsuccessful. He received 25,007 votes and lost the seat to Chaudhry Manzoor Ahmed, a candidate of Pakistan Peoples Party (PPP).

He was elected to the National Assembly of Pakistan as a candidate of PML-N from Constituency NA-139 (Kasur-II) in the 2008 Pakistani general election. He received 51,436 votes and defeated Chaudhry Manzoor Ahmed, a candidate of PPP.

He was re-elected to the National Assembly as a candidate of PML-N from Constituency NA-139 (Kasur-II) in the 2013 Pakistani general election. He received 102,565 votes and defeated Chaudhry Manzoor Ahmed, a candidate of PPP.
