= Shaheen Ashfaq =

Pakistani politician

Member of the Provincial Assembly of the Punjab
- In office 29 May 2013 – 31 May 2018
- Constituency: Reserved seat for women

Member of the National Assembly of Pakistan
- In office 2008–2013
- Constituency: Reserved seat for women

Personal details
- Born: 21 June 1949 (age 77) Gujranwala
- Party: Pakistan Muslim League (N)

Shaheen Ashfaq (Urdu: شاہین اشفاق; born 21 June 1949) is a Pakistani politician who was a Member of the Provincial Assembly of the Punjab from 2008 to 2013 and again from May 2013 to May 2018.

== Early life and education ==
She was born on 21 June 1949 in Gujranwala.

She earned the degree of Master of Arts in Political Science from the University of the Punjab in 1974.

== Political career ==
She was elected to the National Assembly of Pakistan as a candidate of Pakistan Muslim League (N) on a seat reserved for women from Punjab in the 2008 Pakistani general election.

She was elected to the Provincial Assembly of the Punjab as a candidate of Pakistan Muslim League (N) on a reserved seat for women in the 2013 Pakistani general election. In December 2013, she was appointed as Parliamentary Secretary for cooperative.
