= Abdul Akbar Khan =

Pakistani politician (1949–2017)

- Born: 1 September 1949; Mardan, Pakistan
- Died: 12 January 2017 (aged 67); Islamabad, Pakistan
- Education: University of Peshawar
- Occupation: Politician
- Years active: 1970-2017
- Political party: Pakistan Peoples Party
- Children: 2

Abdul Akbar Khan (1 September 1949 – 12 January 2017) was a Pakistani politician from Mardan. He served as a deputy speaker and speaker of KPK (Then NWFP) assembly and was elected to the provisional assembly as MPA numerous times in 1988, 1990, 1993, 1996, 2002, and 2008 on Pakistan Peoples Party Parliamentarians ticket. He was also elected as a Member of the National Assembly (MNA) on PPP ticket. He died on 12 January 2017 in Islamabad due to heart failure.

== Personal life ==
He belonged to a village Spenkai, Palodheri in Mardan. His father, Sher Akbar Khan, was a prominent land lord in his District. Abdul Akbar Khan got married in 1969 with the daughter of ALI AKBAR KHAN a well known landlord in mardan and then married for a second time in 2000 in Lower Dir district (Asband Village). He got his law (LLB) degree from University of Peshawar. Abdul akbar khan died after a two month long illness while he was at Shifa International Hospital Islamabad at 3 o'clock in the morning of 12 January 2017. Abdul Akbar Khan is survived by his two children. His second wife succeeded him to continue his political legacy.

== Political career ==
Abdul Akbar Khan contested first election in 1970.

Khan started his political career in the early 1970s on the PPP platform and quickly rose through its ranks and was one of close associates and senior advisors of PPP's founder, Zulfiqar Ali Bhutto. Abdul Akbar Khan remained close to Mr. Bhutto until his death in 1979 and later his daughter Benazir Bhutto. He became a member of the PPP Central Executive Committee in the 1970s. When General Ziaul Haq dissolved assemblies after imposing Martial Law on 5 July 1977, Abdul Akbar Khan, being a close associate of the PPP founder Zulfikar Ali Bhutto, was also put behind bars. But his loyalty with the party ideology could never be shaken. After the 1988 General Elections, he was appointed as Deputy Speaker KPK Assembly (then N.W.F-P Assembly). He became the Speaker of the KPK Assembly in 1993. He also served as PPPP parliamentary leader in the KPK Assembly from 2002 to 2013. He was also elected to the National Assembly in 2008 as MNA but resigned to keep his seat in the provisional assembly in KPK. After his death, his second wife has been introduced as his political successor.
