= Farzana Mushtaq Ghani =

Pakistani politician

Member of the National Assembly of Pakistan
- In office 2008–2013

Personal details
- Spouse: Mushtaq Ahmed Ghani

Farzana Mushtaq Ghani (Urdu: فرزانہ مشتاق غنی) is a Pakistani politician who served as member of the National Assembly of Pakistan from 2008 to 2013. Her husband, Mushtaq Ahmed Ghani, is the speaker of the provincial Assembly of Khyber Pakhtunkhwa Pakistan. She is from the city of Pine & Chinars Abbottabad.

== Political career ==
She was elected to the National Assembly of Pakistan as a candidate of Pakistan Muslim League (Q) on a seat reserved for women from Khyber Pakhtunkhwa in the 2008 Pakistani general election.
