= Munira Shakir =

Pakistani politician

Member of the National Assembly of Pakistan
- In office 2012–2013

Munira Shakir (Urdu: منیرا شاکر) is a Pakistani politician who served as member of the National Assembly of Pakistan.

== Political career ==
She was elected to the National Assembly of Pakistan as a candidate of Pakistan Peoples Party on a seat reserved for women from Sindh in 2012.
