= NA-132 =

NA-132 may refer to:

- NA-132 (Lahore-X), a constituency for the National Assembly of Pakistan
- NA-132 (Sheikhupura-II-cum-Nankana Sahib), a former constituency for the National Assembly of Pakistan
