= Constituency NA-267 =

Former constituency of the National Assembly of Pakistan

Constituency NA-267 (Kachhi)
- Former constituency for the National Assembly of Pakistan
- Region: Kachhi District

Former constituency
- Abolished: 2018
- Replaced by: NA-260 (Nasirabad-cum-Kachhi-cum-Jhal Magsi)

Constituency NA-267 (Kachhi) (Urdu: این اے-۲۶۷، کھچی) was a constituency for the National Assembly of Pakistan.

== Election 2002 ==
General elections were held on 10 October 2002. Sardar Yar Muhammad Rind of National Alliance won by 57,751 votes.

General election 2002: NA-267 (Kachhi-cum-Jhal Magsi)
Party	Candidate	Votes	%	±%
NA	Sardar Yar Muhammad Rind	57,751	73.82	
PPP	Nawab Muhammad Aslam Khan	10,302	13.17	
BNM	Dr. Abdul Hayee Baloch	5,456	6.97	
MMA	Syed Abdul Malik Shah	3,904	4.99	
Others	Others (three candidates)	817	1.05	
Turnout		80,014	34.66	
Total valid votes		78,230	97.77	
Rejected ballots		1,784	2.23	
Majority		47,449	60.65	
Registered electors		230,836		

== Election 2008 ==
General elections were held on 18 February 2008. Mir Humayun Aziz Kurd an independent candidate won by 61,249 votes.

General election 2008: NA-267 (Kachhi-cum-Jhal Magsi)
Party	Candidate	Votes	%	±%
Independent	Mir Hamayun Aziz Kurd	61,249	54.91	
PML(Q)	Sardar Yar Muhammad Rind	48,275	43.28	
Others	Others (four candidates)	2,025	1.81	
Turnout		113,569	46.92	
Total valid votes		111,549	98.22	
Rejected ballots		2,020	1.78	
Majority		12,974	11.63	
Registered electors		242,024		

== Election 2013 ==
General elections were held on 11 May 2013. Khalid Hussain Magsi of PML-N won by 42,240 votes while his close rival, an independent, Abdul Raheem Rind received 38,915 votes. Magsi was disqualified by Supreme Court of Pakistan and re elections were ordered to be held on 28 April 2016.

General election 2013: NA-267 (Kachhi-cum-Jhal Magsi)
Party	Candidate	Votes	%	±%
Independent	Khalid Hussain Magsi	42,240	47.85	
Independent	Abdul Raheem Rind	38,915	44.08	
PML(N)	Amir Aziz Kurd	2,272	2.57	
JUI (F)	Mangey Khan Rahija	1,012	1.15	
Others	Others (eighteen candidates)	3,841	4.35	
Turnout		90,728	61.47	
Total valid votes		88,280	97.30	
Rejected ballots		2,448	2.70	
Majority		3,325	3.77	
Registered electors		147,595		

== By-Election 2016 ==
Khalid Hussain Magsi of Pakistan Muslim League (N) retained his seat in a by-election held on 28 April 2016 defeating Yar Muhammad Rind of Pakistan Tehreek-e-Insaaf. He secured over 29,630 votes compared to 19,533 votes of Rind. The voter turnout was 38.68%.

By-Election 2016: NA-267 (Kachhi-cum-Jhal Magsi)
Party	Candidate	Votes	%	±%
PML(N)	Khalid Hussain Magsi	29,630	54.73	
PTI	Sardar Yar Muhammad Rind	19,533	36.08	
Independent	Humayun Aziz	1,500	2.77	
JUI (F)	Syed Arshad-ud-Din Shah	1,396	2.58	
Others	Others (twelve candidates)	2,076	3.84	
Turnout		56,485	38.68	
Total valid votes		54,135	95.84	
Rejected ballots		2,350	4.16	
Majority		10,097	18.65	
Registered electors		146,049		
