= Nisar Baaz =

Member of the Provincial Assembly of Khyber Pakhtunkhwa from Bajaur (2024–2029)

- نثار باز

Member of the Provincial Assembly of Khyber Pakhtunkhwa
- Incumbent
- Assumed office 11 July 2024
- Constituency: PK-22 Bajaur-IV

Personal details
- Party: ANP (2024-present)

Muhammad Nisar Baaz Khan (Urdu: محمد نثار باز خان), is a Pakistani politician who has been a Member for the Provincial Assembly of Khyber Pakhtunkhwa, in office since July 2024.

== Early life and education ==
Baaz was born on 13 January 1985 and obtained a Master's degree in Journalism and Mass Communication.

== Political career ==
He started his political career in 2002 as a member of the Pakhtun Students Federation.

Baaz was elected to the Provincial Assembly of Khyber Pakhtunkhwa from PK-22 Bajaur-IV constituency in a by-election held on 11 July 2024. He received 11,926 votes as a candidate of Awami National Party while the runner up Independent candidate Najibullah Khan received 10,622 votes.
