= Sabeen Rizvi =

Pakistani politician

Member of the National Assembly of Pakistan
- In office 2008–2012

Sabeen Rizvi (Urdu: سبین رضوی) is a Pakistani politician who served as member of the National Assembly of Pakistan.

== Political career ==
She was elected to the National Assembly of Pakistan as a candidate of Pakistan Muslim League (N) on a seat reserved for women from Punjab in the 2008 Pakistani general election. She resigned from her National Assembly seat in 2012.
