= Nighat Parveen =

Pakistani politician

Member of the National Assembly of Pakistan
- In office 17 March 2008 – 31 May 2018
- Constituency: Reserved seat for women

Personal details
- Party: Pakistan Muslim League (N)

Nighat Parveen (Urdu: نگہت پروین) was a Pakistani politician who had been a member of the National Assembly of Pakistan, from March 2008 to May 2018. She died on April 24, 2019.

== Political career ==
She was elected to the National Assembly of Pakistan as a candidate of Pakistan Muslim League (N) on a seat reserved for women from Punjab in the 2008 Pakistani general election.

She was re-elected to the National Assembly of Pakistan as a candidate of Pakistan Muslim League (N) on a reserved seat for women from Punjab in the 2013 Pakistani general election.

== Death ==
Nighat Parveen died on 24 April 2019 in Pakistan's Jhelum. Before her death, she was hospitalised for her eyes operation where she had Hemorrhagic stroke. She died on 24 April 2019 while in coma.
