= Sardar Shafqat Hayat Khan =

Pakistani politician

- سردارشفقت حیات خان

Member of the National Assembly of Pakistan
- In office 30 August 2013 – 31 May 2018
- Constituency: NA-68 (Sargodha-V)
- In office 2010–2013
- Constituency: NA-68 (Sargodha-V)

Personal details
- Party: Pakistan Muslim League (N)
- Children: Miqdad Ali Khan Baloch (son)

Sardar Muhammad Shafqat Hayat Khan Baloch (Urdu: سردار محمد شفقت حیات خان بلوچ) is a Pakistani politician who had been a member of the National Assembly of Pakistan, from 2010 to March 2013 and again from August 2013 to May 2018. Sardar Shafqat Khan belongs to the chief baloch family of Sahiwal town.

== Political career ==
He ran for the seat of the Provincial Assembly of the Punjab as a candidate of Pakistan Muslim League (N) (PML-N) from Constituency PP-37 (Sargodha-X) in the 2002 Pakistani general election but was unsuccessful. He received 13,281 votes and lost the seat to an independent candidate, Major (Retd)Asghar Hayat Kalyar who secured 30,422 votes.

He ran for the seat of the Provincial Assembly of the Punjab as an independent candidate from Constituency PP-37 (Sargodha-X) in the 2008 Pakistani general election but was unsuccessful. He received 2,288 votes and lost the seat to Sahibzada Ghulam Nizam-ud-Din Sialvi.

He was elected to the National Assembly of Pakistan as a candidate of PML-N from Constituency NA-68 (Sargodha-V) in a by-election held in 2010. He received 90,253 votes and defeated Mian Mazhar Qureshi.

He was re-elected to the National Assembly as a candidate of PML-N from Constituency NA-68 (Sargodha-V) in the 2013 Pakistani general election. He received 67,888 votes and defeated an independent candidate, Javaid Hasnain Shah. During his tenure as Member of the National Assembly, he served as the Federal Parliamentary Secretary for Overseas Pakistanis and Human Resource Development and Inter Provincial Coordination.
