= Sumaira Yasir Rasheed =

Pakistani politician

Member of the National Assembly of Pakistan
- In office 2008–2013
- Constituency: NA-115 (Narowal-I)

Sumaira Yasir Rasheed is a Pakistani politician who had been a member of the National Assembly of Pakistan from 2008 to 2013.

== Political career ==
She ran for the seat of the National Assembly of Pakistan from Constituency NA-115 (Narowal-I) as an independent candidate in the 2002 Pakistani general election but was unsuccessful. She received 27,316 votes and lost the seat to Muhammad Nasir Khan, a candidate of Pakistan Muslim League (Q) (PML-Q).

She was elected to the National Assembly from Constituency NA-115 (Narowal-I) as a candidate of Pakistan Muslim League (N) in the 2008 Pakistani general election. She received 59,688 votes and defeated Muhammad Naseer Khan, a candidate of PML-Q.
