= Samina Mushtaq Pagganwala =

Pakistani politician

Samina Mushtaq

Member of the National Assembly of Pakistan
- In office 2008–2013

Samina Mushtaq Pagganwala (Urdu: ثمینہ مشتاق پگانوالہ) is a Pakistani politician who served as member of the National Assembly of Pakistan.

== Political career ==
She was elected to the National Assembly of Pakistan as a candidate of Pakistan Peoples Party on a seat reserved for women from Punjab in the 2008 Pakistani general election. In 2011, she was appointed parliamentary secretary for Kashmir affairs and Gilgit-Baltistan.
