= Qudsia Arshad =

Pakistani politician

Member of the National Assembly of Pakistan
- In office 2008–2013

Qudsia Arshad (Urdu: قدسیہ ارشد) is a Pakistani politician who served as a member of the National Assembly of Pakistan.

== Political career ==
She was elected to the National Assembly of Pakistan as a candidate of Pakistan Muslim League (N) on a seat reserved for women from Punjab in the 2008 Pakistani general election.
