= Imtiaz Sultan Bukhari =

Pakistani politician

Member of the National Assembly of Pakistan
- In office 2008–2013

Imtiaz Sultan Bukhari (Urdu: امتیاز سلطان بخاری) is a Pakistani politician who served as member of the National Assembly of Pakistan.

== Political career ==
She was elected to the Provincial Assembly of Khyber Pakhtunkhwa as a candidate of Pakistan Muslim League (N) on a seat reserved for women in the 2002 Pakistani general election.

She was elected to the National Assembly of Pakistan as a candidate of Pakistan Muslim League (N) on a seat reserved for women from Khyber Pakhtunkhwa in the 2008 Pakistani general election.

She served as President of the women wing of Pakistan Muslim League (N).
