= Constituency NA-261 =

Former constituency of the National Assembly of Pakistan

Constituency NA-261 (Pishin-cum-Ziarat)
- Former constituency for the National Assembly of Pakistan
- Region: Karachi District

Former constituency
- Abolished: 2018
- Replaced by: NA-258 (Loralai-cum-Musakhel-cum-Ziarat-cum-Duki-cum-Harnai); NA-262 (Pishin)

Constituency NA-261 (Pishin-cum-Ziarat) (Urdu: این اے-۲۶١، پشين-چاغىزيارت) was a constituency for the National Assembly of Pakistan.

== Election 2002 ==
General elections were held on 10 Oct 2002. Haji Gul Muhammad Dummar of Muttahida Majlis-e-Amal won by 37,022 votes.

General election 2002: NA-261 Pishin-Ziarat
Party	Candidate	Votes	%	±%
MMA	Gul Muhammad Dummar	37,022	52.13	
PMAP	Dr. Kaleemullah Khan	17,599	24.78	
PML(Q)	Khalid Khan Kakar	12,914	18.19	
ANP	Nizamuddin Kakar	1,162	1.64	
Others	Others (eight candidates)	2,319	3.26	
Turnout		75,061	27.72	
Total valid votes		71,016	94.61	
Rejected ballots		4,045	5.39	
Majority		19,423	27.35	
Registered electors		270,777		

== Election 2008 ==
General elections were held on 18 Feb 2008. Molvi Agha Muhammad of Muttahida Majlis-e-Amal won by 30,611 votes.

General election 2008: NA-261 Pishin-Ziarat
Party	Candidate	Votes	%	±%
MMA	Agha Muhammad	30,611	37.41	
PML(Q)	Muhammad Samar Khan Kakar	23,350	28.54	
Independent	Syed Muhammad Fazal Agha	10,385	12.69	
Independent	Dr. Taj Muhammad	5,231	6.39	
PPP	Muhammad Yaqoob Ziaratwal	4,178	5.11	
ANP	Abdul Rasheed Nasir	2,355	2.88	
PML(N)	Akhundzada Badruddin	1,980	2.42	
Independent	Syed Fazal Muhammad Agha	1,220	1.49	
Others	Others (nine candidates)	2,510	3.07	
Turnout		85,011	28.57	
Total valid votes		81,820	96.25	
Rejected ballots		3,191	3.75	
Majority		7,261	8.87	
Registered electors		297,591		

== Election 2013 ==
General elections were held on 11 May 2013. Moulvi Agha Muhammad of JUI-F won by 48,712 votes and became the member of National Assembly.

General election 2013: NA-261 Pishin-Ziarat
Party	Candidate	Votes	%	±%
JUI (F)	Agha Muhammad	48,712	36.79	
PMAP	Muhammad Essa Roshan	48,188	36.40	
JUINP	Malik Abdul Qayum Kakar	24,679	18.64	
ANP	Nizamuddin Kakar	4,274	3.23	
PTI	Nawab Khan Dumer	2,920	2.21	
Others	Others (twelve candidates)	3,629	2.73	
Turnout		136,313	54.93	
Total valid votes		132,402	97.13	
Rejected ballots		3,911	2.87	
Majority		524	0.39	
Registered electors		248,179		
