= Tasneem Siddiqui =

Pakistani politician

Member of the National Assembly of Pakistan
- In office 2008–2013
- Constituency: reserved seat for women

Tasneem Siddiqui (Urdu: تسنیم صدیقی) is a Pakistani politician who had been a member of the National Assembly of Pakistan from 2008 to 2013.

== Political career ==
She was elected to the National Assembly of Pakistan as a candidate of Pakistan Muslim League (N) on a seat reserved for women from Punjab in the 2008 Pakistani general election.
