= NA-86 Sargodha-V =

Constituency of the National Assembly of Pakistan

- Constituency for the National Assembly of Pakistan
- Region: Shahpur Tehsil, Sahiwal Tehsil and Sargodha Tehsil (partly) of Sargodha District
- Electorate: 539,128

Current constituency
- Party: Pakistan Tehreek-e-Insaf
- Member: Miqdad Ali Khan Baloch
- Created from: NA-68 Sargodha-V

NA-86 Sargodha-V (این اے-86، سرگودھا-۵) is a constituency for the National Assembly of Pakistan.

== Members of Parliament ==
=== 2002–2018: NA-68 Sargodha-V ===
Election	Member	Party
2002	Mazhar Ahmed Qureshi	PML (Q)
2008	Syed Javed Hasnain Shah	PML (N)
2010 by-election	Sardar Shafqat Hayat Khan	PML (N)
2013	Muhammad Nawaz Sharif	PML (N)
2013 by-election	Sardar Shafqat Hayat Khan	PML (N)

=== 2018–2023: NA-92 Sargodha-V ===
Election	Member	Party
2018	Syed Javed Hasnain Shah	PML (N)

=== 2024–present: NA-86 Sargodha-V ===
Election	Member	Party
2024	Miqdad Ali Khan Baloch	PTI

== Election 2002 ==
General elections were held on 10 October 2002. Mian Mazhar Ahmed Qureshi, son of Mian Ameer Haider Qureshi, two-times (former) Senator of PML-Q won by 84,038 votes. Mian Mazhar Qureshi hailed from a prominent political family in this constituency. His uncle Nawabzada Zakir Qureshi was a former MNA and minister. His other uncle Nawabzada Saeed Qureshi was a former District Mayor. His cousins Nawabzada Ilyas and Nawabzada Munir are former MPAs.

General election 2002: NA-68 Sargodha-V
Party	Candidate	Votes	%	±%
PML(Q)	Mazhar Ahmed Qureshi	84,038	54.54	
PML(N)	Syed Mansoor Ali Shah	56,958	36.97	
PAT	Ch. Muhammad Ashraf Chadhar	4,953	3.21	
PPP	Malik Farhat Abbas Chavaka	4,632	3.01	
Independent	Ch. Anwar Ali Cheema	3,294	2.14	
Independent	Asif Ali Sheikh	211	0.13	
Turnout		158,711	51.56	
Total valid votes		154,086	97.09	
Rejected ballots		4,625	2.91	
Majority		27,080	17.57	
Registered electors		307,801		

== Election 2008 ==
The result of general election 2008 in this constituency is given below.

=== Result ===
Syed Javed Hassnain Shah succeeded in the election 2008 and became a member of the National Assembly.

General election 2008: NA-68 Sargodha-V
Party	Candidate	Votes	%	±%
PML(N)	Syed Javed Hassnain Shah	80,174	44.41	
PML(Q)	Mazhar Ahmed Qureshi	56,959	31.55	
Independent	Ch. Farrukh Javaid Ghuman	38,516	21.34	
Others	Others (two candidates)	4,872	2.70	
Turnout		186,554	48.60	
Total valid votes		180,521	96.77	
Rejected ballots		6,033	3.23	
Majority		23,215	12.86	
Registered electors		383,849		
PML(N) gain from PML(Q)				

== By-Election 2010 ==
A by-election was held in this constituency in 2010. Sardar Shafqat Hayat Khan of PML-N defeated Mian Mazhar Ahmed Qureshi, an independent candidate.

By-Election 2010: NA-68 Sargodha-V
Party	Candidate	Votes	%	±%
PML(N)	Sardar Muhammad Shafqat Hayat Khan	88,952	59.26	
Independent	Mian Mazhar Ahmad Qureshi	58,589	39.03	
Independent	Rai Sikandar Hayat Bhatti	2,264	1.51	
Independent	Syed Sajad Hussain Sherazi	299	0.20	
Turnout		153,693	40.05	
Total valid votes		150,104	97.61	
Rejected ballots		3,589	2.39	
Majority		30,363	20.23	
Registered electors		383,743		
PML(N) hold				

== Election 2013 ==
General elections were held on 11 May 2013. Nawaz Sharif, the leader of PML-N, won by securing 140,546 votes against Mian Noor Hayat of PTI who got 45,483 votes. However, Sharif vacated this seat in favour of NA-120 Lahore-III and a by-election was held.

General election 2013: NA-68 Sargodha-V
Party	Candidate	Votes	%	±%
PML(N)	Nawaz Sharif	140,828	63.14	
PTI	Noor Hayat Kalyar	45,584	20.44	
PPP	Syed Nusrat Ali Shah	21,418	9.60	
Others	Others (twelve candidates)	15,201	6.82	
Turnout		230,311	61.71	
Total valid votes		223,031	96.84	
Rejected ballots		7,280	3.16	
Majority		95,244	42.70	
Registered electors		373,233		
PML(N) hold				

== By-election 2013 ==
A by-election was held on 22 August 2013. Sardar Shafqat Hayat Khan won the election with 67,888 votes, defeating Syed Javed Hasnain Shah, an independent candidate.

By-election 2013: NA-68 Sargodha-V
Party	Candidate	Votes	%	±%
PML(N)	Sardar Muhammad Shafqat Hayat Khan	67,888	43.61	
Independent	Syed Javed Hassnain Shah	42,472	27.28	
PTI	Malik Nazir Ahmed Sobhi	40,169	25.80	
Others	Others (seven candidates)	5,142	3.31	
Turnout		160,518	43.01	
Total valid votes		155,671	96.98	
Rejected ballots		4,847	3.02	
Majority		25,416	16.33	
Registered electors		373,232		
PML(N) hold				

== Election 2018 ==
General elections were held on 25 July 2018.

General election 2018: NA-92 Sargodha-V
Party	Candidate	Votes	%	±%
PML(N)	Syed Javed Hasnain Shah	97,013	36.83	
PTI	Sahibzada Naeemuddin Sialvi	65,406	24.83	
Independent	Mian Zafar Ahmed Qureshi	57,064	21.63	
Others	Others (eight candidates)	34,923	13.26	
Turnout		263,373	56.81	
Rejected ballots		9,061	3.45	
Majority		31,607	12.00	
Registered electors		463,591		
PML(N) hold		Swing	N/A	

== Election 2024 ==
General elections were held on 8 February 2024. Miqdad Ali Khan Baloch (backed by PTI) won the election with 105,882 votes.

General election 2024: NA-86 Sargodha-V
Party	Candidate	Votes	%	±%
PTI	Miqdad Ali Khan Baloch (Note: Filed nomination papers as PTI candidate but ECP allowed him to run as an Independent)	105,882	40.59	▲15.76
PML(N)	Syed Javed Hasnain Shah	94,487	36.22	▼0.61
PPP	Muhammad Jamshed	20,951	8.03	▲1.42
TLP	Haji Allah Dad	17,299	6.63	▲3.68
Others	Others (eleven candidates)	22,216	8.52	
Turnout		274,091	50.84	▼5.97
Total valid votes		260,835	95.16	
Rejected ballots		13,256	4.84	
Majority		11,395	4.37	
Registered electors		539,128		

== See also ==
- NA-85 Sargodha-IV
- NA-87 Khushab-I
