= Mir Humayun Aziz Kurd =

Pakistani politician

Member of the National Assembly of Pakistan
- In office 2008–2013
- Constituency: NA-267 (Bolan-cum-Jhal Magsi)

Mir Humayun Aziz Kurd is a Pakistani politician who was a member of the National Assembly of Pakistan from 2008 to 2013.

== Political career ==
He was elected to the National Assembly of Pakistan from Constituency NA-267 (Bolan-cum-Jhal Magsi) as an independent candidate in the 2008 Pakistani general election. He received 61,249 votes and defeated Sardar Yar Muhammad Rind, a candidate of Pakistan Muslim League (Q) (PML-Q).

In April 2008, he was inducted into the federal cabinet of Prime Minister Yousaf Raza Gillani and was made Federal Minister for population welfare. In November 2008, his ministerial portfolio was changed and he was appointed as Federal Minister for livestock and dairy development where he served until February 2011.
