= NA-136 Okara-II =

Constituency of the National Assembly of Pakistan

- Constituency for the National Assembly of Pakistan
- Region: Okara Tehsil (partly) including Okara City and of Okara District
- Electorate: 508,896

Current constituency
- Party: Pakistan Muslim League (N)
- Member: Riaz-ul-Haq
- Created from: NA-144 Okara-II

NA-136 Okara-II (این اے-136، اوكاڑا-۲) is a constituency for the National Assembly of Pakistan.

== Members of Parliament ==
=== 2018–2023: NA-142 Okara-II ===
Election	Member	Party
2018	Riaz-ul-Haq	PML(N)

=== 2024–present: NA-136 Okara-II ===
Election	Member	Party
2024	Riaz-ul-Haq	PML(N)

== Election 2002 ==
General elections were held on 10 October 2002. Rao Sikandar Iqbal of PPP won by 63,713 votes.

General election 2002: NA-144 Okara-II
Party	Candidate	Votes	%	±%
PPP	Rao Sikandar Iqbal	63,713	63.79	
PML(Q)	Rana Ikram Rabani	33,366	33.40	
Others	Others (four candidates)	2,808	2.81	
Turnout		102,436	44.22	
Total valid votes		99,887	97.51	
Rejected ballots		2,549	2.49	
Majority		30,347	30.39	
Registered electors		231,670		

== Election 2008 ==
General elections were held on 18 February 2008. Sajid Ul Hassan an independent candidate won by 77,795 votes.

General election 2008: NA-144 Okara-II
Party	Candidate	Votes	%	±%
Independent	Ch. Sajjad UI Hassan	77,795	65.90	
PML(Q)	Rao Sikandar Iqbal	33,527	28.40	
PML(N)	Mian Yawar Zaman	4,333	3.67	
Others	Others (six candidates)	2,389	2.03	
Turnout		122,124	40.50	
Total valid votes		118,044	96.66	
Rejected ballots		4,080	3.34	
Majority		44,268	37.50	
Registered electors		301,559		
Independent gain from PPP				

== Election 2013 ==
Elections were held on 11 May 2013 Muhammad Arif Ch of Pakistan Muslim League N won by 103,868 votes and became the member of National Assembly.

General election 2013: NA-144 Okara-II
Party	Candidate	Votes	%	±%
PML(N)	Muhammad Arif Ch.	105,162	62.19	
PPP	Shafeeqa Baghum Rao Sikindar	36,723	21.72	
PTI	Rao Khalid Khan	18,648	11.03	
Others	Others (twenty five candidates)	8,557	5.06	
Turnout		173,254	59.05	
Total valid votes		169,090	97.60	
Rejected ballots		4,164	2.40	
Majority		68,439	40.37	
Registered electors		293,394		
PML(N) gain from independent politician				

== By-election 2015 ==
By-election 2015: NA-144 Okara-II
Party	Candidate	Votes	%	±%
Independent	Chaudhry Riaz Ul Haq	85,714	54.44	
PML(N)	Ali Arif Cahudhry	45,199	28.71	
Independent	Abdul Sattar	14,186	9.01	
Others	Others (six candidates)	12,360	7.84	
Turnout		161,689	51.11	
Total valid votes		157,459	97.38	
Rejected ballots		4,230	2.62	
Majority		40,515	25.73	
Registered electors		316,370		
independent politician gain from PML(N)				

== Election 2018 ==
General elections were held on 25 July 2018.

General election 2018: NA-142 Okara-II
Party	Candidate	Votes	%	±%
PML(N)	Riaz-ul-Haq	140,733	59.84	
PTI	Rao Hasan Sikandar	76,592	32.57	
Others	Others (ten candidates)	17,867	7.59	
Turnout		239,652	56.81	
Total valid votes		235,192	98.14	
Rejected ballots		4,460	1.86	
Majority		64,141	27.27	
Registered electors		421,873		
PML(N) gain from Independent				

== Election 2024 ==
General elections were held on 8 February 2024. Riaz-ul-Haq won the election with 127,806 votes.

General election 2024: NA-136 Okara-II
Party	Candidate	Votes	%	±%
PML(N)	Riaz-ul-Haq	127,806	49.52	▼10.32
PTI	Rao Hasan Sikandar (Note: Filed nomination papers as PTI candidate but ECP allowed him to run as an independent)	80,191	31.07	▼1.50
Others	Others (seventeen candidates)	50,116	19.42	
Turnout		265,404	52.15	▼4.66
Total valid votes		258,113	97.25	
Rejected ballots		7,291	2.75	
Majority		47,615	18.45	▼8.82
Registered electors		508,896		
PML(N) hold				

== See also ==
- NA-135 Okara-I
- NA-137 Okara-III
