= Chaudhry Zahid Iqbal =

British Pakistani former politician

Member of the National Assembly of Pakistan
- In office 2008–2013
- Constituency: NA-162 (Sahiwal-III)

Personal details
- Party: TLP (2025-present)
- Other political affiliations: PPP (2008-2025)

Chaudhry Zahid Iqbal is a British Pakistani former politician who had been a member of the National Assembly of Pakistan from 2008 to 2013.

== Political career ==
He ran for the seat of the Provincial Assembly of the Punjab as a candidate of Pakistan Peoples Party (PPP) from Constituency PP-224 (Sahiwal-V) in the 2002 Pakistani general election, but was unsuccessful. He received 21,505 votes and lost the seat to Waheed Asghar Dogar.

He was elected to the National Assembly of Pakistan from Constituency NA-162 (Sahiwal-III) as a candidate of PPP in the 2008 Pakistani general election. He received 70,634 votes and defeated an independent candidate, Rai Aziz Ullah Khan.

In 2012, his National Assembly membership was suspended due his citizenship of the United Kingdom.

In 2013, he joined Pakistan Muslim League (N) (PML-N) before 2013 Pakistani general election. Later, he was disqualified by the Lahore High Court for holding dual citizenship.
