= Shahnaz Gul =

Pakistani socialite

- Born: Shahnaz Gul Begum; 1944; Gujranwala, British India
- Died: 2010 (aged 65–66); Karachi, Sindh, Pakistan
- Other names: Shahnaz Saleem; Shahnaz Saleem Gul; Shahnaz Saleem Khan
- Occupation: Socialite
- Years active: 1961–2000
- Spouse: Saleem Khan (husband)
- Children: 2

Shahnaz Gul (1944–2010), also known as Shahnaz Saleem or Shahnaz Saleem Gul, was a Pakistani socialite who became nationally notorious as the central figure in a high-profile scandal surrounding the mysterious death of the acclaimed Urdu poet Mustafa Zaidi in 1970. The case, which involved a sensationalized murder trial, is often revisited as a significant cultural and historical event in Pakistan.

== Early life and background ==
Shahnaz Gul was born in 1944. She grew up in Gujranwala in a wealthy, conservative family descended from Afghan nobility that had migrated from Ludhiana during the Partition of India. She was known for her striking physical beauty, with "alabaster-like skin, perfect features, wavy hair". Contrary to common assumptions after the scandal, those who knew her stated she was neither highly educated nor a lover of poetry.

At the age of 17, she was married to Saleem Khan, a UK-educated divorcee some 30 years her senior. They lived in Karachi and had two daughters, Mahenaz Khanum and Mehrnaz Khanum.

== The Mustafa Zaidi incident ==
In the late 1960s, Gul and the prominent poet and civil servant Mustafa Zaidi met at an elite club in Karachi. Zaidi became infatuated with her and wrote a series of five poems dedicated to her, titled Shahnaz, which were published in his collection. These were the last five poems of his life, which were published in his posthumous collected works. Their affair was an open secret within Karachi's high society, and it caused a rift with Zaidi's German wife, who returned to Germany with their two children.

On the morning of October 12, 1970, Zaidi was found dead at his home from an apparent barbiturate overdose. Shahnaz Gul was found unconscious in an adjoining room. She was taken to Jinnah Postgraduate Medical Centre, where a photograph of her in a hospital bed with a police officer by her bedside became a front-page sensation, fueling speculation and intense media interest. The incident sparked a national media frenzy, filled with gossip about the lives of the wealthy elite.

The incident sparked a media frenzy, with newspapers running daily stories filled with gossip and speculation about the lives of the wealthy elite. The media coverage was described as voyeuristic, with some newspapers focusing on lurid details and moralizing discourse about the upper class.

== Trial and later life ==
Shahnaz Gul was charged with murder in connection with Zaidi's death, leading to a highly publicized trial that captivated the Pakistani public. In May 1972, she was acquitted of all charges due to lack of convincing evidence in a 32-page judgment after a trial that became a national obsession. The exact circumstances of Zaidi's death remain a mystery, contributing to the case's enduring fascination.

After her acquittal, Gul resumed attending social events but never spoke to the press. Her husband, Saleem Khan, stood by her throughout the ordeal. The authors of a book about the scandal spoke to one of her daughters, who did not wish to participate in the project.

== Personal life ==
She married Saleem Khan and the couple had two daughters.

== Death ==
She died in 2010 from ovarian cancer in Karachi ,Pakistan and details of her death were kept private by her family.

== In popular culture ==
- The 2021 book Society Girl: A Tale of Sex, Lies, and Scandal by Saba Imtiaz and Tooba Masood-Khan, and its accompanying podcast Notes on a Scandal, provide a detailed investigation into the case and use it to explore the social history of 1970s Pakistan.
- The Urdu play "Main Adakara Nahin" (I am not an actress) also references the trial and the societal reaction to Shahnaz Gul.
