= Omer Sohail Zia Butt =

Pakistani politician

Member of the National Assembly of Pakistan
- In office 2008–2013
- Constituency: NA-126 (Lahore-IX)

Personal details
- Born: 19 July 1980 (age 46)

Omer Sohail Zia Butt (Urdu: عمر سہیل ضیا بٹ; born 19 July 1980) is a Pakistani politician who had been a member of the National Assembly of Pakistan from 2008 to 2013.

== Early life ==
He was born on 19 July 1980.

His father Sohail Zia Butt is a former PML-N MPA and the brother-in-law of Nawaz Sharif.

== Political career ==
He was elected to the National Assembly of Pakistan from Constituency NA-126 (Lahore-IX) as a candidate of Pakistan Muslim League (N) (PML-N) in the 2008 Pakistani general election. He received 69,718 votes and defeated Syed Hasnat Ahmed, a candidate of Pakistan Peoples Party (PPP).
