= Suraiya Jatoi =

Pakistani politician

Member of the National Assembly of Pakistan
- In office 17 March 2008 – 31 May 2018
- Constituency: Reserved seat for women

Personal details
- Party: Pakistan Peoples Party

Suraiya Jatoi (Urdu: ثریا جتوئی) is a Pakistani politician who had been a member of the National Assembly of Pakistan, from March 2008 to May 2018.

== Political career ==
She was elected at the National Assembly of Pakistan as a candidate of Pakistan Peoples Party on a seat reserved for women from Sindh in the 2008 Pakistani general election.

She was re-elected at the National Assembly of Pakistan as a candidate of Pakistan Peoples Party on reserved seats for women from Sindh in the 2013 Pakistani general election.
