= Shaheen Shafiq =

Pakistani politician

Member of the National Assembly of Pakistan
- In office 17 March 2008 – 31 May 2018
- Constituency: Reserved seat for women

Personal details
- Party: Pakistan Muslim League (N)

Shaheen Shafiq (Urdu: شاہین شفیق) is a Pakistani politician who was a member of the National Assembly of Pakistan from March 2008 to May 2018.

== Political career ==
She was elected to the National Assembly of Pakistan as a candidate of Pakistan Muslim League (N) on a seat reserved for women from Punjab in the 2008 Pakistani general election.

She was re-elected to the National Assembly of Pakistan as a candidate of Pakistan Muslim League (N) on a reserved seat for women from Punjab in the 2013 Pakistani general election and served as the Federal Parliamentary Secretary for States and Frontier Regions.
