= Syed Javed Hasnain Shah =

Pakistani politician

Member of the National Assembly of Pakistan
- In office 13 August 2018 – 10 August 2023
- Constituency: NA-92 (Sargodha-V)
- In office 2008 – June 2010
- Constituency: NA-68 (Sargodha-V)

Personal details
- Party: AP (2025-present)
- Other political affiliations: PMLN (2018-2025)

Syed Javed Hasnain Shah is a Pakistani politician who had been a member of the National Assembly of Pakistan from August 2018 to August 2023. Previously he was a member of the National Assembly from 2008 to June 2010.

== Political career ==
He was elected to the National Assembly of Pakistan as a candidate of Pakistan Muslim League (N) (PML-N) from Constituency NA-68 (Sargodha-V) in the 2008 general election. He received 80,174 votes and defeated Mian Mazhar Ahmed Qureshi, a candidate of Pakistan Muslim League (Q) (PML-Q).

In June 2010, the authenticity of his bachelor's degree was challenged in the Election Tribunal of the Lahore High Court. The election tribunal subsequently disqualified him as member of the National Assembly after the degree was proved bogus.

In December 2014, he was acquitted in fake degree case.

He was re-elected to the National Assembly as a candidate of PML-N from Constituency NA-92 (Sargodha-V) in the 2018 Pakistani general election.
