= Nahid Shahid Ali =

Pakistani politician

Member of the National Assembly of Pakistan
- In office 2008–2013

Personal details
- Born: Karachi, Sindh, Pakistan

Nahid Shahid Ali (Urdu: ناہید شاہد علی) is a Pakistani politician who served as member of the National Assembly of Pakistan.

== Political career ==
She was elected to the National Assembly of Pakistan as a candidate of Muttahida Qaumi Movement on a seat reserved for women from Sindh in the 2008 Pakistani general election.
