= Nosheen Saeed =

Member of the National Assembly of Pakistan
- In office 2008–2013

Personal details
- Born: 6 July 1958 (age 67)

Nosheen Saeed (Urdu: نوشین سعید; born 6 July 1958) is a Pakistani politician who served as member of the National Assembly of Pakistan.

== Early life ==
Saeed was born on 7 June 1958.

== Political career ==
She was elected to the National Assembly of Pakistan as a candidate of Pakistan Muslim League (Q) on a seat reserved for women from Punjab in the 2008 Pakistani general election.
