= Asghar Ali Jutt =

Pakistani politician

Member of the National Assembly of Pakistan
- In office 2008–2013
- Constituency: NA-167 (Vehari-I)

Asghar Ali Jutt is a Pakistani politician who had been a member of the National Assembly of Pakistan from 2008 to 2013.

== Political career ==
He was elected to the National Assembly of Pakistan from Constituency NA-167 (Vehari-I) as a candidate of Pakistan Peoples Party (PPP) in by-polls held in May 2010. He received 63,183 votes and defeated Nazir Ahmed Arain, a candidate of Awami Ittehad.

He ran for the seat of the National Assembly from Constituency NA-166 (Pakpattan-III) as an independent candidate in the 2013 Pakistani general election, but was unsuccessful. He received 30,941 votes and lost the seat to Rana Zahid Hussain.

== See also ==
- Politics of Pakistan
- List of political parties in Pakistan
