= Khurshid Begum Saeed =

Pakistani politician

Member of the National Assembly of Pakistan
- In office 2008–2013

Khurshid Begum Saeed (Urdu: خورشید بیگم سعید) is a Pakistani politician who served as member of the National Assembly of Pakistan.

== Political career ==
She was elected to the National Assembly of Pakistan as a candidate of Awami National Party on a seat reserved for women from Khyber Pakhtunkhwa in the 2008 Pakistani general election.

She ran for the seat of National Assembly as a candidate of Awami National Party from NA-14 constituency in the 2013 Pakistani general election but was unsuccessful.
