= Reena Kumari (politician) =

Member of the National Assembly of Pakistan
- In office 2008–2013

Reena Kumari (Urdu: رینا کماری) is a Pakistani politician who served as member of the National Assembly of Pakistan.

== Political career ==
She was elected to the National Assembly of Pakistan as a candidate of Pakistan Muslim League (F) on a seat reserved for women from Sindh in the 2008 Pakistani general election.
