= NA-138 Okara-IV =

Constituency of the National Assembly of Pakistan

- Constituency for the National Assembly of Pakistan
- Region: Depalpur Tehsil (partly) of Okara District
- Electorate: 521,359

Current constituency
- Party: Pakistan Muslim League (N)
- Member: Muhammad Moeen Wattoo
- Created from: NA-147 Okara-V

NA-138 Okara-IV (این اے-138، اوكاڑه-4) is a constituency for the National Assembly of Pakistan.

== Members of Parliament ==
=== 2018–2023: NA-144 (Okara-IV) ===
Election	Member	Party
2018	Muhammad Moeen Wattoo	PML (N)

=== 2024–present: NA-138 Okara-IV ===
Election	Member	Party
2024	Muhammad Moeen Wattoo	PML (N)

== Election 2002 ==
General elections were held on 10 October 2002. Rubina Shaheen Watoo of PML-J won by 70,744 votes.

General election 2002: NA-147 Okara-V
Party	Candidate	Votes	%	±%
PML(J)	Robina Shaheen Wattoo	70,774	54.70	
PML(Q)	Mian Muhammad Moain Khan Wattoo	50,040	38.67	
Others	Others (six candidates)	8,575	6.63	
Turnout		134,617	50.58	
Total valid votes		129,389	96.12	
Rejected ballots		5,228	3.88	
Majority		20,734	16.03	
Registered electors		266,142		

== Election 2008 ==
General elections were held on 18 February 2008. Manzoor Wattoo an independent candidate won by 84,778 votes.

General election 2008: NA-147 Okara-V
Party	Candidate	Votes	%	±%
Independent	Mian Manzoor Ahmad Khan Wattoo	84,778	60.64	
Independent	Syed Raza Ali Gillani	31,548	22.56	
PPP	Sardar Khyzar Hayat Khan Ladhu Ka	20,044	14.34	
Others	Others (six candidates)	3,443	2.46	
Turnout		145,867	45.50	
Total valid votes		139,813	95.85	
Rejected ballots		6,054	4.15	
Majority		53,230	38.08	
Registered electors		320,579		
Independent gain from PML(J)				

== By-Election 2008 ==
By-Election 2008: NA-147 Okara-V
Party	Candidate	Votes	%	±%
PPP	Khurram Jehangir Wattoo	79,195	82.53	
Independent	Muhammad Zafar Yasin Wattoo	15,965	16.64	
Others	Others (twelve candidates)	801	0.83	
Turnout		96,809	30.06	
Total valid votes		95,961	99.12	
Rejected ballots		848	0.88	
Majority		63,230	65.89	
Registered electors		322,087		
PPP gain from Independent				

== Election 2013 ==
General elections were held on 11 May 2013. Muhammad Moeen Wattoo of PML-N won by 87,266 votes and became the member of National Assembly.

General election 2013: NA-147 Okara-V
Party	Candidate	Votes	%	±%
PML(N)	Muhammad Moeen Wattoo	87,266	55.09	
PPP	Mian Manzoor Ahmad Khan Wattoo	58,234	36.76	
Others	Others (eight candidates)	12,904	8.15	
Turnout		163,747	61.88	
Total valid votes		158,404	96.74	
Rejected ballots		5,343	3.26	
Majority		29,032	18.33	
Registered electors		264,607		
PML(N) gain from independent politician				

== Election 2018 ==
General elections were held on 25 July 2018.

General election 2018: NA-144 Okara-IV
Party	Candidate	Votes	%	±%
PML(N)	Muhammad Moeen Wattoo	118,670	49.15	
PTI	Manzoor Wattoo	105,585	43.73	
Others	Others (eleven candidates)	17,208	7.12	
Turnout		248,021	57.42	
Total valid votes		241,463	97.36	
Rejected ballots		6,558	2.64	
Majority		13,085	5.42	
Registered electors		431,948		
PML(N) hold		Swing	N/A	

== Election 2024 ==
General elections were held on 8 February 2024. Muhammad Moeen Wattoo won the election with 122,775 votes.

General election 2024: NA-138 Okara-IV
Party	Candidate	Votes	%	±%
PML(N)	Muhammad Moeen Wattoo	122,775	43.46	▼5.69
PPP	Manzoor Wattoo	79,731	28.22	▼15.51
PTI	Arshad Ali (Note: Filed nomination papers as PTI candidate but ECP allowed him to run as an independent)	48,245	17.08	
Others	Others (seventeen candidates)	31,740	11.24	
Turnout		290,334	55.69	▼1.73
Total valid votes		282,491	97.30	
Rejected ballots		7,843	2.70	
Majority		43,044	15.24	▲9.82
Registered electors		521,359		
PML(N) hold		Swing	N/A	

== See also ==
- NA-137 Okara-III
- NA-139 Pakpattan-I
