= Constituency NA-257 =

Former constituency of the National Assembly of Pakistan

Constituency NA-257 (Karachi-XIX)
- Former constituency for the National Assembly of Pakistan
- Region: Karachi District

Former constituency
- Created: 2002
- Abolished: 2018
- Replaced by: NA-237 (Malir-II); NA-238 (Malir-III)

Constituency NA-257 (Karachi-XIX) (Urdu: ۱این اے-۲۵۷، کراچی-۹) was a constituency for the National Assembly of Pakistan. It mainly represented the Airport and Ibrahim Hyderi subdivisions of Malir District. After the 2018 delimitations, these areas have been included in NA-237 (Malir-II) and NA-238 (Malir-III) respectively.

== Election 2002 ==
General elections were held on 10 Oct 2002. Muhammad Shamim Siddiqui of Muttahida Qaumi Movement won by 45,480 votes.

General election 2002: NA-257 (Karachi-XIX)
Party	Candidate	Votes	%	±%
MQM	Muhammad Shamim Siddiqui	45,480	43.15	
MMA	Osama Razi	23,668	22.45	
PPP	Sardar Akhtar Hussain	17,168	16.29	
MQM-H	Qamar Niaz	6,433	6.10	
PAT	Mirza Yousuf Hussain	5,847	5.55	
PML(Q)	Rahim Adil Shaikh	2,627	2.49	
PML(N)	Fahim Riaz Siddiqui	2,056	1.95	
Others	Others (seven candidates)	2,134	2.02	
Turnout		107,043	41.73	
Total valid votes		105,413	98.48	
Rejected ballots		1,630	1.52	
Majority		21,812	20.70	
Registered electors		256,535		

== Election 2008 ==
General elections were held on 18 Feb 2008. Sajid Ahmed of Muttahida Qaumi Movement won by 134,498 votes.

General election 2008: NA-257 (Karachi-XIX)
Party	Candidate	Votes	%	±%
MQM	Sajid Anmed	134,498	72.35	
PPP	Riaz Hussain Lund Balouch	46,084	24.79	
PML(N)	Faheem	4,294	2.31	
Others	Others (four candidates)	1,025	0.55	
Turnout		185,907	48.12	
Total valid votes		185,901	99.99	
Rejected ballots		6	0.01	
Majority		88,414	47.56	
Registered electors		386,376		

== Election 2013 ==
General elections were held on 11 May 2013. Sajid Ahmed of Muttahida Qaumi Movement won by 125,405 votes and became the member of National Assembly.

General election 2013: NA-257 (Karachi-XIX)
Party	Candidate	Votes	%	±%
MQM	Sajid Anmed	125,405	64.27	
Independent	Farooq Khan	23,508	12.05	
PPP	Naseem Khan	13,459	6.90	
JI	Taufeequddin Siddiqui	10,410	5.34	
PML(N)	Zain Ansari	9,060	4.64	
Independent	Syed Hassan Jaffer Rizvi	6,257	3.21	
Independent	Shah Waliullah	4,349	2.23	
Others	Others (eleven candidates)	2,665	1.36	
Turnout		198,083	53.39	
Total valid votes		195,113	98.50	
Rejected ballots		2,970	1.50	
Majority		101,897	52.22	
Registered electors		371,013		
