= Constituency NA-147 =

Constituency NA-147 may refer to:

- NA-147 (Sahiwal-I), a constituency (after 2018 delimitation) that covers Sahiwal City
- NA-147 (Okara-V), a former constituency based on 2002 delimitation that covers Depalpur Rural areas
