= Shahnaz Saleem Malik =

Pakistani politician

Member of the National Assembly of Pakistan
- In office 13 August 2018 – 10 August 2023
- Constituency: Reserved seat for women
- In office 1 June 2013 – 31 May 2018
- Constituency: Reserved seat for women
- In office 17 March 2008 – 16 March 2013
- Constituency: Reserved seat for women

Personal details
- Born: January 13, 1956 (age 70) Dera Ghazi Khan District, Punjab Pakistan
- Party: PMLN (2002-present)

Shahnaz Salim Malik (Urdu: شہناز سلیم ملک) is a Pakistani politician who has thrice been a member of the National Assembly of Pakistan, from August 2018 to August 2023 and previously from 2008 to May 2018.

== Early life and education ==
She was born on 13 January 1956 in Dera Ghazi Khan.

She did Master of Arts in 1983 and also has a degree of Bachelor of Arts. She did Bachelor of Laws in 1994 from Bahauddin Zakariya University and was a practicing lawyer.

== Political career ==
She was elected to the Provincial Assembly of the Punjab as a candidate of Pakistan Muslim League (N) (PML-N) on a seat reserved for women in the 2002 Pakistani general election.

She was elected to the National Assembly of Pakistan as a candidate of PML-N on a seat reserved for women from Punjab in the 2008 Pakistani general election.

She was re-elected to the National Assembly as a candidate of PML-N on a reserved seat for women from Punjab in the 2013 Pakistani general election.

She was re-elected to the National Assembly as a candidate of PML-N on a seat reserved for women from Punjab in the 2018 Pakistani general election.
