= Constituency NA-126 =

Former constituency of the National Assembly of Pakistan

Constituency NA-126 (Lahore-IX)
- Former constituency for the National Assembly of Pakistan
- Region: Lahore District

Former constituency
- Created: 2002
- Abolished: 2018

Constituency NA-126 (Lahore-IX) (Urdu: این اے-١٢٦، لاهور- ۹) was a constituency for the National Assembly of Pakistan. After the 2018 delimitations, its areas have been divided among NA-130 (Lahore-VIII) and NA-135 (Lahore-XIII).

== Boundaries ==
NA-126 included the areas of Model Town, Gulberg, Makkah Colony, Naseerabad, Shah Kamal, Pakki Thatthi, Kashmir Block, Rehmanpura, Gulshan Iqbal, Ravi Block, Sikandar Block, Awan Town, Garden Town, Model Town, Township, Liberty, Ferozepur Road, Kalma Chowk, Faisal Town, Wafaqi Colony, Allama Iqbal Town, Wahdat Colony, Najaf Colony, Punjab University New Campus, Muslim Town and parts of Johar Town.

== Election 2002 ==
General elections were held on 10 Oct 2002. Liaqat Baloch of Muttahida Majlis-e-Amal won by 43,679 votes .

General election 2002: NA-126 Lahore-IX
Party	Candidate	Votes	%	±%
MMA	Liaqat Baloch	43,679	50.72	
PPP	Fakhar Zaman	14,107	16.38	
PML(Q)	Tariq Badruddian Bandey	13,838	16.07	
PTI	Dr. Shahid Siddique Khan	12,354	14.35	
Others	Others (six candidates)	2,139	2.48	
Turnout		87,523	32.26	
Total valid votes		86,117	98.39	
Rejected ballots		1,406	1.61	
Majority		29,572	34.34	
Registered electors		271,325		

== Election 2008 ==
General elections were held on 18 Feb 2008. Umar Sohail Zia Butt of PML-N won by 69,718 votes.

General election 2008: NA-126 Lahore-IX
Party	Candidate	Votes	%	±%
PML(N)	Umer Sohail Zia Butt	69,718	58.25	
PPP	Syed Hasnat Ahmed	25,056	20.94	
PML(Q)	Muhammad Idrees	23,657	19.77	
Others	Others (ten candidates)	1,253	1.04	
Turnout		120,840	33.54	
Total valid votes		119,684	99.04	
Rejected ballots		1,156	0.96	
Majority		44,662	37.31	
Registered electors		360,304		

== Election 2013 ==
General elections were held on 11 May 2013. Shafqat Mahmood of Pakistan tehreek insaf won by 97,785 votes and became the member of National Assembly.

General election 2013: NA-126 Lahore-IX
Party	Candidate	Votes	%	±%
PTI	Shafqat Mehmood	97,785	49.90	
PML(N)	Khawaja Ahmad Hassan	90,332	46.09	
JI	Liaqat Baloch	3,226	1.65	
PPP	Syed Zahid Bukhari	2,770	1.41	
Others	Others (fourteen candidates)	1,860	0.95	
Turnout		197,889	55.05	
Total valid votes		195,973	99.03	
Rejected ballots		1,916	0.97	
Majority		7,453	3.81	
Registered electors		359,492		
