= Constituency NA-266 =

National Assembly of Pakistan constituency

Constituency NA-266 (Nasirabad)
- Former constituency for the National Assembly of Pakistan
- Region: Nasirabad District

Former constituency
- Abolished: 2018
- Replaced by: NA-260 (Nasirabad-cum-Kachhi-cum-Jhal Magsi)

Constituency NA-266 (Nasirabad) (Urdu: این اے-۲۶۶، نصيرآباد) was a constituency for the National Assembly of Pakistan.

== Election 2002 ==
General elections were held on 10 Oct 2002. Zafarullah Khan Jamali of PML-Q won by 62,107 votes.

General election 2002: NA-266 Nasirabad-cum-Jaffarabad
Party	Candidate	Votes	%	±%
PML(Q)	Mir Zafarullah Knan Jamali	62,107	51.69	
PPP	Munawar Ali Khosa	41,899	34.87	
MMA	Dr. Hafeez-Ur-Rehman Khosa	7,344	6.11	
Jamote Qaumi Movement	Arz Muhammad Bhanger	6,240	5.19	
Others	Others (five candidates)	2,557	2.14	
Turnout		126,782	25.68	
Total valid votes		120,147	94.77	
Rejected ballots		6,635	5.23	
Majority		20,208	16.82	
Registered electors		493,722		

== Election 2008 ==
General elections were held on 18 Feb 2008. Mir Taj Muhammad Jamali of PPP won by 76,556 votes.

General election 2008: NA-266 Nasirabad-cum-Jaffarabad
Party	Candidate	Votes	%	±%
PPP	Taj Muhammad Jamali	76,556	52.50	
Independent	Mir Zahoor Hussain Khan Khoso	51,648	35.42	
PML(Q)	Abdul Rehman Khan Jamali	6,083	4.17	
Independent	Mitha Khan Jattak	3,027	2.11	
Others	Others (thirteen candidates)	8,495	5.80	
Turnout		152,123	23.36	
Total valid votes		145,809	95.85	
Rejected ballots		6,314	4.15	
Majority		24,908	17.08	
Registered electors		651,356		

== Election 2013 ==
General elections were held on 11 May 2013. Zafarullah Khan Jamali of PML-N won by 81,391 votes and became the member of National Assembly.

General election 2013: NA-266 Nasirabad-cum-Jaffarabad
Party	Candidate	Votes	%	±%
Independent	Zafarullah Khan Jamali	41,604	30.51	
Independent	Mir Saleem Ahmed Khosa	35,743	26.22	
PPP	Mir Changez Khan Jamali	17,404	12.77	
Jamote Qaumi Movement	Mir Abdul Maajid Abro	10,039	7.36	
Independent	Sardarzada Mir Bajjar Chakar Domki	8,408	6.17	
JUI (F)	Mohammad Abdullah Jatak	7,852	5.76	
NP	Dr. Abdul Hayee Baloch	3,875	2.84	
BNP (M)	Mir Abdul Ghafoor Mengal	2,685	1.97	
Others	Others (twenty six candidates)	8,735	6.40	
Turnout		161,907	39.52	
Total valid votes		136,345	84.21	
Rejected ballots		25,562	15.79	
Majority		5,861	4.29	
Registered electors		409,664		
