= Constituency NA-144 =

Constituency NA-144 may refer to:

- NA-144 (Okara-IV), a present constituency (after 2018 delimitation) that covers the entire Depalpur rural areas
- NA-144 (Okara-II), a former constituency based on 2002 delimitation that covered Okara City, Okara Cantonment and adjoining villages
