= Tariq Shabbir Khan Mayo =

Pakistani politician

Tariq Shabir Khan Mayo is a Pakistani politician who was elected to the National Assembly of Pakistan in 2010. Tariq took his seat for the Pakistan Peoples Party Parliamentarians in the NA-129 constituency of Lahore.
