= NA-271 (Kharan-cum-Panjgur) =

Former constituency of the National Assembly of Pakistan

- Former constituency for the National Assembly of Pakistan
- Region: Kharan District; Panjgur District

Former constituency
- Abolished: 2018
- Replaced by: NA-268 (Chagai-cum-Nushki-cum-Kharan); NA-270 (Panjgur-cum-Washuk-cum-Awaran)

NA-271 (Kharan-cum-Panjgur) (Urdu: این اے-١۲٧، خاران-پنجگور) was a constituency for the National Assembly of Pakistan. It discontinued in 2018 and was replaced by NA-268 (Chagai-cum-Nushki-cum-Kharan) and NA-270 (Panjgur-cum-Washuk-cum-Awaran). NA-271 areas from Kharan District were added to NA-268 while areas from Panjgur District were added to NA-270. Both of these constituencies were created in 2018.

== Election 2002 ==
General elections were held on 10 Oct 2002. Moulvi Rehmatullah of Muttahida Majlis-e-Amal won by 25,775 votes.

General election 2002: NA-271 (Kharan-cum-Panjgur)
Party	Candidate	Votes	%	±%
MMA	Rehmat Ullah	25,775	40.06	
BNM	Abdul Khaliq Baloch	21,913	34.06	
PPP	Sardar Fateh Muhammad Hassani	6,970	10.83	
NA	Amanullah Gichki	6,052	9.41	
PML(Q)	Abdullah	1,694	2.63	
Others	Others (two candidates)	1,930	3.01	
Turnout		68,012	34.19	
Total valid votes		64,334	94.59	
Rejected ballots		3,678	5.41	
Majority		3,862	6.00	
Registered electors		198,911		

== Election 2008 ==
General elections were held on 18 Feb 2008. Ahsan Ullah Raki an PML-Q won by 22,175 votes.

General election 2008: NA-271 (Kharan-cum-Panjgur)
Party	Candidate	Votes	%	±%
PML(Q)	Ahsan Ullah Raki	22,856	32.05	
Independent	Abdul Qadir Baloch	22,175	31.09	
BNP (A)	Mir Muhammad Shoaib Baloch	10,166	14.25	
MMA	Abdul Aziz Baloch	8,419	11.80	
PPP	Sabar Ali Baloch	6,510	9.13	
Others	Others (four candidates)	1,198	1.68	
Turnout		73,870	36.58	
Total valid votes		71,324	96.55	
Rejected ballots		2,546	3.45	
Majority		681	0.96	
Registered electors		201,952		

== Election 2013 ==
General elections were held on 11 May 2013. Lieutenant General (R) Abdul Qadir Baloch of PML-N won by 7,388 votes and became the member of National Assembly.

General election 2013: NA-271 (Kharan-cum-Panjgur)
Party	Candidate	Votes	%	±%
PML(N)	Abdul Qadir Baloch	7,388	24.27	
PPP	Ahsan Ullah Raki	6,170	20.27	
BNP (M)	Jahanzaib Baloch	3,637	11.95	
NP	Abdul Khaliq Baloch	3,467	11.39	
JUI (F)	Muhammad Azam Baloch	2,655	8.72	
BNP (A)	Muhammad Hanif Baloch	2,371	7.79	
Independent	Munir Ahmed	2,257	7.42	
Independent	Shabaz Khan	1,473	4.84	
Others	Others (four candidates)	1,020	3.35	
Turnout		31,821	20.12	
Total valid votes		30,438	95.65	
Rejected ballots		1,383	4.35	
Majority		1,218	4.00	
Registered electors		158,164		
