= Zil-e-Huma (Balochistan politician) =

Pakistani politician

Member of the National Assembly of Pakistan
- In office 2008–2013

Zil-e-Huma (Urdu: ظل ہما) is a Pakistani politician who served as member of the National Assembly of Pakistan.

== Political career ==
She was elected to the National Assembly of Pakistan as a candidate of Pakistan Peoples Party on a seat reserved for women from Balochistan in the 2008 Pakistani general election. During her tenure as Member of the National Assembly, she served as federal Parliamentary Secretary for Women Development before being appointed as federal Parliamentary Secretary for the Economic Affairs in June 2011.
