= Constituency NA-263 =

Former constituency of the National Assembly of Pakistan

Constituency NA-263 (Loralai)
- Former constituency for the National Assembly of Pakistan
- Region: Karachi District

Former constituency
- Abolished: 2018
- Replaced by: NA-258 (Loralai-cum-Musakhel-cum-Ziarat-cum-Duki-cum-Harnai)

Constituency NA-263 (Loralai) (Urdu: این اے-۲۶۳، لورالۍ) was a constituency for the National Assembly of Pakistan.

== Election 2002 ==
General elections were held on 10 Oct 2002. Sardar Yaqoob Khan Nasir of PML-N won by 21,385 votes.

General election 2002: NA-263 (Loralai-cum-Musakhel-cum-Barkhan)
Party	Candidate	Votes	%	±%
PML(N)	Sardar Yaqoob Khan Nasir	21,385	27.19	
MMA	Amir Zaman Bukhari	19,218	24.43	
PPP	Sardar Mir Baz Muhammad Khan Khethran	14,877	18.91	
Independent	Sardar Sikandar Hayat Khan Jogezai	13,228	16.82	
PML(Q)	Mir Tariq Mehmood Khan Khetran	7,253	9.22	
Others	Others (five candidates)	2,696	3.43	
Turnout		81,744	30.00	
Total valid votes		78,657	96.22	
Rejected ballots		3,087	3.78	
Majority		2,167	2.76	
Registered electors		272,509		

== Election 2008 ==
General elections were held on 18 Feb 2008. Sardar Muhammad Israr Tareen of PML-Q won by 52,818 votes.

General election 2008: NA-263 (Loralai-cum-Musakhel-cum-Barkhan)
Party	Candidate	Votes	%	±%
PML(Q)	Sardar Muhammad Israr Tareen	52,818	38.34	
PML(N)	Sardar Muhammad Yaqoob Khan Nasir	34,985	25.40	
PPP	Sardar Mir Baz Muhammad Khan Khethran	30,233	21.95	
MMA	Faizullah	14,987	10.88	
Others	Others (seven candidates)	4,739	3.43	
Turnout		142,167	40.67	
Total valid votes		137,762	96.90	
Rejected ballots		4,405	3.10	
Majority		17,838	12.94	
Registered electors		349,596		

== Election 2013 ==
General elections were held on 11 May 2013. Molana Ameer Zaman of JUI-F won by 31,031 votes and became the member of National Assembly.

General election 2013: NA-263 (Loralai-cum-Musakhel-cum-Barkhan)
Party	Candidate	Votes	%	±%
JUI (F)	Ameer Zaman	31,031	29.31	
PML(N)	Sardar Muhammad Yaqoob Khan Nasir	23,374	22.08	
PPP	Sardar Mir Baz Muhammad Khan Khethran	22,147	20.92	
PMAP	Akhtar Shah Kudezai	11,042	10.43	
Independent	Sikandar Hayat Khan Jogezai	3,770	3.56	
BNP (M)	Wadera Gulzar Khan	3,601	3.40	
PTI	Muhammad Dawood Khan	3,227	3.05	
JUINP	Abdul Qadir Luni	2,920	2.76	
Others	Others (fourteen candidates)	4,768	4.49	
Turnout		113,134	52.79	
Total valid votes		105,880	93.59	
Rejected ballots		7,254	6.41	
Majority		7,657	7.23	
Registered electors		214,322		
