= NA-265 Pishin =

Constituency of the National Assembly of Pakistan

- Constituency for the National Assembly of Pakistan
- Region: Pishin District
- Electorate: 315,399

Current constituency
- Created: 2022
- Party: Jamiat Ulema-e-Islam (F)
- Member: Fazal-ur-Rehman
- Created from: NA-258 (Pishin); NA-262 (Pishin)

NA-265 Pishin (این اے-265،پشین) is a newly created constituency for the National Assembly of Pakistan. It comprises the district of Pishin from the province of Balochistan.

== Balochistan Assembly Constituencies ==
This constituency includes these subsequent Balochistan Assembly constituencies under it.

Constituency number	Constituency	District	Current MPA	Party
47	PB-47 Pishin-I	Pishin	Asfand Yar Khan Kakar	PPP
48	PB-48 Pishin-II	Pishin	Asghar Ali Tareen	JUI(F)
49	PB-49 Pishin-III	Pishin	Syed Zafar Ali Agha	JUI(F)

== Members of Parliament ==
=== 2018–2022: NA-262 Pishin ===
Election	Member	Party
2018	Kamal Uddin	MMA

=== 2024–present: NA-265 Pishin ===
Election	Member	Party
2024	Fazal-ur-Rehman	JUI(F)

== Election 2002 ==
General election 2002: NA-261 Pishin-Ziarat
Party	Candidate	Votes	%	±%
MMA	Gul Muhammad Dummar	37,022	52.13	
PMAP	Dr. Kaleemullah Khan	17,599	24.78	
PML(Q)	Khalid Khan Kakar	12,914	18.19	
ANP	Nizamuddin Kakar	1,162	1.64	
Others	Others (eight candidates)	2,319	3.26	
Turnout		75,061	27.72	
Total valid votes		71,016	94.61	
Rejected ballots		4,045	5.39	
Majority		19,423	27.35	
Registered electors		270,777		

== Election 2008 ==
General election 2008: NA-261 Pishin-Ziarat
Party	Candidate	Votes	%	±%
MMA	Agha Muhammad	30,611	37.41	
PML(Q)	Muhammad Samar Khan Kakar	23,350	28.54	
Independent	Syed Muhammad Fazal Agha	10,385	12.69	
Independent	Dr. Taj Muhammad	5,231	6.39	
PPP	Muhammad Yaqoob Ziaratwal	4,178	5.11	
ANP	Abdul Rasheed Nasir	2,355	2.88	
PML(N)	Akhundzada Badruddin	1,980	2.42	
Independent	Syed Fazal Muhammad Agha	1,220	1.49	
Others	Others (nine candidates)	2,510	3.07	
Turnout		85,011	28.57	
Total valid votes		81,820	96.25	
Rejected ballots		3,191	3.75	
Majority		7,261	8.87	
Registered electors		297,591		

== Election 2013 ==
General election 2013: NA-261 Pishin-Ziarat
Party	Candidate	Votes	%	±%
JUI (F)	Agha Muhammad	48,712	36.79	
PMAP	Muhammad Essa Roshan	48,188	36.40	
JUINP	Malik Abdul Qayum Kakar	24,679	18.64	
ANP	Nizamuddin Kakar	4,274	3.23	
PTI	Nawab Khan Dumer	2,920	2.21	
Others	Others (twelve candidates)	3,629	2.73	
Turnout		136,313	54.93	
Total valid votes		132,402	97.13	
Rejected ballots		3,911	2.87	
Majority		524	0.39	
Registered electors		248,179		

== Election 2018 ==
General elections were held on 25 July 2018.

General election 2018: NA-262 Pishin
Party	Candidate	Votes	%	±%
MMA	Kamal Uddin	50,258	42.83	
PMAP	Muhammad Isa Khan	28,344	24.16	
BAP	Gohar Ijaz Khan Kakar	13,387	11.41	
PPP	Malik Abdul Qayyum Kakar	10,297	8.78	
ANP	Nizamuddin	6,489	5.53	
PTI	Muhammad Hashim Khan Panezai	4,848	4.13	
Others	Others (nine candidates)	3,713	3.16	
Turnout		121,772	47.87	
Total valid votes		117,336	96.36	
Rejected ballots		4,436	3.64	
Majority		21,914	18.67	
Registered electors		254,366		
MMA^{†} hold		Swing	N/A	

^{†}JUI-F contested as part of MMA

== Election 2024 ==
General elections were held on 8 February 2024. Fazal-ur-Rehman won the election with 52,436 votes.

General election 2024: NA-265 Pishin
Party	Candidate	Votes	%	±%
JUI (F)	Fazal-ur-Rehman	52,436	42.16	▼0.67
PNAP	Khushal Khan Kakar	31,438	25.28	N/A
PTI	Syed Zahoor Ahmad Agha (Note: Filed nomination papers as PTI candidate but ECP allowed him to run as an Independent)	21,573	17.34	▲13.21
Others	Others (nine candidates)	18,931	15.22	
Turnout		129,019	40.91	▼6.96
Total valid votes		124,378	96.40	
Rejected ballots		4,641	3.60	
Majority		20,998	16.88	▼1.79
Registered electors		315,399		
JUI (F) gain from PNAP				

== See also ==
- NA-264 Quetta-III
- NA-266 Killa Abdullah-cum-Chaman
