= List of members of the 15th National Assembly of Pakistan =

Members of the National Assembly of Pakistan (2018–2023)

15th National Assembly
←	14th National Assembly	16th National Assembly	→
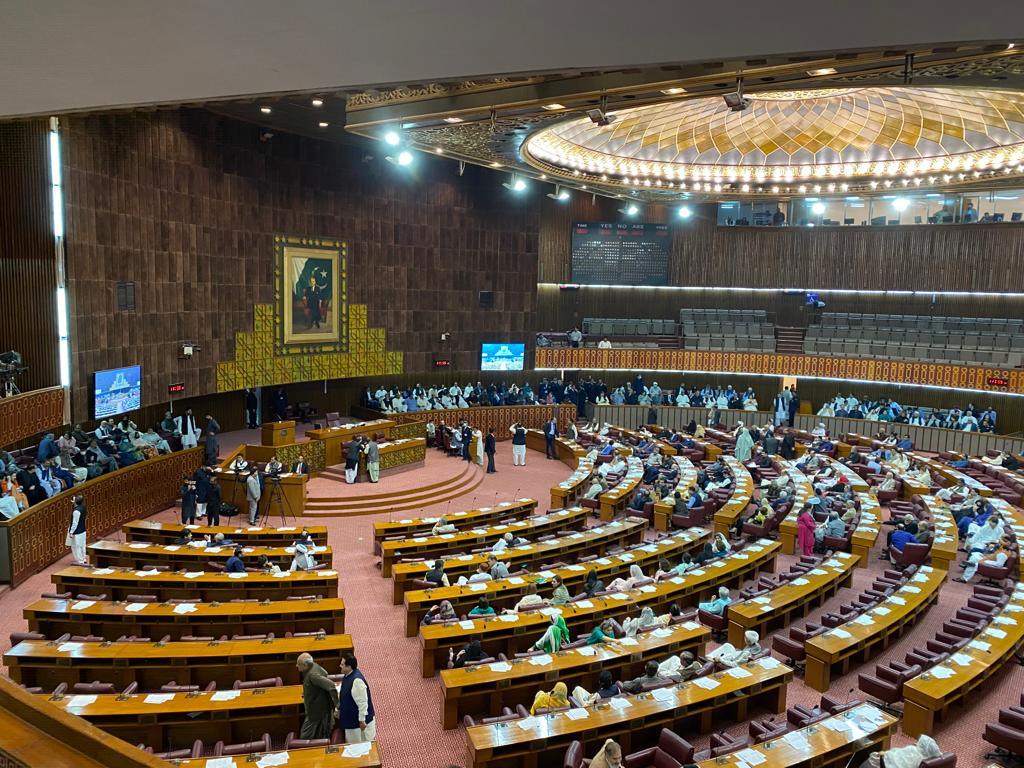

Overview
- Legislative body: National Assembly of Pakistan
- Jurisdiction: Pakistan
- Meeting place: Parliament House, Islamabad-44030
- Term: 2018 – 2023
- Election: 2018 Pakistani general election
- Government: Government of Pakistan
- Website: Official website

National Assembly of Pakistan
- Members: 342
- Speaker: Ayaz Sadiq; Asad Qaiser; Raja Pervaiz Ashraf
- Prime Minister: Imran Khan; Shehbaz Sharif
- Leader of the Opposition: Shehbaz Sharif; Raja Riaz
- President: Mamnoon Hussain; Arif Alvi

15th National Assembly of Pakistan
Party	Seats	Party	Seats
PTI	157	PML (Q)	5
PML(N)	84	GDA	3
PPP	54	ANP	1
MMA	16	AML	1
MQM-P	7	JWP	1
BAP	5	Independents	4
BNP (M)	4	Total = 342	

The 15th National Assembly of Pakistan was the legislature of Pakistan following the 2018 general election of members of parliament (MPs) to the National Assembly of Pakistan, the lower house of the bicameral Parliament of Pakistan. The National Assembly is a democratically elected body which consisted of 342 members during the 2018–2023 tenure, the members are referred to as Members of the National Assembly (MNAs), of which 272 were directly elected members; 70 reserved seats for women and religious minorities were allocated to the political parties according to their proportion of the total vote.

Elections for 270 directly-elected seats in the National Assembly took place on 25 July 2018. The elections for the remaining two directly electable seats were postponed. As a result of the election, the Pakistan Tehreek-e-Insaf (PTI) became the single largest party, though without an overall majority. PTI won 149 seats in the National Assembly. Pakistan Muslim League (N) (PML-N) and Pakistan Peoples Party (PPP) secured 82 and 53 seats, respectively. Following the election, nine independent candidates joined PTI. Members of the 15th National Assembly took an oath on 13 August 2018, and marked the constitutional transition of power from one democratically-elected government to another for the second time in the history of Pakistan. It marked the constitutional transition of power from one democratically-elected government in Pakistan to another for the first time following the 2013 general election. Asad Qaiser and Qasim Khan Suri of PTI were elected as the legislature's speaker and deputy speaker, respectively. On 17 August 2018, Imran Khan of PTI secured 176 votes and was elected the new Prime Minister of Pakistan for the first time, with the support of allied parties. Shahbaz Shareef won a PML-N leadership vote to succeed Syed Khurshid Ahmed Shah as permanent Leader of the Opposition in the National Assembly.

On 14 October 2018, by-election were held on 11 National Assembly seats. PTI and PML-N won four seats, each. Two were bagged by PML-Q and one seat was won by MMA. On 3 April 2022, in an address to the nation, Prime Minister Imran Khan announced that he has advised President Arif Alvi to dissolve the assemblies. Hence, on the same day, the President dissolved the National Assembly on the Prime Minister's advice under Article 58 of the Constitution. Earlier in the day, National Assembly Deputy Speaker Qasim Khan Suri dismissed the no-confidence motion against Imran Khan, terming it against Article 5 of the Constitution. On 7 April 2022, the Supreme Court of Pakistan ruled that the dismissal of the no-confidence motion by the deputy speaker and the subsequent dissolution of the National Assembly as unconstitutional and thus restored the assembly. After the no-confidence motion succeeded in ousting Khan from prime ministership, 123 MNAs of the PTI resigned from the assembly on 14 April 2022 as directed by Khan using a mass printed letterhead instead of individually written letters of resignation by all individual members, a few members resigned on 10 April 2022 a day after no-confidence motion. Their resignations were accepted in phases on 17, 20 and 25 January 2023.

The 15th National Assembly was dissolved on 9 August 2023.

== Members ==
Region	Constituency	Political party	Member	Assumed office	Term duration	Ref.
Khyber Pakhtunkhwa	NA-1 (Chitral)	Muttahida Majlis-e-Amal	Abdul Akbar Chitrali	13 August 2018		
Khyber Pakhtunkhwa	NA-2 (Swat-I)	Pakistan Tehreek-e-Insaf	Haider Ali Khan	13 August 2018		
Khyber Pakhtunkhwa	NA-3 (Swat-II)	Pakistan Tehreek-e-Insaf	Salim Rehman	13 August 2018		
Khyber Pakhtunkhwa	NA-4 (Swat-III)	Pakistan Tehreek-e-Insaf	Murad Saeed	13 August 2018	Resigned (10 April 2022)	
Khyber Pakhtunkhwa	NA-5 (Upper Dir)	Pakistan Tehreek-e-Insaf	Sahibzada Sibghatullah	13 August 2018		
Khyber Pakhtunkhwa	NA-6 (Lower Dir-I)	Pakistan Tehreek-e-Insaf	Mehboob Shah	13 August 2018		
Khyber Pakhtunkhwa	NA-7 (Lower Dir-II)	Pakistan Tehreek-e-Insaf	Muhammad Bashir Khan	13 August 2018		
Khyber Pakhtunkhwa	NA-8 (Malakand Protected Area)	Pakistan Tehreek-e-Insaf	Junaid Akbar	13 August 2018		
Khyber Pakhtunkhwa	NA-9 (Buner)	Pakistan Tehreek-e-Insaf	Sher Akbar Khan	13 August 2018		
Khyber Pakhtunkhwa	NA-10 (Shangla)	Pakistan Muslim League (N)	Ibadullah Khan	13 August 2018		
Khyber Pakhtunkhwa	NA-11 (Kohistan-cum-Lower Kohistan-cum-Kolai Palas Kohistan)	Muttahida Majlis-e-Amal	Afreen Khan	13 August 2018		
Khyber Pakhtunkhwa	NA-12 (Battagram)	Pakistan Tehreek-e-Insaf	Muhammad Nawaz Allai	13 August 2018		
Khyber Pakhtunkhwa	NA-13 (Mansehra-I)	Pakistan Tehreek-e-Insaf	Saleh Muhammad	13 August 2018		
Khyber Pakhtunkhwa	NA-14 (Mansehra-cum-Torghar)	Pakistan Muslim League (N)	Muhammad Sajjad Awan	13 August 2018		
Khyber Pakhtunkhwa	NA-15 (Abbottabad-I)	Pakistan Muslim League (N)	Murtaza Javed Abbasi	13 August 2018		
Khyber Pakhtunkhwa	NA-16 (Abbottabad-II)	Pakistan Tehreek-e-Insaf	Ali Khan Jadoon	13 August 2018		
Khyber Pakhtunkhwa	NA-17 (Haripur)	Pakistan Tehreek-e-Insaf	Omar Ayub	13 August 2018	Resigned (10 April 2022)	
Khyber Pakhtunkhwa	NA-18 (Swabi-I)	Pakistan Tehreek-e-Insaf	Asad Qaiser	13 August 2018	Resigned (10 April 2022)	
Khyber Pakhtunkhwa	NA-19 (Swabi-II)	Pakistan Tehreek-e-Insaf	Usman Khan Tarrakai	13 August 2018		
Khyber Pakhtunkhwa	NA-20 (Mardan-I)	Pakistan Tehreek-e-Insaf	Mujahid Ali	13 August 2018		
Khyber Pakhtunkhwa	NA-21 (Mardan-II)	Awami National Party	Ameer Haider Khan Hoti	13 August 2018		
Khyber Pakhtunkhwa	NA-22 (Mardan-III)	Pakistan Tehreek-e-Insaf	Ali Muhammad Khan	13 August 2018	Resigned (10 April 2022)	
Khyber Pakhtunkhwa	NA-23 (Charsadda-I)	Pakistan Tehreek-e-Insaf	Malik Anwar Taj	13 August 2018		
Khyber Pakhtunkhwa	NA-24 (Charsadda-II)	Pakistan Tehreek-e-Insaf	Fazal Muhammad Khan	13 August 2018		
Khyber Pakhtunkhwa	NA-25 (Nowshera-I)	Pakistan Tehreek-e-Insaf	Pervez Khattak	13 August 2018	Resigned (10 April 2022)	
Khyber Pakhtunkhwa	NA-26 (Nowshera-II)	Pakistan Tehreek-e-Insaf	Imran Khattak	13 August 2018		
Khyber Pakhtunkhwa	NA-27 (Peshawar-I)	Pakistan Tehreek-e-Insaf	Noor Alam Khan	13 August 2018		
Khyber Pakhtunkhwa	NA-28 (Peshawar-II)	Pakistan Tehreek-e-Insaf	Arbab Amir Ayub	13 August 2018		
Khyber Pakhtunkhwa	NA-29 (Peshawar-III)	Pakistan Tehreek-e-Insaf	Nasir Khan Yousafzai	13 August 2018		
Khyber Pakhtunkhwa	NA-30 (Peshawar-IV)	Pakistan Tehreek-e-Insaf	Sher Ali Arbab	13 August 2018		
Khyber Pakhtunkhwa	NA-31 (Peshawar-V)	Pakistan Tehreek-e-Insaf	Shokat Ali	13 August 2018		
Khyber Pakhtunkhwa	NA-32 (Kohat)	Pakistan Tehreek-e-Insaf	Shehryar Khan Afridi	13 August 2018	Resigned (10 April 2022)	
Khyber Pakhtunkhwa	NA-33 (Hangu)	Pakistan Tehreek-e-Insaf	Khayal Zaman Orakzai	13 August 2018		
Khyber Pakhtunkhwa	NA-34 (Karak)	Pakistan Tehreek-e-Insaf	Shahid Ahmed Khattak	13 August 2018		
Khyber Pakhtunkhwa	NA-35 (Bannu)	Muttahida Majlis-e-Amal	Zahid Akram Durrani	29 October 2018		
Khyber Pakhtunkhwa	NA-36 (Lakki Marwat)	Muttahida Majlis-e-Amal	Mohammad Anwar Khan	13 August 2018		
Khyber Pakhtunkhwa	NA-37 (Tank)	Muttahida Majlis-e-Amal	Asad Mehmood	13 August 2018		
Khyber Pakhtunkhwa	NA-38 (Dera Ismail Khan-I)	Pakistan Tehreek-e-Insaf	Ali Amin Gandapur	13 August 2018	Resigned (10 April 2022)	
Khyber Pakhtunkhwa	NA-39 (Dera Ismail Khan-II)	Pakistan Tehreek-e-Insaf	Muhammad Yaqoob Sheikh	13 August 2018		
Khyber Pakhtunkhwa	NA-40 (Tribal Area-I)	Pakistan Tehreek-e-Insaf	Gul Dad Khan	13 August 2018		
Khyber Pakhtunkhwa	NA-41 (Tribal Area-II)	Pakistan Tehreek-e-Insaf	Gul Zafar Khan	13 August 2018		
Khyber Pakhtunkhwa	NA-42 (Tribal Area-III)	Pakistan Tehreek-e-Insaf	Sajid Khan	13 August 2018		
Khyber Pakhtunkhwa	NA-43 (Tribal Area-IV)	Pakistan Tehreek-e-Insaf	Noor-ul-Haq Qadri	13 August 2018	Resigned (10 April 2022)	
Khyber Pakhtunkhwa	NA-44 (Tribal Area-V)	Pakistan Tehreek-e-Insaf	Mohammed Iqbal Khan	13 August 2018		
Khyber Pakhtunkhwa	NA-45 (Tribal Area-VI)	Muttahida Majlis-e-Amal	Munir Khan Orakzai	13 August 2018		
Khyber Pakhtunkhwa	NA-46 (Tribal Area-VII)	Pakistan Peoples Party	Sajid Hussain	13 August 2018		
Khyber Pakhtunkhwa	NA-47 (Tribal Area-VIII)	Pakistan Tehreek-e-Insaf	Jawad Hussain	13 August 2018		
Khyber Pakhtunkhwa	NA-48 (Tribal Area-IX)	Independent	Mohsin Dawar	13 August 2018		
Khyber Pakhtunkhwa	NA-49 (Tribal Area-X)	Muttahida Majlis-e-Amal	Muhammad Jamal ud Din	13 August 2018		
Khyber Pakhtunkhwa	NA-50 (Tribal Area-XI)	Independent	Muhammad Ali	13 August 2018		
Khyber Pakhtunkhwa	NA-51 (Tribal Area-XII)	Muttahida Majlis-e-Amal	Abdul Shakoor	13 August 2018		
Islamabad Capital Territory	NA-52 (Islamabad-I)	Pakistan Tehreek-e-Insaf	Khurram Shehzad Nawaz	13 August 2018		
Islamabad Capital Territory	NA-53 (Islamabad-II)	Pakistan Tehreek-e-Insaf	Ali Nawaz Awan	29 October 2018	Resigned (10 April 2022)	
Islamabad Capital Territory	NA-54 (Islamabad-III)	Pakistan Tehreek-e-Insaf	Asad Umar	13 August 2018	Resigned (10 April 2022)	
Punjab	NA-55 (Attock-I)	Pakistan Tehreek-e-Insaf	Tahir Sadiq	13 August 2018		
Punjab	NA-56 (Attock-II)	Pakistan Muslim League (N)	Malik Sohail Khan	29 October 2018		
Punjab	NA-57 (Rawalpindi-I)	Pakistan Tehreek-e-Insaf	Sadaqat Ali Abbasi	13 August 2018	Resigned (10 April 2022)	
Punjab	NA-58 (Rawalpindi-II)	Pakistan Peoples Party	Raja Pervaiz Ashraf	13 August 2018		
Punjab	NA-59 (Rawalpindi-III)	Pakistan Tehreek-e-Insaf	Ghulam Sarwar Khan	13 August 2018	Resigned (10 April 2022)	
Punjab	NA-60 (Rawalpindi-IV)	Pakistan Tehreek-e-Insaf	Sheikh Rashid Shafique	29 October 2018		
Punjab	NA-61 (Rawalpindi-V)	Pakistan Tehreek-e-Insaf	Aamir Mehmood Kiani	13 August 2018	Resigned (10 April 2022)	
Punjab	NA-62 (Rawalpindi-VI)	Awami Muslim League (Pakistan)	Sheikh Rasheed Ahmad	13 August 2018	Resigned (10 April 2022)	
Punjab	NA-63 (Rawalpindi-VII)	Pakistan Tehreek-e-Insaf	Mansoor Hayat Khan	29 October 2018		
Punjab	NA-64 (Chakwal-I)	Pakistan Tehreek-e-Insaf	Sardar Zulfiqar Ali Khan Dullah	13 August 2018		
Punjab	NA-65 (Chakwal-II)	Pakistan Muslim League (Q)	Chaudhry Salik Hussain	29 October 2018		
Punjab	NA-66 (Jhelum-I)	Pakistan Tehreek-e-Insaf	Chaudhry Farrukh Altaf	13 August 2018		
Punjab	NA-67 (Jhelum-II)	Pakistan Tehreek-e-Insaf	Fawad Chaudhry	13 August 2018	Resigned (10 April 2022)	
Punjab	NA-68 (Gujrat-I)	Pakistan Muslim League (Q)	Chaudhry Hussain Elahi	13 August 2018		
Punjab	NA-69 (Gujrat-II)	Pakistan Muslim League (Q)	Moonis Elahi	29 October 2018	Resigned (10 April 2022)	
Punjab	NA-70 (Gujrat-III)	Pakistan Tehreek-e-Insaf	Syed Faizul Hassan Shah	13 August 2018		
Punjab	NA-71 (Gujrat-IV)	Pakistan Muslim League (N)	Chaudhry Abid Raza	13 August 2018		
Punjab	NA-72 (Sialkot-I)	Pakistan Muslim League (N)	Armaghan Subhani	13 August 2018		
Punjab	NA-73 (Sialkot-II)	Pakistan Muslim League (N)	Khawaja Asif	13 August 2018		
Punjab	NA-74 (Sialkot-III)	Pakistan Muslim League (N)	Ali Zahid	13 August 2018		
Punjab	NA-75 (Sialkot-IV)	Pakistan Muslim League (N)	Syed Iftikhar Ul Hassan	13 August 2018		
Punjab	NA-76 (Sialkot-V)	Pakistan Muslim League (N)	Shamim Ahmed	13 August 2018		
Punjab	NA-77 (Narowal-I)	Pakistan Muslim League (N)	Mehnaz Aziz	13 August 2018		
Punjab	NA-78 (Narowal-II)	Pakistan Muslim League (N)	Ahsan Iqbal	13 August 2018		
Punjab	NA-79 (Gujranwala-I)	Pakistan Muslim League (N)	Nisar Ahmed Cheema	13 August 2018		
Punjab	NA-80 (Gujranwala-II)	Pakistan Muslim League (N)	Chaudhry Mehmood Bashir	13 August 2018		
Punjab	NA-81 (Gujranwala-III)	Pakistan Muslim League (N)	Khurram Dastgir Khan	13 August 2018		
Punjab	NA-82 (Gujranwala-IV)	Pakistan Muslim League (N)	Usman Ibrahim	15 August 2018		
Punjab	NA-83 (Gujranwala-V)	Pakistan Muslim League (N)	Chaudhary Zulfiqar Bhindar	13 August 2018		
Punjab	NA-84 (Gujranwala-VI)	Pakistan Muslim League (N)	Azhar Qayyum	13 August 2018		
Punjab	NA-85 (Mandi Bahauddin-I)	Pakistan Tehreek-e-Insaf	Chaudhry Imtiaz Ahmed Ranjha	13 August 2018		
Punjab	NA-86 (Mandi Bahauddin-II)	Pakistan Muslim League (N)	Nasir Iqbal Bosal	13 August 2018		
Punjab	NA-87 (Hafizabad)	Pakistan Tehreek-e-Insaf	Chaudhary Shoukat Ali	13 August 2018		
Punjab	NA-88 (Sargodha-I)	Pakistan Muslim League (N)	Mukhtar Ahmad Bharath	13 August 2018		
Punjab	NA-89 (Sargodha-II)	Pakistan Muslim League (N)	Mohsin Shahnawaz Ranjha	13 August 2018		
Punjab	NA-90 (Sargodha-III)	Pakistan Muslim League (N)	Chaudhry Hamid Hameed	13 August 2018		
Punjab	NA-91 (Sargodha-IV)	Pakistan Tehreek-e-Insaf	Chaudhry Aamir Sultan Cheema	2 February 2019		
Punjab	NA-92 (Sargodha-V)	Pakistan Muslim League (N)	Syed Javed Hasnain Shah	13 August 2018		
Punjab	NA-93 (Khushab-I)	Pakistan Tehreek-e-Insaf	Umer Aslam Awan	13 August 2018		
Punjab	NA-94 (Khushab-II)	Pakistan Tehreek-e-Insaf	Malik Muhammad Ehsanullah Tiwana	13 August 2018		
Punjab	NA-95 (Mianwali-I)	Pakistan Tehreek-e-Insaf	Imran Khan	13 August 2018	21 October 2022	
Punjab	NA-96 (Mianwali-II)	Pakistan Tehreek-e-Insaf	Amjad Ali Khan	13 August 2018		
Punjab	NA-97 (Bhakkar-I)	Pakistan Tehreek-e-Insaf	Sana Ullah Khan	13 August 2018		
Punjab	NA-98 (Bhakkar-II)	Pakistan Tehreek-e-Insaf	Mohammad Afzal Khan	13 August 2018		
Punjab	NA-99 (Chiniot-I)	Pakistan Tehreek-e-Insaf	Ghulam Muhammad Lali	13 August 2018		
Punjab	NA-100 (Chiniot-II)	Pakistan Muslim League (N)	Qaiser Ahmed Sheikh	13 August 2018		
Punjab	NA-101 (Faisalabad-I)	Pakistan Tehreek-e-Insaf	Muhammad Asim Nazir	13 August 2018		
Punjab	NA-102 (Faisalabad-II)	Pakistan Tehreek-e-Insaf	Malik Nawab Sher Waseer	13 August 2018		
Punjab	NA-103 (Faisalabad-III)	Pakistan Muslim League (N)	Ali Gohar Khan	29 October 2018		
Punjab	NA-104 (Faisalabad-IV)	Pakistan Muslim League (N)	Chaudhry Shehbaz Babar	13 August 2018		
Punjab	NA-105 (Faisalabad-V)	Pakistan Tehreek-e-Insaf	Chaudhry Raza Nasrullah Ghumman	13 August 2018		
Punjab	NA-106 (Faisalabad-VI)	Pakistan Muslim League (N)	Rana Sanaullah	13 August 2018		
Punjab	NA-107 (Faisalabad-VII)	Pakistan Tehreek-e-Insaf	Khurram Shehzad	13 August 2018		
Punjab	NA-108 (Faisalabad-VIII)	Pakistan Tehreek-e-Insaf	Farrukh Habib	13 August 2018	Resigned (10 April 2022)	
Punjab	NA-109 (Faisalabad-IX)	Pakistan Tehreek-e-Insaf	Faiz Ullah Kamoka	13 August 2018		
Punjab	NA-110 (Faisalabad-X)	Pakistan Tehreek-e-Insaf	Raja Riaz Ahmad Khan	13 August 2018		
Punjab	NA-111 (Toba Tek Singh-I)	Pakistan Muslim League (N)	Chaudhary Khalid Javed	13 August 2018		
Punjab	NA-112 (Toba Tek Singh-II)	Pakistan Muslim League (N)	Muhammad Junaid Anwar Chaudhry	13 August 2018		
Punjab	NA-113 (Toba Tek Singh-III)	Pakistan Tehreek-e-Insaf	Riaz Fatyana	13 August 2018		
Punjab	NA-114 (Jhang-I)	Pakistan Tehreek-e-Insaf	Sahabzada Muhammad Mehboob Sultan	15 August 2018		
Punjab	NA-115 (Jhang-II)	Pakistan Tehreek-e-Insaf	Ghulam Bibi Bharwana	13 August 2018		
Punjab	NA-116 (Jhang-III)	Pakistan Tehreek-e-Insaf	Muhammad Ameer Sultan	15 August 2018		
Punjab	NA-117 (Nankana Sahib-I)	Pakistan Muslim League (N)	Barjees Tahir	13 August 2018		
Punjab	NA-118 (Nankana Sahib-II)	Pakistan Tehreek-e-Insaf	Ijaz Shah	13 August 2018	Resigned (10 April 2022)	
Punjab	NA-119 (Sheikhupura-I)	Pakistan Tehreek-e-Insaf	Rahat Amanullah	13 August 2018		
Punjab	NA-120 (Sheikhupura-II)	Pakistan Muslim League (N)	Rana Tanveer Hussain	13 August 2018		
Punjab	NA-121 (Sheikhupura-III)	Pakistan Muslim League (N)	Mian Javed Latif	13 August 2018		
Punjab	NA-122 (Sheikhupura-IV)	Pakistan Muslim League (N)	Irfan Dogar	13 August 2018		
Punjab	NA-123 (Lahore-I)	Pakistan Muslim League (N)	Muhammad Riaz Malik	13 August 2018		
Punjab	NA-124 (Lahore-II)	Pakistan Muslim League (N)	Shahid Khaqan Abbasi	1 November 2018		
Punjab	NA-125 (Lahore-III)	Pakistan Muslim League (N)	Waheed Alam Khan	13 August 2018		
Punjab	NA-126 (Lahore-IV)	Pakistan Tehreek-e-Insaf	Hammad Azhar	13 August 2018	Resigned (10 April 2022)	
Punjab	NA-127 (Lahore-V)	Pakistan Muslim League (N)	Ali Pervaiz Malik	13 August 2018		
Punjab	NA-128 (Lahore-VI)	Pakistan Muslim League (N)	Shaikh Rohale Asghar	13 August 2018		
Punjab	NA-129 (Lahore-VII)	Pakistan Muslim League (N)	Ayaz Sadiq	13 August 2018		
Punjab	NA-130 (Lahore-VIII)	Pakistan Tehreek-e-Insaf	Shafqat Mahmood	13 August 2018	Resigned (10 April 2022)	
Punjab	NA-131 (Lahore-IX)	Pakistan Muslim League (N)	Khawaja Saad Rafique	29 October 2018		
Punjab	NA-132 (Lahore-X)	Pakistan Muslim League (N)	Shehbaz Sharif	13 August 2018		
Punjab	NA-133 (Lahore-XI)	Pakistan Muslim League (N)	Muhammad Pervaiz Malik	13 August 2018		
Punjab	NA-134 (Lahore-XII)	Pakistan Muslim League (N)	Rana Mubashir Iqbal	13 August 2018		
Punjab	NA-135 (Lahore-XIII)	Pakistan Tehreek-e-Insaf	Malik Karamat Khokhar	13 August 2018		
Punjab	NA-136 (Lahore-XIV)	Pakistan Muslim League (N)	Afzal Khokhar	13 August 2018		
Punjab	NA-137 (Kasur-I)	Pakistan Muslim League (N)	Saad Waseem Akhtar Sheikh	13 August 2018		
Punjab	NA-138 (Kasur-II)	Pakistan Muslim League (N)	Malik Rasheed Ahmed Khan	13 August 2018		
Punjab	NA-139 (Kasur-III)	Pakistan Muslim League (N)	Rana Muhammad Ishaq	13 August 2018		
Punjab	NA-140 (Kasur-IV)	Pakistan Tehreek-e-Insaf	Sardar Talib Hassan Nakai	13 August 2018		
Punjab	NA-141 (Okara-I)	Pakistan Muslim League (N)	Chaudhry Nadeem Abbas	13 August 2018		
Punjab	NA-142 (Okara-II)	Pakistan Muslim League (N)	Chaudhry Riaz-ul-Haq	13 August 2018		
Punjab	NA-143 (Okara-III)	Pakistan Muslim League (N)	Rao Muhammad Ajmal Khan	13 August 2018		
Punjab	NA-144 (Okara-IV)	Pakistan Muslim League (N)	Muhammad Moeen Wattoo	13 August 2018		
Punjab	NA-145 (Pakpattan-I)	Pakistan Muslim League (N)	Ahmad Raza Maneka	13 August 2018		
Punjab	NA-146 (Pakpattan-II)	Pakistan Muslim League (N)	Rana Iradat Sharif Khan	13 August 2018		
Punjab	NA-147 (Sahiwal-I)	Pakistan Muslim League (N)	Syed Imran Ahmed	13 August 2018		
Punjab	NA-148 (Sahiwal-II)	Pakistan Muslim League (N)	Chaudhry Muhammad Ashraf	13 August 2018		
Punjab	NA-149 (Sahiwal-III)	Pakistan Tehreek-e-Insaf	Rai Muhammad Murtaza Iqbal	13 August 2018		
Punjab	NA-150 (Khanewal-I)	Pakistan Tehreek-e-Insaf	Fakhar Imam	13 August 2018	Resigned (10 April 2022)	
Punjab	NA-151 (Khanewal-II)	Pakistan Muslim League (N)	Muhammad Khan Daha	13 August 2018		
Punjab	NA-152 (Khanewal-III)	Pakistan Tehreek-e-Insaf	Zahoor Hussain Qureshi	13 August 2018		
Punjab	NA-153 (Khanewal-IV)	Pakistan Muslim League (N)	Chaudhry Iftikhar Nazir	13 August 2018		
Punjab	NA-154 (Multan-I)	Pakistan Tehreek-e-Insaf	Malik Ahmed Hussain Dehar	13 August 2018		
Punjab	NA-155 (Multan-II)	Pakistan Tehreek-e-Insaf	Malik Aamir Dogar	13 August 2018	Resigned (10 April 2022)	
Punjab	NA-156 (Multan-III)	Pakistan Tehreek-e-Insaf	Shah Mehmood Qureshi	13 August 2018	Resigned (10 April 2022)	
Punjab	NA-157 (Multan-IV)	Pakistan Tehreek-e-Insaf	Zain Qureshi	13 August 2018		
Punjab	NA-158 (Multan-V)	Pakistan Tehreek-e-Insaf	Ibrahim Khan	13 August 2018		
Punjab	NA-159 (Multan-VI)	Pakistan Tehreek-e-Insaf	Rana Muhammad Qasim Noon	13 August 2018		
Punjab	NA-160 (Lodhran-I)	Pakistan Muslim League (N)	Abdul Rehman Khan Kanju	13 August 2018		
Punjab	NA-161 (Lodhran-II)	Pakistan Tehreek-e-Insaf	Mian Muhammad Shafiq	13 August 2018		
Punjab	NA-162 (Vehari-I)	Pakistan Muslim League (N)	Choudhry Faqir Ahmad	13 August 2018		
Punjab	NA-163 (Vehari-II)	Pakistan Muslim League (N)	Syed Sajid Mehdi	13 August 2018		
Punjab	NA-164 (Vehari-III)	Pakistan Tehreek-e-Insaf	Tahir Iqbal	13 August 2018		
Punjab	NA-165 (Vehari-IV)	Pakistan Tehreek-e-Insaf	Aurangzeb Khan Khichi	13 August 2018		
Punjab	NA-166 (Bahawalnagar-I)	Pakistan Tehreek-e-Insaf	Abdul Ghaffar Wattoo	13 August 2018		
Punjab	NA-167 (Bahawalnagar-II)	Pakistan Muslim League (N)	Alam Dad Lalika	13 August 2018		
Punjab	NA-168 (Bahawalnagar-III)	Pakistan Muslim League (N)	Ihsan ul Haq Bajwa	13 August 2018		
Punjab	NA-169 (Bahawalnagar-IV)	Pakistan Muslim League (N)	Noor Ul Hassan Tanvir	13 August 2018		
Punjab	NA-170 (Bahawalpur-I)	Pakistan Tehreek-e-Insaf	Muhammad Farooq Azam Malik	13 August 2018		
Punjab	NA-171 (Bahawalpur-II)	Pakistan Muslim League (N)	Riaz Hussain Pirzada	13 August 2018		
Punjab	NA-172 (Bahawalpur-III)	Pakistan Muslim League (Q)	Tariq Bashir Cheema	13 August 2018		
Punjab	NA-173 (Bahawalpur-IV)	Pakistan Muslim League (N)	Najibuddin Awaisi	13 August 2018		
Punjab	NA-174 (Bahawalpur-V)	Pakistan Tehreek-e-Insaf	Makhdoom Syed Sami Ul Hassan Gillani	13 August 2018		
Punjab	NA-175 (Rahim Yar Khan-I)	Pakistan Tehreek-e-Insaf	Syed Mobeen Ahmed	13 August 2018		
Punjab	NA-176 (Rahim Yar Khan-II)	Pakistan Muslim League (N)	Sheikh Fayyaz Ud Din	13 August 2018		
Punjab	NA-177 (Rahim Yar Khan-III)	Pakistan Tehreek-e-Insaf	Khusro Bakhtiar	13 August 2018	Resigned (10 April 2022)	
Punjab	NA-178 (Rahim Yar Khan-IV)	Pakistan Peoples Party	Mustafa Mehmood	13 August 2018		
Punjab	NA-179 (Rahim Yar Khan-V)	Pakistan Tehreek-e-Insaf	Javed Iqbal Warraich	13 August 2018		
Punjab	NA-180 (Rahim Yar Khan-VI)	Pakistan Peoples Party	Makhdoom Syed Murtaza Mehmood	13 August 2018		
Punjab	NA-181 (Muzaffargarh-I)	Pakistan Tehreek-e-Insaf	Shabbir Ali Qureshi	13 August 2018	Resigned (10 April 2022)	
Punjab	NA-182 (Muzaffargarh-II)	Pakistan Peoples Party	Mehr Irshad Ahmed Sial	13 August 2018		
Punjab	NA-183 (Muzaffargarh-III)	Pakistan Peoples Party	Malik Ghulam Raza Rabbani Khar	13 August 2018		
Punjab	NA-184 (Muzaffargarh-IV)	Pakistan Peoples Party	Iftikhar Ahmed Khan Babar	13 August 2018		
Punjab	NA-185 (Muzaffargarh-V)	Pakistan Tehreek-e-Insaf	Syed Basit Sultan Bukhari	13 August 2018		
Punjab	NA-186 (Muzaffargarh-VI)	Pakistan Tehreek-e-Insaf	Sardar Aamir Talal Khan Gopang	13 August 2018		
Punjab	NA-187 (Layyah-I)	Pakistan Tehreek-e-Insaf	Abdul Majeed Khan Niazi	13 August 2018		
Punjab	NA-188 (Layyah-II)	Pakistan Tehreek-e-Insaf	Niaz Ahmed Jhakkar	13 August 2018		
Punjab	NA-189 (Dera Ghazi Khan-I)	Pakistan Tehreek-e-Insaf	Khawaja Sheraz Mehmood	13 August 2018		
Punjab	NA-190 (Dera Ghazi Khan-II)	Pakistan Tehreek-e-Insaf	Amjad Farooq Khan	13 August 2018		
Punjab	NA-191 (Dera Ghazi Khan-III)	Pakistan Tehreek-e-Insaf	Zartaj Gul	13 August 2018	Resigned (10 April 2022)	
Punjab	NA-192 (Dera Ghazi Khan-IV)	Pakistan Tehreek-e-Insaf	Sardar Muhammad Khan Laghari	13 August 2018		
Punjab	NA-193 (Rajanpur-I)	Pakistan Tehreek-e-Insaf	Sardar Muhammad Jaffar Khan Leghari	13 August 2018		
Punjab	NA-194 (Rajanpur-II)	Pakistan Tehreek-e-Insaf	Sardar Nasrullah Khan Dreshak	13 August 2018		
Punjab	NA-195 (Rajanpur-III)	Pakistan Tehreek-e-Insaf	Sardar Riaz Mehmood Khan Mazari	13 August 2018		
Sindh	NA-196 (Jacobabad)	Pakistan Tehreek-e-Insaf	Muhammad Mian Soomro	13 August 2018	Resigned (10 April 2022)	
Sindh	NA-197 (Kashmore)	Pakistan Peoples Party	Ehsan ur Rehman Mazari	13 August 2018		
Sindh	NA-198 (Shikarpur-I)	Pakistan Peoples Party	Abid Hussain Bhayo	13 August 2018		
Sindh	NA-199 (Shikarpur-II)	Grand Democratic Alliance	Ghos Bakhsh Khan Mahar	13 August 2018		
Sindh	NA-200 (Larkana-I)	Pakistan Peoples Party	Bilawal Bhutto Zardari	13 August 2018		
Sindh	NA-201 (Larkana-II)	Pakistan Peoples Party	Khursheed Ahmed Junejo	13 August 2018		
Sindh	NA-202 (Qambar Shahdadkot-I)	Pakistan Peoples Party	Aftab Shaban Mirani	13 August 2018		
Sindh	NA-203 (Qambar Shahdadkot-II)	Pakistan Peoples Party	Mir Aamir Ali Khan Magsi	13 August 2018		
Sindh	NA-204 (Ghotki-I)	Pakistan Peoples Party	Sardar Khalid Ahmed Khan Lund	13 August 2018		
Sindh	NA-205 (Ghotki-II)	Pakistan Peoples Party	Sardar Muhammad Bakhsh Khan Mahar			
Sindh	NA-206 (Sukkur-I)	Pakistan Peoples Party	Syed Khurshid Ahmed Shah	13 August 2018		
Sindh	NA-207 (Sukkur-II)	Pakistan Peoples Party	Nauman Islam Shaikh	13 August 2018		
Sindh	NA-208 (Khairpur-I)	Pakistan Peoples Party	Nafisa Shah	13 August 2018		
Sindh	NA-209 (Khairpur-II)	Pakistan Peoples Party	Fazal Ali Shah	13 August 2018		
Sindh	NA-210 (Khairpur-III)	Pakistan Peoples Party	Syed Javed Ali Shah Jillani	13 August 2018		
Sindh	NA-211 (Naushahro Feroze-I)	Pakistan Peoples Party	Sayed Abrar Ali Shah	13 August 2018		
Sindh	NA-212 (Naushahro Feroze-II)	Pakistan Peoples Party	Zulfiqar Ali Behan	13 August 2018		
Sindh	NA-213 (Shaheed Benazirabad-I)	Pakistan Peoples Party	Asif Ali Zardari	13 August 2018		
Sindh	NA-214 (Shaheed Benazirabad-II)	Pakistan Peoples Party	Syed Gulam Mustafa Shah	13 August 2018		
Sindh	NA-215 (Sanghar-I)	Pakistan Peoples Party	Naveed Dero	15 August 2018		
Sindh	NA-216 (Sanghar-II)	Pakistan Peoples Party	Shazia Marri	13 August 2018		
Sindh	NA-217 (Sanghar-III)	Pakistan Peoples Party	Roshan Din Junejo	13 August 2018		
Sindh	NA-218 (Mirpur Khas-I)	Independent	Syed Ali Nawaz Shah Rizvi	13 August 2018		
Sindh	NA-219 (Mirpur Khas-II)	Pakistan Peoples Party	Mir Munawar Ali Talpur	13 August 2018		
Sindh	NA-220 (Umerkot)	Pakistan Peoples Party	Nawab Muhammad Yousuf	13 August 2018		
Sindh	NA-221 (Tharparkar-I)	Pakistan Peoples Party	Pir Noor Muhammad Shah Jeelani	13 August 2018		
Sindh	NA-222 (Tharparkar-II)	Pakistan Peoples Party	Mahesh Kumar Malani	13 August 2018		
Sindh	NA-223 (Matiari)	Pakistan Peoples Party	Makhdoom Jameeluz Zaman	13 August 2018		
Sindh	NA-224 (Tando Allahyar)	Pakistan Peoples Party	Zulfiqar Sattar Bachani	13 August 2018		
Sindh	NA-225 (Hyderabad-I)	Pakistan Peoples Party	Syed Hussain Tariq	13 August 2018		
Sindh	NA-226 (Hyderabad-II)	Muttahida Qaumi Movement	Sabir Hussain Qaimkhani	13 August 2018		
Sindh	NA-227 (Hyderabad-III)	Muttahida Qaumi Movement	Salahuddin	13 August 2018		
Sindh	NA-228 (Tando Muhammad Khan)	Pakistan Peoples Party	Naveed Qamar	13 August 2018		
Sindh	NA-229 (Badin-I)	Pakistan Peoples Party	Mir Ghulam Ali Talpur	13 August 2018		
Sindh	NA-230 (Badin-II)	Grand Democratic Alliance	Fehmida Mirza	13 August 2018		
Sindh	NA-231 (Sujawal)	Pakistan Peoples Party	Syed Ayaz Ali Shah Sheerazi	13 August 2018		
Sindh	NA-232 (Thatta)	Pakistan Peoples Party	Shams un Nisa	13 August 2018		
Sindh	NA-233 (Jamshoro)	Pakistan Peoples Party	Sikander Ali Rahupoto	13 August 2018		
Sindh	NA-234 (Dadu-I)	Pakistan Peoples Party	Irfan Zafar Leghari	13 August 2018		
Sindh	NA-235 (Dadu-II)	Pakistan Peoples Party	Rafiq Ahmed Jamali	13 August 2018		
Sindh	NA-236 (Malir-I)	Pakistan Peoples Party	Jam Abdul Karim Bijar	13 August 2018		
Sindh	NA-237 (Malir-II)	Pakistan Tehreek-e-Insaf	Jamil Ahmed Khan	13 August 2018		
Sindh	NA-238 (Malir-III)	Pakistan Peoples Party	Syed Rafiullah	13 August 2018		
Sindh	NA-239 (Korangi Karachi-I)	Pakistan Tehreek-e-Insaf	Muhammad Akram	13 August 2018		
Sindh	NA-240 (Korangi Karachi-II)	Muttahida Qaumi Movement	Iqbal Muhammad Ali Khan	13 August 2018		
Sindh	NA-241 (Korangi Karachi-III)	Pakistan Tehreek-e-Insaf	Faheem Khan	13 August 2018		
Sindh	NA-242 (Karachi East-I)	Pakistan Tehreek-e-Insaf	Saifur Rehman	13 August 2018		
Sindh	NA-243 (Karachi East-II)	Pakistan Tehreek-e-Insaf	Alamgir Khan	29 October 2018		
Sindh	NA-244 (Karachi East-III)	Pakistan Tehreek-e-Insaf	Ali Haider Zaidi	13 August 2018	Resigned (10 April 2022)	
Sindh	NA-245 (Karachi East-IV)	Pakistan Tehreek-e-Insaf	Aamir Liaquat Hussain	13 August 2018	9 June 2022	
Sindh	NA-246 (Karachi South-I)	Pakistan Tehreek-e-Insaf	Abdul Shakoor Shad	13 August 2018		
Sindh	NA-247 (Karachi South-II)	Pakistan Tehreek-e-Insaf	Aftab Siddiqui	29 October 2018		
Sindh	NA-248 (Karachi West-I)	Pakistan Peoples Party	Abdul Qadir Patel	13 August 2018		
Sindh	NA-249 (Karachi West-II)	Pakistan Tehreek-e-Insaf	Faisal Vawda	13 August 2018		
Sindh	NA-250 (Karachi West-III)	Pakistan Tehreek-e-Insaf	Attaullah	13 August 2018		
Sindh	NA-251 (Karachi West-IV)	Muttahida Qaumi Movement	Syed Aminul Haque	13 August 2018		
Sindh	NA-252 (Karachi West-V)	Pakistan Tehreek-e-Insaf	Aftab Jehangir	13 August 2018		
Sindh	NA-253 (Karachi Central-I)	Muttahida Qaumi Movement	Usama Qadri	13 August 2018		
Sindh	NA-254 (Karachi Central-II)	Pakistan Tehreek-e-Insaf	Mohammad Aslam Khan	13 August 2018		
Sindh	NA-255 (Karachi Central-III)	Muttahida Qaumi Movement	Khalid Maqbool Siddiqui	13 August 2018		
Sindh	NA-256 (Karachi Central-IV)	Pakistan Tehreek-e-Insaf	Najeeb Haroon	13 August 2018		
Balochistan	NA-257 (Killa Saifullah-cum-Zhob-cum-Sherani)	Muttahida Majlis-e-Amal	Maulana Abdul Wasay	13 August 2018		
Balochistan	NA-258 (Loralai-cum-Musakhel-cum-Ziarat-cum-Duki-cum-Harnai)	Balochistan Awami Party	Muhammad Israr Tareen	13 August 2018		
Balochistan	NA-259 (Dera Bugti-cum-Kohlu-cum-Barkhan-cum-Sibbi-cum-Lehri)	Jamhoori Wattan Party	Shahzain Bugti	13 August 2018		
Balochistan	NA-260 (Nasirabad-cum-Kachhi-cum-Jhal Magsi)	Balochistan Awami Party	Khalid Hussain Magsi	13 August 2018		
Balochistan	NA-261 (Jafarabad-cum-Sohbatpur)	Pakistan Tehreek-e-Insaf	Mir Khan Muhammad Jamali	13 August 2018		
Balochistan	NA-262 (Pishin)	Muttahida Majlis-e-Amal	Kamaluddin	13 August 2018		
Balochistan	NA-263 (Killa Abdullah)	Muttahida Majlis-e-Amal	Salahuddin	13 August 2018		
Balochistan	NA-264 (Quetta-I)	Muttahida Majlis-e-Amal	Maulvi Asmatullah	13 August 2018		
Balochistan	NA-265 (Quetta-II)	Pakistan Tehreek-e-Insaf	Qasim Khan Suri	13 August 2018	Resigned (10 April 2022)	
Balochistan	NA-266 (Quetta-III)	Balochistan National Party (Mengal)	Agha Hassan Baloch	13 August 2018		
Balochistan	NA-267 (Mastung-cum-Shaheed Sikandarabad-cum-Kalat)	Muttahida Majlis-e-Amal	Syed Mehmood Shah	13 August 2018		
Balochistan	NA-268 (Chagai-cum-Nushki-cum-Kharan)	Balochistan National Party (Mengal)	Muhammad Hashim	13 August 2018		
Balochistan	NA-269 (Khuzdar)	Balochistan National Party (Mengal)	Akhtar Mengal	13 August 2018		
Balochistan	NA-270 (Panjgur-cum-Washuk-cum-Awaran)	Balochistan Awami Party	Ehsanullah Reki	13 August 2018		
Balochistan	NA-271 (Kech)	Balochistan Awami Party	Zubaida Jalal Khan	13 August 2018		
Balochistan	NA-272 (Lasbela-cum-Gwadar)	Independent	Mohammad Aslam Bhutani	13 August 2018		

Indirectly elected on reserved seats
Region	Seat	Political party	Member	Assumed office	Term duration	Ref.
Balochistan	Reserved seats for women	Muttahida Majlis-e-Amal	Aliya Kamran	13 August 2018		
Balochistan	Reserved seats for women	Balochistan Awami Party	Rubina Irfan	13 August 2018		
Balochistan	Reserved seats for women	Balochistan National Party (Mengal)	Shahnaz Naseer Baloch	13 August 2018		
Balochistan	Reserved seats for women	Pakistan Tehreek-e-Insaf	Munawara Bibi Baloch	13 August 2018		
Khyber Pakhtunkhwa	Reserved seats for women	Pakistan Tehreek-e-Insaf	Nafeesa Inayatullah Khan Khattak	13 August 2018		
Khyber Pakhtunkhwa	Reserved seats for women	Pakistan Tehreek-e-Insaf	Sajida Zulfiqar	13 August 2018		
Khyber Pakhtunkhwa	Reserved seats for women	Pakistan Tehreek-e-Insaf	Naureen Farouq Ibrahim	13 August 2018		
Khyber Pakhtunkhwa	Reserved seats for women	Pakistan Tehreek-e-Insaf	Shandana Gulzar Khan	13 August 2018		
Khyber Pakhtunkhwa	Reserved seats for women	Pakistan Tehreek-e-Insaf	Uzma Riaz Jadoon	13 August 2018		
Khyber Pakhtunkhwa	Reserved seats for women	Pakistan Tehreek-e-Insaf	Zill-e-Huma	13 August 2018		
Khyber Pakhtunkhwa	Reserved seats for women	Pakistan Tehreek-e-Insaf	Shaheen Naz Saifullah	27 September 2018		
Khyber Pakhtunkhwa	Reserved seats for women	Muttahida Majlis-e-Amal	Shahida Begum	13 August 2018		
Khyber Pakhtunkhwa	Reserved seats for women	Pakistan Muslim League (N)	Begum Tahira Bukhari	13 August 2018		
Punjab	Reserved seats for women	Pakistan Muslim League (N)	Tahira Aurangzeb	13 August 2018		
Punjab	Reserved seats for women	Pakistan Muslim League (N)	Shaista Pervaiz	13 August 2018		
Punjab	Reserved seats for women	Pakistan Muslim League (N)	Ayesha Rajab Ali	13 August 2018		
Punjab	Reserved seats for women	Pakistan Muslim League (N)	Maryam Aurangzeb	13 August 2018		
Punjab	Reserved seats for women	Pakistan Muslim League (N)	Shaza Fatima Khawaja	13 August 2018		
Punjab	Reserved seats for women	Pakistan Muslim League (N)	Aisha Ghaus Pasha	13 August 2018		
Punjab	Reserved seats for women	Pakistan Muslim League (N)	Zahra Wadood Fatemi	13 August 2018		
Punjab	Reserved seats for women	Pakistan Muslim League (N)	Kiran Imran Dar	13 August 2018		
Punjab	Reserved seats for women	Pakistan Muslim League (N)	Romina Khurshid Alam	13 August 2018		
Punjab	Reserved seats for women	Pakistan Muslim League (N)	Musarrat Asif Khawaja	13 August 2018		
Punjab	Reserved seats for women	Pakistan Muslim League (N)	Zaib Jaffar	13 August 2018		
Punjab	Reserved seats for women	Pakistan Muslim League (N)	Samina Matloob	13 August 2018		
Punjab	Reserved seats for women	Pakistan Muslim League (N)	Shahnaz Saleem Malik	13 August 2018		
Punjab	Reserved seats for women	Pakistan Muslim League (N)	Seema Mohiuddin Jameeli	13 August 2018		
Punjab	Reserved seats for women	Pakistan Muslim League (N)	Maiza Hameed	13 August 2018		
Punjab	Reserved seats for women	Pakistan Tehreek-e-Insaf	Shireen Mazari	13 August 2018		
Punjab	Reserved seats for women	Pakistan Tehreek-e-Insaf	Munaza Hassan	13 August 2018		
Punjab	Reserved seats for women	Pakistan Tehreek-e-Insaf	Andleeb Abbas	13 August 2018		
Punjab	Reserved seats for women	Pakistan Tehreek-e-Insaf	Asma Qadeer	13 August 2018		
Punjab	Reserved seats for women	Pakistan Tehreek-e-Insaf	Aliya Hamza Malik	13 August 2018		
Punjab	Reserved seats for women	Pakistan Tehreek-e-Insaf	Javeria Zafar	13 August 2018		
Punjab	Reserved seats for women	Pakistan Tehreek-e-Insaf	Kanwal Shauzab	13 August 2018		
Punjab	Reserved seats for women	Pakistan Tehreek-e-Insaf	Seemin Bokhari	13 August 2018		
Punjab	Reserved seats for women	Pakistan Tehreek-e-Insaf	Sobia Kamal Khan	13 August 2018		
Punjab	Reserved seats for women	Pakistan Tehreek-e-Insaf	Nausheen Hamid	13 August 2018		
Punjab	Reserved seats for women	Pakistan Tehreek-e-Insaf	Rubina Jamil	13 August 2018		
Punjab	Reserved seats for women	Pakistan Tehreek-e-Insaf	Maleeka Bokhari	13 August 2018		
Punjab	Reserved seats for women	Pakistan Tehreek-e-Insaf	Fozia Behram	13 August 2018		
Punjab	Reserved seats for women	Pakistan Tehreek-e-Insaf	Rukhsana Naveed	13 August 2018		
Punjab	Reserved seats for women	Pakistan Tehreek-e-Insaf	Tashfeen Safdar	13 August 2018		
Punjab	Reserved seats for women	Pakistan Tehreek-e-Insaf	Wajiha Akram	13 August 2018		
Punjab	Reserved seats for women	Pakistan Peoples Party	Hina Rabbani Khar	13 August 2018		
Punjab	Reserved seats for women	Pakistan Muslim League (Q)	Farrukh Khan	13 August 2018		
Sindh	Reserved seats for women	Pakistan Peoples Party	Shagufta Jumani	13 August 2018		
Sindh	Reserved seats for women	Pakistan Peoples Party	Nasiba Channa	15 August 2018		
Sindh	Reserved seats for women	Pakistan Peoples Party	Musarat Rafique Mahesar	13 August 2018		
Sindh	Reserved seats for women	Pakistan Peoples Party	Naz Baloch	13 August 2018		
Sindh	Reserved seats for women	Pakistan Peoples Party	Shahida Rehmani	13 August 2018		
Sindh	Reserved seats for women	Pakistan Peoples Party	Mahreen Razaque Bhutto	13 August 2018		
Sindh	Reserved seats for women	Pakistan Peoples Party	Shazia Sobia	13 August 2018		
Sindh	Reserved seats for women	Pakistan Peoples Party	Shamim Ara Panhwar	13 August 2018		
Sindh	Reserved seats for women	Pakistan Tehreek-e-Insaf	Saima Nadeem	13 August 2018		
Sindh	Reserved seats for women	Pakistan Tehreek-e-Insaf	Ghazala Saifee	13 August 2018		
Sindh	Reserved seats for women	Pakistan Tehreek-e-Insaf	Nuzhat Pathan	13 August 2018		
Sindh	Reserved seats for women	Pakistan Tehreek-e-Insaf	Nusrat Wahid	13 August 2018		
Sindh	Reserved seats for women	Muttahida Qaumi Movement	Kishwer Zehra	13 August 2018		
Sindh	Reserved seats for women	Grand Democratic Alliance	Saira Bano	13 August 2018		
National	Reserved seats for minorities	Pakistan Tehreek-e-Insaf	Lal Chand Malhi	13 August 2018		
National	Reserved seats for minorities	Pakistan Tehreek-e-Insaf	Shunila Ruth	13 August 2018		
National	Reserved seats for minorities	Pakistan Tehreek-e-Insaf	Ramesh Kumar Vankwani	13 August 2018		
National	Reserved seats for minorities	Pakistan Tehreek-e-Insaf	Jai Parkash Ukrani	13 August 2018		
National	Reserved seats for minorities	Pakistan Tehreek-e-Insaf	Jamshed Thomas	13 August 2018		
National	Reserved seats for minorities	Pakistan Muslim League (N)	Darshan Punshi	13 August 2018		
National	Reserved seats for minorities	Pakistan Muslim League (N)	Kheal Das Kohistani	13 August 2018		
National	Reserved seats for minorities	Pakistan Peoples Party	Ramesh Lal	13 August 2018		
National	Reserved seats for minorities	Pakistan Peoples Party	Naveed Amir	13 August 2018		
National	Reserved seats for minorities	Muttahida Majlis-e-Amal	James Iqbal	13 August 2018		

== Membership changes ==
Region	Constituency	Incumbent elected in 2018 general elections for the 15th National Assembly			Ref.
Region	Constituency	Political party	Member	Notes	Ref.
Sindh	NA-247 (Karachi South-II)	Arif Alvi	Pakistan Tehreek-e-Insaf	Was elected in July 2018 general election. Relinquished the seat in September 2018 after becoming the President of Pakistan.	
Punjab	NA-91 (Sargodha-IV)	Zulfiqar Ali Bhatti	Pakistan Muslim League (N)	Was elected in July 2018 general elections. His membership was revoked after re-polling was conducted on 20 polling stations in February 2019.	
Sindh	NA-205 (Ghotki-II)	Ali Mohammad Mahar	Pakistan Tehreek-e-Insaf	He was elected in July 2018 general election. He died on 21 May 2019.	

== See also ==
- List of members of the 14th National Assembly of Pakistan
- List of members of the 16th National Assembly of Pakistan
