= Women in Pakistani politics =

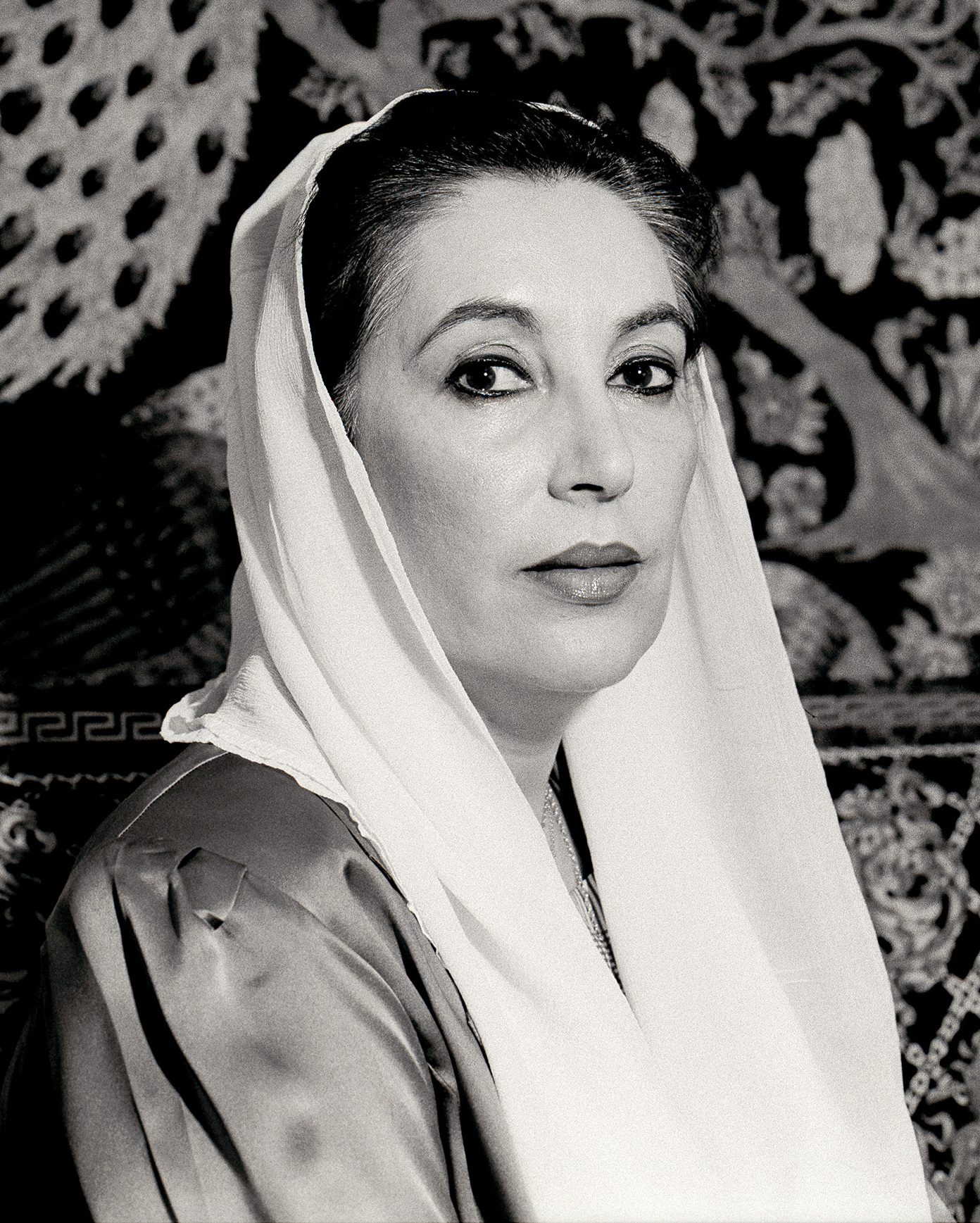
Benazir Bhutto, Pakistan’s first and only female Prime Minister

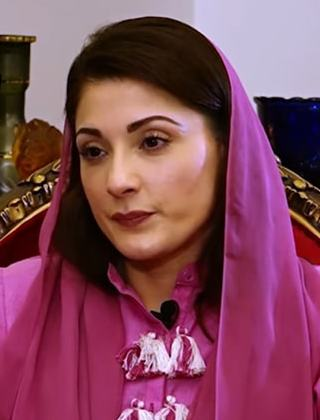
Maryam Nawaz, first woman to become Chief Minister of any province of Pakistan

Since Pakistan's independence on 14 August 1947, women have been active participants in parliamentary politics. Their representation remained low in the first and second Constituent Assemblies, however the amendments to the Constitution of Pakistan paved way for their increased participation in the parliament. Besides, the progressive laws helped improve their participation in legislative and executive positions over the years. Since 2002, women politicians have notable representation in the federal as well as provincial assemblies.

Women as equal citizen of Pakistan are free to contest general elections and to be elected to any public office at the national, provincial and local levels without any discrimination. They have a liberty to exercise their right to vote in all elections, general or by-polls, which they could since independence and were reprised in the 1956 constitution. They can run for elections directly as well as through women's reserved quota. There is no legal compulsion on women to hold any highest public office. Pakistan has hosted women as the Prime Minister, Federal Minister, Speaker of the National Assembly, and the Leader of the Opposition, etc.

== Constitutional and Legislative measures regarding women's representation in Politics ==
The successive governments in Pakistan, and the parliamentarians have contributed to ensure women's significant representation in the legislative bodies. For this, the government undertook affirmative measures through introducing several provisions in the Constitution and laws of Pakistan. For instance,

The Constitution of Pakistan of 1956 reserved 10 seats for women in the unicameral Parliament with five seats each from East and West Pakistan.

The Constitution of Pakistan of 1962 reserved six seats for women in the National Assembly with three seats each from East and West Pakistan.

The Constitution of the Pakistan of 1973 reserved 10 seats for women for a period of ten years from the commencing day of the Constitution or holding of the third general elections to the National Assembly, whichever occurred later. In 1985, ten (10) seats were increased to twenty (20) whereas, the reserved seats for women were increased to sixty (60) in 2002 during the era of General Pervaiz Musharraf.

Various provisions of the Constitution of Pakistan 1973 affirm the state's resolve to minimize gender disparity by the elimination of discrimination on the basis of gender and encouraging participation of women in all walks of life. Article 17 (2) of the Constitution provides every citizen with the right to form or be a member of a political party. Article 34 of the Constitution emphasizes full participation of women in national life and states that "Steps shall be taken to ensure full participation of women in all spheres of national life". In order to implement the fundamental rights guaranteed in the constitution, substantive amendments in the constitution as well as election laws are made to ensure increased women's participation in political process. For instance, 60 seats for women are reserved in the National Assembly under Article 51 and 17 seats are reserved in the Senate of Pakistan under Article 59. While, 168 seats for the provincial assemblies i.e. Balochistan (11), Khyber Pakhtunkhwa (26), Punjab (66) and Sindh (29) under Article 106 of the Constitution. Similarly, the Elections Act, 2017 directed the political parties to ensure at least five per cent representation of women candidates when fielding candidates for general seats, which is a progressive development to encourage representation of women in legislative bodies.

== Analysis & Statistics ==
There is a huge gender gap in terms of voters according to the data released by the Election Commission of Pakistan revealing that there are 64 million males (55%), 51 million females (45%) and (0.002%) transgender voters in Pakistan.

As of April 1, 2026, the Inter-Parliamentary Union ranks Pakistan 111th in the list of 180 countries in terms of representation of women. Pakistan is ranked at 93 among 153 countries in women's political empowerment where 20.2% of women are legislators, whereas 12% of women are appointed at ministerial positions, according to the Global Gender Gap Report 2020.

According to CSOs alternative report submitted to UN's CEDAW Committee, gender ratios of Cabinet members at the national and provincial levels are: Federal 6:36, Punjab 2:43, Sindh 2:18, while there is no representation of women in cabinets in Balochistan and Khyber Pakhtunkhwa. Women chair 2 out of 34 standing committees of the National assembly and 10 out of 50 Senate Committees. The gender ratio among Parliamentary Secretaries is 14:36. Provincial ratios of Standing Committee Chairs are: Balochistan 6:12, KP 3:31, Punjab 10:14, Sindh 2:17.

According to a study on Gender Audit of Women's Political Representation in the Legislative Assemblies in the South Asian countries, Nepal has 32.7% women in the parliament, followed by Afghanistan 27.3% Bangladesh 20.6%, Pakistan 20.2%, Bhutan 14.9%, India 12.6%, Sri Lanka 5.3% and Maldives 4.7%. The highest ratio of women's representation in the National Assembly of Pakistan was around 22 percent between 2008 and 2013. However, it was only 19 percent in the studies's legislative assemblies, and no woman has representation in the cabinets of Khyber Pakhtunkhwa and Balochistan.

== Representation of Women in the National Parliament of Pakistan ==
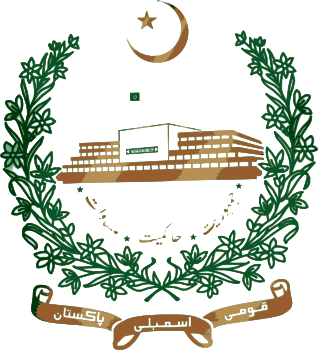
Emblem of the National Assembly of Pakistan

=== History (1947 to 2018) ===
==== Constituent Assembly and the National Assembly ====
In the first Constituent Assembly of Pakistan, composed of 69 members, two women Begum Shaista Suhrawardy Ikramullah and Begum Jahanara Shahnawaz served from 1947 to 1954. However, there was no representation of women in the Second Constituent Assembly, which had 72 members serving from 1955 to 1958.

In the 3rd National Assembly from 1962 to 1964, eight women were elected as MNAs, including six on reserved seats and two on general seats. They were Begum Shamsun Nahar Mahmood, Begum Hamida Mohammad Ali, Begum Roquyya Anwar, M.A., Begum Serajunnessa Choudhury, Zahara Aziz, Begum Mujeeb-un-nisa Mohammad Akram, Begum Khudeja G A Khan, and Begum Zari Sarfaraz.

Six women politicians were elected on reserved seats as members of the 4th National Assembly from 1965 to 1969. They consisted of Begum Mariam Hashimuddin Ahmed, Begum Razia Faiz, Begum Dolly Azad, Begum Mujeeb-un-nisa Mohammad Akram, Begum Khudeja Khan, S.I., T.Pk., and Begum Zari Sarfraz.

In the 5th National Assembly from 1972 to 1977, six women politicians were elected on reserved seats for women. Another woman member, Mrs. Najma Andrews, was elected on a reserved seat for minorities after the death of her husband R.M. Andrews, who was the sitting member of the National Assembly. They include; Shireen Wahab Sahiba, Nargis Naim Sandhu, Begum Nasim Jahan, Begum Zahida Sultana, Dr. Mrs. Ashraf Abbasi and Jennifer Jehanzeba Qazi Musa.

Ten women were elected on reserved seats, while Begum Naseem Abdul Wali Khan and Begum Naseem Wali Khan were elected on general seats as a result of the 1977 Pakistani general election. The 6th National Assembly did function from 28 March 1977 to 5 July 1977, but ultimately it had to dissolve owing to the political movement against the PPP government on the allegation of rigging in elections. Mrs. Naseem Wali Khan was the first woman to have been elected from the North-West Frontier Province. However, due to the Opposition's boycott, she never took oath as a member.

In the 7th National Assembly, twenty-one women were elected on reserved seats whereas two women were elected on general seats as MNAs for the term from 1985 to 1988.

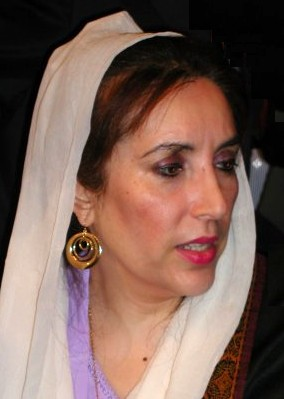
Benazir Bhutto

In the 8th National Assembly for the term (1988–1990), twenty women were elected on reserved seats whereas four women were elected on general seats including Mohtrama Benazir Bhutto who became the first woman Prime Minister of Pakistan.

In the 9th National Assembly for the term (1990–1993), Benazir Bhutto and Begum Nusrat Bhutto were the only two women members who were elected on general seats. No woman was elected on the reserved seat due to the sunset clause in the Constitution where this provision had expired after three election cycles.

Four women candidates were elected on general seats to serve as members of the 10th National Assembly and served for the term from 1993 to 1996 including Benazir who became prime minister for the second time. Six women politicians were elected on general seats for the 11th National Assembly and served as MNAs for the term from 1997 to 1999.

Seventy-four women political representatives including thirteen on general seats, sixty on reserved women seats and one on non-Muslim seat were elected as MNAs for the 12th National Assembly that completed its five years term i.e. 2002-2007.

Seventy-six women candidates including sixteen on general seats and sixty on reserved seats were elected as members of the 13th National Assembly, serving for five years term from 2008 to 2013.

Seventy women politicians including nine on general seats, sixty on reserved women seats and one on non-Muslim seat were elected as members of the 14th National Assembly that served for the complete term of five years i.e. 2013-2018.

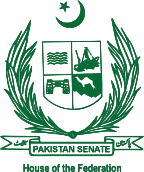
Emblem of Senate of Pakistan

==== Senate of Pakistan (1973–2018) ====
Senator Samia Usman Fatah took oath on 6 August 1973 as the only woman member in the first Senate of Pakistan who served for the term from 1973 to 1975.

Senators Asifa Farooqi and Aziza Humayun were elected on general seats and they took oath on 6 August 1975 as the only two women members out of 45 in the Senate for the term (1975–1977).

No woman was elected to the Senate for the term from 1985 to 1988.

Senator Dr. Noor Jahan Panezai took oath on 21 March 1988 as the only woman member in the Senate of Pakistan for the term from 1988-1991. She was also elected as the first woman deputy chairman Senate in 1991.

Dr. Noor Jahan Panezai was the only woman member elected as a senator for the term from 1991 to 1994.

Senators Fiza Junejo and Nasreen Jalil were elected as the members of the Senate for the term (1994–1997).

Nasreen Jalil was the only woman member elected as a senator for the term from 1997 to 2000.

As a result of the constitutional amendment that raised the membership of the Senate from 87 to 100 in 2002, 17 women were elected on reserved seats to serve in the Senate for the term from 2003 to 2006.

Twenty-one (21) women including 17 on reserved seats and 4 on general seats were elected as senators who served for the term from 2003 to 2009.

There were nineteen (19) women in the Senate including seventeen elected on reserved seats and two elected on general seats for the term from 2015 to 2018.

=== Current representation (2018 to date) ===
==== National Assembly (2018–2023) ====
The image represents the total number of seats in the national assembly of Pakistan

Sixty-nine (69) women out of 342 members are serving in the National Assembly of Pakistan. Of the total 69, sixty (60) women MNAs were elected on the reserved seats for women, and one (1) was elected on seats reserved for minorities, whereas eight (8) women MNAs were directly elected on general seats in the elections held in 2018. They include; Mehnaz Akber Aziz, Ghulam Bibi Bharwana, Zartaj Gul, Dr. Nafisa Shah, Shazia Marri, Dr. Fehmida Mirza, Shams un Nisa, and Zubaida Jalal Khan.

==== Senate ====
The image represents the number of members in the Senate

Senators are elected for six year terms, half of which are elected every three years. Currently there are twenty (20) women members out of a total of 104 Senators. Of these 11 began their term in 2015 while the remaining 9 began their term in 2018. Of these women, seventeen (17) were elected on reserved seats for women, while two (2) were elected on general seats: Sherry Rehman and Khushbakht Shujaat and the remain one (1) on the seat for technocrats: Engr. Rukhsana Zuberi.

==== Federal Cabinet ====
Twenty-seven (27) federal ministers are serving at the different ministries of the Government of Pakistan, out of which three (3) women hold the position of federal ministers. Dr. Shireen M. Mazari is heading the Ministry of Human Rights, Zubaida Jalal is serving as Federal Minister for Defence Production, Dr. Fehmida Mirza is heading the Inter-Provincial Coordination Division, whereas Zartaj Gul is serving as the Minister of State for Climate Change.

There are thirty-six (36) parliamentary secretaries who are serving at different ministries and divisions of the government of Pakistan, out of which fourteen (14) positions are held by women. The women MNAs with their portfolios are: Rukhsana Naveed for Climate Change, Rubina Jamil for Defence Production, Wajiha Akram for Federal Education & Professional Training, Andleeb Abbas for Foreign Affairs, Tashfeen Safdar for Housing & Works, Syma Nadeem for Inter-Provincial Coordination, Sobia Kamal Khan for Kashmir Affairs and Gilgit Baltistan, Maleeka Ali Bukhari for Law and Justice, Dr. Nausheen Hamid for National Health Services, Regulations & Coordination, Ghazala Saifi for National History and Literary Heritage Division, Javaria Zafar Aheer for Overseas Pakistanis and Human Resource Development, Kanwal Shauzab for Planning, Development and Reform, Shunila Ruth for Religious Affairs and Interfaith Harmony, and Aliya Hamza Malik for Textile, Commerce, Industries & Production and Board of Investment.

==== Women heading the Committees of the Parliament ====
There are 34 Standing Committees of the National Assembly, out of which only two are headed by the women MNAs. Kishwar Zehra is serving as the chairperson of the Committee on Cabinet Secretariat, whereas Munaza Hassan is the chairperson of the Committee on Climate Change.

Out of the 50 different committees of the Senate, ten (10) are presided over by women members. Of thirty (30) Standing Committees of the Senate, six (6) are headed by women. The women senators with their portfolios are: Sitara Ayaz for Climate Change, Rahila Magsi for Federal Education, Professional Training, National History & Literary Heritage, Rubina Khalid for Information Technology and Telecommunication, Khushbakht Shujat for National Health Services Regulations and Coordination, Nuzhat Sadiq for Maritime Affairs, and Sassui Palijo for Parliamentary Affairs.

Senator Ayesha Raza Farooq is the chairperson for the Other Committee on Rules of Procedure and Privileges, and Senator Rubina Khalid is serving as the chair for the Special Committee on Child Protection, while Senator Sherry Rehman is heading two committees including a Special Committee on China Pak Economic Corridor (CPEC) and a Domestic Committee on Climate Change Caucus.

Of ten Parliamentary committees, only three are headed by women MNAs. Shunila Ruth is chairing the committee formed for the appointment of chairperson and members of the National Commission for Human Rights, and Dr. Shireen M. Mazari is the chairperson of the committee established for the appointment of chief election commissioner and members of the Election Commission of Pakistan, whereas Prof. Dr. Mehr Taj Roghani is serving as the chairperson of the committee set up for the appointment of the chairperson of the National Commission on the Status of Women.

Fatima Jinnah

== Women political office-holders in Pakistan ==
- Fatima Jinnah served as the first woman Leader of the Opposition from 1 January 1960 to 9 July 1967.
- Benazir Bhutto was elected as the first woman prime minister of Pakistan and the Muslim world in 1988. She took oath as the 11th prime minister of Pakistan on 2 December 1988. She was re-elected for another term as the prime minister in 1993.
- Benazir Bhutto served as the Leader of the Opposition in the National Assembly for the two terms i.e. from 6 November 1990 to 18 July 1993, and from 17 February 1997 to 12 October 1999, when Nawaz Sharif was the prime minister of Pakistan.

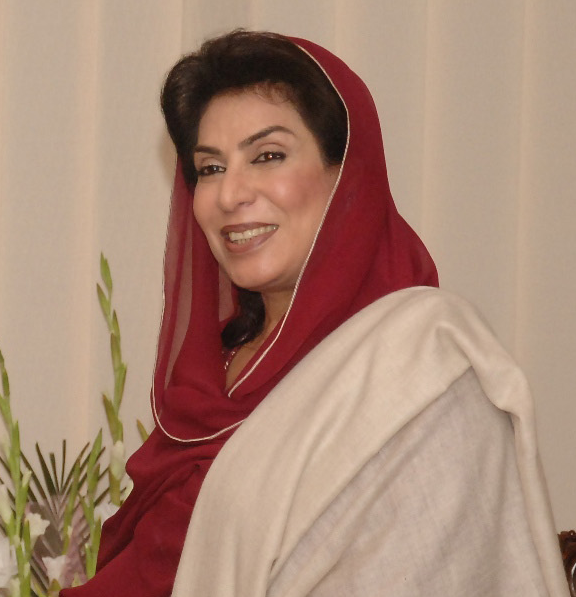
Fehmida Mirza

- Dr. Fehmida Mirza took oath as the 18th Speaker of the National Assembly on 19 March 2013. She was the first woman speaker in the National Assembly of Pakistan and the Muslim world elected to the office of the speaker.
- Mrs. Ashraf Khatoon Abbasi took oath as the 9th Deputy Speaker of the National Assembly of Pakistan on 11 August 1973. She was the first woman Deputy Speaker of the National Assembly. She was again elected as a Deputy Speaker of the National Assembly on 3 December 1988. She served for two terms i.e. from 1973 to 1977 and again from 1988 to 1990.
- Dr. Noor Jehan Panezai took oath as the 7th Deputy Chairman of the National Assembly of Pakistan on 21 March 1991. She was the first woman deputy chairman Senate of Pakistan who served in the office from 21 March 1991 to 20 March 1994.
- In March 2018, Senator Sherry Rehman became the first woman Leader of the Opposition in the Senate.

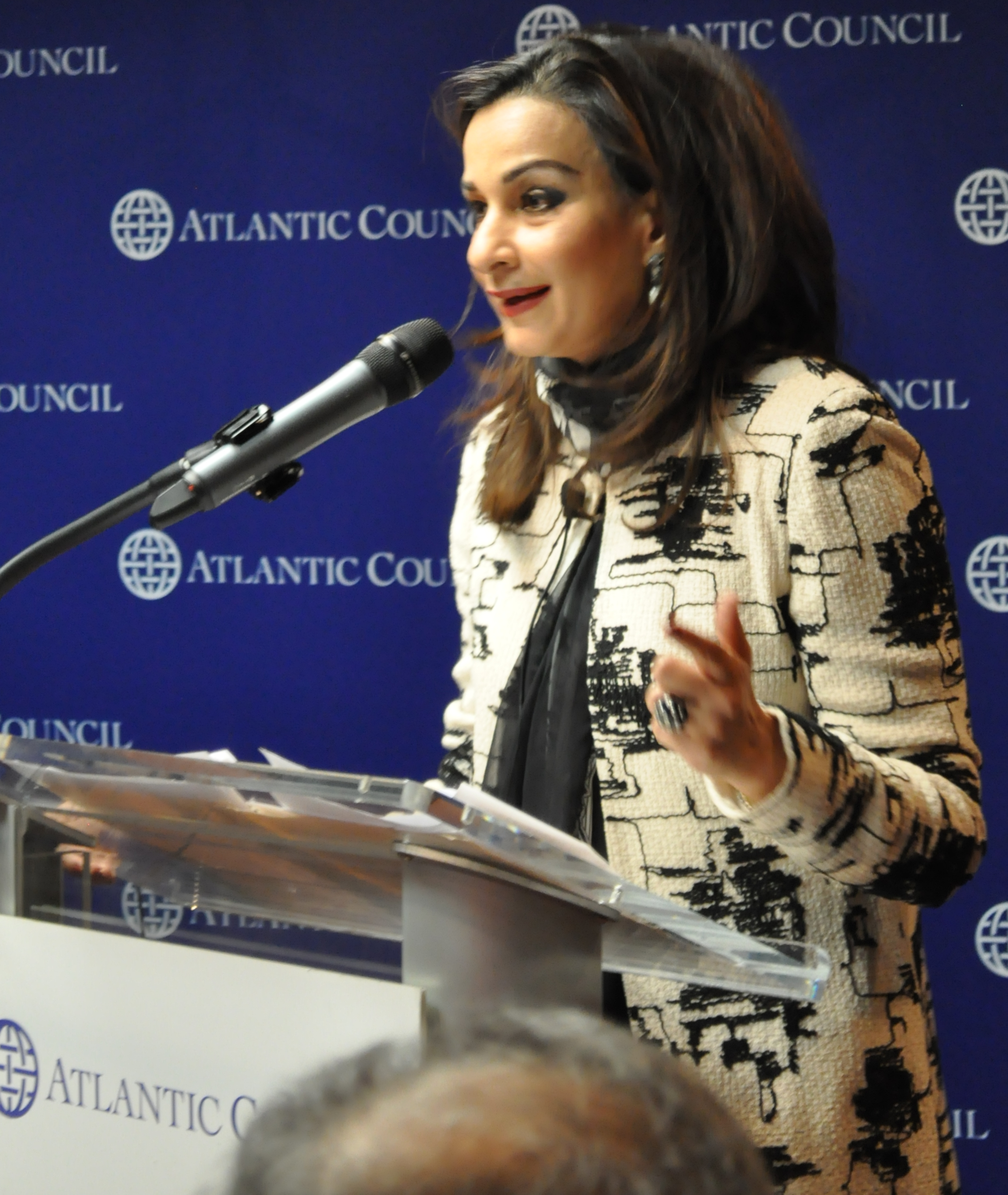
Sherry Rehman

- Rahila Durrani was elected as the first female Deputy Speaker of the Provincial Assembly of Balochistan on 24 December 2015, who served in the office till 16 August 2018.
- Dr. Meher Taj Roghani was the first female Deputy Speaker in the Provincial Assembly of Khyber Pakhtunkhwa, who performed her responsibilities from 11 December 2015 to 28 May 2018.
- Shehla Raza served for the two consecutive terms in the office of Deputy Speaker at Provincial Assembly of Sindh. She assumed responsibilities in the office for the first term from 7 April 2008 to 19 March 2013, and from 30 May 2013 to 28 May 2018 for the second term.
- Rehana Leghari is serving as the Deputy Speaker at Provincial Assembly of Sindh, who assumed her responsibilities on 15 August 2018.
- Maryam Nawaz is serving as the Chief Minister of Punjab, assuming her responsibilities on 26 February 2024.
- Suraya Bibi is serving as the Deputy Speaker at Provincial Assembly of Khyber Pakhtunkhwa who assumed her responsibilities on 29 February 2024.

== Women's Parliamentary Caucus ==
Women's Parliamentary Caucus (WPC) is a non-partisan informal forum for women parliamentarians of Pakistan. It was established on 21 November 2008 through a unanimous resolution passed by the Women Parliamentarians beyond party lines.

Former speaker National Assembly of Pakistan Dr. Fehmida Mirza is the patron in-chief of the caucus. Dr. Nafisa Shah hailing from Pakistan Peoples Party Parliamentarians was the first Secretary of Women's Parliamentary Caucus. In 2013, after the change in the federal government, MNA Shaista Pervaiz Malik from Pakistan Muslim League Nawaz became the Secretary of Women's Parliamentary Caucus. Following the 2018 general elections, MNA Munaza Hasan from Pakistan Tehreek-e-Insaf became the third Secretary of the caucus.

== Performance of Women Parliamentarians in the Parliament of Pakistan ==
Women parliamentarians have demonstrated strong presence in the legislative bodies. The data relating to legislative business of both the National Assembly and the Senate show that from 2016–2017, percentage of women legislators' contribution to parliamentary business was remarkably high in the Lower House where nearly two thirds (62%) business was originated by women individually and 3% in collaboration with their male colleagues. In the Upper House, women sponsored 13% parliamentary business individually and 2% jointly with their male counterparts. The current level of women's representation in the national and provincial legislatures of Pakistan is amongst the top in the region.

With 20 percent representation in each house of the Parliament, women parliamentarians contributed 33 percent of parliamentary business (2018–19). Women Parliamentarians moved 39 out of 74 private members' bills, 27 out of 100 resolutions, 51 out of 108 Calling Attention Notices, and 561 out of 1772 questions in both Houses of the Parliament in an attempt to improve livelihood of the masses.

== Obstacles to women's effective participation in parliament ==
Women parliamentarians continue to face numerous obstacles including the prevalent socio-cultural taboos in the society and the high costs of running successful election campaigns that restrict women to contest elections and dominance of familial linkages in awarding party tickets to women.

The women legislators elected through indirect mode of election undermine their credibility and effectiveness as politicians. They are largely ignored in decision-making process within their political parties and during the proceedings of the legislative assemblies for lack of their own electorate or constituency like the male counterparts.

The women politicians elected on reserved seats have to face hurdles in their effective and substantive participation in legislative assemblies for lack of experience of canvassing, and lack of understanding of issues, legislation or policies which result in their exclusion from powerful political domains, such as standing committees of legislative bodies and decision-making process within political parties.
