= Matloob =

Matloob is an Urdu given name and surname. Notable people with the name include:

- Matloob Inkalabi, Pakistani politician
- Nawabzada Raja Matloob Mehdi, Pakistani politician
- Samina Matloob, Pakistani politician
