= Jamshed Thomas =

Pakistani politician 1970-2025

Member of the National Assembly of Pakistan
- In office 13 August 2018 – 25 January 2023
- Constituency: Reserved seat for minorities

Personal details
- Born: 25 December 1970 Peshawar, Pakistan
- Died: 22 May 2025 (aged 54) Peshawar, Pakistan
- Party: PTI (2011-2025)

Jamshed Thomas (Urdu: جمشید تھامس) (25 December 1970 - 22 May 2025) was a Pakistani politician who had been a member of the National Assembly of Pakistan from August 2018 till January 2023.

== Political career ==
He was elected to the National Assembly of Pakistan as a candidate of Pakistan Tehreek-e-Insaf on a reserved seat for minorities in the 2018 Pakistani general election.

=== Resignation ===
In April 2022, he also resigned from the National Assembly seat along with all Tehreek-e-Insaaf members after the ouster of Imran Khan.

== More Reading ==
- List of members of the 15th National Assembly of Pakistan
- List of Pakistan Tehreek-e-Insaf elected members (2013–2018)
- No-confidence motion against Imran Khan
