= Saima Nadeem =

Pakistani politician

Federal Parliamentary Secretary for Inter Provincial Coordination
- In office November 2018 – 10 April 2022
- Prime Minister: Imran Khan

Member of the National Assembly of Pakistan
- In office 13 August 2018 – 25 January 2023
- Constituency: Reserved seat for women

Personal details
- Party: PPP (2025-present)
- Other political affiliations: IPP (2023-2025); PTI (2018-2023)

Saima Nadeem (Urdu: صائمہ ندیم) is a Pakistani politician who had been a member of the National Assembly of Pakistan from August 2018 till January 2023.

== Political career ==
She was elected to the National Assembly of Pakistan as a candidate of Pakistan Tehreek-e-Insaf (PTI) on a reserved seat for women from Sindh in the 2018 Pakistani general election.

In November 2018, she was appointed as Federal Parliamentary Secretary for Inter Provincial Coordination.

In April 2022, she resigned from the National Assembly seat along with all PTI members.

She left the PTI on 24 May 2023 due to the 2023 Pakistani protests.

== See also ==
- List of members of the 15th National Assembly of Pakistan
- List of Pakistan Tehreek-e-Insaf elected members (2013–2018)
- No-confidence motion against Imran Khan
