= Naureen =

Naureen is a given name. Notable people with the name include:

- Naureen Farouq Ibrahim (fl. 2018), Pakistani politician

== See also ==
- Maureen
- Noreen (given name)
