= Kishwer =

Kishwer is a feminine given name. Notable people with the name include:

- Kishwer Falkner, Baroness Falkner of Margravine (born 1955), British politician and life peer
- Kishwer Merchant (born 1981), Indian actress and model
- Kishwer Zehra, 21st century Pakistani politician
