= Shaheen Naz Saifullah =

Pakistani politician

Member of the National Assembly of Pakistan
- In office 27 September 2018 – 25 January 2023
- Constituency: Reserved seat for women

Personal details
- Party: PTI (2018-present)

Shaheen Naz Saifullah (Urdu: شاہین ناز سیف اللہ) is a Pakistani politician who had been a member of the National Assembly of Pakistan from September 2018 till January 2023.

== Political career ==
She was elected to the National Assembly of Pakistan as a candidate of Pakistan Tehreek-e-Insaf on a reserved seat for women from Khyber Pakhtunkhwa on 27 September 2018.

=== Resignation ===
In April 2022, she also resigned from the National Assembly seat along with all Tehreek-e-Insaaf members after the Foreign-imposed Regime Change by the United States.

== More Reading ==
- List of members of the 15th National Assembly of Pakistan
- List of Pakistan Tehreek-e-Insaf elected members (2013–2018)
- No-confidence motion against Imran Khan
