= Rubina Jamil =

Pakistani politician

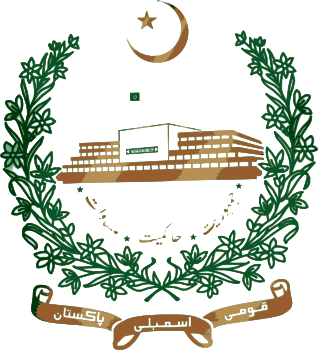

Federal Parliamentary Secretary for Defence Production
- In office 27 September 2018 – 10 April 2022
- Prime Minister: Imran Khan

Member of the National Assembly of Pakistan
- In office 13 August 2018 – 25 January 2023
- Constituency: Reserved seat for women

Personal details
- Party: PTI (2018-present)

Rubina Jamil (Urdu: روبینہ جمیل) is a Pakistani politician who had been a member of the National Assembly of Pakistan from August 2018 till January 2023.

== Political career ==
She was elected to the National Assembly of Pakistan as a candidate of Pakistan Tehreek-e-Insaf (PTI) on a reserved seat for women from Punjab in the 2018 Pakistani general election.

On 27 September 2018, Prime Minister Imran Khan appointed her as Federal Parliamentary Secretary for Defence Production.

== More Reading ==
- List of members of the 15th National Assembly of Pakistan
- List of Pakistan Tehreek-e-Insaf elected members (2013–2018)
- No-confidence motion against Imran Khan
