= Attaullah Niazi =

Pakistani politician

Member of the National Assembly of Pakistan
- In office 13 August 2018 – 17 January 2023
- Constituency: NA-250 (Karachi West-III)

Personal details
- Born: Karachi, Sindh, Pakistan
- Party: PTI (2018-present)

Attaullah Niazi (Urdu: عطاء اللہ نیازی) is a Pakistani politician who was a member of the National Assembly of Pakistan from August 2018 until January 2023.

== Political career ==
He was elected to the National Assembly of Pakistan from Constituency NA-250 (Karachi West-III) as a candidate of Pakistan Tehreek-e-Insaf in the 2018 Pakistani general election.

== See also ==
- List of members of the 15th National Assembly of Pakistan
- List of Pakistan Tehreek-e-Insaf elected members (2013–2018)
- No-confidence motion against Imran Khan
