= Naureen Farouq Ibrahim =

Pakistani politician

Naureen Farooq Ibrahim

Member of the National Assembly of Pakistan
- In office 13 August 2018 – 25 January 2023

Personal details
- Party: PTI (2018-present)

Naureen Farooq Ibrahim (Urdu: نورین فاروق ابراہیم) is a Pakistani politician who has been a member of the National Assembly of Pakistan since August 2018.

== Education ==
She has a degree of Bachelor of Arts (Hons).

== Political career ==
She was elected to the National Assembly of Pakistan as a candidate of Pakistan Tehreek-e-Insaf (PTI) on a reserved seat for women from Khyber Pakhtunkhwa in the 2018 Pakistani general election.

=== Resignation ===
In April 2022, she also resigned from the National Assembly seat along with all Tehreek-e-Insaaf members after the PTI's boycott decision.

== More Reading ==
- List of members of the 15th National Assembly of Pakistan
- List of Pakistan Tehreek-e-Insaf elected members (2013–2018)
- No-confidence motion against Imran Khan
