= Javeria Zafar =

Pakistani politician

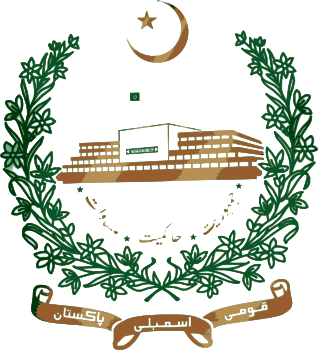

Federal Parliamentary Secretary for Information and Broadcasting
- In office 27 September 2018 – 10 August 2023
- President: Nawaz Sharif; Asif Ali Zardari
- Prime Minister: Imran Khan; Shehbaz Sharif; Shahid Khaqan Abbasi

Member of the National Assembly of Pakistan
- In office 13 August 2018 – 10 August 2023
- Constituency: Reserved seat for women

Personal details
- Party: PTI (2018-present)

Javeria Zafar (Urdu: جویریہ ظفر) is a Pakistani politician who had been a member of the National Assembly of Pakistan from August 2018 till August 2023.

== Political career ==
She was elected to the National Assembly of Pakistan as a candidate of Pakistan Tehreek-e-Insaf (PTI) on a reserved seat for women from Punjab in the 2018 Pakistani general election.

On 27 September 2018, Prime Minister Imran Khan appointed her as Federal Parliamentary Secretary for Information and Broadcasting.

=== Resignation ===
In April 2022, she also resigned from the National Assembly seat along with most Tehreek-e-Insaaf members after the Vote of No Confidence against PTI.

== More Reading ==
- List of members of the 15th National Assembly of Pakistan
- List of Pakistan Tehreek-e-Insaf elected members (2013–2018)
- No-confidence motion against Imran Khan
