= Jai Parkash Ukrani =

Pakistani politician

Member of the National Assembly of Pakistan
- In office 13 August 2018 – 25 January 2023
- Constituency: Reserved seat for minorities

Personal details
- Party: TLP (2025–present)
- Other political affiliations: IPP (2023–2025); PTI (2018–2023)

Jai Parkash Ukrani (Urdu: جے پرکاش اکرانی) is a Pakistani politician who had been a member of the National Assembly of Pakistan from August 2018 till January 2023.

== Political career ==
Jai Parkash Ukrani was elected to the National Assembly of Pakistan as a candidate of Pakistan Tehreek-e-Insaf (PTI) on a reserved seat for minorities in the 2018 Pakistani general election.

On 20 May 2023, he left the PTI due to the 2023 Pakistani protests.

== See also ==
- List of members of the 15th National Assembly of Pakistan
- List of Pakistan Tehreek-e-Insaf elected members (2013–2018)
