= Munawara Bibi Baloch =

Pakistani politician

Member of the National Assembly of Pakistan
- In office 13 August 2018 – 20 January 2023
- Constituency: Reserved seat for women

Personal details
- Party: PTI (2018-present)

Munawara Bibi Baloch is a Pakistani politician who had been a member of the National Assembly of Pakistan from August 2018 till January 2023. She is also the head of the party's provincial women's wing.

== Political career ==
She was elected to the National Assembly of Pakistan as a candidate of Pakistan Tehreek-e-Insaf (PTI) on a reserved seat for women from Balochistan in the 2018 Pakistani general election.
