= James Iqbal =

Pakistani politician

Member of the National Assembly of Pakistan
- In office 13 August 2018 – 10 August 2023
- Constituency: Reserved seat for minorities

Personal details
- Party: Jamiat Ulema-e-Islam (F)

James Iqbal (Urdu: جیمز اقبال) is a Pakistani politician who had been a member of the National Assembly of Pakistan from August 2018 till August 2023.

== Political career ==
He was elected to the National Assembly of Pakistan as a candidate of Muttahida Majlis-e-Amal on a reserved seat for minorities in the 2018 Pakistani general election.

On 13 May 2024, the Election Commission of Pakistan (ECP) suspended his membership as a member of the National Assembly. This action followed a Supreme Court of Pakistan decision to suspend the verdict of the Peshawar High Court, which had denied the allocation of a reserved seat to the PTI-Sunni Ittehad Council bloc.
