= Matloob Inkalabi =

Pakistani politician (died 2020)

Muhammad Matloob Inkalabi

Member of the Azad Jammu & Kashmir Legislative Assembly
- In office 2011–2016
- Constituency: LA-13 Khuiratta (Kotli District)

Minister for Higher Education, IT & TEVTA, AJK
- In office 2011–2016

Personal details
- Born: Kotli District, Azad Jammu and Kashmir, Pakistan
- Died: November 30th 2020 CMH Rawalpindi, Pakistan
- Party: Pakistan Peoples Party (PPP)
- Occupation: Politician

Muhammad Matloob Inkalabi (died 30 November 2020) was a Pakistani Kashmiri politician from the town of Khuiratta in Azad Jammu & Kashmir (AJK). He was a senior leader of the Pakistan Peoples Party (PPP), a two-time member of the AJK Council, and served as AJK’s Minister for Higher Education, Information Technology, and TEVTA from 2011 to 2016. He represented the “”LA-13 Khuiratta”” constituency in the AJK Legislative Assembly.

== Early life and education ==
Matloob Inkalabi was born in Kotli District, Azad Jammu & Kashmir, into a farming family. He completed a Master of Business Administration (MBA) and later obtained an LLB degree in Karachi.

He began his political involvement through the PPP’s student wing, the Peoples Students Federation (PSF), during the 1980s.

== Political career ==
=== AJK Council ===
In 1995, Inkalabi was elected to the AJK Council, serving two consecutive terms. He was later appointed Adviser to the AJK Council by then-Prime Minister Benazir Bhutto.

=== Legislative Assembly (LA-13 Khuiratta) ===
In 2011, he was elected as Member of the Legislative Assembly (MLA) from **LA-13 Khuiratta**, a constituency covering the border town of Khuiratta in Kotli District.

=== Minister for Higher Education, IT & TEVTA ===
From 2011 to 2016, Inkalabi served as Minister for Higher Education, Information Technology, and Technical Education & Vocational Training Authority (TEVTA).

He also headed the committee responsible for drafting proposals for the 13th Amendment to the AJK Constitution.

=== Party leadership ===
Throughout his career, he remained a loyal and influential figure within the Pakistan Peoples Party in Azad Kashmir. He served the Pakistan Peoples Party as Secretary Information and later as Senior Vice President of the Pakistan Peoples Party Azad Jammu and Kashmir. .

== Illness and death ==
In late October 2020, Inkalabi tested positive for COVID-19 and went into home isolation. On 27 November 2020, he reportedly fell on the terrace of his home during isolation, sustaining severe head injuries. He was airlifted to CMH Rawalpindi, underwent surgery, but never regained consciousness. He died on 30 November 2020.

His funeral in Khuiratta was attended by thousands, including senior PPP leadership and notable figures of AJK.

== Legacy ==
Matloob Inkalabi is remembered for strengthening the education and IT sectors in AJK, his commitment to democratic politics, and his long-standing loyalty to the PPP. His death was widely mourned across Azad Kashmir, especially in Khuiratta and Kotli District.
