= Shahida Begum =

Pakistani politician

Member of the National Assembly of Pakistan
- In office 13 August 2018 – 10 August 2023
- Constituency: Reserved seat for women

Personal details
- Party: JUI (F) (2018-present)

Shahida Begum is a Pakistani politician who had been a member of the National Assembly of Pakistan from August 2018 till August 2023.

== Education ==
She has a degree of masters in Chemistry and a Bachelor of Education.

== Political career ==
She was elected to the National Assembly of Pakistan as a candidate of Muttahida Majlis-e-Amal on a reserved seat for women from Khyber Pakhtunkhwa in the 2018 Pakistani general election.
