= Shahnaz Naseer Baloch =

Pakistani politician

Member of the National Assembly of Pakistan
- In office 13 August 2018 – 10 August 2023
- Constituency: Reserved seat for women

Personal details
- Party: BNP(M) (2018-present)

Shahnaz Naseer Baloch is a Pakistani politician who had been a member of the National Assembly of Pakistan from August 2018 till August 2023.

== Political career ==
She was elected to the National Assembly of Pakistan as a candidate of Balochistan National Party (Mengal) on a reserved seat for women from Balochistan in the 2018 Pakistani general election.
