= Wajiha Qamar =

Pakistani politician

Wajiha Akram

Federal Parliamentary Secretary for Federal Education and Professional Training
- In office 27 September 2018 – 10 April 2022
- Prime Minister: Imran Khan

Member of the National Assembly of Pakistan
- In office 13 August 2018 – 10 August 2023
- Constituency: Reserved seat for women

Personal details
- Party: IPP (2026-present)
- Other political affiliations: PMLN (2023-2026); PTI (2018-2022)

Wajiha Akram is a Pakistani politician who had been a member of the National Assembly of Pakistan on Pakistan Tehreek-e-Insaf (PTI) reserved seat for women from August 2018 till August 2023.

== Political career ==
She was elected to the National Assembly of Pakistan as a candidate of Pakistan Tehreek-e-Insaf (PTI) on a reserved seat for women from Punjab in the 2018 Pakistani general election.

On 27 September 2018, Prime Minister Imran Khan appointed her as Federal Parliamentary Secretary for Federal Education and Professional Training.

She had become a dissident in April 2022 during the no-confidence motion against Imran Khan. She was officially removed from the party on 2 August 2023.

On 29 October 2023, she joined the Pakistan Muslim League (N) (PML(N)).

She took oath as Minister of State in the PMLN cabinet on 27 February 2025.
