= Noor Jehan Panezai =

Dr. Noor Jehan Panezai served as the Deputy Chairman of the Senate of Pakistan from 21 March 1991 to 20 March 1994. She was the first woman to hold the office.

She died on 30 August 2014.
