= Maleeka Bokhari =

Pakistani politician

Federal Parliamentary Secretary for Law and Justice
- In office 7 September 2018 – 10 April 2022
- Prime Minister: Imran Khan

Member of the National Assembly of Pakistan
- In office 13 August 2018 – 20 January 2023
- Constituency: Reserved seat for women

Personal details
- Born: 24 August 1984 (age 42)
- Other political affiliations: PTI (2018-2023)
- Height: 1.78 m (5 ft 10 in) (5’10)
- Education: Cardiff University; University of the West of England

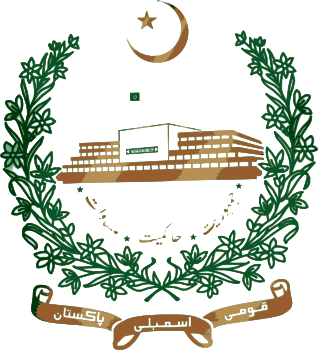
Emblem of National Assembly of Pakistan

Maleeka Ali Bokhari (born 24 August 1984) is a Pakistani politician who had been a member of the National Assembly of Pakistan from August 2018 to January 2023 and served as the Parliamentary Secretary for Law and Justice from September 2018 till April 2022.

== Political career ==
She was elected to the National Assembly of Pakistan as a candidate of Pakistan Tehreek-e-Insaaf (PTI) on a reserved seat for women from Punjab in the 2018 Pakistani general election.

On 7 September 2018, Prime Minister Imran Khan appointed her as Parliamentary Secretary for Law and Justice.

Following arrests on 12 May and on 17 May, Bokhari resigned from PTI on 25 May 2023.
