= Tashfeen Safdar =

Pakistani politician

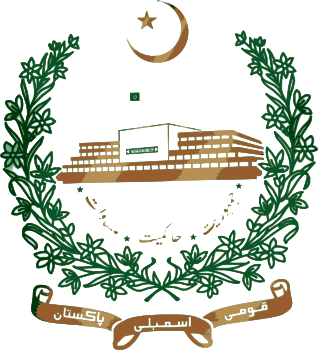

Federal Parliamentary Secretary for Housing and Works
- In office 27 September 2018 – 10 April 2022
- Prime Minister: Imran Khan

Member of the National Assembly of Pakistan
- In office 13 August 2018 – 25 January 2023
- Constituency: Reserved seat for women

Personal details
- Party: PTI (2018-present)

Tashfeen Safdar is a Pakistani politician who had been a member of the National Assembly of Pakistan from August 2018 till January 2023.

== Family ==
She is the granddaughter of the former President of Pakistan Fazal Elahi Chaudhry who was first President under the constitution of 1973 and the daughter of Chaudhry Safdar who was the MPA from Pakistan people’s party.

== Political career ==
She was elected to the National Assembly of Pakistan as a candidate of Pakistan Tehreek-e-Insaf (PTI) on a reserved seat for women from Punjab in the 2018 Pakistani general election.

On 27 September 2018, Prime Minister Imran Khan appointed her as Federal Parliamentary Secretary for Housing and Works.
