= Sobia Kamal Khan =

Pakistani politician

Federal Parliamentary Secretary for Kashmir Affairs and Gilgit Baltistan
- In office 27 September 2018 – 10 April 2022
- Prime Minister: Imran Khan

Member of the National Assembly of Pakistan
- In office 13 August 2018 – 25 January 2023
- Constituency: Reserved seat for women

Personal details
- Party: PTI (2018-present)

Sobia Kamal (Urdu: ثوبیہ کمال خان) is a Pakistani politician had been a member of the National Assembly of Pakistan from August 2018 till January 2023.

== Political career ==
She was elected to the National Assembly of Pakistan as a candidate of Pakistan Tehreek-e-Insaf (PTI) on a reserved seat for women from Punjab in the 2018 Pakistani general election.

During her tenure as Member of the National Assembly, she served as Federal Parliamentary Secretary for Kashmir Affairs and Gilgit Baltistan.
