= Kishwer Zehra =

Pakistani politician

Member of the National Assembly of Pakistan
- In office 13 August 2018 – 10 August 2023
- Constituency: Reserved seat for women (Sindh)
- In office 17 March 2008 – 31 May 2018
- Constituency: Reserved seat for women (Sindh)

Personal details
- Born: Karachi, Sindh, Pakistan
- Party: MQM-P (2018-present)
- Other political affiliations: MQM-L (2008-2018)

Kishwer Zehra (Urdu: کشور زہرہ) is a Pakistani politician who had been a member of the National Assembly of Pakistan from August 2018 till August 2023. Previously she was member of the National Assembly from March 2008 to May 2018.

== Political career ==
Zehra was elected to the National Assembly of Pakistan as a candidate of Muttahida Qaumi Movement (MQM) from Sindh in the 2008 Pakistani general election. She was re-elected to the National Assembly as a candidate of MQM from Sindh in the 2013 Pakistani general election as well as to the National Assembly as a candidate of MQM-P from Sindh in the 2018 Pakistani general election.

In 2019, Zehra submitted a bill in the National Assembly which sought the creation of eight new provinces in Pakistan. It was met with great criticism from the Pakistan Peoples Party at centre and in Sindh. On 27 July 2020, Zehra was unanimously elected chairperson of the standing committee on cabinet secretariat.

In the previous parliament, she was nominated for the office of the prime minister of Pakistan, when Nawaz Sharif was disqualified by the Supreme Court of Pakistan amid the Panama Papers Case. She later withdrew her name from consideration to become the prime minister in favour of PML-N's Shahid Khaqan Abbasi. He was sworn in as the new prime minister on 1 August 2017.

She is one of the candidates for the office of the governor of Sindh being considered by the federal government after the resignation of Imran Ismail, who resigned in protest against the ouster of former prime minister Imran Khan.

== Controversies ==
It was reported by DAWN News, in 2012, that she had amassed a fortune of PKR 60 Million, with a further USD 42,000 sitting in bank accounts with none of the assets in her own name but in the name of her family members.
