= Aliya Hamza Malik =

Pakistani politician

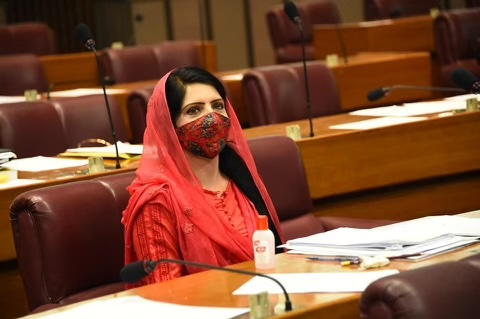

Member of the National Assembly of Pakistan
- In office 13 August 2018 – 17 January 2023
- Constituency: Reserved seat for women

Chief Organizer PTI, Punjab
- Incumbent
- Assumed office 27 January 2025

Personal details
- Party: PTI (2018-present)

Aliya Hamza Malik (عالیہ حمزہ ملک) is a Pakistani politician and activist member of the Pakistan Tehreek-e-Insaf (PTI). She was a Member of the National Assembly of Pakistan from August 2018 to 17 January 2023.

== Political career ==
She was elected to the National Assembly of Pakistan as a candidate of Pakistan Tehreek-e-Insaf (PTI) on a reserved seat for women from Punjab in the 2018 Pakistani general election.

On 27 September 2018, Prime Minister Imran Khan appointed her as Federal Parliamentary Secretary for Textile.

On 17 January 2023, the Speaker of the National Assembly, Raja Pervez Ashraf, accepted Malik's resignation from the National Assembly. Subsequently, the Election Commission of Pakistan (ECP) de-notified her as a member of the National Assembly.

She ran as an independent candidate supported by PTI in the 2024 Pakistani general election from NA-118 Lahore-II, but was unsuccessful, receiving 100,984 votes. The seat was won by Hamza Shahbaz of Pakistan Muslim League (N) (PML(N)), who received 105,948 votes. In March 2024, she challenged Hamza's victory notification through an election petition.

She was appointed by founding chairman PTI Imran Khan as Chief Organizer of Pakistan Tehreek e Insaf Punjab on 27 January 2025.

== Arrest ==
On 10 May 2023, she was arrested in connection with the 2023 Pakistani protests.

In March 2024, following her release from Kot Lakhpat Jail on bail related to the Shadman police station attack case, she was re-arrested in connection with a new case related to the protests.

On 7 August 2024, she was released from Gujranwala Central Jail.
