= Munaza Hassan =

Pakistani politician

Member of the National Assembly of Pakistan
- Incumbent
- Assumed office 29 February 2024
- Constituency: Reserved seat for women
- In office 13 August 2018 – 25 January 2023
- Constituency: Reserved seat for women
- In office 1 June 2013 – 31 May 2018
- Constituency: Reserved seat for women

Personal details
- Party: IPP (2023-present)
- Other political affiliations: PTI (1996-2023)

Munaza Hassan (Urdu: منزہ حسن) is a Pakistani politician who had been a member of the National Assembly of Pakistan, from August 2018 till January 2023. Previously she was a member of the National Assembly from June 2013 to May 2018.

== Political career ==
Munaza Hassan started her career in 1996 when she joined Pakistan Tehreek-e-Insaf (PTI).

She was elected to the National Assembly of Pakistan as a candidate of PTI on reserved seats for women from Punjab in the 2013 Pakistani general election.

She was re-elected to the National Assembly as a candidate of PTI on a seat reserved for women from Punjab in the 2018 Pakistani general election.
