= Shunila Ruth =

Pakistani politician

Member of the National Assembly of Pakistan
- In office 13 August 2018 – 25 January 2023
- Constituency: Reserved seat for minorities

Member of the Provincial Assembly of the Punjab
- In office 29 May 2013 – 31 May 2018
- Constituency: Reserved seat for minorities

Personal details
- Born: 30 June 1953 (age 73) Gujranwala, Punjab, Pakistan
- Party: PTI (2013-present)

Shunila Ruth (Urdu: شنیلہ روت; born 30 June 1953) is a Pakistani politician who had been a member of the National Assembly of Pakistan from August 2018 till January 2023. Previously she was a Member of the Provincial Assembly of the Punjab, from May 2013 to May 2018.

== Early life and education ==
She was born on 30 June 1953 in Gujranwala.

She graduated from Kinnaird College for Women University in 1973. She received the degree of Master of Arts in English in 1976 from Forman Christian College.

== Political career ==
She was elected to the Provincial Assembly of the Punjab as a candidate of Pakistan Tehreek-e-Insaf (PTI) on reserved seat for minorities in the 2013 Pakistani general election.

She was elected to the National Assembly of Pakistan as a candidate of PTI on a reserved seat for minorities in the 2018 Pakistani general election.
