= No-confidence motion against Imran Khan =

2022 removal of Pakistani prime minister

- Date: 10 April 2022
- Location: Parliament of Pakistan
- Outcome: Imran Khan removed from office; Shehbaz Sharif elected prime minister; Start of a nationwide protest campaign by Imran Khan against the new government and federal government

A no-confidence motion against Imran Khan of the PTI occurred on 10 April 2022 and led to his removal as the prime minister of Pakistan, as opposition parties joined forces to present the motion, which the majority passed in the National Assembly. The next day, on 11 April, Shehbaz Sharif of the PML(N) was elected prime minister by the assembly. Khan became the first prime minister in Pakistan to lose a vote of no-confidence.

The decision to file a no-confidence motion against sitting prime minister Imran Khan was taken at a summit of the opposition parties, united under the Pakistan Democratic Movement (PDM) alliance. In the leadup to the no-confidence motion, Khan's PTI also faced defections from some lawmakers within its own ranks, which emboldened the opposition's move to file the motion. On 8 March 2022, representatives of opposition parties filed the motion against Khan in the National Assembly, seeking to remove him from office, while accusing his alleged hybrid regime of poor governance, political victimisation of opponents, and mismanaging the economy and foreign policy. It is alleged that these factors also contributed to Khan's falling out with Pakistan's military establishment, which had remained a key backer of his government.

During parliamentary proceedings, on 3 April, deputy speaker Qasim Khan Suri dismissed the motion on grounds of "foreign interference", while Khan dissolved the National Assembly through president Arif Alvi, causing a constitutional crisis. (Note: Under Pakistani law,, the National Assembly can be dissolved by the president on the prime minister's advice. But, in the case of there being a no-confidence motion filed in the parliament, the assembly can not be dissolved. The deputy speaker Qasim Khan Suri's dismissal of the motion in the National Assembly prompted Imran Khan to dissolve the assembly through president Arif Alvi; but the dismissal, and hence the dissolution of the assembly, was declared 'unconstitutional' by the Supreme Court.) The Supreme Court ruled that the deputy speaker's dismissal of the motion and the dissolution of the assembly to be unconstitutional, allowing the vote to proceed. On 10 April the no-confidence motion passed with a majority of 174 votes (out of 342), which resulted in Khan losing the confidence of the house and ceasing to hold the office of prime minister. The next day, Shehbaz Sharif was elected unopposed by the National Assembly to replace Khan as prime minister. Sharif's cabinet, comprising 37 members, took oath on 19 April.

Khan initially accused the United States of seeking to oust his government, claiming a diplomatic cable as proof, however later instead claimed Army Chief General Bajwa to be responsible, not the United States.

== Background ==
Under Article 58 of the constitution of Pakistan, a Prime Minister ceases to hold office if the majority of members of the National Assembly, equating to 172 members (out of 342), vote in favour of no-confidence. A successful vote means that cabinet would also be dissolved. When the motion is successful, a new prime minister is elected by the house, for which both the ruling party and opposition usually submit nomination papers of their chosen candidates.

At the time of the motion of no confidence, Pakistan Tehreek-e-Insaf (PTI), the ruling party led by the prime minister, had a centrist coalition government, with 176 members on the treasury seats, while the combined number of opposition seats stood at 162. The total votes required to remove the prime minister are 172. Once a no-confidence motion is submitted, the Speaker must call the house to order within two weeks, and voting must take place on the motion within one week after the house is called in order.

No prime minister in Pakistan has previously been removed through a motion of no-confidence. A vote of no confidence against the premier has been tabled on two occasions before. In 1989, Benazir Bhutto survived a vote of no confidence. In 2006, Shaukat Aziz also survived a motion against him when the opposition was able to muster only 136 votes, short of the required simple majority of 172.

On 11 February 2022, Fazal-ur-Rehman, president of the Pakistan Democratic Movement, announced his intent to bring a vote of no confidence. The announcement came after a meeting of PDM's parliamentary parties. The opposition parties also decided to contact the incumbent government allies to convince them to join the vote of no confidence. The announcement came after the Pakistan Peoples Party, led by former president Asif Ali Zardari and his son Bilawal Bhutto Zardari, met Pakistan Muslim League (N)'s Shehbaz Sharif, who is Leader of the Opposition in the National Assembly, along with his niece and daughter of three-time former prime minister Nawaz Sharif, Maryam Nawaz.

In response, the federal Minister for Information, Fawad Chaudhry, accused the opposition of corruption and termed the opposition's no-confidence move a ploy to turn attention away from corruption cases that many of the opposition leaders were facing due to the charges levied against them by the National Accountability Bureau.

== Vote of no-confidence ==
Based largely on the Westminster system of legislature, the prime minister commands confidence of the majority of the lower house of Parliament, the National Assembly, under clause (2A) of Article 91 of the Constitution.

The constitution of Pakistan allows for the removal of an incumbent prime minister if a no-confidence motion gains a simple majority. If parliament is not in session, opposition parties must also requisition the Speaker of the National Assembly to summon a session; once the requisition is submitted, the speaker has a maximum of 14 days to summon the session. Once the session is in attendance, the secretary of the house will circulate the motion for the no-confidence vote, which in this instance was moved to the next working day.

Once the motion is moved, according to the rules of procedure, it cannot be voted up before three days or after seven days. The vote is conducted by an open vote by division, once the session takes place, a bell is rung to inform any parliamentarians that might be outside the assembly hall; later, the gates are closed. Those in favour of no-confidence exit the hall from one side, those not in favour exit the hall from another side; once the members of the assembly begin to leave, the counting procedure starts, everyone re-enters the hall once the hall is emptied and all members have displayed their vote by exiting the hall.

After the vote is complete, if the no-confidence motion is successful, the speaker of the house informs the president of Pakistan in writing and secretary issues a notification to the gazette.

== Events prior to the vote ==
=== Allegations that the military brought Imran Khan into power through rigging and managed and sustained his coalition ===
It was widely alleged that Imran Khan's rise to power was facilitated by the military establishment through pre‑election manipulation and post‑election coalition management. This included allegations that the military establishment had engineered defections from Nawaz Sharif's PML-N party in the lead-up to the 2018 election in order to bring Imran Khan into power. Several PML-N politicians suddenly announced plans to contest the 2018 elections as independents, leaving the party without candidates in certain seats. One PML-N candidate for the Punjab Assembly, Rana Iqbal Siraj, publicly claimed that he was tortured by personnel of an intelligence agency over his refusal to withdraw his candidacy on a PML-N ticket. Siraj later said that there had been some confusion and that it was officials of the agriculture department, not personnel of an intelligence agency, who had raided his godown. Contemporary commentaries widely viewed Siraj's retraction with suspicion of having been made under pressure. A Pakistan Today editorial said his revised explanation "looks doubtful", while PILDAT later reported that the incident led commentators in Pakistan and abroad to facetiously refer to intelligence agencies as the "agriculture department".

It was also reported that police opened criminal cases against nearly 17,000 PML-N activists during the same period. Reports of arrests and intimidation of PML-N activists and politicians fueled allegations that the military establishment was manipulating the election to bring Imran Khan into power.

Allegations included claims that after the election, the military establishment arranged for Imran Khan to get the required votes in the National Assembly to be elected Prime Minister. It was said that personelle of ISI used to make regular phone calls during Imran Khan's government to parliamentarians to "join a certain party (Imran Khan's PTI), vote a certain way" and this ended when he was ousted from power.

Khan later acknowledged that the military was heavily involved in his government and that intelligence agencies used to help him pass legislation during his tenure.

=== Reports that the military decided to stop propping up Imran Khan's government and claimed political neutrality ===
In the weeks leading up to the formal announcement of the no-confidence motion, there were growing rumors of a rupture between Imran Khan and the military establishment. These rumours had gained sufficient prominence for Khan to publicly deny that there was a rift, saying in January 2022 that the opposition's narrative of a civil-military rupture was "dead and buried" and that relations between his government and the military were "unprecedented". Subsequently, there were increasing reports in the media that the military establishment had decided to stop propping up Imran Khan's government and was now conveying to politicians that it was going politically neutral. It was believed by Khan's opposition and many independent observers that Khan did not have the numbers in the National Assembly to defeat the no-confidence motion to remain in power on his own unless the intelligence agencies continued to interfere in his favor by telling politicians to keep on supporting him.

=== Announcement of no-confidence motion ===
On 6 February 2022, opposition leaders Shehbaz Sharif (PML-N) and Bilawal Bhutto (PPP) discussed "legal, constitutional and parliamentary options" to oust the PTI government. These included proposing a motion of no-confidence against Federal and Punjab governments, with the latter to "test the waters". Dawn reported that the PPP hoped that the PML(Q) and the Jahangir Tareen group of PTI (~8 MNAs and ~30 Punjab MPAs) could be swayed against the provincial government of Punjab and was "reportedly in contact" with Tareen. However two days later the PML-N's central executive committee remained undecided on pursuing a no-confidence motion.

On 11 February 2022, the opposition parties agreed to formally submit a no-confidence motion in parliament. It was announced by PDM leader Maulana Fazlur Rehman, who also said that the PDM would approach the allied parties of the PTI-led government to try and end their coalition with it. This came after several opposition leaders said they had been deliberating on a no-confidence motion.

=== Opposition demand for military establishment's neutrality ===
On February 26, 2022, Bilawal Bhutto, the leader of the opposition Pakistan Peoples Party, claimed that if the military establishment remained neutral during the vote of no confidence, Imran Khan's government would not be able to survive.

=== Imran Khan's Demand for the military establishment's lack of neutrality ===
On March 11, 2022, Imran Khan called for the military to support him, arguing that animals cannot distinguish between good and evil, whereas humans can, and hence only animals are neutral. This statement came in the backdrop of reports that the military establishment had decided to stop artificially propping up Imran Khan's government and was now claiming that it was becoming politically neutral from now on. See also reports of the military's claimed political neutrality.

=== Imran Khan's later admission about establishment help during his rule ===
In a later statement on July 16, 2022, Imran Khan admitted that the establishment was heavily involved in his government, such as helping him bring parliamentarians to pass bills during his time in office.

=== Parliament Lodges incident ===
On 9 March 2022, members of Jamiat Ulema-e-Islam (F)'s Ansar-ul-Islam, a uniform volunteer force entered Parliament Lodges. Jamiat Ulema-e-Islam (F) maintained that force will remain inside the lodges until the no-confidence motion was passed.

On 10 March 2022, Islamabad Police conducted an operation inside Parliament Lodges and arrested 19 people, including JUI-F MNAs Maulana Salahuddin Ayyubi and Muhammad Jamal ud Din for bringing Ansar-ul-Islam's workers in the Parliament Lodges. Islamabad Inspector General of Police Muhammad Ahsan Younas suspended the officers in charge of D-Chowk under whose supervision Ansar-ul-Islam workers had entered the Parliament lodges.

Senator Kamran Murtaza along with other lawyers submitted the petition to the police station secretariat. The petition said that the policemen tortured them including Saad Rafiq, Syed Rafiullah and others, while the police did not have arrest warrants or the permission of the speaker.

The united opposition filed a privilege motion in the National Assembly against the operation, adding that a large contingent of police had infiltrated and the members of the National Assembly were arrested, beaten and their doors smashed.

Interior Minister Sheikh Rasheed Ahmad said that JUI-F's MNA Salahuddin Ayubi was not arrested, only 20 people of the "militia" involved in creating unrest at the lodges were arrested. The interior minister maintained that "it is the job of the state, not private militia to provided security to national buildings. The militia was dissolved in 2019, what you are trying to prove to bring them into the capital; we will not spare any private militia in the capital if seen in the uniform."

=== Sindh House protest ===
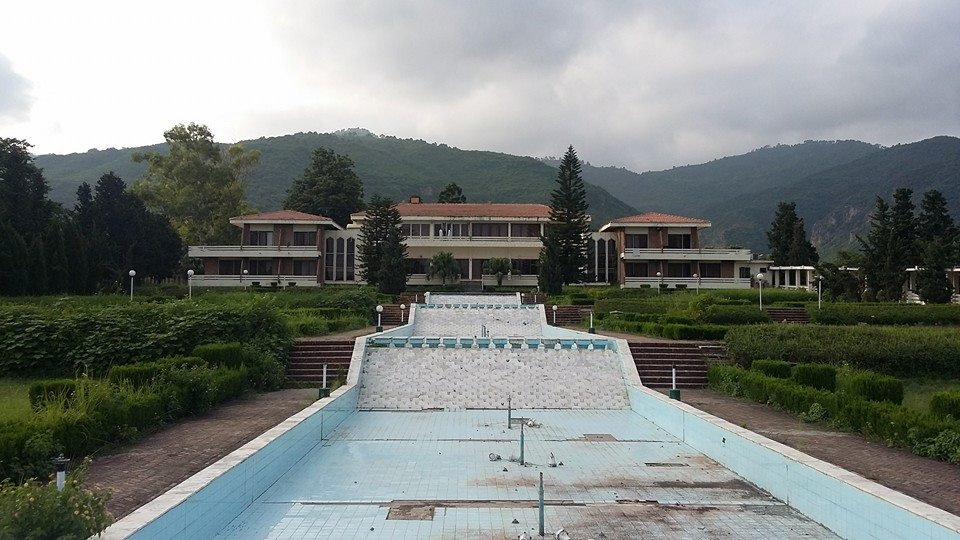
Sindh House in Islamabad (2014)

Before vote of no confidence opposition claimed that they have group of dissidents lawmakers of then ruling Pakistan Tehreek-e-Insaf, and they could have a successful vote of no confidence even without involving government allies. However, the government denied and said that they have their lawmakers with them, and if opposition alliance will buy any of them this will be unconstitutional. This tug of war continued until 12 government lawmakers were found in Sindh House 'sanctuary'. The Prime minister Imran Khan, claimed that MPs are bought with bags full of cash and this is an open horse-trading. However, the dissented law markers during their interaction with media denied the allegations and said that there was no money involved.

On 18 March 2022, PTI protesters stormed Sindh House in Islamabad and broke through the gate. Workers protested and chanted slogans against deviant members of parliament. Protesters held Ewer and sticks in their hands. Police arrested 12 people, including two PTI members of the National Assembly, Faheem Khan and Attaullah Niazi. The PTI MNAs were later released on personal bail.

PPP's Yousaf Raza Gillani, Raja Pervez Ashraf and PML-N's Shahid Khaqan Abbasi said that if there was a police operation on Sindh House then Prime Minister Imran Khan and Interior Minister Sheikh Rashid would be responsible for the results. PPP chairman Bilawal Bhutto Zardari said that Prime Minister Khan was trying to prove his "third power" by creating an unstable situation through the use of force.

=== Allies join PDM ===
On 27 March 2022, Jamhoori Watan Party's Shahzain Bugti resigned from the federal cabinet and joined forces with the PDM. On 28 March 2022, four out of five legislators of the Balochistan Awami Party, an ally party of the PTI government, announced quitting the ruling alliance in the federal government, and joined the opposition. On 30 March 2022, the Muttahida Qaumi Movement-Pakistan, another key ally of the PTI-led coalition government, formally announced that it was joining the opposition ranks. Meanwhile, MQM-P members Farogh Naseem (law minister) and Syed Aminul Haque (IT & telecommunication minister) resigned from the cabinet.

== Government response to motion ==
As pressure for the no-confidence vote built up, the prime minister and members of his cabinet came up with a multi-prong approach to tackle public opinion and reverse the pressure on the opposition. The government has planned massive public outreach rallies to turn public opinion in its favour; at these rallies, the prime minister tackled both domestic and foreign narratives.

=== Dissident members of government ===
Some disgruntled and dissident members of the ruling party allied themselves with the opposition; according to the known dissidents, total government assembly members to vote against their party's head is between 24 and 33. While the dissenting lawmakers have been termed as 'turncoats' for money and threatened, the government has issued them show-cause notices.

On 18 March 2022, PTI workers stormed Sindh House, where most of the dissident lawmakers where staying, under the leadership of loyalist PTI lawmakers Faheem Khan and Attaullah Niazi.

=== Reply to opposition ===
While addressing a political rally at Mailsi, Prime Minister Khan called the opposition leaders as cowards and corrupt. He then went on to say that Nawaz Sharif has faked his illness to run away from Pakistan and that it was one of his biggest mistake to let Nawaz Sharif go to London. Khan also accused Shehbaz Sharif, Nawaz Sharif's brother and the leader of the opposition, as a 'boot licker', a derogatory reference to a person who makes back channel deals with the country's powerful military establishment for power. Referring to former President Asif Ali Zardari, Khan reminded the crowd that the former president was known as "Mr. 10%", and he described the former president as the biggest illness of Pakistan. Fazal-ur-Rehman, another opposition leader who is not a member of the national assembly but is the president of the opposition alliance, was termed 'Diesel', the Prime minister jokingly mentioned that 'the Chief of Army Staff had asked him not to call Fazal ur Rehman 'Diesel', but he couldn't do anything since the public has named him diesel already'.

Prime Minister Khan warned the opposition to be ready to face what he will do to them, the opposition, once he defeats the vote of no confidence.

=== Meeting with allies ===
On 1 March 2022, Khan met leaders of Pakistan Muslim League (Q) to discuss the political situation in the country, with the Prime Minister asking Chaudhary Shujaat Hussain to not take up the opposition's offer to join the no-confidence motion.

On 9 March 2022, the prime minister met leaders of the MQM-P, at their headquarters in Karachi MQM-P's traditional stronghold. While talking to media, MQM-P leaders mentioned that the move of no confidence was not discussed and all their options were open. On 18 March, Khalid Maqbool Siddiqui, Convener of MQM-P, said in a TV interview that Khan should resign to save the PTI government.

=== Amar Bil Maroof rally ===
On 27 March 2022, the PTI staged a political rally at the parade ground in Islamabad, which it named the "Amar Bil Maroof rally". The rally started with a speech by KP Provincial President Pervez Khattak. Sindh President Ali Zaidi, Punjab President Shafqat Mahmood and PTI Balochistan President Qasim Suri addressed the gathering. The rally was held a day before the no-confidence motion filed against him was tabled in the National Assembly.

In his address, Khan waved a letter to the people alleging that a conspiracy was being hatched to change his government with the money coming from abroad and some Pakistanis in this conspiracy unknowingly and some deliberately are being used. He further said: "We have known for months that there is a conspiracy against the government."

=== Khan's Allegation of foreign support for the motion and later retraction ===
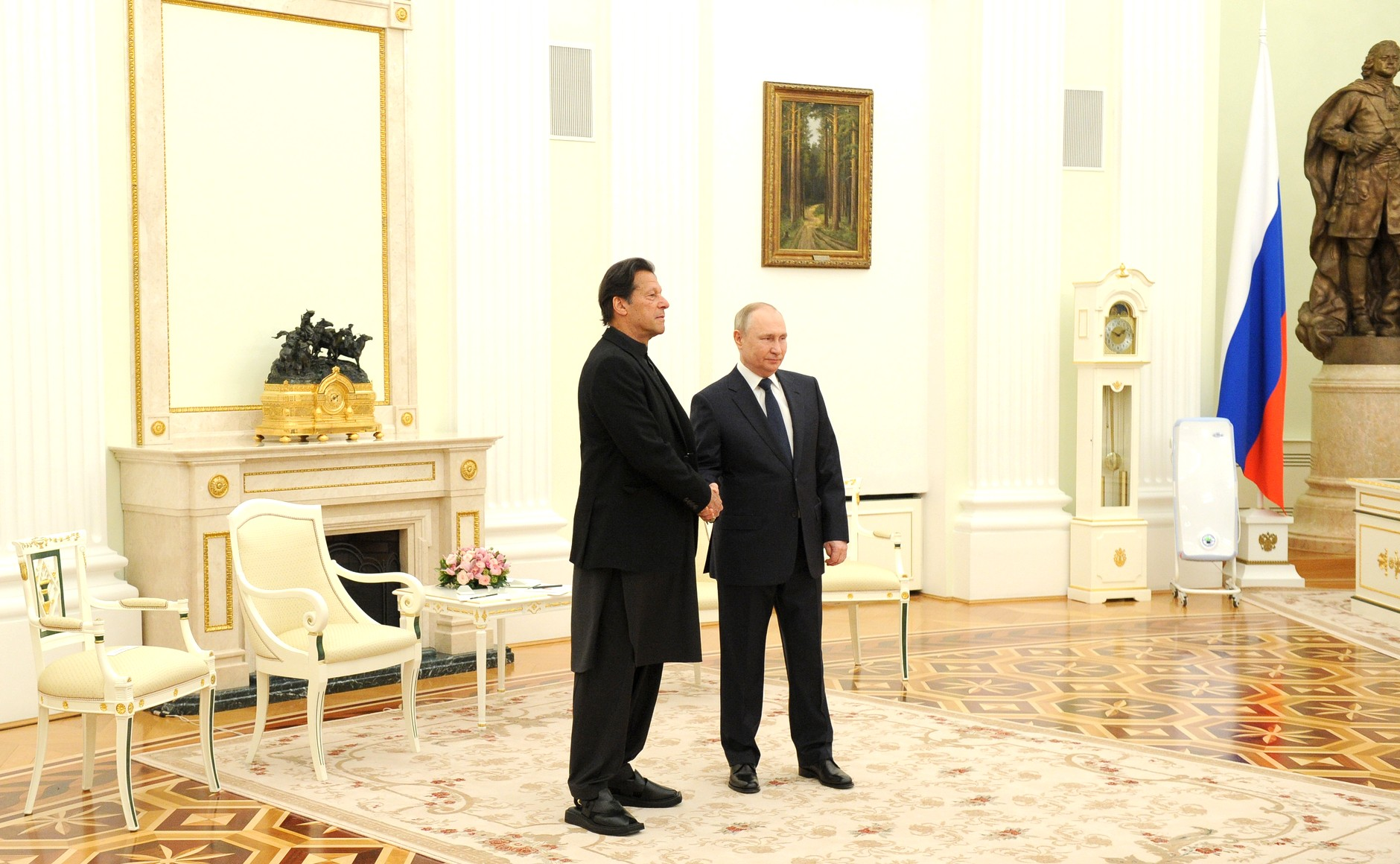
Imran Khan meeting with Vladimir Putin on the day Russia invaded Ukraine during Khan's visit to Russia in February 2022

Khan and his government alleged that the United States government threatened Pakistan with 'consequences' if the vote of no-confidence were to fail and Khan were to remain in office, due to US anger over his visit to Moscow on the day of Putin's invasion of Ukraine, and that 'all would be forgiven' if Khan were removed. After he was removed from office, Khan asked US president Joe Biden, "by indulging in a regime change conspiracy to remove a democratically elected PM of a country of over 220 million people to bring in a puppet PM, do you think you have lessened or increased the anti-American sentiment in Pakistan?" Khan claimed that Nawaz Sharif and Shehbaz Sharif, leaders of the Pakistan Muslim League (N), and Asif Ali Zardari, president of the Pakistan Peoples Party, were also part of the conspiracy.

The US regime change conspiracy claim is disputed by Khan's critics on the grounds that the vote of no confidence was already brewing within Pakistan weeks before the Ukraine invasion and the opposition had formally announced plans to table the no-confidence motion in the Parliament on February 11, about two weeks before Russia's Ukraine invasion and Khan's visit to Russia. Moreover, Khan and his supporters do not offer any proof that the US actually swayed the outcome of the vote of no confidence by persuading some parliamentarians, who would otherwise have supported Khan, to vote for his removal from office. They argue that Imran Khan was brought into power and artificially propped up by the military establishment, and without this help, he never had the legitimate numbers in the parliament to be elected Prime Minister. And that he was legitimately voted out by a majority of National Assembly members once the military decided to withdraw this support and proclaim neutrality.

The basis of Khan's claim was a diplomatic cable sent by Pakistan's ambassador to the US, Asad Majeed Khan, after his meeting with US State Department official Donald Lu in early March. White House Communications Director Kate Bedingfield responded to Khan's allegation of a conspiracy by saying "there is absolutely no truth to that allegation".

The U.S. government had supposedly been frustrated when Khan visited President Vladimir Putin in Moscow on the day of the Russian Invasion of Ukraine. Amid condemnation from European diplomats, Khan responded by saying to a public rally "Are we your slaves that we would do anything you say?" and claiming hypocrisy due to the same criticism not being given to India, who had also refused to condemn Russia's invasion. Deputy Speaker of the National Assembly Qasim Khan Suri from Khan's PTI party, would ultimately use this reason to unilaterally dismiss the motion of no confidence by declaring it to be a foreign conspiracy instead of holding a vote on the motion according to the constitution.

Pakistan's military, while terming the contents of the cable as containing "undiplomatic language", disagreed on whether there had been a foreign conspiracy. The military also publicly maintained that its stance on the political crisis was apolitical. The Pakistani government delivered a diplomatic démarche to the US government protesting against the alleged interference.

Russia supported Khan's claims and slammed the US for the alleged interference in Pakistan's affairs for its "own selfish purposes".

On 23 May 2022, Khan suggested that US State Department official Donald Lu be fired for interfering with Pakistan's domestic politics and "for bad manners and sheer arrogance." Khan added, "I had perfectly good relationship with the Trump administration. It's only when the Biden administration came, and it coincided with what was happening in Afghanistan. And for some reason, which I still don't know, they never got in touch with me."

According to a leaked classified Pakistani cable, at a March 7, 2022 meeting, a U.S. State Department representative stated that Khan's visit to Russia during its invasion of Ukraine "will be forgiven" if the no confidence vote against him was successful; otherwise, it would be "tough going ahead".

While Khan repeatedly mentioned the leaked cable which conveyed the unhappiness of the US over his Russia visit, he did not provide any proof that the US actually influenced the outcome of the vote of no-confidence on the ground. The claim that the Americans orchestrated the no-confidence vote therefore remains strongly contested. Those who dispute this theory maintain that Khan lost power legitimately and constitutionally through the no-confidence vote, which was already in the works weeks before Russia's Ukraine invasion. They argue that the military establishment brought Khan into power by engineering the 2018 election and managing his coalition by telling parliamentarians to vote for him. And that he lost power legitimately when the military finally decided to stop artificially propping up his government weeks before the Ukraine war due to purely internal reasons that had nothing to do with the US.

In February 2023, former Prime Minister Imran Khan said that his removal from office was not directed by the United States, attributing the development instead to former army chief Qamar Javed Bajwa. In an interview to Voice of America, he said “Whatever happened, now as things unfold, it wasn’t the US who told Pakistan [to oust me]. It was unfortunately, from what evidence has come up, [former army chief] Gen [Qamar Javed] Bajwa who somehow managed to tell the Americans that I was anti-American. And so, it [the plan to oust me] wasn’t imported from there. It was exported from here to there.”

== Constitutional crisis following Khan's refusal to allow vote on no-confidence motion ==
According to the Constitution of Pakistan, the Prime Minister has the constitutional power to dissolve the National Assembly and go for fresh elections, but this power is suspended when the Prime Minister is facing a vote of no confidence. The concept behind this provision is that in a parliamentary system, the Prime Minister serves as long as he commands the majority vote of the National Assembly; however, if he loses this majority, the Assembly can elect another Prime Minister and form a new government. Therefore, the right of the Prime Minister to dissolve the National Assembly is suspended until he survives the no-confidence motion and demonstrates that he commands the majority vote of the National Assembly.

On April 3, 2022, Deputy Speaker of the National Assembly Qasim Khan Suri from Khan's PTI party, unilaterally dismissed the motion of no confidence by declaring it to be a foreign conspiracy instead of holding a vote on the motion according to the constitution. He stated, "No foreign country has the right to topple the elected government of Pakistan through a conspiracy" and said that "I am giving a ruling to disallow the (no-confidence) motion."

Within minutes of the above statement by the Deputy speaker, Prime Minister Khan announced on TV that he had advised President Arif Alvi to dissolve assemblies following the dismissal of the no-confidence motion by the Deputy speaker. Hence, on the same day, the president dissolved the National Assembly on the prime minister's advice under Article 58 of the Constitution.

On the same day, the Supreme Court of Pakistan (SCP) took a suo moto of the ongoing situation and a three-member bench of the supreme court heard the case. On 7 April 2022, the dismissal of the no-confidence motion without a vote and the subsequent dissolution of the National Assembly was ruled unconstitutional by the supreme court.

The SCP ordered that the National Assembly session be reconvened at no later than 10:30 a.m. on 9 April and may not be prorogued until the no-confidence vote is held.

Afterwards, Khan said he accepted the court's decision but urged people to come out and protest against what he called an "imported government".

== National Assembly proceedings ==
- 25 March 2022: The session of parliament started and after prayer for deceased parliamentarians, National Assembly Speaker Asad Qaisar immediately adjourned the session till 28 March 2022 in accordance with parliamentary convention.
- 28 March 2022: After 161 lawmakers had voted in favour of tabling of the resolution, Leader of the Opposition Shehbaz Sharif tabled the no-confidence motion against Khan. Subsequently, the deputy speaker adjourned the session until 4:00 pm on 31 March.
- 31 March 2022: The National Assembly session to debate the no-confidence motion against Khan was adjourned till 11:30 am on 3 April 2022, minutes after it began.
- 3 April 2022: National Assembly Deputy Speaker Qasim Khan Suri dismissed the no-confidence motion against Imran Khan, stating that it was against Article 5 of the Constitution which pledges "loyalty to the State". Suri cited "foreign interference" in his ruling to dismiss the motion.
- 9 April 2022: A meeting of the National Assembly was called and held around 12:00 pm. During the day, the session was adjourned thrice amid filibustering by members of the treasury benches. Thus, the no-confidence motion was not immediately put to vote in the National Assembly. Minutes before midnight, Speaker Asad Qaiser resigned from his position. Moments before midnight, Ayaz Sadiq laid out the no-confidence motion in the National Assembly. At midnight, the National Assembly was adjourned to meet on 12:02 AM on 10 April 2022.
- 10 April 2022: The no-confidence motion passes with 174 votes, a majority in the National Assembly, which resulted in Imran Khan losing the confidence of the house and ceasing to hold office of prime minister.

== Aftermath ==
=== Election of a new Prime Minister ===
On 11 April 2022, the National Assembly held an election to decide the new prime minister. The outgoing ruling party PTI initially nominated former Foreign Minister Shah Mehmood Qureshi for the position. Shehbaz Sharif, former Chief Minister of Punjab and brother of former Prime Minister Nawaz Sharif, was elected unopposed.

←2018	11 April 2022	2024→
Candidate	Party	Votes Obtained
Required majority →		172 out of 342
Shehbaz Sharif	Pakistan Muslim League (N)	174
Shah Mehmood Qureshi	Pakistan Tehreek-e-Insaf	0
Abstentions		165

=== Public reaction ===
Imran Khan called for a mass rally. Protests were held in several cities in Pakistan upon PTI's call, where attendees allegedly numbered up to the ten thousands in some areas. Overseas Pakistanis also reportedly took part in demonstrations outside of Pakistan.

A "smear campaign" against the Pakistan Army was "taken notice" of on 12 April 2022 during the 79th Formation Commanders Conference, which was held at GHQ Rawalpindi under the chairmanship of Army Chief General Qamar Javed Bajwa. In the conference, formation commanders expressed confidence in the decisions of the military leadership for upholding the constitution and law and reportedly took "stern notice of the propaganda campaign" against the Pakistan Army in the wake of Khan's ouster following the no-confidence motion. The Federal Investigation Agency (FIA) arrested eight people allegedly involved in a well-organized campaign on social media against the Pakistan Army, the FIA also raided the house of Dr Arsalan Khalid, former focal person to PM Imran Khan on digital media By May 26, protests had escalated significantly, with the interior ministry authorizing the deployment of the army in the Red Zone.

On 9 April 2022, BBC Urdu reported that Imran Khan had allegedly decided to sack the army chief, Qamar Javed Bajwa, which led to his government's ouster. In response, the ISPR said: "The news published in BBC Urdu is totally baseless and full of lies." It added: "This general propaganda news does not mention any credible, authoritative and relevant sources and is a violation of basic journalistic ethics. And there is no truth in this fake news and it clearly appears to be part of a systematic misinformation campaign." The ISPR stated the matter was being taken up with BBC officials.

== Admission of a Pakistan Democratic Movement (PDM) Leader ==
Following the 2024 Pakistani general election and the dissolution of the Pakistan Democratic Movement (PDM), the opposition coalition which removed Imran Khan through the no-confidence motion, its leader Maulana Fazlur Rehman claimed that army chief Qamar Javed Bajwa had guided all political parties regarding the no-confidence vote against former prime minister Imran Khan.

== Khan's demand that the military intervene to remove PDM government for early elections ==
In the months after his removal from office, Imran Khan repeatedly demanded that the military should intervene to hold early elections instead of allowing the PDM government elected by the National Assembly after the no-confidence vote against him, to complete its constitutional term. For example, on December 11, 2022, he repeated this demand and said, “I have expectations from the new (army) set-up that the national security institutions will take into account this serious situation of the country’s economy on a downward spiral.” According to Dawn, when asked "if it was constitutionally wise to invite state institutions to intervene," Khan responded by questioning whether actions taken by the incumbent government were themselves constitutional.

== The debate on the legitimacy of the vote of no confidence ==
The claims by the two sides in the debate on the vote of no confidence that removed Imran Khan from office can be summarized as follows.

Khan and his supporters claim that he was a genuinely elected Prime Minister who had fairly won the largest number of seats in the 2018 elections, and formed a legitimate coalition to obtain the required majority of votes in the National Assembly to become Prime Minister. They say that the vote of no confidence was orchestrated by the military as a coup against their legitimately elected government, with backing from the US.

Khan's critics claim that he was engineered into power by the military establishment by first manipulating the 2018 election in his favor, and then putting together his ruling coalition for him. According to them, the military establishment continued to help manage his coalition and prevented it from breaking apart with the ISI telling enough politicians, who would not otherwise be supporting him, to stick with Khan. But eventually, he and the Generals who brought him into power, developed differences and fell out with each other. The military establishment then proclaimed neutrality and stopped artificially propping up his government, which fell as he did not have the numbers to stay in office on his own. They argue that his removal through a vote of no-confidence was a constitutional ouster of a government that was never legitimate to start with. And that it returned power to those who had the legitimate majority and the right to form a government, which had been taken from them by the military establishment to put Imran Khan in power.

Given the divergence of views over Imran Khan's ouster, the no-confidence vote against him remains a contested and polarizing issue in Pakistani politics.
