= Allegations of rigging in the 2024 Pakistani general election =

Controversy in Pakistani politics

The 2024 Pakistani general election was marred by allegations of vote rigging and delayed results. These allegations led to widespread protests and unrest across the country. The Military Establishment was accused of rigging in favour of the Pakistan Muslim League (N) (PML-N)'s leader and founder former Prime Minister of Pakistan Nawaz Sharif to keep the Pakistan Tehreek-e-Insaf (PTI)'s leader and founder former Prime Minister of Pakistan Imran Khan out of the electoral race. Foreign media, observer groups and members of the international community, including the United States, United Kingdom and the European Union, have voiced their concerns about the fairness of the elections.

Media outlets around the world denounced the election as "fraudulent" with western media characterizing the election as already decided in favor of the military's preferred candidate Nawaz Sharif.

Vote rigging and irregularities were allegedly to have occurred through the Election Commission of Pakistan's Form 45s and Form 47s. Many activists and politicians including former Pakistani Prime Ministers Shahid Khaqan Abbasi and Imran Khan have alleged that Form 45s carry the actual results while Form 47s were prepared before Form 45s.

== Background ==
The election results gave former prime minister Imran Khan's Pakistan Tehreek-e-Insaf (PTI) party a surprising first place, despite its candidates being forced to run as independents after the party was barred from directly competing in the election. However, with no party winning a clear majority, the country remained in turmoil as several parties claimed they would form the government.

Prior to the election, concerns grew over electoral irregularities as evidence suggested manipulation and political interference by the Establishment – a local euphemism for the Pakistan Army. Many observers had raised concerns about potential rigging in the elections. Human rights organizations, such as Amnesty International, voiced worries about the possibility of an internet shutdown on election day.

== Allegations ==
According to Pakistani election laws, the returning officer (RO) shall compile provisional results on or before 2 a.m. the day immediately following the election day. However, for thousands of polling stations across Pakistan, results were halted, and they were not reported even 24 hours after polling ended. The results in several key constituencies were shifted towards the military-backed parties after hours of unexplained delays.

On election night, initial reports from television broadcasts indicated that PTI-backed candidates were leading in a significant number of National Assembly seats, with approximately 127 seats under their favor according to official counts. Other unofficial initial results showed Independents leading in 61 constituencies including those backed by the PTI, the PML-N leading in 43, and the PPP leading in 47. Others led in 27 seats. The Election Commission of Pakistan (ECP) issued a statement clarifying that media reports on election results sourced from the Commission sources were inaccurate, emphasizing that no official results had been released. However, the announcement of results was then unexpectedly halted, which raised concerns. PTI officials claimed that the party was leading in at least 125 National Assembly seats and that the official results were being tampered with, with cumulative polling stations' results of their candidates not tallying with the provisional final counts being issued by result officers. Several PTI-backed candidates from three of Pakistan's four provinces, as well as Islamabad, challenged these allegedly doctored final counts in the courts.

Rehana Imtiaz Dar, the mother of Usman Dar, who was contesting for the National Assembly seat from NA-71 Sialkot-II constituency against Khawaja Asif of PML-N, stunned the country when in initially results, she defeated Asif with 131,615 to 82,615 votes. However, when the full official results were announced, Dar's total had been reduced by 31,434 votes, while Asif gained votes, ultimately leading to his declaration as the winner. Similarly, in the NA-128 Lahore-XII constituency, the PTI-backed candidate Salman Akram Raja was initially leading with 100,000 votes in 1,310 out of 1,320 polling stations on election night. However, the next day, he was trailing by 13,522 votes, and his opponent Aun Chaudhry was declared the winner instead.

Despite assurances that official results would be released early on 9 February, the ECP only started releasing results more than 15 hours after polls closed, at noon on that day, citing complications brought about by the internet outage on election day. The ECP had earlier assured that their system will not be affected by any kind of internet outage, and can work offline. The Ministry of Interior cited communication challenges for the delay in election result compilation, attributing it to security precautions. These measures, aimed at ensuring the safety of personnel and ballots, led to the extended processing time. However, the Ministry assured that the situation was now under control and expected the results to follow suit. Despite the restoration of mobile signals in the early hours of 9 February, the results still faced delays. The declaration of provisional results was not done until the late hours of 10 February, more than two days after the vote count had started. PTI supporters suspected that the shutdown of the mobile network was an attempt to disrupt the party's efforts to rally voters and document electoral fraud. The Economist called the delay in announcing the election results unusual, even by Pakistan's standards, saying that signs of tampering were "plentiful." Reportedly, when the internet returned early on 9 February, PTI-backed independent candidates across the country seemed to have a clear majority in National Assembly with 127 seats. The party pointed out significant disparities between polling station and constituency-level results, as the former did not reconcile with the latter and asserted that it could have won more seats if authorities had not interfered. Additionally, there were abrupt halts in result reporting on election night, and some candidates lost big leads overnight.

Salman Akram Raja, a PTI leader and candidate was quoted in The Guardian saying that he had pursued legal action, referring to the military's involvement by accusing them of rewriting the results. The PTI claimed that the results of at least 18 National Assembly seats were "falsely changed" by election officers, while at least six of its losing affiliated candidates launched legal appeals questioning the results, including Yasmin Rashid, who lost to Nawaz Sharif in a Lahore constituency. Jan Muhammad Buledi, a former spokesperson of the Balochistan provincial government and secretary general of the National Party was quoted in The Guardian as saying that he received a direct death threat from an army colonel after he publicly accused the military of stuffing the ballot boxes with fake votes in the constituency where he was a candidate.

During a press briefing on 13 February, PTI chair Gohar Ali Khan claimed that party had won 180 National Assembly seats, including three in Islamabad, four in Balochistan, 115 in Punjab, 16 in Sindh, and 42 in Khyber Pakhtunkhwa. He also called for the immediate resignation of Sikandar Sultan Raja, the head of the ECP. PTI leader Hammad Azhar asserted that, based on the Form 45 issued by the ECP, the PML-N secured only 17 National Assembly seats and approximately 30-40 seats in the Punjab Assembly. The party also established an online portal to gather evidence of electoral irregularities by collecting election records from polling stations nationwide, aiming to highlight disparities between recorded votes in Form 45 and the provisional official election results in Form 47. Meanwhile, PTI-backed independent candidates from Karachi filed petitions with the Sindh High Court, contesting the provisional results for 16 National Assembly seats and over 20 Sindh Assembly seats that they alleged to have won in the city. They argued that Form 45 data showed them leading by large margins, but the Form-47 results declared candidates from Muttahida Qaumi Movement – Pakistan and the PPP as winners, alleging tampering by returning officers. The courts saw a surge in legal challenges, with candidates - notably a vast majority of them PTI-backed independents - contesting the provisional results in their respective constituencies. However the court dismissed approximately 50 of these petitions and directed the ECP to rectify any discrepancies in Forms 45 and 47.

Nawaz Sharif ran for the seat in NA-130 Lahore-XIV against jailed PTI senior leader Yasmin Rashid. According to the Election Commission of Pakistan, Sharif won the seat with 179,310 votes, while Rashid received 104,485 votes. However, Rashid's legal counsel, Ahmed Owais, alleged that the election had been rigged in Sharif's favor, claiming that 74,000 extra votes were cast to secure his victory. Rashid challenged the result in the Election Commission of Pakistan and the Lahore High Court. The civil society organization PATTAN also raised concerns about the election process, stating that NA-130 was predicted to experience significant rigging, and later claimed that the election had been manipulated with ‘historic rigging’ using pre-prepared Form 47s to favor Sharif. However, no official verdict has confirmed these allegations.

On 13 February, Hafiz Naeem ur Rehman, who won election to the Sindh Assembly representing the PS-129 Karachi Central-VIII constituency on behalf of the Jamaat-e-Islami (JI) party relinquished his seat, saying that it was a PTI affiliate who had won and calling his position a "charity seat".

The leader of the Grand Democratic Alliance, the Pir of Pagaro VIII relinquished the two Sindh Assembly seats won by his party, citing electoral fraud. While addressing a protest sit-in against alleged election rigging, he predicted that the coalition government would collapse within 10 months. He also defended Khan against corruption allegations, stating, "If he is a thief, then we all are thieves."

During a news conference on 16 February, PML-N leaders Ataullah Tarar and Maryam Aurangzeb contended that the PTI had fabricated counterfeit Form-45s, which they claim were being circulated on social media as screenshots. The PTI, they claimed, refused to provide these forms to the ECP, citing their alleged fraudulent nature. According to a report, as of 24 February, out of the 90 National Assembly seats where the PTI claimed their candidates had won but were allegedly prevented due to rigging, only 35 independent candidates have filed cases for vote rechecking and other procedures before the ECP. However, the remaining 55 PTI-backed independents, who believe they lost due to unfair elections, have not filed cases before the ECP.

On 17 February, more than a week after the election, Rawalpindi Division commissioner Liaquat Ali Chattha resigned from his post after admitting his role in electoral fraud in the locality where 11 out of a total of 13 national assembly seats were won by PML-N candidates. He claimed his office helped candidates, who were trailing in the actual vote counts by approximately 70,000 votes per candidate, to secure victory using fake stamps. He implicated Chief Electoral Commissioner Sikandar Sultan Raja and Chief Justice Qazi Faez Isa in the scheme. The ECP denied the allegations, saying that divisional commissioners had no direct role in the electoral process, and said it would launch an inquiry. Isa rejected the commissioner's allegation, calling them "baseless". The PTI also called for an investigation. Following his announcement, Chattha surrendered to police, who sealed off his office as part of an investigation. In addition to the PTI, a PML-N senator also demanded the resignation of Sikandar Sultan Raja over the rigging allegations.

Following Chattha's statement, X (formerly Twitter) was subsequently blocked in Pakistan, without explanation. President Alvi commented that the blocking of social media websites in Pakistan reflected a lack of intellectual capacity to manage criticism. However, on 22 February, Chattha retracted his claims of election rigging and issued an apology to the ECP, saying that the PTI offered a strong position for making the allegations. He also said that his mention of the Chief Justice of Pakistan was “taken to create mistrust in general public” against Qazi Faiz Isa.

While authorities insist that a division commissioner has no role in the election process in Pakistan, there are concerns about their potential unofficial influence on election conduct, as during these elections electoral officers were appointed from within the ranks of deputy commissioners and assistant commissioners, who both fall below a commissioner in the country's bureaucratic hierarchy.

Political analyst Zahid Hussain commented that the commissioner's confession indicates widespread electoral rigging during the general elections, and remarked that the high-ranking bureaucrat's public confession had worsened the country's crisis. Following Chattha's retraction of electoral fraud claims and disappearance, Dawn in its editorial wrote that this turn of events had left the public puzzled and deepened the mystery, prompting urgent calls for an immediate investigation.

The Free and Fair Election Network (FAFEN) said that its election agents were denied access to observe result tabulations in approximately half of the electoral constituencies. Additionally, in dozens of other constituencies, candidates and their election agents were also barred from observing the vote tallies. FAFEN called on the ECP to thoroughly examine the contested constituencies' results using data analytics and forensics to ensure the legitimacy of election results, as requested by political parties and candidates through legal channels.

On 6 March, the Pakistan Institute of Legislative Development and Transparency (PILDAT) published its evaluation, conducted independently, of the election. The assessment highlighted a worrisome decrease in fairness ratings compared to prior election cycles. PILDAT recommended that the ECP carry out a comprehensive and unbiased investigation into various election-related issues.

On 4 May, during a tense confrontation between former Caretaker Prime Minister of Pakistan Anwaar ul Haq Kakar and PML-N leader Hanif Abbasi. Kakar issued a veiled warning, suggesting that if he were to disclose information about Form-47, the PML-N would find themselves in a difficult position. This exchange implied potential tampering in Form-47 during the election. However, Kakar later stated that his remarks were misrepresented by the media; he merely corrected Abbasi about the wheat scandal, implying that he never mentioned Form-47. Subsequently, PTI also demanded for an independent inquiry into the spat between Kakar and Abbasi and asserted that this verbal altercation has brought to light alleged election rigging.

== Allegation by military officials ==
In April 2024, Lieutenant General Ayman Bilal Safdar, the Commander of Mangla Corps, was made to resign after he accused the Army for election rigging during a Corps Commander Conference held on March 5, 2024. According to reports, he was previously considered a candidate for the position of COAS after the retirement of Asim Munir. His resignation came after he urged COAS Asim Munir not to let personal differences with Imran Khan affect the Army.

== Disinformation ==
Rumors spread on social media claiming that international media outlets had reported the PTI winning over 150 seats. However, a fact-check conducted by iVerify found no evidence to support these claims.

The official Twitter account of Imran Khan was involved in disseminating false information by sharing a fabricated video purportedly showing post-election rigging.

== International analysis ==
The New York Times wrote the election results had caught many off guard, as the PML-N was widely anticipated to secure a landslide victory with the backing of the military. The report noted that voters expressed frustration with the military's interference in politics and opted to vote for PTI candidates in defiance of the military generals. It went on to say the election results had humiliated the military establishment and started a new political crisis in the country. Another article by the same newspaper said that the growing public discontent with military interference in politics is likely to pressure Pakistan's army chief General Asim Munir, with his only options being to reconcile with Imran Khan or push forward with an anti-Khan coalition, which many analysts believe would be weak and unsustainable.

The Washington Post in its editorial board wrote following the election outcome, the military's control is being questioned more than ever before, possibly in decades as for the first time, the military-preferred candidate, Nawaz Sharif, was unable to win the most seats. In a separate piece, it wrote that the youth of Pakistan caused the most significant election upset in the country's recent history saying that the youth is increasingly discontented with economic uncertainty and blame corruption and political dynasties. This dissatisfaction is now being expressed more openly on social media, potentially straining the relationship between civilian leaders and the military which will have long-lasting effects. It also wrote that the election results were a humiliation for Sharif, despite being seen as the favoured candidate of the Pakistani military, which had held significant influence in determining the prime minister.

France 24 called the election "The ‘generals’ elections’ which turned against the military". It also dubbed the election as the “most rigged” in the country's history saying the military was seen as backing Nawaz Sharif. According to TIME, the Pakistani military did everything to "sideline Imran Khan—and failed," but said that the military was continuing to try and prevent the PTI from returning to power calling the election result as an embarrassment for Sharif.

Ryan Grim in an article published by The Intercept said that the historic turnout in Pakistan was swamping the military's effort to rig the election and that the military has proved unable to suppress the populist movement interrogating its authority. The Economist called the election "botched", but wrote that the military favours the "shabby" result, fearing that it would lose its economic benefits shout it give up power. It also suggested that the despite their efforts, the military leadership did not seem to have as much control as they believed to prevent Khan from winning. It also said the election outcome was a strong message to the military and could potentially mark a shift in its influence over Pakistani politics, while adding that a prolonged period of political instability could occur in the short-term. It called the electoral process "dubious" which was preceded by a coordinated campaign by the military against Imran Khan.

The Guardian noted that suspicions of military rigging arose during election day due to a nationwide mobile phone blackout and the slow counting of results, leading to concerns that the military was exerting influence to secure the PML-N's success. It added that the military's attempts to influence the election appeared to have been thwarted, particularly due to the PTI's effective utilization of social media, given the significant levels of illiteracy in the country. In a separate article, The Guardian noted analysts' views that the election results and potential weak coalition government align with the military's interests, protecting their political and business agendas.

The Financial Times in its editorial called the election results "flawed" and "shocking", at the same time describing it as a rejection of military influence. Pakistani columnist Khurram Husain was quoted in a separate piece in the newspaper as saying that Pakistan will experience not only the influence of the military but also a collaborative endeavour involving the judiciary and major political parties to thwart the PTI from assuming power.

The New York Post, referencing the New York Times article, stated that this election marks the initial instance in Pakistan's history where a party has achieved such success without the support of the military and this will spark a new political chaos in the country. According to the Canadian Broadcasting Corporation the election results did not unfold as per the military's expectations and had shaken the elite. Hasan Askari Rizvi was quoted as saying, "This is a negative vote for the policies that the military was pursuing.".

Sameer Arshad Khatlani in an opinion piece for the Dhaka Tribune wrote "Election results seem to be blowing up in the military establishment’s face which attempted to make Imran Khan irrelevant by jailing him, cracking down PTI". Lipika Pelham wrote for the BBC saying despite PTI-backed independents winning the majority of seats in parliament, they were unlikely to be permitted to form a government.

During an interview with The Wire, Najam Sethi remarked that Imran Khan and the PTI had strongly resisted the influence of the military, which led to the latter resorting to last-minute rigging efforts. Firstpost wrote that the Pakistani military had experienced a setback, at least temporarily, with public sentiment turning against it. It also noted that allegations of electoral fraud by the military put Western countries in a difficult position, given their historic support of the military to ensure the security of the country's nuclear arsenal. It added that "General Asim Munir's tenure may be remembered as one of the darkest for the army, with its reputation suffering greatly under his leadership." It also raised concern over Munir's post-election speech, describing it as uncommon. The Times of India also described Munir as the primary loser of the election. The Indian Express wrote that the unexpected success of the PTI forced the military to manipulate results to avoid an unfavourable outcome. Consequently, there were delays in announcing results, and internet and mobile services were suspended in numerous regions. Meanwhile, Pakistani social media platforms were flooded with videos depicting alleged rigging and manipulation. The Deccan Herald wrote that although the election results represented a significant setback for the military, and would potentially undermine General Munir's position, but it was unlikely that the military will relinquish its influential role in determining the next prime minister.

According to Al Jazeera, numerous analysts suggest that Sharif's return to electoral politics was made possible due to the military's decision to support him in the election. However, despite this tacit support from the military, Sharif failed to win.

Foreign Policy wrote that one clear thing is the old methods used to silence people's voices are no longer effective. A new generation of young voters has emerged in Pakistan who are calling for a departure from the past and seeking the ability to elect their leaders, rather than allowing the military, which has historically dominated politics to maintain control over the country. In a separate piece, it wrote that one key factor in the PTI's success in the election was their refusal to let the military control the election's outcome, despite their efforts to ensure the PTI's defeat, and that the PTI's challenge to break the military's grip on politics, has sparked some hope for the future of Pakistan's democracy and wrote that accusations of military's vote manipulation will further fuel anti-establishment feelings in the country.

In a piece for the BBC, Mohammed Hanif highlighted that in Pakistan, the desire for the prime ministerial role is rare due to the establishment's belief that elections are too sensitive to be entrusted solely to civilian politicians. Consequently, following the elections, leading politicians displayed reluctance to claim power. Hanif observed a lack of enthusiasm among PTI's opponents to form a government in the two weeks following the election. Additionally, Hanif pointed out that supporters of Imran Khan campaigned in a guerrilla-style manner, and surprised many on election day. He also remarked on the adventurous nature of Pakistani politics, noting that while many politicians have faced imprisonment, none seemed to enjoy it as much as Imran Khan.

== Post-election political moves ==
At a press conference on 13 February, the PPP's Asif Ali Zardari and the PML-N's Shehbaz Sharif announced that their parties had agreed to form a coalition government. PML-N spokesperson Marriyum Aurangzeb said that Shehbaz was the prime ministerial nominee following his elder brother Nawaz's recommendation. PPP leader Bilawal Bhutto Zardari said that he would endorse a PML-N nominee for prime minister and that the PPP would not join the next cabinet. He also expressed a desire to see his father Asif Ali Zardari return as president, and said that his party would field nominees for the chairmanship of the Pakistani Senate and the speakership of the National Assembly. The Muttahida Qaumi Movement – Pakistan, the Pakistan Muslim League (Q), the Istehkam-e-Pakistan Party and the Balochistan Awami Party also expressed their intent to join the PLM-N and PPP coalition, which enables them to hold a total of 152 directly elected seats in the National Assembly, which is expected to be augmented by gains in reserved seats.

In response, Imran Khan called the upcoming coalition a "daylight robbery" and warned "against the misadventure of forming a government with stolen votes." Akhtar Mengal, the president of the Balochistan National Party (Mengal), said that the PML-N and PPP-led coalition would collapse within one and a half years due to the parties "blackmailing" each other, citing previous coalition governments. Observers noted that the increased support for the PTI had changed the power dynamics, making a Sharif-led government seem weak even before it began. A PML-N leader, speaking anonymously, acknowledged that the party might not complete its full five-year term if it forms a government and stated that the party's entire election campaign centred around Nawaz Sharif becoming the prime minister, which resulted in feelings of betrayal and disappointment among supporters when Nawaz chose to nominate Shehbaz for the position instead.

On 16 February, senior PTI official Asad Qaiser said that Imran Khan had nominated Omar Ayub Khan, a grandson of former military ruler Ayub Khan, as the PTI's nominee for prime minister, despite him being in hiding over charges relating to the May 9 riots. The PTI also nominated Mian Aslam Iqbal and Ali Amin Gandapur as its respective nominees for chief minister in Punjab and Khyber Pakhtunkhwa. Later that day however, PTI official Muhammad Ali Saif stated that the party had chosen to be in the opposition both at the federal level and in Punjab, following the directives of Imran Khan.

On 19 February, the PTI announced that it would form an alliance with the Sunni Ittehad Council (SIC) solely to secure its portion of reserved seats in the National, Punjab, and Khyber Pakhtunkhwa assemblies. Following the announcement, nearly all PTI-backed independent candidates in national and provincial assemblies submitted affidavits to the ECP, officially joining the SIC and approached the ECP to claim their reserved seats. However, the PPP, the PML-N, and the MQM-P opposed and challenged the allocation of reserved seats to the PTI/SIC bloc, arguing that this bloc does not qualify as a "parliamentary party". PTI chair Gohar Ali also emphasized that an NA session could not be called without first notifying the reserved seats for the PTI-backed SIC bloc. President Arif Alvi also declined to convene the NA inaugural session, which is typically summoned within 21 days of the general elections as per the constitution. He was also of the view that Assembly was not complete and therefore the ECP should distribute the reserved seats for women and minorities to the PTI-backed SIC bloc. As a result, he faced significant criticism from the PPP and the PML-N who asserted that the President's action amounts to "abrogating the Constitution" by not convening the NA session, and warned of potential legal consequences. Imran Khan also endorsed President Alvi's decision to decline the summoning of the NA session. On 28 February, the National Assembly Secretariat scheduled the inaugural session for 29 February at 10 a.m., bypassing the need for notification from Alvi.

== Reactions ==
On 28 February, Imran Khan penned a letter to the International Monetary Fund, urging for an audit of the elections to ensure political stability in the country before engaging in discussions for a new bailout package with the incoming PML-N/PPP coalition government. This action was heavily criticized by the PML-N and the PPP, who argued that it would be tantamount to inviting foreign intervention in the country's domestic affairs. Caretaker Prime Minister Anwaar ul Haq Kakar also criticized Khan's letter to the IMF, described it as "unjustified" and "highly irresponsible", and stated that it would have political repercussions for the PTI. Nawaz Sharif likened this action to hostility against the state. The PTI clarified that they did not oppose any financial assistance to Pakistan from global lenders but urged the IMF to consider its policy guidance note from 1997 stating that "a government without legitimate representation, when imposed upon a country, carries no moral authority to govern, and, in particular, to carry out taxation measures".

On 28 February, at least 31 members of the US Congress wrote a letter to US President Joe Biden, urging him to withhold recognition of the incoming coalition government until a "thorough, transparent, and credible" audit of the election is conducted.

President Arif Alvi, stated that the use of electronic voting machines (EVMs) could have averted the uncertainty surrounding the election results and reminded of his efforts to introduce them in the country's electoral process. In a message from jail, Imran Khan claimed that the PTI won 170 seats, achieving a two-thirds majority in the 2024 elections. He emphasized the power of the electorate and called for the protection of their votes. According to Khan's sister, Aleema Khan, he described the rigging as the "Mother of all rigging" and ridiculed the PML-N, saying “Instead of honouring the vote, the ‘selected ones’ have honoured the boot,” implying that the PML-N prioritized military influence over respecting the electoral process.

== Twitter ban ==
X (formerly Twitter) was suspended following the allegations of electoral irregularities by Chattha. The Pakistan Telecommunication Authority (PTA) reportedly forwarded more than 67,000 links to Twitter for blocking, but the platform only processed some of them. Despite the Sindh High Court's directive to restore access to the social media platform, X remains inaccessible to users across Pakistan.

Activists challenging the ban allege that it was designed to suppress dissent following the February 8 general elections, which were allegedly marred by widespread claims of vote rigging and subsequent protests. Authorities had also allegedly shut down mobile services on the day of the elections, again citing security concerns. NetBlocks, an internet monitoring group, reported that users were unable to access X on 10 February while the country was awaiting the election results.

Following the elections, access to X has been sporadic, with availability fluctuating based on the internet service provider, forcing users to rely on virtual private networks (VPNs), as noted by Alp Toker of NetBlocks.

Imran Khan’s Pakistan Tehreek-e-Insaf (PTI) party, a prolific user of social media platforms, has been particularly impacted by this ban. This reliance on social media grew especially after the country’s traditional media began censoring news about Khan and his party in the run-up to the elections. Khan, who has more than 20 million followers on X, saw his party call for protests against alleged rigging in the February 2024 General Elections. A government official’s admission of vote manipulation in mid-February raised further concerns about the transparency of the elections confirming Imran Khan’s claims to many and furthering the allegations.

NetBlocks, the internet Observatory confirmed through its Live metrics showing X/Twitter has been restricted in #Pakistan for since February, with service remaining fully or intermittently restricted for most users. They added that the incident comes amidst a surge in internet censorship during elections marred by irregularities in Pakistan. Asad Baig, a media strategist at Dawn News said that “The government’s actions reek of authoritarianism, stifling dissent, and silencing voices in the name of maintaining control.”

Several condemnations of the ban were also exchanged by many non-governmental organizations.

In March, the Interior Ministry informed the Sindh High Court (SHC) that X had been temporarily suspended pending further orders based on intelligence agency reports. On 18 April, a statement from X's Global Government Affairs indicated that "it continues to work with the government to understand their concerns".

== MQM-P’s leaked audios ==
After the elections, a series of leaked audio clips of key leaders of the Muttahida Qaumi Movement Pakistan (MQM-P) surfaced on social media, sparking controversy and speculation regarding internal party negotiations and alleged rigging. On 27 February, a leaked video surfaced showing MQM-P leader Syed Mustafa Kamal saying during a party meeting that PML-N leaders informed him about the PPP's claim that the "MQM-P’s mandate is 100% fake". Additionally, he stated that the PPP suggested to the PML-N that the PPP and the PML-N collectively possess sufficient numbers to form the federal government, rendering the MQM-P unnecessary for government formation. Kamal later confirmed the authenticity of the video and insisted that there was nothing new in his party rivals' claim that his mandate was fake. Later that day, Sindh Governor and MQM-P leader Kamran Tessori also acknowledged in another leaked audio recording that the MQM-P "did not get votes in this election," and emphasized the difference from the 2018 general election when the party obtained seven seats, which was their actual vote bank.

== Protests ==
After the elections, allegations of vote rigging led to mass protests across Pakistan on 10 February 2024. Dissatisfied with the delayed results, PTI supporters staged protests in various cities including in Karachi and Lahore. The party claimed that the actual number of seats it won was more than 150 and alleged systematic rigging in the counting and recording of votes. Approximately 2,000 PTI supporters demonstrated in Peshawar, while in Karachi, PTI activists joined forces with Tehreek-e-Labbaik Pakistan (TLP) and Jamaat-e-Islami Pakistan (JI) members in a collective sit-in outside the ECP Sindh office in Karachi. Concurrently, protests unfolded outside the offices of returning officers (ROs) in Islamabad. PTI demonstrators in Peshawar persisted with their sit-in on Charsadda Road for a second day, contesting alleged rigging in the constituency PK-82 Peshawar-XIV. Meanwhile, in Gujrat, Punjab police detained 100 PTI activists for blocking the Grand Trunk Road. Protests by PTI-backed candidates and their supporters also occurred outside the RO office in Chakwal. Throughout these demonstrations, protesters encountered tear gas, baton charges, and reported instances of police brutality, including alleged beatings and arrests.

The following day, PTI protests continued across various cities. In Peshawar, PTI workers obstructed the M-1 motorway, while protests continued in multiple Punjab cities, including Lahore, where police detained numerous PTI supporters at the protest sites. PTI leaders also alleged that in Rahim Yar Khan, police conducted raids on the residences of seven PTI-backed independent candidates who had won seats in the election, purportedly to pressure them to join the PML-N. In Karachi, protests extended into a second consecutive day, with JI staged sit-ins across different parts of Karachi, while PTI once again organized a demonstration outside the ECP Sindh office. Additionally, the JUI-F blocked the N-25 National Highway and also staged sit-ins on several roads including Vadhavah Bypass, the Indus Highway and N-5 National Highway in Matiari.

On 13 February, Hafiz Naeem ur Rehman, who was elected to the Provincial Assembly of Sindh from the PS-129 Karachi Central-VIII constituency as a candidate of the JI relinquished his seat, saying that it was a PTI-backed candidate who had won and calling his position a "charity seat". Reportedly, Rehman was declared the winner, in the constituency PS-129 Karachi Central-VIII. in an attempt to alleviate the pressure caused by JI's resistance and protests.

The JUI-F announced to initiate a protest campaign starting from 16 February and also declared their intention to sit in opposition benches in assemblies. While PTI also announced plans to commence nationwide demonstrations against alleged election rigging from February 17.

On February 18, PTI workers clashed with police in multiple cities across the country during protests. In Lahore, PTI supporters assembled outside the Lahore Press Club and the PTI's Jail Road office to voice their grievances. On the same day, PTI-backed candidates, including Salman Akram Raja, were arrested by Punjab Police. Police preemptively arrived at protest sites in other Punjab cities and apprehended several party leaders, candidates, workers, and supporters. Meanwhile, in Karachi, hundreds of PTI workers and supporters gathered outside the ECP's Sindh office, while newly elected lawmakers, including Ali Amin Gandapur, staged rallies in Peshawar and other areas of Khyber Pakhtunkhwa.

On 23 February, the first session of Punjab Assembly was called. Amidst heavy police presence led by the Usman Anwar, Inspector General of the Punjab Police, PTI-backed winning candidates made various attempts to enter the Punjab Assembly premises to protest against the alleged rigging. Even PTI nominee for the Punjab Chief ministership, Mian Aslam Iqbal, who was slated to lead the protest, was apprehended by police and unable to reach the assembly. The same day, PTI, GDA, JI, JUI-F, and MQM-H announced a protest outside the Sindh Assembly. The protest was decided ahead of the February 24 Sindh Assembly session, where the newly elected members were to take oath. The next day when the first session of Sindh Assembly was called. PTI, GDA, and JI boycotted proceedings of the Sindh Assembly and staged demonstrations outside the assembly while dozens of Sindh police officers cordoned off access routes to prevent protests near the assembly building. Despite the protests, the situation remained tense as opposition parties ended the hours-long protest after being met with lathi charges and tear gas by police.

On 29 February, PTI-backed independent candidates also staged protests inside the National Assembly during its first session.

On 2 March, PTI leaders and workers once again clashed with the police as the party staged protests in 38 cities across Punjab. Police in Punjab reportedly thrashed and arrested several workers and leaders. The party claimed that around 80 protesters were arrested from Lahore alone, including Mian Shahzad Farooq and Afzaal Azeem Pahat, who contested the election against Maryam Nawaz and Shahbaz Sharif, respectively. In Islamabad, despite heavy rain, a large number of PTI workers also held the protest, which was led by the PTI's candidates from Islamabad. About 200 PTI activists as well PTI backed independent candidates were charged with FIRs (First Information Reports) in Bahawalpur, while another 100 were booked in Gujrat. The PTI alleged that one of its activists who was detained during the Lahore protest endured severe mistreatment in police custody and entered into a coma after sustaining significant head injuries.

On 10 March, the PTI organized another series of protests across the country in response to Imran Khan's call. The protests were suppressed by Punjab Police, as numerous leaders, activists, and supporters, including PTI leaders Salman Akram Raja, Latif Khosa as well as PTI MPAs from Lahore Hafiz Farhat Abbas, and Mian Muhammad Haroon Akbar, were reportedly beaten and detained at various locations in Lahore. Similar rallies were held in other cities such as Kasur, Sheikhupura, Gujranwala, Gujrat, Faisalabad, Toba Tek Singh, Rawalpindi, Sahiwal, Multan, Dera Ghazi Khan, Rahim Yar Khan, Layyah, Bahawalpur, and Muzaffargarh. PTI MPAs Muhammad Awais Virk, Tayyab Rashid, and Muhammad Sarfraz Dogar were detained in Sheikhupura. PTI leader Moonis Elahi accused Punjab Chief Minister Maryam Nawaz of orchestrating police actions against peaceful protestors. Protests also occurred in Islamabad, Quetta, and Peshawar.

On 12 April, a coalition comprising six opposition parties named as the Tehreek Tahafuz Ayeen-i-Pakistan (TTAP) was established, nominating Pashtunkhwa Milli Awami Party (PkMAP) chairman Mehmood Khan Achakzai as its president. The same day, Omar Ayub Khan announced that the alliance would initiate a nationwide protest movement to address alleged election rigging and advocate for the "restoration of the Constitution and democracy" across Pakistan. He said that the protest's inaugural gathering shall commence in Balochistan before expanding to other regions of the country.

== Investigation ==
On 21 February, a high-level committee of the ECP reportedly completed its investigation into the allegations of alleged rigging by Chattha. The committee's report included recorded statements of Returning Officers (ROs) and District Returning Officers (DROs) of 26 Provincial Assembly constituencies and 13 National Assembly constituencies of Rawalpindi Division.

In June 2024, the U.S. House of Representatives voted 368–7 to approve a resolution urging an independent investigation into alleged irregularities in Pakistan's election. The resolution condemned efforts to hinder democratic participation through harassment, intimidation, violence, arbitrary detention, and internet restrictions.
