= Gul Asghar Khan =

Pakistani politician and businessman (born 1978)

- گل اصغر خان
- Khan in 2026

Federal Parliamentary Secretary for the Ministry of Communications
- Incumbent
- Assumed office 13 September 2024
- President: Asif Ali Zardari
- Prime Minister: Shehbaz Sharif
- Constituency: NA-88 Khushab-II

Personal details
- Born: Malik Gul Asghar Khan Baghoor; 24 September 1978 (age 48) Adhi Kot, Punjab, Pakistan
- Party: IPP (2023–present)
- Other political affiliations: PTI (2013–2023)
- Occupation: Businessman; politician

Malik Gul Asghar Khan Baghoor (Note: Urdu: ملک گل اصغر خان بگھور) (born 24 September 1978) is a Pakistani politician and businessman who is serving as the Federal Parliamentary Secretary for Ministry of Communications since 2024. Khan is also the co-founder and chief executive officer of the telecom company Damcon based in Islamabad.

Born in Khushab, Punjab, Khan joined the Pakistan Tehreek-e-Insaf (PTI) in 2013 and later served as chairman of the Prime Minister Task Force (PMTF) under Prime Minister Imran Khan. In 2024, Khan joined the Istehkam-e-Pakistan Party (IPP) and was elected to the National Assembly of Pakistan from NA-88 Khushab-II in the 2024 election. He is serving as the IPP's chief whip and party president in North Punjab.

== Early life and family ==
Malik Gul Asghar Khan Baghoor was born on 24 September 1978 in the Adhi Kot village of Khushab District, Punjab, Pakistan, to a Punjabi Muslim family belonging to the Baghoor clan of Khokhars. He completed his BSc in engineering from the University of Engineering and Technology (UET), Lahore.

== Political career ==
Khan entered politics in 2013 when he joined the Pakistan Tehreek-e-Insaf (PTI), led by Imran Khan. He cited the Naya Pakistan manifesto of the PTI as being one of the primary reasons for him joining the party. He contested the NA-70 Khushab-II constituency in the 2013 election with the PTI's ticket, receiving 37,828 votes and ended up in third position, losing to the PML-N's candidate Malik Shakir Bashir Awan, who got 93,788 votes.

Gul Asghar Khan rose to becoming the PTI's additional general secretary in North Punjab and district president of the PTI in Khushab. Although Khan was initially guaranteed PTI's ticket for the NA-94 Khushab-II constituency in the 2018 election by Imran Khan, the constituency's ticket was later given to another PTI member Malik Ehsanullah Tiwana. This led to differences between Gul Asghar Khan and the PTI, eventually leading to his resignation from the party in 2018. He contested NA-94 Khushab-II constituency in the 2018 election as an independent candidate and ended up in third position with 43,779 votes, losing to PTI's candidate Malik Ehsanullah Tiwana. Khan nevertheless rejoined the PTI and was assigned as chairman of Prime Minister Task Force (PMTF) during Imran Khan's rule from 2018 to 2022.

In the aftermath of the 9 May riots, Gul Asghar Khan left the PTI and joined the Istehkam-e-Pakistan Party (IPP) in late 2023. He was elected to the National Assembly of Pakistan from NA-88 Khushab-II as a candidate of IPP in the 2024 Pakistani general election, being one of the only three IPP candidates to be elected, along with Aleem Khan and Aun Chaudhry. He received 82,577 votes while runner up Independent supported Pakistan Tehreek-e-Insaf, candidate Moazzam Sher received 64,156 votes.

In September 2024, he was appointed the federal parliamentary secretary for the ministry of communications under Minister of Communications Aleem Khan in the Second Shehbaz Sharif government. Gul Asghar Khan was also appointed chief whip of the IPP and the party's president in North Punjab.

== Personal life ==
Khan married a Chinese woman in c. 2008 and has a daughter.
