= Yasmin Rashid =

Pakistani politician

- یاسمِین راشِد
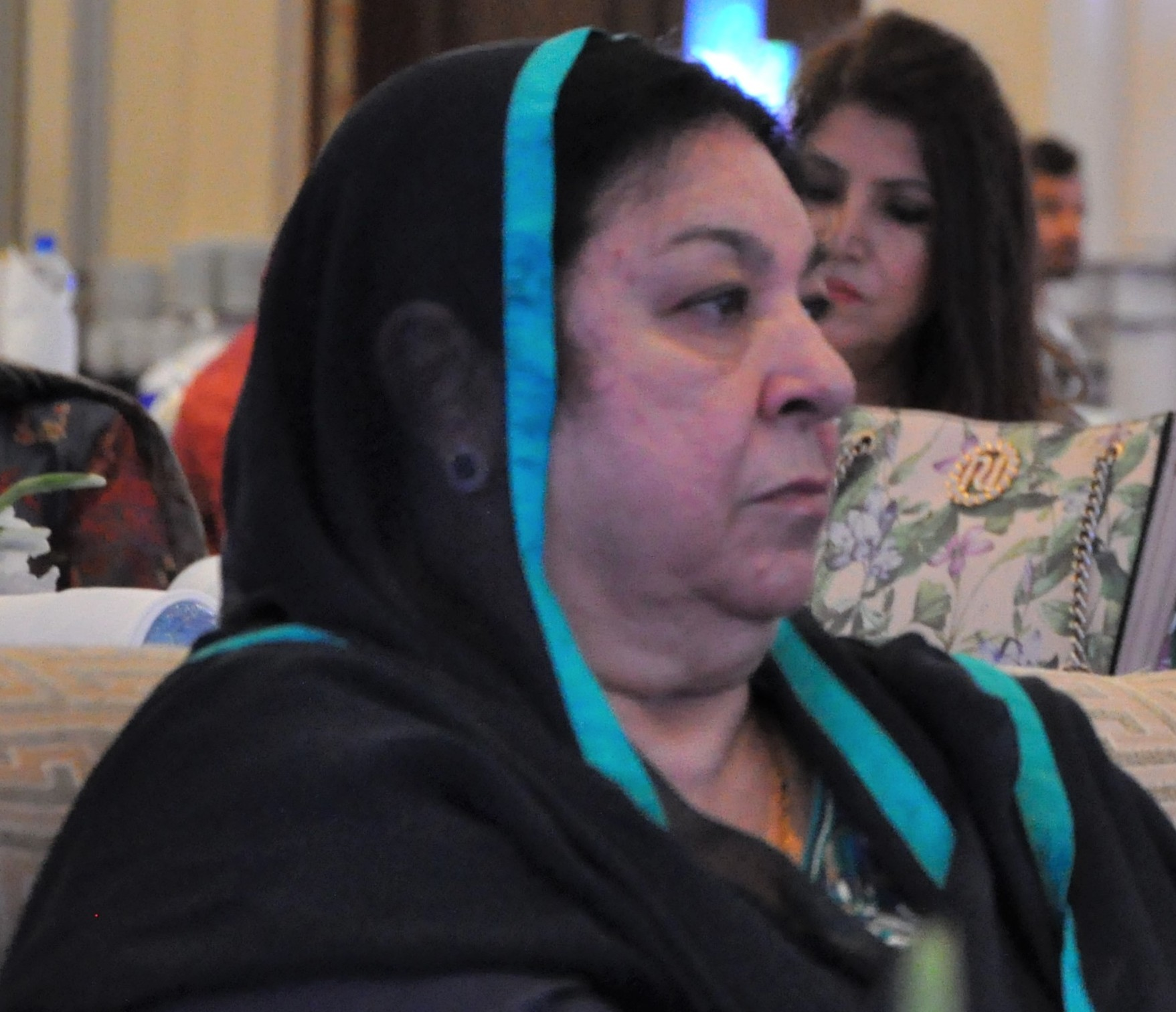
- Yasmin Rashid

President of PTI, Punjab, Pakistan
- In office 2 December 2023 – 10 September 2026
- Leader: Imran Khan; Gohar Ali Khan
- Preceded by: Salman Akram Raja
- Succeeded by: Hammad Azhar

President of PTI Punjab, Pakistan
- In office 4 June 2022 – 10 September 2026
- Leader: Imran Khan; Gohar Ali Khan

Provincial Minister of Punjab for Health
- In office 28 August 2018 – 14 January 2023
- Chief Minister: Usman Buzdar; Parvez Elahi

Member of the Provincial Assembly
- In office 15 August 2018 – 14 January 2023
- Constituency: Reserved Seat for Women

Personal details
- Born: 21 September 1950 (age 76) Chakwal, Punjab, Pakistan
- Spouse: Rashid Nabi Malik
- Relations: Malik Ghulam Nabi (father-in-law)

Yasmin Rashid (Urdu: یاسمِین راشِد; born 21 September 1950) is a Pakistani politician, medical doctor and social activist. Rashid held the position of Provincial Minister of Punjab for Primary and Secondary Healthcare and Specialised Healthcare & Medical Education, serving from August 2018 to April 2022, and later from July 2022 to January 2023. Additionally, Yasmin Rashid served as a member of the Provincial Assembly of the Punjab from August 2018 to January 2023.

== Early life and education ==
She was born on 21 September 1950 in Chakwal, Punjab, Pakistan.

She completed her early education in Neela village in Chakwal district before moving to Lahore where she was educated at the Convent of Jesus and Mary. She married in 1972.

In 1978, she did her MBBS from the Fatima Jinnah Medical University in Lahore. In 1984, she moved to the United Kingdom and enrolled in the Royal College of Obstetricians and Gynaecologists from where she received a MRCOG degree in 1989 and a FRCOG degree in 1999.

She then received a degree in FCPS from Karachi's College of Physicians and Surgeons Pakistan.

== Professional career ==
She served as the President of the Pakistan Medical Association Lahore from 1998 to 2000. She served as president of Pakistan Medical Association Punjab from 2008 to 2010 and has been the chairperson of the Task Force Women Development, and chairperson of the Women Health Committee in Punjab.

She is a gynaecologist by profession and had served as the head of the obstetrics and gynaecology department at King Edward Medical University. She also worked in Rawalpindi Medical University, Fatima Jinnah Medical University and headed the Genealogy department of Central Park Medical College.

== Political career ==
Rashid retired from government service in 2010 and joined Pakistan Tehreek-e-Insaf (PTI) on the advice of her father-in-law.

She ran for the seat of the National Assembly of Pakistan as a candidate of PTI from NA-120 (Lahore-III) but was unsuccessful and secured 52,354 votes against then President of Pakistan Muslim League (N) Nawaz Sharif who won with 91,683 votes.

In July 2017, after Nawaz Sharif was disqualified by the Supreme Court of Pakistan as a Member of the National Assembly following the Panama Papers case verdict, NA-120 (Lahore-III) seat fell vacant and by-polls were called in the constituency. PTI nominated Rashid to run for the seat of the National Assembly as its candidate in the by-polls held in September 2017. However she lost the polls to Kulsoom Nawaz Sharif by a margin of 14,646 votes.

During the 2018 elections, she again contested from the same constituency, which had now been delimited NA-125 (Lahore-III). She managed to secure 105,857 votes but was ultimately unsuccessful against PML-N's Waheed Alam Khan, who got 122,327 votes. She was later elected to the Provincial Assembly of the Punjab as a candidate of PTI on a reserved seat for women. On 27 August 2018, she was inducted into the provincial Punjab cabinet of Chief Minister Sardar Usman Buzdar and was appointed Provincial Minister of Punjab for Primary and Secondary Healthcare, with the additional ministerial portfolio of specialised healthcare and medical education.

=== 2024 Claimed Victory against Nawaz Sharif ===
She ran for a seat in the National Assembly from NA-130 Lahore-XIV against three-time former Prime Minister Nawaz Sharif of the PML-N as a candidate of the PTI in the 2024 Pakistani general election. She officially gained 104,485 votes and lost her seat to Nawaz, who gained 179,310 according to the ECP, though major allegations of rigging surfaced for the constituency, as Rashid claimed she won the seat against Nawaz by a large margin. Yasmin Rashid stated that Nawaz had officially won the seat due to rigging committed by him, and had added 74,000 votes to his name in a form of major election manipulation. She also alleged that ECP without following the due process, changed the Returning Officer, who later directed the police to restrain her agent and remove him from the polling station. The civil society organization, PATTAN concluded that NA-130 would face the worst rigging prior to the elections and stated that the ECP had rigged the election in ‘historic rigging’ in favor of Nawaz using pre-prepared Form 47s.

On 12 May 2023, Yasmin Rashid was arrested. The Lahore High Court has declared her case null and void still she has been detained for over 1 year while being a senior prisoner.

== Legal Issue ==
In May 2023, following the nationwide protests and riots that broke out after the arrest of Imran Khan, Dr. Yasmin Rashid was detained and subsequently faced multiple legal cases. In December 2025, an anti-terrorism court in Lahore sentenced her to 10 years in prison in connection with cases related to the May 9 riots.

== Family ==
She is married to Rashid Nabi Malik. Her husband belongs to a prominent political family. He is the son of the former Punjab Minister of Education Malik Ghulam Nabi. Her brother-in-law, Shahid Nabi Malik, remained affiliated with the Pakistan Peoples Party and was their candidate in the general elections in 1990 and 1993.
