= Uzair Khan =

Pakistani politician

- عزیر خان

Member of the National Assembly of Pakistan
- In office 27 January 2014 – 31 May 2018
- Constituency: NA-69 (Khushab)

Personal details
- Born: 13 August 1980 (age 46) Khushab, Punjab, Pakistan
- Other political affiliations: Pakistan Muslim League (N)
- Parent: Sumaira Malik (mother)
- Relatives: Amir Mohammad Khan (great-grand father)

Malik Uzair Khan (Urdu: ملک محمد عزیر خان) is a Pakistani politician who had been a member of the National Assembly of Pakistan from January 2014 to May 2018.

== Early life ==
He was born to Sumaira Malik.

== Political career ==
He was elected to the National Assembly of Pakistan as a candidate of Pakistan Muslim League (N) from Constituency NA-69 (Khushab-I) in by-election held in 2014. He received 92,805 votes and defeated Umer Aslam Awan, a candidate of Pakistan Tehreek-e-Insaf. The seat became vacant after his mother Sumaira Malik who won in 2013 general election was disqualified to continue in office because of fake degree case.
