= NA-88 Khushab-II =

Constituency of the National Assembly of Pakistan

- Constituency for the National Assembly of Pakistan
- Region: Quaidabad Tehsil, Noorpur Thal Tehsil and Khushab Tehsil (partly) of Khushab District
- Electorate: 451,307

Current constituency
- Party: Istehkam-e-Pakistan Party
- Member: Gul Asghar Khan
- Created from: NA-70 Khushab-II

NA-88 Khushab-II (این اے-88، خوشاب-۲) is a constituency for the National Assembly of Pakistan. It comprises Quaidabad Tehsil, Noorpur Thal Tehsil, and part of Khushab Tehsil in Khushab District. As of the 2024 general election, the constituency had 451,307 registered voters and is represented by Gul Asghar Khan of the Istehkam-e-Pakistan Party.

== Members of Parliament ==
=== 1988–2002: NA-52 Khushab ===
Election	Member	Party
1988	Malik Khuda Bakhsh Khan Tiwana	Independent
1990	Malik Khuda Bakhsh Khan Tiwana	IJI
1990 by-election	Malik Ghulam Muhammad Khan Tiwana	IJI
1993	Sardar Shuja Muhammad Khan Baloch	PML-N
1997	Sardar Shuja Muhammad Khan Baloch	PML-N

=== 2002–2018: NA-70 Khushab-II ===
Election	Member	Party
2002	Malik Muhammad Saifullah Tiwana	Independent
2008	Malik Shakir Bashir Awan	PML-N
2013	Malik Shakir Bashir Awan	PML-N

=== 2018–2023: NA-94 Khushab-II ===
Election	Member	Party
2018	Malik Muhammad Ehsanullah Tiwana	PTI

=== 2024–present: NA-88 Khushab-II ===
Election	Member	Party
2024	Gul Asghar Khan	IPP

== Election 2002 ==
General elections were held on 10 October 2002. Malik Muhammad Saifullah Tiwana an independent candidate won by 60,754 votes.

General election 2002: NA-70 Khushab-II
Party	Candidate	Votes	%	±%
Independent	Malik Muhammad Saifullah Tiwana	60,754	42.84	
PML(Q)	Malik Muhammad Shabbir Awan	52,983	37.36	
PML(N)	Dr. Ghaus Khan Niazi	23,074	16.27	
PPP	Sher Muhammad	4,658	3.29	
PMKP	Riaz Ahmed Khalil	340	0.24	
Turnout		144,884	56.48	
Total valid votes		141,809	97.88	
Rejected ballots		3,075	2.12	
Majority		7,771	5.48	
Registered electors		256,511		

== Election 2008 ==
The result of general election 2008 in this constituency is given below.

=== Result ===
Malik Shakir Bashir Awan succeeded in the election 2008 and became the member of National Assembly.

General election 2008: NA-70 Khushab-II
Party	Candidate	Votes	%	±%
PML(N)	Malik Shakir Bashir Awan	66,361	41.34	
Independent	Malik Ehsan Ullah Tiwana	58,906	36.70	
Independent	Sardar Shujja Muhammad Khan	29,187	18.18	
PPP	Malik Sultan Mehmood Wadhal Tiwana	6,070	3.78	
Turnout		166,333	60.75	
Total valid votes		160,524	96.51	
Rejected ballots		5,809	3.49	
Majority		7,455	4.64	
Registered electors		273,799		
PML(N) gain from Independent				

== Election 2013 ==
General elections were held on 11 May 2013. Malik Shakir Bashir Awan of PML-N won by 94,594 votes and became the member of National Assembly.

General election 2013: NA-70 Khushab-II
Party	Candidate	Votes	%	±%
PML(N)	Malik Shakir Bashir Awan	94,594	45.01	
Independent	Sardar Shujja Muhammad Khan	64,885	30.88	
PTI	Gul Asghar Khan	38,099	18.13	
Others	Others (five candidates)	12,564	5.98	
Turnout		216,978	63.09	
Total valid votes		210,142	96.85	
Rejected ballots		6,836	3.15	
Majority		29,709	14.13	
Registered electors		343,920		
PML(N) hold				

== Election 2018 ==
General elections were held on 25 July 2018.

General election 2018: NA-94 Khushab-II
Party	Candidate	Votes	%	±%
PTI	Malik Ehsan Ullah Tiwana	93,864	39.46	
PML(N)	Malik Shakir Bashir Awan	85,109	35.78	
Independent	Gul Asghar Khan	43,738	18.39	
Others	Others (five candidates)	6,383	2.69	
Turnout		237,851	59.49	
Rejected ballots		8,757	3.68	
Majority		8,755	3.68	
Registered electors		399,794		
PTI gain from PML(N)				

== Election 2024 ==
General elections were held on 8 February 2024 and re-polling was held on 15 February. Gul Asghar Khan won the election with 82,577 votes.

General election 2024: NA-88 Khushab-II
Party	Candidate	Votes	%	±%
IPP	Gul Asghar Khan	82,577	30.19	
PTI	Muhammad Akram Khan (Note: Filed nomination papers as PTI candidate but ECP allowed him to run as an independent)	64,156	23.46	
Independent	Muhammad Moazzam Sher	55,015	20.11	▼19.35
Independent	Haroon Bandial	47,137	17.23	
Others	Others (nine candidates)	24,621	9.00	
Turnout		281,919	62.47	▲2.98
Total valid votes		273,506	97.02	
Rejected ballots		8,413	2.98	
Majority		18,421	6.74	
Registered electors		451,307		
IPP gain from PTI				

== See also ==
- NA-87 Khushab-I
- NA-89 Mianwali-I
