= Malik Shakir Bashir Awan =

Pakistani politician

- ملک شاکربشیراعوان

Member of the National Assembly of Pakistan
- Incumbent
- Assumed office 29 February 2024
- Constituency: NA-87 Khushab-I
- In office 2008 – 31 May 2018
- Constituency: NA-70 (Khushab-II)

Personal details
- Born: 29 October 1965 (age 61)
- Party: PMLN (2008-present)

Malik Shakir Bashir Awan (Urdu: ملک شاکر بشیر اعوان; born 29 October 1965) is a Pakistani politician who has been a member of the National Assembly of Pakistan since February 2024 and previously served in this position from 2008 to May 2018.

== Early life ==
He was born on 29 October 1965.

== Political career ==
He was elected to the National Assembly of Pakistan as a candidate of Pakistan Muslim League (N) (PML-N) from Constituency NA-70 (Khushab-II) in the 2008 Pakistani general election. He received 66,361 votes and defeated an independent candidate, Malik Ehsan Ullah Tiwana.

He was re-elected to the National Assembly as a candidate of PML-N from Constituency NA-70 (Khushab-II) in the 2013 Pakistani general election. He received 94,594 votes and defeated an independent candidate, Sardar Shujja Muhammad Khan.

He contested the 2018 Pakistani general election as a candidate of PML-N from NA-94 Khushab-II, but was unsuccessful. He received 85,228 votes and was defeated by Malik Ehsan Ullah Tiwana, a candidate of Pakistan Tehreek-e-Insaf (PTI).

He was re-elected to the National Assembly as a candidate of PML-N from NA-87 Khushab-I in the 2024 Pakistani general election. He received 117,775 votes and defeated Umer Aslam Awan, an independent candidate supported by PTI.
