= Al-Britani =

Al-Britani is a nisba meaning "British" or from the United Kingdom.

- Abu Hussain al-Britani
- Umm Hussain al-Britani
- Issa al-Britani
- Abu-Zakariya al-Britani
- Abu Sa'eed al-Britani
- Abu Rumaysah al-Britani
