= Bilal Yasin =

Pakistani politician

Member of the Provincial Assembly of the Punjab
- Incumbent
- Assumed office 15 August 2018
- Constituency: PP-150 Lahore-VII
- In office 29 May 2013 – 31 May 2018
- Constituency: PP-139 (Lahore-III)
- In office 16 November 2002 – 17 November 2007
- Constituency: PP-139 (Lahore-III)

Member of the National Assembly of Pakistan
- In office 17 March 2008 – 16 March 2013
- Constituency: NA-120 (Lahore-III)

Personal details
- Born: 14 December 1970 (age 55) Lahore, Punjab, Pakistan
- Party: PMLN (2002-present)

Punjab Assembly Lahore

Bilal Yasin (Urdu: بلال یاسین; born 14 December 1970) is a Pakistani politician who had been a member of the Provincial Assembly of the Punjab from since August 2018. He had been a Member of the Provincial Assembly of the Punjab and an ex-cabinet member, from June 2013 to May 2018.

He had been a Member of the National Assembly of Pakistan from 2008 to 2013, from Nawaz Sharif constituency. He got over for national assembly election ticket in 2002, but declined .In December 2021 Bilal was shot, and both suspects were arrested.

== Early life and education ==
He was born on 14 December 1970 in Lahore to Yasin Pehalwan who was a cousin of Kulsoom Nawaz.

He graduated in 1990 from University of the Punjab and has the degree of Bachelor of Arts .

== Political career ==
He was elected to the Provincial Assembly of the Punjab from Constituency PP-139 (Lahore-III) as a candidate of Pakistan Muslim League (N) (PML-N) in the 2002 Pakistani general election. He received 17,171 votes and defeated Chaudhry Muhammad Asghar, a candidate of Pakistan Peoples Party (PPP).

He was elected to the National Assembly of Pakistan from Constituency NA-120 (Lahore-III) as a candidate of PML-N in the 2008 Pakistani general election. He received 65,946 votes and defeated Jehangir Bader.

He was re-elected to the Provincial Assembly of the Punjab as a candidate of PML-N from Constituency PP-139 in the 2013 Pakistani general election. He received 44,670 votes and defeated Mazhar Iqbal, a candidate of Pakistan Tehreek-e-Insaf (PTI). In June 2013, he was inducted into the provincial cabinet of Chief Minister Shahbaz Sharif and was made Provincial Minister of Punjab for Food.

He was re-elected to Provincial Assembly of the Punjab as a candidate of PML-N from Constituency PP-150 (Lahore-VII) in the 2018 Pakistani general election.
