= NA-87 Khushab-I =

Constituency of the National Assembly of Pakistan

- Constituency for the National Assembly of Pakistan
- Region: Naushera Tehsil and Khushab Tehsil (partly) including Khushab, Jauharabad and Hadali cities of Khushab District
- Electorate: 489,879

Current constituency
- Party: Pakistan Muslim League (N)
- Member: Malik Shakir Bashir Awan
- Created from: NA-69 Khushab-I

NA-87 Khushab-I (این اے-87، خوشاب-1) consists of 2 National Assembly (NA) and 3 Punjab Provincial Assembly constituencies.

== Members of Parliament ==
1946: Malik Khizar Hayat Tiwana

1962: NW-29, Sargodha-III
Nawabzadah Zakir Hussain Qureshi

Results: 1970, NW-42 Sargodha
Candidate Name	Party Name	Vote
Alhaj Malik Karam Bakhash Awan	Pakistan Muslim League - Convention (PML-C)	45513
Nasim Ahmad Tahir	PPP	29623
Anwar Khan	PMl-Con	26826
Malik Sher Muhammad	JUI	7321
Izhar Ahmad Qureishi	JI	7132
Malik Khuda Bux Awan	Independent	4990

14 Apr 1972 – 10 Jan 1977
MNA	Party	
Alhaj Malik Karam Bakhash Awan	Muslim League - Convention (ML-C)	NA-42
Nawabzada Mian Muhammad Zakir	Muslim League - Convention (ML-C)	NA-43

Results: 1977, NA-54 Sargodha
Candidate Name	Party Name	Vote
Alhaj Malik Karam Bakhash Awan	PPP	58327
Qazi Mureed Ahmad	Pakistan National Alliance (PNA)	21207
Ghulam Nabi Shah	Independent	7204
Mian Muhammad	Independent	1232
Ameer Abdullah	Independent	399

28 February 1985: NA-54 Khushab II
MNA	Votes
Malik Muhammad Naeem Khan Awan	51914
Al-haj Karam Bakhsh Awan	38604

=== 1988–2002: NA-51 Sargodha-cum-Khushab ===
Election	Member	Party
1988	Malik Naeem Khan Awan	IJI
1990	Malik Naeem Khan Awan	IJI
1993	Malik Naeem Khan Awan	PML-N
1997	Umer Aslam Awan	PML-N

=== 2002–2018: NA-69 Khushab-I ===
Election	Member	Party
2002	Sumaira Malik	NA
2008	Sumaira Malik	PML-Q
2013	Sumaira Malik	PML-N
2014 by-election	Malik Muhammad Uzair Khan	PML-N

=== 2018–2023: NA-93 Khushab-I ===
Election	Member	Party
2018	Umer Aslam Awan	PTI

=== 2024–present: NA-87 Khushab-I ===
Election	Member	Party
2024	Malik Shakir Bashir Awan	PML(N)

== Election 2002 ==
General elections were held on 10 October 2002. Sumaira Malik of National Alliance won by 71,925 votes.

General election 2002: NA-69 Khushab-I
Party	Candidate	Votes	%	±%
NA	Sumaira Malik	71,925	48.69	
PML(Q)	Malik Umer Aslam	58,247	39.43	
MMA	Muhammad Bakhsh	17,558	11.88	
Turnout		152,711	55.61	
Total valid votes		147,730	96.74	
Rejected ballots		5,041	3.26	
Majority		13,678	9.26	
Registered electors		274,728		

== Election 2008 ==
The result of general election 2008 in this constituency is given below.

=== Result ===
Sumaira Malik succeeded in the election 2008 and became the member of National Assembly.

General election 2008: NA-69 Khushab-I
Party	Candidate	Votes	%	±%
PML(Q)	Sumaira Malik	61,076	37.24	
Independent	Umer Aslam Awan	60,443	36.85	
Independent	Malik Tanvir Sultan Awan	39,133	23.86	
PPP	Malik Irfan Ahmad Gheba	3,372	2.06	
Turnout		170,141	59.93	
Total valid votes		164,024	96.41	
Rejected ballots		6,117	3.59	
Majority		633	0.39	
Registered electors		283,887		
PML(Q) gain from NA				

== Election 2013 ==
General elections were held on 11 May 2013. Sumaira Malik of PML-N won the seat and became the member of National Assembly.

General election 2013: NA-69 Khushab-I
Party	Candidate	Votes	%	±%
PML(N)	Sumaira Malik	119,193	59.17	
PTI	Umer Aslam Awan	80,331	39.88	
Others	Others (two candidates)	1,935	0.95	
Turnout		209,275	62.18	▲2.25
Total valid votes		201,459	96.27	
Rejected ballots		7,816	3.73	
Majority		38,862	19.29	
Registered electors		336,551		
PML(N) gain from PML(Q)				

== By-election 2014 ==
A by-election was held on 23 January 2014 due to the disqualification of Sumaira Malik, the previous MNA from this seat. Uzair Khan, her son, won the election with 92,481 votes.

By-election 2014: NA-69 Khushab-I
Party	Candidate	Votes	%	±%
PML(N)	Uzair Khan	92,481	56.09	▼3.08
PTI	Umer Aslam Awan	72,100	43.73	▲3.85
JUI (F)	Malik Zafar Borrana	311	0.19	
Majority		20,381	12.36	▼6.93
Turnout		164,892	48.83	▼13.35
Registered electors		337,654		
PML(N) hold				

== Election 2018 ==
General elections were held on 25 July 2018. Umer Aslam Awan won the election 100,448 votes.

General election 2018: NA-93 Khushab-I
Party	Candidate	Votes	%	±%
PTI	Umer Aslam Awan	100,448	40.49	▼3.24
PML(N)	Sumaira Malik	70,401	28.38	▼27.71
Independent	Malik Mazhar Iqbal Awan	32,498	13.10	
Independent	Muhammad Ali Sawal	23,482	9.47	
Others	Others (four candidates)	13,294	5.36	
Turnout		248,086	57.86	▲9.03
Rejected ballots		7,963	3.20	
Majority		30,047	12.11	
Registered electors		428,736		
PTI gain from PML(N)				

== Election 2024 ==
General elections were held on 8 February 2024. Malik Shakir Bashir Awan won the election with 117,775 votes.

General election 2024: NA-87 Khushab-I
Party	Candidate	Votes	%	±%
PML(N)	Malik Shakir Bashir Awan	117,775	43.40	▲15.02
PTI	Umer Aslam Awan (Note: Filed nomination papers as PTI candidate but ECP allowed him to run as an Independent)	108,314	39.91	▼0.58
PPP	Muhammad Ali Sawal	14,998	5.53	▲4.21
TLP	Zamurd Abbas Khan	14,955	5.51	
Others	Others (seven candidates)	15,321	5.65	
Turnout		273,165	55.76	▼2.10
Total valid votes		271,363	99.34	
Rejected ballots		1,802	0.66	
Majority		9,461	3.49	
Registered electors		489,879		
PML(N) gain from PTI				

== See also ==
- NA-86 Sargodha-V
- NA-88 Khushab-II
