= NA-128 Lahore-XII =

Constituency of the National Assembly of Pakistan

- Constituency for the National Assembly of Pakistan
- Region: Lahore City area of Lahore District
- Electorate: 678,006

Current constituency
- Created: 2018
- Party: Istehkam-e-Pakistan Party
- Member: Aun Chaudhry
- Created from: NA-122 (Lahore-V); NA-126 (Lahore-IX)

NA-128 Lahore-XII ( این اے-128، لاہور-12) is a newly-created constituency for the National Assembly of Pakistan. It mainly comprises the Model Town Tehsil along with areas of Lahore Cantonment Tehsil, Walton Cantonment and Lahore City Tehsil.

== Members of Parliament ==
=== 2018–2023: NA-130 Lahore-VIII ===
Election	Member	Party
2018	Shafqat Mahmood	PTI

=== 2024–present: NA-128 Lahore-XII ===
Election	Member	Party
2024	Aun Chaudhry	IPP

== Election 2018 ==
General elections were held on 25 July 2018.

General election 2018: NA-130 Lahore-VIII
Party	Candidate	Votes	%	±%
PTI	Shafqat Mahmood	127,405	50.51	
PML(N)	Khawaja Ahmed Hassan	104,625	41.48	
Others	Others (eight candidates)	20,228	8.01	
Turnout		256,446	52.99	
Total valid votes		252,258	98.37	
Rejected ballots		4,188	1.63	
Majority		22,780	9.03	
Registered electors		483,914		

== Election 2024 ==
General elections were held on 10 February 2024.

Independent journalists such as Secunder Kermani expected PTI-backed independent Salman Akram Raja to overwhelmingly win the seat, on the basis of voter interviews. However, while Form 45 from the Election Commission of Pakistan showed Raja with a decisive lead, Form 47 reported Aun Chaudhry of Istehkam-e-Pakistan Party as having won 172,576 votes to Raja's 159,024 votes. Raja, PTI supporters, and independent journalists claimed the ECP Form 47 results showed clear evidence of rigging by the Pakistan Army, and the Lahore High Court issued a stay on a final declaration of the results by ECP until a hearing could be fixed to investigate the matter. The ECP had officially withdrawn the notification of Chaudhry's victory, but published it again a couple of days later.

General election 2024: NA-128 Lahore-XII
Party	Candidate	Votes	%	±%
IPP	Aun Chaudhry	172,578	45.77	
PTI	Salman Akram Raja (Note: Filed nomination papers as PTI candidate but ECP allowed him to run as an Independent)	159,026	42.18	▼8.33
Others	Others (twenty candidates)	45,434	12.05	
Turnout		381,466	56.27	▲3.28
Total valid votes		377,038	98.84	
Rejected ballots		4,428	1.16	
Majority		13,552	3.59	
Registered electors		678,006		
IPP gain from PTI				

== See also ==
- NA-127 Lahore-XI
- NA-129 Lahore-XIII
