= Malik Naeem Khan Awan =

Pakistani politician

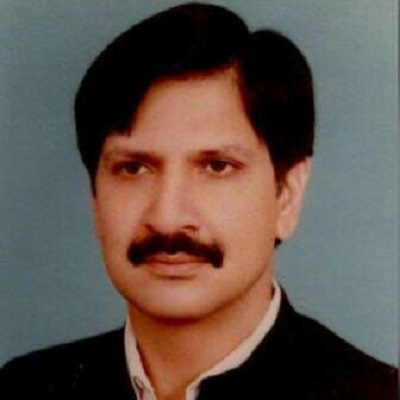
- Born: November 6, 1951
- Died: December 11, 2017 (aged 66)

Malik Naeem Khan Awan was a Pakistani politician belonging to an Awan tribe of Khushab District in north-eastern Punjab, Pakistan. He served as Federal Minister for Commerce and Provincial Minister for Irrigation. He was a member of the National Assembly representing the NA-69 constituency from 1985 to 1996. Awan was a member of the Muslim League Nawaz.

== Career ==
In the 7th Assembly elections 1985 - 88, held on 20/3/85. Malik Naeem Khan won having votes 51,914 and his opponent Malik Karam Bakhsh Awan gaining votes 38,604. In the 8th Assembly Elections 1988–90, held on 30/11/88. Malik Naeem Khan Awan (Islami Jamhoori Ittehad) won with a majority votes of 81,522 and his opponent Mian Muhammad Sultan Awan of Pakistan people Party 47,906 got 2nd in the elections leaving other Independent Candidates behind. In the 9th National Assembly Elections 1990–93, held on 3/11/90. Malik Naeem Khan Awan (Islami Jamhoori Ittehad) won again with a majority votes having 84,908 and his opponent Malik Muhammad Bashir Awan Independent Candidate got 61,804 votes. In the 10th National Assembly Elections 1993–96, held on 15/10/93. Malik Naeem Khan Awan (Pakistan Muslim League-N) won 81,565 votes against Malik Muhammad Bashir Awan (Pakistan Peoples Party) and Qari Amman Ullah (Islami Jamhoori Ittehad) having votes 67,693 and 1,313 respectively. It is clear from the previous records that whichever party is, Malik Naeem Khan Awan won with a great majority. It is the love for Malik Naeem Khan Awan from the people of District Khushab. He was very popular among the people. He was a statesman. He felt happy amongst people. He concerned for his people and worked for their well-being. He called politics "welfare of people". And that was the only reason for him to be in politics. He was son of Brigadier (R) Malik Sawal Awan and his Brother Malik Saleem Khan Awan was a two star Army General.Malik Naeem Khan Awan died on 11 December 2017. Punjab Chief Minister expressed deep sense of sorrow and grief over his death. His nephew and his successor in politics Malik Umer Aslam Awan became MNA From Constituency NA69 in February 1997 but lost in series 2002, 2008, 2013 versus Sumaira Malik and bi-Election 2013 against her son Malik Uzair Awan as she was disqualified by the Election Commission on basis of fake degree but afterwards allegations were removed and she participated in 2018 General Elections and lost. Malik Umer Aslam Awan won the election of 2018 from the ticket of PTI NA-93 in District Khushab. He has the same aim of welfare of the people. Despite losing three times in a row, he didn't lose hope and won with a majority this time.He has done many welfare projects in the Khushab since 2018.
