= Opinion polling for the 2018 Pakistani general election =

General elections were held in Pakistan on 25 July 2018. Since the previous general election, several pollsters conducted opinion polls at both the national and provincial levels.

== Graphical summaries ==
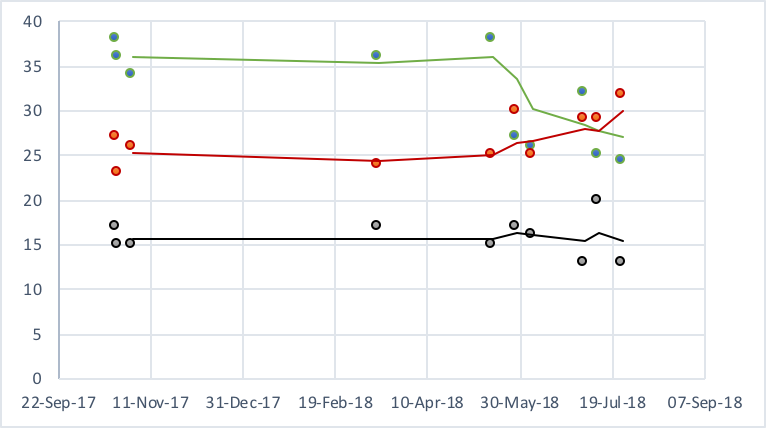
Each coloured line specifies a political party and how strong their voting intention is nationwide for the National Assembly, based on a 3 point moving average. Parties which poll below 10% are not shown. Pakistan Muslim League (N) Pakistan Tehreek-e-Insaf Pakistan Peoples Party

== Nationwide voting intention ==
Voting intention polls conducted since 2013 for the National Assembly.

Date	Pollster	Publisher	Sample	PML-N	PTI	PPP	MQM-P	MMA*	ANP	Others	Lead
25 July 2018	Election 2018	ECP	53,123,733	24.35%	31.82%	13.01%	1.38%	4.81%	1.53%	22.98%	7.47%
12 Jul 2018	SDPI	Herald	6,004	25%	29%	20%	—N/a	3%	1%	20%	4%
04 Jul 2018	IPOR	GSP	3,735	32%	29%	13%	2%	3%	1%	20%	3%
06 Jun 2018	Gallup Pakistan	Geo/Jang	3,000	26%	25%	16%	—N/a	2%	1%	30%	1%
28 May 2018	Pulse Consultant	Geo/Jang	3,163	27%	30%	17%	1%	4%	1%	20%	3%
May 2018	Gallup Pakistan	Self	3,000	38%	25%	15%	22%				13%
Mar 2018	Gallup Pakistan	WSJ	2,000	36%	24%	17%	23%				12%
01 Nov 2017	Gallup Pakistan	Geo/Jang	3,000	34%	26%	15%	2%	2%	2%	19%	8%
25 Oct 2017	Pulse Consultant	Geo/Jang	3,243	36%	23%	15%	2%	1%	1%	22%	13%
24 Oct 2017	IPOR	GSP	4,540	38%	27%	17%	3%	1%	1%	14%	11%
24 Apr 2017	Gallup Pakistan	Self	1,400	36%	25%	16%	2%	3%	2%	16%	11%
24 Apr 2017	Gallup Pakistan	Self	1,400	38%	22%	17%	2%	2%	2%	14%	16%
27 Aug 2015	SDPI	Self	3,014	27%	33%	14%	1%	2%	1%	20%	6%
17 Jul 2014	SDPI	Herald	1,354	17%	33%	19%	5%	3%	3%	18%	14%
11 May 2013	Election 2013	ECP	45,388,404	32.77%	16.92%	15.23%	5.41%	3.22%	1.00%	25.57%	15.85%

*Muttahida Majlis-e-Amal is an alliance of Islamist political parties, formed in 2002 and dissolved after the 2008 elections. The restoration of this alliance occurred in December 2017. Polls conducted before the restoration show the sum for Jamiat Ulema-e-Islam (F), the major political party in this alliance.

== Province-wide voting intention ==
Voting intention polls conducted for each of the provinces. If a party has N/A listed in the poll, this indicates it is in the 'Others' section of the poll. If a certain poll result is bolded, this indicates that the option has achieved over 50% of the vote.

=== Punjab ===
Date	Pollster	Legislature type	PML (N)	PTI	PPP	Others	Lead
25 July 2018	Election 2018	Provincial	31.8%	33.7%	5.4%	29.1%	1.9%
12 Jul 2018	SDPI	unspecified	40%	33%	7%	20%	7%
04 Jul 2018	IPOR	National	**50%**	31%	5%	14%	**19%**
06 Jun 2018	Gallup Pakistan	unspecified	40%	26%	6%	28%	14%
02 Jun 2018	IPOR	unspecified	**51%**	30%	5%	14%	**21%**
28 May 2018	Pulse Consultant	unspecified	43%	34%	5%	18%	9%
01 Nov 2017	Gallup Pakistan	unspecified	**50%**	31%	5%	14%	**19%**
25 Oct 2017	Pulse Consultant	unspecified	**55%**	20%	7%	18%	**35%**
24 Oct 2017	IPOR	National	**58%**	23%	6%	13%	**35%**
27 Aug 2015	SDPI	National	38%	35%	7%	20%	3%
17 Jul 2014	SDPI	Provincial	25%	43%	11%	21%	18%
11 May 2013	Election 2013	Provincial	40.8%	17.8%	8.8%	32.6%	23.0%

=== Sindh ===
Date	Pollster	Legislature type	PPP	MQM (P)	GDA*	PTI	PML (N)	Others	Lead
25 July 2018	Election 2018	Provincial	38.4%	7.7%	14.9%	14.2%	2.4%	22.4%	23.5%
12 Jul 2018	SDPI	unspecified	**54%**	2%	10%	14%	4%	16%	**40%**
04 Jul 2018	IPOR	National	35%	7%	5%	18%	10%	25%	17%
06 Jun 2018	Gallup Pakistan	unspecified	44%	—N/a		9%	4%	43%	35%
28 May 2018	Pulse Consultant	unspecified	45%	5%	—N/a	11%	4%	35%	34%
01 Nov 2017	Gallup Pakistan	unspecified	44%	10%	—N/a		11%	35%	33%
25 Oct 2017	Pulse Consultant	unspecified	46%	7%	—N/a	10%	—N/a	37%	36%
24 Oct 2017	IPOR	National	**52%**	11%	2%	14%	12%	7%	**38%**
27 Aug 2015	SDPI	National	41%	5%	—N/a	21%	13%	20%	20%
17 July 2014	SDPI	Provincial	**50%**	20%	5%	25%			**30%**
11 May 2013	Election 2013	Provincial	32.6%	25.5%	11.6%	6.2%	6.0%	18.1%	7.1%

*The “Grand Democratic Alliance” is an alliance of political parties which was formed in late 2017. Polls before this show the sum for PML-F, the major party in this alliance before its formation

=== Khyber Pakhtunkhwa ===
Date	Pollster	Legislature type	PTI	PML (N)	MMA	ANP	Others	Lead
25 July 2018	Election 2018	Provincial	32.3%	9.9%	17.1%	12.2%	28.5%	15.2%
12 Jul 2018	SDPI	unspecified	43%	10%	11%	6%	30%	31%
04 Jul 2018	IPOR	National	45%	12%	6%	8%	29%	33%
06 Jun 2018	Gallup Pakistan	unspecified	**57%**	9%	6%	6%	22%	**48%**
28 May 2018	Pulse Consultant	unspecified	**57%**	10%	9%	7%	17%	**47%**
01 Nov 2017	Gallup Pakistan	unspecified	47%	10%	43%			37%
25 Oct 2017	Pulse Consultant	unspecified	**53%**	13%	34%			**40%**
24 Oct 2017	IPOR	National	**62%**	10%	1%	5%	22%	**52%**
27 Aug 2015	SDPI	National	**50%**	15%	7%	7%	21%	**35%**
17 Jul 2014	SDPI	Provincial	40%	—N/a	13%	12%	35%	27%
11 May 2013	Election 2013	Provincial	19.3%	15.9%	13.6%	10.3%	40.9%	3.4%

=== Balochistan ===
Date	Pollster	Legislature type	MMA	PMAP	PML (N)	BNP	NP	PPP	ANP	PTI	BAP	Other's	Lead
25 July 2018	Election 2018	Provincial	14.9%	1.5%	6.5%	7.0%	4.9%	3.1%	2.7%	6.0%	24.6%	28.8%	9.7%
12 Jul 2018	SDPI	unspecified	8%	4%	11%	6%	—N/a	15%	—N/a	11%	45%		4%
04 Jul 2018	IPOR	National	12%	10%	5%	5%	5%	16%	4%	8%	7%	35%	4%
06 Jun 2018	Gallup Pakistan	unspecified	23%	9%	2%	14%	11%	20%	4%	5%	12%		3%
28 May 2018	Pulse Consultant	unspecified	11%	4%	2%	6%	5%	36%	3%	12%	7%	14%	24%
01 Nov 2017	Gallup Pakistan	unspecified	22%	18%	16%	13%	5%	7%	4%	5%	—N/a	10%	4%
25 Oct 2017	Pulse Consultant	unspecified	5%	0%	39%	8%	0%	5%	7%	21%	—N/a	15%	18%
24 Oct 2017	IPOR	National	—N/a	6%	15%	8%	1%	9%	2%	33%	—N/a	26%	18%
27 Aug 2015	SDPI	National	18%	—N/a	5%	—N/a		10%	12%	4%	—N/a	51%	6%
17 July 2014	SDPI	Provincial	—N/a			23%	22%	—N/a		14%	—N/a	41%	1%
11 May 2013	Election 2013	Provincial	15.8%	12.8%	10.3%	6.2%	5.8%	4.0%	2.4%	1.8%	—N/a	40.9%	3.0%

== Constituency-wide voting intention ==
Colour key

† Exit Poll

‡ By election result

=== NA-28 (Peshawar-II) ===
Date	Pollster	Sample	PTI	PML (N)	JI	ANP	PPP	Others	Lead
26 Oct 2017‡	By-election 2017	131,298	34.8%	18.9%	5.4%	18.9%	10.0%	12.1%	15.9%
26 Oct 2017†	CPDI	1,742	43%	16%	8%	20%	9%	6%	23%
19 Oct 2017	IPOR	1,313	41%	18%	4%	9%	9%	19%	25%
11 May 2013	Election 2013	138,555	39.8%	14.7%	11.9%	11.4%	8.7%	13.5%	25.1%

=== NA-63 (Rawalpindi-VII) ===
Date	Pollster	Sample	PTI	Ind (Ch.)	PML (N)	PPP	Others	Lead
25 July 2018	Election 2018	215,669	46.8%	30.5	10.7%	1.2%	10.8%	16.3%
28 Feb 2018	IPOR	598	37%	41%		2%	20%	4%
11 May 2013	Election 2013	236,624	46.6%	43.2%		6.3%	3.9%	3.4%

=== NA-125 (Lahore-III) ===
Date	Pollster	Sample	PML (N)	PTI	Others	Lead
25 July 2018	Election 2018	250,254	48.9%	42.3%	8.8%	7.6%
17 September 2017‡	By-election 2017	125,129	49.4%	37.6%	13.0%	11.8%
17 September 2017†	CPDI	1,433	46%	40%	14%	6%
12 September 2017	Pulse Consultant	1,520	62%	23%	15%	39%
10 September 2017	Gallup Pakistan	1,500	53%	29%	18%	24%
06 September 2017	IPOR	2,198	49%	34%	17%	15%
11 May 2013	Election 2013	153,328	60.5%	34.6%	4.9%	25.9%

== Polling on Politicians ==
=== Polling on the disqualification of Nawaz Sharif from office ===
Date	Pollster	Sample	Agree (Right)	Disagree (Wrong)	Don’t Know	Lead
05 April 2018	Gallup Pakistan	1,586	53%	40%	7%	13%
01 Nov 2017	Gallup Pakistan	3,000	55%	33%	11%	22%
01 Nov 2017	Gallup Pakistan	3,000	54%	31%	15%	23%
25 Oct 2017	Pulse Consultant	3,243	48%	31%	21%	17%
25 Oct 2017	Pulse Consultant	3,243	47%	28%	25%	19%
24 Oct 2017	GSP	4,540	65%	33%	2%	32%
24 Oct 2017	GSP	4,540	69%	28%	3%	39%
28 July 2017	Prime Minister Nawaz Sharif is disqualified from office by the Supreme Court					

=== Nawaz Sharif vs Imran Khan ===
Date	Pollster	Nawaz Sharif	Imran Khan	Don’t Know	Lead
May 2018	Gallup Pakistan	50%	45%	5%	5%
March 2018	Gallup Pakistan	49%	46%	5%	3%
(undefined) 2017	Gallup Pakistan	51%	39%	10%	12%
(undefined) 2016	Gallup Pakistan	57%	37%	6%	20%
(undefined) 2015	Gallup Pakistan	59%	35%	6%	24%
