= Adhi Kot (meteorite) =

Meteorite landing on Earth

- Type: Chondrite
- Class: Enstatite chondrite
- Group: EH4
- Country: Pakistan
- Region: Punjab
- Coordinates: 32°6′N 71°48′E
- Observed fall: Yes
- Fall date: 1 May 1919
- TKW: 4.24 kg

Adhi Kot is a meteorite that fell on 1 May 1919 in the Punjab region, located in now Pakistan. The meteorite is named after the Adhi Kot village in whose area it fell at 32°16′N 71°49′E at 12 pm, 15 miles (24 km) north of station Nurpur, Shahpur District (the area was part of the old Shahpur District during British Rule). It was classified as an enstatite chondrite type EH4.

== See also ==
- Glossary of meteoritics
- Meteorite fall
