= Murad Raas =

Pakistani politician

Provincial Minister of Punjab for School Education
- In office 27 August 2018 – 14 January 2023

Member of the Provincial Assembly of the Punjab
- In office 15 August 2018 – 14 January 2023
- Constituency: PP-159 Lahore-XVI
- In office 29 May 2013 – 31 May 2018
- Constituency: PP-152 (Lahore-XVI)

President of IPP Lahore Division
- In office 12 August 2023 – 3 August 2025
- President: Aleem Khan; Jahangir Tareen

Personal details
- Born: 6 June 1969 (age 57) Gujrat, Punjab, Pakistan
- Party: IPP (2023–present); PTI (2013–2023)

Murad Raas (born 6 June 1969) is a Pakistani politician who is the former Provincial Minister of Punjab for School Education, in office from 27 August 2018 to 2021. He had been a member of the Provincial Assembly of the Punjab from August 2018 till January 2023. Previously he was a Member of the Provincial Assembly of the Punjab from May 2013 to May 2018.

== Early life and education ==
He was born on 6 June 1969 in Gujrat. He received his early education from Aitchison College. He has the degree of Bachelor of Business Administration in Finance which he obtained in 1993 from Eastern Kentucky University. He received an Honorary degree of Doctor of Philosophy in Business Administration in 2010 from the American Heritage University of Southern California. He allegedly holds an American citizenship.

== Political career ==
He was elected to the Provincial Assembly of the Punjab as a candidate of the Pakistan Tehreek-e-Insaf (PTI) from PP-152 (Lahore-XVI) in the 2013 Punjab provincial election.

He was re-elected to the Provincial Assembly of the Punjab as a candidate of the PTI from PP-159 (Lahore-XVI) in the 2018 Punjab provincial election.

On 27 August 2018, he was inducted into the provincial cabinet of Chief Minister Usman Buzdar and was appointed the Provincial Minister of Punjab for School Education.
