= Chaudhry Faisal Farooq Cheema =

Pakistani politician (born 1970)

Member of the Provincial Assembly of the Punjab
- In office 15 August 2018 – 14 January 2023
- Constituency: PP-76 Sargodha-V
- In office 1 June 2013 – 31 May 2018
- Constituency: PP-35 (Sarghoda-VIII)
- In office 25 November 2002 – 17 November 2007
- Constituency: PP-35 (Sarghoda-VIII)

Personal details
- Born: 10 July 1970 (age 56) Sargodha, Punjab, Pakistan
- Party: IPP (2023-present)
- Other political affiliations: PTI (2018-2023); PMLN (2008-2018); PML(Q) (2002-2007)

Punjab Assembly Lahore

Chaudhry Faisal Farooq Cheema is a Pakistani politician who was a Member of the Provincial Assembly of Punjab, from 2002 to 2007 and again from May 2013 to May 2018.

== Early life and education ==
He was born on 10 July 1970 in Sargodha.

He has a Master of Arts degree which he received in 1997 from Government College, Sargodha.

== Political career ==
He was elected to the Provincial Assembly of the Punjab as a candidate of Pakistan Muslim League (Q) (PML-Q) from PP-35 (Sarghoda-VIII) in the 2002 Punjab provincial election. He received 35,571 votes and defeated Sardar Kamil Gujjar, a candidate of Pakistan Peoples Party (PPP).

He ran for the seat of the Provincial Assembly of the Punjab as a candidate of the Pakistan Muslim League (N) (PML-N) from PP-35 (Sarghoda-VIII) in the 2008 Punjab provincial election but was unsuccessful. He secured 32,753 votes and lost the seat to Sardar Kamil Gujjar, a candidate of PPP.

He was re-elected to the Provincial Assembly of the Punjab as an independent candidate from PP-35 (Sarghoda-VIII) in the 2013 Punjab provincial election. He received 41,853 votes and defeated Sardar Kamil Gujjar, a candidate of PML-N. He joined PML-N in May 2013. In April 2018, he quit PML-N and joined the Pakistan Tehreek-e-Insaf (PTI).

He was re-elected to Provincial Assembly of the Punjab as a candidate of the PTI from PP-76 (Sargodha-V) in the 2018 Punjab provincial election.
