= Malik Ghulam Nabi =

Pakistani politician

Provincial Minister of Punjab for Education
- In office 1972–1973

Member of the Provincial Assembly of the Punjab
- In office 1972–1977

Personal details
- Born: 1911 Amritsar, British Raj
- Died: 2009 (aged 97–98) Lahore, Pakistan
- Party: Pakistan Peoples Party
- Relations: Yasmin Rashid (daughter-in-law)

Malik Ghulam Nabi (1911-2009) was a Pakistani politician who served as the Punjab Minister for Education in 1970 and 1977. He was also the member of the Provincial Assembly of the Punjab in 1970 and 1977.

He uses Malik as title like many others in kpk and punjab.
