= 2017 NA-120 by-election =

2017 Pakistani by-election

2017 Lahore by-election
← 2013	17 September 2017	2018 →

NA-120 Lahore constituency
- Opinion polls
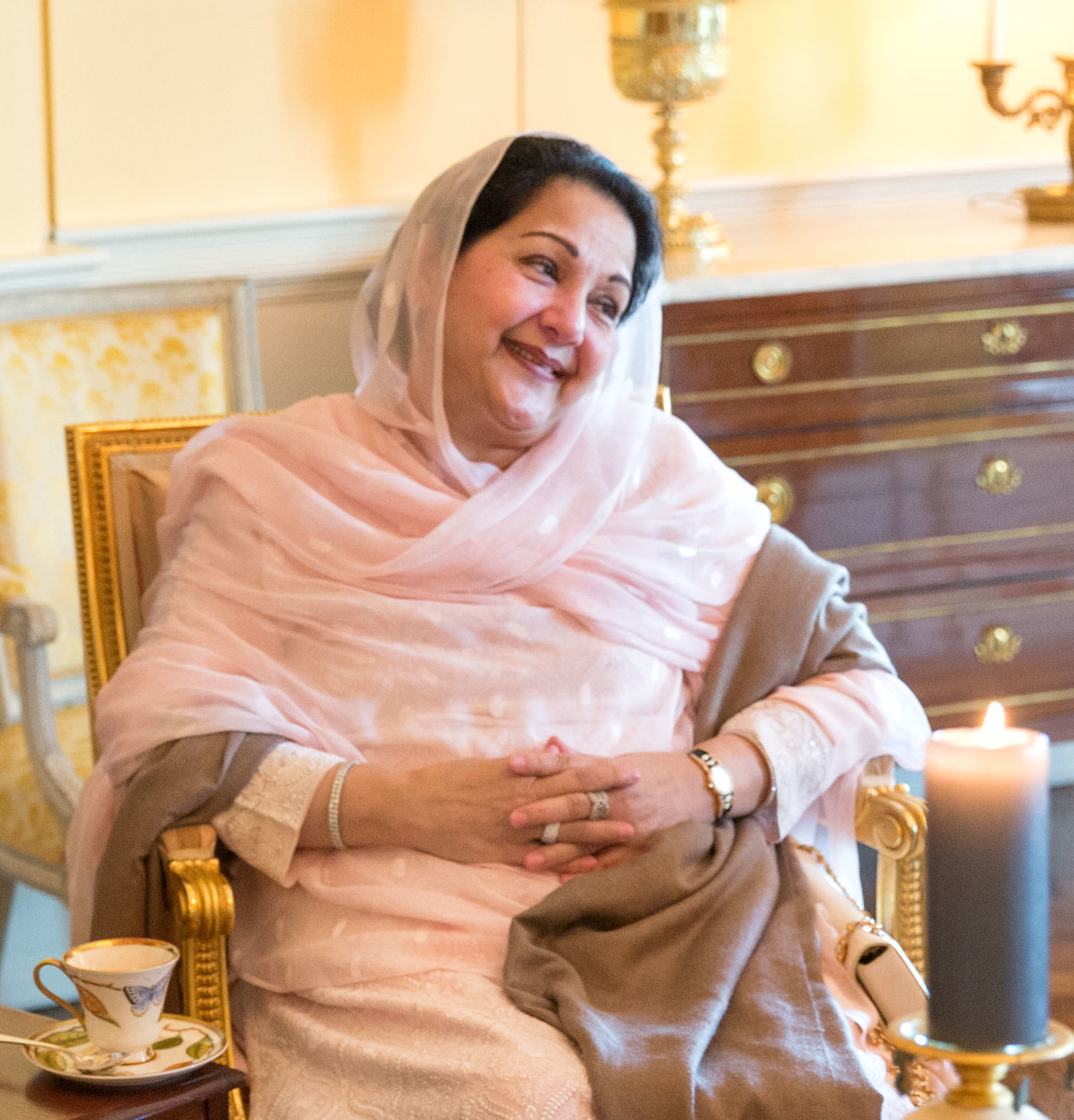

	First party	Second party
Candidate	Kulsoom Nawaz Sharif	Yasmin Rashid
Party	PML(N)	PTI
Popular vote	61,745	47,099
Percentage	49.35	37.64
Swing	▼11.19	▲3.08
- Lahore District in Punjab (Pakistan)
MNA before election
Nawaz Sharif
PML (N)
Elected MNA
Kulsoom Nawaz Sharif
PML (N)

There was a by-election in the Pakistani parliamentary constituency of NA-120 on 17 September 2017, following the decision given by the Supreme Court of Pakistan to disqualify Prime Minister Nawaz Sharif from public office. PML (N) candidate Kulsoom Nawaz Sharif secured 61,745 votes and defeated Yasmin Rashid of Pakistan Tehreek-e-Insaf.

== Background ==
Following the decision given by the Supreme Court of Pakistan to disqualify Prime Minister Nawaz Sharif from public office, a by-election was triggered in his NA-120 constituency.

Immediately, speculation arose of PML (N) choosing the current Chief Minister of Punjab Shehbaz Sharif as a candidate for NA-120 as well as Prime Minister. Later on, however, Shehbaz Sharif was said to be continuing his position as Chief Minister of Punjab until 2018, ruling him out as a candidate. Subsequently, Nawaz Sharif's wife, Kulsoom Nawaz, was chosen as the candidate for PML (N).

== Campaign ==
The main challenger of Kulsoom Nawaz for the seat was Dr. Yasmin Rashid of PTI, who also contested the seat in 2013. She ran primarily on the issue that Nawaz Sharif and PML (N) were “corrupt” and that they did not do much for the constituency. The PML (N) campaign was run by Nawaz's daughter, Maryam Nawaz Sharif, who claimed that the Supreme Court ruling was unfair and that Nawaz Sharif was the legitimate Prime Minister.

== Result ==
=== Previous result ===
Nawaz Sharif won this seat with 91,666 votes.

General Election 2013: NA-120 (Lahore-III)
Party	Candidate	Votes	%
PML(N)	Nawaz Sharif	91,666	60.54
PTI	Dr. Yasmin Rashid	52,321	34.56
PPP	Zubair Kardar	2,604	1.72
Others	Others	4,812	3.18
Valid ballots		151,403	98.68
Rejected ballots		2,031	1.32
Turnout		153,434	51.87
Majority		39,345	25.98
PML(N) hold			

=== Result ===
Kulsoom Nawaz won this seat for PML (N), albeit with a much reduced majority of 14,646 due to gains by PTI and small Islamist Parties.

By-election 2017: NA-120 (Lahore-III)
Party	Candidate	Votes	%
PML(N)	Kulsoom Nawaz	61,745	49.35
PTI	Dr. Yasmin Rashid	47,099	37.64
Independent	Shekh Azher Rizvi	7,130	5.70
Independent	Qari Yaqoob Sheikh	5,822	4.65
PPP	Faisal Mir	1,414	1.13
JI	Ziauddin Ansari	592	0.47
Independent	Zubair Ahmed Khan Niazi	534	0.43
Independent	Muhammad Ishfaq Malik	92	0.07
Independent	Mirza Muhammad Ashraf Baig	76	0.06
Independent	Sajida Mir	62	0.05
Independent	Malik Munsif Nawaz	58	0.05
Independent	Qaiser Mehmood	46	0.04
Independent	Tayyap Jamil Khizri	42	0.03
Independent	Muhammad Hadi Shah	38	0.03
Independent	Muhammad Naveed Nawaz	33	0.03
Independent	Inam Ullah Khan	31	0.02
Independent	Sumera Ali	26	0.02
Independent	Ameer Bahadur Khan Hoti	26	0.02
Independent	Nasir Salim	24	0.02
Independent	Aajasam Sharif	22	0.02
Independent	Javid Yousif	19	0.02
Independent	Abdul Rehman Mehmood	17	0.01
Independent	Allama Ghulam Shabir Sial	17	0.01
PFP	Atta Muhammad Kasuri	15	0.01
PML-C	Chaudhry Abid Hussain	15	0.01
Independent	Muhammad Khurram	12	0.01
PPP-SB	Syed Muhammad Shakil Shah Gilani	11	0.01
MOP	Rohi Bano Khokhar	10	0.01
Independent	Sarfraz Qureshi	10	0.01
Independent	Arshad Mehmood Bhatt	10	0.01
Independent	Parvaiz Akhtar Gujjar	8	0.01
Independent	Hafiz Mian Muhammad Nauman	8	0.01
Independent	Sardar Micheal Faris Saroiya	8	0.01
Independent	Syed Muhammad Wasim Shah	8	0.01
Independent	Nadeem Hafeez Khan	7	0.01
Independent	Nawaz Doctor Ambar Shahzada	7	0.01
Independent	Chaudhry Hasnain Gondal	7	0.01
Independent	Irfan Khalid	7	0.01
Independent	Liaquat Abbas Bhatti	5	0.00
Independent	Noor Naeem Khan	5	0.00
Independent	Mian Liaeeq ur Rehman	4	0.00
Independent	Yasir Islam Shaikh	4	0.00
Independent	Hafiz Khalid Waleed	3	0.00
Valid ballots		125,129	98.78
Rejected ballots		1,731	1.22
Majority		14,646	11.71
Turnout		126,860	39.42
PML(N) hold			
