= Adhi Kot =

- Village and union council
- Interactive map of Adhi Kot
- Coordinates: 32°6′13″N 71°48′24″E
- Country: Pakistan
- Region: Punjab Province
- District: Khushab District
- Elevation: 177 m (581 ft)
- Time zone: UTC+5 (PST)

Adhi Kot is a village and one of the 51 Union Councils (administrative subdivisions) of Khushab District in the Punjab Province of Pakistan.

== History ==
The Adhi Kot meteorite landed in the area on 1 May 1919. The meteorite, known as the Adhi Kot stone, fell at 32°16′N 71°49′E at 12PM, 15 miles (24 km) north of station Nurpur, Shahpur District (the area was part of the Shahpur District during British Rule).

Gul Asghar Khan, a member of the National Assembly (MNA) of Pakistan since February 2024, belongs to Adhi Kot.
