= Abu Rumaysah =

British Islamic State militant (born 1983)

- Born: Siddhartha Dhar; 24 June 1983 (age 42); Edmonton, London, England
- Disappeared: 3 January 2016 (aged 32); Raqqa, Syria
- Status: (MIA)
- Other names: "Abu Rumaysah al-Britani" "Jihadi Sid" "Jihadi John" "Saiful Islam"
- Citizenship: British
- Known for: Islamism and being a British executioner in the Islamic State
- Spouse: Aisha Tariq
- Children: 5
- Criminal information
- Criminal status: Designated as a global terrorist by the United States.
- Military career
- Allegiance: Islamic State
- Service years: 2014–?
- Conflicts: Syria: Syrian civil war

Abu Rumaysah al-Britani, born Siddhartha Dhar (24 June 1983) also known as Jihadi Sid, is a British citizen who is an Islamic State (IS) militant. On 3 January 2016, he was named as the lead executioner in a film issued by IS from Raqqa, Syria that showed the execution of suspected British spies against the Islamic State. Rumaysah had been called the second 'Jihadi John', due to his British accent and appearance in the film. Abu Rumaysah has been designated as a global terrorist by the United States.

Dhar was born in London to a Bengali-speaking Hindu family of Indian origin and changed his name to Abu Rumaysah after his conversion to Islam. He acted as a spokesperson for the Islamist group Al-Muhajiroun, an organisation banned in the UK, and worked as an aide to Al-Muhajiroun's co-founder, Anjem Choudary. Dhar also owned a bouncy castle rental company. He lived in Walthamstow. He used social media to promote his Islamist views and attended demonstrations in Britain against the United States, Israel, and Arab governments. In a video he posted to YouTube, Dhar described IS's self declared caliphate as "...a dream for all Muslims worldwide ... We can finally have a sanctuary where we can practice our religion and live under the sharia. It is a big, big thing".

He spoke of his desire for the United Kingdom to be governed under sharia law on the BBC's Sunday Morning Live programme, and said of himself that he didn't "...really identify myself with British values. I am Muslim first, second and last". In 2014, Dhar was under investigation by British authorities for allegedly encouraging terrorism, but subsequently disappeared after being released on bail. Although he had been banned from travelling, Dhar departed for Paris from Victoria Coach Station in London with his wife, Aisha Tariq, and their at the time four children, later arriving at Syria.

Dhar wrote a travel guide to the Islamic State in May 2015, called A Brief Guide to Islamic State, and wrote of it that "If you thought London or New York was cosmopolitan, then wait until you step foot in the Islamic State because it screams diversity. ... In my short time here I have met people from absolutely every walk of life, proof that the caliphate's pulling power is strong and tenacious".

He appeared in the Channel 4 documentary The Jihadis Next Door.

As of 2025, Dhar's current whereabouts are unknown. He is either still missing or presumed dead.
