= Salman Akram Raja =

Pakistani lawyer and politician

- سلمان اکرم راجا

Secretary-General of PTI
- Incumbent
- Assumed office 7 September 2024
- Preceded by: Omar Ayub

Personal details
- Born: Lahore, Punjab, Pakistan
- Party: PTI (2023–present)
- Education: University of Cambridge (BA); Harvard Law School & School of Oriental and African Studies, University of London (LLM)
- Occupation: Lawyer, politician
- Website: www.rmaco.com.pk/salman-akram-raja/ (personal)

Salman Akram Raja (Urdu: سلمان اکرم راجا) is a Pakistani attorney and politician who has provided legal counsel to numerous prominent Pakistani political figures, including past Prime Minister of Pakistan Nawaz Sharif and Imran Khan. He has been serving as the secretary general of PTI since 7 September 2024 and as head of legal affairs for the party since 21 August 2024.

== Early life and education ==
Raja was born to Raja Muhammad Akram, who was a senior advocate of the Supreme Court of Pakistan and a member of the Lahore Bar Association, into a Punjabi Rajput family of the Bangial clan (Panwar Rajputs) with roots in the village of Arazi Hasnal in the Rawalpindi District.

He completed his B.A at University of Cambridge, and earned his LL.M degree from Harvard Law School and the School of Oriental and African Studies at the University of London.

== Legal career ==
Raja has been practising law since 1992 and is an advocate at the Supreme Court of Pakistan. He is widely recognised as a leader in dispute resolution, specialising in corporate, taxation, commercial banking, and competition law. With extensive experience in constitutional and administrative law, he has represented clients in notable cases before the Supreme Court of Pakistan, involving constitutional interpretation.

Raja was part of the legal team that advocated for Nawaz Sharif during the Panama Papers case. Additionally, Raja provided legal representation for Imran Khan in the Nikah during Iddah case, among other legal matters.

He represented the PTI in the Reserved seats case at the Supreme Court of Pakistan, where he argued in favour of granting parliamentary reserved seats to PTI members. The court ruled in favour of PTI's position, which was seen as a significant outcome for the party.

== Academic career ==
Raja has served as a Visiting Lecturer in Company and Commercial Law at the Law School of Lahore University of Management Sciences, Pakistan's leading university, focusing his expertise on Constitutional Law.

== Political career ==
Raja was a candidate for NA-128 Lahore-XII in the 2024 Pakistani general election, running as a PTI-affiliated independent candidate. Independent journalists such as Secunder Kermani expected him to overwhelmingly win the seat, based on voter interviews. However, while Form 45 from the Election Commission of Pakistan showed Raja with a decisive lead, the more final Form 47 reported Aun Chaudhry of Istehkam-e-Pakistan Party as having won 172,576 votes to Raja's 159,024 votes. Raja, PTI supporters, and independent journalists claimed the ECP Form 47 results showed clear evidence of rigging by the Authorities, and the Lahore High Court issued a stay on a final declaration of the results by ECP until a hearing could be fixed to investigate the matter. He was appointed as head of legal affairs for PTI on 21 August 2024, and was later appointed as the secretary general of PTI on 7 September 2024.

== Views ==
=== Human rights and women's rights ===
Raja is recognised for his advocacy for human rights and women's rights in Pakistan. Referring to the 2021 Minar-e-Pakistan mass sexual assault involving a female social media celebrity, he commented that contrary to Pakistan's perceived cultural values of decency, the perpetrators at Minar-e-Pakistan displayed a lack of self-restraint, deviating from societal expectations to protect the victim, or any TikToker. Raja criticised the reactions across various media platforms, which swiftly shifted blame onto the victim, labelling her as an attention-seeking conspirator against Pakistan. He noted how a superficial examination of approved Pakistani textbooks under the Single National Curriculum since 2020 reflects a normative portrayal of girls and women in hijab or purdah, who abstain from activities like music and singing, as the idealised standard of a 'good woman/child', a standard the assaulted woman failed to meet. This portrayal contrasts with Raja's own upbringing and the freedoms he wants for his daughters, who are musicians.

== Writings ==
Raja has written articles and op-eds for English-language newspapers such as Dawn News and The News International.

His academic publications include:

- 'Islamisation of Laws in Pakistan,' South Asian Journal, vol. 1, no. 2, October–December 2003, pp. 94–109.
