= Waheed Alam Khan =

Pakistani politician

- وحیدعالم خان

Member of the National Assembly of Pakistan
- In office 13 August 2018 – 10 August 2023
- Constituency: NA-125 (Lahore-III)
- In office 1 June 2013 – 31 May 2018
- Constituency: NA-127 (Lahore-X)

Personal details
- Born: 1 April 1949 (age 77)
- Other political affiliations: PMLN (2018–2023)

Waheed Alam Khan (Urdu: وحید عالم خان; born 1 April 1949) is a Pakistani politician who had been a member of the National Assembly of Pakistan, from August 2018 till August 2023. Previously he was a member of the National Assembly from June 2013 to May 2018.

== Early life ==
He was born on 1 April 1949.

== Political career ==
Khan served as the Nazim of UC-72 (Anarkali) before getting elected to the National Assembly of Pakistan as a candidate of Pakistan Muslim League (N) (PML-N) from Constituency NA-127 (Lahore-X) in the 2013 Pakistani general election.

He was re-elected to the National Assembly as a candidate of PML-N from Constituency NA-125 (Lahore-III) in the 2018 Pakistani general election.
