= Kulsoom Nawaz =

Pakistani politician (1948–2018)

Begum Kulsoom Nawaz
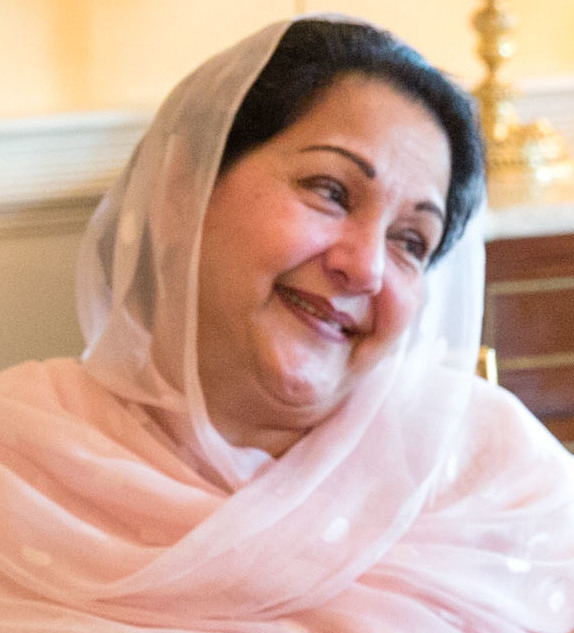
- Nawaz at the White House in 2013

Member of the National Assembly
- In office 2017 – 31 May 2018
- Preceded by: Nawaz Sharif
- Succeeded by: Waheed Alam Khan
- Constituency: NA-130 Lahore-XIV

President of Pakistan Muslim League (N)
- In office 12 October 1999 – 10 October 2002
- Preceded by: Nawaz Sharif
- Succeeded by: Javed Hashmi

Personal details
- Born: Kulsoom Rehana Butt; 29 March 1948 Lahore, Pakistan
- Died: 11 September 2018 (aged 70) London, England
- Party: Pakistan Muslim League (N)
- Spouse: Nawaz Sharif (m. 1970)
- Children: 4, including Maryam Nawaz
- Relatives: Sharif family
- Education: Islamia College Lahore; Forman Christian College

Begum Kulsoom Nawaz Sharif (Punjabi, Urdu: كلثوم نواز; née Butt; 29 March 1948 – 11 September 2018) was a Pakistani politician and the wife of three-time Prime Minister Nawaz Sharif. She served as First Lady of Pakistan during each of his three tenures and was the President of Pakistan Muslim League (N) from 1999 to 2002.

== Early and personal life ==
Kulsoom Nawaz was born on 29 March 1948 in Lahore into a Punjabi Kashmiri family to Mohammed Hafiz Butt. Her father was a doctor who ran his own clinic. According to other sources, she was born on 22 March 1948. She attended Islamia College and graduated from the Forman Christian College in Lahore. She received a master's degree in Urdu from the University of the Punjab in 1970.

As a student, she was known for her left-leaning politics, being an admirer of Zulfikar Ali Bhutto. Her thesis, Study of Cultural Awareness in Rajab Ali Baig Saroor’s Era, was published in book form in 1985.

Kulsoom had two sisters and a brother. From her maternal side, she was the maternal granddaughter of the wrestler The Great Gama (born Ghulam Mohammad Baksh Butt).

Kulsoom married Nawaz Sharif, the three-time Prime Minister of Pakistan, in April 1970. The couple have four children: Maryam, Asma, Hassan and Hussain.

== Political career ==
=== First Lady of Pakistan ===
Kulsoom became the first lady of Pakistan for the first time after her husband, Nawaz Sharif, became Prime Minister of Pakistan on 1 November 1990 when his party, Islami Jamhoori Ittehad, won 104 of 207 seats contested in the 1990 Pakistani general election. His first term as prime minister ended in July 1993.

She became first lady of Pakistan for the second time after Nawaz Sharif became Prime Minister of Pakistan when his party, Pakistan Muslim League (N), won the 1997 Pakistani general election. His second term as prime minister was ended when then Chief of Army Staff General Pervez Musharraf led a military coup d'état against him on 12 October 1999. Kulsoom was arrested by the Pakistan Army Corps of Military Police and immediately shifted to her local residence. According to her daughter, Maryam Nawaz, Kulsoom "dauntlessly challenged the usurper when a lot of men backed out". Nawaz Sharif named his wife as the President of Pakistan Muslim League in 1999.

In 2000, she led a public rally from Lahore to Peshawar to gather the public support for the PML-N. Soon after leaving her residence, her car was surrounded by the police and she was detained.

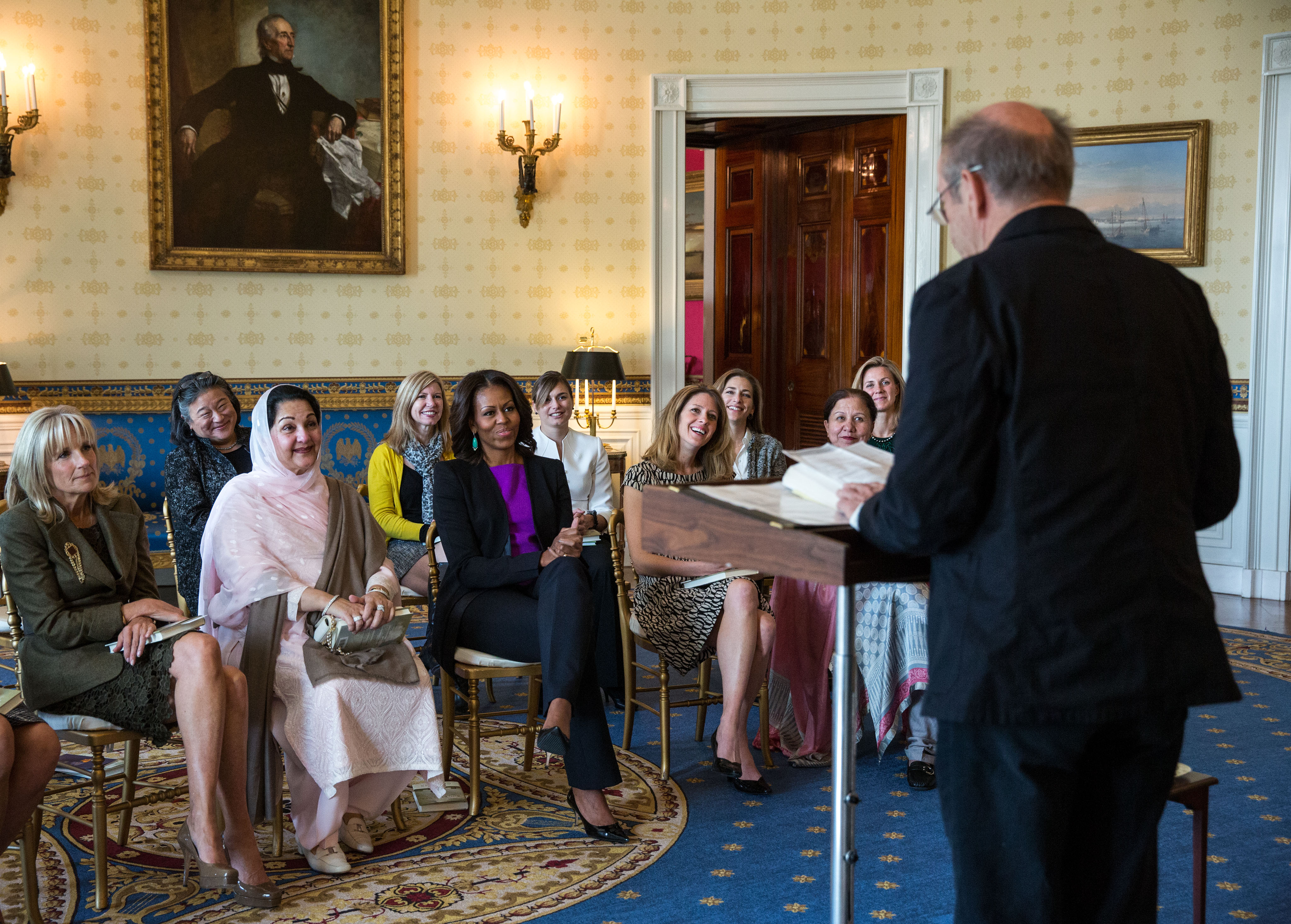
First Lady Michelle Obama and Jill Biden host a poetry recital in the honour of Kulsoom Nawaz Sharif on 23 October 2013

She remained president of the PML-N until 2002. She became the first lady of Pakistan for the third time after Nawaz Sharif became Prime Minister of Pakistan when his party, Pakistan Muslim League (N), won the 2013 Pakistani general election.

=== Electoral politics ===
Kulsoom was elected to the National Assembly of Pakistan for the first time from NA-120 (Lahore-III) as a candidate of PML (N) in by-polls held in September 2017. She secured 59,413 votes and defeated Yasmin Rashid of Pakistan Tehreek-e-Insaf. The NA-120 seat fell vacant after her husband, Nawaz Sharif, was disqualified by the Supreme Court of Pakistan in the Panama Papers case.

She was unable to take oath as member of the National Assembly due to her illness. She was known for maintaining a low profile.

== Death and funeral ==
Nawaz was diagnosed with lymphoma in August 2017 and received treatment in London. She underwent several sessions of chemotherapy and radiotherapy during her illness.

In June 2018, Nawaz suffered cardiac arrest and was placed on a ventilator. On 10 September 2018, she was again hospitalised, and died on 11 September 2018 at the age of 70 in London while both her husband and daughter Maryam were serving jail terms in Pakistan; they were granted timed-parole to attend her funeral. On 13 September 2018, a funeral prayer for Nawaz was held in London Central Mosque, after which her body was flown to Lahore. On 14 September 2018, in Lahore, a funeral prayer led by Maulana Tariq Jameel was offered at Sharif Medical City, and she was buried in Jati Umra.

== Books ==
- Study of Cultural Awareness in Rajab Ali Baig Saroor’s Era, Sang-e-Meel, 1985.
- Jabar Aur Jamhuriat [Repression and Democracy], Sagar Publisher, 2007.

Party political offices
Preceded by Nawaz Sharif	Leader of the Pakistan Muslim League (N); 1999–2002	Succeeded by Javed Hashmi
