= Sumaira Malik =

Pakistani politician

- سمیرا ملک

Member of the National Assembly of Pakistan
- In office 2002 – October 2013
- Constituency: NA-69 (Khushab-I)

Personal details
- Born: 19 December 1963 (age 62)

Sumaira Malik (Urdu: سمیرا ملک; born 19 December 1963) is a Pakistani politician who had been a member of the National Assembly of Pakistan from 2002 to October 2013.

== Early life and education ==
She was born on 19 December 1963.

She has done Master of Arts in Political Science from the University of the Punjab.

== Political career ==
Malik was elected to the National Assembly of Pakistan from Constituency NA-69 (Khushab-I) as a candidate of National Alliance in the 2002 Pakistani general election. She received 71,925 votes and defeated Umer Aslam Awan, a candidate of Pakistan Muslim League (Q) (PML-Q). In September 2004, she was inducted into the federal cabinet of Prime Minister Shaukat Aziz and was appointed as Minister of State for Tourism.

She was re-elected to the National Assembly from Constituency NA-69 (Khushab-I) as a candidate of PML-Q in the 2008 Pakistani general election. She received 61,076 votes and defeated an independent candidate, Umer Aslam Awan.

She was re-elected to the National Assembly from Constituency NA-69 (Khushab-I) as a candidate of Pakistan Muslim League (N) in the 2013 Pakistani general election. She received 119,193 votes and defeated Umer Aslam Awan, a candidate of Pakistan Tehreek-e-Insaf.

She was disqualified from the National Assembly by the Supreme Court of Pakistan due to fake degree in October 2013.

She once served as the Minister of Women Development and Minister of State for Youth Affairs.

In May 2018, the Supreme Court of Pakistan declared election of Malik as chairperson of the Khushab district council as null and void.

In June 2018, SC allowed her to contest 2018 Pakistani general election overturning previous decision over the fake degree.

In July 2018 she lost the election to Umer Aslam Awan, a candidate of Pakistan Tehreek-e-Insaf.
