= Malik Ehsan Ullah Tiwana =

Malik Muhammad Ehsanullah Tiwana

Member of the National Assembly of Pakistan
- In office 13 August 2018 – 25 January 2023
- Constituency: NA-94 (Khushab-II)

Personal details
- Party: IPP (2023-present)
- Other political affiliations: PTI (2010-2023)

Malik Muhammad Ehsanullah Tiwana is a Pakistani politician who was a Member of the National Assembly of Pakistan from August 2018 till January 2023.

== Political career ==
He was elected to the National Assembly of Pakistan from Constituency NA-94 (Khushab-II) as a candidate of Pakistan Tehreek-e-Insaf in the 2018 Pakistani general election.

In January 2023, the Election Commission of Pakistan (ECP) de-notified him as a member of the National Assembly after he resigned following Imran Khan's ousting as the Prime Minister through a no-confidence motion.
