= Awn Chawdhary =

Pakistani politician (born 1970)

- عون چوہدری
- Chawdhary in 2026

Advisor to the Prime Minister on Tourism and Sports
- In office 19 April 2022 – 10 August 2023
- President: Arif Alvi
- Prime Minister: Shehbaz Sharif

Additional Secretary-General of the IPP
- Incumbent
- Assumed office 12 June 2023
- President: Aleem Khan

Member of the National Assembly of Pakistan
- Incumbent
- Assumed office 29 February 2024
- Constituency: NA-128 Lahore-XII

Special Coordinator to the Chief Minister of Punjab on Political Affairs
- In office 15 December 2020 – 6 August 2021
- Governor: Chaudhry Sarwar
- Chief Minister: Usman Buzdar

Advisor to the Chief Minister of Punjab
- In office 11 September 2018 – 15 December 2020
- Governor: Chaudhry Sarwar
- Chief Minister: Usman Buzdar

Personal details
- Born: Muhammad Awn Saqlain Chawdhary; 10 April 1970 (age 56) Lahore, Punjab, Pakistan
- Party: IPP (2023–present)
- Other political affiliations: PMLN (2021-2023); PTI (2013–2021)
- Spouse: Noor Bukhari
- Relations: Muhammad Amin Zulqernain (brother)

Muhammad Awn Saqlain Chawdhary (Note: Urdu: محمد عون ثقلین چوہدری) (born 10 April 1970) is a Pakistani politician who has been a member of the National Assembly of Pakistan since 2024. He also serves as the additional secretary general of the Istehkam-e-Pakistan Party (IPP).

Chaudhry also an advisor to the Prime Minister of Pakistan Shehbaz Sharif on tourism and sports from April 2022 to August 2023.

== Political career ==
He previously served as Chief Coordinator to the Chief Minister of Punjab, Usman Buzdar, from December 2020 to August 2021.

He is the brother of dissident PTI MPA Amin Chaudhry, who voted for Hamza Shehbaz in the 2022 Chief Minister of Punjab Elections. In 2018, soon after the general elections, Aun was appointed as Advisor to Chief Minister Punjab, in which position he served until 2020.

He was asked to resign from the Punjab Cabinet after the sugar scandal cases against Jahangir Tareen; however, the Punjab government denied receiving his resignation.

Later he was dismissed from his office. Imran Khan expelled him from PTI in July 2021 on advice of his wife Bushra Bibi.

He was a candidate for NA-128 Lahore-XII in the 2024 Pakistani general election, running as a member of Istehkam-e-Pakistan Party (IPP). Independent journalists such as Secunder Kermani expected the seat to be overwhelmingly won by the PTI-affiliated candidate Salman Akram Raja, on the basis of voter interviews. However, while Form 45 from the Election Commission of Pakistan showed Raja with a decisive lead, the final Form 47 reported Chaudhry as having won 172,576 votes to Raja's 159,024 votes. Raja, PTI supporters, and independent journalists claimed the ECP Form 47 results showed clear evidence of rigging by the Army, and the Lahore High Court issued a stay on a final declaration of the results by ECP until a hearing could be fixed to investigate the matter.

== Personal life ==
He married former actress Noor Bukhari in 2012 and ended their relationship after a few months. They eventually remarried in 2020 after getting a Halala.
