= Omar Hussain =

- Born: 21 March 1987; High Wycombe, Buckinghamshire, United Kingdom
- Died: c. August 2017 (aged 30); Raqqa, Syria
- Other name: Abu Sa'eed al-Britani
- Years active: 2013–2017

Omar Ali Hussain (21 March 1987 - c. 2017), also known under the nom de guerre Abu Sa'eed al-Britani, was a British Islamic militant and member of the Islamic State.

== Early life ==
Hussain was born in High Wycombe, Buckinghamshire. He attended Cressex Community School in High Wycombe, and was employed as a security guard in the High Wycombe branch of supermarket chain Morrisons.

Hussain was placed on the Sex Offenders' Register when he was convicted of indecent assault after groping a woman's breasts when he was 21.

Hussain tried to leave Britain for Pakistan in 2010 but was stopped by police on suspicion that he planned to head to Afghanistan.

== Syria ==
In December 2013, Hussain went to the police station in the town of High Wycombe and told officers that he intended to travel to Syria from Turkey with an aid convoy. He later boarded a flight to Turkey from Gatwick Airport, where he was stopped by detectives. However, he told them he was going to distribute aid to Syrian children, and was allowed to continue his journey. In a November 2015 interview with BBC Newsnight, he said travelled successfully "by blagging it the whole way through".

On the 3 October 2014, he appeared in an IS video message called Message of the Mujahid.

=== US and UN sanctions ===
The United States Department of the Treasury describes Hussain as "of September 2015, one of ISIL’s most prominent recruiters". According to the US treasury, as an IS fighter, he offered tips on evading British security to individuals interested in leaving the United Kingdom to fight with IS.

On 28 September 2015, he was sanctioned by the United Nations Security Council Al-Qaida Sanctions Committee and made subject to an INTERPOL-UN Security Council Special Notice.

The UN narrative summary describes him thus, "In January 2014, Omar Ali Hussain travelled to the Syrian Arab Republic to fight for Islamic State in Iraq and the Levant (ISIL), listed as Al-Qaida in Iraq (QDe.115), and has since demonstrated an active online presence on extremist websites and social media. Hussain uses this online presence to recruit individuals for combat and for operational roles in ISIL "

=== Tabloid controversies ===
Hussain has attracted a considerable level of coverage from British tabloid newspapers.

=== IS censorship ===
Hussain has been censured by IS media operatives for his open online social media presence, which is banned by the group.

== Possible death ==
Hussain's nom de guerre, Abu Sa'eed al-Britani, was found etched on the wall of a cell in the IS prison underneath the stadium at Raqqa. 49 tally marks were found underneath his name, indicating that he spent 49 days in the jail. Although it was reported that most captives of the prison did not survive their detention, the date beneath Hussain's name is 24 February 2016 - more than a full year prior to his actual disappearance and last activity on social media. Abu Sa'eed spent approximately two months in ISIS dungeons at that time, but made it out and participated in the Battle of Raqqa.

On 18 August 2019 it was reported by some British newspapers, citing "security sources", that Hussain had died in an Islamic State suicide attack during the Battle of Raqqa.
