= Secunder Kermani =

British journalist

Secunder Kermani is a British journalist who is foreign correspondent for Channel 4 News. Kermani is a former BBC correspondent in Pakistan and Afghanistan. He was previously a reporter on the BBC's flagship current affairs programme Newsnight.

== Education ==
Secunder Kermani was born in London to British Asian parents. He is the son of the film director Faris Kermani. Kermani attended Dulwich College and then graduated with a first class honours degree in history and Spanish from the University of Manchester, and a masters in TV journalism from Goldsmiths, University of London.

== Career ==
Kermani has played a prominent role covering the Israel-Gaza conflict for Channel 4 News, receiving awards for his coverage from the Royal Television Society, Bafta and Emmy.

At the BBC, Kermani led coverage of the Taliban's rise to power in Afghanistan in 2021, filming with the insurgents as they fought Afghan government and western forces, and also reporting on the Fall of Kabul and the Taliban's first year as rulers of the country.

Kermani began reporting for the BBC's Newsnight programme in 2014. Many of his reports focused on the growth of the militant group the Islamic State in Iraq and Syria (ISIS), and Western recruits to the organisation. He secured a number of exclusive interviews with members of ISIS including British jihadist Omar Hussain, and Australian suicide bomber Jake Bilardi, as well as with relatives of other ISIS fighters.

In October 2016, it was reported that police from the Thames Valley Police counter-terrorism department had obtained a court order allowing them to seize Kermani's laptop to view messages between him and a member of ISIS he had interviewed. The case attracted criticism from press freedom campaigners. Editor of Newsnight Ian Katz said he was "concerned that the use of the Terrorism Act to obtain communication between journalists and sources will make it very difficult for reporters to cover this issue of critical public interest."

In February 2018 Kermani was appointed the BBC's correspondent in Pakistan and Afghanistan. He has interviewed Nobel Peace Prize winner Malala Yousafzai, former prime ministers of Pakistan Nawaz Sharif and Imran Khan.

Kermani has also been a reporter on an episode of the BBC's flagship documentary strand Panorama, and been a presenter on the BBC Asian Network radio station.

In 2022, Kermani became the foreign correspondent for Channel 4 News. He is one the few journalists to have reported from inside rebel-held territory in Myanmar, and has covered the conflict in the Middle East extensively. Since joining Channel 4 News, he has covered stories in areas including Brazil, Israel and the Palestinian Territories, and Japan.

== Awards ==
- 2016 New York Radio Awards (Gold, Best Documentary, Gold, Best Investigative report) – "ISIS: Young, British and Radicalised” for BBC Radio 1.
- 2016 Association for International Broadcasting (Radio Current Affairs, Winner) – "ISIS: Young, British and Radicalised” for BBC Radio 1.
- 2018 Human Rights Press Awards (Television & Video, Winner) – BBC "Our World" documentary: “Murder on Campus” investigating the lynching of Pakistani student Mashal Khan who was accused by classmates of having committed blasphemy.
- 2021 nominee for a Peabody Award as a part of the writing and reporter team for the Afghanistan: Documenting A Crucial Year.
- 2024 Royal Television Society, Network Television Journalist of the Year
- 2024 BAFTA, "News Coverage" as part of the Channel 4 News team's award for coverage of the Israel-Gaza conflict
- 2024 Emmy, "International Emmy for News" as part of the Channel 4 News team's award for coverage of the Israel-Gaza conflict
- 2025 BAFTA, "News Coverage" as part of the Channel 4 News team's award for coverage of the Israel-Iran conflict – "Israel-Iran: The Twelve Day War"
