= NA-130 Lahore-XIV =

Constituency of the National Assembly of Pakistan

- Constituency for the National Assembly of Pakistan
- Region: Lahore City area of Lahore District
- Electorate: 608,318

Current constituency
- Created: 2018
- Number of members: 1
- Party: Pakistan Muslim League (N)
- Member: Mian Muhammad Nawaz Sharif
- Created from: NA-120 Lahore-III
- Replaced by: NA-130 Lahore-XIV

NA-130 Lahore-XIV (این اے-130, لاہور-14) is a constituency for the National Assembly of Pakistan.

== Members of Parliament ==
=== 1990-2002: NA-95 Lahore-III ===
Election	Member	Party
1988	Nawaz Sharif	IJI
1990	Nawaz Sharif	PML-N
1993	Nawaz Sharif	PML-N
1997	Nawaz Sharif	PML-N

=== 2002–2018: NA-120 Lahore-III ===
Election	Member	Party
2002	Muhammad Pervaiz Malik	PML-N
2008	Bilal Yaseen	PML-N
2013	Nawaz Sharif	PML-N
2017	Kulsoom Nawaz	PML-N

=== 2018–2023: NA-125 Lahore-III ===
Election	Member	Party
2018	Waheed Alam Khan	PML-N

=== 2024–present: NA-130 Lahore-XIV ===
Election	Member	Party
2024	Nawaz Sharif	PMLN

== Election 2002 ==
General Elections were held on 10 October 2002. Muhammed Pervaiz Malik won this seat with 33,741 votes.

General Election 2002: NA-120 Lahore-III
Party	Candidate	Votes	%
PML(N)	Muhammed Pervaiz Malik	33,741	46.87
PPP	Altaf Ahmed Qureshi	19,483	27.06
PML(Q)	Mian Mohammad Ashraf	15,085	20.96
Others	Others	3,678	5.12
Valid ballots		71,987	98.88
Rejected ballots		819	1.12
Turnout		72,806	31.27
Majority		14,258	19.81
PML(N) hold			

== Election 2008 ==
General Elections were held on 18 February 2008. Bilal Yaseen won this seat with 65,946 votes.

General Election 2008: NA-120 (Lahore-III
Party	Candidate	Votes	%
PML(N)	Bilal Yaseen	65,946	68.50
PPP	Jahangir Badar	24,380	25.32
PML(Q)	Khawaja Tahir Zia	4,270	4.43
Others	Others	1,679	1.74
Valid ballots		96,275	98.81
Rejected ballots		1,160	1.19
Turnout		97,435	36.28
Majority		41,596	43.18
PML(N) hold			

== Election 2013 ==
General elections were held on 11 May 2013. Nawaz Sharif won this seat with 91,666 votes.

General Election 2013: NA-120 Lahore-III
Party	Candidate	Votes	%
PML(N)	Nawaz Sharif	91,666	60.54
PTI	Yasmin Rashid	52,321	34.56
PPP	Zubair Kardar	2,604	1.72
Others	Others	4,812	3.18
Valid ballots		151,403	98.68
Rejected ballots		2,031	1.32
Turnout		153,434	51.87
Majority		39,345	25.98
PML(N) hold			

== By-election 2017 ==
Following the decision given by the Supreme Court of Pakistan to disqualify Prime Minister Nawaz Sharif from public office, a bye-election was triggered in his NA-120 constituency. The by-election took place on 17 September 2017. Kulsoom Nawaz won this seat with 61,745 votes.

Detailed results can be found here.

By-election 2017: NA-120 Lahore-III
Party	Candidate	Votes	%
PML(N)	Kulsoom Nawaz	61,745	49.35
PTI	Dr. Yasmin Rashid	47,099	37.64
Independent	Shekh Azher Rizvi	7,130	5.70
Others	Others	9,155	7.32
Valid ballots		125,129	98.78
Rejected ballots		1,731	1.22
Turnout		126,860	39.42
Majority		14,646	11.71
PML(N) hold			

== Election 2018 ==
General elections were held on 25 July 2018.

General election 2018: NA-125 Lahore-III
Party	Candidate	Votes	%	±%
PML(N)	Waheed Alam Khan	122,327	48.88	▼0.47
PTI	Yasmin Rashid	105,857	42.30	▲4.66
Others	Others (eleven candidates)	22,070	8.82	
Turnout		254,348	52.38	▲12.96
Total valid votes		250,254	98.39	▼0.39
Rejected ballots		4,094	1.61	▲0.39
Majority		16,470	6.58	▼5.13
Registered electors		485,624		
PML(N) hold		Swing	▼2.57	

== Election 2024 ==
General elections were held on 8 February 2024. Nawaz Sharif won the election with 179,312 votes.

General election 2024: NA-130 Lahore-XIV
Party	Candidate	Votes	%	±%
PML(N)	Mian Muhammad Nawaz Sharif	179,310	59	▲1.46
PTI	Yasmin Rashid (Note: Filed nomination papers as PTI candidate but ECP allowed her to run as an independent)	104485	34	▼0.99
Others	Others (sixteen candidates)	31,914	7	
Turnout		319,054	52.45	▲0.07
Total valid votes		315,717	98.95	
Rejected ballots		3,337	1.05	
Majority		74,821	23.70	▲17.12
Registered electors		608,318		
PML(N) hold		Swing	N/A	

== See also ==
- NA-129 Lahore-XIII
- NA-131 Kasur-I
