= Umer Aslam Awan =

Pakistani politician

Member of the National Assembly of Pakistan
- In office 13 August 2018 – 20 January 2023
- Constituency: NA-93 (Khushab-I)

Personal details
- Born: Khushab, Punjab, Pakistan
- Party: PTI (2018-present)
- Relations: Hasan Aslam Awan (brother)

Umer Aslam Awan (Urdu: عمر اسلم اعوان) is a Pakistani politician who had been a member of the National Assembly of Pakistan from August 2018 till January 2023.

== Political career ==
Malik Umer Aslam Awan succeeded maternal uncle Malik Naeem Khan and became MNA From Constituency NA69 in February 1997 but lost in series 2002, 2008, 2013 and by-election 2013 versus Sumaira Malik before winning again in 2018 elections. He was re-elected to the National Assembly of Pakistan from Constituency NA-93 (Khushab-I) as a candidate of Pakistan Tehreek-e-Insaf in the 2018 Pakistani general election.

== More Reading ==
- List of members of the 15th National Assembly of Pakistan
