= Istehkam-e-Pakistan Party =

Political party in Pakistan

Istehkam-e-Pakistan Party استحکامِ پاکستان پارٹی Pakistan Stability Party
- Abbreviation: IPP
- Leader: Aleem Khan
- Chief Whip: Gul Asghar Khan
- Additional Secretary-General: Awn Chawdhary
- Founders: Aleem Khan; Jahangir Tareen
- Founded: June 8, 2023; 3 years ago
- Split from: PTI
- Headquarters: Lahore, Punjab
- Student wing: Istehkam Student Federation
- Youth wing: Istehkam Youth Wing
- Women's wing: Istehkam Women Wing
- Volunteer Wing: Istehkam Volunteer Wing
- Lawyers Wing: Istehkam Lawyers Forum
- Teachers Wing: Istehkam Teachers Wing
- Doctors Wing: Istehkam Doctors Forum
- Membership: 400 (2026)
- Ideology: Populism
- National affiliation: PDM
- Colors
- Slogan: Ta'meer, Taraqqi, Khushhali (lit. 'Development, Progress, Prosperity')
- National Assembly of Pakistan: 4 / 336
- Provincial Assembly of Punjab: 11 / 371
- Provincial Assembly of Sindh: 0 / 168
- Provincial Assembly of Khyber Pakhtunkhwa: 0 / 145
- Senate of Pakistan: 0 / 96
- Azad Kashmir Legislative Assembly: 2 / 53
- Gilgit-Baltistan Assembly: 7 / 33
- Provincial Assembly of Balochistan: 0 / 65

Election symbol
- Eagle

Party flag
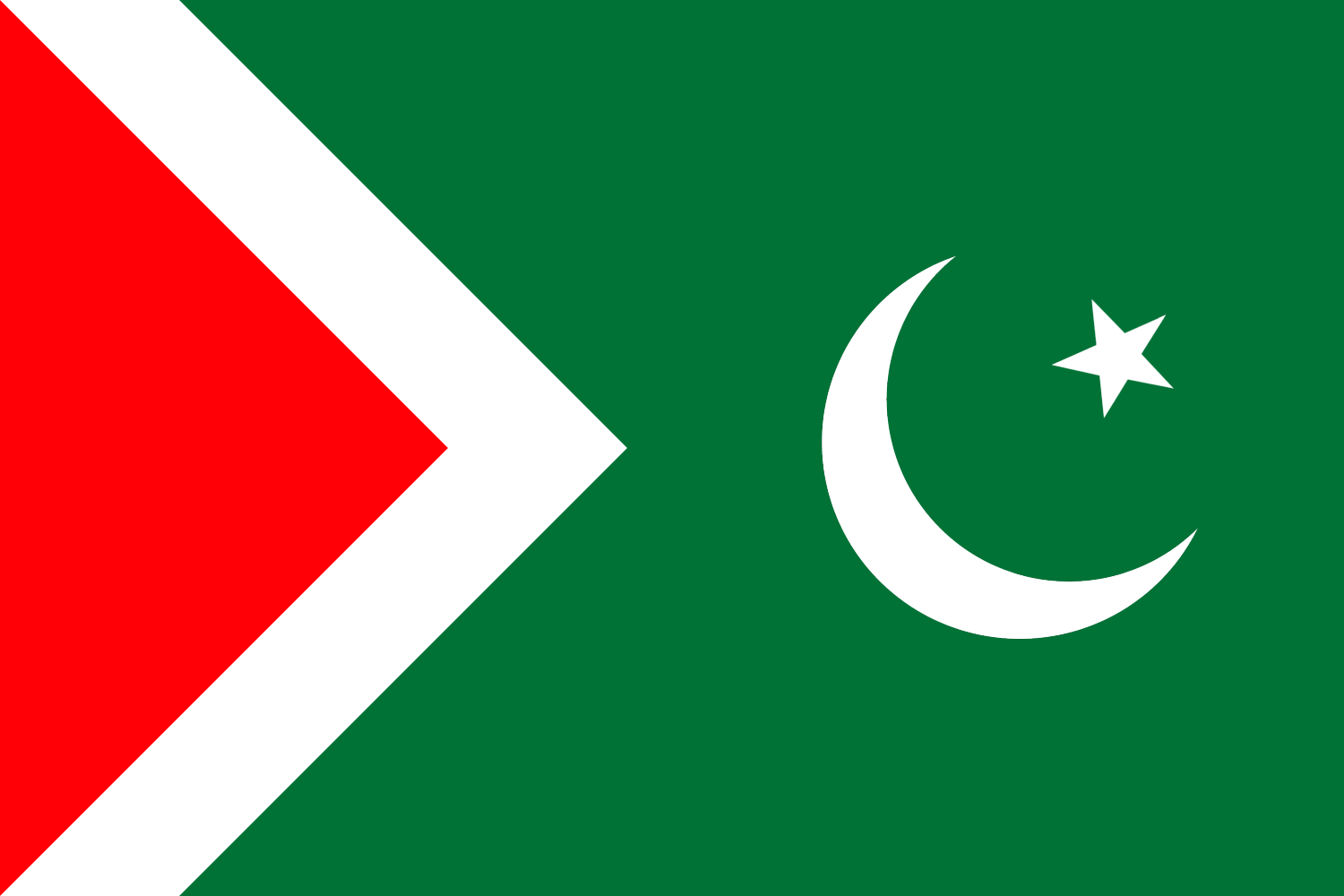

Website
- www.istehkam.org

The Istehkam-e-Pakistan Party (IPP) (Note: Urdu: استحکامِ پاکستان پارٹی, lit. 'Pakistan Stability Party') is a Pakistani political party. It was founded by Aleem Khan and Jahangir Tareen on 8 June 2023. It was registered with the Election Commission of Pakistan (ECP) on 5 October 2023.

The IPP emerged as the sixth-largest party in the 2024 general election, winning three seats in the National Assembly. It is also the third-largest party in the Gilgit-Baltistan Assembly, winning 7 seats in the 2026 Gilgit-Baltistan Assembly election.

== History ==
Around one hundred leaders from all around Pakistan attended a dinner organized by Aleem Khan and Jahangir Tareen, where it the foundation of the IPP was announced. The party's first leader, Jahangir Tareen, spoke about his goals on the occasion, to "fulfill the teachings of Muhammad Ali Jinnah, Fatima Jinnah, Allama Iqbal", ending political and social divisions, and bringing political and economic reforms.

On 18 July 2023, the IPP submitted an application for party registration with the Election Commission of Pakistan (ECP). For the party's electoral symbol, they sought an eagle.

On 5 October 2023, the ECP accepted the application and issued a notification of the IPP's registration. On 26 October, the party was allotted the eagle as their electoral symbol.

=== 2024 election ===
Three candidates of IPP, Aleem Khan, Gul Asghar Khan and Awn Chawdhary, won their respective seats in the National Assembly through the 2024 general election. On 12 February 2024, Jahangir Tareen resigned from the party after losing in the election. Aleem Khan subsequently succeeded him as president and Gul Asghar Khan was appointed the party's chief whip and party president in North Punjab.

== Organization ==
On 12 June 2023, Tareen had announced Aleem Khan as the first President of the IPP, Aamir Mehmood Kiani as the first Secretary-General, and Awn Chawdhary as the Additional Secretary-General and Spokesperson. Due to Tareen's disqualification by the courts, he is unable to hold any official post in the IPP, but he has been regarded as the "patron-in-chief" of the party.

Office	Incumbent
Leader	Aleem Khan
Secretary-General	Mian Khalid Mehmood
Additional Secretary-General	Awn Chawdhary
Spokesperson	Awn Chawdhary
Chief Whip and President of North Punjab	Gul Asghar Khan
President of Sindh Chapter	Wahid Ali Khan

=== Leadership in Punjab ===
On 12 August 2023, Aamir Mehmood Kiani, the party's Secretary-General announced the heads of divisional organizations across the province of Punjab.

Division	President	General Secretary
Lahore Division	Murad Raas	Mian Khalid Mehmood
Faisalabad Division	Muhammad Waris Aziz	Mian Kashif Ashfaq
Gujranwala Division	Rana Umar Nazir Khan	Mamoon Jaffar Tarar
Sahiwal Division	Nouraiz Shakoor	Dewan Akhlaq
Bahawalpur Division	Makhdoom Syed Iftikhar Hassan Gillani	Tehseen Gardezi
Sargodha Division	Chaudhry Faisal Farooq Cheema	Ameer Haider Sangha

== Ideology ==
The IPP has advocated for the establishment of an "Islamic society".
