= 2018 Pakistani general election =

- 25 July 2018

All 342 seats in the National Assembly 172 seats needed for a majority
- Turnout: 51.7% (▼3.3pp)
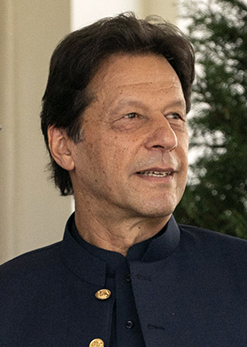

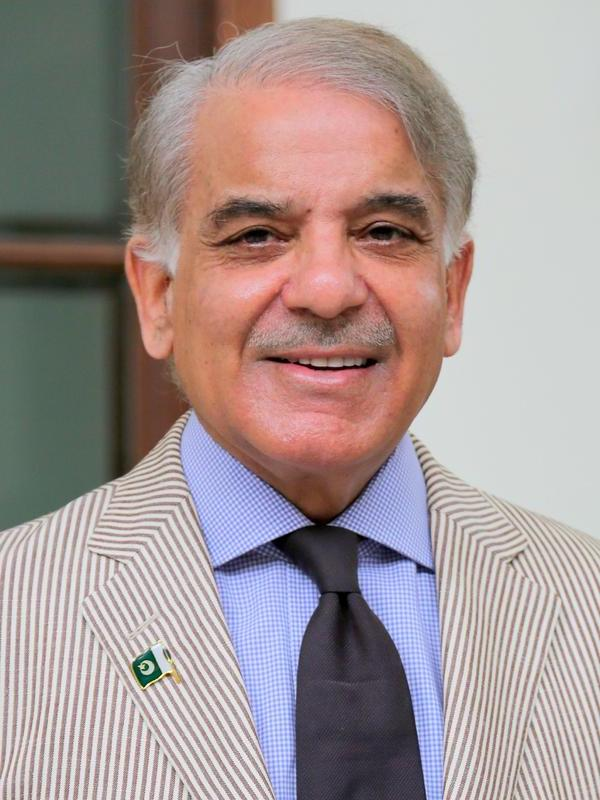

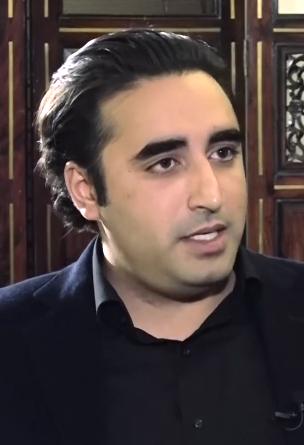
	First party	Second party	Third party
Leader	Imran Khan	Shehbaz Sharif	Bilawal Bhutto Zardari
Party	PTI	PML(N)	PPP
Leader's seat	Mianwali-I	Lahore-X	Larkana-I
Last election	16.92%, 35 seats	32.77%, 166 seats	15.23%, 42 seats
Seats won	149	82	54
Seat change	▲114	▼84	▲12
Popular vote	16,903,702	12,934,589	6,924,356
Percentage	31.82%	24.35%	13.03%
Swing	▲14.90pp	▼8.42pp	▼2.29pp
- Results by constituency
Prime Minister before election
Shahid Khaqan Abbasi
PML(N)
Subsequent Prime Minister
Imran Khan
PTI

General elections were held in Pakistan on 25 July 2018 to elect the members of the 15th National Assembly and the four Provincial Assemblies. The three major parties were Pakistan Tehreek-e-Insaf (PTI), led by Imran Khan, the Pakistan Muslim League, led by Shehbaz Sharif, and the Pakistan People's Party, led by Bilawal Bhutto. The PTI won the most seats in the National Assembly but fell short of a majority; the party subsequently formed a coalition government with several smaller parties. At the provincial level, the PTI remained the largest party in Khyber Pakhtunkhwa (KP); the Pakistan Peoples Party (PPP) retained its dominance in Sindh; and the newly formed Balochistan Awami Party (BAP) emerged as the largest party in Balochistan. In Punjab, the result was a hung parliament, with the Pakistan Muslim League (N) (PML(N)) winning the most seats. However, after several independent MPAs joined the PTI, the latter became the largest party and was able to form a government.

Opinion polling prior to the campaigns starting had initially shown leads for the Pakistan Muslim League (N) (PML(N)) over the PTI. However, from an 11-point lead, the PML(N)'s lead began to diminish in the final weeks of the campaign, with some polls close to the election showing the PTI with a marginal but increasing lead. In the lead-up to the elections, there were rumours about pre-poll rigging being conducted by the judiciary, the military and the intelligence agencies to sway the election results in favour of the PTI and against the PML(N). However, Reuters polling suggested PML(N)'s lead had genuinely narrowed in the run-up to the elections, and that the party had suffered "blow after blow" which caused setbacks to any hopes of re-election.

Election day saw the PTI receive 32% of the vote (its highest share of the vote since its foundation), while the PML(N) received 24%. Following the elections, six major parties including PML(N) claimed there had been large-scale vote rigging and administrative malpractices. Imran Khan, chairman of the PTI, proceeded to form a coalition government, announcing his cabinet shortly after the elections. The newly formed coalition government included members of the Muttahida Qaumi Movement and Pakistan Muslim League (Q).

Regarding the voting process, the Election Commission of Pakistan (ECP) outrightly rejected reports of rigging and stated that the elections had been fair and free. A top electoral watchdog, Free and Fair Election Network (FAFEN), also said that the 2018 general elections in Pakistan had been "more transparent in some aspects" than the previous polls. In its preliminary report, the European Union Election Observation Mission said that no rigging had been observed during the election day in general, but found a "lack of equality" and criticized the process more than it had in the Pakistani election of 2013.

This was also the third consecutive election from Pakistan's most recent transition to democracy where a democratic handover of power was observed. The day after the election, despite reservations over the result, PML(N) conceded defeat. Pakistan's election commission reiterated its position, rejecting reports of rigging. The voter turnout dropped from 55.0% in 2013 to 51.7%.

Although the election commission rejected rigging allegations, there were claims that Khan was able to lure more electable candidates to his party than PML(N), which led to suggestions that there was electoral inequality. However, the newly minted opposition decided against boycotting parliament, lending legitimacy to the electoral process by parliamentary participation. Initially a recount was ordered in 14 constituencies because of procedural errors. Moreover, procedural errors then led to a recount on 70 constituencies by the election commission (more than the winners margin of victory in Punjab and Federal elections). After the conclusion of these recounts, the ECP published a seat tally which confirmed PTI's position of being the largest party in the National Assembly. The margin for the Punjab election was narrow between Khan's PTI and Pakistan Muslim League (N), but independents and Pakistan Muslim League (Q) factions endorsed federal winners PTI, which led to Khan's party forming government in Punjab also. Thus PML(N) lost the elections both at the provincial and the federal level, becoming the opposition, nominating Shehbaz Sharif to be leader of the opposition at the federal level and his son Hamza Shahbaz as opposition leader in Punjab.

== Background ==
=== 2013 elections ===
Following the elections in 2013, Pakistan Muslim League (Nawaz), led by twice Prime Minister of Pakistan Nawaz Sharif, emerged as the largest party with 166 seats out of a total of 342 in the National Assembly. Although this was short of a majority, Sharif was able to form a government after several independents joined his party.

During the election campaign, Pakistan Tehreek-e-Insaf (PTI), led by prominent cricketer turned politician Imran Khan, was widely expected to have huge success in the polls. The party fell short of these expectations, instead only taking 35 seats. It became the 3rd largest party in the National Assembly and formed a coalition government in the restive north-western province of Khyber Pakhtunkhwa.

=== Azadi march (2014) ===
PTI had initially conceded the elections to PML (N), although they asked for manual recounts to be carried out in several constituencies where rigging had been allegedly carried out. These calls were not answered by the government or the Supreme Court, despite a 2,100 page white paper by the party which allegedly contained evidence of vote-rigging in favour of the PML (N). The Azadi March of 2014 (Azadi meaning Freedom in Urdu) was started by Khan on 14 August 2014 which demanded the government to call a snap election. The sit-in in Islamabad continued for 126 days, until the 2014 Peshawar school massacre occurred, which forced Khan to end the protest for the sake of 'national unity'. A judicial commission was formed by the government which would probe the allegations of vote-rigging: it found the election to have been largely conducted in a free and fair manner, while also stating that PTI's request for a probe was not "entirely unjustified".

=== Panama Papers case (2016) ===
On 3 April 2016 the International Consortium of Investigative Journalists (ICIJ) made 11.5 million secret documents, later known as the Panama Papers, available to the public. The documents, sourced from Panamanian law firm Mossack Fonseca, among other revelations about other public figures in many other countries, included details of eight offshore companies with links to the family of Nawaz Sharif, the then-incumbent Prime Minister of Pakistan, and his brother Shehbaz Sharif, the incumbent Chief Minister of Punjab. According to the ICIJ, Sharif's children Maryam Nawaz, Hassan Nawaz and Hussain Nawaz "were owners or had the right to authorise transactions for several companies".

Sharif refused to resign and instead make an unsuccessful attempt to form a judicial commission. The opposition leader Khan filed a petition to the Supreme Court of Pakistan on 29 August seeking the disqualification of Sharif from public office (which would automatically remove him of the office of Prime Minister). This petition was also supported by prominent political leaders Sheikh Rasheed (AML) and Siraj-ul-Haq (PAT). Khan called, once again, for his supporters to put Islamabad in lockdown until Sharif resigned, although this was called off soon before it was meant to take place.

On 20 April 2017, on a 3-2 verdict, the Supreme Court decided against the disqualification of Sharif, instead calling for a Joint Investigation Team (JIT) to be created which would probe these allegations further.

On 10 July 2017, JIT submitted a 275-page report in the apex court. The report requested NAB to file a reference against Sharif, his daughter Maryam, and his sons under section 9 of National Accountability Ordinance. Additionally, the report claimed that his daughter Maryam was guilty of falsifying documents, as she submitted a document from 2006 which used the Calibri font despite the font itself not being available for public use until 2007.

=== Disqualification of Nawaz Sharif (2017) ===
On 28 July 2017, following the submittal of the JIT report, the Supreme Court unanimously decided that Sharif was dishonest, therefore not fulfilling the requirements of articles 62 and 63 of the constitution which require one who holds public office to be Sadiq and Ameen (Urdu for Truthful and Virtuous). Hence, he was disqualified as Prime Minister and as a Member of the National Assembly. The court also ordered National Accountability Bureau to file a reference against Sharif, his family and his former Finance Minister Ishaq Dar on corruption charges.

== Electoral system ==
The 342 members of the National Assembly are elected by two methods in three categories; 272 are elected in single-member constituencies by first-past-the-post voting; 60 are reserved for women and 10 for religious minority groups; both sets of reserved seats use proportional representation with a 5% electoral threshold. This proportional number, however, is based on the number of seats won rather than votes cast. To win a simple majority, a party would have to take 137 seats.

The 2018 General Elections were held under new delimitation can of constituencies as a result of 2017 Census of Pakistan. Parliament of Pakistan amended the Constitution, allowing a one-time exemption for redrawing constituency boundaries using 2017 provisional census results. As per the notification issued on 5 March 2018, the Islamabad Capital Territory (ICT) now has three constituencies, Punjab 141, Sindh 61, Khyber Pakhtunkhwa 39, Balochistan 16 and Federally Administered Tribal Areas (FATA) has 12 constituencies in the National Assembly. 106 million people were registered to vote for members of the National Assembly of Pakistan and four Provincial Assemblies.

Likewise for elections to provincial assemblies, Punjab has 297 constituencies, Sindh 130, Khyber Pakhtunkhwa 99 and Balochistan 51.

=== Electoral reforms ===
In June 2017 the Economic Coordination Committee approved the procurement of new printing machines with a bridge loan of 864 million rupees. The government has also developed new software for the Election Commission of Pakistan and NADRA to ensure a "free, fair, impartial, transparent and peaceful general election." The former Federal Law Minister Zahid Hamid elaborated that youth reaching the age of 18 will automatically be registered as voters when they apply for a CNIC from NADRA.

== Contesting parties ==
Party	Political Position	Leader
Pakistan Muslim League (N)	Centre-right to right-wing	Shehbaz Sharif
Pakistan Peoples Party	Centre-left	Bilawal Bhutto Zardari
Pakistan Tehreek-e-Insaf	Centre	Imran Khan
Muttahida Qaumi Movement – Pakistan	Centre to Centre-left	Khalid Maqbool Siddiqui
Muttahida Majlis-e-Amal	Right-wing to far-right	Fazl-ur-Rehman
Pashtunkhwa Milli Awami Party	Left-wing	Mahmood Khan Achakzai
Awami National Party	Centre-left to left-wing	Asfandyar Wali Khan
Pak Sarzameen Party	Centre-left	Syed Mustafa Kamal
Tehreek Labbaik Pakistan	Far-right	Khadim Hussain Rizvi
Balochistan Awami Party	Centre	Jam Kamal Khan
Grand Democratic Alliance	Big tent	Pir Pagaro
Balochistan National Party (Mengal)	Left-wing	Akhtar Mengal

== Campaign ==
=== Major by-elections (2017–2018) ===
Following the disqualification of Nawaz Sharif, several by-elections were held throughout Pakistan.

==== Lahore by-election, September 2017 ====
The first of these was the by-election in Sharif's former constituency, NA-120 Lahore, which is located in the capital city of the Punjab province, a province where the PML (N) was the ruling party. It retained this seat, albeit with a much reduced majority due to gains by the PTI and minor Islamist parties.

==== Peshawar by-election, October 2017 ====
The second of these was a by election in Peshawar, capital city of the Khyber Pakhtunkhwa province, where the Pakistan Tehreek-e-Insaf| was the ruling party. NA-4 once again voted for PTI, despite a reduced majority: once again mainly due to the rise of Islamist parties. These by-elections largely were largely seen as indicators that the ruling parties in both Khyber Pakhtunkhwa and Punjab were still electorally strong.

==== Lodhran by-election, 2018 ====
On 15 December 2017, Jahangir Khan Tareen, General Secretary of the PTI, was disqualified from holding public office. Hence, his NA-154 Lodhran seat was vacated.

In a previous by-election in this constituency in 2015, Tareen won this seat with a majority in excess of 35,000 votes. Therefore, this seat was seen as a stronghold for the PTI.

In what was seen as an upset result, Iqbal Shah of the PML (N) won this by-election with a majority over 25,000 votes against Jahangir Tareen's son, Ali Tareen. Many saw this as a failure on the PTI's behalf, and the result led to a drop in morale for PTI workers.

=== Campaigning ===
The National Assembly and provincial assemblies of Pakistan dissolved as early as 28 May for Khyber Pakhtunkhwa and Sindh, and as late as 31 May for Punjab, Balochistan, and the National Assembly.

The assemblies dissolved during the holy month of Ramadan, a month where Muslims worldwide refrain from eating or drinking from sunrise to sundown. Hence, most major parties did not start campaigning until late June.

==== Nomination papers ====
On 4 June, parties and individuals started filing nomination papers for the elections. This process continued until 8 June. After this, the returning officer in each constituency began scrutiny of the nominated candidates and decided whether or not to accept the nomination papers.

The scrutiny resulted in many high-profile politicians having their nomination papers rejected: Imran Khan (chairman of PTI), Farooq Sattar (chairman of Muttahida Qaumi Movement (Pakistan) (MQM-P)) and Pervez Musharraf (chairman of All Pakistan Muslim League and former President), had their nomination papers rejected. Both Sattar and Khan had their nomination papers later accepted.

Additionally, politicians Fawad Chaudhry (Information Secretary of PTI) and Shahid Khaqan Abbasi (former Prime Minister) were disqualified from contesting these elections by election tribunals due to the non declaration of assets in their nomination papers. This was controversial because election tribunals were seen as not having the jurisdiction to disqualify candidates, rather only to accept or reject their nomination papers. The Lahore High Court eventually overturned these judgements and allowed the respective candidates to contest their elections. Two major politicians of Tehreek-e-Insaf from Chakwal, Sardar Ghulam Abbas and Sardar Aftab Akbar Khan were disqualified to contest elections producing major problem in Chakwal district for the party.

==== Pakistan Muslim League (Nawaz) ====
Pakistan Muslim League (Nawaz) launched its election campaign on 25 June 2018 from Karachi. On 5 July 2018, PMLN unveiled its election manifesto. Nevertheless, it has been stated there was, "lack of equality of opportunity" in the pre-election campaign, and there were systematic attempts to undermine the ruling party PML(N).

==== Pakistan Tehreek-e-Insaf ====
Pakistan Tehreek-e-Insaf started its election campaign on 24 June 2018 from Mianwali. On 9 July 2018, Imran Khan launched PTI's election manifesto. On 23 July 2018, PTI concluded its electioneering with rallies in Lahore.

==== Pakistan Peoples Party ====
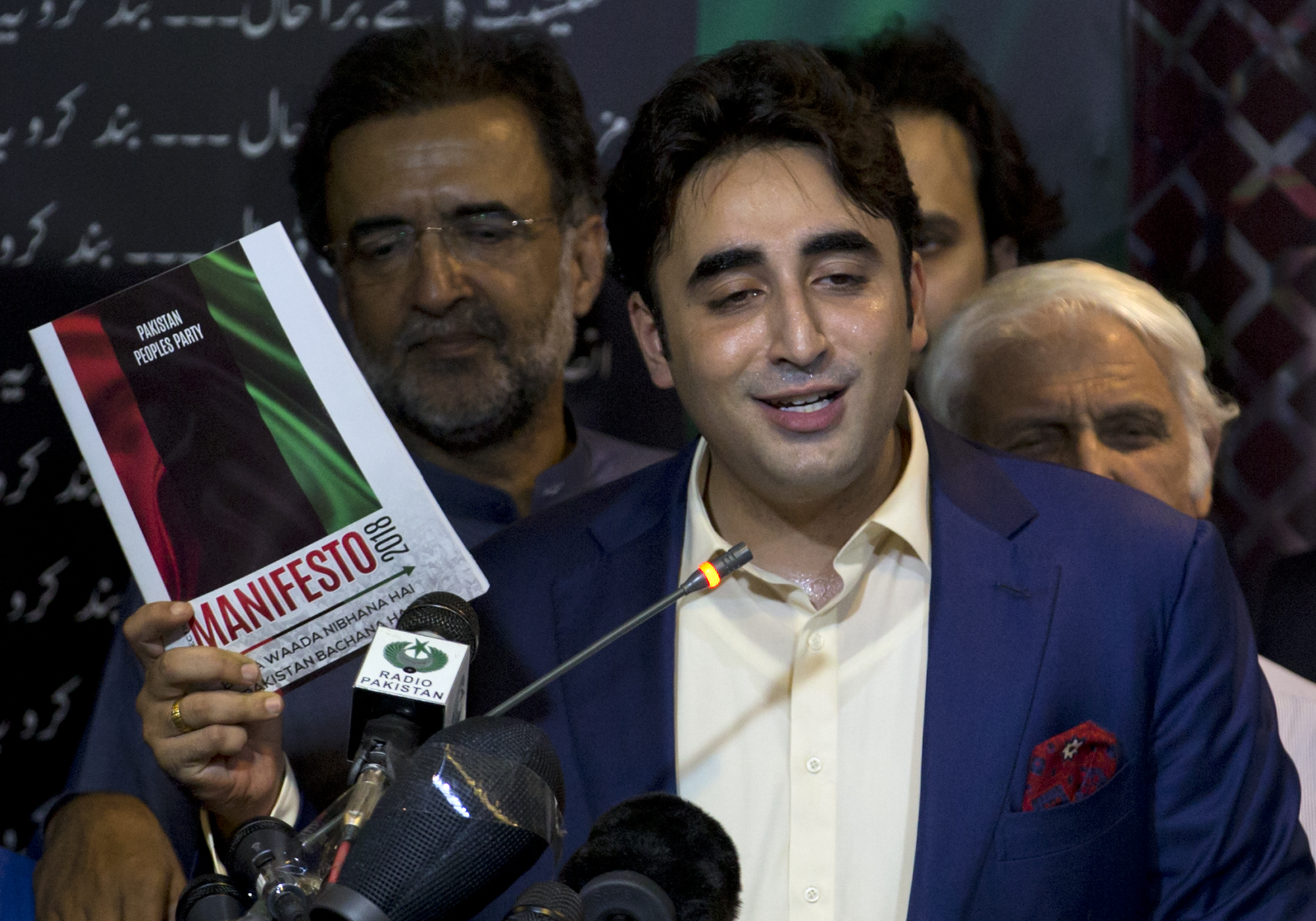
Bilawal Bhutto Zardari presenting PPP manifesto of 2018 general election

On 28 June 2018, PPP became the first political party to unveil its election manifesto. PPP kicked off its election campaign on 30 June 2018, as Bilawal inaugurated their election office in Lyari, Karachi.

== Opinion polls ==
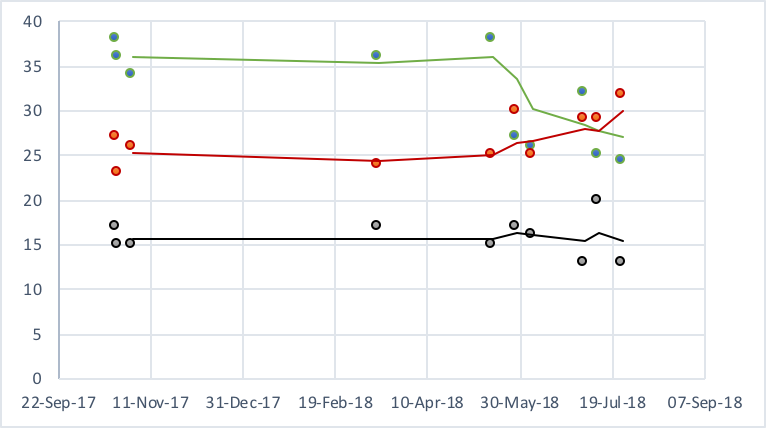
Each coloured line specifies a political party and how strong their voting intention is nationwide for the National Assembly, based on a 3-point moving average. Parties which poll below 10% are not shown. Pakistan Muslim League (N) Pakistan Tehreek-e-Insaf Pakistan Peoples Party

Date	Pollster	Publisher	Sample	PML-N	PTI	PPP	MQM-P	MMA*	ANP	Others	Lead
25 July 2018	Election 2018	ECP	53,123,733	24.35%	31.82%	13.01%	1.38%	4.81%	1.53%	22.98%	7.47%
12 July 2018	SDPI	Herald	6,004	25%	29%	20%	—N/a	3%	1%	20%	4%
4 July 2018	IPOR	GSP	3,735	32%	29%	13%	2%	3%	1%	20%	3%
6 June 2018	Gallup Pakistan	Geo/Jang	3,000	26%	25%	16%	—N/a	2%	1%	30%	1%
28 May 2018	Pulse Consultant	Geo/Jang	3,163	27%	30%	17%	1%	4%	1%	20%	3%
May 2018	Gallup Pakistan	Self	3,000	38%	25%	15%	22%				13%
Mar 2018	Gallup Pakistan	WSJ	2,000	36%	24%	17%	23%				12%
1 November 2017	Gallup Pakistan	Geo/Jang	3,000	34%	26%	15%	2%	2%	2%	19%	8%
25 October 2017	Pulse Consultant	Geo/Jang	3,243	36%	23%	15%	2%	1%	1%	22%	13%
24 October 2017	IPOR	GSP	4,540	38%	27%	17%	3%	1%	1%	14%	11%
24 Apr 2017	Gallup Pakistan	Self	1,400	36%	25%	16%	2%	3%	2%	16%	11%
24 Apr 2017	Gallup Pakistan	Self	1,400	38%	22%	17%	2%	2%	2%	14%	16%
27 Aug 2015	SDPI	Self	3,014	27%	33%	14%	1%	2%	1%	20%	6%
17 Jul 2014	SDPI	Herald	1,354	17%	33%	19%	5%	3%	3%	18%	14%
11 May 2013	Election 2013	ECP	45,388,404	32.77%	16.92%	15.23%	5.41%	3.22%	1.00%	25.57%	15.85%

*Muttahida Majlis-e-Amal is an alliance of Islamist political parties, formed in 2002 and dissolved after the 2008 elections. The restoration of this alliance occurred in December 2017. Polls conducted before the restoration show the sum for Jamiat Ulema-e-Islam (F), the major political party in this alliance.

== Conduct ==
There were 272 national and 577 provincial assembly constituencies, contested by over 3,600 and 8,800 candidates respectively. A total of 811,491 staff were deployed for election duties as presiding officers, assistant presiding officers, and polling officers, in addition to 371,000 armed forces personnel who provided security duties alongside police and other law enforcement agencies. There were 85,317 polling stations set up, comprising over 242,000 polling booths. The election watchdog FAFEN deployed 19,683 neutral observers accredited with the Election Commission to observe the voting and counting process at over 72,000 polling stations.

=== Violence ===
Several violent incidents took place in the month of July in the run up to the general election. In the beginning of the month, bombing targeted the PTI candidate for NA-48 (Tribal Area-IX), and the Muttahida Majlis-e-Amal's candidate in the Takhti Khel area of the Bannu. On 10 July, a suicide bombing by Tehrik-i-Taliban Pakistan (TTP) killed 20 people and injured 63 at an Awami National Party (ANP) rally in Peshawar. As the bombing killed ANP provincial candidate Haroon Bilour, the elections for Constituency PK-78 were postponed by the Election Commission. On 12 July, one political staff was killed in Peshawar, while two BAP staff were injured in Khuzdar. On 13 July, twin bombings by ISIS-K in Mastung and Bannu left 154 people dead and 220 injured. The bombings targeted JUI-F candidate Akram Khan Durrani, BAP candidate for the Nawabzada Siraj Raisani. On 22 July, the PTI candidate for constituency PK-99, Ikramullah Gandapur, was killed in a bombing near of Dera Ismail Khan. The same day, Akram Khan Durrani survived a second assassination attempt. On 24 July, three Pakistani Army soldiers and a civilian were killed in Kech District, Balochistan.

Several violent incidents took place on election day. A bombing in Quetta killed 31 and injured 35. In Swabi, a clash between PTI and ANI supporters left one dead and three injured. Another three were injured in a grenade attack outside a polling station in Larkana, while a man was shot dead in a political clash in Khanewal. Several more people were injured in 7 other incidents.

=== Allegations of election meddling ===
==== Pre-poll ====
There have been allegations by some international journalists and scholars, claiming that there was a plan between judiciary and military bodies to influence the outcome of the election. These allegations were also made by the outgoing PML(N) following Nawaz Sharif's disqualification for corruption. It was suggested that alleged goal of these attempts was to halt the party of Nawaz Sharif from coming into power and to bring the results in favor of PTI, so that Imran Khan – who is alleged as close to the military – can be installed as the prime minister. Khan has denied these allegations as a "foreign conspiracy" and "against the facts", while the military also categorically rejected them. There have been claims of PML (N)'s campaign material being ripped apart by authorities while leaving alone material belonging to PTI. There have been suggestions that candidates belonging to PML (N) have been coerced by ISI to switch to those parties whose future government can be better controlled by military. On the last day of scrutiny of nomination papers, seven PML (N) candidates from Southern Punjab returned their tickets leaving no option for PML (N) to field replacement candidates, depriving them an opportunity to win those seats. There have also been reports of election engineering by army and intelligence agencies in Balochistan province in favor of Balochistan Awami Party.

Reports further suggested that there was evidence of collusion between the judiciary and military, in that two military officials were appointed to the Joint Investigation Team to investigate corruption allegations against former prime minister Nawaz Sharif, which were further strengthened by the circumstances of the Avenfield case verdict against the Sharifs. Justice Shaukat Aziz Siddiqui, an Islamabad High Court senior justice, released a statement on 22 July alleging that judges were pressured by ISI not to release Sharif before the election. However, he provided no evidence and was at the time facing corruption and misconduct charges pending at the Supreme Judicial Council, leading to rumours about the timing of his statement. Pakistan's Chief Justice Saqib Nisar said he felt "saddened" at Siddiqui's comments, and whilst criticising them, stated that "as the head of judiciary, I assure you that we are not under any sort of pressure". There have been allegations that the micromanagement of political parties and the censorship of the newspapers, social media and TV channels is to further influence the election result. An official from the Human Rights Commission of Pakistan stated that "The level of army interference and political engineering is unprecedented." The summary of the Human Rights Commission of Pakistan fact finding exercise reported curbs on freedom of expression, including curbs to distribution in newspapers, TV, journalists, digital media and press advice and intimidation by intelligence agencies. The curbs were in favor of PTI, with respondents reporting that "criticism of the PTI" was a topic unpopular with the intelligence agencies. "Another reportedly common piece of press advice to the broadcast media [from the intelligence agencies] that the channel should give greater coverage to PTI rallies and only minimal coverage to other parties' events". Another institution, the National Accountability Bureau has been described as being used by military intelligence agencies, including ISI, to bring politicians in line by threatening to bring corruption cases against them. Due to interference by military and intelligence agencies, The Financial Times described these elections as "the dirtiest in years".

Furthermore, the EU observer mission released their report after the election stating that there were "systematic attempts to undermine the ruling party", "lack of equality of opportunity", pressure on the media, far stronger efforts than usual to encourage switching parties and judicial conduct had all negatively influenced the vote.

Some of these allegations have also been made by certain political parties and figures more prominently by PML (N). Among the politicians, Farhatullah Babar has been very vocal against the election meddling by military describing it as a "creeping coup against civilian authority". Raza Rabbani also leveled the same allegations including the Election Commission of Pakistan, National Accountability Bureau and security agencies as the culprit behind pre-poll rigging.

==== Election day ====
The election results were scheduled to be released 2am the next day; however, this was delayed due to glitches in "Results Transmission System" (RTS), an Android and iPhone-based app that was to be used for sending results from 85,000 polling stations to the ECP headquarters. Xinhua reported that during the RTS breakdown, PTI was leading in 108 National Assembly seats, later final results issued by the election commission showed that PTI had won 116 seats. The system was initially running smoothly but started to malfunction when the results started pouring in large numbers. Another issue was related to weak wifi and 3G signals: presiding officers could not get strong enough signals inside the polling station to transmit the result, and were not allowed to leave the station (to get better signals) until they had transmitted the result. Eventually the election results were sent back to the ECP via fax. Some alleged the delays were due to a "conspiracy".

Almost all political parties, with the exception of PTI, have alleged large scale election day rigging. The winning PTI have alleged rigging in some constituencies as well. The fairness of the election was also criticized due to the Election Commission's failure to provide Form 45s, official forms which include the tally of votes and are prepared in the presence of political agents of all the candidates. Party leaders alleged that their representatives were barred from polling stations before counting began and the Form 45s were prepared in their absence and behind closed doors. In some instances, the representatives were given results on plain paper instead of official forms. In another instance, the presiding officer signed blank forms, allowing the possibility of results being manipulated afterwards. Independent candidate Jibran Nasir also made similar allegations. There was also an incident of seven people being arrested for alleged vote rigging in Karachi. According to FAFEN observer Sarwar Bari, "Only one polling agent of every party is allowed when Form 45 is given out by the polling staff, so we can't rule out the fact that it could be a misunderstanding." A few days after the election, in the NA-241 (Korangi Karachi-III) constituency, ballots cast for candidates of PML (N), PPP, and MQM-P were found in a garbage heap. A PTI candidate won the election in that constituency.

Chairman of winning party Imran Khan pledged that he will allow to open any constituency his opponents think are rigged, he said that opposition has full right into recounting or accountability over election process to ensure transparency.

The Free and Fair Election Network, an election watchdog, said the 2018 polls were "more transparent" in some aspects than the previous elections and that "significant improvements in the quality of critical electoral processes" inspired "greater public confidence". According to former Indian Chief Election Commissioner S. Y. Quraishi, a member of the international observers group in Pakistan, the election system was transparent, free and fair, and the minor technical glitches which showed up later in the day were due to inexperience.

On 12 August 2018, The News reported that over 90% of the Form 45s published on the ECP's website lacked signatures from polling agents, despite Section 90(12) of the Elections Act 2017 requiring presiding officers to obtain them or note a refusal. An ECP spokesperson attributed the omission to the absence of a designated signature box on the form and claimed agents had signed tamper-evident result bags instead. A later audit by FAFEN found that 95% of the uploaded forms lacked polling agent signatures. The ECP had uploaded the scanned forms on 8 August 2018, meeting a 14-day statutory deadline under Section 95(10) of the Elections Act amid opposition criticism over missing copies.

== Results ==
=== National Assembly ===
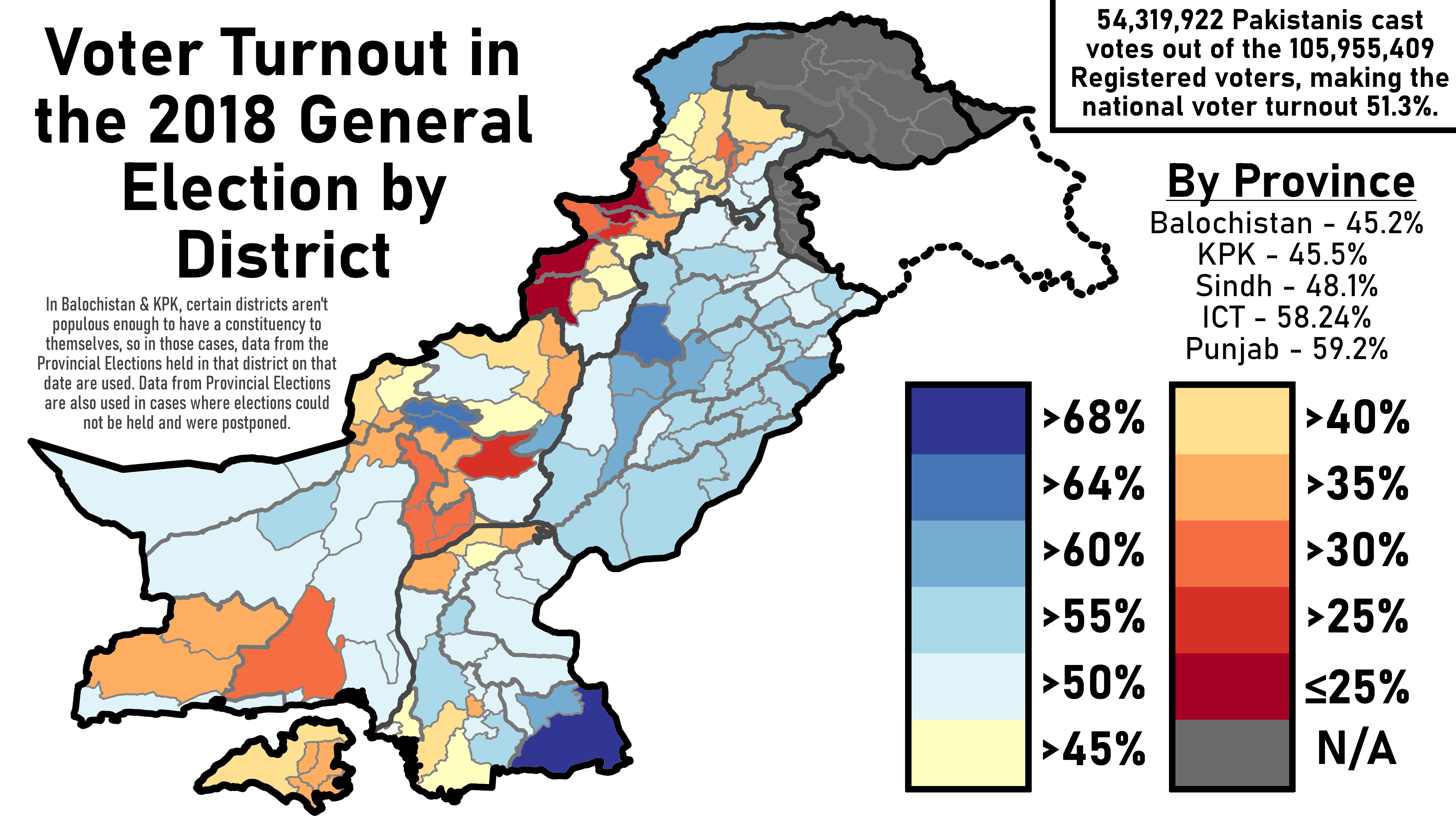
District-by-district map of voter turnout in the 2018 Pakistani General Election with data from the ECP (Election Commission of Pakistan).

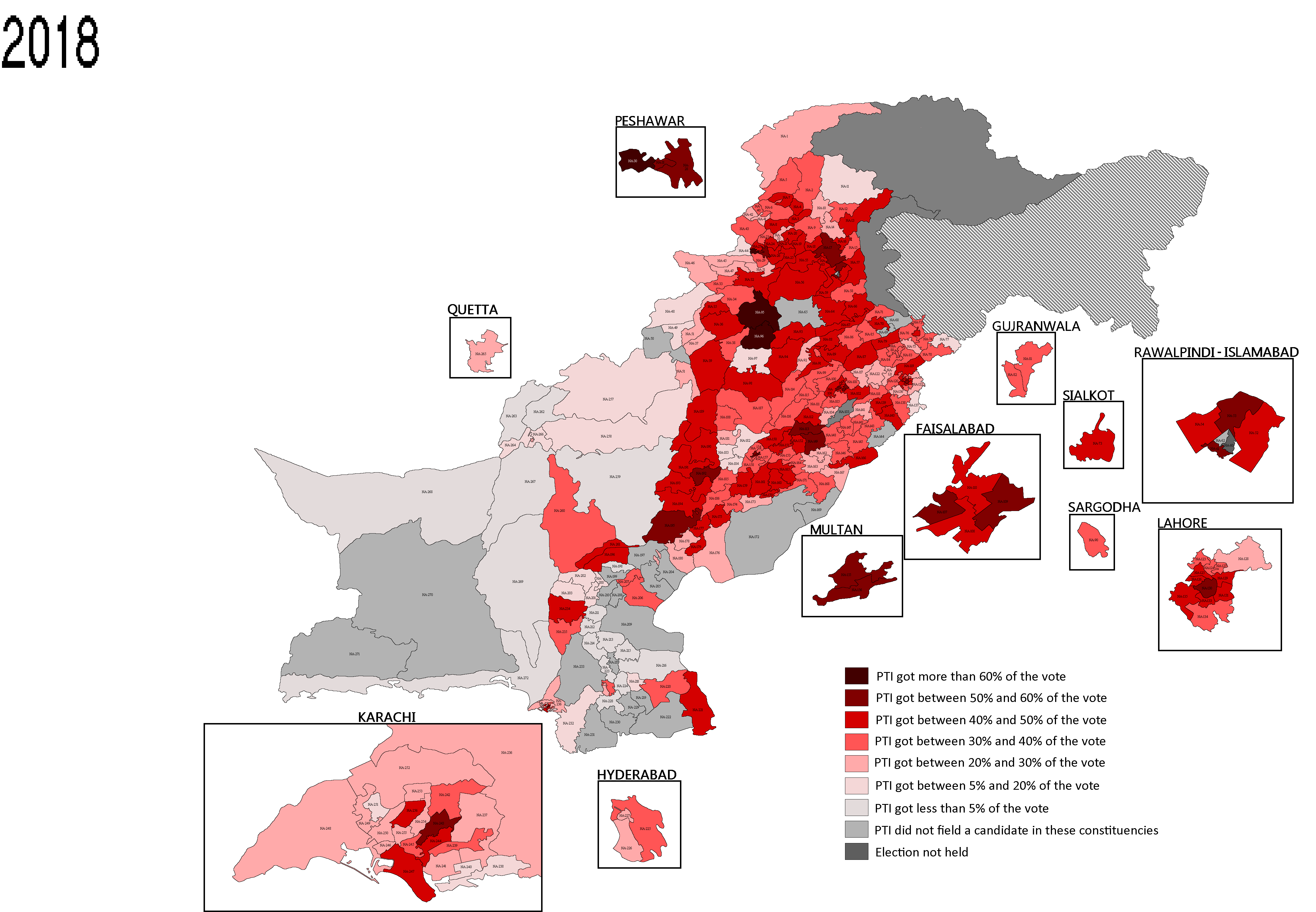
Pakistan Tehreek-e-Insaf vote share

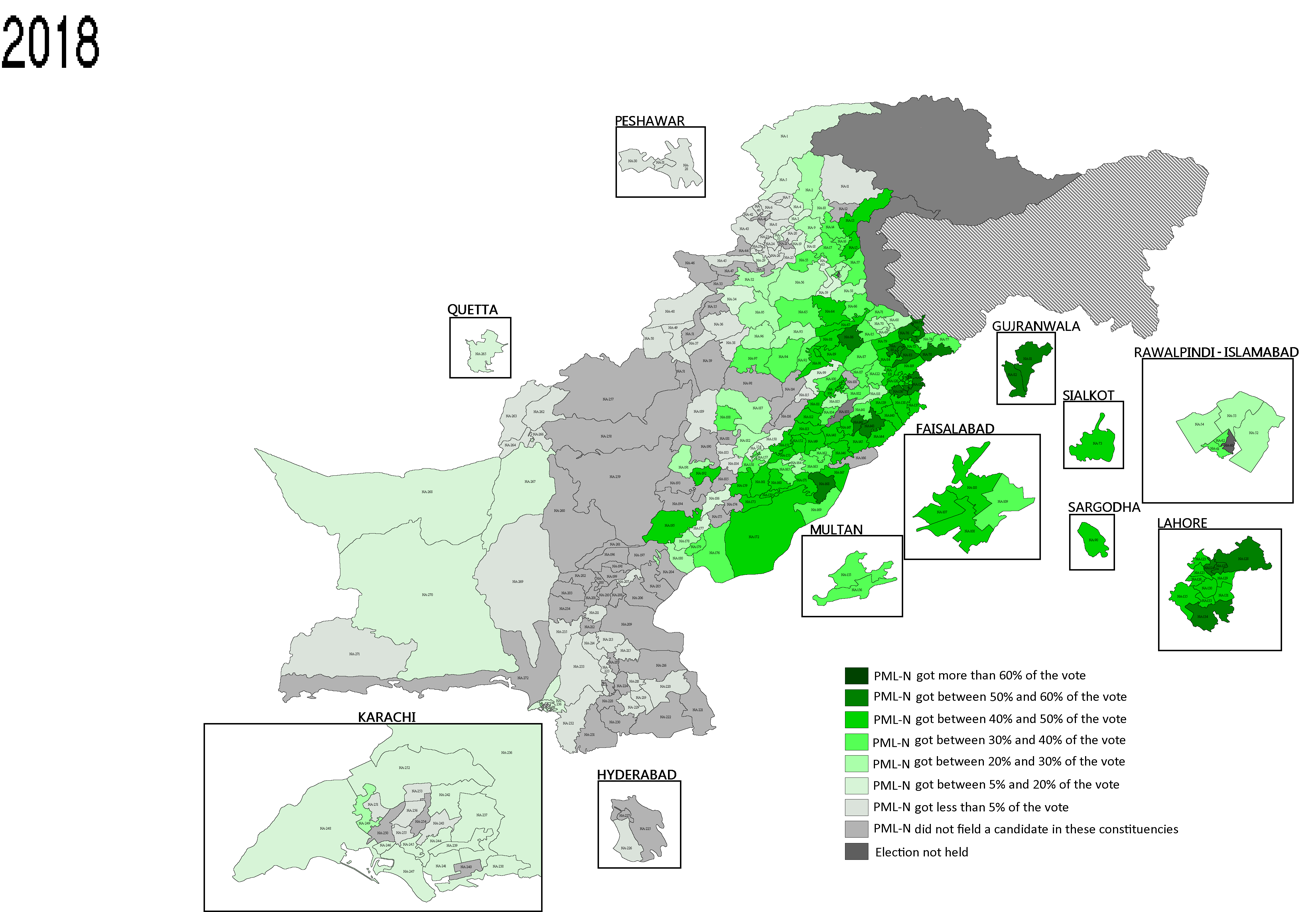
Pakistan Muslim League (N) vote share

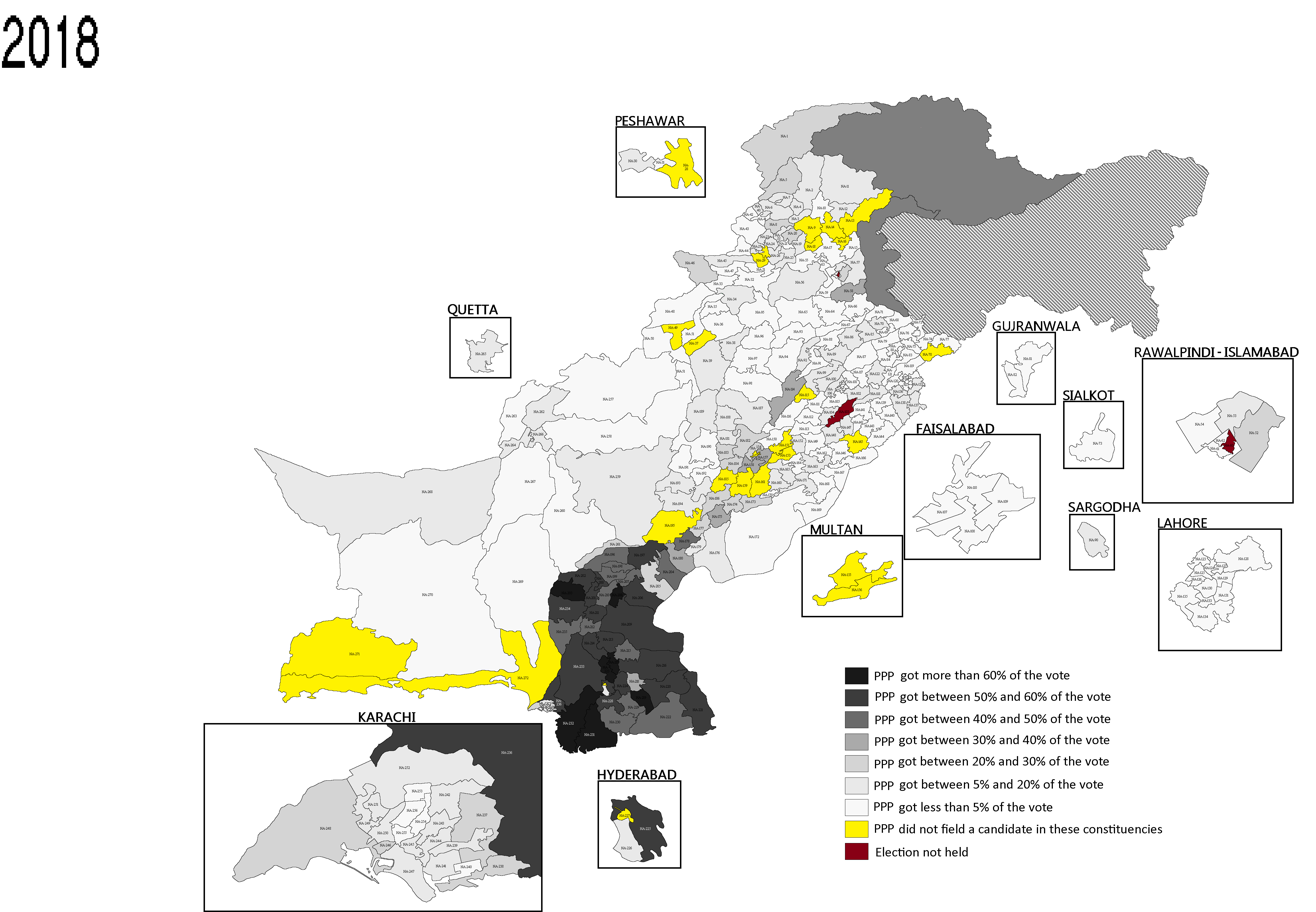
Pakistan Peoples Party vote share

Party	Votes	%	Seats			
Party	Votes	%	General	Women	Minority	Total
Pakistan Tehreek-e-Insaf	16,903,702	31.82	118	28	5	151
Pakistan Muslim League (N)	12,934,589	24.35	65	16	2	83
Pakistan People's Party	6,924,356	13.03	44	9	2	55
Muttahida Majlis-e-Amal	2,573,939	4.85	12	2	1	15
Tehreek-e-Labbaik Pakistan	2,234,316	4.21	0	0	0	0
Grand Democratic Alliance	1,260,147	2.37	2	1	0	3
Awami National Party	815,998	1.54	1	0	0	1
Muttahida Qaumi Movement – Pakistan	733,245	1.38	6	1	0	7
Pakistan Muslim League (Q)	517,408	0.97	4	1	0	5
Balochistan Awami Party	319,348	0.60	4	1	0	5
Balochistan National Party (Mengal)	238,817	0.45	3	1	0	4
Allah-o-Akbar Tehreek	172,120	0.32	0	0	0	0
Sindh United Party	140,303	0.26	0	0	0	0
Pashtunkhwa Milli Awami Party	134,846	0.25	0	0	0	0
Pak Sarzameen Party	126,128	0.24	0	0	0	0
Awami Muslim League	119,362	0.22	1	0	0	1
Awami Raj Party	115,226	0.22	0	0	0	0
Pakistan Muslim League (F)	72,553	0.14	0	0	0	0
Qaumi Watan Party	57,249	0.11	0	0	0	0
Pakistan Rah-e-Haq Party	55,859	0.11	0	0	0	0
Balochistan National Party (Awami)	55,206	0.10	0	0	0	0
Tehreek-e-Labbaik Islam	55,155	0.10	0	0	0	0
All Pakistan Muslim League	36,566	0.07	0	0	0	0
Pakistan National Muslim League	35,415	0.07	0	0	0	0
Jamiat Ulama-e-Islam Nazryati	34,247	0.06	0	0	0	0
Pakistan Human Party	34,246	0.06	0	0	0	0
National Party	33,432	0.06	0	0	0	0
Muttahida Qaumi Movement - London	28,469	0.05	0	0	0	0
Jamiat Ulema-e-Islam (S)	24,582	0.05	0	0	0	0
Jamhoori Wattan Party	23,274	0.04	1	0	0	1
Jamiat Ulema-e-Pakistan (Noorani)	22,145	0.04	0	0	0	0
Mohajir Qaumi Movement Pakistan	21,521	0.04	0	0	0	0
Majlis Wahdat-e-Muslimeen	19,615	0.04	0	0	0	0
Awami Workers Party	17,935	0.03	0	0	0	0
Pakistan Justice and Democratic Party	12,637	0.02	0	0	0	0
Pakistan Kissan Ittehad (Ch. Anwar)	12,255	0.02	0	0	0	0
Pakistan Peoples Party (Shaheed Bhutto)	10,032	0.02	0	0	0	0
Hazara Democratic Party	7,942	0.01	0	0	0	0
Pakistan Tehreek-e-Insaf Nazriati	6,755	0.01	0	0	0	0
Pakistan Muslim Alliance	6,703	0.01	0	0	0	0
Pakistan Siraiki Party (T)	6,523	0.01	0	0	0	0
Sunni Tehreek	5,943	0.01	0	0	0	0
Sunni Ittehad Council	5,939	0.01	0	0	0	0
Tehreek Jawanan Pakistan	5,841	0.01	0	0	0	0
Pakistan Awami Inqelabi League	5,046	0.01	0	0	0	0
Roshan Pakistan League	4,267	0.01	0	0	0	0
Tehreek Tabdili Nizam Pakistan	4,161	0.01	0	0	0	0
Pakistan Tehreek-e-Insaf-Gulalai	4,146	0.01	0	0	0	0
Balochistan National Movement	3,971	0.01	0	0	0	0
Tabdeeli Pasand Party Pakistan	3,698	0.01	0	0	0	0
Amun Taraqqi Party	3,646	0.01	0	0	0	0
Jamote Qaumi Movement	3,269	0.01	0	0	0	0
Barabri Party Pakistan	2,702	0.01	0	0	0	0
Move On Pakistan	2,580	0.00	0	0	0	0
All Pakistan Muslim League (Jinnah)	2,418	0.00	0	0	0	0
Pakistan Falah Party	2,167	0.00	0	0	0	0
Pasban Pakistan	2,154	0.00	0	0	0	0
Pakistan Awami League	1,780	0.00	0	0	0	0
Pakistan Aman Tehreek	1,718	0.00	0	0	0	0
Pakistan Peoples Party	1,587	0.00	0	0	0	0
Pakistan Qaumi Yakjehti Party	1,571	0.00	0	0	0	0
Pakistan Muslim League (Z)	1,406	0.00	0	0	0	0
Pakistan Muslim League (Sher-e-Bangal)	1,332	0.00	0	0	0	0
Pakistan Freedom Movement	1,096	0.00	0	0	0	0
Mustaqbil Pakistan	1,053	0.00	0	0	0	0
Humdardan-e-Watan Pakistan	936	0.00	0	0	0	0
Pakistan Aman Party	852	0.00	0	0	0	0
Aam Admi Tehreek Pakistan	828	0.00	0	0	0	0
Awami Justice Party Pakistan	730	0.00	0	0	0	0
Saraiskistan Democratic Party	724	0.00	0	0	0	0
Pakistan Supreme Democratic	708	0.00	0	0	0	0
Aam Log Party Pakistan	606	0.00	0	0	0	0
Tehreek-e-Suba Hazara Pakistan	545	0.00	0	0	0	0
Awam League	493	0.00	0	0	0	0
Pakistan Welfare Party	426	0.00	0	0	0	0
Aam Awam Party	364	0.00	0	0	0	0
Jannat Pakistan Party	248	0.00	0	0	0	0
National Peace Council Party	242	0.00	0	0	0	0
Front National (Pakistan)	233	0.00	0	0	0	0
Pakistan Muslim League Organization	211	0.00	0	0	0	0
All Pakistan Tehreek	155	0.00	0	0	0	0
Pakistan Human Rights Party	139	0.00	0	0	0	0
Pakistan Tehreek-e-Insaniat	98	0.00	0	0	0	0
Pakistan Muslim League Council	91	0.00	0	0	0	0
Peoples Movement of Pakistan (PMP)	37	0.00	0	0	0	0
Independents	6,087,410	11.46	11	0	0	11
Postponed			-	–	–	-
Total	53,123,733	100.00	272	60	10	342
Source: ECP ECP (pdf)

=== By constituency ===
Province	Assembly Constituency	Winner				Runner-up				Margin	Turnout
Province	Assembly Constituency	Candidate	Party	Votes		Candidate	Party	Votes		Margin	Turnout
Province	Assembly Constituency	Candidate	Party	No.	%	Candidate	Party	No.	%	No.	%
Khyber Pakhtunkhwa	NA-1 Chitral	Abdul Akbar Chitrali	MMA	49,035	29.65	Abdul Latif	PTI	38,819	23.41	10,216	61.36
Khyber Pakhtunkhwa	NA-2 Swat-I	Haider Ali Khan	PTI	61,834	37.14	Amir Muqam	PML(N)	41,366	24.84	20,468	43.48
Khyber Pakhtunkhwa	NA-3 Swat-II	Saleem Rehman	PTI	68,280	42.02	Shehbaz Sharif	PML(N)	22,758	14.01	45,522	40.50
Khyber Pakhtunkhwa	NA-4 Swat-III	Murad Saeed	PTI	71,663	44.51	Saleem Khan	ANP	31,209	19.39	40,454	39.36
Khyber Pakhtunkhwa	NA-5 Upper Dir	Sahibzada Sibghatullah	PTI	66,654	30.71	Sahabzada Tariq Ullah	MMA	58,307	26.86	8,347	48.52
Khyber Pakhtunkhwa	NA-6 Lower Dir-I	Mehboob Shah	PTI	63,717	36.54	Asad Ullah	MMA	37,687	21.61	26,030	49.65
Khyber Pakhtunkhwa	NA-7 Lower Dir-II	Bashir Khan	PTI	63,071	42.81	Siraj-ul-Haq	MMA	46,927	31.85	16,144	44.57
Khyber Pakhtunkhwa	NA-8 Malakand	Junaid Akbar	PTI	81,788	43.59	Bilawal Bhutto	PPP	44,091	23.50	37,697	48.56
Khyber Pakhtunkhwa	NA-9 Buner	Sher Akbar Khan	PTI	58,317	31.59	Kamran Khan	PML(N)	39,213	21.24	19,104	41.44
Khyber Pakhtunkhwa	NA-10 Shangla	Ibadullah	PML(N)	35,178	26.83	Sadid-ur-Rehman	ANP	33,650	25.67	1,528	35.02
Khyber Pakhtunkhwa	NA-11 Kohistan	Afreen Khan	MMA	16,480	25.34	Dost Muhammad Shakir	IND	14,536	22.35	1,944	42.07
Khyber Pakhtunkhwa	NA-12 Battagram	Nawaz Khan	PTI	35,120	37.57	Qari Muhammad Yousuf	MMA	24,307	26.00	10,813	36.21
Khyber Pakhtunkhwa	NA-13 Mansehra-I	Saleh Muhammad	PTI	1,08,950	41.43	Shahjahan Yousuf	PML(N)	1,07,114	40.74	1,836	49.90
Khyber Pakhtunkhwa	NA-14 Mansehra-cum-Torghar	Muhammad Sajjad	PML(N)	75,220	35.31	Zar Gul Khan	PTI	59,918	28.13	15,302	41.69
Khyber Pakhtunkhwa	NA-15 Abbottabad-I	Murtaza Javed Abbasi	PML(N)	95,348	39.32	Ali Asghar Khan	PTI	82,073	33.85	13,275	50.69
Khyber Pakhtunkhwa	NA-16 Abbottabad-II	Ali Khan Jadoon	PTI	85,763	47.50	Mohabat Khan	PML(N)	55,102	30.52	30,661	50.10
Khyber Pakhtunkhwa	NA-17 Haripur	Omar Ayub Khan	PTI	1,73,125	50.26	Babar Nawaz Khan	PML(N)	1,33,158	38.66	39,967	52.38
Khyber Pakhtunkhwa	NA-18 Swabi-I	Asad Qaiser	PTI	79,428	40.47	Fazal Ali	MMA	34,684	17.67	44,744	43.72
Khyber Pakhtunkhwa	NA-19 Swabi-II	Usman Khan Tarakai	PTI	84,489	39.58	Waris Khan	ANP	54,080	25.33	30,409	46.05
Khyber Pakhtunkhwa	NA-20 Mardan-I	Mujahid Ali	PTI	78,188	40.17	Gul Nawaz Khan	ANP	38,741	19.91	39,447	45.20
Khyber Pakhtunkhwa	NA-21 Mardan-II	Haider Hoti	ANP	78,911	40.97	Atif Khan	PTI	78,876	40.96	35	45.89
Khyber Pakhtunkhwa	NA-22 Mardan-III	Ali Muhammad Khan	PTI	58,652	29.06	Maulana Muhammad Qasim	MMA	56,587	28.04	2,065	51.80
Khyber Pakhtunkhwa	NA-23 Charsadda-I	Anwar Taj	PTI	61,911	33.42	Zafar Ullah Khan	MMA	43,541	23.50	18,370	44.38
Khyber Pakhtunkhwa	NA-24 Charsadda-II	Fazal Muhammad Khan	PTI	83,596	39.72	Asfandyar Wali	ANP	59,809	28.42	23,787	45.41
Khyber Pakhtunkhwa	NA-25 Nowshera-I	Pervaiz Khattak	PTI	82,208	44.42	Khan Pervaiz	PPP	35,661	19.27	46,547	48.83
Khyber Pakhtunkhwa	NA-26 Nowshera-II	Imran Khattak	PTI	90,298	47.94	Jamal Khan Khattak	ANP	47,124	25.02	43,174	49.92
Khyber Pakhtunkhwa	NA-27 Peshawar-I	Noor Alam Khan	PTI	71,242	46.04	Haji Ghulam Ali	MMA	39,358	25.43	31,884	45.87
Khyber Pakhtunkhwa	NA-28 Peshawar-II	Arbab Amir Ayub	PTI	74,525	49.44	Sabir Hussain Awan	MMA	27,395	18.17	47,130	44.79
Khyber Pakhtunkhwa	NA-29 Peshawar-III	Nasir Khan Mosazai	PTI	49,779	38.21	Naeem Jan	MMA	29,415	22.58	20,364	40.67
Khyber Pakhtunkhwa	NA-30 Peshawar-IV	Sher Ali Arbab	PTI	73,885	58.75	Arbab Najeebullah Khan	MMA	18,197	14.47	55,688	40.72
Khyber Pakhtunkhwa	NA-31 Peshawar-V	Shaukat Ali	PTI	87,975	53.37	Ghulam Ahmed Bilour	ANP	42,526	25.80	45,449	42.24
Khyber Pakhtunkhwa	NA-32 Kohat	Shehryar Afridi	PTI	82,952	41.73	Gohar Muhamad Khan Bangash	MMA	47,825	24.06	35,127	39.23
Khyber Pakhtunkhwa	NA-33 Hangu	Khial Zaman	PTI	28,882	35.30	Atiq ur Rehman	MMA	28,154	34.41	728	29.65
Khyber Pakhtunkhwa	NA-34 Karak	Shahid Ahmed Khattak	PTI	77,270	38.37	Mir Zakim Khan	MMA	28,548	14.18	48,722	49.79
Khyber Pakhtunkhwa	NA-35 Bannu	Imran Khan	PTI	1,13,843	46.21	Akram Durrani	MMA	1,06,842	43.37	7,001	42.56
Khyber Pakhtunkhwa	NA-36 Lakki Marwat	Muhammad Anwar	MMA	91,396	43.34	Ishfaq Ahmed Khan	PTI	81,859	38.82	9,537	50.06
Khyber Pakhtunkhwa	NA-37 Tank	Asad Mehmood	MMA	28,563	35.62	Habib Ullah Khan	PTI	16,659	20.77	11,904	44.34
Khyber Pakhtunkhwa	NA-38 D I Khan-I	Ali Amin Gandapur	PTI	81,032	37.41	Fazal-ur-Rehman	MMA	45,796	21.15	35,236	55.31
Khyber Pakhtunkhwa	NA-39 D I Khan-II	Muhammad Yaqub Sheikh	PTI	79,672	47.73	Fazal-ur-Rehman	MMA	52,327	31.35	27,345	50.83
Khyber Pakhtunkhwa	NA-40 Bajaur-I	Gul Dad Khan	PTI	34,683	32.97	Sardar Khan	IND	18,025	17.13	16,658	41.16
Khyber Pakhtunkhwa	NA-41 Bajaur-II	Gul Zafar Khan	PTI	22,767	25.03	Qari Abdul Majeed	IND	14,960	16.45	7,807	38.35
Khyber Pakhtunkhwa	NA-42 Mohmand	Sajid Khan	PTI	22,742	24.45	Bilal Rehman	IND	21,106	22.69	1,636	36.11
Khyber Pakhtunkhwa	NA-43 Khyber-I	Noor-ul-Haq Qadri	PTI	33,871	38.98	Shahjee Gul Afridi	IND	30,428	35.02	3,443	38.34
Khyber Pakhtunkhwa	NA-44 Khyber-II	Mohammed Iqbal Khan Afridi	PTI	12,580	18.61	Hameed Ullah Jan	IND	9,184	13.58	3,396	25.49
Khyber Pakhtunkhwa	NA-45 Kurram-I	Munir Orakzai	MMA	16,255	28.03	Said Jamal	PTI	13,495	23.27	2,760	35.07
Khyber Pakhtunkhwa	NA-46 Kurram-II	Sajid Hussain Turi	PPP	21,506	28.76	Syed Iqbal Manan	PTI	17,004	22.74	4,502	43.35
Khyber Pakhtunkhwa	NA-47 Orakzai	Jawad Hussain	PTI	11,523	20.55	Qasim Gul	MMA	6,988	12.46	4,535	33.53
Khyber Pakhtunkhwa	NA-48 North Waziristan	Mohsin Dawar	IND	16,526	25.80	Misbahuddin	MMA	15,363	23.98	1,163	23.36
Khyber Pakhtunkhwa	NA-49 South Waziristan-I	Muhammad Jamal Ud din	MMA	7,778	20.93	Dost Muhammad Khan	PTI	6,591	17.74	1,187	20.84
Khyber Pakhtunkhwa	NA-50 South Waziristan-II	Ali Wazir	IND	23,589	48.85	Tariq Gilani	IND	8,254	17.09	15,335	33.10
Khyber Pakhtunkhwa	NA-51 Frontier Regions	Abdul Shakor	MMA	21,962	31.26	Qaiser Jamal	PTI	18,754	26.70	3,208	42.16
ICT	NA-52 Islamabad-I	Khurram Shehzad Nawaz	PTI	64,690	42.93	Muhammad Afzal Khokhar	PPP	34,072	22.61	30,618	64.26
ICT	NA-53 Islamabad-II	Imran Khan	PTI	92,891	53.09	Shahid Khaqan Abbasi	PML(N)	44,314	25.33	48,577	56.53
ICT	NA-54 Islamabad-III	Asad Umar	PTI	56,945	47.98	Anjum Aqeel Khan	PML(N)	32,991	27.80	23,954	54.24
Punjab	NA-55 Attock-I	Tahir Sadiq	PTI	1,45,168	47.48	Sheikh Aftab Ahmed	PML(N)	1,01,773	33.29	43,395	53.47
Punjab	NA-56 Attock-II	Tahir Sadiq	PTI	1,63,325	41.92	Malik Sohail Khan	PML(N)	99,404	25.51	63,921	62.56
Punjab	NA-57 Rawalpindi-I	Sadaqat Ali Abbasi	PTI	1,36,249	41.72	Shahid Khaqan Abbasi	PML(N)	1,24,703	38.18	11,546	55.32
Punjab	NA-58 Rawalpindi-II	Raja Pervez Ashraf	PPP	1,25,480	38.11	Choudhary Muhammad Azeem	PTI	97,084	29.48	28,396	54.00
Punjab	NA-59 Rawalpindi-III	Ghulam Sarwar Khan	PTI	89,055	42.41	Chaudhry Nisar Ali Khan	IND	66,369	31.61	22,686	58.78
Punjab	NA-60 Rawalpindi-IV	Election postponed									
Punjab	NA-61 Rawalpindi-V	Aamir Mehmood Kiani	PTI	1,05,086	50.74	Malik Ibrar Ahmed	PML(N)	60,135	29.04	44,951	51.38
Punjab	NA-62 Rawalpindi-VI	Sheikh Rasheed Ahmad	AML	1,19,362	49.97	Daniyal Chaudhary	PML(N)	91,879	38.76	26,407	52.01
Punjab	NA-63 Rawalpindi-VII	Ghulam Sarwar Khan	PTI	1,00,986	47.67	Chaudhry Nisar Ali Khan	IND	65,767	31.05	35,219	58.14
Punjab	NA-64 Chakwal-I	Zulfiqar Ali Khan Dullah	PTI	1,55,214	48.44	Tahir Iqbal	PML(N)	1,30,051	40.59	25,163	58.15
Punjab	NA-65 Chakwal-II	Chaudhry Pervaiz Elahi	PML(Q)	1,57,497	51.31	Muhammad Faiz Malik	PML(N)	1,06,081	34.56	51,416	57.35
Punjab	NA-66 Jhelum-I	Chaudhry Farrukh Altaf	PTI	1,12,356	39.96	Chaudhary Nadeem Khadim	PML(N)	92,912	33.05	19,444	51.94
Punjab	NA-67 Jhelum-II	Fawad Chaudhry	PTI	93,102	44.40	Raja Matloob Mehdi	PML(N)	82,475	39.34	10,607	51.87
Punjab	NA-68 Gujrat-I	Chaudhry Hussain Elahi	PML(Q)	1,04,678	43.50	Nawabzada Ghazanfar Ali Gul	PML(N)	68,810	28.59	35,868	53.01
Punjab	NA-69 Gujrat-II	Chaudhry Pervaiz Elahi	PML(Q)	1,22,336	57.50	Chaudhary Mubashir Hussain	PML(N)	49,295	23.17	73,041	46.60
Punjab	NA-70 Gujrat-III	Syed Faizul Hassan Shah	PTI	95,168	38.67	Chaudhry Jaffar Iqbal	PML(N)	67,233	27.32	27,935	49.74
Punjab	NA-71 Gujrat-IV	Chaudhry Abid Raza	PML(N)	88,580	35.00	Muhammad Ilyas Chaudhary	PTI	81,438	32.18	7,142	50.87
Punjab	NA-72 Sialkot-I	Armaghan Subhani	PML(N)	1,29,041	49.65	Firdous Ashiq Awan	PTI	91,393	35.16	37,648	58.11
Punjab	NA-73 Sialkot-II	Khawaja Asif	PML(N)	1,16,957	46.06	Usman Dar	PTI	1,15,464	45.47	1,493	51.99
Punjab	NA-74 Sialkot-III	Ali Zahid	PML(N)	97,235	36.89	Ghulam Abbas	PTI	93,734	35.56	3,501	55.40
Punjab	NA-75 Sialkot-IV	Syed Iftikhar Ul Hassan	PML(N)	1,01,617	40.16	Ali Asjad Malhi	PTI	61,432	24.28	40,185	55.84
Punjab	NA-76 Sialkot-V	Shamim Ahmed	PML(N)	1,33,664	49.33	Muhammad Aslam Ghumman	PTI	93,190	34.39	40,474	57.68
Punjab	NA-77 Narowal-I	Mehnaz Aziz	PML(N)	1,06,366	38.16	Muhammad Tariq Anis	IND	70,596	25.33	35,770	54.86
Punjab	NA-78 Narowal-II	Ahsan Iqbal	PML(N)	1,59,651	57.47	Abrar-ul-Haq	PTI	88,250	31.77	71,401	55.06
Punjab	NA-79 Gujranwala-I	Nisar Ahmed Cheema	PML(N)	1,42,545	48.13	Muhammad Ahmed Chattha	PTI	1,18,709	40.08	23,836	54.66
Punjab	NA-80 Gujranwala-II	Chaudhry Mehmood Bashir	PML(N)	1,08,653	50.55	Mian Tariq Mehmood	PTI	71,937	33.47	36,716	53.36
Punjab	NA-81 Gujranwala-III	Khurram Dastgir Khan	PML(N)	1,30,837	51.76	Chaudhary Muhammad Siddique	PTI	88,166	34.88	42,671	50.58
Punjab	NA-82 Gujranwala-IV	Usman Ibrahim	PML(N)	1,17,520	50.90	Ali Ashraf Mughal	PTI	67,400	29.19	50,120	52.26
Punjab	NA-83 Gujranwala-V	Chaudhary Zulfiqar Bhindar	PML(N)	1,39,235	55.83	Rana Nazeer Ahmed Khan	PTI	75,940	30.45	63,295	55.07
Punjab	NA-84 Gujranwala-VI	Azhar Qayyum	PML(N)	1,19,612	47.62	Chaudhry Bilal Ijaz	PTI	89,728	35.72	29,884	57.36
Punjab	NA-85 Mandi Bahauddin-I	Haji Imtiaz Ahmad Chaudhary	PTI	99,996	36.65	Chaudhary Mushahid Raza	PML(N)	80,387	29.46	19,609	53.45
Punjab	NA-86 Mandi Bahauddin-II	Nasir Iqbal Bosal	PML(N)	1,47,105	52.15	Nazar Muhammad Gondal	PTI	80,637	28.59	66,468	55.05
Punjab	NA-87 Hafizabad	Chaudhary Shoukat Ali	PTI	1,65,618	40.92	Saira Afzal Tarar	PML(N)	1,57,453	38.90	8,165	59.13
Punjab	NA-88 Sargodha-I	Mukhtar Ahmad Bharath	PML(N)	1,29,615	45.70	Nadeem Afzal Chan	PTI	1,15,622	40.77	13,993	57.11
Punjab	NA-89 Sargodha-II	Mohsin Shahnawaz Ranjha	PML(N)	1,14,245	43.70	Usama Ghias Mela	PTI	1,13,422	43.38	823	58.93
Punjab	NA-90 Sargodha-III	Chaudhry Hamid Hameed	PML(N)	93,948	42.11	Nadia Aziz	PTI	85,220	38.20	8,728	52.97
Punjab	NA-91 Sargodha-IV	Zulfiqar Ali Bhatti	PML(N)	1,10,525	40.59	Chaudhry Aamir Sultan Cheema	PTI	1,10,246	40.49	279	59.46
Punjab	NA-92 Sargodha-V	Syed Javed Hasnain Shah	PML(N)	97,013	36.83	Sahibzada Naeemuddin Sialvi	PTI	65,406	24.83	31,607	56.81
Punjab	NA-93 Khushab-I	Umer Aslam Awan	PTI	1,00,448	40.49	Sumaira Malik	PML(N)	70,401	28.38	30,047	57.86
Punjab	NA-94 Khushab-II	Malik Muhammad Ehsanullah Tiwana	PTI	93,864	39.46	Malik Shakir Bashir Awan	PML(N)	85,109	35.78	8,755	59.49
Punjab	NA-95 Mianwali-I	Imran Khan	PTI	1,63,538	64.67	Haji Obaidullah Khan Shadikhel	PML(N)	50,015	19.78	113,523	54.29
Punjab	NA-96 Mianwali-II	Amjad Ali Khan Niazi	PTI	1,57,422	60.27	Humair Hayat Khan Rokhri	PML(N)	54,909	21.02	102,513	57.95
Punjab	NA-97 Bhakkar-I	Muhammad Sana Ullah Khan Masti Khel	IND	1,20,729	41.82	Abdul Majeed Khan	PML(N)	91,607	31.74	29,122	65.97
Punjab	NA-98 Bhakkar-II	Muhammad Afzal Khan Dhandla	PTI	1,38,307	46.87	Rashid Akbar Khan	IND	1,33,679	45.30	4,628	67.98
Punjab	NA-99 Chiniot-I	Ghulam Muhammad Lali	PTI	81,330	39.33	Ghulam Abbas	IND	64,307	31.10	17,023	55.56
Punjab	NA-100 Chiniot-II	Qaiser Ahmed Sheikh	PML(N)	76,415	34.16	Zulfiqar Ali Shah	PTI	75,559	33.78	856	61.68
Punjab	NA-101 Faisalabad-I	Muhammad Asim Nazir	IND	1,47,812	55.31	Zafar Zulqarnain Sahi	PTI	86,575	32.39	61,237	58.19
Punjab	NA-102 Faisalabad-II	Malik Nawab Sher Waseer	PTI	1,09,708	40.20	Talal Chaudhry	PML(N)	97,869	35.86	11,839	54.67
Punjab	NA-103 Faisalabad-III	Election postponed									
Punjab	NA-104 Faisalabad-IV	Chaudhry Shehbaz Babar	PML(N)	95,099	34.47	Sardar Dildar Ahmed Cheema	PTI	73,320	26.57	21,779	55.88
Punjab	NA-105 Faisalabad-V	Chaudhry Raza Nasrullah Ghumman	PTI	77,862	31.10	Muhammad Masood Nazir	IND	69,211	27.65	8,651	56.84
Punjab	NA-106 Faisalabad-VI	Rana Sanaullah	PML(N)	1,06,319	44.40	Nisar Ahmad Jutt	PTI	1,03,799	43.35	2,520	58.92
Punjab	NA-107 Faisalabad-VII	Khurram Shehzad	PTI	1,26,441	51.41	Akram Ansari	PML(N)	1,02,159	41.54	24,282	57.52
Punjab	NA-108 Faisalabad-VIII	Farrukh Habib	PTI	1,12,740	46.47	Abid Sher Ali	PML(N)	1,11,529	45.98	1,211	57.01
Punjab	NA-109 Faisalabad-IX	Faiz Ullah Kamoka	PTI	1,22,905	51.26	Mian Abdul Manan	PML(N)	94,476	39.40	28,429	58.05
Punjab	NA-110 Faisalabad-X	Raja Riaz Ahmad Khan	PTI	1,14,215	45.76	Rana Afzal Khan	PML(N)	1,08,172	43.34	6,043	57.01
Punjab	NA-111 Toba Tek Singh-I	Chaudhary Khalid Javed	PML(N)	1,10,556	44.84	Usama Hamza	PTI	85,448	34.65	25,108	58.32
Punjab	NA-112 Toba Tek Singh-II	Muhammad Junaid Anwar Chaudhry	PML(N)	1,25,303	45.94	Chaudhary Muhammad Ashfaq	PTI	1,21,031	44.37	4,272	59.22
Punjab	NA-113 Toba Tek Singh-III	Riaz Fatyana	PTI	1,28,274	50.31	Asad Ur Rehman	PML(N)	1,06,018	41.58	22,256	59.90
Punjab	NA-114 Jhang-I	Sahabzada Muhammad Mehboob Sultan	PTI	1,06,043	35.98	Faisal Saleh Hayat	PPP	1,05,454	35.78	589	62.45
Punjab	NA-115 Jhang-II	Ghulam Bibi Bharwana	PTI	91,434	36.01	Muhammad Ahmed Ludhianvi	IND	68,616	27.02	22,818	57.39
Punjab	NA-116 Jhang-III	Muhammad Ameer Sultan	PTI	90,649	32.10	Muhammad Asif Muavia Sial	IND	70,842	25.09	19,807	62.15
Punjab	NA-117 Nankana Sahib-I	Barjees Tahir	PML(N)	71,891	30.74	Tariq Mehmood Bajwa	IND	68,995	29.50	2,896	58.40
Punjab	NA-118 Nankana Sahib-II	Ijaz Shah	PTI	63,918	30.60	Shizra Mansab Ali Khan	PML(N)	61,395	29.39	2,523	58.73
Punjab	NA-119 Sheikhupura-I	Rahat Amanullah	PTI	1,10,231	47.99	Rana Afzaal Hussain	PML(N)	94,072	40.96	16,159	56.04
Punjab	NA-120 Sheikhupura-II	Rana Tanveer Hussain	PML(N)	99,674	46.08	Ali Asghar Manda	PTI	74,165	34.29	25,509	59.35
Punjab	NA-121 Sheikhupura-III	Mian Javed Latif	PML(N)	1,01,622	42.30	Muhammad Saeed Virk	PTI	71,308	29.68	30,314	56.16
Punjab	NA-122 Sheikhupura-IV	Irfan Dogar	PML(N)	96,000	36.43	Ali Salman	PTI	64,616	24.52	31,384	57.83
Punjab	NA-123 Lahore-I	Muhammad Riaz Malik	PML(N)	97,193	47.67	Mehar Wajid Azeem	PTI	72,535	35.58	24,658	51.13
Punjab	NA-124 Lahore-II	Hamza Shahbaz Sharif	PML(N)	1,46,294	57.39	Muhammad Nauman Qaiser	PTI	80,981	31.77	65,313	48.50
Punjab	NA-125 Lahore-III	Waheed Alam Khan	PML(N)	1,22,327	48.88	Yasmin Rashid	PTI	1,05,857	42.30	16,470	52.38
Punjab	NA-126 Lahore-IV	Muhammad Hammad Azhar	PTI	1,05,734	46.30	Mehr Ishtiaq Ahmed	PML(N)	1,02,677	44.96	3,057	52.26
Punjab	NA-127 Lahore-V	Ali Pervaiz Malik	PML(N)	1,13,265	54.16	Jamshed Iqbal Cheema	PTI	66,818	31.95	46,447	50.75
Punjab	NA-128 Lahore-VI	Shaikh Rohale Asghar	PML(N)	98,199	52.49	Chaudhary Ijaz Ahmad Dayal	PTI	52,774	28.21	45,425	55.21
Punjab	NA-129 Lahore-VII	Sardar Ayaz Sadiq	PML(N)	1,03,021	47.98	Aleem Khan	PTI	94,879	44.19	8,142	53.96
Punjab	NA-130 Lahore-VIII	Shafqat Mahmood	PTI	1,27,405	50.51	Khawaja Ahmed Hassan	PML(N)	1,04,625	41.48	22,780	52.99
Punjab	NA-131 Lahore-IX	Imran Khan	PTI	84,313	44.68	Khawaja Saad Rafique	PML(N)	83,633	44.32	680	52.59
Punjab	NA-132 Lahore-X	Shehbaz Sharif	PML(N)	95,834	51.26	Ch Muhammad Mansha Sindhu	PTI	49,093	26.26	46,741	60.45
Punjab	NA-133 Lahore-XI	Muhammad Pervaiz Malik	PML(N)	89,678	47.07	Ejaz Chaudhary	PTI	77,231	40.53	12,447	51.89
Punjab	NA-134 Lahore-XII	Rana Mubashir Iqbal	PML(N)	76,291	53.88	Malik Zaheer Abbas	PTI	45,991	32.48	30,300	53.40
Punjab	NA-135 Lahore-XIII	Malik Karamat Khokhar	PTI	64,765	47.49	Malik Saif ul Malook Khokhar	PML(N)	55,431	40.65	9,334	53.94
Punjab	NA-136 Lahore-XIV	Afzal Khokhar	PML(N)	88,831	54.55	Malik Asad Ali Khokhar	PTI	44,669	27.43	44,162	56.08
Punjab	NA-137 Kasur-I	Saad Waseem Akhtar Sheikh	PML(N)	1,21,207	45.62	Aseff Ahmad Ali	PTI	42,930	16.16	78,277	58.91
Punjab	NA-138 Kasur-II	Malik Rasheed Ahmed Khan	PML(N)	1,09,785	42.36	Rashid Tufail	PTI	78,458	30.27	31,327	62.38
Punjab	NA-139 Kasur-III	Rana Muhammad Ishaq	PML(N)	1,21,767	43.89	Azeemuddin Zahid	PTI	1,12,893	40.69	8,874	59.99
Punjab	NA-140 Kasur-IV	Sardar Talib Hassan Nakai	PTI	1,24,644	44.19	Rana Muhammad Hayat	PML(N)	1,24,395	44.11	249	60.65
Punjab	NA-141 Okara-I	Chaudhry Nadeem Abbas	PML(N)	92,841	35.32	Syed Samsam Bukhari	PTI	60,217	22.91	32,624	60.23
Punjab	NA-142 Okara-II	Chaudhry Riaz-ul-Haq	PML(N)	1,40,733	59.84	Rao Hasan Sikandar	PTI	76,592	32.57	64,141	56.81
Punjab	NA-143 Okara-III	Rao Muhammad Ajmal Khan	PML(N)	142,988	58.06	Syed Gulzar Sibtain Shah	PTI	89,177	36.21	53,811	58.22
Punjab	NA-144 Okara-IV	Muhammad Moeen Wattoo	PML(N)	1,18,670	49.15	Manzoor Wattoo	IND	1,05,585	43.73	13,085	57.42
Punjab	NA-145 Pakpattan-I	Ahmad Raza Maneka	PML(N)	1,18,581	42.34	Muhammad Shah Khagga	PTI	90,683	32.38	27,898	57.62
Punjab	NA-146 Pakpattan-II	Rana Iradat Sharif Khan	PML(N)	1,38,789	46.42	Mian Muhammad Amjad Joya	PTI	1,01,509	33.95	37,280	59.55
Punjab	NA-147 Sahiwal-I	Syed Imran Ahmed	PML(N)	1,20,924	45.77	Nouraiz Shakoor	PTI	86,821	32.87	34,103	56.18
Punjab	NA-148 Sahiwal-II	Chaudhry Muhammad Ashraf	PML(N)	1,29,027	47.85	Malik Muhammad Yar Dhakoo	PTI	87,848	32.58	41,179	56.19
Punjab	NA-149 Sahiwal-III	Rai Muhammad Murtaza Iqbal	PTI	1,40,338	50.17	Chaudhry Muhammad Tufail	PML(N)	1,14,244	40.85	26,144	57.15
Punjab	NA-150 Khanewal-I	Fakhar Imam	IND	1,01,520	45.56	Raza Hayat Hiraj	PTI	92,039	41.30	9,481	59.99
Punjab	NA-151 Khanewal-II	Muhammad Khan Daha	PML(N)	1,11,325	47.54	Ahmad Yar Hiraj	PTI	1,09,796	46.89	1,529	58.72
Punjab	NA-152 Khanewal-III	Zahoor Hussain Qureshi	PTI	1,09,257	47.08	Pir Muhammad Aslam Bodla	PML(N)	99,137	42.72	10,120	59.00
Punjab	NA-153 Khanewal-IV	Chaudhry Iftikhar Nazir	PML(N)	1,06,467	42.95	Malik Ghulam Murtaza	PTI	77,170	31.13	29,297	61.41
Punjab	NA-154 Multan-I	Malik Ahmed Hussain Dehar	PTI	74,220	37.09	Abdul Qadir Gillani	PPP	64,257	32.11	10,021	57.04
Punjab	NA-155 Multan-II	Malik Aamir Dogar	PTI	1,35,872	57.38	Sheikh Tariq Rashid	PML(N)	78,861	33.30	54,856	49.27
Punjab	NA-156 Multan-III	Shah Mehmood Qureshi	PTI	1,16,383	53.17	Amir Saeed Ansari	PML(N)	84,969	38.82	31,414	49.87
Punjab	NA-157 Multan-IV	Zain Qureshi	PTI	77,373	35.25	Ali Musa Gilani	PPP	70,778	32.24	6,595	57.32
Punjab	NA-158 Multan-V	Ibrahim Khan	PTI	83,304	34.43	Yousaf Raza Gillani	PPP	74,443	30.76	8,861	56.76
Punjab	NA-159 Multan-VI	Rana Muhammad Qasim Noon	PTI	1,02,754	45.26	Dewan Muhammad Zulqarnain Bukhari	PML(N)	99,477	43.82	3,232	56.55
Punjab	NA-160 Lodhran-I	Abdul Rehman Khan Kanju	PML(N)	1,25,810	46.97	Muhammad Akhtar Khan Kanju	PTI	1,15,541	43.14	10,261	60.26
Punjab	NA-161 Lodhran-II	Mian Muhammad Shafiq	PTI	1,21,300	46.86	Siddique Khan Baloch	PML(N)	1,16,093	44.85	5,207	57.73
Punjab	NA-162 Vehari-I	Choudhry Faqir Ahmad	PML(N)	81,977	35.59	Ayesha Nazir Jutt	PTI	64,796	28.13	17,181	55.93
Punjab	NA-163 Vehari-II	Syed Sajid Mehdi	PML(N)	70,344	33.16	Ishaq Khan Khakwani	PTI	56,977	26.86	13,367	57.99
Punjab	NA-164 Vehari-III	Tahir Iqbal	PTI	82,213	35.78	Tehmina Daultana	PML(N)	68,250	29.70	13,963	57.66
Punjab	NA-165 Vehari-IV	Aurangzeb Khan Khichi	PTI	99,393	46.45	Saeed Ahmed Khan	PML(N)	65,575	30.64	33,813	56.43
Punjab	NA-166 Bahawalnagar-I	Abdul Ghaffar Wattoo	IND	1,02,385	46.47	Syed Muhammad Asghar Shah	PTI	93,291	42.34	9,094	63.16
Punjab	NA-167 Bahawalnagar-II	Alam Dad Lalika	PML(N)	91,540	43.65	Mumtaz Matyana	PTI	49,772	23.73	41,768	56.94
Punjab	NA-168 Bahawalnagar-III	Ihsan ul Haq Bajwa	PML(N)	1,24,218	54.48	Fatima Tahir Cheema	PTI	74,517	32.68	49,701	57.69
Punjab	NA-169 Bahawalnagar-IV	Noor Ul Hassan Tanvir	PML(N)	91,763	37.03	Ijaz-ul-Haq	PML(Z)	72,461	29.24	19,302	60.34
Punjab	NA-170 Bahawalpur-I	Muhammad Farooq Azam Malik	PTI	84,495	44.81	Baligh Ur Rehman	PML(N)	74,694	39.61	9,801	52.29
Punjab	NA-171 Bahawalpur-II	Riaz Hussain Pirzada	PML(N)	99,202	40.87	Chaudhary Naeemuddin Warraich	PTI	88,297	36.38	10,905	59.95
Punjab	NA-172 Bahawalpur-III	Tariq Bashir Cheema	PML(Q)	1,06,383	46.40	Saud Majeed	PML(N)	1,01,971	44.48	4,412	64.08
Punjab	NA-173 Bahawalpur-IV	Najibuddin Awaisi	PML(N)	86,142	39.43	Khadija Aamir Yar Malik	PTI	60,211	27.56	25,931	56.02
Punjab	NA-174 Bahawalpur-V	Makhdoom Syed Sami Ul Hassan Gillani	PTI	63,884	32.93	Prince Bahawal Abbas Abbasi	IND	58,092	29.94	5,792	52.68
Punjab	NA-175 Rahim Yar Khan-I	Syed Mobeen Ahmed	PTI	97,347	41.03	Khwaja Ghulam Rasool Koreja	PPP	89,292	37.64	8,055	56.66
Punjab	NA-176 Rahim Yar Khan-II	Sheikh Fayyaz Ud Din	PML(N)	78,590	37.19	Mian Ghous Muhammad	PTI	59,937	28.36	18,653	54.90
Punjab	NA-177 Rahim Yar Khan-III	Khusro Bakhtiar	PTI	1,00,804	46.50	Makhdoom Shahabudin	PPP	64,660	29.83	36,144	54.74
Punjab	NA-178 Rahim Yar Khan-IV	Mustafa Mehmood	PPP	93,394	47.29	Muhammad Tariq	PML(N)	51,316	25.99	42,078	56.23
Punjab	NA-179 Rahim Yar Khan-V	Javed Iqbal Warraich	PTI	1,10,877	44.44	Mian Imtiaz Ahmed	PML(N)	88,871	35.62	22,006	56.38
Punjab	NA-180 Rahim Yar Khan-VI	Makhdoom Syed Murtaza Mehmood	PPP	72,062	32.59	Sardar Muhammad Arshad Khan Leghari	PML(N)	55,085	24.91	16,977	57.17
Punjab	NA-181 Muzaffargarh-I	Muhammad Shabir Ali	IND	64,154	32.33	Sultan Mehmood	IND	54,484	27.46	9,670	60.76
Punjab	NA-182 Muzaffargarh-II	Mehr Irshad Ahmed Sial	PPP	53,094	26.84	Jamshed Dasti	ARP	50,618	25.59	2,476	59.12
Punjab	NA-183 Muzaffargarh-III	Raza Rabbani Khar	PPP	54,960	26.86	Mian Fayyaz Hussain Chhajrra	PTI	39,962	19.53	14,998	61.02
Punjab	NA-184 Muzaffargarh-IV	Iftikhar Ahmed Khan Babar	PPP	54,879	27.59	Malik Ahmad Karim Qaswar Langrial	IND	41,753	20.99	13,126	56.00
Punjab	NA-185 Muzaffargarh-V	Syed Basit Sultan Bukhari	IND	94,672	48.11	Muhammad Moazam Ali Khan Jatoi	PTI	73,185	37.19	21,487	58.23
Punjab	NA-186 Muzaffargarh-VI	Sardar Aamir Talal Khan Gopang	PTI	63,564	33.16	Muhammad Dawood Khan	PPP	53,690	28.00	9,866	60.54
Punjab	NA-187 Layyah-I	Abdul Majeed Khan Niazi	PTI	94,477	33.49	Sardar Bahadur Ahmed Khan	IND	88,544	31.39	5,933	63.71
Punjab	NA-188 Layyah-II	Niaz Ahmed Jhakkar	PTI	1,09,854	39.20	Syed Muhammad Saqlain Bukhari	PML(N)	1,03,152	36.81	6,702	64.21
Punjab	NA-189 Dera Ghazi Khan-I	Khawaja Sheraz Mehmood	PTI	78,824	47.14	Sardar Meer Badshah Khan	IND	39,562	23.66	39,262	52.45
Punjab	NA-190 Dera Ghazi Khan-II	Amjad Farooq Khan	IND	72,300	45.72	Zulfiqar Ali Khosa	PTI	72,171	45.64	129	51.74
Punjab	NA-191 Dera Ghazi Khan-III	Zartaj Gul	PTI	79,932	42.97	Awais Ahmad Khan Leghari	PML(N)	54,571	29.34	25,361	50.58
Punjab	NA-192 Dera Ghazi Khan-IV	Sardar Muhammad Khan Laghari	PTI	80,683	50.19	Shehbaz Sharif	PML(N)	67,753	42.15	12,930	54.88
Punjab	NA-193 Rajanpur-I	Sardar Muhammad Jaffar Khan Leghari	PTI	81,358	48.94	Sardar Sher Ali Gorchani	IND	46,748	28.12	32,506	55.76
Punjab	NA-194 Rajanpur-II	Sardar Nasrullah Khan Dreshak	PTI	73,839	42.30	Hafeez-ur-Rehman Dreshak	IND	64,739	37.08	9,100	60.11
Punjab	NA-195 Rajanpur-III	Sardar Riaz Mehmood Khan Mazari	PTI	89,829	53.53	Khizar Hussain Mazari	PML(N)	69,113	41.18	20,716	63.78
Sindh	NA-196 Jacobabad	Muhammad Mian Soomro	PTI	92,274	45.44	Aijaz Hussain Jakhrani	PPP	86,876	42.78	5,398	44.59
Sindh	NA-197 Kashmore	Ehsan ur Rehman Mazari	PPP	84,742	56.50	Shamsher Ali Mazari	MMA	47,326	31.55	37,416	36.37
Sindh	NA-198 Shikarpur-I	Abid Hussain Bhayo	PPP	64,187	44.03	Muhammad Ibraheem Jatoi	IND	44,829	30.75	19,358	50.13
Sindh	NA-199 Shikarpur-II	Ghos Bakhsh Khan Mahar	GDA	62,785	45.82	Zulfiqar Ali Kamario	PPP	55,987	40.86	6,798	49.75
Sindh	NA-200 Larkana-I	Bilawal Bhutto Zardari	PPP	84,426	55.40	Rashid Mehmood Soomro	MMA	50,200	32.94	34,226	48.25
Sindh	NA-201 Larkana-II	Khursheed Ahmed Junejo	PPP	97,051	53.00	Allah Bakhsh Unarr	GDA	69,111	37.74	27,940	52.71
Sindh	NA-202 Qambar Shahdadkot-I	Aftab Shaban Mirani	PPP	72,159	56.39	Nasir Mehmood	MMA	36,046	28.17	36,113	42.72
Sindh	NA-203 Qambar Shahdadkot-II	Mir Aamir Ali Khan Magsi	PPP	80,060	75.96	Sakhawat Ali	PTI	13,008	12.34	67,052	35.96
Sindh	NA-204 Ghotki-I	Sardar Khalid Ahmed Khan Lund	PPP	99,889	48.94	Abdul Haque Alias Mian Mitha	IND	91,752	44.96	8,137	58.47
Sindh	NA-205 Ghotki-II	Ali Mohammad Mahar	IND	71,943	45.48	Ahsanullah Sundrani	PPP	41,843	23.53	30,100	50.46
Sindh	NA-206 Sukkur-I	Syed Khurshid Ahmed Shah	PPP	84,708	52.02	Syed Tahir Hussain Shah	PTI	58,767	36.09	25,941	58.21
Sindh	NA-207 Sukkur-II	Nauman Islam Shaikh	PPP	70,870	42.43	Mobeen Ahmad	PTI	60,531	36.24	10,339	46.56
Sindh	NA-208 Khairpur-I	Nafisa Shah	PPP	1,07,978	62.26	Ghous Ali Shah	GDA	58,203	33.56	49,775	51.15
Sindh	NA-209 Khairpur-II	Fazal Ali Shah	PPP	95,972	54.04	Pir Sadaruddin Shah	GDA	76,073	42.83	19,899	55.98
Sindh	NA-210 Khairpur-III	Syed Javed Ali Shah Jillani	PPP	90,830	49.73	Syed Kazim Ali Shah	GDA	78,606	43.04	12,224	50.26
Sindh	NA-211 Naushahro Feroze-I	Sayed Abrar Ali Shah	PPP	1,10,967	53.58	Allando Shah Alias Zafar All Shah	GDA	80,544	38.89	30,423	55.52
Sindh	NA-212 Naushahro Feroze-II	Zulfiqar Ali Behan	PPP	90,663	46.52	Ghulam Murtaza Khan Jatoi	GDA	84,516	43.37	6,147	54.82
Sindh	NA-213 Nawabshah-I	Asif Ali Zardari	PPP	1,01,362	53.91	Sardar Sher Muhammad Rind Baloch	GDA	54,344	28.90	47,018	46.87
Sindh	NA-214 Nawabshah-II	Syed Gulam Mustafa Shah	PPP	1,10,921	58.99	Syed Zain UI Abdin	SUP	54,697	29.09	56,224	55.84
Sindh	NA-215 Sanghar-I	Naveed Dero	PPP	77,890	47.11	Haji Khuda Bakhsh	GDA	77,322	46.76	568	54.89
Sindh	NA-216 Sanghar-II	Shazia Marri	PPP	80,770	50.80	Kishan Chand Parwani	GDA	70,791	44.52	9,979	57.74
Sindh	NA-217 Sanghar-III	Roshan Din Junejo	PPP	1,03,232	64.93	Mehar Ali Alias Mahi Khan	GDA	43,769	27.53	59,461	47.87
Sindh	NA-218 Mirpur Khas-I	Syed Ali Nawaz Shah Rizvi	IND	75,795	44.39	Pir Hassan Ali Shah	PPP	67,552	39.56	8,243	50.63
Sindh	NA-219 Mirpur Khas-II	Mir Munawar Ali Talpur	PPP	1,05,823	60.26	Arbab Ghulam Rahim	GDA	51,145	29.13	54,678	53.39
Sindh	NA-220 Umerkot	Nawab Muhammad Yousuf	PPP	1,63,287	59.35	Shah Mehmood Qureshi	PTI	1,04,376	37.94	58,911	62.06
Sindh	NA-221 Tharparkar-I	Pir Noor Muhammad Shah Jeelani	PPP	80,047	50.46	Shah Mehmood Qureshi	PTI	72,884	45.94	6,971	68.68
Sindh	NA-222 Tharparkar-II	Mahesh Kumar Malani	PPP	1,06,630	47.91	Arbab Zakaullah	GDA	87,251	39.20	19,379	70.91
Sindh	NA-223 Matiari	Makhdoom Jameeluz Zaman	PPP	1,09,960	61.25	Makhdoom Fazal Hussain Qureshi	GDA	50,366	28.06	59,594	54.06
Sindh	NA-224 Tando Allahyar	Zulfiqar Sattar Bachani	PPP	97,147	51.26	Muhammad Mohsin	GDA	70,914	37.42	26,233	54.05
Sindh	NA-225 Hyderabad-I	Syed Hussain Tariq	PPP	81,983	58.38	Khawand Bakhsh Ghulam Muhammad	PTI	50,968	36.30	31,015	48.10
Sindh	NA-226 Hyderabad-II	Sabir Hussain Qaimkhani	MQM	46,646	32.01	Jamshaid Ali Shaikh	PTI	38,672	26.54	7,974	39.59
Sindh	NA-227 Hyderabad-III	Salahuddin	MQM	52,053	35.85	Muhammad Hakim	PTI	41,513	28.59	10,540	39.89
Sindh	NA-228 Tando Muhammad Khan	Naveed Qamar	PPP	76,067	54.30	Mir Ali Nawaz Talpur	GDA	45,159	32.24	30,908	53.51
Sindh	NA-229 Badin-I	Mir Ghulam Ali Talpur	PPP	96,977	49.66	Muhammad Hassam Mirza	GDA	81,828	41.91	15,149	52.96
Sindh	NA-230 Badin-II	Fehmida Mirza	GDA	96,875	47.01	Rasool Bakhsh Chandio	PPP	96,015	46.60	860	58.17
Sindh	NA-231 Sujawal	Syed Ayaz Ali Shah Sheerazi	PPP	1,29,980	85.05	Maulvi Muhammad Saleh Alhadad	MMA	11,177	7.32	1,18,803	45.89
Sindh	NA-232 Thatta	Shamasunnisa	PPP	1,52,691	83.67	Arslan Bakhsh Brohi	PTI	18,900	10.36	1,33,791	43.41
Sindh	NA-233 Jamshoro	Sikander Ali Rahupoto	PPP	1,33,492	58.19	Syed Jalal Mehmood	SUP	81,289	35.43	52,203	56.35
Sindh	NA-234 Dadu-I	Irfan Zafar Leghari	PPP	96,038	52.84	Liaquat Ali Jatoi	PTI	82,730	45.52	13,308	50.41
Sindh	NA-235 Dadu-II	Rafiq Ahmed Jamali	PPP	81,200	47.93	Karim Ali Jatoi	PTI	63,008	37.19	18,192	49.67
Sindh	NA-236 Karachi Malir-I	Jam Abdul Karim Bijar	PPP	66,623	56.73	Masroor Ali	PTI	26,456	22.53	40,167	50.40
Sindh	NA-237 Karachi Malir-II	Jamil Ahmed Khan	PTI	33,289	27.78	Abdul Hakeem Baloch	PPP	31,907	26.63	1,382	42.23
Sindh	NA-238 Karachi Malir-III	Syed Rafiullah	PPP	29,598	28.67	Awrangzib Faruqi	PRHP	19,463	18.86	10,135	44.00
Sindh	NA-239 Karachi Korangi-I	Muhammad Akram	PTI	69,147	30.84	Khuwaja Sohail Mansoor	MQM	68,811	30.69	336	42.41
Sindh	NA-240 Karachi Korangi-II	Iqbal Muhammad Ali Khan	MQM	61,165	34.41	Muhammad Asif Ansari	TLP	30,535	17.18	30,630	37.38
Sindh	NA-241 Karachi Korangi-III	Faheem Khan	PTI	26,706	23.41	Muhammad Moin Aamir Pirzada	MQM	23,873	20.93	2,833	36.28
Sindh	NA-242 Karachi East-I	Saifur Rehman	PTI	27,333	38.65	Muhammad Iqbal Sand	PPP	11,823	16.72	15,510	38.56
Sindh	NA-243 Karachi East-II	Imran Khan	PTI	91,373	56.05	Syed Ali Raza Abidi	MQM	24,082	14.77	67,291	41.14
Sindh	NA-244 Karachi East-III	Ali Haider Zaidi	PTI	69,475	40.70	Miftah Ismail	PML(N)	31,247	18.30	38,228	41.91
Sindh	NA-245 Karachi East-IV	Aamir Liaquat Hussain	PTI	56,664	33.96	Farooq Sattar	MQM	35,429	21.23	21,235	37.62
Sindh	NA-246 Karachi South-I	Abdul Shakoor Shad	PTI	52,750	25.97	Ahmed	TLP	42,345	20.85	10,405	38.49
Sindh	NA-247 Karachi South-II	Arif Alvi	PTI	91,020	42.05	Syed Zaman Ali Shah Jaffery	TLP	24,680	11.40	66,340	40.27
Sindh	NA-248 Karachi West-I	Abdul Qadir Patel	PPP	35,124	28.89	Sardar Abdul Aziz	PTI	34,101	28.04	1,023	41.11
Sindh	NA-249 Karachi West-II	Faisal Vawda	PTI	35,344	27.50	Shehbaz Sharif	PML(N)	34,626	26.95	718	39.58
Sindh	NA-250 Karachi West-III	Attaullah Niazi	PTI	36,049	24.57	Fayyaz Qaimkhani	MQM	29,086	19.82	6,963	37.40
Sindh	NA-251 Karachi West-IV	Syed Aminul Haque	MQM	56,888	32.62	Muhammad Aslam	PTI	33,462	19.19	23,426	43.81
Sindh	NA-252 Karachi West-V	Aftab Jehangir	PTI	21,065	24.92	Abdul Kadir Khanzada	MQM	17,858	21.12	3,207	39.61
Sindh	NA-253 Karachi Central-I	Usama Qadri	MQM	52,426	34.48	Muhammad Ashraf Jabbar	PTI	39,145	25.75	13,281	38.12
Sindh	NA-254 Karachi Central-II	Muhammad Aslam Khan	PTI	75,702	38.61	Sheikh Salahuddin	MQM	48,813	24.90	26,889	39.20
Sindh	NA-255 Karachi Central-III	Khalid Maqbool Siddiqui	MQM	59,807	34.72	Mahmood Moulvi	PTI	50,352	29.23	9,455	37.91
Sindh	NA-256 Karachi Central-IV	Najeeb Haroon	PTI	89,850	45.18	Aamir Chishti	MQM	45,575	22.92	44,275	41.25
Balochistan	NA-257 Killa Saifullah-cum-Zhob-cum-Sherani	Maulana Abdul Wasay	MMA	43,851	37.17	Allah Noor	PMAP	22,446	19.03	21,405	46.86
Balochistan	NA-258 Loralai-cum-Musakhel-cum-Ziarat-cum-Duki-cum-Harnai	Muhammad Israr Tareen	BAP	42,938	27.08	Ameer Zaman	MMA	38,457	24.25	4,481	52.68
Balochistan	NA-259 Dera Bugti-cum-Kohlu-cum-Barkhan-cum-Sibbi-cum- Lehri	Nawabzada Shahzain Bugti	JWP	22,787	15.43	Mir Tariq Mehmood Khan Khetran	IND	21,213	14.37	1,574	44.79
Balochistan	NA-260 Nasirabad-cum-Kachhi-cum-Jhal Magsi	Khalid Hussain Magsi	BAP	53,330	41.14	Yar Muhammad Rind	PTI	40,188	31.01	13,142	39.14
Balochistan	NA-261 Jafarabad-cum-Sohbatpur	Mir Khan Muhammad Jamali	PTI	45,222	40.89	Mir Changez Khan Jamali	PPP	27,563	24.92	17,659	38.89
Balochistan	NA-262 Pishin	Kamaluddin	MMA	50,258	42.83	Muhammad Isa Khan	PMAP	28,344	24.16	21,914	47.87
Balochistan	NA-263 Killa Abdullah	Maulana Salahuddin Ayyubi	MMA	37,971	41.26	Asghar Khan Achakzai	ANP	21,417	23.27	16,554	41.03
Balochistan	NA-264 Quetta-I	Maulvi Asmatullah	MMA	14,887	22.12	Abdul Wali Kakar	BNP(M)	10,071	14.97	4,816	39.77
Balochistan	NA-265 Quetta-II	Qasim Khan Suri	PTI	25,973	22.64	Lashkari Raisani	BNP(M)	20,389	17.77	5,584	36.79
Balochistan	NA-266 Quetta-III	Agha Hassan Baloch	BNP(M)	20,034	32.55	Hafiz Hussain Ahmed	MMA	11,057	17.97	8,977	34.30
Balochistan	NA-267 Mastung-cum-Shaheed Sikandarabad-cum-Kalat	Syed Mehmood Shah	MMA	26,645	24.04	Manzoor Ahmed Baloch	BNP(M)	25,738	23.22	907	48.66
Balochistan	NA-268 Chagai-cum-Nushki-cum-Kharan	Muhammad Hashim	BNP(M)	14,435	31.23	Usman Badini	MMA	12,272	26.55	2,163	20.58
Balochistan	NA-269 Khuzdar	Akhtar Mengal	BNP(M)	52,875	46.52	Muhammad Khalid Bizenjo	BAP	19,720	17.35	33,155	54.32
Balochistan	NA-270 Panjgur-cum-Washuk-cum-Awaran	Ehsanullah Reki	BAP	18,568	21.19	Muhammad Hanif	BNP(A)	16,040	18.30	2,528	40.48
Balochistan	NA-271 Kech	Zubaida Jalal Khan	BAP	33,456	38.81	Syed Ehsan Shah	BNP(A)	20,617	23.92	12,839	39.92
Balochistan	NA-272 Lasbela-cum-Gawadar	Mohammad Aslam Bhutani	IND	68,804	36.32	Jam Kamal Khan	BAP	63,275	33.40	5,529	56.02

=== Province wise results ===
==== Khyber Pakhtunkhwa (51) ====
PTI(37)	PML(N)(3)	MMA(7)	PPP(1)	ANP(1)	IND(2)

==== Islamabad Capital Territory (3) ====
PTI(3)

==== Punjab (141) ====
PML(N)(62)	PTI(61)	PPP(6)	PML(Q)(4)	AML(1)	IND(7)

==== Sindh (61) ====
PPP(37)	PTI(15)	MQM-P(6)	GDA(2)	IND(1)

==== Balochistan (16) ====
MMA(5)	PTI(2)	BAP(4)	BNP(M)(3)	JWP(1)	IND(1)

== Government formation ==
Despite rejecting the results of the election due to alleged rigging, the Pakistan Muslim League (N) made the decision to take oath in the elected assemblies for the sake of democracy, conceding that Pakistan Tehreek-e-Insaf's Imran Khan was likely to be the Prime Minister. Hence, the government formation at the federal level was left to the PTI alone.

Talks began with smaller parties and independents to form a government. Muttahida Qaumi Movement which won six seats, Pakistan Muslim League (Q) which won four, Balochistan Awami Party which won four, Grand Democratic Alliance which won two, and thirteen independent candidates were invited to join the PTI-led government. Additionally, Awami Muslim League led by Sheikh Rasheed Ahmed, the party's only MNA, had already vowed its support to PTI before the elections.

On 28 July, PML (Q) pledged its support to PTI's candidates for Chief Minister of Punjab, making it unlikely to oppose PTI in the National Assembly. On 31 July, Balochistan Awami Party announced its support for a PTI led federal government.

On 1 August, Muttahida Qaumi Movement was told by the PPP that it had to choose between sitting in a coalition with them in Sindh or sitting in a coalition with PTI in the centre. On the same day, MQM-P convener Khalid Maqbool Siddiqui announced the party's six MNAs would lend their support to the PTI in the National Assembly.

On 2 August, Pakistan Muslim League (N), Pakistan Peoples Party, Muttahida Majlis-e-Amal and Awami National Party announced to form a "Grand Opposition Alliance" whereby the Speaker, Prime Minister and other key posts would be jointly nominated and elected. The Speakership would be given to the PPP, the Deputy Speakership to the MMA and the Premiership to the PML(N). However, on 16 August, after the elections for speaker, PPP decided to withdraw their support for Shehbaz Sharif for the post of Prime Minister, owing to previous statements made by the individual about the party's co-chairman and ex-President of Pakistan, Asif Ali Zardari.

Over the next few weeks, other parties pledged their support towards the PTI nominees for speaker, deputy speaker. These parties include Balochistan National Party (Mengal), Grand Democratic Alliance and Jamhoori Watan Party. In addition to this, 9 independents joined the party.

=== Election for Speakers of the National Assembly ===
The election for the Speaker and Deputy Speaker of the National Assembly took place on 15 August 2018.

Candidate	Party	Contesting for	Votes Obtained
Required majority →			172 out of 342
Asad Qaiser	PTI	Speaker	176
Qasim Suri	PTI	Deputy Speaker of the National Assembly of Pakistan	183
Khurshid Shah	PPP; JUI (F)	Speaker	146
Asad Mehmood	PPP; JUI (F)	Deputy Speaker	144

=== Election for Prime Minister ===
The election for Prime Minister took place on 17 August 2018.

←2017	17 August 2018	2022→
Candidate	Party	Votes Obtained
Required majority →		172 out of 342
Imran Khan	PTI	176
Shehbaz Sharif	PMLN	96
Abstentions		53

== Reactions ==
=== Domestic ===
As the results began to pour in, many of the main opposition parties declared that the elections were not 'free and fair'.

The Election Commission of Pakistan denied the allegations but announced that it would be willing to investigate if proof was provided.

PTI chairman Imran Khan also addressed the allegations in his first national address and said that he would be willing to look into any allegations of rigging. He also added that he thought that the elections were the "cleanest in Pakistan's history".

Celebrations across Pakistan also erupted as early results indicated a win for the PTI. Khan's fellow cricketers and celebrities took to Twitter in celebration of his assumed victory even before election results were finalized or a government formed.

=== Economic ===
The Pakistan Stock Exchange (PSX) reacted positively and opened 2% higher as the prospect of a hung government dissipated. The KSE index closed 749 points higher on Thursday. On 3 July 2018, the benchmark KSE-100 index gained 314 points to reach 43,100 points. It closed up 770 points at 43,556 points. The US dollar shed Rs5.36 against the rupee in the inter-bank market for the first time in four years, falling to Rs122.5. The positive economic indicators are considered to be largely driven by what investors consider the return of political stability following the polls.

== See also ==
- 2018 Pakistani general election in Islamabad
- 2018 Pakistani general election violence
- 2018 Punjab provincial election
- 2018 Sindh provincial election
- 2018 Khyber Pakhtunkhwa provincial election
- 2018 Balochistan provincial election
- 2020 Gilgit-Baltistan Assembly election
- 2022 Pakistan By Elections
