= Sajid Khan Mohmand =

Pakistani politician

- ساجد خان مہمند

Member of the National Assembly of Pakistan
- Incumbent
- Assumed office 29 February 2024
- Constituency: NA-26 Mohmand
- In office 13 August 2018 – 20 January 2023
- Constituency: NA-42 (Tribal Area-III)

Personal details
- Party: PTI (2018-present)

Sajid Khan Mohmand (ساجد خان مہمند) is a Pakistani politician who has been a member of the National Assembly of Pakistan, since 29 February 2024. He previously served as a member from August 2018 till January 2023.

== Political career ==
He was elected to the National Assembly of Pakistan as a candidate of Pakistan Tehreek-e-Insaf (PTI) from Constituency NA-42 (Tribal Area-III) in the 2018 Pakistani general election. He received 22,717 votes and defeated Bilal Rehman.

== More Reading ==
- List of members of the 15th National Assembly of Pakistan
