= Rai Mujtaba Kharal =

Pakistani politician

Rai Ghulam Mujtaba Kharral

Member of the National Assembly of Pakistan
- In office 2008–2013
- Constituency: NA-143 (Okara-I)

Personal details
- Born: 25 May 1955 Okara, Punjab, Pakistan
- Died: 12 August 2026 (aged 71) Okara, Punjab, Pakistan
- Party: Pakistan Peoples Party (2002-2026)
- Education: Forman Christian College, Lahore
- Occupation: Politician.

Rai Ghulam Mujtaba Kharral (25 May 1955 - 12 August 2026) was a Pakistani politician who was a member of the National Assembly of Pakistan from 2008 to 2013.

== Political career ==
He ran for the seat of the National Assembly of Pakistan from Constituency NA-143 (Okara-I) as a candidate of Pakistan Peoples Party (PPP) in the 2002 Pakistani general election, but was unsuccessful. He received 39,301 votes and lost the seat to Rai Muhammad Aslam Khan, a candidate of Pakistan Muslim League (Q) (PML-Q).

He was elected to the National Assembly from Constituency NA-143 (Okara-I) as a candidate of PPP in the 2008 Pakistani general election. He received 63,960 votes and defeated Muhammad Aslam Khan Kharral, a candidate of PML-Q.

In 2013, his National Assembly membership was suspended due to dual nationality.
