= Chaudhry Nadeem Abbas =

Pakistani politician

- چوہدری ندیم عباس

Member of the National Assembly of Pakistan
- Incumbent
- Assumed office 29 February 2024
- Constituency: NA-135 Okara-I
- In office 13 August 2018 – 10 August 2023
- Constituency: NA-141 (Okara-I)
- In office 1 June 2013 – 31 May 2018
- Constituency: NA-143 (Okara-I)

Personal details
- Born: 16 December 1970 (age 55) Okara, Punjab, Pakistan
- Party: PMLN (2013-present)

Chaudhry Nadeem Abbas Rebaira (Urdu: ندیم عباس ربیرہ; born 16 December 1970) is a Pakistani politician who has been a member of the National Assembly of Pakistan since February 2024 and previously served in this position from August 2018 till August 2023 and from June 2013 to May 2018. He was also a member of the Provincial Assembly of the Punjab from 2008 to 2013.

== Early life and education ==
Abbas was born on 16 December 1970 in Okara. He received a Bachelor of Arts degree in 2005 from the University of the Punjab.

== Political career ==
Abbas served as Tehsil Nazim of Okara. He ran for the seat of the Provincial Assembly of the Punjab as an independent candidate from Constituency PP-153 (Okara-I) in the 1997 Pakistani general election but was unsuccessful. He received 15,488 votes and lost the seat to Syed Ghulam Mohi-ud-Din Shah, a candidate of Pakistan Muslim League (N) (PML-N).

He was elected to the Provincial Assembly of the Punjab as a candidate of Pakistan Muslim League (Q) (PML-Q) from Constituency PP-189 (Okara-V) in the 2008 Pakistani general election. He received 33,298 votes and defeated Rao Khalid Khan, a candidate of Pakistan Peoples Party (PPP).

He was elected to the National Assembly of Pakistan as a candidate of PML-N from Constituency NA-143 (Okara-I) in the 2013 Pakistani general election. He received 90,652 votes and defeated Rai Muhammad Aslam Kharal, a candidate of PML-Q.

In October 2017, he was appointed as Federal Parliamentary Secretary for information technology and telecommunication. He was re-elected to the National Assembly as a candidate of PML-N from Constituency NA-141 (Okara-I) in the 2018 Pakistani general election.

He was re-elected to the National Assembly as a candidate of PML-N from NA-135 Okara-I in the 2024 Pakistani general election. He received 129,281 votes and defeated Malik Muhammad Akram Bhatti, an independent candidate supported by Pakistan Tehreek-e-Insaf (PTI).
