= Free and Fair Election Network =

- Abbreviation: FAFEN
- Formation: 2006; 20 years ago
- Type: Nonprofit organization
- Headquarters: Islamabad, Pakistan
- Secretary General: Hameedullah Khan Kakar
- Website: fafen.org

Free and Fair Election Network (FAFEN) is the first-ever network of civil society networks in Pakistan dedicated to strengthening democracy through methodically-enacted observation and oversight of electoral, parliamentary, and governance processes. As many as 20 regional networks of over 500 tehsil-level civil society organizations are part of FAFEN, establishing its unmatched outreach to communities of people belonging to all classes, ethnicities, and religions across Pakistan. FAFEN’s work since its inception in 2006, has made it one of the most credible voices in the country for responsive, transparent, accountable, and efficient electoral, legislative, and local governance. FAFEN has observed the General Elections in 2008, 2013 and 2018, local government elections in 2015, and legislative assembly elections in Gilgit-Baltistan in 2009 and 2015, with active support of its partner organizations as well as duly accreditation from the Election Commission of Pakistan (ECP). FAFEN has earned an excellent reputation among various stakeholders, including the Election Commission of Pakistan (ECP) and National Database and Registration Authority (NADRA) and has been recognized as an authentic organization among political parties, civil society organizations, international community, academia, and the media. After the general elections in 2013 various political parties leveled multiple charges of rigging, on which the Supreme Court of Pakistan had formed a Judicial Commission to investigate the matter. FAFEN was the only civil society organization, which was summoned by the Supreme Court of Pakistan to share its election observation findings.

== Citizens’ Observation for Electoral Transparency ==
FAFEN has trained and mobilized hundreds and thousands of citizens to observe various processes of elections in Pakistan. During elections, the trained and non-partisan citizen election observers report back various processes of the election on a specified format.

=== General Elections 2008 ===
To observe the general election in 2008, FAFEN began training long-term observer coordinators in 264 (out of 272) National Assembly constituencies in September 2007. FAFEN's observation of February 18, 2008 general election was helped by the Election Commission of Pakistan (ECP) which accredited 20,000 domestic national election observers to observe all processes of the election all over the country. The Network's strategy was for 16,000 paired stationary observers to monitor a random sample of about 8,000 (out of 64,000) polling stations all day, collecting detailed information about voting, counting, and compilation of results. On the Election-Day, thousands of Pakistani men and women observed female and male polling booths and stations using a tailored manual and reporting format. An additional 4,000 mobile observers visited as many as 30,000 polling stations, making the 2008 national and provincial assembly elections the most closely watched in Pakistani history, despite widespread security concerns and enormous logistical obstacles.

=== Gilgit-Baltistan Legislative Assembly (GBLA) Elections 2009 ===
FAFEN observed Gilgit-Baltistan Legislative Assembly (GBLA) on November 12, 2009, that was characterized by weak electoral administration, procedural irregularities, erroneous voter lists, and heavy government interference. The competitive election campaign, however, offered fairly equal opportunities to all political and independent contestants. FAFEN deployed 22 trained constituency coordinators and 150 election day observers to observe the Gilgit-Baltistan polls. Trained FAFEN observers visited more than 600 of 1,022 polling stations (59%) to observe the voting and counting processes on election day.

=== General Elections 2013 ===
FAFEN observed General Elections 2013 with more than 40,000 citizen observers and issued three short statements on the Election-Day, May 11, and a preliminary statement and report the day after the elections. FAFEN's final analysis was based on the aggregation of comprehensive checklists filled by hand on Election-Day in a statistically-valid random sample of 9,160 polling stations by more than 25,000 static observers and about 15,000 additional mobile observers each visiting two to four polling stations.

FAFEN's final analysis also depended on the extent to which the Election Commission of Pakistan transparently released official forms from all 69,801 polling stations and all 272 National Assembly (NA) constituencies across Pakistan, as urged by both FAFEN and the European Union Election Observation Mission (EUEOM) in public statements.

=== Local Government Elections 2015 ===
The Election Commission of Pakistan established a total of 63,860 polling stations for the local government elections 2015 in Islamabad Capital Territory (ICT), Khyber Pakhtunkhwa (KP), Punjab and Sindh. FAFEN was able to observe 14,050 (22 percent) of these polling stations – 8,318 in Punjab, 3,212 in Sindh, 2,334 in KP and 186 in ICT. The observers recorded 139,127 irregularities and illegalities in the observed polling stations – averaging 10 violations per polling station. The scope of observation was divided into themes and distinct indicators.

=== General Election 2018 ===
More than 16,000 citizen observers were deployed on July 25, 2018, when the country held its 11th General Election (GE) in a politically fragmented environment. FAFEN deployed trained, non-partisan citizen observers to observe voting and counting processes at 85% (or 72,089) of all polling stations in 272 National Assembly constituencies. The observation also enabled a better understanding of citizens of otherwise complex electoral processes and procedures and help them form independent opinions about the electoral outcomes as the country witnessed the second consecutive peaceful democratic transition of power. GE-2018 was unique as it was the first time a legal provision protected the rights of domestic and international observers to have access to polling stations, counting of votes and consolidation of election results – a point of advocacy that FAFEN held since General Elections in 2008. The electoral reforms enacted in 2017 translated into a more responsive Election Commission of Pakistan, which unlike previous elections, efficiently processed accreditation of FAFEN observers.

It was FAFEN's observers who raised alarm bells from 80 neighborhoods in Khyber Pakhtunkhwa, Balochistan, Punjab and Sindh where women were barred from voting. Timely reporting by FAFEN prompted ECP to take immediate actions in these areas to ensure women were allowed to vote. A small step forward but the GE-2018 did not have any incident of 0% percent turnout at any female polling stations unlike 2013 when there were 595 polling stations and 564 in 2008 where no women turned out to vote. This was one of several meaningful remedial actions that ECP had initiated on FAFEN's reporting, establishing the efficacy of the coordination mechanism that was specially set up by the Election Commission of Pakistan for FAFEN to share its observation findings and reports. FAFEN's Election-Day observation was particularly significant in terms of contributing to political stability after most political parties raised concerns at the result management process, alleging that the election outcomes were rigged. The pre-election and election-day reports did not only quantify the scale of irregularities but also indicated their material effect on the election outcome, shifting the focus of divisive political discourse from generalized statements on the quality of election to more technical areas that needed greater scrutiny.

== Development Technologies ==
Tapping the potential of the latest technology to boost innovations and transfer information efficiently, we have mastered the art of developing indigenous information systems and mobile applications to improve the operational capability of our organization as well as our partners. Such innovative solutions also assist us in sharing real-time data with state institutions such as the Election Commission of Pakistan and the National Database and Registration Authority (NADRA) and with our partner organizations for effective implementation of activities in the field.

=== Election Pakistan Portal ===
Trust for Democratic Education and Accountability - FAFEN managed to collect Pakistani elections data from 1970 to-date from credible and authentic sources. The purpose of developing such a unique and user-friendly portal was the unavailability of consolidated election-related information at a single forum. Trust for Democratic Education and Accountability - FAFEN makes this information online and accessible to everyone and formed the country's most comprehensive election history portal electionpakistan.com. The portal has been designed to provide reliable and up-to-date election information for the users to draw self-analysis of the election data, cross-examine candidates’ data with the constituencies, statistical data, and other election-related reports and publications.

The portal provides complete data of National and Provincial Assemblies’ elections, including the by-elections held between 1970 and to-date. The election portal also provides a complete list of the contesting candidates since 1970. Every user can easily search the election records of more than 62,506 candidates in it. Besides, the portal has the scalability to synchronize the candidates’ election records that reflect the election records of contesting candidates. The portal also contains the records of more than 7,300 unique constituencies of National & Provincial Assemblies.

=== Election Information Management System (EIMS) ===
Trust for Democratic Education and Accountability - Free and Fair Election Network carried out the largest election observation in General Elections 2013, over 43,000 mobile and statics trained independent observers were deployed across the country. As part of the institutional capacity building and strengthening the transparency of the election process in Pakistan, FAFEN indigenously designed user-friendly Election Information Management System (EIMS) helped TDEA - FAFEN secretariat to manage the enormous elections data in a professional manner. EIMS aimed to increase the public trust in the conduct and quality of the elections in the country through real-time election monitoring and dissemination of election-related information.

Trust for Democratic Education and Accountability - FAFEN secretariat was able to receive and manage the all phase's observation data such as incidents, reports, interviews and profiling of contesting candidates, interviews with voters, interviews with election officials and officers of the district administration, profiling of District Coordinators, constituency Coordinators and Election Day observers, deployment plans of election day observers, election day reporting sheets and election day result management. To process huge amount of accreditation cards for Election Day observer TDEA - FAFEN IT team deployed another module which only deals with the processing of accreditations cards not only for its own over 43,000 election observers but also cards for other domestic and international mission and local and international media at Secretariat of Election Commission of Pakistan. With the passage of time FAFEN update the Election Information Management System (EIMS) and used in recent General Elections 2018. As part of EIMS, TDEA-FAFEN developed an android-based mobile and web-based application for observers for reporting on the election-day. Only the profiled users were able to log-in through their National Identity Card (NIC) numbers. As many as 21,000 profiled users were registered with the system while 18,865 users submitted their reports to TDEA - FAFEN Secretariat through the online facility. Through this application, TDEA - FAFEN received the observation data from 37,001 out of 85,000 polling stations from across the country on election day.

=== Open Parliament Portal ===
Trust for Democratic Education and Accountability - Free and Fair Election Network has been observing the proceedings of the National Assembly and Senate since 2008 and all Provincial Legislatures since 2011. Every sitting of Lower and Upper Houses of Parliament is directly observed, with objective observation data disseminated among relevant stakeholders in the form of daily factsheets (produced within two hours after the end of each sitting), analytical reports, press releases and recommendations to improve parliamentary processes. Trust for Democratic Education and Accountability - FAFEN follows the same methodology for the legislatures of Punjab, Sindh, Khyber Pakhtunkhwa, and Balochistan.

In order to share the huge observation data set with the public, TDEA - FAFEN has designed an online portal called “OpenParliament.pk”. The website covers all facets of legislative information, including data about the past and ongoing proceedings of each assembly, as well as performance scorecards and reported assets and liabilities of national and provincial elected representatives.

== Legislative Governance ==
The Free and Fair Election Network (FAFEN) has been conducting unique parliamentary observation since 2008, bridging the gap between elected Houses and citizens to inculcate an informed public and political discourse on various aspects of legislative governance in Pakistan. The observation tools and methodology, which were piloted in the National Assembly (Lower House of the national parliament) in 2008, was scaled up to cover the Senate (Upper House of the national parliament) in 2011 and Provincial Assemblies of all provinces in 2012. FAFEN's systematic observation of on-floor proceedings of the elected Houses assesses their performance on the parameters of Participation, Output, Representation, Responsiveness, Transparency, Accessibility, and Order & Institutionalization. Based on the respective rules of business and procedures of each elected House, the observation checklists have been designed in a way that helps generate quantitative information as the level of participation (both in terms of time and quality) of legislators and quantities information is being taken up in the form of motions, resolutions and other interjections. The systematic observation allows the generation of daily, sessional, annual and thematic reports as well as performance scorecards of 1,174 legislators on Open Parliament web portal (www.openparliament.pk). The repository includes profiles and performance details of 104 Senators, 342 Members of National Assembly (MNAs) and 728 Members of four Provincial Assemblies (MPAs) along with their nomination papers and Statements of Assets and Liabilities submitted to the Election Commission of Pakistan. The observation information, available on the Open Parliament web portal, enables citizens, media, civil society, and other relevant stakeholders to access and appraise the performance of elected bodies and their representatives.
