= NA-147 Khanewal-IV =

Constituency of the National Assembly of Pakistan

- Constituency for the National Assembly of Pakistan
- Region: Khanewal Tehsil (partly) and Jahanian Tehsil of Khanewal District
- Electorate: 498,090

Current constituency
- Party: Pakistan Muslim League (N)
- Member: Chaudhry Iftikhar Nazir
- Created from: NA-159 Khanewal-IV

NA-147 Khanewal-IV (این اے-147، خانیوال-۴) is a constituency for the National Assembly of Pakistan, located in the Khanewal District of Punjab

== Election 2002 ==
General elections were held on 10 October 2002. Malik Ghulam Murtaza of PML-Q won by 80,688 votes.

General election 2002: NA-159 Khanewal-IV
Party	Candidate	Votes	%	±%
PML(Q)	Malik Ghulam Murtaza Metla	80,688	50.38	
PPP	Chaudhry Iftikhar Nazir	74,209	46.34	
Independent	Ch. Abid Rizwan Shaukat	2,972	1.86	
MMA	Akhtar Hussain Gil	2,149	1.34	
Independent	Ch. Muhammad Nasar Ullah	132	0.08	
Turnout		162,752	54.68	
Total valid votes		160,150	98.40	
Rejected ballots		2,602	1.60	
Majority		6,479	4.04	
Registered electors		297,622		

== Election 2008 ==
General elections were held on 18 February 2008. Chaudhry Iftikhar Nazir of PPP won by 78,225 votes.

General election 2008: NA-159 Khanewal-IV
Party	Candidate	Votes	%	±%
PPP	Chaudhry Iftikhar Nazir	78,255	50.62	
PML(Q)	Malik Ghulam Murtaza Metla	61,188	39.58	
PML(N)	Rao Abid Rizwan Shoukat	10,417	6.74	
Others	Others (three candidates)	4,729	3.06	
Turnout		158,490	62.61	
Total valid votes		154,589	97.54	
Rejected ballots		3,901	2.46	
Majority		17,067	11.04	
Registered electors		253,131		
PPP gain from PML(Q)				

== Election 2013 ==
General elections were held on 11 May 2013. Chaudhry Iftikhar Nazir of PML-N won by 116,903 votes and became the member of National Assembly.

General election 2013: NA-159 Khanewal-IV
Party	Candidate	Votes	%	±%
PML(N)	Chaudhry Iftikhar Nazir	116,903	58.69	
PTI	Malik Ghulam Murtaza Metla	68,114	34.20	
Others	Others (fourteen candidates)	14,170	7.11	
Turnout		204,650	63.76	
Total valid votes		199,187	97.33	
Rejected ballots		5,463	2.67	
Majority		48,789	24.49	
Registered electors		320,985		
PML(N) gain from PPP				

== Election 2018 ==
General elections were held on 25 July 2018.

General election 2018: NA-153 Khanewal-IV
Party	Candidate	Votes	%	±%
PML(N)	Chaudhry Iftikhar Nazir	106,467	43.02	
PTI	Malik Ghulam Murtaza	77,170	31.13	
Independent	Muhammad Sohail Zaman Shah	52,485	21.17	
TLP	Ghulam Abbas	7,146	2.88	
Independent	Aurangzeb Alamgir	3,356	1.35	
Pakistan Kissan Ittehad (Ch.Anwar)	Muhammad Anwar	653	0.26	
Independent	Atta Ur Rehman	596	0.24	
Turnout		252,362	61.42	
Total valid votes		247,873	98.22	
Rejected ballots		4,489	1.78	
Majority		29,297	11.82	
Registered electors		410,891		

== Election 2024 ==
General elections were held on 8 February 2024. Chaudhry Iftikhar Nazir won the election with 107,933 votes.

General election 2024: NA-147 Khanewal-IV
Party	Candidate	Votes	%	±%
PML(N)	Chaudhry Iftikhar Nazir	107,933	38.63	▼4.39
PTI	Naveed Hameed (Note: Filed nomination papers as PTI candidate but ECP allowed him to run as an Independent)	83,813	30.00	▼1.13
IPP	Muhammad Ayaz Khan Niazi	61,824	22.13	
TLP	Ghulam Abbas	14,057	5.03	▲2.15
Others	Others (ten candidates)	11,774	4.21	
Turnout		283,958	57.01	▼4.41
Total valid votes		279,401	98.40	
Rejected ballots		4,557	1.60	
Majority		24,120	8.63	▼3.19
Registered electors		498,090		

== See also ==
- NA-146 Khanewal-III
- NA-148 Multan-I
