= Chaudhry Iftikhar Nazir =

Pakistani politician

- چوہدری افتخار نذیر

Member of the National Assembly of Pakistan
- Incumbent
- Assumed office 29 February 2024
- Constituency: NA-147 Khanewal-IV
- In office 13 August 2018 – 10 August 2023
- Constituency: NA-153 (Khanewal-IV)
- In office 2008 – 31 May 2018
- Constituency: NA-159 (Khanewal-IV)

Personal details
- Born: 10 June 1956 (age 70)
- Party: PMLN (2013-present)
- Other political affiliations: PPP (2002-2013)

Chaudhry Iftikhar Nazir (Urdu: چوہدری افتخار نذیر; born 10 June 1956) is a Pakistani politician who had been a member of the National Assembly of Pakistan since February 2024 and previously served in this position from August 2018 till August 2023 and from June 2008 to May 2018.

== Early life ==
He was born on 10 June 1956.

== Political career ==
He ran for the seat of the National Assembly of Pakistan as a candidate of Pakistan Peoples Party (PPP) from Constituency NA-159 (Khanewal-IV) in the 2002 Pakistani general election but was unsuccessful. He received 74,209 votes and lost the seat to Malik Ghulam Murtaza Maitla, a candidate of Pakistan Muslim League (Q) (PML-Q).

He was elected to the National Assembly as a candidate of PPP from Constituency NA-159 (Khanewal-IV) in the 2008 Pakistani general election. He received 78,255 votes and defeated Malik Ghulam Murtaza Maitla, a candidate of PML-Q.

He was re-elected to the National Assembly as a candidate of Pakistan Muslim League (N) (PML-N) from Constituency NA-159 (Khanewal-IV) in the 2013 Pakistani general election. He received 116,903 votes and defeated Malik Ghulam Murtaza Maitla, a candidate of Pakistan Tehreek-e-Insaf (PTI).

He was re-elected to the National Assembly as a candidate of PML-N from Constituency NA-153 (Khanewal-IV) in the 2018 Pakistani general election. He received votes and defeated Malik Ghulam Murtaza Maitla, a candidate of PTI.

He was re-elected to the National Assembly as a candidate of PML-N from NA-147 Khanewal-IV in the 2024 Pakistani general election. He received 107,933 votes and defeated Naveed Hameed, an Independent politician candidate supported by PTI.
