= NA-26 Mohmand =

Constituency of the National Assembly of Pakistan

- Constituency for the National Assembly of Pakistan
- Region: Mohmand District
- Electorate: 359,045

Current constituency
- Party: Sunni Ittehad Council
- Member: Sajid Khan Mohmand
- Created from: NA-43 (Tribal Area-IV)

NA-26 Mohmand (این اے-26، مہمند) is a constituency for the National Assembly of Pakistan comprising Mohmand District of Khyber Pakhtunkhwa province. It was renumbered from NA-36 to NA-43 in the 2018 to NA-26 in the 2022 delimitations.

== Members of Parliament ==
=== 2002–2018: NA-36 Tribal Area I ===
Election	Member	Party
2002	Ghulam Mohammad Sadiq	Independent
2008	Bilal Rehman	Independent
2013	Bilal Rehman	Independent

=== 2018–2023: NA-43 Tribal Area-IV ===
Election	Member	Party
2018	Sajid Khan Mohmand	PTI

=== 2023–present: NA-26 Mohmand ===
Election	Member	Party
2024	Sajid Khan Mohmand	SIC

== Election 2002 ==
General elections were held on 10 October 2002. Maulana Ghulam Muhammad Sadiq an independent candidate won by 16,358 votes.

== Election 2008 ==
The result of general election 2008 in this constituency is given below.

=== Result ===
Bilal Rehman succeeded in the election 2008 and became the member of National Assembly.

General Election 2008: Tribal Area-I
Party	Candidate	Votes	%
Independent	Bilal Rehman	5,270	28
Independent	Shahbaz Khan Mohmand	4,229	22
Independent	Maulana Ghulam Mohammad Sadiq	3,483	19
Others	Others	9,891	31

== Election 2013 ==
General elections were held on 11 May 2013. Bilal Rehman an independent candidate won by 9,005 votes and became the member of National Assembly.

== Election 2018 ==
General elections were held on 25 July 2018.

General election 2018: NA-43 (Tribal Area-V)
Party	Candidate	Votes	%	±%
PTI	Sajid Khan Mohmand	22,717	24.87	
Independent	Bilal Rehman	21,076	23.07	
ANP	Nisar Mohmand	13,778	15.08	
MMA	Ghulam Mohammad Sadiq	10,109	11.07	
Independent	Muhammad Saeed	8,182	8.96	
Independent	Abdur Rehman	4,942	5.41	
PPP	Israeel	3,642	3.99	
PML(N)	Zar Khan	3,367	3.68	
Others	Others (ten candidates)	3,546	3.87	
Turnout		92,855	36.04	
Total valid votes		91,359	98.39	
Rejected ballots		1,496	1.61	
Majority		1,641	1.80	
Registered electors		257,652		
PTI gain from Independent				

== Election 2024 ==
General elections were held on 8 February 2024. Sajid Khan Mohmand won the election with 41,502 votes.

General election 2024: NA-26 Mohmand
Party	Candidate	Votes	%	±%
Independent	Sajid Khan Mohmand (Note: Filed nomination papers as PTI candidate but ECP allowed him to run as an independent)	41,502	44.20	▲19.33
JUI (F)	Muhammad Arif	19,985	21.29	N/A
Independent	Bilal Rehman	16,371	17.44	▼5.73
ANP	Nisar Mohmand	7,798	8.31	▼6.77
Others	Others (eight candidates)	8,233	8.77	
Turnout		98,029	27.30	▼8.74
Total valid votes		93,889	95.78	
Rejected ballots		4,140	4.22	
Majority		21,517	22.92	
Registered electors		359,045		

== See also ==
- NA-25 Charsadda-II
- NA-27 Khyber
