= Ghulam Mohammad Sadiq =

Pakistani Islamic scholar and politician (died 2021)

- Died: 17 February 2021

Religious life
- Denomination: Sunni

Member of the National Assembly of Pakistan
- In office 2002–2007
- Constituency: NA-42 (Tribal Area-I)

Personal details
- Party: Jamiat Ulema-e-Islam (F)
- Children: Hafiz Rasheed Ahmed
- Occupation: Islamic scholar Politician

Ghulam Mohammad Sadiq was a Pakistani Islamic scholar and former member of the National Assembly of Pakistan.

== See also ==
- List of Deobandis
