= NA-143 (Okara-I) =

Former constituency of the National Assembly of Pakistan, 2002 to 2018

- Former constituency for the National Assembly of Pakistan
- Region: Okara District

Former constituency
- Created: 2002
- Abolished: 2018
- Replaced by: NA-141 (Okara-I) and NA-142 (Okara-II)

NA-143 (Okara-I) (Urdu: این اے-۱۴۳، اوكاڑه-۱) was a constituency of the National Assembly of Pakistan, located in Okara District, Punjab. It existed from 2002 to 2018 and principally covered the area of Gogera. Following the 2018 delimitation, the constituency was abolished and its area was incorporated into NA-141 (Okara-I) and NA-142 (Okara-II).

== Members of Parliament ==
Election	Member	Party
2002	Rai Muhammad Aslam Kharal	PML-Q
2008	Ghulam Mujtaba Kharal	PPP
2013	Ch. Nadeem Abbas Rebera	PML-N

== 2002 general election ==
General elections were held on 10 October 2002. Rai Muhammad Aslam Kharal of PML-Q won the seat with 50,106 votes.

General election 2002: NA-143 Okara-I
Party	Candidate	Votes	%	±%
PML(Q)	Rai Muhammad Aslam Kharal	50,106	42.65	
PPP	Ghulam Mujtaba Kharal	39,301	33.45	
MMA	Liaqat Ali Kausar	24,690	21.02	
Others	Others (four candidates)	3,387	2.88	
Turnout		120,906	49.60	
Total valid votes		117,484	97.17	
Rejected ballots		3,422	2.83	
Majority		10,805	9.20	
Registered electors		243,777		

== 2008 general election ==
General elections were held on 18 February 2008. Ghulam Mujtaba Kharal of the PPP won the seat with 63,960 votes.

General election 2008: NA-143 Okara-I
Party	Candidate	Votes	%	±%
PPP	Ghulam Mujtaba Kharal	63,960	51.53	
PML(Q)	Rai Muhammad Aslam Kharal	43,798	35.28	
PML(N)	Rai Muhammad Saleem Raza Kharral	15,265	12.30	
Independent	Ch. Sarfraz Hussain Bhatti	1,112	0.89	
Turnout		128,762	45.89	
Total valid votes		124,135	96.41	
Rejected ballots		4,627	3.59	
Majority		20,162	16.25	
Registered electors		280,597		

== 2013 general election ==
General elections were held on 11 May 2013. Ch. Nadeem Abbas Rebera of PML-N won the seat with 90,652 votes.

General election 2013: NA-143 Okara-I
Party	Candidate	Votes	%	±%
PML(N)	Ch. Nadeem Abbas Rebera	90,652	55.09	
PML(Q)	Rai Muhammad Aslam Kharal	39,328	23.90	
JI	Liaqat Ali	14,924	9.07	
PPP	Sumaira Mushtaq Kharal	14,351	8.72	
Independent	Rai Muhammad Saleem Raza Kharral	2,122	1.29	
Others	Others (seven candidates)	3,163	1.93	
Turnout		171,535	62.89	
Total valid votes		164,540	95.92	
Rejected ballots		6,995	4.08	
Majority		51,324	31.19	
Registered electors		272,742		
