= Hafiz Rasheed Ahmed =

Pakistani politician

- حافظ رشید احمد

Religious life
- Religion: Islam
- Denomination: Sunni

Member of the Senate of Pakistan
- In office March 2006 – March 2012

Personal details
- Party: JUI-F
- Parent: Ghulam Mohammad Sadiq (father)
- Occupation: Politician

Hafiz Rasheed Ahmed who served as a member of the Senate of Pakistan from March 2006 to March 2012.

He is the son of Ghulam Mohammad Sadiq, former member of the National Assembly of Pakistan.
