= NA-135 Okara-I =

Constituency of the National Assembly of Pakistan

- Constituency for the National Assembly of Pakistan
- Region: Okara Tehsil (partly) including Okara City (partly)Cantonment and Renala Khurd Tehsil (partly) of Okara District
- Electorate: 520,533

Current constituency
- Party: Pakistan Muslim League (N)
- Member: Chaudhry Nadeem Abbas
- Created from: NA-136 Okara-I

NA-136 Okara-I (این اے-136، اوكاڑه-۱) is a constituency for the National Assembly of Pakistan.

== Members of Parliament ==
=== 2018–2023: NA-141 Okara-I ===
Election	Member	Party
2018	Chaudhry Nadeem Abbas	PML (N)

=== 2024–present: NA-135 Okara-I ===
Election	Member	Party
2024	Chaudhry Nadeem Abbas	PML (N)

== Election 2002 ==
General elections were held on 10 October 2002. Rai Muhammad Aslam Kharal of PML-Q won by 50,106 votes.

General election 2002: NA-143 Okara-I
Party	Candidate	Votes	%	±%
PML(Q)	Rai Muhammad Aslam Kharal	50,106	42.65	
PPP	Ghulam Mujtaba Kharal	39,301	33.55	
MMA	Dr. Liaqat Ali Kausar	24,690	21.02	
Others	Others (four candidates)	3,387	2.78	
Turnout		120,906	49.60	
Total valid votes		117,484	97.17	
Rejected ballots		3,422	2.83	
Majority		10,805	9.10	
Registered electors		243,777		

== Election 2008 ==
General elections were held on 18 February 2008. Captain(R) Rai Ghulam Mujataba of PPP won by 63,960 votes.
Second highest vote were polled in favor of Mr. Muhammad Aslam Khan Kharral of Pakistan Muslim League. He got 43798 votes.

General election 2008: NA-143 Okara-I
Party	Candidate	Votes	%	±%
PPP	Ghulam Mujtaba Kharal	63,960	51.53	
PML(Q)	Rai Muhammad Aslam Kharal	43,798	35.28	
PML(N)	Rai Muhammad Saleem Raza Kharral	15,265	12.30	
Independent	Ch. Sarfraz Hussain Bhatti	1,112	0.89	
Turnout		128,762	45.89	
Total valid votes		124,135	96.41	
Rejected ballots		4,627	3.59	
Majority		20,162	16.25	
Registered electors		280,597		
PPP gain from PML(Q)				

== Election 2013 ==
General elections were held on 11 May 2013. Chaudhary Nadeem Abbas of PML-N won by 90,652 votes and became the member of National Assembly.

General election 2013: NA-143 Okara-I
Party	Candidate	Votes	%	±%
PML(N)	Ch. Nadeem Abbas Rebera	90,652	55.09	
PML(Q)	Rai Muhammad Aslam Kharal	39,328	23.90	
JI	Liaqat Ali	14,924	9.08	
PPP	Sumaira Mushtaq Kharal	14,351	8.73	
Others	Others (eight candidates)	5,285	3.20	
Turnout		171,535	62.89	
Total valid votes		164,540	95.92	
Rejected ballots		6,995	4.08	
Majority		51,324	31.09	
Registered electors		272,742		
PML(N) gain from PPP				

== Election 2018 ==
General elections were held on 25 July 2018.

General election 2018: NA-141 Okara-I
Party	Candidate	Votes	%	±%
PML(N)	Chaudhry Nadeem Abbas	92,841	35.32	
PTI	Syed Samsam Bukhari	60,217	22.91	
Independent	Khalilur Rehman	57,859	22.01	
Independent	Masood Shafqat	33,040	12.57	
Others	Others (five candidates)	18,920	7.19	
Turnout		272,295	60.23	
Total valid votes		262,877	96.54	
Rejected ballots		9,418	3.46	
Majority		32,624	12.41	
Registered electors		452,061		
PML(N) hold		Swing	N/A	

== Election 2024 ==
General elections were held on 8 February 2024. Chaudhry Nadeem Abbas won the election with 129,281 votes.

General election 2024: NA-135 Okara-I
Party	Candidate	Votes	%	±%
PML(N)	Chaudhry Nadeem Abbas	129,281	44.14	▲8.82
PTI	Malik Muhammad Akram Bhatti (Note: Filed nomination papers as PTI candidate but ECP allowed him to run as an Independent)	106,755	36.45	▲13.54
Independent	Rai Ali Noor Kharal	20,060	6.85	
Others	Others (eleven candidates)	36,781	12.56	
Turnout		300,147	57.66	▼2.57
Total valid votes		292,877	97.58	
Rejected ballots		7,270	2.42	
Majority		22,526	7.69	▼4.72
Registered electors		520,533		
PML(N) hold		Swing	N/A	

== See also ==
- NA-134 Kasur-IV
- NA-136 Okara-II
