= Constituency NA-143 =

Constituency NA-143 may refer to:

- NA-143 (Okara-III), a present constituency (after 2018 delimitation)
- NA-143 (Okara-I), a former constituency based on 2002 delimitation
