= Trust for Democratic Education and Accountability =

Nonprofit organization

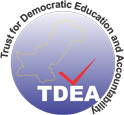
- Abbreviation: TDEA
- Formation: 2008
- Type: Nonprofit organization
- Headquarters: Islamabad, Pakistan
- CEO: Shahid Fiaz
- Key people: Muddassir Rizvi
- Website: Official website

The Trust for Democratic Education and Accountability (TDEA) is a nonprofit organization, ensuring parliamentary and governance oversight, political, elections observation and electoral reforms in Pakistan since 2008. TDEA is working to promote democracy and bridge gap between citizens and elected representatives through fieldwork, applied research, advocacy, election observation, governance monitoring, electoral reforms, oversight of legislatures and access to quality education.
