= Muhammad Khalid Bizenjo =

Pakistani senator from Balochistan

Member-elect of the Senate of Pakistan
- Preceded by: Hasil Bizenjo
- Constituency: Balochistan, Pakistan

Personal details
- Party: Balochistan Awami Party

Muhammad Khalid Bizenjo is a Pakistani politician and the member-elect of the Senate of Pakistan.

== Political career ==
He was elected to the Senate of Pakistan from Balochistan province representing Balochistan Awami Party. The election was held on 12 September 2020 between him and Maulana Ghousullah. He garnered 38 votes while Ghousullah received 21 votes.
