= Pakistan Tehreek-e-Insaf Nazriati =

- Abbreviation: PTI-N
- Leader: Akhtar Iqbal Dar
- Founded: 2012; 14 years ago
- Split from: PTI
- Headquarters: Lahore, Punjab, Pakistan

Election symbol
- Batsman

Website
- ptinazariati.wordpress.com

Pakistan Tehreek-e-Insaf Nazriati (PTI-N) is a splinter group of Pakistan Tehreek-e-Insaf (PTI). It was created by Akhtar Iqbal Dar in 2012 after a disagreement with Imran Khan, one of the founders of PTI.

== Formation and ideology ==
PTI-N was formed due to differences within PTI. Like many members of the past, Dar alleged that the PTI, founded in the name of justice, has become a turncoat party by inducting politicians from other parties.

== Recent events ==
In January 2024, the PTI accused its breakaway group, the PTI-N, of reneging on an agreement under which PTI candidates would be fielded by the PTI-N. It was allowed to contest the election on the election symbol. Subsequently, Akhtar Iqbal Dar, the chairman of PTI-N, alleged that the PTI candidates had presented “fake” nomination papers to the returning officers.

== Controversies ==
The PTI-N was accused of reneging on an agreement that allowed PTI candidates to contest elections under the PTI-N banner.
