= Syed Ghulam Mustafa Shah =

Pakistani writer (1918–1999)

Syed Ghulam Mustafa Shah (Sindhi: سيد غلام مصطفيٰ شاھ); 18 October 1918 – 9 October 1999) was a scholar, educationist and academic leader from Sindh, Pakistan. He served as Vice Chancellor of Sindh University Jamshoro and Federal Education Minister of Pakistan. He was founder of "Shah Abdul Latif Cultural Society" and launched the scholarly Journal "Sindh Quarterly".

== Biography ==
Syed Ghulam Mustafa Shah was born on 18 October 1918 at Village Qadir Dino Shah, near Bulri Shah Karim, District Sujawal, Sindh, Pakistan. He received primary education at Sujawal. He passed Matriculation examination from Sindh Madersatul Islam High School (now University) with first class first position. He passed Intermediate examination from D.J. Sindh College Karachi and graduated from Aligarh Muslim University in 1941. He also earned M.A. in Political Science and LL.B degrees. In 1946 he got scholarship to study abroad and obtained Masters and PhD degrees from Oxford University, U.K.

== Career and contributions ==
Syed Ghulam Mustafa began his career as an assistant professor at Sindh Muslim College Karachi. He then served as Professor at Government College (now Government College University) Hyderabad and Principal of Sindh Muslim College Karachi. In 1960, he was appointed as Deputy Director and then Director in Education Department. As a Director of Education, he established girls’ schools across the country, even in the most neglected, remotest regions of the country.

He worked as Vice Chancellor of Sindh University Jamshoro from 30 September 1969 to 5 December 1973. His tenure as a Vice Chancellor is considered as the golden time for the University of Sindh. Sindh University employees colony, students' hostels, and the existing building of the Institute of Sindhology were constructed in his tenure. The Sindh University Railway Station, Central Library and Central Mosque were also inaugurated in his tenure.

He was elected as member of National Assembly of Pakistan in 1988 and served as Federal Education Minister from 1988 to 1990. He was member of the executive board of United Nations Educational, Scientific and Cultural Organization (UNESCO), and secretary of the board of the Shaheed Zulfikar Ali Bhutto Institute of Science and Technology.

== Literary contributions ==
After retirement, he founded "Shah Abdul Latif Cultural Society" in Karachi. The main purpose of the society was to provide a forum for Sindhi intellectuals to study the issues pertaining to the province and raise voice from literary point of view. He organized many conferences, seminars and gatherings pertaining to the hot issues of the Sindh province. This society also published a number of valuable books in Sindhi and English. He launched the scholarly Journal "Sindh Quarterly". He served as an editor of this journal. He authored a number of books including the following:

- Sair aeen Safer, 1962
- Muashro Aeen Taleem (Society and Education), 1974.Sindhi Muashro Aeen Una Jo Mustaqabel (Sindhi: Society and its Future), 1978
- Decline of Education in Pakistan, 1990
- Lessons of History (Translation)
- English-Sindhi Dictionary, 1972
- Jam Sadiq - The Man and His Politics (1993)

== Death ==
Syed Ghulam Mustafa Shah died on 9 October 1999 and was buried in Mewa Shah graveyard of Karachi.
