= Bilal Rehman =

Pakistani politician

- بلال رحمان

Member of the National Assembly of Pakistan
- In office 17 March 2008 – 31 May 2018
- Constituency: NA-36 (Mohmand Agency)

Personal details
- Born: 23 February 1982 (age 44)
- Party: ANP (2025-present)
- Other political affiliations: IND (2008-2025)

Bilal Rehman (Urdu: بلال رحمان; born 23 February 1982) is a Pakistani politician who had been a member of the National Assembly of Pakistan from 2008 to May 2018.

== Early life ==
He was born on 23 February 1982.

== Political career ==
He was elected to the National Assembly of Pakistan as an independent candidate from Constituency NA-36 (Tribal Area-I) in the 2008 Pakistani general election. He received 5,270 votes and defeated an independent candidate Shahbaz Khan Mohmand.

He was re-elected to the National Assembly as an independent candidate from Constituency NA-36 (Tribal Area-I) in the 2013 Pakistani general election. He received 9,005 votes and defeated a candidate of Jamaat-e-Islami Pakistan.
