= List of members of the 16th National Assembly of Pakistan =

16th National Assembly
←	15th National Assembly	17th National Assembly	→
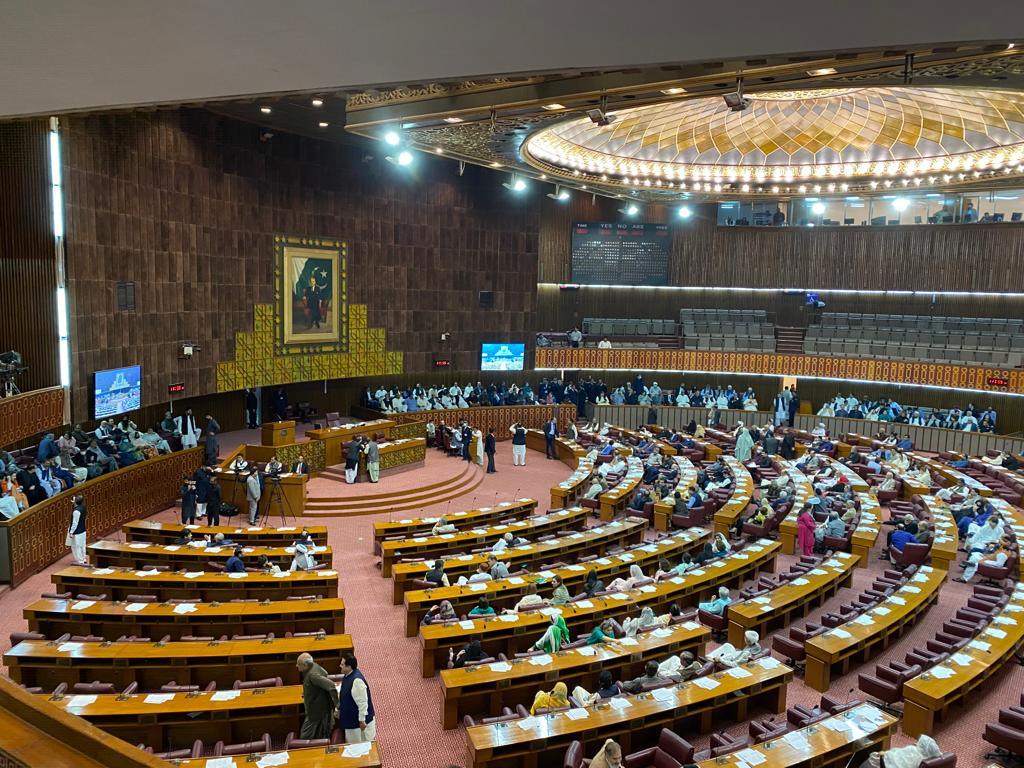

Overview
- Legislative body: National Assembly of Pakistan
- Jurisdiction: Pakistan
- Meeting place: Parliament House, Islamabad-44030
- Term: 2024 – 2029
- Election: 2024 Pakistani general election
- Government: Government of Pakistan
- Website: Official website

National Assembly of Pakistan
- Members: 336
- Speaker of the National Assembly of Pakistan: Raja Pervaiz Ashraf; Ayaz Sadiq
- Prime Minister of Pakistan: Shehbaz Sharif
- Leader of the Opposition: Mahmood Khan Achakzai
- President of Pakistan: Asif Ali Zardari

The 16th National Assembly of Pakistan is the legislature of Pakistan following the 2024 general election of members of the National Assembly of Pakistan, the lower house of the bicameral Parliament of Pakistan. The National Assembly is a democratically elected body which consists of 336 members during the 2024–2029 tenure, the members are referred to as Members of the National Assembly (MNAs), of which 266 are directly elected members; 60 reserved seats for women and religious minorities are allocated to the political parties according to their proportion of the total vote.

The legislature was formed following the elections in February 2024 which resulted in Independent politicians backed by the Pakistan Tehreek-e-Insaf (PTI) being the single-largest faction in the assembly, holding 93 seats, with Independents total holding 101 seats. A majority of Independent politicians backed by PTI declared the election as rigged, following this, they declared their affiliation under the Sunni Ittehad Council (SIC) as a parliamentary vehicle, as PTI was unable to officially have a presence in the assembly due to the Election Commission of Pakistan. This resulted in the Pakistan Muslim League (N) (PML-N) becoming the single-largest party officially. The assembly has seen no party hold an outright majority, hence the PML-N has formed a coalition government with support from the MQM–P, NP, IPP and BAP while the 68-seat Pakistan People's Party (PPP) has declared Confidence and supply to the coalition government.

The assembly saw the transfer of the 60 women and minorities reserve seats excluding PTI-backed SIC due to legal issues regarding the filing of nomination papers. This decision by the Election Commission of Pakistan resulted in the Reserved seats case in which the Supreme Court of Pakistan officially suspended 24 reserved seats in the assembly, making them vacant. The Supreme Court also recognized PTI as a party holding 39 seats, undoing the Election Commission's actions.

== By constituency ==
Region	Constituency	Member	Political party		Assumed office	Ref.
Khyber Pakhtunkhwa	NA-1 Chitral	Vacant				
Khyber Pakhtunkhwa	NA-2 Swat-I	Amjad Ali Khan		SIC	29 February 2024	
Khyber Pakhtunkhwa	NA-3 Swat-II	Salim Rehman		SIC	29 February 2024	
Khyber Pakhtunkhwa	NA-4 Swat-III	Sohail Sultan		SIC	29 February 2024	
Khyber Pakhtunkhwa	NA-5 Upper Dir	Sahibzada Sibghatullah		SIC	29 February 2024	
Khyber Pakhtunkhwa	NA-6 Lower Dir-I	Muhammad Bashir Khan		SIC	29 February 2024	
Khyber Pakhtunkhwa	NA-7 Lower Dir-II	Mehboob Shah		SIC	29 February 2024	
Khyber Pakhtunkhwa	NA-8 Bajaur	Mubarak Zeb Khan		ANP	13 May 2024	
Khyber Pakhtunkhwa	NA-9 Malakand	Junaid Akbar		SIC	29 February 2024	
Khyber Pakhtunkhwa	NA-10 Buner	Gohar Ali Khan		SIC	29 February 2024	
Khyber Pakhtunkhwa	NA-11 Shangla	Amir Muqam		PML(N)	29 February 2024	
Khyber Pakhtunkhwa	NA-12 Kohistan	Malik Muhammad Idrees		PML(N)	29 February 2024	
Khyber Pakhtunkhwa	NA-13 Battagram	Muhammad Nawaz Khan Allai		SIC	29 February 2024	
Khyber Pakhtunkhwa	NA-14 Mansehra	Sardar Muhammad Yousuf		PML(N)	29 February 2024	
Khyber Pakhtunkhwa	NA-15 Mansehra-cum-Torghar	Shahzada Muhammad Gushtasap Khan		SIC	1 March 2024	
Khyber Pakhtunkhwa	NA-16 Abbottabad-I	Ali Asghar Khan		SIC	29 February 2024	
Khyber Pakhtunkhwa	NA-17 Abbottabad-II	Ali Khan Jadoon		SIC	29 February 2024	
Khyber Pakhtunkhwa	NA-18 Haripur	Babar Nawaz Khan		PML(N)	29 February 2024	
Khyber Pakhtunkhwa	NA-19 Swabi-I	Asad Qaiser		SIC	29 February 2024	
Khyber Pakhtunkhwa	NA-20 Swabi-II	Shahram Khan Tarakai		SIC	29 February 2024	
Khyber Pakhtunkhwa	NA-21 Mardan-I	Mujahid Ali		SIC	29 February 2024	
Khyber Pakhtunkhwa	NA-22 Mardan-II	Atif Khan		SIC	29 February 2024	
Khyber Pakhtunkhwa	NA-23 Mardan-III	Ali Muhammad Khan		SIC	29 February 2024	
Khyber Pakhtunkhwa	NA-24 Charsadda-I	Malik Anwar Taj		SIC	29 February 2024	
Khyber Pakhtunkhwa	NA-25 Charsadda-II	Fazal Muhammad Khan		SIC	29 February 2024	
Khyber Pakhtunkhwa	NA-26 Mohmand	Sajid Khan Mohmand		SIC	29 February 2024	
Khyber Pakhtunkhwa	NA-27 Khyber	Mohammed Iqbal Khan Afridi		SIC	29 February 2024	
Khyber Pakhtunkhwa	NA-28 Peshawar-I	Noor Alam Khan		JUI(F)	29 February 2024	
Khyber Pakhtunkhwa	NA-29 Peshawar-II	Arbab Amir Ayub		SIC	29 February 2024	
Khyber Pakhtunkhwa	NA-30 Peshawar-III	Shandana Gulzar		SIC	29 February 2024	
Khyber Pakhtunkhwa	NA-31 Peshawar-IV	Sher Ali Arbab		SIC	29 February 2024	
Khyber Pakhtunkhwa	NA-32 Peshawar-V	Asif Khan		SIC	29 February 2024	
Khyber Pakhtunkhwa	NA-33 Nowshera-I	Pervez Khattak		PTI-P	31 August 2026	
Khyber Pakhtunkhwa	NA-34 Nowshera-II	Zulfiqar Ali		SIC	29 February 2024	
Khyber Pakhtunkhwa	NA-35 Kohat	Shehryar Afridi		SIC	29 February 2024	
Khyber Pakhtunkhwa	NA-36 Hangu	Yousuf Khan		SIC	29 February 2024	
Khyber Pakhtunkhwa	NA-37 Kurram-II	Hameed Hussain		MWM	29 February 2024	
Khyber Pakhtunkhwa	NA-38 Karak	Shahid Ahmed Khattak		SIC	29 February 2024	
Khyber Pakhtunkhwa	NA-39 Bannu	Nasim Ali Shah		SIC	29 February 2024	
Khyber Pakhtunkhwa	NA-40 North Waziristan	Misbahuddin		JUI(F)	29 February 2024	
Khyber Pakhtunkhwa	NA-41 Lakki Marwat	Sher Afzal Marwat		PPP	29 February 2024	
Khyber Pakhtunkhwa	NA-42 South Waziristan	Zubair Khan Wazir		SIC	29 February 2024	
Khyber Pakhtunkhwa	NA-43 Tank	Dawar Khan Kundi		SIC	29 February 2024	
Khyber Pakhtunkhwa	NA-44 Dera Ismail Khan-I	Faisal Amin Khan Gandapur		SIC	26 April 2024	
Khyber Pakhtunkhwa	NA-45 D I Khan-II	Fatehullah Khan Miankhel		PPP	29 February 2024	
Islamabad Capital Territory	NA-46 Islamabad-I	Anjum Aqeel Khan		PML(N)	29 February 2024	
Islamabad Capital Territory	NA-47 Islamabad-II	Tariq Fazal Chaudhry		PML(N)	29 February 2024	
Islamabad Capital Territory	NA-48 Islamabad-III	Khurram Shehzad Nawaz		PML(N)	29 February 2024	
Punjab	NA-49 Attock-I	Sheikh Aftab Ahmed		PML(N)	29 February 2024	
Punjab	NA-50 Attock-II	Saad Hussain Rizvi		TLP	31 August 2026	
Punjab	NA-51 Murree-cum-Rawalpindi	Raja Usama Sarwar		PML(N)	29 February 2024	
Punjab	NA-52 Rawalpindi-I	Raja Pervaiz Ashraf		PPP	29 February 2024	
Punjab	NA-53 Rawalpindi-II	Qamar-ul-Islam Raja		PML(N)	29 February 2024	
Punjab	NA-54 Rawalpindi-III	Aqeel Malik		PML(N)	29 February 2024	
Punjab	NA-55 Rawalpindi-IV	Malik Ibrar Ahmed		PML(N)	29 February 2024	
Punjab	NA-56 Rawalpindi-V	Hanif Abbasi		PML(N)	29 February 2024	
Punjab	NA-57 Rawalpindi-VI	Daniyal Chaudhary		PML(N)	29 February 2024	
Punjab	NA-58 Chakwal	Tahir Iqbal		PML(N)	29 February 2024	
Punjab	NA-59 Chakwal-cum-Talagang	Sardar Ghulam Abbas		PML(N)	29 February 2024	
Punjab	NA-60 Jhelum-I	Bilal Azhar Kayani		PML(N)	29 February 2024	
Punjab	NA-61 Jhelum-II	Chaudhry Farrukh Altaf		PML(N)	29 February 2024	
Punjab	NA-62 Gujrat-I	Muhammad Ilyas Chaudhary		PML(Q)	29 February 2024	
Punjab	NA-63 Gujrat-II	Chaudhry Hussain Elahi		PML(Q)	29 February 2024	
Punjab	NA-64 Gujrat-III	Chaudhry Salik Hussain		PML(Q)	29 February 2024	
Punjab	NA-65 Gujrat-IV	Chaudhary Naseer Ahmed Abbas		PML(N)	29 February 2024	
Punjab	NA-66 Wazirabad	Bilal Farooq Tarar		PML(N)	27 November 2025	
Punjab	NA-67 Hafizabad	Aneeqa Mehdi		SIC	29 February 2024	
Punjab	NA-68 Mandi Bahauddin-I	Imtiaz Ahmed Chaudhary		JUI (F)	29 February 2024	
Punjab	NA-69 Mandi Bahauddin-II	Nasir Iqbal Bosal		PML(N)	29 February 2024	
Punjab	NA-70 Sialkot-I	Armaghan Subhani		PML(N)	29 February 2024	
Punjab	NA-71 Sialkot-II	Khawaja Asif		PML(N)	29 February 2024	
Punjab	NA-72 Sialkot-III	Ali Zahid		PML(N)	29 February 2024	
Punjab	NA-73 Sialkot-IV	Syeda Nosheen Iftikhar		PML(N)	29 February 2024	
Punjab	NA-74 Sialkot-V	Aslam Ghumman		PML(Q)	29 February 2024	
Punjab	NA-75 Narowal-I	Anwaarul Haq Chaudhary		PML(N)	29 February 2024	
Punjab	NA-76 Narowal-II	Ahsan Iqbal		PML(N)	29 February 2024	
Punjab	NA-77 Gujranwala-I	Chaudhry Mehmood Bashir		PML(N)	29 February 2024	
Punjab	NA-78 Gujranwala-II	Chaudhary Mubeen Arif Jutt		SIC	29 February 2024	
Punjab	NA-79 Gujranwala-III	Chaudhary Ahsaanullah Virk		SIC	29 February 2024	
Punjab	NA-80 Gujranwala-IV	Shahid Usman Ibrahim		PML(N)	29 February 2024	
Punjab	NA-81 Gujranwala-V	Azhar Qayyum		PML(N)	29 February 2024	
Punjab	NA-82 Sargodha-I	Nadeem Afzal Chan		PPP	31 August 2026	
Punjab	NA-83 Sargodha-II	Usama Ghias Mela		SIC	29 February 2024	
Punjab	NA-84 Sargodha-III	Malik Shafqat Abbas Awan		SIC	29 February 2024	
Punjab	NA-85 Sargodha-IV	Zulfiqar Ali Bhatti		PML(N)	29 February 2024	
Punjab	NA-86 Sargodha-V	Miqdad Ali Khan Baloch		SIC	29 February 2024	
Punjab	NA-87 Khushab-I	Malik Shakir Bashir Awan		PML(N)	29 February 2024	
Punjab	NA-88 Khushab-II	Gul Asghar Khan		IPP	29 February 2024	
Punjab	NA-89 Mianwali-I	Jamal Ahsan Khan Isakhel		SIC	29 February 2024	
Punjab	NA-90 Mianwali-II	Umair Khan Niazi		SIC	29 February 2024	
Punjab	NA-91 Bhakkar-I	Sanaullah Khan Mastikhel		SIC	29 February 2024	
Punjab	NA-92 Bhakkar-II	Rashid Akbar Khan Nawani		PML(N)	29 February 2024	
Punjab	NA-93 Chiniot-I	Ghulam Muhammad Lali		SIC	29 February 2024	
Punjab	NA-94 Chiniot-II	Qaiser Ahmed Sheikh		PML(N)	29 February 2024	
Punjab	NA-95 Faisalabad-I	Ali Afzal Sahi		SIC	29 February 2024	
Punjab	NA-96 Faisalabad-II	Chaudhary Muhammad Tufail		PML(N)	27 November 2025	
Punjab	NA-97 Faisalabad-III	Saadullah Khan Baloch		SIC	29 February 2024	
Punjab	NA-98 Faisalabad-IV	Chaudhry Shehbaz Babar		PML(N)	29 February 2024	
Punjab	NA-99 Faisalabad-V	Malik Umar Farooq Mushtaq		SIC	29 February 2024	
Punjab	NA-100 Faisalabad-VI	Nisar Ahmad Jutt		SIC	29 February 2024	
Punjab	NA-101 Faisalabad-VII	Rana Atif		SIC	29 February 2024	
Punjab	NA-102 Faisalabad-VIII	Changaiz Ahmed Khan Kakar		SIC	29 February 2024	
Punjab	NA-103 Faisalabad-IX	Muhammad Ali Sarfraz		SIC	29 February 2024	
Punjab	NA-104 Faisalabad-X	Raja Daniyal Ahmed Khan		PML(N)	27 November 2025	5 August 2025
Punjab	NA-105 Toba Tek Singh-I	Usama Hamza		SIC	29 February 2024	
Punjab	NA-106 Toba Tek Singh-II	Muhammad Junaid Anwar		PML(N)	29 February 2024	
Punjab	NA-107 Toba Tek Singh-III	Riaz Fatyana		SIC	29 February 2024	
Punjab	NA-108 Jhang-I	Sahabzada Mehboob Sultan		SIC	29 February 2024	
Punjab	NA-109 Jhang-II	Muhammad Ahmed Ludhianvi		PRHP	31 August 2026	
Punjab	NA-110 Jhang-III	Muhammad Ameer Sultan		IPP	29 February 2024	
Punjab	NA-111 Nankana Sahib-I	Arshad Sahi		SIC	29 February 2024	
Punjab	NA-112 Nankana Sahib-II	Shizra Mansab Ali Khan		PML(N)	29 February 2024	
Punjab	NA-113 Sheikhupura-I	Rana Ahmed Ateeq Anwar		PML(N)	29 February 2024	
Punjab	NA-114 Sheikhupura-II	Rana Tanveer Hussain		PML(N)	29 February 2024	
Punjab	NA-115 Sheikhupura-III	Khurram Shahzad Virk		SIC	29 February 2024	
Punjab	NA-116 Sheikhupura-IV	Khurram Munawar Manj		SIC	29 February 2024	
Punjab	NA-117 Lahore-I	Aleem Khan		IPP	29 February 2024	
Punjab	NA-118 Lahore-II	Hamza Shahbaz		PML(N)	29 February 2024	
Punjab	NA-119 Lahore-III	Ali Pervaiz Malik		PML(N)	29 April 2024	
Punjab	NA-120 Lahore-IV	Ayaz Sadiq		PML(N)	29 February 2024	
Punjab	NA-121 Lahore-V	Waseem Qadir		PML(N)	29 February 2024	
Punjab	NA-122 Lahore-VI	Latif Khosa		SIC	29 February 2024	
Punjab	NA-123 Lahore-VII	Shehbaz Sharif		PML(N)	29 February 2024	
Punjab	NA-124 Lahore-VIII	Rana Mubashir Iqbal		PML(N)	29 February 2024	
Punjab	NA-125 Lahore-IX	Afzal Khokhar		PML(N)	29 February 2024	
Punjab	NA-126 Lahore-X	Malik Saif ul Malook Khokhar		PML(N)	29 February 2024	
Punjab	NA-127 Lahore-XI	Attaullah Tarar		PML(N)	29 February 2024	
Punjab	NA-128 Lahore-XII	Awn Chawdhary		IPP	29 February 2024	
Punjab	NA-129 Lahore-XIII	Mian Muhammad Azhar		SIC	29 February 2024	
Punjab	NA-130 Lahore-XIV	Nawaz Sharif		PML(N)	29 February 2024	
Punjab	NA-131 Kasur-I	Saad Waseem Akhtar Sheikh		PML(N)	29 February 2024	
Punjab	NA-132 Kasur-II	Malik Rasheed Ahmed Khan		PML(N)	29 April 2024	
Punjab	NA-133 Kasur-III	Azeemuddin Zahid Lakhvi		SIC	29 February 2024	
Punjab	NA-134 Kasur-IV	Rana Muhammad Hayat		PML(N)	29 February 2024	
Punjab	NA-135 Okara-I	Chaudhry Nadeem Abbas		PML(N)	29 February 2024	
Punjab	NA-136 Okara-II	Riaz-ul-Haq		PML(N)	29 February 2024	
Punjab	NA-137 Okara-III	Syed Raza Ali Gillani		SIC	29 February 2024	
Punjab	NA-138 Okara-IV	Muhammad Moeen Wattoo		PML(N)	29 February 2024	
Punjab	NA-139 Pakpattan-I	Ahmad Raza Maneka		PML(N)	29 February 2024	
Punjab	NA-140 Pakpattan-II	Rana Iradat Sharif Khan		PML(N)	29 February 2024	
Punjab	NA-141 Sahiwal-I	Syed Imran Ahmed Shah		PML(N)	29 February 2024	
Punjab	NA-142 Sahiwal-II	Chaudhary Usman Ali		PML(N)	29 February 2024	
Punjab	NA-143 Sahiwal-III	Muhammad Bilal Badar		PML(N)	27 November 2025	
Punjab	NA-144 Khanewal-I	Raza Hayat Hiraj		PML(N)	29 February 2024	
Punjab	NA-145 Khanewal-II	Muhammad Khan Daha		PML(N)	29 February 2024	
Punjab	NA-146 Khanewal-III	Aslam Bodla		PML(N)	31 August 2026	
Punjab	NA-147 Khanewal-IV	Chaudhry Iftikhar Nazir		PML(N)	29 February 2024	
Punjab	NA-148 Multan-I	Kasim Gilani		PPP	7 June 2024	
Punjab	NA-148 Multan-I	NA-149 Multan-II	Malik Aamir Dogar		SIC	29 February 2024
Punjab	NA-150 Multan-III	Zain Qureshi		SIC	29 February 2024	
Punjab	NA-151 Multan-IV	Ali Musa Gilani		PPP	29 February 2024	
Punjab	NA-152 Multan-V	Abdul Qadir Gillani		PPP	29 February 2024	
Punjab	NA-153 Multan-VI	Rana Muhammad Qasim Noon		PML(N)	29 February 2024	
Punjab	NA-154 Lodhran-I	Rana Muhammad Faraz Noon		SIC	29 February 2024	
Punjab	NA-155 Lodhran-II	Siddique Khan Baloch		PML(N)	29 February 2024	
Punjab	NA-156 Vehari-I	Ayesha Nazir Jutt		SIC	29 February 2024	
Punjab	NA-157 Vehari-II	Syed Sajid Mehdi		PML(N)	29 February 2024	
Punjab	NA-158 Vehari-III	Tehmina Daultana		PML(N)	29 February 2024	
Punjab	NA-159 Vehari-IV	Aurangzeb Khan Khichi		PML(N)	29 February 2024	
Punjab	NA-160 Bahawalnagar-I	Abdul Ghaffar Wattoo		PML(N)	29 February 2024	
Punjab	NA-161 Bahawalnagar-II	Alam Dad Lalika		PML(N)	29 February 2024	
Punjab	NA-162 Bahawalnagar-III	Ehsan Ul Haq Bajwa		PML(N)	29 February 2024	
Punjab	NA-163 Bahawalnagar-IV	Ijaz-ul-Haq		PML(Z)	29 February 2024	
Punjab	NA-164 Bahawalpur-I	Riaz Hussain Pirzada		PML(N)	29 February 2024	
Punjab	NA-165 Bahawalpur-II	Tariq Bashir Cheema		PML(Q)	29 February 2024	
Punjab	NA-166 Bahawalpur-III	Makhdoom Syed Sami Ul Hassan Gillani		PML(N)	29 February 2024	
Punjab	NA-167 Bahawalpur-IV	Usman Owaisi		PML(N)	29 February 2024	
Punjab	NA-168 Bahawalpur-V	Malik Muhammad Iqbal Channar		PML(N)	29 February 2024	
Punjab	NA-169 Rahim Yar Khan-I	Makhdoom Syed Murtaza Mehmood		PPP	29 February 2024	
Punjab	NA-170 Rahim Yar Khan-II	Mian Ghous Muhammad		SIC	29 February 2024	
Punjab	NA-171 Rahim Yar Khan-III	Makhdoom Tahir Rashid ud Din		PPP	12 September 2024	
Punjab	NA-171 Rahim Yar Khan-III	NA-172 Rahim Yar Khan-IV	Javed Iqbal Warraich		SIC	29 February 2024
Punjab	NA-173 Rahim Yar Khan-V	Makhdoom Syed Mustafa Mehmood		PPP	29 February 2024	
Punjab	NA-174 Rahim Yar Khan-VI	Azhar Laghari		PML(N)	29 February 2024	
Punjab	NA-175 Muzaffargarh-I	Jamshed Dasti		SIC	29 February 2024	16 July 2025
Punjab	NA-176 Muzaffargarh-II	Iftikhar Ahmed Khan Babar		PPP	29 February 2024	
Punjab	NA-177 Muzaffargarh-III	Moazam Ali Khan Jatoi		SIC	29 February 2024	
Punjab	NA-178 Muzaffargarh-IV	Sardar Aamir Talal Khan Gopang		PML(N)	29 February 2024	
Punjab	NA-179 Kot Addu-I	Shabbir Ali Qureshi		SIC	29 February 2024	
Punjab	NA-180 Kot Addu-II	Mian Fayyaz Hussain Chhajrra		SIC	29 February 2024	
Punjab	NA-181 Layyah-I	Anbar Majeed Khan Niazi		SIC	29 February 2024	
Punjab	NA-182 Layyah-II	Malik Awais Jakhar		SIC	29 February 2024	
Punjab	NA-183 Taunsa	Khawaja Sheraz Mehmood		PML(N)	29 February 2024	
Punjab	NA-184 Dera Ghazi Khan-I	Abdul Qadir Khan Khosa		PML(N)	29 February 2024	
Punjab	NA-185 Dera Ghazi Khan-II	Zartaj Gul		SIC	29 February 2024	5 August 2025
Punjab	NA-186 Dera Ghazi Khan-III	Awais Leghari		PML(N)	29 February 2024	
Punjab	NA-187 Rajanpur-I	Ammar Ahmed Khan Laghari		PML(N)	29 February 2024	
Punjab	NA-188 Rajanpur-II	Hafeez-ur-Rehman Dreshak		PML(N)	29 February 2024	
Punjab	NA-189 Rajanpur-III	Shamsher Ali Mazari		PML(N)	29 February 2024	
Punjab	Sindh	NA-190 Jacobabad	Aijaz Hussain Jakhrani		PPP	29 February 2024
Punjab	Sindh	NA-191 Jacobabad-cum-Kashmore	Ali Jan Mazari		PPP	29 February 2024
NA-192 Kashmore-cum-Shikarpur	Sindh	Mir Shabbir Bijarani		PPP	29 February 2024	
NA-193 Shikarpur	Sindh	Muhammad Shaharyar Khan Mahar		PPP	29 February 2024	
NA-194 Larkana-I	Sindh	Bilawal Bhutto Zardari		PPP	29 February 2024	
NA-195 Larkana-II	Sindh	Nazeer Ahmed Baghio		PPP	29 February 2024	
NA-196 Qambar Shahdadkot-I	Sindh	Khursheed Ahmed Junejo		PPP	29 April 2024	
NA-197 Qambar Shahdadkot-II	Sindh	Mir Aamir Ali Khan Magsi		PPP	29 February 2024	
NA-198 Ghotki-I	Sindh	Khalid Ahmed Khan Lund		PPP	29 February 2024	
NA-199 Ghotki-II	Sindh	Ali Gohar Khan Mahar		PPP	29 February 2024	
NA-200 Sukkur-I	Sindh	Nauman Islam Shaikh		PPP	29 February 2024	
NA-201 Sukkur-II	Sindh	Syed Khursheed Ahmed Shah		PPP	29 February 2024	
NA-202 Khairpur-I	Sindh	Nafisa Shah		PPP	29 February 2024	
NA-203 Khairpur-II	Sindh	Fazal Ali Shah		PPP	29 February 2024	
NA-204 Khairpur-III	Sindh	Syed Javed Ali Shah Jillani		PPP	29 February 2024	
NA-205 Naushahro Feroze-I	Sindh	Sayed Abrar Ali Shah		PPP	29 February 2024	
NA-206 Naushahro Feroze-II	Sindh	Zulfiqar Ali Behan		PPP	29 February 2024	
NA-207 Nawabshah-I	Sindh	Asif Ali Zardari		PPP	29 February 2024	9 March 2024
NA-207 Nawabshah-I	Sindh	Aseefa Bhutto Zardari		PPP	15 April 2024	
NA-208 Nawabshah-II	Sindh	Syed Ghulam Mustafa Shah		PPP	29 February 2024	
NA-209 Sanghar-I	Sindh	Shazia Marri		PPP	29 February 2024	
NA-210 Sanghar-II	Sindh	Salahuddin Junejo		PPP	29 February 2024	
NA-211 Mirpur Khas-I	Sindh	Aftab Hussain Shah Jillani		PPP	29 February 2024	
NA-212 Mirpur Khas-II	Sindh	Mir Munawar Ali Talpur		PPP	29 February 2024	
NA-213 Umerkot	Sindh	Nawab Yousuf Talpur		PPP	29 February 2024	18 February 2025 (died)
NA-214 Tharparkar-I	Sindh	Pir Ameer Ali Shah Jeelani		PPP	29 February 2024	
NA-215 Tharparkar-II	Sindh	Mahesh Kumar Malani		PPP	29 February 2024	
NA-216 Matiari	Sindh	Makhdoom Jamiluzaman		PPP	29 February 2024	
NA-217 Tando Allahyar	Sindh	Zulfiqar Sattar Bachani		PPP	29 February 2024	
NA-218 Hyderabad-I	Sindh	Syed Hussain Tariq		PPP	29 February 2024	
NA-219 Hyderabad-II	Sindh	Abdul Aleem Khanzada		MQM–P	29 February 2024	
NA-220 Hyderabad-III	Sindh	Syed Waseem Hussain		MQM–P	29 February 2024	
NA-221 Tando Muhammad Khan	Sindh	Syed Naveed Qamar		PPP	29 February 2024	
NA-222 Badin-I	Sindh	Mir Ghulam Ali Talpur		PPP	29 February 2024	
NA-223 Badin-II	Sindh	Rasool Bakhsh Chandio		PPP	29 February 2024	
NA-224 Sujawal	Sindh	Syed Ayaz Ali Shah Sheerazi		PPP	29 February 2024	
NA-225 Thatta	Sindh	Sadiq Ali Memon		PPP	29 February 2024	
NA-226 Jamshoro	Sindh	Asad Sikandar		PPP	29 February 2024	
NA-227 Dadu-I	Sindh	Irfan Zafar Leghari		PPP	29 February 2024	
NA-228 Dadu-II	Sindh	Rafiq Ahmed Jamali		PPP	29 February 2024	
NA-229 Malir-I	Sindh	Jam Abdul Karim Bijar		PPP	29 February 2024	
NA-230 Malir-II	Sindh	Syed Rafiullah		PPP	29 February 2024	
NA-231 Malir-III	Sindh	Abdul Hakeem Baloch		PPP	29 February 2024	
NA-232 Karachi Korangi-I	Sindh	Aasia Ishaque		MQM–P	29 February 2024	
NA-233 Karachi Korangi-II	Sindh	Muhammad Javed Hanif Khan		MQM–P	29 February 2024	
NA-234 Karachi Korangi-III	Sindh	Muhammad Moin Aamir Pirzada		MQM–P	29 February 2024	
NA-235 Karachi East-I	Sindh	Muhammad Iqbal Khan		MQM–P	29 February 2024	
NA-236 Karachi East-II	Sindh	Hassaan Sabir		MQM–P	29 February 2024	
NA-237 Karachi East-III	Sindh	Asad Alam Niazi		PPP	29 February 2024	
NA-238 Karachi East-IV	Sindh	Sadiq Iftikhar		MQM-P	29 February 2024	
NA-239 Karachi South-I	Sindh	Nabil Gabol		MQM–P	29 February 2024	
NA-240 Karachi South-II	Sindh	Arshad Abdullah Vohra		MQM–P	29 February 2024	
NA-241 Karachi South-III	Sindh	Mirza Ikhtiar Baig		PPP	29 February 2024	
NA-242 Karachi Keamari-I	Sindh	Syed Mustafa Kamal		MQM–P	29 February 2024	
NA-243 Karachi Keamari-II	Sindh	Abdul Qadir Patel		PPP	29 February 2024	
NA-244 Karachi West-I	Sindh	Farooq Sattar		MQM–P	29 February 2024	
NA-245 Karachi West-II	Sindh	Syed Hafeezuddin		MQM–P	29 February 2024	
NA-246 Karachi West-III	Sindh	Syed Aminul Haque		MQM–P	29 February 2024	
NA-247 Karachi Central-I	Sindh	Khawaja Izharul Hassan		MQM–P	29 February 2024	
NA-248 Karachi Central-II	Sindh	Khalid Maqbool Siddiqui		MQM–P	29 February 2024	
NA-249 Karachi Central-III	Sindh	Ahmed Salim Siddiqui		MQM–P	29 February 2024	
NA-250 Karachi Central-IV	Sindh	Farhan Chishti		MQM–P	29 February 2024	
Balochistan	NA-251 Sherani-cum-Zhob-cum-Killa Saifullah	Khushal Khan Kakar		PNAP	27 February 2026	
Balochistan	NA-251 Sherani-cum-Zhob-cum-Killa Saifullah	NA-252 Musakhel-cum-Barkhan-cum-Loralai-cum-Duki	Sardar Yaqoob Nasir		PML(N)	29 February 2024
Balochistan	NA-253 Ziarat-cum-Harnai-cum-Sibbi-cum-Kohlu-cum-Dera Bugti	Mian Khan Mondrani		PML(N)	29 February 2024	
Balochistan	NA-254 Nasirabad-cum-Kachhi-cum-Jhal Magsi	Khalid Hussain Magsi		BAP	29 February 2024	
Balochistan	NA-255 Sohbat Pur-cum-Jaffarabad-cum-Usta Muhammad-cum-Nasirabad	Mir Khan Muhammad Jamali		PML(N)	29 February 2024	
Balochistan	NA-256 Khuzdar	Akhtar Mengal		BNP(M)	29 February 2024	3 September 2024
Balochistan	NA-257 Hub-cum-Lasbela-cum-Awaran	Jam Kamal Khan		PML(N)	3 March 2024	
Balochistan	NA-258 Panjgur-cum-Kech	Waja Pullain Baloch		NP	29 February 2024	
Balochistan	NA-259 Kech-cum-Gwadar	Malik Shah Gorgaij		PPP	29 February 2024	
Balochistan	NA-260 Chagai-cum-Nushki-cum-Kharan-cum-Washuk	Usman Badini		JUI(F)	29 February 2024	
Balochistan	NA-261 Surab-cum-Kalat-cum-Mastung	Abdul Ghafoor Haideri		JUI(F)	29 February 2024	
Balochistan	NA-262 Quetta-I	Adil Khan Bazai		SIC	29 February 2024	
Balochistan	NA-263 Quetta-II	Jamal Shah Kakar		PML(N)	29 February 2024	
Balochistan	NA-264 Quetta-IIi	Jamal Raisani		PPP	29 February 2024	
Balochistan	NA-265 Pishin	Fazal-ur-Rehman		JUI(F)	29 February 2024	
Balochistan	NA-266 Killa Abdullah-cum-Chaman	Mehmood Khan Achakzai		PkMAP	29 February 2024	
Balochistan	Reserved seats	Women			Seat suspended due to Reserved seats case	
	Reserved seats	Women		Seat suspended due to Reserved seats case		
	Reserved seats	Women		Seat suspended due to Reserved seats case		
	Reserved seats	Women		Seat suspended due to Reserved seats case		
	Reserved seats	Women		Seat suspended due to Reserved seats case		
	Reserved seats	Women		Seat suspended due to Reserved seats case		
	Reserved seats	Women		Seat suspended due to Reserved seats case		
	Reserved seats	Women		Seat suspended due to Reserved seats case		
Tahira Aurangzeb	Reserved seats	Women		PML(N)	29 February 2024	
Shaista Pervaiz	Reserved seats	Women		PML(N)	29 February 2024	
Muneeba Iqbal	Reserved seats	Women		PML(N)	1 March 2024	
	Reserved seats	Women		Seat suspended due to Reserved seats case		
	Reserved seats	Women		Seat suspended due to Reserved seats case		
Bushra Anjum Butt	Reserved seats	Women		PML(N)	1 April 2024	
	Reserved seats	Women		Seat suspended due to Reserved seats case		
	Reserved seats	Women		Seat suspended due to Reserved seats case		
Sofia Saeed Shah	Reserved seats	Women		MQM–P	1 April 2024	
	Reserved seats	Women		Seat suspended due to Reserved seats case		
	Reserved seats	Women		Seat suspended due to Reserved seats case		
Nuzhat Sadiq	Reserved seats	Women		PML(N)	29 February 2024	
Musarrat Asif Khawaja	Reserved seats	Women		PML(N)	29 February 2024	
Seema Mohiuddin Jameeli	Reserved seats	Women		PML(N)	29 February 2024	
Shaza Fatima Khawaja	Reserved seats	Women		PML(N)	29 February 2024	
Romina Khurshid Alam	Reserved seats	Women		PML(N)	29 February 2024	
Wajiha Akram	Reserved seats	Women		PML(N)	29 February 2024	
Zeb Jaffar	Reserved seats	Women		PML(N)	29 February 2024	
Kiran Imran Dar	Reserved seats	Women		PML(N)	29 February 2024	
Anusha Rahman	Reserved seats	Women		PML(N)	29 February 2024	
Zahra Wadood Fatemi	Reserved seats	Women		PML(N)	29 February 2024	
Asyia Naz Tanoli	Reserved seats	Women		PML(N)	29 February 2024	
Saba Sadiq	Reserved seats	Women		PML(N)	29 February 2024	
Farah Naz Akbar	Reserved seats	Women		PML(N)	29 February 2024	
Shahnaz Saleem Malik	Reserved seats	Women		PML(N)	29 February 2024	
Hina Rabbani Khar	Reserved seats	Women		PPP	29 February 2024	
Munaza Hassan	Reserved seats	Women		IPP	29 February 2024	
Farukh Khan	Reserved seats	Women		PML(Q)	29 February 2024	
Sehar Kamran	Reserved seats	Women		PPP	29 February 2024	
Sharmila Faruqui	Reserved seats	Women		PPP	29 February 2024	
Shagufta Jumani	Reserved seats	Women		PML(N)	29 February 2024	
Shahida Rehmani	Reserved seats	Women		PPP	29 February 2024	
Shehla Raza	Reserved seats	Women		PPP	29 February 2024	
Mahtab Rashdi	Reserved seats	Women		PPP	29 February 2024	
Musarat Rafique Mahesar	Reserved seats	Women		PPP	29 February 2024	
Mahreen Razaque Bhutto	Reserved seats	Women		PPP	29 February 2024	
Shazia Sobia	Reserved seats	Women		PPP	29 February 2024	
Naz Baloch	Reserved seats	Women		PPP	29 February 2024	
Nikhat Shakeel Khan	Reserved seats	Women		MQM–P	29 February 2024	
Sabheen Ghoury	Reserved seats	Women		MQM–P	29 February 2024	
Rana Ansar	Reserved seats	Women		MQM–P	29 February 2024	
Shaista Khan	Reserved seats	Women		PML(N)	29 February 2024	
Shahida Begum	Reserved seats	Women		JUI(F)	29 February 2024	
Izbal Zehri	Reserved seats	Women		PPP	29 February 2024	
Kiran Haider	Reserved seats	Women		PML(N)	29 February 2024	
Akhtar Bibi	Reserved seats	Women		PML(N)	29 February 2024	
Aliya Kamran	Reserved seats	Women		JUI(F)	29 February 2024	
Minorities	Reserved seats					
Minorities	Reserved seats	Kheal Das Kohistani		PML(N)	29 February 2024	
Minorities	Reserved seats	Darshan Punshi		PML(N)	29 February 2024	
Minorities	Reserved seats	Nelson Azeem		PML(N)	29 February 2024	
Minorities	Reserved seats	Isphanyar M. Bhandara		PML(N)	29 February 2024	
Minorities	Reserved seats	Ramesh Lal		PPP	29 February 2024	
Minorities	Reserved seats	Naveed Aamir		PPP	29 February 2024	
Minorities	Reserved seats			Seat suspended due to Reserved seats case		
Minorities	Reserved seats			Seat suspended due to Reserved seats case		
Minorities	Reserved seats			Seat suspended due to Reserved seats case		
