= Arshad Khan Leghari =

Pakistani politician

Muhammad Arshad Khan Leghari
- محمد ارشد خان لغاری

Minister of State for Industries and Production
- In office 4 August 2017 – 31 May 2018
- President: Mamnoon Hussain
- Prime Minister: Shahid Khaqan Abbasi

Member of the National Assembly of Pakistan
- In office 2008 – 31 May 2018
- Constituency: NA-197 (Rahim Yar Khan-VI)

Personal details
- Born: January 1, 1960 (age 66) Rahim Yar Khan, Punjab, Pakistan
- Party: Pakistan Muslim League (N) (2013-2025)
- Relations: Azhar Laghari (brother)

Muhammad Arshad Khan Leghari (Urdu: محمد ارشد خان لغاری; born 1 January 1960) is a Pakistani politician who served as Minister of State for Industries and Production, in Abbasi cabinet from August 2017 to May 2018. He had been a member of the National Assembly of Pakistan, from 2008 to May 2018.

== Early life ==
He was born on 1 January 1960 in Rahim Yar Khan.

== Political career ==
He ran for the seat of the Provincial Assembly of Punjab as a candidate of Pakistan Muslim League (Q) (PML-Q) from Constituency PP-297 (Rahim Yar Khan-XIII) in the 2002 Pakistani general election. He received 21,863 votes and lost the seat to Aziz Aslam Shaikh.

He was elected to the National Assembly of Pakistan as a candidate of Pakistan Muslim League (N) (PML-N) from Constituency NA-197 (Rahim Yar Khan-VI) in the 2008 Pakistani general election. He received 82,565 votes and defeated Rais Munir Ahmad, a candidate of the Pakistan People's Party (PPP). In the same election, he ran for the seat of the Provincial Assembly of Punjab as a candidate of Sindh United Party (SUP) from Constituency PP-295 (Rahim Yar Khan-XI) but was unsuccessful. He received 89 votes and lost the seat to Makhdoom Ahmed Mehmood. In the same election, he also ran for the seat of the Provincial Assembly of Punjab as an independent candidate from Constituency PP-297 (Rahim Yar Khan-XIII) but was unsuccessful. He received 425 votes and lost the seat to Rais Ibraheem Khalil Ahmad, a candidate of the PPP.

He was re-elected to the National Assembly as a candidate of PML-N from Constituency NA-197 (Rahim Yar Khan-VI) in the 2013 Pakistani general election. He received 80,944 votes and defeated Makhdoom Syed Murtaza Mehmood, a candidate of the PPP.

Following the election of Shahid Khaqan Abbasi as Prime Minister of Pakistan in August 2017, he was inducted into the federal cabinet of Abbasi. He was appointed the Minister of State for Industries and Production. Upon the dissolution of the National Assembly on the expiration of its term on 31 May 2018, Leghari ceased to hold the office as Minister of State for Industries and Production.

He ran for the seat of the National Assembly as a candidate of the PML(N) from NA-180 Rahim Yar Khan-VI in the 2018 Pakistani general election, but was unsuccessful. He received 55,085 votes and was defeated by Makhdoom Syed Murtaza Mehmood, a candidate of the PPP.
