= Afzal Khokhar =

Pakistani politician

- افضل کھوکھر

Member of the National Assembly of Pakistan
- Incumbent
- Assumed office 29 February 2024
- Constituency: NA-125 Lahore-IX
- In office 13 August 2018 – 10 August 2023
- Constituency: NA-136 (Lahore-XIV)
- In office 2008 – 31 May 2018
- Constituency: NA-128 (Lahore-XI)

Member of the Provincial Assembly of the Punjab
- In office 2002–2007
- Constituency: PP-160 Lahore-XXIV

Personal details
- Born: 6 April 1974 (age 52)
- Party: PMLN (2002-present)
- Relations: Saif ul Malook Khokhar (brother); Faisal Ayub Khokhar (nephew)

Muhammad Afzal Khokhar (Urdu: محمد افضل کھوکر; born 6 April 1974) is a Pakistani politician who has been a member of the National Assembly of Pakistan since February 2024 and previously served in this position from August 2018 till August 2023 and from 2008 to May 2018. He was a member of the Provincial Assembly of Punjab from 2002 to 2007.

== Early life and education ==
He was born on 6 April 1974. He graduated from the University of the Punjab in 1997 and obtained the degree of Bachelor of Arts from there.

== Political career ==
Khokhar was elected to the Provincial Assembly of Punjab as a candidate of Pakistan Muslim League (N) (PML-N) from Constituency PP-160 (Lahore-XXIV) in the 2002 Pakistani general election. He received 18,374 votes and defeated Malik Karamat Khokhar, a candidate of Pakistan Muslim League (Q) (PML-Q).

He was elected to the National Assembly of Pakistan as a candidate of PML-N from Constituency NA-128 (Lahore-XI) in the 2008 Pakistani general election. He received 65,727 votes and defeated Malik Karamat Khokhar, a candidate of Pakistan Peoples Party (PPP).

He was re-elected to the National Assembly as a candidate of PML-N from Constituency NA-128 (Lahore-XI) in the 2013 Pakistani general election. He received 124,107 votes and defeated Malik Karamat Khokhar, a candidate of Pakistan Tehreek-e-Insaf (PTI).

He was re-elected to the National Assembly as a candidate of PML-N from Constituency NA-136 (Lahore-XIV) in the 2018 Pakistani general election. He received 88,831 votes and defeated Malik Asad Ali Khokhar, a candidate of PTI.

He was re-elected to the National Assembly as a candidate of PML-N from NA-125 Lahore-IX in the 2024 Pakistani general election. He received 65,102 votes and defeated Javaid Umar, an Independent politician candidate supported by (PTI) Pakistan Tehreek-e-Insaf .
