= NA-128 =

NA-128 may refer to:

- NA-128 (Lahore-VI), a constituency for the National Assembly of Pakistan
- NA-128 (Lahore-XI), a former constituency for the National Assembly of Pakistan
