= Hamid Saeed Kazmi =

Pakistani politician

Syed Hamid Saeed Kazmi
- سید حامد سعید کاظمی

28th Minister for Religious Affairs and Inter-faith Harmony
- In office 14 November 2008 – 14 December 2010
- President: Asif Ali Zardari
- Prime Minister: Yusuf Raza Gillani
- Preceded by: Khurshid Shah
- Succeeded by: Khurshid Shah

Personal details
- Born: 3 October 1957 (age 69)
- Party: TLP (2025-present)
- Other political affiliations: PPP (1992-2022: 2025); PTI (2022); IND (2018)
- Children: 4
- Parent: Ahmad Saeed Kazmi (Father)
- Education: Bahauddin Zakariya University

Syed Hamid Saeed Kazmi (Urdu: سید حامد سعید کاظمی; born 3 October 1957) is a Pakistani politician who was the 28th Federal Minister for Religious Affairs of Pakistan from 2008 to 2010 as part of the Pakistan People's Party government. He hails from Multan.

== Family ==
Kazmi was born in a well-to-do religious family. His father, Ahmad Saeed Kazmi, was a prominent Sufi and Islamic scholar. He is one among eleven siblings. Kazmi is married and has two daughters and two sons. His father Syed Ahmad Saeed Kazmi son of Syed Muhammad Mukhtar Ahmad Shah Kazmi belonged to Amroha, India. They migrated to Multan in 1935. The family relates with Imam Musa Kazim through 35 steps, and this is why he is called Kazmi.

== Education ==
He obtained a Master of Arts degree in Urdu with Gold Medal from the Bahauddin Zakariya University in 1985.

== Political career ==
He was elected to the National Assembly as a candidate of the Pakistan People's Party (PPP) from NA-192 Rahim Yar Khan-I in the 2008 Pakistani general election. He received 65,395 votes and defeated Makhdoom Syed Ahmad Alam Anwar of the Pakistan Muslim League (Q) (PML(Q)).

Kazmi was sentenced to sixteen years imprisonment on the basis of charges of corruption by a lower court. The lower court has written in its 87 pages of decision that Hamid Kazmi was not found corrupt at any level but as he was the head of the ministry and by him mismanagement was done. But he appealed against it in the Islamabad High Court. On 20 March 2017, he was acquitted in the Hajj corruption scandal, along with former ex-DG, Hajj Rao Shakeel, and Joint secretary for Religious Affairs, Aftab Aslam.

He turned down a request from Asif Ali Zardari to contest against Shah Mahmood Qureshi, the vice chairman of the Pakistan Tehreek-e-Insaf (PTI), as a candidate of the PPP from NA-156 Multan-III in the 2018 Pakistani general election. He instead opted to run as an independent from NA-175 Rahim Yar Khan-I.

He ran for the National Assembly as an independent candidate from NA-175 Rahim Yar Khan-I in the 2018 Pakistani general election, but was unsuccessful. He received 39,514 votes and was defeated by Syed Mobeen Ahmed, a candidate of the PTI.

He joined the PTI on 15 June 2022.

== Assassination attempt ==
He is a critic of the Pakistani Taliban. On 2 September 2009, while he was the Federal Minister for Religious Affairs, Kazmi survived an assassination attempt by suspected Taliban gunmen. He was shot by motorcycle borne gunmen as he was leaving his office. His driver and guard were killed in the attack.
