= Khwaja Ghulam Rasool Koreja =

Pakistani politician

- خواجہ غلام رسول کوریجہ

Member of the National Assembly of Pakistan
- In office 1 June 2013 – 31 May 2018
- Constituency: NA-192 (Rahim Yar Khan-I)

Personal details
- Born: October 21, 1970 (age 55) Liaquatpur, Rahim Yar Khan District, Punjab, Pakistan
- Party: PPP (2013-2022; 2023-present)
- Other political affiliations: PTI (2022-2023)

Khwaja Ghulam Rasool Koreja (Urdu: خواجہ غلام رسول کوریجہ; born 21 October 1970) is a Pakistani politician who served as a member of the National Assembly of Pakistan, from June 2013 to May 2018.

== Early life ==
He was born on 21 October 1970.

== Political career ==
He was elected to the National Assembly of Pakistan as a candidate of Pakistan Peoples Party (PPP) from Constituency NA-192 (Rahim Yar Khan-I) in the 2013 Pakistani general election. He received 80,823 votes and defeated Makhdoom Syed Ahmed Alam Anwar, a candidate of Pakistan Muslim League (N) (PML-N).

In October 2017, he was appointed as chairperson of the standing committees of the National Assembly on narcotics control. Mr. Syed Mobeen Ahmed from Pakistan Tehreek-e-Insaf (PTI) defeated him in the 2018 Pakistani general election by 8000 votes. Mr. Ghulam Rasool left the PPP in August 2022. He met Imran Khan on 15 September 2022, and formally joined the PTI.

He left the PTI and rejoined the PPP on 31 May 2023 due to the 2023 Pakistani protests.
