= Syed Amir Ali Shah Jamote =

Pakistani politician (1948–2023)

- سيد امير علي شاھ ڄاموٽ

Member of the National Assembly of Pakistan
- In office 2002 – 31 May 2018
- Constituency: NA-221 (Hyderabad-cum-Matiari)

Personal details
- Born: 18 January 1948
- Died: 2 October 2023 (aged 75) Hyderabad, Sindh, Pakistan
- Party: Pakistan Peoples Party
- Children: Syed Hussain Tariq (son)

Syed Amir Ali Shah Jamote (Sindhi: سيد امير علي شاھ ڄاموٽ; Urdu: سید امیر علی شاہ جاموٹ; 18 January 1948 – 2 October 2023) was a Pakistani politician who had been a member of the National Assembly of Pakistan, from 2002 to May 2018.

== Life and career ==
Syed Amir Ali Shah Jamote was born on 18 January 1941.

Jamote was elected to the National Assembly of Pakistan as a candidate of Pakistan Peoples Party (PPP) from Constituency NA-221 (Hyderabad-IV) in the 2002 Pakistani general election. He received 44,899 votes and defeated Syed Shahabuddin Shah, a candidate of Pakistan Muslim League (Q) (PML-Q).

Jamote was re-elected to the National Assembly as a candidate of PPP from Constituency NA-221 (Hyderabad-cum-Matiari) in the 2008 Pakistani general election. He received 102,737 votes and defeated Hussaini Shahabuddin Shah, a candidate of PML-Q.

Jamote was re-elected to the National Assembly as a candidate of PPP from Constituency NA-221 (Hyderabad-cum-Matiari) in the 2013 Pakistani general election. He received 59,821 votes and defeated Rajab Ali, a candidate of Sindh Taraqi Pasand Party.

Syed Ameer Ali Shah Jamote died in Hyderabad, Sindh on 2 October 2023, at the age of 75. He was buried in his native village Matiari.
