= NA-178 =

NA-178 may refer to:

- NA-178 (Muzaffargarh-III), a former constituency of the National Assembly of Pakistan
- NA-178 (Rahim Yar Khan-IV), a constituency of the National Assembly of Pakistan
