= Haji Abdul Sattar =

Pakistani politician (1950–2025)

Haji Abdul Sattar Bachani

Member of the National Assembly of Pakistan
- In office 1 June 2013 – 31 May 2018
- Constituency: NA-223 (Tando Allahyar-cum-Matiari)

Personal details
- Born: 13 August 1950
- Died: 5 July 2025 (aged 74) Karachi, Sindh, Pakistan
- Party: Pakistan Peoples Party
- Children: Zulfiqar Sattar Bachani (son)

Haji Abdul Sattar Bachani (Sindhi: حاجي عبدالستار بڇاڻي; Urdu: حاجی عبدالستار بچانی; 13 August 1950 – 5 July 2025) was a Pakistani politician who was a member of the National Assembly of Pakistan from June 2013 to May 2018.

== Political career ==
Haji Abdul Sattar Bachani had a distinguished political career. Since 1977, he had served as both a Member of the National Assembly (MNA) and a Member of the Provincial Assembly of Sindh (MPA). He also held the position of PPP Hyderabad Division President and remained a core strategist in party affairs. His wife had also served as an MNA in the past.

Due to his active role during the MRD (Movement for the Restoration of Democracy), Bachani had been sentenced to flogging under General Zia ul Haq's martial law.

Most recently, Sattar was elected to the National Assembly of Pakistan as a candidate of Pakistan Peoples Party (PPP) from Constituency NA-223 (Tando Allahyar-cum-Matiari) in the 2013 Pakistani general election. He received 91,956 votes and defeated Rahila Gul Magsi, a candidate of Pakistan Muslim League (N) (PML-N).

== Death ==
Sattar died after a long illness in Karachi, on 5 July 2025, at the age of 74.
