= Shamshad Sattar Bachani =

Pakistani politician

Member of the National Assembly of Pakistan
- In office 2002–2013
- Constituency: NA-223 (Tando Allahyar-cum-Matiari)

Shamshad Sattar Bachani (Sindhi: شمشاد ستار بڇاڻي) is a Pakistani politician who was a member of the National Assembly of Pakistan from 2002 to 2013.

== Political career ==
She was elected to the National Assembly of Pakistan from Constituency NA-223 (Hyderabad-VI) as a candidate of Pakistan Peoples Party (PPP) in the 2002 Pakistani general election. She received 50,624 votes and defeated an independent candidate, Adeeba Gul Magsi.

She was re-elected to the National Assembly from Constituency NA-223 (Tando Allahyar-cum-Matiari) as a candidate of PPP in the 2008 Pakistani general election. She received 84,669 votes and defeated Adeeba Gul Magsi, a candidate of Pakistan Muslim League (Q) (PML-Q).
