= Makhdoom Syed Muhammad Masood Alam =

Pakistani politician

Member of the Provincial Assembly of the Punjab
- In office 29 May 2013 – 31 May 2018
- Constituency: PP-285 Rahim Yar Khan-I

Personal details
- Born: 1 January 1961 (age 65) Muzaffargarh
- Party: Pakistan Muslim League (Nawaz)
- Relations: Syed Mobeen Ahmed (cousin)

Makhdoom Syed Muhammad Masood Alam is a Pakistani politician who was a Member of the Provincial Assembly of the Punjab, from May 2013 to May 2018.

== Early life and education ==
He was born on 1 January 1961 in Muzaffargarh.

He has done graduation.

== Political career ==
He was elected to the Provincial Assembly of the Punjab as a candidate of Pakistan Muslim League (Nawaz) from Constituency PP-285 (Rahimyar Khan-I) in the 2013 Pakistani general election.
