= PP-165 Lahore-XXI =

Constituency of Punjab

- Constituency for the Provincial Assembly of Punjab
- Region: Raiwand Town (partly) of Lahore City in Lahore District

Current constituency
- Created from: PP-160 Lahore-XXIV (2002-2018); PP-164 Lahore-XXI (2018-2023)

PP-165 Lahore-XXI (پی پی-165، لاہور-21) is a Constituency of Provincial Assembly of Punjab.

== General elections 2024 ==
Provincial election 2024: PP-165 Lahore-XXI
Party	Candidate	Votes	%	±%
Independent	Ahmer Bhatti (Note: Filed nomination papers as PTI candidate but ECP allowed him to run as an Independent)	29,390	37.97	
PML(N)	Shahzad Nazir	28,427	36.73	
TLP	Muhammad Irfan	10,819	13.98	
PPP	Safdar Dilshad	4,330	5.59	
Others	Others (eighteen candidates)	4,432	5.73	
Turnout		79,406	49.42	
Total valid votes		77,398	97.47	
Rejected ballots		2,008	2.53	
Majority		963	1.24	
Registered electors		160,684		
hold				

== General elections 2018 ==
Provincial election 2018: PP-164 Lahore-XXI
Party	Candidate	Votes	%	±%
PML(N)	Mian Muhammad Shehbaz Sharif	40,086	48.43	
PTI	Yousaf Ali	19,218	23.22	
PPP	Tahir Majeed	13,400	16.19	
TLP	Maryum Azhar	2,856	3.45	
TLI	Ch. Zaheer Ud Din	2,714	3.28	
MMA	Muhammad Nazir	1,404	1.70	
Independent	Ameer Ahmed	1,304	1.58	
Others	Others (fourteen candidates)	1,787	2.15	
Turnout		84,591	61.65	
Total valid votes		82,769	97.85	
Rejected ballots		1,822	2.15	
Majority		20,868	25.21	
Registered electors		137,214		

== General elections 2013 ==
Provincial election 2013: PP-160 Lahore-XXIV
Party	Candidate	Votes	%	±%
PML(N)	Malik Saif Ul Malook Khokhar	71,677	47.93	
PTI	Malik Zaheer Abbass Khokhar	59,486	39.78	
JI	Malik Jahangir Hussain Bara	10,714	7.16	
PPP	Ch. Tariq Mehmood Sindhu	4,332	2.90	
Independent	Allama Muhammad Abid Jalali	1,656	1.11	
Others	Others (thirty one candidates)	1,679	1.12	
Turnout		151,542	50.88	
Total valid votes		149,544	98.68	
Rejected ballots		1,998	1.32	
Majority		12,191	8.15	
Registered electors		297,850		

== General elections 2008 ==
Contesting candidates	Party affiliation	Votes polled

== See also ==
- PP-164 Lahore-XX
- PP-166 Lahore-XXII
