= Ghulam Farid Kathia =

Pakistani politician

Member of the National Assembly of Pakistan
- In office 2008–2013
- Constituency: NA-161 (Sahiwal-II)

Personal details
- Party: TLP (2025-present)
- Other political affiliations: PPP (2002-2025)

Ghulam Farid Kathia is a Pakistani politician who had been a member of the National Assembly of Pakistan from 2008 to 2013.

== Political career ==
He ran for the seat of the National Assembly of Pakistan as a candidate of Pakistan Peoples Party (PPP) from NA-161 (Sahiwal-II) in the 2002 Pakistani general election but was unsuccessful. He received 33,016 votes and lost the seat to Rana Tariq Javed, a candidate Pakistan Shia Political Party.

He was elected to the National Assembly from NA-161 (Sahiwal-II) as a candidate of PPP in the 2008 Pakistani general election. He received 38,962 votes and defeated Chaudhry Muhammad Ashraf, a candidate of Pakistan Democratic Party. In November 2008, he was inducted into the federal cabinet of Prime Minister Yousaf Raza Gillani and was appointed as Minister of State for Education where he continued to serve until February 2011.

He ran for the seat of the National Assembly from NA-161 (Sahiwal-II) as a candidate of PPP in the 2013 Pakistani general election but was unsuccessful. He received 10,894 votes and lost the seat to Chaudhry Muhammad Ashraf.
