= Ahmad Saeed Kazmi =

Sunni Islamic Scholar, Sufi (1913–1986)

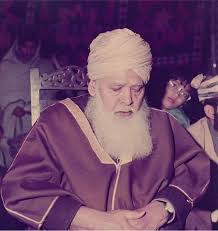
- Title: Ghazaali e Zamaan; Raazi e Dauraan

Personal life
- Born: 13 March 1913 Amroha, India
- Died: 4 June 1986 (aged 73)
- Resting place: Multan
- Children: Hamid Saeed Kazmi (former Federal Minister in Pakistan); Peer Mazhar Saeed Kazmi; Syed Arshad Saeed Kazmi
- Region: South Asia
- Education: Madrasa Mohammadiya, Amroha
- Known for: Pakistan Movement activist Urdu translation and Tafseer of Quran; Dars-e-Hadith

Religious life
- Religion: Islam
- Denomination: Sunni
- Jurisprudence: Hanafi
- Tariqa: Qadri
- Creed: Maturidi
- Movement: Barelvi

Syed Ahmad Saeed Kazmi (13 March 1913 – 4 June 1986, Urdu: سید احمد سعید کاظمی) was a Pakistani Islamic scholar and Sufi who belonged to the Barelvi movement of Sunni Islam.

== Early life and education ==
Ahmed Saeed Kazmi was born to Syed Muhammad Mukhtaar Ahmad Shah Kazmi in Amroha, Uttar Pradesh. He got his basic education from his mother. Later on his uncle gave him Sanad-e-Hadith and spiritual education which polished his God-gifted qualities.

He migrated to Multan in 1935 from Amroha (Moradabad). Kazmi had six sons and six daughters including Hamid Saeed Kazmi, former fedral minister in the cabinet of Pakistani Prime Minister Yousaf Raza Gillani.

Ahmad Saeed Kazmi is known for his contribution to the Pakistan Movement, Urdu translation and Tafseer of Quran, and Dars-e-Hadith.

Ahmad Saeed Kazmi's family reportedly relates with 8th century Imam Musa al-Kazim (745 – 799) through 35 steps, and this is why the family is called Kazmi.

=== Shrine ===
His tomb sits next to Multan's 18th century Shahi Eid Gah Mosque.

== Pakistan movement activist ==
Ahmad Saeed Kazmi took part in All India Sunni Conference in Benaras, British India in1946. After returning from this conference, he started vigorously supporting the Pakistan Movement.

== Publications ==
- Al Bayan, Urdu Translation of Holy Quran published by Kazmi Publications, Multan
- Maqalat e Kazmi (4 Volumes)
- Al-Tibyan tafseer of 1st para of holy Quran
- التبیان العظیم فی تفسیر سورۃ التحریم
- تسبیح الرحمان عن الکذب والنقصان
- تسکین الخواطر فی مسئلۃ الحاضر والناظر
- Meraj-un-Nabi

== See also ==
- Syed Shujaat Ali Qadri
- Ilyas Qadri
- Jamaat Ahle Sunnat
- Muhammad Muslehuddin Siddiqui
