= Shahi Eid Gah Mosque =

Mosque in Multan, Punjab, Pakistan

- شاہی عید گاہ مسجد
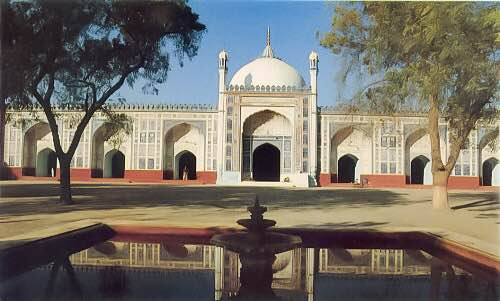

Religion
- Affiliation: Islam
- Ecclesiastical or organisational status: Mosque

Location
- Location: Multan, Punjab, Pakistan
- Interactive map of Shahi Eid Gah Mosque
- Coordinates: 30.2107936°N 71.4789388°E

Architecture
- Type: Mosque
- Style: Indo-Islamic/Mughal
- Completed: 1735
- Dome: 7

The Shahi Eid Gah (Urdu: شاہی عید گاہ مسجد) is an early 18th-century mosque located in Multan, southern Punjab.

== Location ==
The mosque is located on the main Multan-Lahore highway in the northeast of the oldest part of the city. The mosque is adjacent to the 20th-century Sufi shrine of Ahmad Saeed Kazmi.

== History ==
=== Founding ===
The mosque was built in 1735 CE during the reign of Mughal Emperor Muhammad Shah. The mosque was funded by Nawab Abdul Samad Khan, who was the Mughal governor of Multan.

=== British ===
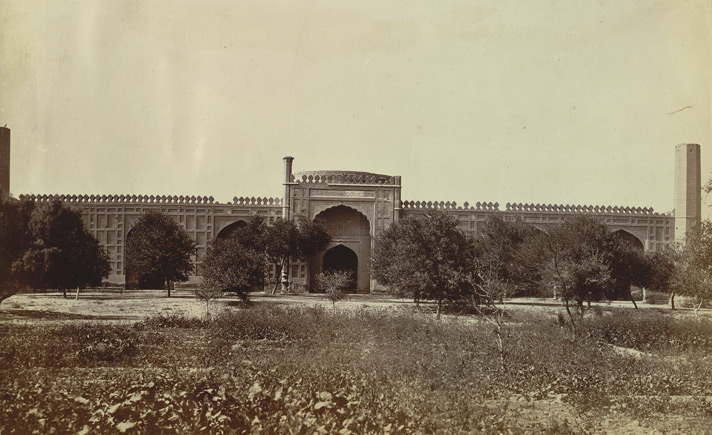
The mosque pictured sometime between 1864 and 1866.

The mosque was used as a court during the early British period in Multan. It was restored and returned to its original purpose in 1891 at the insistence of Deputy Commissioner H.C. Cookson.

=== Modern ===
After the independence of Pakistan, the courtyard was expanded to accommodate more worshippers.

== Architecture ==
The mosque is spacious, with a vast courtyard and a prayer chamber measuring 250 feet by 54 feet, and features seven domes.

The mosque's exterior is embellished with glazed blue Multan-style tiles, while the interior is ornamented with intricate mosaics.

== See also ==
- Islam in Pakistan
