= Azhar Laghari =

Member of the National Assembly of Pakistan from Rahim Yar Khan (2024–2029)

- اظہر لغاری

Member of the National Assembly of Pakistan
- Incumbent
- Assumed office 29 February 2024
- Constituency: NA-174 Rahim Yar Khan-VI

Personal details
- Party: PMLN (2024-present)
- Relations: Arshad Khan Leghari (brother)

Sardar Muhammad Azhar Khan Laghari (Urdu: سردار محمد اظہر خان لغاری) is a Pakistani politician who has been a member of the National Assembly of Pakistan since February 2024.

== Political career ==
Laghari was elected to the National Assembly of Pakistan in the 2024 Pakistani general election from NA-174 Rahim Yar Khan-VI as a candidate of Pakistan Muslim League (N). He received 78,680 votes while runner-up candidate Syed Usman Mehmood, a candidate of Pakistan People’s Party (PPP), received 71,559 votes.
