= Makhdoom Syed Murtaza Mehmood =

Pakistani politician

Federal Minister for Industries
- In office 19 April 2022 – 10 August 2023
- Preceded by: Khusro Bakhtiar

Member of the National Assembly of Pakistan
- Incumbent
- Assumed office 29 February 2024
- Constituency: NA-169 Rahim Yar Khan-I
- In office 13 August 2018 – 10 August 2023
- Preceded by: Arshad Khan Leghari
- Constituency: NA-180 (Rahim Yar Khan-VI)

Member of the Provincial Assembly of the Punjab
- In office 29 May 2013 – 31 May 2018
- Constituency: PP-295 Rahim Yar Khan-XI

Personal details
- Born: 19 April 1984 (age 41) Rahim Yar Khan, Punjab, Pakistan
- Party: PPP (2013-present)
- Relations: Mustafa Mehmood (brother)
- Parent: Makhdoom Ahmed Mehmood (father)

Makhdoom Syed Murtaza Mehmood (Urdu: مخدوم سید مرتضی محمود) is a Pakistani politician who has been a member of the National Assembly of Pakistan since February 2024 and previously served in this position from August 2018 till August 2023. Previously he was a Member of the Provincial Assembly of the Punjab, from May 2013 to May 2018. He was sworn in as the Federal Minister for Industries in the coalition government of Shahbaz Sharif on the 19th of April 2022.

== Early life and education ==
He was born on 19 April 1985.

He has the degree of Bachelor of Arts (Hons) in Economics. Now he is won the election Na 169 8 February 2024

== Political career ==
He was elected to the Provincial Assembly of the Punjab as a candidate of Pakistan Peoples Party (PPP) from PP-295 (Rahimyar Khan-XI) in the 2013 Pakistani general election.

He was elected to the National Assembly of Pakistan as a candidate of PPP from NA-180 (Rahim Yar Khan-VI) in the 2018 Pakistani general election.

He was re-elected to the National Assembly as a candidate of PPP from NA-169 Rahim Yar Khan-I in the 2024 Pakistani general election. He received 81,187 votes and defeated Syed Mobeen Ahmed, a candidate of Pakistan Muslim League (N) (PML(N)).

== More Reading ==
- List of members of the 15th National Assembly of Pakistan
- List of Pakistan Tehreek-e-Insaf elected members (2013–2018)
- No-confidence motion against Imran Khan
