= Makhdoom Syed Mustafa Mehmood =

Pakistani politician

- مصطفٰی محمود

Member of the National Assembly of Pakistan
- Incumbent
- Assumed office 29 February 2024
- Constituency: NA-173 Rahim Yar Khan-V
- In office 13 August 2018 – 10 August 2023
- Constituency: NA-178 (Rahim Yar Khan-IV)
- In office 14 March 2012 – 31 May 2018
- Constituency: NA-195 (Rahim Yar Khan-IV)

Personal details
- Born: June 29, 1986 (age 39) Rahim Yar Khan, Punjab, Pakistan
- Party: PPP (2013-present)
- Other political affiliations: PML(F) (2005-2013)
- Relations: Makhdoom Syed Murtaza Mehmood (brother)
- Parent: Makhdoom Ahmed Mehmood (father)

Makhdoom Syed Mustafa Mehmood (Urdu: مخدوم سید مصطفی محمود; born 29 June 1986) is a Pakistani politician who has been a member of the National Assembly of Pakistan since February 2024 and previously served in this position from August 2018 till August 2023 and from March 2012 to May 2018.

== Political career ==
He was elected to the National Assembly of Pakistan as a candidate of Pakistan Muslim League (F) (PML-F) from NA-195 (Rahim Yar Khan-IV) in a by-election held in February 2012. He received 81,745 votes and defeated an independent candidate, Tariq Chohan.

He was re-elected to the National Assembly as a candidate of Pakistan Peoples Party (PPP) from NA-195 (Rahim Yar Khan-IV) in the 2013 Pakistani general election. He received 97,778 votes and defeated Khusro Bakhtiar.

He was re-elected to the National Assembly as a candidate of PPP from NA-178 (Rahim Yar Khan-IV) in the 2018 Pakistani general election.

He was again re-elected to the National Assembly as a candidate of PPP from NA-173 Rahim Yar Khan-V in the 2024 Pakistani general election. He received votes and defeated Mohammad Nabeel Dahir, an Independent politician candidate supported by Pakistan Tehreek-e-Insaf (PTI).
