= NA-174 Rahim Yar Khan-VI =

Constituency of the National Assembly of Pakistan

- Constituency for the National Assembly of Pakistan
- Region: Sadiqabad Tehsil (partly) including Sadiqabad City of Rahim Yar Khan District
- Electorate: 503,390

Current constituency
- Party: Pakistan Muslim League (N)
- Member: Azhar Laghari
- Created from: NA-197 Rahim Yar Khan-VI

NA-174 Rahim Yar Khan-VI (این اے-174، رحیم یار خان-6) is a constituency for the National Assembly of Pakistan.

== Election 2002 ==
General elections were held on 10 October 2002. Rais Munir Ahmed of PPP won by 79,039 votes.

General election 2002: NA-197 Rahim Yar Khan-VI
Party	Candidate	Votes	%	±%
PPP	Rais Munir Ahmed	79,039	60.45	
PML(Q)	Rais Wazeer Ahmad	43,192	33.03	
MMA	Ch. Muhammad Ishtiaque	7,475	5.72	
Others	Others (two candidates)	1,051	0.80	
Turnout		133,277	50.14	
Total valid votes		130,757	98.11	
Rejected ballots		2,520	1.89	
Majority		35,847	27.42	
Registered electors		265,809		

== Election 2008 ==
General elections were held on 18 February 2008. Arshad Khan Leghari of PML-N won by 82,565 votes.

General election 2008: NA-197 Rahim Yar Khan-VI
Party	Candidate	Votes	%	±%
PML(N)	Sardar Muhammad Arshad Khan Laghari	82,565	58.58	
PML(Q)	Rais Munir Ahmed	53,983	38.30	
Others	Others (five candidates)	4,386	3.12	
Turnout		146,042	41.48	
Total valid votes		140,934	96.50	
Rejected ballots		5,108	3.50	
Majority		28,582	20.28	
Registered electors		352,085		
PML(N) gain from PPP				

== Election 2013 ==
General elections were held on 11 May 2013. Arshad Khan Leghari won by 80,944 votes and became the member of National Assembly.

General election 2013: NA-197 Rahim Yar Khan-VI
Party	Candidate	Votes	%	±%
PML(N)	Sardar Muhammad Arshad Khan Laghari	80,944	42.36	
PPP	Makhddom Syed Murtaza Mehmood	67,728	35.45	
PTI	Sardar Rafique Haider Khan Laghari	31,648	16.56	
Others	Others (fourteen candidates)	10,751	5.63	
Turnout		196,999	59.88	
Total valid votes		191,071	96.99	
Rejected ballots		5,928	3.01	
Majority		13,216	6.91	
Registered electors		328,977		
PML(N) hold				

== Election 2018 ==
General elections were held on 25 July 2018.

General election 2018: NA-180 Rahim Yar Khan-VI
Party	Candidate	Votes	%	±%
PPP	Makhdoom Syed Murtaza Mehmood	72,062	32.59	
PML(N)	Sardar Muhammad Arshad Khan Leghari	55,085	24.91	
PTI	Sardar Rafique Haider Khan Leghari	46,621	21.08	
Independent	Nadeem Abbas Cheema	37,298	16.87	
TLP	Nazim Hussain Saeed	4,717	2.13	
AAT	Tahir Ali	1,558	0.70	
Independent	Sagheer Abbas	1,036	0.47	
PTI-N	Muhammad Akram	856	0.39	
Independent	Muhammad Safdar Khan Laghari	705	0.32	
Independent	Muhammad Arshad	629	0.28	
Independent	Hafiz Asif Rasheed	427	0.19	
Independent	Chaudhary Muhammad Shafique Anwar	126	0.06	
Turnout		228,325	59.03	
Total valid votes		221,120	96.84	
Rejected ballots		7,205	3.16	
Majority		16,977	7.68	
Registered electors		386,772		
PPP gain from PML(N)				

== Election 2024 ==
General elections were held on 8 February 2024. Azhar Laghari won the election with 78,680 votes.

General election 2024: NA-174 Rahim Yar Khan-VI
Party	Candidate	Votes	%	±%
PML(N)	Azhar Laghari	78,680	30.84	▲5.93
PPP	Syed Usman Mehmood	71,559	28.05	▼4.54
PTI	Rais Muhammad Mehboob Ahmed (Note: Filed nomination papers as PTI candidate but ECP allowed him to run as an Independent)	67,358	26.40	▲5.32
Independent	Nadeem Abbas Cheema	16,802	6.59	▼10.28
Others	Others (ten candidates)	20,723	8.12	
Turnout		262,106	52.07	▼6.96
Total valid votes		255,122	97.34	
Rejected ballots		6,984	2.66	
Majority		7,121	2.79	
Registered electors		503,390		
PML(N) gain from PTI				

== See also ==
- NA-173 Rahim Yar Khan-V
- NA-175 Muzaffargarh-I
