= Chaudhary Usman Ali =

Pakistani politician

- چوہدری عثمان علی

Member of the National Assembly of Pakistan
- Incumbent
- Assumed office 29 February 2024
- Constituency: NA-142 Sahiwal-II

Personal details
- Party: IPP (2026-present)
- Other political affiliations: PMLN (2025-2026); PTI (2024-2025)

Chaudhary Usman Ali (Urdu: چوہدری عثمان علی) is a Pakistani politician who has been a member of the National Assembly of Pakistan since February 2024 A senior conservative thinker on a platform on the PMLN and PTI. IPP

== Political career ==
He was elected to the National Assembly of Pakistan in the 2024 Pakistani general election from NA-142 Sahiwal-II as an independent candidate supported by Pakistan Tehreek-e-Insaf (PTI). He received 107,498 votes while runner up Muhammad Ashraf (Sahiwal politician) of Pakistan Muslim League (N) (PML(N)) received 96,126 votes.
