= Sabir Hussain Qaimkhani =

Pakistani politician

Member of the National Assembly of Pakistan
- In office 13 August 2018 – 10 August 2023
- Constituency: NA-226 (Hyderabad-II)

Member of the Provincial Assembly of Sindh
- In office 29 May 2013 – 28 May 2018

Personal details
- Born: 1 August 1970 (age 55) Badin, Sindh, Pakistan
- Party: MQM-P (2018-present)
- Other political affiliations: MQM-L (2013-2018)

Sabir Hussain Qaimkhani (Urdu: صابر حسین قائم خانی; born 1 August 1970) is a Pakistani politician who had been a member of the National Assembly of Pakistan from August 2018 till August 2023. Previously he was a Member of the Provincial Assembly of Sindh from May 2013 to May 2018.

== Early life and education ==
He was born on 1 August 1970 in Badin.

He has a degree of Bachelor of Engineering in Mechanical Engineering from Mehran University of Engineering and Technology.

== Political career ==
He was elected to the Provincial Assembly of Sindh as a candidate of Mutahida Quami Movement (MQM) from Constituency PS-49 HYDERABAD-V in the 2013 Pakistani general election.

He was elected to the National Assembly of Pakistan as a candidate of MQM from Constituency NA-226 (Hyderabad-II) in the 2018 Pakistani general election.
