= Malik Saif ul Malook Khokhar =

Pakistani politician

Member of the National Assembly of Pakistan
- Incumbent
- Assumed office 29 February 2024
- Constituency: NA-126 Lahore-X

Member of the Provincial Assembly of the Punjab
- In office 15 August 2018 – 14 January 2023
- Constituency: PP-165 Lahore-XXII
- In office 2010 – 31 May 2018
- Constituency: PP-160 (Lahore-XXIV)

Personal details
- Born: 18 June 1967 (age 59) Lahore, Punjab, Pakistan
- Party: PMLN (2010-present)
- Relations: Afzal Khokhar (brother)
- Children: Faisal Ayub Khokhar (son)

Malik Saif ul Malook Khokhar is a Pakistani businessman and politician who has been a member of the National Assembly of Pakistan since February 2024. He was a member of the Provincial Assembly of the Punjab, from 2010 to May 2018 and from August 2018 to January 2023.

== Early life ==
Malik Saif-ul-Malook Khokar was born on 18 June 1967 in Lahore. His father's name is Malik Muhammad Ayub Khokhar .

== Political career ==
He was elected to the Provincial Assembly of the Punjab as a candidate of Pakistan Muslim League (N) (PML-N) from Constituency PP-160 (Lahore-XXIV) in by-polls held in June 2010. He received 27,798 votes and defeated Malik Zaheer Abbas, a candidate of Pakistan Tehreek-e-Insaf (PTI).

He was re-elected to the Provincial Assembly of the Punjab as a candidate of PML-N from Constituency PP-160 (Lahore-XXIV) in the 2013 Pakistani general election. He received 71,677 votes and defeated Malik Zaheer Abbas, a candidate of PTI.

He was re-elected to the Provincial Assembly of the Punjab as a candidate of PML-N from Constituency PP-165 (Lahore-XXII) in a by-election held on 14 October 2018.

Recently, he was all over the news because of the demolition of Khokhar Palace, the family house of Khokhar Brothers.

His family was said to be financiers of Maryam Nawaz.

He was elected to the National Assembly of Pakistan from NA-126 Lahore-X as a candidate of PML(N) in the 2024 Pakistani general election. He received 67,121 votes and defeated Malik Touqeer Abbas Khokhar, an Independent politician candidate supported by (PTI) Pakistan Tehreek-e-Insaf .
