= Zulfiqar Sattar Bachani =

Pakistani politician

Member of the National Assembly of Pakistan
- Incumbent
- Assumed office 29 February 2024
- Constituency: NA-217 Tando Allahyar
- In office 13 August 2018 – 10 August 2023
- Constituency: NA-224 (Tando Allahyar)

Personal details
- Party: PPP (2018-present)
- Parent: Haji Abdul Sattar (father)

Zulfiqar Sattar Bachani (Sindhi: ذولفقار ستار بڇاڻي) is a Pakistani politician who has been a member of the National Assembly of Pakistan since February 2024 and previously served in this position from August 2018 till August 2023.

== Political career ==
He was elected to the National Assembly of Pakistan from NA-224 (Tando Allahyar) as a candidate of Pakistan Peoples Party (PPP) in the 2018 Pakistani general election. He received 97,147 votes and defeated Muhammad Mohsin, a candidate of the Grand Democratic Alliance (GDA).

He was re-elected to the National Assembly as a candidate of PPP from NA-217 Tando Allahyar in the 2024 Pakistani general election. He received 119,530 votes and defeated Rahila Magsi, a candidate of the GDA.
