= NA-142 Sahiwal-II =

Constituency of the National Assembly of Pakistan

- Constituency for the National Assembly of Pakistan
- Region: Sahiwal Tehsil (partly) including Harappa and Chichawatni Tehsil (partly) of Sahiwal District
- Electorate: 580,075

Current constituency
- Party: PTI
- Member: Chaudhary Usman Ali
- Created from: NA-161 Sahiwal-II

NA-142 Sahiwal-II (این اے-142، ساہِيوال-۲) is a constituency for the National Assembly of Pakistan.

== Election 2002 ==
General elections were held on 10 October 2002. Rana Tariq Javed (independent candidate) won by 42,885 votes. He then joined the Pakistan Muslim League (Q).

General election 2002: NA-161 Sahiwal-II
Party	Candidate	Votes	%	±%
Pakistan Shia Political Party	Rana Tariq Javed	42,855	34.85	
PML(Q)	Chaudhary Muhammad Ashraf	38,207	31.07	
PPP	Ghulam Farid Kathia	33,016	26.85	
PML(N)	Ehsan-Ul-Haq Idrees	8,882	7.23	
Turnout		127,661	47.13	
Total valid votes		122,960	96.32	
Rejected ballots		4,701	3.68	
Majority		4,648	3.78	
Registered electors		270,851		

== Election 2008 ==
General elections were held on 18 February 2008. Ghulam Farid Kathia of PPP won by 38,926 votes.

General election 2008: NA-161 Sahiwal-II
Party	Candidate	Votes	%	±%
PPP	Ghulam Farid Kathia	38,962	30.22	
PDP	Chaudhary Muhammad Ashraf	33,110	25.69	
PML(Q)	Rana Tariq Javed	28,879	22.40	
PML(N)	Ehsan-Ul-Haq Idrees	22,625	17.55	
Others	Others (four candidates)	5,333	4.14	
Turnout		135,013	57.09	
Total valid votes		128,909	95.48	
Rejected ballots		6,104	4.52	
Majority		5,852	4.53	
Registered electors		236,482		
PPP gain from PML(Q)				

== Election 2013 ==
General elections were held on 11 May 2013. Chaudhary Muhammad Ashraf of PML-N won by 94,012 votes and became the member of National Assembly.

General election 2013: NA-161 Sahiwal-II
Party	Candidate	Votes	%	±%
PML(N)	Chaudhary Muhammad Ashraf	94,012	52.32	
PTI	Malik Muhammad Yar Dhakoo	43,646	24.29	
Independent	Rana Tariq Javed	16,110	8.97	
PPP	Ghulam Farid Kathia	10,894	6.06	
Others	Others (twelve candidates)	15,021	8.36	
Turnout		185,504	60.83	
Total valid votes		179,683	96.86	
Rejected ballots		5,821	3.14	
Majority		50,366	28.03	
Registered electors		304,942		
PML(N) gain from PPP				

== Election 2018 ==
General elections were held on 25 July 2018z

General election 2018: NA-148 Sahiwal-II
Party	Candidate	Votes	%	±%
PML(N)	Chaudhary Muhammad Ashraf	129,027	47.85	
PTI	Malik Muhammad Yar Dhakoo	87,848	32.58	
PPP	Ghulam Farid Kathia	18,952	7.03	
TLP	Rai Munsaf Shabeer Ahmed	15,796	5.86	
Independent	Muhammad Tanveer Chaudry	9,592	3.56	
Independent	Sami Minhas	3,472	1.29	
MMA	Umair Javed	2,723	1.01	
APML	Muhammad Amjad	1,203	0.45	
Independent	Malik Muhammad Ramzan	579	0.21	
Awam League	Tariq Aziz	493	0.18	
Turnout		276,501	56.19	
Total valid votes		269,658	97.53	
Rejected ballots		6,843	2.47	
Majority		41,179	15.27	
Registered electors		492,020		

== Election 2024 ==
General elections were held on 8 February 2024. Chaudhary Usman Ali won the election with 107,498 votes.

General election 2024: NA-142 Sahiwal-II
Party	Candidate	Votes	%	±%
PTI	Chaudhary Usman Ali (Note: Filed nomination papers as PTI candidate but ECP allowed him to run as an Independent)	107,498	35.56	▲2.98
PML(N)	Chaudhary Muhammad Ashraf	96,126	31.80	▼16.05
Independent	Ayesha Arshad Khan Lodhi	29,649	9.81	
TLP	Rai Munsaf Shabeer Ahmed	29,349	9.71	▲3.85
PPP	Ghulam Farid Kathia	28,191	9.32	▲2.29
Others	Others (four candidates)	11,513	3.81	
Turnout		311,748	53.74	▼2.45
Total valid votes		302,326	96.98	
Rejected ballots		9,422	3.02	
Majority		11,372	3.76	
Registered electors		580,075		

== See also ==
- NA-141 Sahiwal-I
- NA-143 Sahiwal-III
