= NA-126 Lahore-X =

Constituency of the National Assembly of Pakistan

- Constituency for the National Assembly of Pakistan
- Region: Lahore City area of Lahore District
- Electorate: 349,636

Current constituency
- Created: 2018
- Party: Pakistan Muslim League (N)
- Member: Malik Saif ul Malook Khokhar
- Created from: NA-128 Lahore-XI NA-126 Lahore-IX (2002-2018); NA-135 Lahore-XIII (2018-2023)

NA-126 Lahore-X (این اے-126، لاہور-10) is a newly-created constituency for the National Assembly of Pakistan. It mainly comprises the section of Lahore City Tehsil along Multan Road. It also includes smaller areas of Model Town Tehsil and Raiwind Tehsil.

== Members of Parliament ==
=== 2018–2023: NA-135 Lahore-XIII ===
Election	Member	Party
2018	Malik Karamat Khokhar	PTI

=== 2024–present: NA-126 Lahore-X ===
Election	Member	Party
2024	Malik Saif ul Malook Khokhar	PML(N)

== Election 2018 ==
General elections were held on 25 July 2018.

General election 2018: NA-135 Lahore-XIII
Party	Candidate	Votes	%	±%
PTI	Malik Karamat Khokhar	64,765	47.49	
PML(N)	Malik Saif ul Malook Khokhar	55,431	40.65	
Others	Others (six candidates)	16,179	11.86	
Turnout		138,348	53.94	
Total valid votes		136,375	98.57	
Rejected ballots		1,973	1.43	
Majority		9,334	6.84	
Registered electors		256,481		
PTI win (new seat)				

== Election 2024 ==
General elections were held on 8 February 2024. Malik Saif ul Malook Khokhar won the election with 67,121 votes.

General election 2024: NA-126 Lahore-X
Party	Candidate	Votes	%	±%
PML(N)	Malik Saif ul Malook Khokhar	67,121	44.36	▲3.71
PTI	Malik Touqeer Abbas Khokhar (Note: Filed nomination papers as PTI candidate but ECP allowed him to run as an Independent)	60,506	39.99	▼7.50
Others	Others (seventeen candidates)	23,684	15.65	
Turnout		153,877	44.01	▼9.93
Total valid votes		151,311	98.33	
Rejected ballots		2,566	1.67	
Majority		6,615	4.37	
Registered electors		349,636		
PML(N) gain from PTI				

== See also ==
- NA-125 Lahore-IX
- NA-127 Lahore-XI
