= Abdul Aleem Khanzada =

Member of the National Assembly of Pakistan from Hyderabad (2024–2029)

Prof Engr Abdul Aleem Khanzada Rajput
- عبدالعلیم خانزادہ

Member of the National Assembly of Pakistan
- Incumbent
- Assumed office 29 February 2024
- Constituency: NA-219 Hyderabad-II

Personal details
- Born: Hyderabad, Sindh, Pakistan
- Party: MQM-P (2024-present)

Prof Engr Abdul Aleem Khanzada Rajput (Urdu: عبدالعلیم خانزادہ) is a Pakistani educationist and politician who is member of the National Assembly of Pakistan.

== Political career ==
Khanzada Rajput won the 2024 Pakistani general election from NA-219 Hyderabad-II as a Muttahida Qaumi Movement – Pakistan candidate. He received 55,050 votes while runner up Independent supported (PTI) Pakistan Tehreek-e-Insaf, candidate Mustansar Billah received 38,315 votes.
