= Sofia Saeed Shah =

Member of the National Assembly of Pakistan from Sindh (2024–2029)

- صوفیہ سعید شاہ

Member of the National Assembly of Pakistan
- Incumbent
- Assumed office 29 February 2024
- Constituency: Reserved seat for women

Personal details
- Born: Karachi, Sindh, Pakistan
- Party: MQM-P (2024-present)

Sofia Saeed Shah (Urdu: صوفیہ سعید شاہ) is a Pakistani politician who is member of the National Assembly of Pakistan.

== Political career ==
Shah was allotted a reserved seat for women in National Assembly of Pakistan after 2024 Pakistani general election as part of the reserved quota for Muttahida Qaumi Movement – Pakistan from Sindh.
