= Chaudhary Muhammad Ashraf =

Pakistani politician (1935–2026)

Chaudhry Muhammad Ashraf
- چوہدری محمد اشرف

Member of the National Assembly of Pakistan
- In office 13 August 2018 – 10 August 2023
- Constituency: NA-148 (Sahiwal-II)
- In office 1 June 2013 – 31 May 2018
- Constituency: NA-161 (Sahiwal-II)

Personal details
- Born: 20 October 1935
- Died: 25 September 2026 (aged 90)
- Other political affiliations: Pakistan Muslim League (N)

Chaudhary Muhammad Ashraf (Urdu: چوہدری محمد اشرف; 20 October 1935 – 25 September 2026) was a Pakistani politician who was a member of the National Assembly of Pakistan from August 2018 to August 2023. He had previously been a member of the National Assembly from June 2013 to May 2018.

== Political career ==
Ashraf ran for the seat of the National Assembly of Pakistan as a candidate of Pakistan Muslim League (Q) (PML-Q) from Constituency NA-161 (Sahiwal-II) in the 2002 Pakistani general election but was unsuccessful. He received 38,207 votes and lost the seat to Rana Tariq Javed, independent candidate.

He ran for the seat of the National Assembly as a candidate of Pakistan Democratic Party from Constituency NA-161 (Sahiwal-II) in the 2008 Pakistani general election but was unsuccessful. He received 33,110 votes and lost the seat to Ghulam Farid Kathia.

Ashraf was elected to the National Assembly as a candidate of Pakistan Muslim League (N) (PML-N) from Constituency NA-161 (Sahiwal-II) in the 2013 Pakistani general election. He received 94,012 votes and defeated Malik Muhammad Yar Dhakoo, a candidate of Pakistan Tehreek-e-Insaf (PTI).

He was re-elected to the National Assembly as a candidate of PML-N from Constituency NA-148 (Sahiwal-II) in the 2018 Pakistani general election.

== Personal life and death ==
Chaudhary Muhammad Ashraf was born on 20 October 1935. He died on 25 September 2026, aged 90.
