= NA-219 Hyderabad-II =

Constituency of the National Assembly of Pakistan

- Constituency for the National Assembly of Pakistan
- Region: Latifabad Tehsil (partly) and Hyderabad City area (partly) of Hyderabad District
- Electorate: 424,448

Current constituency
- Party: Muttahida Qaumi Movement – Pakistan
- Member: Abdul Aleem Khanzada
- Created from: NA-219 Hyderabad-II

NA-219 Hyderabad-II (این اے-219، حیدرآباد-۲) is a constituency for the National Assembly of Pakistan.

== Assembly Segments ==
Constituency number	Constituency	District	Current MPA	Party
62	PS-62 Hyderabad-III	Hyderabad District	Sabir Hussain Qaimkhani	MQM-P
63	PS-63 Hyderabad-IV	Hyderabad District	Rehan Rajpoot	IND (Note: Filed nomination papers as PTI candidate but ECP allowed him to run as an Independent)

== Members of Parliament ==
=== 2018–2023: NA-226 (Hyderabad-II) ===
Election	Member	Party
2018	Sabir Hussain Qaimkhani	MQM-P

=== 2024–present: NA-219 Hyderabad-II ===
Election	Member	Party
2024	Abdul Aleem Khanzada	MQM-P

== Election 2002 ==
General elections were held on 10 October 2002. Prof. Khalid Wahab of Muttahida Qaumi Movement won by 36,755 votes.

General election 2002: NA-219 Hyderabad-II
Party	Candidate	Votes	%	±%
MQM	Khalid Wahab	36,755	51.03	
MMA	Mushtaque Ahmed Khan	16,986	23.58	
PPP	Ch. Bashir Ahmed	8,762	12.16	
PST	Zaheer Ahmed	2,818	3.91	
PML(Q)	Mohammad Iqbal Shaikh	2,385	3.31	
Others	Others (eight candidates)	4,326	6.01	
Turnout		72,538	30.71	
Total valid votes		72,032	99.30	
Rejected ballots		506	0.70	
Majority		19,769	27.45	
Registered electors		236,225		

== Election 2008 ==
General elections were held on 18 February 2008. Syed Tayyab Hussain of Muttahida Qaumi Movement won by 168,136 votes.

General election 2008: NA-219 Hyderabad-II
Party	Candidate	Votes	%	±%
MQM	Syed Tayyab Hussain	168,136	85.84	
PPP	Ali Muhammad Sehto	25,343	12.94	
Others	Others (six candidates)	2,404	1.22	
Turnout		197,778	56.17	
Total valid votes		195,883	99.07	
Rejected ballots		1,895	0.93	
Majority		142,793	72.90	
Registered electors		352,079		
MQM hold				

== Election 2013 ==
General elections were held on 11 May 2013. Khalid Maqbool Siddiqui of Muttahida Qaumi Movement – London won by 141,035 votes and became the member of National Assembly.

General election 2013: NA-219 Hyderabad-II
Party	Candidate	Votes	%	±%
MQM	Khalid Maqbool Siddiqui	141,035	80.24	
PPP	Ali Muhammad Sehto	14,701	8.36	
JI	Shoukat Ali Shaikh	13,498	7.68	
Others	Others (twelve candidates)	6,522	3.72	
Turnout		177,755	58.82	
Total valid votes		175,756	98.88	
Rejected ballots		1,999	1.12	
Majority		126,334	71.88	
Registered electors		302,211		
MQM hold				

== Election 2018 ==
General elections were held on 25 July 2018.

General election 2018: NA-226 Hyderabad-II
Party	Candidate	Votes	%	±%
MQM-P	Sabir Hussain Qaimkhani	46,646	32.01	
PTI	Jamshaid Ali Shaikh	38,672	26.54	
PPP	Ali Muhammad Sahto	28,671	19.68	
TLP	Muhammad Tahir	10,222	7.02	
PSP	Rashid Ali Khan	8,566	5.88	
MMA	Tahir Majeed	4,614	3.17	
PML(N)	Saulat Naseer Pasha	3,650	2.50	
AAT	Faisal Nadeem Shaikh	2,117	1.45	
Others	Others (six candidates)	2,551	1.75	
Turnout		148,083	39.59	
Total valid votes		145,709	98.40	
Rejected ballots		2,374	1.60	
Majority		7,974	5.47	
Registered electors		374,082		
MQM-P hold		Swing	N/A	

^{†}MQM-P is considered heir apparent to MQM

== Election 2024 ==
Elections were held on 8 February 2024. Abdul Aleem Khanzada won the election with 55,050 votes.

General election 2024: NA-219 Hyderabad-II
Party	Candidate	Votes	%	±%
MQM-P	Abdul Aleem Khanzada	55,050	37.93	▲5.92
PTI	Mustansir Billah	38,316	26.40	▼0.14
PPP	Ali Muhammad Sahito	26,649	18.36	▼1.32
Others	Others (thirty five candidates)	25,137	17.32	
Turnout		148,159	34.91	▼4.68
Total valid votes		145,152	97.97	
Rejected ballots		3,007	2.03	
Majority		16,734	11.53	▲6.06
Registered electors		424,449		
MQM-P hold				

== See also ==
- NA-218 Hyderabad-I
- NA-220 Hyderabad-III
