= NA-249 Karachi Central-III =

Constituency of the National Assembly of Pakistan

- Constituency for the National Assembly of Pakistan
- Region: Nazimabad Town (partly) and Liaquatabad Town (partly) of Karachi Central District in Karachi
- Electorate: 548,806

Current constituency
- Party: MQM-P
- Member: Ahmed Salim Siddiqui
- Created from: NA-247 Karachi-IX

NA-249 Karachi Central-III (این اے-249, کراچی وسطی-3) is a constituency for the National Assembly of Pakistan.

== Area ==
This constituency includes neighborhoods of Liaquatabad, named after first Prime Minister of Pakistan Liaquat Ali Khan, and Nazimabad, named after second Prime Minister of Pakistan Khawaja Nazimuddin.

According to statistics, the total population of the area covered in NA-255 is 755,412, and of them, 460,110 are registered voters; 255,753 of total voters in the constituency are male while the constituency has 204,357 female voters.

== Assembly Segments ==
Constituency number	Constituency	District	Current MPA	Party
127	PS-127 Karachi Central-VI	Karachi Central	Muhammad Maaz Mehboob	MQM-P
128	PS-128 Karachi Central-VII	Karachi Central	Taha Ahmed Khan	MQM-P

== Members of Parliament ==
=== 2018–2023: NA-255 Karachi Central-III ===
Election	Member	Party
2018	Khalid Maqbool Siddiqui	MQM-P

=== 2024–present: NA-249 Karachi Central-III ===
Election	Member	Party
2024	Ahmed Salim Siddiqui	MQM-P

== Election 2002 ==
General elections were held on 10 October 2002. Israr-Ul-Ebad Khan of Muttahida Qaumi Movement won by 51,564 votes.

General election 2002: NA-247 (Karachi Central-IX)
Party	Candidate	Votes	%	±%
MQM	Israr-Ul-Ebad Khan	51,564	59.20	
MMA	Muhammad Taqi	26,526	30.46	
PPP	Syed Masood Hussain	3,581	4.11	
PST	Mohammad Farhat Hussain Saddqui	3,559	4.09	
Others	Others (six candidates)	1,869	2.14	
Turnout		88,302	36.34	
Total valid votes		87,099	98.64	
Rejected ballots		1,203	1.36	
Majority		25,038	28.74	
Registered electors		243,006		
MQM hold				

== Election 2008 ==
General elections were held on 18 February 2008. Dr. Nadeem Ehsan of Muttahida Qaumi Movement won his seat and became member of National Assembly.

General election 2008: NA-247 (Karachi Central-IX)
Party	Candidate	Votes	%	±%
MQM	Dr. Nadeem Ehsan	168,007	91.95	
PPP	Saathi Ishaque	13,963	7.64	
Others	Others (three candidates)	744	0.41	
Turnout		184,035	60.65	
Total valid votes		182,714	99.28	
Rejected ballots		1,321	0.72	
Majority		154,044	84.31	
Registered electors		303,455		
MQM hold				

== Election 2013 ==
General elections were held on 11 May 2013. Sufyan Yousuf of Muttahida Qaumi Movement won by 126,263 votes and became the member of National Assembly.

General election 2013: NA-247 (Karachi Central-IX)
Party	Candidate	Votes	%	±%
MQM	Sufiyan Yousuf	126,263	74.66	
PTI	Rashid Siddiqui	35,349	20.90	
Others	Others (ten candidates)	7,500	4.44	
Turnout		174,049	57.30	
Total valid votes		169,112	97.16	
Rejected ballots		4,937	2.84	
Majority		90,914	53.76	
Registered electors		303,774		
MQM hold				

== Election 2018 ==
General elections were held on 25 July 2018.

General election 2018: NA-255 (Karachi Central-III)
Party	Candidate	Votes	%	±%
MQM-P	Khalid Maqbool Siddiqui	59,807	34.72	
PTI	Mahmood Moulvi	50,352	29.23	
TLP	Muhammad Adeel	21,289	12.36	
MMA	Muhammad Mustaqeem Qureshi	11,323	6.57	
PPP	Zafar Ahmed Siddiqui	8,106	4.71	
PSP	Attaul Mustafa Jameel Rathore	8,099	4.70	
PML(N)	Nasiruddin Mehmood	7,608	4.42	
Others	Others (eight candidates)	5,669	3.29	
Turnout		174,406	37.91	
Total valid votes		172,253	98.77	
Rejected ballots		2,153	1.23	
Majority		9,455	5.49	
Registered electors		460,110		
MQM-P^{†} hold		Swing	N/A	

^{†}MQM-P is considered heir apparent to MQM

== Election 2024 ==
General elections were held on 8 February 2024. Ahmed Salim Siddiqui won the election with 77,529 votes.

General election 2024: NA-249 Karachi Central-III
Party	Candidate	Votes	%	±%
MQM-P	Ahmed Salim Siddiqui	77,529	38.68	▲3.96
PTI	Uzair Ali Khan (Note: Filed nomination papers as PTI candidate but ECP allowed him to run as an Independent)	51,152	25.52	▼3.71
JI	Mian Muslim Pervaiz	27,205	13.57	N/A
Independent	Muhammad Zahid Qureshi	15,764	7.86	N/A
TLP	Hafiz Muhammad Hamid Mehmood Kagani	9,494	4.74	▼7.62
PPP	Abdul Waheed	7,502	3.74	▼0.97
Others	Others (twenty one candidates)	11,787	5.88	
Turnout		203,169	36.63	▼1.28
Total valid votes		200,433	98.65	
Rejected ballots		2,736	1.35	
Majority		26,377	13.16	
Registered electors		554,641		
MQM-P hold				

== See also ==
- NA-248 Karachi Central-II
- NA-250 Karachi Central-IV
