= Rais Muhammad Mehboob Ahmed =

Pakistani politician

Member of the Provincial Assembly of the Punjab
- In office August 2013 – 31 May 2018

Personal details
- Born: 12 October 1964 (age 62) Multan, Punjab, Pakistan
- Party: PTI (2018-present)
- Other political affiliations: PMLN (2013-2018)

Rais Muhammad Mehboob Ahmed is a Pakistani politician who was a Member of the Provincial Assembly of the Punjab, from August 2013 to May 2018. He belongs to famous Rais family of Bhung in sadiqabad tehsil.

== Early life ==
He was born on 12 October 1964 in Multan.

== Political career ==
He was elected to the Provincial Assembly of the Punjab as a candidate of Pakistan Muslim League (Nawaz) from Constituency PP-289 (Rahimyar Khan-V) in by-polls held in August 2013.

He served as Chairman, Zila Council for two terms during 1991-93 and 1997–99

He also served as Chairman NCSW with the status of Federal Minister from 2008-2013

He ran for the seat of the National Assembly of Pakistan as a candidate of the Pakistan Tehreek-e-Insaf (PTI) from NA-178 Rahim Yar Khan-IV in the 2018 Pakistani general election, but was unsuccessful. He received 49,646 votes.
