= Makhdoom Ahmed Mehmood =

Pakistani politician (born 1955)

36th Governor of Punjab
- In office 3 January 2013 – 13 May 2013
- President: Asif Ali Zardari
- Prime Minister: Raja Parvez Ashraf
- Preceded by: Latif Khosa
- Succeeded by: Mohammad Sarwar

Member of the National Assembly of Pakistan
- In office 1990–1993, 1993–1996, 1997 – 1999 (NA-195)

Member of the Provincial Assembly of the Punjab
- In office 1988–1990, 2008 – 2012

Punjab Excise & Taxation Minister
- In office 1988–1990

District chairman Rahim Yar Khan
- In office 2001–2005

President of PML-F Punjab Chapter
- In office 2008 – 20 December 2012

President of Pakistan Peoples Party South Punjab
- In office November 2016 – Present

Personal details
- Born: Syed Ahmed Mehmood; 12 September 1955 (age 70) Karachi, Sindh, Pakistan
- Party: Pakistan People's Party (2012-present)
- Other political affiliations: Pakistan Muslim League (F) (2005-2012); Pakistan Muslim League (Q) (2001-2005); Pakistan Muslim League (N) (1993-2001); Islami Jamhoori Ittehad (1988-1993)
- Relations: Syed Sibghatullah Shah Rashdi III (cousin); Yusuf Raza Gilani (cousin); Jahangir Khan Tareen (brother-in-law); Makhdoom Syed Murtaza Mehmood (son); Mustafa Mehmood (son)
- Children: 4 Murtaza Mustafa Ali Sakina(divorced)
- Profession: Farming, business, Landlord

Makhdoom Ahmed Mehmood (Urdu: مخدوم احمد محمود; born 12 September 1955) is a Pakistani businessman and politician who is the chairman of JDW Group. Belonging from Jamal Din Wali Tehsil Sadiqabad of District Rahim Yar Khan, in Punjab, he was elected to the National Assemblies on IJI ticket in 1990–1993, PMLN's ticket from 1993 to 1996 and 1996 to 1999. He was also elected to Punjab Assembly on PML-N ticket from 1988 to 1990, and on PML-F ticket from 2008 to 2012. He remained District Nazim Rahim Yar Khan from 2001 to 2005. At the end of 2012, he left PML-F and joined PPP on desire of then President Asif Ali Zardari who had declared him Governor of Punjab.

Before joining the Peoples Party, he was part of the Muslim League-F, but joined the Peoples Party after settling for the governorship. He left PML-F and became Governor Punjab. Presently, he is the president of PPP South Punjab chapter.

== Political career ==
On 3 January 2013, he took oath as 29th Governor of Punjab. He resigned from the post of the governor on 13 May 2013 after PML-N swept the 2013 Pakistani general election.

Political offices
Preceded by Latif Khosa	Governor of Punjab; 25 December 2012 – 13 May 2013	Succeeded by Mohammad Sarwar
