= Sabheen Ghoury =

Pakistani politician

Sabheen Ghoury is a Pakistani politician who has been a Member of the National Assembly of Pakistan since 2024. She is also Parliamentary Secretary for Ministry of Information Technology and Telecommunication since November 2024. She is from MQM Pakistan and also serve as Incharge Digital Media Wing. She started her political career from student Organisation APMSO and served as Chairperson of Information & Media in Karachi Metropolitan Cooperation ( KMC ). As a Business woman she served in Education sector from last 20 years .

She is also working as Human Rights activist & Women Rights activist since last 16 years and being the integral part of Standing Committee of Human Rights in National Assembly of Pakistan. She is also aatached to Working group of Parliamentary Caucus on Minority Rights .

As an Engineer she is the Vice Chairperson of The Engineers Pakistan(TEP). Life Time Member of Institute of Engineering & professionals (IEP)

== Political career ==
In the 2024 Pakistani general election, she secured a seat in the National Assembly of Pakistan through a reserved quota for women as a candidate of Muttahida Qaumi Movement – Pakistan (MQM). She is also Parliamentary secretary for Ministry of Information Technology and Telecommunications. She serves as an Incharge Digital Media Wing MQM - Pakistan.
