= NA-169 Rahim Yar Khan-I =

Constituency of the National Assembly of Pakistan

- Constituency for the National Assembly of Pakistan
- Region: Liaquatpur Tehsil (partly) including Liaquatpur city of Rahim Yar Khan District
- Electorate: 527,946

Current constituency
- Party: Pakistan People's Party
- Member: Makhdoom Syed Murtaza Mehmood
- Created from: NA-192 Rahim Yar Khan-I

NA-169 Rahim Yar Khan-I (این اے-169، رحیم یار خان-۱) is a constituency for the National Assembly of Pakistan.

== Election 2002 ==
General elections were held on 10 October 2002. Makhdoom Syed Ahmad Alam Anwar an independent candidate won by 74,933 votes.

General election 2002: NA-192 Rahim Yar Khan-I
Party	Candidate	Votes	%	±%
Independent	Makhdoom Syed Ahmad Alam Anwar	74,933	55.83	
PPP	Muhammad Saifullah Khan	34,111	25.42	
MMA	Mian Zubair Ahmad Deen Puri	25,168	18.75	
Turnout		137,640	39.79	
Total valid votes		134,212	97.51	
Rejected ballots		3,428	2.49	
Majority		40,822	30.41	
Registered electors		345,937		

== Election 2008 ==
General elections were held on 18 February 2008. Hamid Saeed Kazmi of PPP won by 65,395 votes.

General election 2008: NA-192 Rahim Yar Khan-I
Party	Candidate	Votes	%	±%
PPP	Syed Hamid Saeed Kazmi	65,395	42.06	
PML(Q)	Makhdoom Syed Ahmad Alam Anwar	45,579	29.31	
PML(F)	Makhdum Syed Ahmad Mahmud	40,131	25.81	
Others	Others (four candidates)	4,384	2.82	
Turnout		159,838	39.89	
Total valid votes		155,489	97.28	
Rejected ballots		4,349	2.72	
Majority		19,816	12.75	
Registered electors		400,697		
PPP gain from Independent				

== Election 2013 ==
General elections were held on 11 May 2013. Khwaja Ghulam Rasool Koreja of

PPP won by 80,499 votes and became the member of National Assembly.

General election 2013: NA-192 Rahim Yar Khan-I
Party	Candidate	Votes	%	±%
PPP	Khwaja Ghulam Rasool Koreja	80,823	42.22	
PML(N)	Makhdoom Syed Ahmad Alam Anwar	79,562	41.56	
PTI	Muhammad Asif	16,452	8.60	
Others	Others (nine candidates)	14,587	7.62	
Turnout		198,178	58.40	
Total valid votes		191,424	96.59	
Rejected ballots		6,754	3.41	
Majority		1,261	0.66	
Registered electors		339,364		
PPP hold				

== Election 2018 ==
General elections were held on 25 July 2018.

General election 2018: NA-175 Rahim Yar Khan-I
Party	Candidate	Votes	%	±%
PTI	Syed Mobeen Ahmed	97,347	41.03	
PPP	Khwaja Ghulam Rasool Koreja	89,292	37.64	
Independent	Hamid Saeed Kazmi	39,514	16.65	
Independent	Khawaja Muhammad Asghar Koreja	4,510	1.90	
Independent	Muhammad Ilyas	2,097	0.88	
TLP	Nazia Perveen	1,687	0.71	
MMA	Ghulam Mustafa Sabar	1,592	0.67	
Independent	Muhammad Zubair	774	0.33	
Independent	Mian Fiaz Ul Hassan	444	0.19	
Turnout		243,467	56.66	
Total valid votes		237,257	97.45	
Rejected ballots		6,210	2.55	
Majority		8,055	3.40	
Registered electors		429,706		
PTI gain from PPP				

== Election 2024 ==
General elections were held on 8 February 2024. Makhdoom Syed Murtaza Mehmood won the election with 81,187 votes.

General election 2024: NA-169 Rahim Yar Khan-I
Party	Candidate	Votes	%	±%
PPP	Makhdoom Syed Murtaza Mehmood	81,187	31.81	▼5.83
PML(N)	Syed Mobeen Ahmed	73,533	28.81	
PTI	Raja Muhammad Saleem (Note: Filed nomination papers as PTI candidate but ECP allowed him to run as an independent)	70,823	27.75	▼13.28
Others	Others (twelve candidates)	29,711	11.64	
Turnout		265,086	50.21	▼6.45
Total valid votes		255,254	96.29	
Rejected ballots		9,832	3.71	
Majority		7,654	3.00	
Registered electors		527,946		
PPP gain from PTI				

== See also ==
- NA-168 Bahawalpur-V
- NA-170 Rahim Yar Khan-II
