= Ahmed Salim Siddiqui =

Member of the National Assembly of Pakistan from Karachi (2024–2029)

- احمد سلیم صدیقی

Member of the National Assembly of Pakistan
- Incumbent
- Assumed office 29 February 2024
- Constituency: NA-249 Karachi Central-III

Personal details
- Born: Karachi, Sindh, Pakistan
- Party: MQM-P (2024-present)

Ahmed Salim Siddiqui (Urdu: احمد سلیم صدیقی) is a Pakistani politician who has been a member of the National Assembly of Pakistan since February 2024.

== Political career ==
Siddiqui won the 2024 Pakistani general election from NA-249 Karachi Central-III as a Muttahida Qaumi Movement – Pakistan candidate. He received 77,529 votes while runners up Independent supported Pakistan Tehreek-e-Insaf (PTI) candidate Uzair Ali Khan received 51,152 votes.
