= Aziz Aslam Shaikh =

Pakistani politician

Aziz Aslam Shaikh (born 15 October 1956 in Rahim Yar Khan, Pakistan) is a member of the Assembly of the Punjab (district PP-297). He was first elected in 2002 and is a member of the Pakistan People's Party Parliamentarians. He is an agriculturist and businessman with an M.B.A. degree from Dallas Baptist University.
