= NA-125 Lahore-IX =

Constituency of the National Assembly of Pakistan

- Constituency for the National Assembly of Pakistan
- Region: Lahore City area (partly) and Raiwand town of Lahore District
- Electorate: 340,655

Current constituency
- Created: 2018
- Party: Pakistan Muslim League (N)
- Member: Afzal Khokhar
- Created from: NA-128 (Lahore-XI)

NA-125 Lahore-IX (این اے-125، لاہور-9) is a newly created constituency for the National Assembly of Pakistan. It mainly comprises the Raiwind Tehsil.

== Members of Parliament ==
=== 2018–2023: NA-136 Lahore-XIV ===
Election	Member	Party
2018	Afzal Khokhar	PML (N)

=== 2024–present: NA-125 Lahore-IX ===
Election	Member	Party
2024	Afzal Khokhar	PML (N)

== Election 2018 ==
General elections were held on 25 July 2018.

General election 2018: NA-136 Lahore-XIV
Party	Candidate	Votes	%	±%
PML(N)	Afzal Khokhar	88,831	54.55	
PTI	Malik Asad Ali Khokhar	44,669	27.43	
Others	Others (thirteen candidates)	29,341	18.02	
Turnout		167,538	56.08	
Total valid votes		162,841	97.20	
Rejected ballots		4,697	2.80	
Majority		44,162	27.12	
Registered electors		298,747		
PML(N) hold		Swing	N/A	

== Election 2024 ==
General elections were held on 8 February 2024. Afzal Khokhar won the election with 65,102 votes.

General election 2024: NA-125 Lahore-IX
Party	Candidate	Votes	%	±%
PML(N)	Afzal Khokhar	65,102	40.68	▼13.87
PTI	Javaid Umar (Note: Filed nomination papers as PTI candidate but ECP allowed him to run as an Independent)	51,144	31.96	▲4.53
TLP	Khurram Shahzad	25,490	15.93	▲8.15
Others	Others (thirteen candidates)	18,285	11.43	
Turnout		163,916	48.12	▼7.96
Total valid votes		160,021	97.62	
Rejected ballots		3,895	2.38	
Majority		13,958	8.72	▼18.40
Registered electors		340,655		
PML(N) hold		Swing	N/A	

== See also ==
- NA-124 Lahore-VIII
- NA-126 Lahore-X
