= Shaista Khan (Pakistani politician) =

Pakistani politician

Shaista Khan is a Pakistani politician who has been a Member of the National Assembly of Pakistan since 2024.

== Political career ==
She ran for the seat of the Provincial Assembly of Khyber Pakhtunkhwa as a candidate of Pakistan Muslim League (N) (PML-N) from Constituency PK-46 Haripur-I in the 2024 Pakistani general election, but she was unsuccessful. She received 6,422 votes and lost the seat to Akbar Ayub Khan who received 68,835 votes.

Following the election, she secured a seat in the National Assembly of Pakistan through a reserved quota for women as a candidate of Pakistan Muslim League (N) (PML(N)).
