= Khalid Maqbool Siddiqui =

Pakistani politician

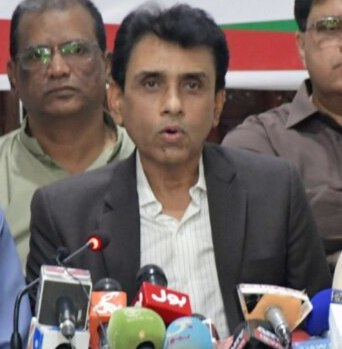

Party leader of the MQM-P
- Incumbent
- Assumed office 13 February 2018
- Preceded by: Farooq Sattar; Altaf Hussain

Federal Minister of Education and Professional Training
- Incumbent
- Assumed office 11 March 2024
- President: Asif Ali Zardari
- Prime Minister: Shehbaz Sharif
- Preceded by: Madad Ali Sindhi

Federal Minister of Science and Technology
- In office 11 March 2024 – 24 April 2025
- President: Asif Ali Zardari
- Prime Minister: Shehbaz Sharif
- Preceded by: Umar Saif
- Succeeded by: Khalid Hussain Magsi

Federal Minister of Information Technology and Telecommunication
- In office 20 August 2018 – 6 April 2020
- President: Mamnoon Hussain; Arif Alvi
- Prime Minister: Imran Khan
- Preceded by: Muhammad Yusuf Shaikh (caretaker)
- Succeeded by: Syed Aminul Haque

Federal Minister of Industries and Production
- In office July 1997 – August 1998
- Prime Minister: Nawaz Sharif

Member of the National Assembly of Pakistan
- Incumbent
- Assumed office 29 February 2024
- Constituency: NA-248 Karachi Central-II
- In office 13 August 2018 – 10 August 2023
- Constituency: NA-249 (Karachi Central-III)
- In office 1 June 2013 – 31 May 2018
- Constituency: NA-219 (Hyderabad-I)
- In office 1997–1999
- Constituency: NA-219 (Hyderabad-I)
- In office 1990–1993
- Constituency: NA-219 (Hyderabad-I)

Personal details
- Born: Hyderabad, Sindh, Pakistan
- Party: MQM-P (2018-present)
- Other political affiliations: MQM-L (1990-2018)

Khalid Maqbool Siddiqui (Urdu: خالد مقبول صدیقی) is a Pakistani politician who is currently serving as Federal Minister of Education and Professional Training since 2024. He has been a member of the National Assembly of Pakistan since February 2024 and previously served in this position from August 2018 till August 2023 and the leader of the MQM, since February 2018.

Previously, he was a member of the National Assembly from 1990 to 1993, from 1997 to 1999 and again from June 2013 to May 2018. During his second tenure as member of the National Assembly, he served Federal Minister for Industries and Production from July 1997 to August 1998 in the cabinet of Prime Minister Nawaz Sharif.

== Political career ==
As a student, he became chairman of All Pakistan Muttahidda Students Organization (APMSO) in 1989 while studying in Jinnah Sindh Medical University.

He was elected to the National Assembly of Pakistan as a candidate of Haq Parast Group (HPG) from NA-169 (Hyderabad-III) in the 1990 general election. He received 91,373 votes and defeated Mirza Ashiq Hussain Baig, a candidate of the Pakistan Democratic Alliance. The Muttahida Qaumi Movement (MQM) had fielded candidates for the 1990 general election under the banner of the HPG. In 1993, he was appointed as deputy convener of MQM.

He was re-elected to the National Assembly as a candidate of HPG from Constituency NA-169 (Hyderabad-III) in the 1997 Pakistani general election. He received 54,044 votes and defeated Rashid Naghar, a candidate of the Pakistan Muslim League (N) (PML(N)). In July 1997, he was inducted into the federal cabinet of Prime Minister Nawaz Sharif and was appointed as Federal Minister for Industries and Production where he continued to serve until August 1998.

He was re-elected to the National Assembly as a candidate of MQM from Constituency NA-219 (Hyderabad-I) in the 2013 Pakistani general election. He received 141,035 votes and defeated Ali Muhammad Sehto, a candidate of Pakistan Peoples Party (PPP).

On 11 February 2018, he was elevated from deputy Convener of MQM to Convener of MQM after the Coordination Committee of MQM appointed him as the new Convener of the party, replacing Farooq Sattar. In retaliation, Farooq Sattar dissolved the party's Coordination Committee and called for fresh intra-party election. On 18 February, Farooq Sattar was elected as Convener of the party in intra-party election. Faction of MQM led by Siddique challenged the polls and filed a petition in the Election Commission of Pakistan (ECP) and stated that since Farooq Sattar was removed as convener on 11 February, he had no authority to hold the intra-party elections. On 26 March 2018, the ECP ruled in favour of Siddiqui and removed Farooq Sattar as Convener of MQM.

On 28 March 2018, Farooq Sattar filed a petition in the Islamabad High Court to against the decision of the ECP to suspend him as the convener of the MQM. On 11 June, the Islamabad High Court dismissed the petition and upheld the orders of the ECP.

He was re-elected to the National Assembly as a candidate of MQM from Constituency NA-255 (Karachi Central-III) in the 2018 Pakistani general election. He received 59,781 votes and defeated Mahmood Moulvi, a candidate of the Pakistan Tehreek-e-Insaf (PTI).

On 18 August, Imran Khan formally announced his federal cabinet structure and Siddiqui was named as Minister for Information Technology and Telecommunication. On 20 August 2018, he was sworn in as Federal Minister for Information Technology and Telecommunication in the federal cabinet of Prime Minister Imran Khan.

On 20 August 2018, a court declared Siddiqui proclaimed absconder in a case regarding violation of the Loudspeaker Act.

On 6 April in a cabinet reshuffle, his resignation was accepted by PM Imran Khan.

On March 30, 2022, Khalid Maqbool Siddiqui's MQM-P left the coalition government of Prime Minister Imran Khan.
