= Syed Hussain Tariq =

Pakistani politician

- سيد حسين طارق ڄاموٽ

Member of the National Assembly of Pakistan
- Incumbent
- Assumed office 29 February 2024
- Constituency: NA-218 Hyderabad-I
- In office 13 August 2018 – 10 August 2023
- Constituency: NA-225 (Hyderabad-I)

Personal details
- Party: PPP (2018-present)
- Parent: Syed Amir Ali Shah Jamote (father)

Syed Hussain Tariq Jamote (Sindhi: سيد حسين طارق ڄاموٽ) is a Pakistani politician who has been a member of the National Assembly of Pakistan since February 2024 and previously served in this position from August 2018 till August 2023.

== Political career ==
He was elected to the National Assembly of Pakistan from NA-225 (Hyderabad-I) as a candidate of Pakistan Peoples Party (PPP) in the 2018 Pakistani general election. He received 81,983 votes and defeated Khawand Bakhsh Ghulam Muhammad, a candidate of Pakistan Tehreek-e-Insaf (PTI)

He was re-elected to the National Assembly as a candidate of PPP from NA-218 Hyderabad-I in the 2024 Pakistani general election. He received 108,598 votes and defeated Muhammad Rizwan, a candidate of the Grand Democratic Alliance (GDA).
