= Saba Sadiq =

Pakistani politician

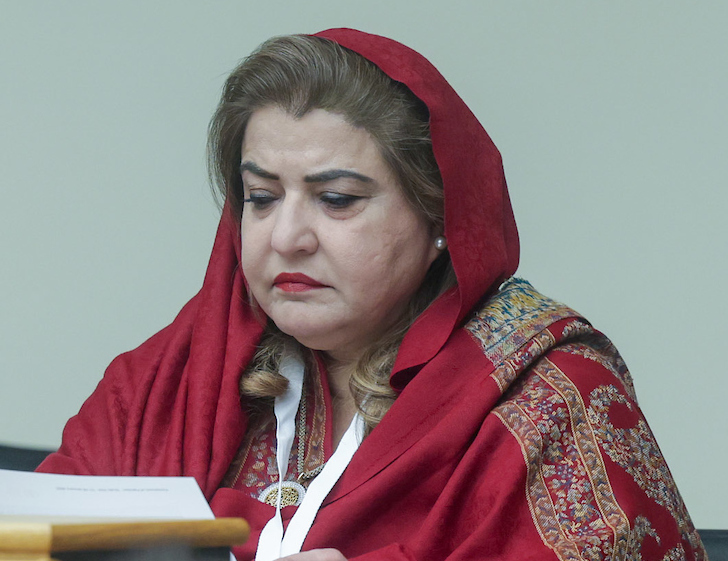
- Saba Sadiq in 2024

Member of the Provincial Assembly of the Punjab
- In office 2002 – -
- Constituency: Reserved seat for women

Personal details
- Born: 7 January 1966 (age 60) Lahore, Punjab, Pakistan
- Party: PMLN (2008-present)

Saba Sadiq (Urdu: صبا صادق; born 7 January 1966) is a Pakistani politician who is a Member of the Provincial Assembly of the Punjab, from 2002 to 2023, and former minister. Currently serving as an member of National Assembly Of Pakistan

== Early life and education ==
She was born on 7 January 1966 in Lahore.

She earned the degree of Bachelor of Laws in 1991 and received the degree of Master of Arts in Political Science in 2001, both from University of the Punjab.

She also holds the degree of Bachelor of Arts.

== Political career ==
She was elected to the Provincial Assembly of the Punjab as a candidate of Pakistan Muslim League (Q) (PML-Q) on a reserved seat for women in the 2002 Pakistani general election.

She was re-elected to the Provincial Assembly of the Punjab as a candidate of PML-Q on a reserved seat for women in the 2008 Pakistani general election. She joined Pakistan Muslim League (N) (PML-N) shortly afterwards.

She was re-elected to the Provincial Assembly of the Punjab as a candidate of PML-N on a reserved seat for women in the 2013 Pakistani general election.

She was re-elected to the Provincial Assembly of the Punjab as a candidate of PML-N on a reserved seat for women in the 2018 Pakistani general election.
