= Malik Karamat Khokhar =

Pakistani politician

Member of the National Assembly of Pakistan
- In office 13 August 2018 – 20 January 2023
- Constituency: NA-135 (Lahore-XIII)

Personal details
- Born: Lahore, Punjab, Pakistan
- Party: PTI (2018-present)
- Other political affiliations: PPP (1993-1996)

Malik Karamat Khokhar (ملک کرامت کھوکھر) is a Pakistani politician who was a member of the National Assembly of Pakistan from August 2018 until January 2023. Previously he was a member of the Provincial Assembly of the Punjab from 1993 to 1996.

== Political career ==
He was elected to the Provincial Assembly of the Punjab as a candidate of Pakistan Peoples Party (PPP) from Constituency PP-131 (Lahore-XVI) in the 1993 Pakistani general election.

He was elected to the National Assembly of Pakistan as a candidate of Pakistan Tehreek-e-Insaf (PTI) from Constituency NA-135 (Lahore-XIII) in the 2018 Pakistani general election.

== More Reading ==
- List of members of the 15th National Assembly of Pakistan
