= Syed Usman Mehmood =

Pakistani politician

Member of the Provincial Assembly of the Punjab
- In office 15 August 2018 – 14 January 2023
- Constituency: PP-264 Rahim Yar Khan-X

Personal details
- Party: IND (2025-present)
- Other political affiliations: PPP (2018-2025)
- Relations: Makhdoom Syed Ali Akbar Mehmood (father)

Syed Usman Mehmood is a Pakistani politician who had been a member of the Provincial Assembly of the Punjab from August 2018 till January 2023.

== Political career ==
He was elected to the Provincial Assembly of the Punjab as a candidate of Pakistan Peoples Party from Constituency PP-264 (Rahim Yar Khan-X) in the 2018 Pakistani general election.
