= PP-166 Lahore-XXII =

Constituency of the Provincial Assembly of Punjab, Pakistan

- Constituency for the Provincial Assembly of Punjab
- Region: Raiwand Town (partly) of Lahore City in Lahore District

Current constituency
- Created from: PP-161 Lahore-XXV (2002-2018); PP-165 Lahore-XXII (2018-2023)

PP-166 Lahore-XXII (پی پی-166، لاہور-22) is a Constituency of Provincial Assembly of Punjab.

== General elections 2024 ==
Provincial election 2024: PP-166 Lahore-XXII
Party	Candidate	Votes	%	±%
PML(N)	Muhammad Anas Mehmood	32,270	36.73	
Independent	Khalid Mehmood (Note: Filed nomination papers as PTI candidate but ECP allowed him to run as an Independent)	30,611	34.84	
TLP	Muhammad Nawaz	13,413	15.27	
PPP	Jamil Ahmad	5,165	5.88	
Independent	Rana Sarmad Faryad	2,016	2.29	
Others	Others (thirty two candidates)	4,388	4.99	
Turnout		90,762	47.16	
Total valid votes		87,863	96.80	
Rejected ballots		2,899	3.20	
Majority		1,659	1.89	
Registered electors		192,438		
hold				

== General elections 2018 ==
Provincial election 2018: PP-165 Lahore-XXII
Party	Candidate	Votes	%	±%
PML(N)	Mian Muhammad Shehbaz Sharif	43,322	53.72	
PTI	Muhammad Yousaf	22,961	28.47	
PPP	Abdul Samad Khan	7,657	9.50	
TLP	Amjad Naeem	3,248	4.03	
Independent	Muhammad Saleem	1,194	1.48	
PRHP	Hafiz Muhammad Hamza	928	1.15	
Others	Others (eleven candidates)	1,336	1.65	
Turnout		82,497	62.85	
Total valid votes		80,646	97.76	
Rejected ballots		1,851	2.24	
Majority		20,361	25.25	
Registered electors		131,265		

== General elections 2013 ==
Provincial election 2013: PP-161 Lahore-XXV
Party	Candidate	Votes	%	±%
PML(N)	Mian Muhammad Shehbaz Sharif	60,311	60.66	
PTI	Chaudhary Khalid Mahmood Gujjar	18,181	18.29	
Independent	Abdul Rasheed Bhatti	14,569	14.65	
PPP	Shaukat Ali Dogar	1,826	1.84	
Independent	Tariq Saeed	1,184	1.19	
MWM	Rai Nasir Ali	1,068	1.07	
Others	Others (sixteen candidates)	2,291	2.30	
Turnout		100,684	55.29	
Total valid votes		99,430	98.75	
Rejected ballots		1,254	1.25	
Majority		42,130	42.37	
Registered electors		182,088		

== General elections 2008 ==
Contesting candidates	Party affiliation	Votes polled

== See also ==
- PP-165 Lahore-XXI
- PP-167 Lahore-XXIII
