= NA-218 Hyderabad-I =

Constituency of the National Assembly of Pakistan

- Constituency for the National Assembly of Pakistan
- Region: Qasimabad Tehsil (partly) and Hyderabad Rural Tehsil of Hyderabad District
- Electorate: 339,677

Current constituency
- Party: Pakistan People's Party
- Member: Syed Hussain Tariq
- Created from: NA-221 Hyderabad-IV

NA-218 Hyderabad-I (این اے-218، حیدرآباد-1) is a constituency for the National Assembly of Pakistan.

== Assembly Segments ==
Constituency number	Constituency	District	Current MPA	Party
60	PS-60 Hyderabad-I	Hyderabad District	Jam Khan Shoro	PPP
61	PS-61 Hyderabad-II	Hyderabad District	Sharjeel Memon	PPP

== Members of Parliament ==
=== 2018–2023: NA-225 Hyderabad-I ===
Election	Member	Party
2018	Syed Hussain Tariq	PPPP

=== 2024–present: NA-218 Hyderabad-I ===
Election	Member	Party
2024	Syed Hussain Tariq	PPPP

== Election 2002 ==
General elections were held on 10 October 2002. Syed Amir Ali Shah Jamote of PPP won by 44,899 votes.

General election 2002: NA-221 Hyderabad-I
Party	Candidate	Votes	%	±%
PPP	Syed Amir Ali Shah Jamote	44,899	65.77	
PML(Q)	Syed Shahabuddin Shah	12,966	18.99	
MQM	Shabbir Hussain Bajkani	7,136	10.45	
Others	Others (eight candidates)	3,265	4.79	
Turnout		69,732	31.18	
Total valid votes		68,266	97.89	
Rejected ballots		1,466	2.11	
Majority		31,933	46.78	
Registered electors		223,681		

== Election 2008 ==
General elections were held on 18 February 2008. Syed Amir Ali Shah Jamote of PPP won by 102,737 votes.

General election 2008: NA-221 Hyderabad-I
Party	Candidate	Votes	%	±%
PPP	Syed Amir Ali Shah Jamote	102,737	85.93	
PML(Q)	Hussaini Shahabuddin Shah	10,609	8.87	
Others	Others (six candidates)	6,213	5.20	
Turnout		121,051	37.03	
Total valid votes		119,559	98.77	
Rejected ballots		1,492	1.23	
Majority		92,128	77.06	
Registered electors		326,862		
PPP hold				

== Election 2013 ==
General elections were held on 11 May 2013. Syed Amir Ali Shah Jamote of PPP won by 59,821 votes and became the member of National Assembly.

General election 2013: NA-221 Hyderabad-I
Party	Candidate	Votes	%	±%
PPP	Syed Amir Ali Shah Jamote	59,821	51.81	
STP	Rajab Ali	18,346	15.89	
PTI	Syed Ahmed Rasheed	14,544	12.60	
MQM	Ghazi Salahuddin	13,026	11.28	
Independent	Khawand Bux Ghulam Muhammad	4,298	3.72	
Others	Others (twenty candidates)	5,423	4.70	
Turnout		139,974	52.02	
Total valid votes		115,458	82.49	
Rejected ballots		24,516	17.51	
Majority		41,475	35.92	
Registered electors		269,066		
PPP hold				

== Election 2018 ==
General elections were held on 25 July 2018.

General election 2018: NA-225 Hyderabad-I
Party	Candidate	Votes	%	±%
PPP	Syed Hussain Tariq	81,983	58.38	
PTI	Khawand Bakhsh Ghulam Muhammad	50,968	36.30	
Others	Others (five candidates)	7,470	5.32	
Turnout		145,981	48.10	
Total valid votes		140,421	96.19	
Rejected ballots		5,560	3.81	
Majority		31,015	22.08	
Registered electors		303,478		
PPP hold		Swing	N/A	

== Election 2024 ==
Elections were held on 8 February 2024. Syed Hussain Tariq won the election with 108,598 votes.

General election 2024: NA-218 Hyderabad-I
Party	Candidate	Votes	%	±%
PPP	Syed Hussain Tariq	108,598	81.41	▲23.03
GDA	Muhammad Rizwan	7,942	5.95	▲2.50
JI	Zubair Khadim	5,139	3.85	
Others	Others (eight candidates)	11,721	8.79	
Turnout		138,445	40.84	▼7.26
Total valid votes		133,403	96.36	
Rejected ballots		5,042	3.64	
Majority		100,656	75.45	▲53.37
Registered electors		338,955		
PPP hold				

== See also ==
- NA-217 Tando Allahyar
- NA-219 Hyderabad-II
