= NA-128 (Lahore-XI) =

Former constituency of the National Assembly of Pakistan

- Former constituency for the National Assembly of Pakistan
- Region: Lahore District

Former constituency
- Created: 2002
- Abolished: 2018

NA-128 (Lahore-XI) (Urdu: این اے-۱۲۸، لاهور-۱۱) was a constituency for the National Assembly of Pakistan. After the 2018 delimitations, its areas were divided among NA-135 (Lahore-XIII) and NA-136 (Lahore-XIV).

== Boundaries ==
This is one of the largest national assembly constituency in Lahore starting from Kharak stop on Multan Road and going all the way to the boundary of Lahore district near Manga Mandi, and also stretches to the two of Raiwind. Major Areas are Thokar Niaz Beg, Johar Town, Mustafa Town, Wapda Town, NFC Society, Valencia, Bahria Town and many villages along Raiwind Road.

== Election 2002 ==
General elections were held on 10 Oct 2002. Malik Zaheer Abbas of PPP won by 31,175 votes.

General election 2002: NA-128 Lahore-XI
Party	Candidate	Votes	%	±%
PPP	Malik Zaheer Abbas	31,175	33.65	
PML(N)	Sardar Kamil Umar	29,682	32.04	
PML(Q)	Wazir Ali Bhatti	26,652	28.77	
PTI	Dr. Abdul Wahab	2,445	2.64	
Independent	Muhammad Yasir Ghufran	2,132	2.30	
Independent	Malik Jangir Hussain Bara	570	0.60	
Turnout		95,690	39.20	
Total valid votes		92,656	96.83	
Rejected ballots		3,034	3.17	
Majority		1,493	1.61	
Registered electors		244,140		

== Election 2008 ==
General elections were held on 18 Feb 2008. Malik Muhammad Afzal Khokhar of PML-N won by 65,727 votes.

General election 2008: NA-128 Lahore-XI
Party	Candidate	Votes	%	±%
PML(N)	Malik Muhammad Afzal Khokhar	65,727	53.60	
PPP	Malik Karamat Ali Khokhar	37,608	30.67	
PML(Q)	Sardar Aqil Omer	18,252	14.89	
Others	Others (five candidates)	1,030	0.84	
Turnout		125,374	45.55	
Total valid votes		122,617	97.80	
Rejected ballots		2,757	2.20	
Majority		28,119	22.93	
Registered electors		275,267		

== Election 2013 ==
General elections were held on 11 May 2013. Malik Muhammad Afzal Khokhar of PML-N won by 124,107 votes and became the member of National Assembly beating Malik Karamat Ali Khokhar of Pakistan Tehreek-e-Insaf (PTI).

General election 2013: NA-128 Lahore-XI
Party	Candidate	Votes	%	±%
PML(N)	Malik Muhammad Afzal Khokhar	124,107	56.38	
PTI	Malik Karamat Ali Khokhar	78,369	35.60	
JI	Zahoor Ahmad Watto	9,483	4.31	
PPP	Mian Muhammad Aslam Arain	3,408	1.55	
Others	Others (twenty three candidates)	4,747	2.16	
Turnout		223,288	53.37	
Total valid votes		220,114	98.58	
Rejected ballots		3,174	1.42	
Majority		45,738	20.78	
Registered electors		418,384		
