= NA-217 Tando Allahyar =

Constituency of the National Assembly of Pakistan

- Constituency for the National Assembly of Pakistan
- Region: Tando Allahyar District
- Electorate: 451,632

Current constituency
- Party: Pakistan People's Party
- Member(s): Zulfiqar Sattar Bachani
- Created from: NA-223 Hyderabad-VI

NA-217 Tando Allahyar (این اے-217، ٹنڈو اللہ یار) is a constituency for the National Assembly of Pakistan.

== Assembly Segments ==
Constituency number	Constituency	District	Current MPA	Party
58	PS-58 Tando Allahyar-I	Tando Allahyar District	Syed Zia Abbas Shah	PPP
59	PS-59 Tando Allahyar-II	Tando Allahyar District	Imdad Ali Pitafi	PPP

== Members of Parliament ==
=== 2018–2023: NA-224 Tando Allahyar ===
Election	Member	Party
2018	Zulfiqar Sattar Bachani	PPPP

=== 2024–present: NA-217 Tando Allahyar ===
Election	Member	Party
2024	Zulfiqar Sattar Bachani	PPPP

== Election 2002 ==
General elections were held on 10 October 2002. Abdul Sattar Bachani of PPP won by 50,624 votes.

General election 2002: NA-223 Hyderabad-VI
Party	Candidate	Votes	%	±%
PPP	Shamshad Sattar Bachani	50,624	51.74	
Independent	Adeeba Gul Magsi	28,610	29.24	
MQM	Samina Arif Rajput	7,515	7.68	
MMA	Dr. Nawaz Ali Nizamani	5,669	5.79	
Independent	Mohammad Amin Jarwar	2,429	2.48	
Others	Others (four candidates)	2,994	3.07	
Turnout		100,668	36.62	
Total valid votes		97,841	97.19	
Rejected ballots		2,827	2.81	
Majority		22,014	22.50	
Registered electors		274,892		

== Election 2008 ==
General elections were held on 18 February 2008. Abdul Sattar Bachani of PPP won by 84,669 votes.

General election 2008: NA-223 Hyderabad-VI
Party	Candidate	Votes	%	±%
PPP	Abdul Sattar Bachani	84,669	64.69	
PML(Q)	Adeeba Gul Magsi	44,502	34.00	
Others	Others (twelve candidates)	1,705	1.31	
Turnout		135,570	49.54	
Total valid votes		130,876	96.54	
Rejected ballots		4,694	3.06	
Majority		40,167	30.69	
Registered electors		273,675		
PPP hold				

== Election 2013 ==
General elections were held on 11 May 2013. Abdul Sattar Bachani of PPP won by 91,956 votes and became the member of National Assembly.

General election 2013: NA-223 Hyderabad-VI
Party	Candidate	Votes	%	±%
PPP	Abdul Sattar Bachani	91,956	49.56	
PML(N)	Dr. Rahila Gul Magsi	68,118	36.71	
MQM	Sajid Wahab Khanzada	8,700	4.69	
Others	Others (nineteen candidates)	16,773	9.04	
Turnout		193,496	64.29	
Total valid votes		185,547	95.89	
Rejected ballots		7,949	4.11	
Majority		23,838	12.85	
Registered electors		300,955		
PPP hold				

== Election 2018 ==
General elections were held on 25 July 2018.

General election 2018: NA-224 Tando Allahyar
Party	Candidate	Votes	%	±%
PPP	Zulfiqar Sattar Bachani	97,147	51.26	
GDA	Muhammad Mohsin	70,914	37.42	
Others	Others (twelve candidates)	21,462	11.32	
Turnout		197,368	54.05	
Total valid votes		189,523	96.03	
Rejected ballots		7,845	3.97	
Majority		26,233	13.84	
Registered electors		365,182		
PPP hold		Swing	N/A	

== Election 2024 ==
Elections were held on 8 February 2024. Zulfiqar Sattar Bachani won the election with 119,530 votes.

General election 2024: NA-217 Tando Allahyar
Party	Candidate	Votes	%	±%
PPP	Zulfiqar Sattar Bachani	119,530	57.32	▲6.06
GDA	Rahila Magsi	73,778	35.38	▼2.04
Others	Others (thirteen candidates)	15,215	7.30	
Turnout		215,748	47.77	▼6.28
Total valid votes		208,523	96.65	
Rejected ballots		7,225	3.35	
Majority		45,752	21.94	▲8.10
Registered electors		451,632		
PPP hold				

== See also ==
- NA-216 Matiari
- NA-218 Hyderabad-I
