= NA-173 Rahim Yar Khan-V =

Constituency of the National Assembly of Pakistan

- Constituency for the National Assembly of Pakistan
- Region: Sadiqabad Tehsil (partly) and Rahim Yar Khan Tehsil (partly) of Rahim Yar Khan District
- Electorate: 484,989

Current constituency
- Party: Pakistan People's Party
- Member: Makhdoom Syed Mustafa Mehmood
- Created from: NA-195 Rahim Yar Khan-IV

NA-173 Rahim Yar Khan-V (این اے-173، رحیم یار خان-5) is a constituency for the National Assembly of Pakistan.

== Election 2002 ==
General elections were held on 10 October 2002. Jahangir Khan Tareen of PML-Q won by 38,964 votes.

General election 2002: NA-195 Rahim Yar Khan-IV
Party	Candidate	Votes	%	±%
PML(Q)	Jahangir Khan Tareen	62,571	55.29	
PPP	Makhdoom Amad-Ud-Din	46,527	41.11	
MMA	Muhammad Riaz Noori	4,071	3.60	
Turnout		115,927	44.09	
Total valid votes		113,169	97.62	
Rejected ballots		2,758	2.38	
Majority		16,044	14.18	
Registered electors		262,927		

== Election 2008 ==
General elections were held on 18 February 2008. Jahangir Khan Tareen of PML(F) won by 84,577 votes.

General election 2008: NA-195 Rahim Yar Khan-IV
Party	Candidate	Votes	%	±%
PML(F)	Jahangir Khan Tareen	84,577	60.49	
PPP	Makhdoom Amad-Ud-Din	46,056	32.94	
Others	Others (three candidates)	9,198	6.57	
Turnout		144,931	43.26	
Total valid votes		139,831	96.48	
Rejected ballots		5,100	3.52	
Majority		38,521	27.55	
Registered electors		335,006		
PML(F) gain from PML(Q)				

== By-Election 2012 ==
A by-election was held on 25 February 2012 due to the resignation of Jahangir Tareen, the previous MNA from this seat. Syed Mustafa Mehmood of the PML(F) won with 81,097 votes.

By-Election 2012: NA-195 Rahim Yar Khan-IV
Party	Candidate	Votes	%	±%
PML(F)	Syed Mustafa Mehmood	81,097	78.80	
Independent	Molvi Muhammad Tariq Chohan	17,898	17.39	
Others	Others (eight candidates)	3,923	3.81	
Turnout		104,741	38.68	
Total valid votes		102,918	98.26	
Rejected ballots		1,823	1.74	
Majority		63,199	61.41	
Registered electors		270,763		
PML(F) hold				

== Election 2013 ==
General elections were held on 11 May 2013. Makhdoom Syed Mustafa Mehmood of PPP won by 97,778 votes and became a member of the National Assembly.

General election 2013: NA-195 Rahim Yar Khan-IV
Party	Candidate	Votes	%	±%
PPP	Makhdoom Syed Mustafa Mehmood	97,778	58.43	
Independent	Makhdoom Khusro Bakhtiar	46,897	28.02	
PTI	Maryam Batool	18,347	10.96	
Others	Others (eight candidates)	4,318	2.59	
Turnout		172,577	56.07	
Total valid votes		167,340	96.97	
Rejected ballots		5,237	3.03	
Majority		50,881	30.41	
Registered electors		307,811		
PPP hold				

== Election 2018 ==
General elections were held on 25 July 2018.

General election 2018: NA-178 Rahim Yar Khan-IV
Party	Candidate	Votes	%	±%
PPP	Syed Mustafa Mehmood	93,394	47.29	
PML(N)	Muhammad Tariq	51,316	25.99	
PTI	Rais Muhammad Mehboob Ahmed	49,049	24.84	
Independent	Muhammad Safdar Khan Leghari	3,713	1.88	
Turnout		204,444	56.23	
Total valid votes		197,472	96.59	
Rejected ballots		6,972	3.41	
Majority		42,078	21.31	
Registered electors		363,566		
PPP hold				

== Election 2024 ==
General elections were held on 8 February 2024. Makhdoom Syed Mustafa Mehmood won the election with 83,120 votes.

General election 2024: NA-173 Rahim Yar Khan-V
Party	Candidate	Votes	%	±%
PPP	Makhdoom Syed Mustafa Mehmood	83,120	35.10	▼12.19
PTI	Muhammad Nabeel Dahir (Note: Filed nomination papers as PTI candidate but ECP allowed him to run as an Independent)	80,304	33.91	▲9.07
PML(N)	Uzair Tariq	47,298	19.97	▼6.02
Others	Others (fourteen candidates)	26,075	11.01	
Turnout		244,742	50.46	▼5.77
Total valid votes		236,797	96.75	
Rejected ballots		7,945	3.25	
Majority		2,816	1.19	▼20.12
Registered electors		484,989		
PPP hold				

== See also ==
- NA-172 Rahim Yar Khan-IV
- NA-174 Rahim Yar Khan-VI
