= Rahila Magsi =

Pakistani politician

Member of the Senate of Pakistan
- In office March 2015 – March 2021

Personal details
- Party: GDA (2024-present)
- Other political affiliations: PMLN (2013-2024); PMLQ (2002-2013)

Rahila Gul Magsi (Urdu: راحیلہ مگسی) is a Pakistani politician who was a member of Senate of Pakistan representing Pakistan Muslim League (N) from 2015 to 2021.

== Political career ==
She had been Nazim of Tando Allahyar District from 2005 to 2010.

In March 2013, she joined Pakistan Muslim League (N) (PML-N).

She was elected to the Senate of Pakistan as a candidate of PML-N in the 2015 Pakistani Senate election.

In 2017, the Anti-Corruption Establishment launched an inquiry against Magsi after she was found involved in embezzlement of public funds during her tenure as nazim of Tando Allahyar district. In 2018, the National Accountability Bureau (NAB) approved inquiry against her.
