= Syed Mobeen Ahmed =

Pakistani politician

Member of the National Assembly of Pakistan
- In office 13 August 2018 – 10 August 2023
- Constituency: NA-175 (Rahim Yar Khan-I)

President of IPP Bahawalpur Division
- In office 12 August 2023 – 22 November 2023
- President: Aleem Khan; Jahangir Tareen

Personal details
- Born: Rahim Yar Khan, Punjab, Pakistan
- Party: AP (2025-present)
- Other political affiliations: PMLN (2023-2025); IPP (2023); PTI (2018-2022)
- Relations: Makhdoom Syed Muhammad Masood Alam (cousin)

Syed Mobeen Ahmed (Urdu: سید مبین احمد) is a Pakistani politician who had been a member of the National Assembly of Pakistan from August 2018 till August 2023.

== Political career ==
He was elected to the National Assembly of Pakistan from Constituency NA-175 (Rahim Yar Khan-I) as a candidate of Pakistan Tehreek-e-Insaf in the 2018 Pakistani general election.
