= 2018 Pakistani general election in Punjab =

Election in Punjab

- 25 July 2018

141 General seats out of 174 seats from Punjab in the National Assembly
- Opinion polls
- Turnout: 56.69%
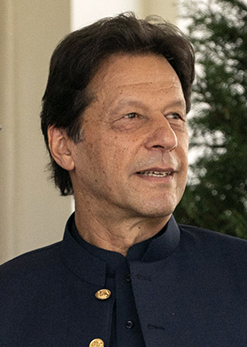

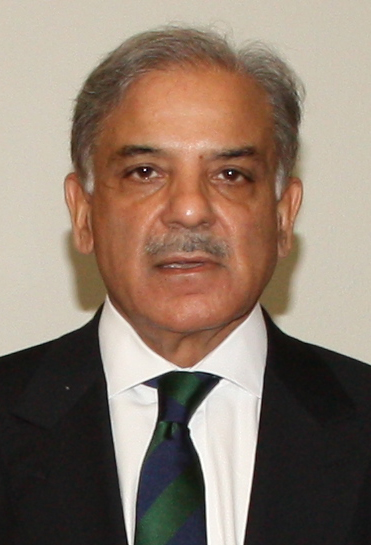
	First party	Second party
Leader	Imran Khan	Shehbaz Sharif
Party	PTI	PML(N)
Leader since	25 April 1996	13 March 2018
Leader's seat	Mianwali-I Lahore-IX (vacated)	Lahore-X; Dera Ghazi Khan-IV (lost)
Last election	18.7%, 10 seats	49.0%, 148 seats
Seats won	83	79
Seat change	▲73	▼69
Popular vote	11,166,131	10,529,723
Percentage	33.6%	31.7%
Swing	▲14.9	▼17.3
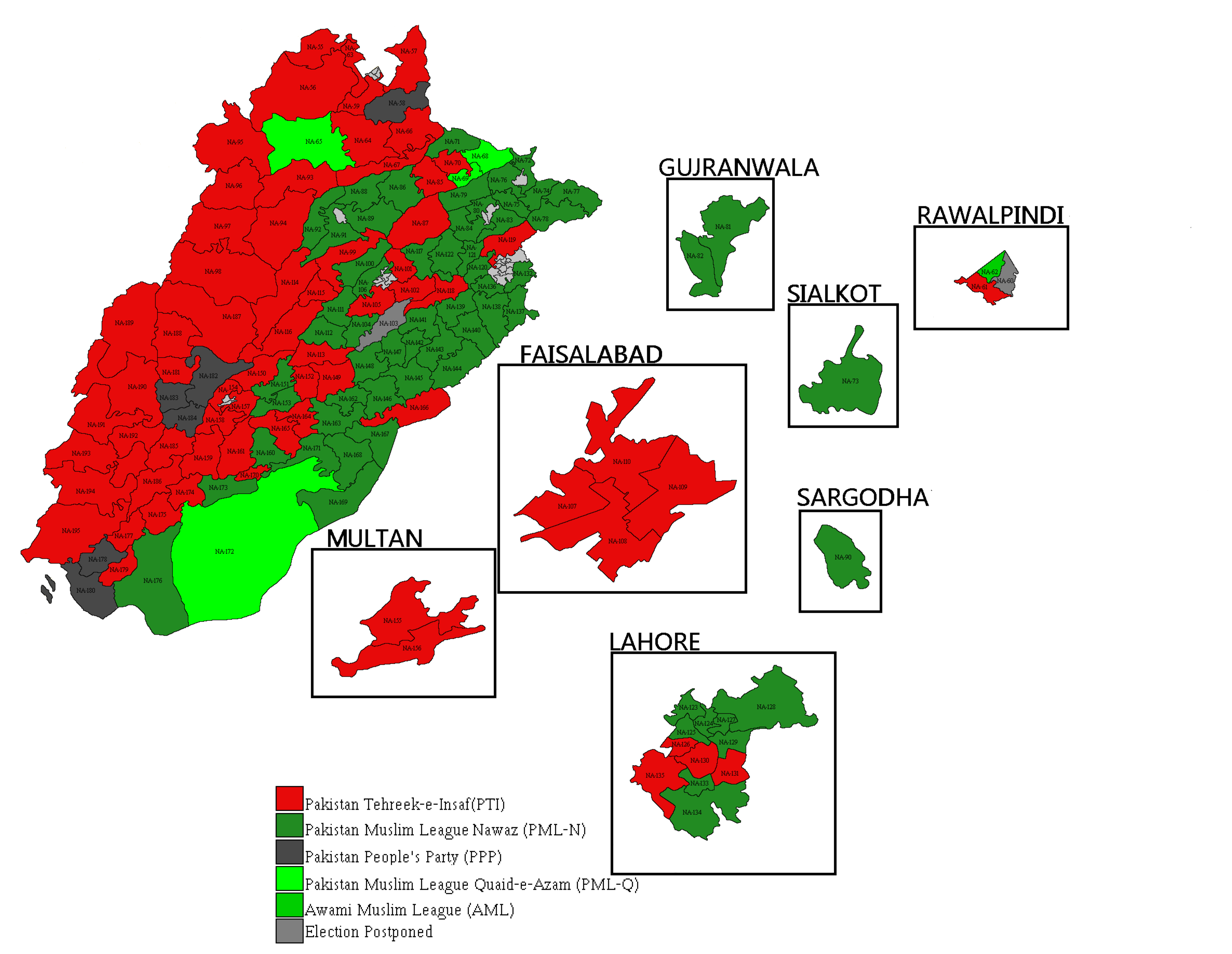

General elections were held in Punjab on 25 July 2018 to elect the 141 members of the 15th National Assembly from Punjab. The Pakistan Tehreek-e-Insaf (PTI) emerged victorious with 67 seats, followed by the Pakistan Muslim League (N) (PML(N)) with 64 seats. The PTI also won 16 of 33 reserved seats while the PML(N) won 15.

== Background ==
In the 2013 elections, the PML(N) emerged as the largest party in Punjab, achieving a landslide victory with 116 of 148 seats. The PTI, a relatively newer party, emerged as the second largest party with 8 seats. On the other hand, the Pakistan People’s Party (PPP) and Pakistan Muslim League (Q) (PML(Q)), both of which had large presences in the province after the 2008 elections, were both reduced to just 2 seats each.

Prior to these elections, the PTI and PML(Q) made a seat adjustment agreement between them on four seats of the National Assembly. These were NA-65 (Chakwal-II), NA-68 (Gujrat-I), NA-69 (Gujrat-II) and NA-172 (Bahawalpur-III).

== Results ==
Vote Share of different parties in the election.
1. PTI (33.6%)
2. PML-N (31.7%)
3. IND (18.8%)
4. TLP (5.70%)
5. PPP (5.40%)
6. PML(Q) (1.20%)
7. Other Parties (3.60%)
Seat Share of different parties in the election.
1. PTI (48.3%)
2. PML-N (44.8%)
3. PPP (4.02%)
4. PML(Q) (2.87%)
5. 0.00%
6. 0.00%

Party	Votes	%	Seats		
Party	Votes	%	General	Women	Total
Pakistan Tehreek-e-Insaf	11,166,131	33.61	68	16	84
Pakistan Muslim League (N)	10,529,723	31.70	63	15	78
Tehreek-e-Labbaik Pakistan	1,888,240	5.68	0	0	0
Pakistan Peoples Party	1,789,780	5.39	6	1	7
Pakistan Muslim League (Q)	392,419	1.18	4	1	5
Other parties	1,207,228	3.63	0	0	0
Independents	6,244,580	18.80	0	0	0
Total	33,218,101	100.00	141	33	174
Valid votes	33,218,101	97.34			
Invalid/blank votes	906,952	2.66			
Total votes	34,125,053	100.00			
Registered voters/turnout	60,197,876	56.69			
Source: Election Commission of Pakistan

=== By constituency ===
Division	Assembly Constituency	Winner				Runner-up				Margin	Turnout
Division	Assembly Constituency	Candidate	Party	Votes		Candidate	Party	Votes		Margin	Turnout
Division	Assembly Constituency	Candidate	Party	No.	%	Candidate	Party	No.	%	No.	%
Rawalpindi	NA-55 Attock-I	Tahir Sadiq	PTI	145,168	47.48	Sheikh Aftab Ahmed	PML(N)	101,773	33.29	43,395	53.47
Rawalpindi	NA-56 Attock-II	Tahir Sadiq	PTI	163,325	41.92	Malik Sohail Khan	PML(N)	99,404	25.51	63,921	62.56
Rawalpindi	NA-57 Rawalpindi-I	Sadaqat Ali Abbasi	PTI	136,249	41.72	Shahid Khaqan Abbasi	PML(N)	124,703	38.18	11,546	55.32
Rawalpindi	NA-58 Rawalpindi-II	Raja Pervez Ashraf	PPP	125,480	38.11	Choudhary Muhammad Azeem	PTI	97,084	29.48	28,396	54.00
Rawalpindi	NA-59 Rawalpindi-III	Ghulam Sarwar Khan	PTI	89,055	42.41	Chaudhry Nisar Ali Khan	IND	66,369	31.61	22,686	58.78
Rawalpindi	NA-60 Rawalpindi-IV	Election Postponed									
Rawalpindi	NA-61 Rawalpindi-V	Aamir Mehmood Kiani	PTI	105,086	50.74	Malik Ibrar Ahmed	PML(N)	60,135	29.04	44,951	51.38
Rawalpindi	NA-62 Rawalpindi-VI	Sheikh Rasheed Ahmad	AML	119,362	49.97	Danyal Chaudhry	PML(N)	91,879	38.76	26,407	52.01
Rawalpindi	NA-63 Rawalpindi-VII	Ghulam Sarwar Khan	PTI	100,986	47.67	Chaudhry Nisar Ali Khan	IND	65,767	31.05	35,219	58.14
Rawalpindi	NA-64 Chakwal-I	Zulfiqar Ali Khan Dullah	PTI	155,214	48.44	Tahir Iqbal	PML(N)	130,051	40.59	25,163	58.15
Rawalpindi	NA-65 Chakwal-II	Chaudhry Pervaiz Elahi	PML(Q)	157,497	51.31	Muhammad Faiz Malik	PML(N)	106,081	34.56	51,416	57.35
Rawalpindi	NA-66 Jhelum-I	Chaudhry Farrukh Altaf	PTI	112,356	39.96	Chaudhary Nadeem Khadim	PML(N)	92,912	33.05	19,444	51.94
Rawalpindi	NA-67 Jhelum-II	Fawad Chaudhry	PTI	93,102	44.40	Raja Matloob Mehdi	PML(N)	82,475	39.34	10,607	51.87
Gujranwala	NA-68 Gujrat-I	Chaudhry Hussain Elahi	PML(Q)	104,678	43.50	Nawabzada Ghazanfar Ali Gul	PML(N)	68,810	28.59	35,868	53.01
Gujranwala	NA-69 Gujrat-II	Chaudhry Pervaiz Elahi	PML(Q)	122,336	57.50	Chaudhary Mubashir Hussain	PML(N)	49,295	23.17	73,041	46.60
Gujranwala	NA-70 Gujrat-III	Syed Faizul Hassan Shah	PTI	95,168	38.67	Chaudhry Jaffar Iqbal	PML(N)	67,233	27.32	27,935	49.74
Gujranwala	NA-71 Gujrat-IV	Chaudhry Abid Raza	PML(N)	88,580	35.00	Muhammad Ilyas Chaudhary	PTI	81,438	32.18	7,142	50.87
Gujranwala	NA-72 Sialkot-I	Armaghan Subhani	PML(N)	129,041	49.65	Firdous Ashiq Awan	PTI	91,393	35.16	37,648	58.11
Gujranwala	NA-73 Sialkot-II	Khawaja Asif	PML(N)	116,957	46.06	Usman Dar	PTI	115,464	45.47	1,493	51.99
Gujranwala	NA-74 Sialkot-III	Ali Zahid	PML(N)	97,235	36.89	Ghulam Abbas	PTI	93,734	35.56	3,501	55.40
Gujranwala	NA-75 Sialkot-IV	Syed Iftikhar Ul Hassan	PML(N)	101,617	40.16	Ali Asjad Malhi	PTI	61,432	24.28	40,185	55.84
Gujranwala	NA-76 Sialkot-V	Shamim Ahmed	PML(N)	133,664	49.33	Muhammad Aslam Ghumman	PTI	93,190	34.39	40,474	57.68
Gujranwala	NA-77 Narowal-I	Mehnaz Aziz	PML(N)	106,366	38.16	Muhammad Tariq Anis	IND	70,596	25.33	35,770	54.86
Gujranwala	NA-78 Narowal-II	Ahsan Iqbal	PML(N)	159,651	57.47	Abrar-ul-Haq	PTI	88,250	31.77	71,401	55.06
Gujranwala	NA-79 Gujranwala-I	Nisar Ahmed Cheema	PML(N)	142,545	48.13	Muhammad Ahmed Chattha	PTI	118,709	40.08	23,836	54.66
Gujranwala	NA-80 Gujranwala-II	Chaudhry Mehmood Bashir	PML(N)	108,653	50.55	Mian Tariq Mehmood	PTI	71,937	33.47	36,716	53.36
Gujranwala	NA-81 Gujranwala-III	Khurram Dastgir Khan	PML(N)	130,837	51.76	Chaudhary Muhammad Siddique	PTI	88,166	34.88	42,671	50.58
Gujranwala	NA-82 Gujranwala-IV	Usman Ibrahim	PML(N)	117,520	50.90	Ali Ashraf Mughal	PTI	67,400	29.19	50,120	52.26
Gujranwala	NA-83 Gujranwala-V	Chaudhary Zulfiqar Bhindar	PML(N)	139,235	55.83	Rana Nazeer Ahmed Khan	PTI	75,940	30.45	63,295	55.07
Gujranwala	NA-84 Gujranwala-VI	Azhar Qayyum	PML(N)	119,612	47.62	Chaudhry Bilal Ijaz	PTI	89,728	35.72	29,884	57.36
Gujranwala	NA-85 Mandi Bahauddin-I	Haji Imtiaz Ahmad Chaudhary	PTI	99,996	36.65	Chaudhary Mushahid Raza	PML(N)	80,387	29.46	19,609	53.45
Gujranwala	NA-86 Mandi Bahauddin-II	Nasir Iqbal Bosal	PML(N)	147,105	52.15	Nazar Muhammad Gondal	PTI	80,637	28.59	66,468	55.05
Gujranwala	NA-87 Hafizabad	Chaudhary Shoukat Ali	PTI	165,618	40.92	Saira Afzal Tarar	PML(N)	157,453	38.90	8,165	59.13
Sargodha	NA-88 Sargodha-I	Mukhtar Ahmad Bharath	PML(N)	129,615	45.70	Nadeem Afzal Chan	PTI	115,622	40.77	13,993	57.11
Sargodha	NA-89 Sargodha-II	Mohsin Shahnawaz Ranjha	PML(N)	114,245	43.70	Usama Ghias Mela	PTI	113,422	43.38	823	58.93
Sargodha	NA-90 Sargodha-III	Chaudhry Hamid Hameed	PML(N)	93,948	42.11	Nadia Aziz	PTI	85,220	38.20	8,728	52.97
Sargodha	NA-91 Sargodha-IV	Zulfiqar Ali Bhatti	PML(N)	110,525	40.59	Chaudhry Aamir Sultan Cheema	PTI	110,246	40.49	279	59.46
Sargodha	NA-92 Sargodha-V	Syed Javed Hasnain Shah	PML(N)	97,013	36.83	Sahibzada Naeemuddin Sialvi	PTI	65,406	24.83	31,607	56.81
Sargodha	NA-93 Khushab-I	Umer Aslam Awan	PTI	100,448	40.49	Sumaira Malik	PML(N)	70,401	28.38	30,047	57.86
Sargodha	NA-94 Khushab-II	Malik Muhammad Ehsanullah Tiwana	PTI	93,864	39.46	Malik Shakir Bashir Awan	PML(N)	85,109	35.78	8,755	59.49
Sargodha	NA-95 Mianwali-I	Imran Khan	PTI	163,538	64.67	Haji Obaidullah Khan Shadikhel	PML(N)	50,015	19.78	113,523	54.29
Sargodha	NA-96 Mianwali-II	Amjad Ali Khan Niazi	PTI	157,422	60.27	Humair Hayat Khan Rokhri	PML(N)	54,909	21.02	102,513	57.95
Sargodha	NA-97 Bhakkar-I	Muhammad Sana Ullah Khan Masti Khel	IND	120,729	41.82	Abdul Majeed Khan	PML(N)	91,607	31.74	29,122	65.97
Sargodha	NA-98 Bhakkar-II	Muhammad Afzal Khan Dhandla	PTI	138,307	46.87	Rashid Akbar Khan	IND	133,679	45.30	4,628	67.98
Faisalabad	NA-99 Chiniot-I	Ghulam Muhammad Lali	PTI	81,330	39.33	Ghulam Abbas	IND	64,307	31.10	17,023	55.56
Faisalabad	NA-100 Chiniot-II	Qaiser Ahmed Sheikh	PML(N)	76,415	34.16	Zulfiqar Ali Shah	PTI	75,559	33.78	856	61.68
Faisalabad	NA-101 Faisalabad-I	Muhammad Asim Nazir	IND	147,812	55.31	Zafar Zulqarnain Sahi	PTI	86,575	32.39	61,237	58.19
Faisalabad	NA-102 Faisalabad-II	Malik Nawab Sher Waseer	PTI	109,708	40.20	Talal Chaudhry	PML(N)	97,869	35.86	11,839	54.67
Faisalabad	NA-103 Faisalabad-III	Election Postponed									
Faisalabad	NA-104 Faisalabad-IV	Chaudhry Shehbaz Babar	PML(N)	95,099	34.47	Sardar Dildar Ahmed Cheema	PTI	73,320	26.57	21,779	55.88
Faisalabad	NA-105 Faisalabad-V	Chaudhry Raza Nasrullah Ghumman	PTI	77,862	31.10	Muhammad Masood Nazir	IND	69,211	27.65	8,651	56.84
Faisalabad	NA-106 Faisalabad-VI	Rana Sanaullah	PML(N)	106,319	44.40	Nisar Ahmad Jutt	PTI	103,799	43.35	2,520	58.92
Faisalabad	NA-107 Faisalabad-VII	Khurram Shehzad	PTI	126,441	51.41	Akram Ansari	PML(N)	102,159	41.54	24,282	57.52
Faisalabad	NA-108 Faisalabad-VIII	Farrukh Habib	PTI	112,740	46.47	Abid Sher Ali	PML(N)	111,529	45.98	1,211	57.01
Faisalabad	NA-109 Faisalabad-IX	Faiz Ullah Kamoka	PTI	122,905	51.26	Mian Abdul Manan	PML(N)	94,476	39.40	28,429	58.05
Faisalabad	NA-110 Faisalabad-X	Raja Riaz Ahmad Khan	PTI	114,215	45.76	Rana Afzal Khan	PML(N)	108,172	43.34	6,043	57.01
Faisalabad	NA-111 Toba Tek Singh-I	Chaudhary Khalid Javed	PML(N)	110,556	44.84	Usama Hamza	PTI	85,448	34.65	25,108	58.32
Faisalabad	NA-112 Toba Tek Singh-II	Muhammad Junaid Anwar Chaudhry	PML(N)	125,303	45.94	Chaudhry Muhammad Ashfaq	PTI	121,031	44.37	4,272	59.22
Faisalabad	NA-113 Toba Tek Singh-III	Riaz Fatyana	PTI	128,274	50.31	Asad Ur Rehman	PML(N)	106,018	41.58	22,256	59.90
Faisalabad	NA-114 Jhang-I	Sahabzada Muhammad Mehboob Sultan	PTI	106,043	35.98	Faisal Saleh Hayat	PPP	105,454	35.78	589	62.45
Faisalabad	NA-115 Jhang-II	Ghulam Bibi Bharwana	PTI	91,434	36.01	Muhammad Ahmed Ludhianvi	IND	68,616	27.02	22,818	57.39
Faisalabad	NA-116 Jhang-III	Muhammad Ameer Sultan	PTI	90,649	32.10	Muhammad Asif Muavia Sial	IND	70,842	25.09	19,807	62.15
Lahore	NA-117 Nankana Sahib-I	Barjees Tahir	PML(N)	71,891	30.74	Chaudhry Tariq Mehmood Bajwa	IND	68,995	29.50	2,896	58.40
Lahore	NA-118 Nankana Sahib-II	Ijaz Shah	PTI	63,918	30.60	Shizra Mansab Ali Khan	PML(N)	61,395	29.39	2,523	58.73
Lahore	NA-119 Sheikhupura-I	Rahat Amanullah	PTI	110,231	47.99	Rana Afzaal Hussain	PML(N)	94,072	40.96	16,159	56.04
Lahore	NA-120 Sheikhupura-II	Rana Tanveer Hussain	PML(N)	99,674	46.08	Ali Asghar Manda	PTI	74,165	34.29	25,509	59.35
Lahore	NA-121 Sheikhupura-III	Mian Javed Latif	PML(N)	101,622	42.30	Muhammad Saeed Virk	PTI	71,308	29.68	30,314	56.16
Lahore	NA-122 Sheikhupura-IV	Irfan Dogar	PML(N)	96,000	36.43	Ali Salman	PTI	64,616	24.52	31,384	57.83
Lahore	NA-123 Lahore-I	Muhammad Riaz Malik	PML(N)	97,193	47.67	Mehar Wajid Azeem	PTI	72,535	35.58	24,658	51.13
Lahore	NA-124 Lahore-II	Hamza Shahbaz Sharif	PML(N)	146,294	57.39	Muhammad Nauman Qaiser	PTI	80,981	31.77	65,313	48.50
Lahore	NA-125 Lahore-III	Waheed Alam Khan	PML(N)	122,327	48.88	Yasmin Rashid	PTI	105,857	42.30	16,470	52.38
Lahore	NA-126 Lahore-IV	Muhammad Hammad Azhar	PTI	105,734	46.30	Mehr Ishtiaq Ahmed	PML(N)	102,677	44.96	3,057	52.26
Lahore	NA-127 Lahore-V	Ali Pervaiz Malik	PML(N)	113,265	54.16	Jamshed Iqbal Cheema	PTI	66,818	31.95	46,447	50.75
Lahore	NA-128 Lahore-VI	Shaikh Rohale Asghar	PML(N)	98,199	52.49	Chaudhary Ijaz Ahmad Dayal	PTI	52,774	28.21	45,425	55.21
Lahore	NA-129 Lahore-VII	Sardar Ayaz Sadiq	PML(N)	103,021	47.98	Aleem Khan	PTI	94,879	44.19	8,142	53.96
Lahore	NA-130 Lahore-VIII	Shafqat Mahmood	PTI	127,405	50.51	Khawaja Ahmed Hassan	PML(N)	104,625	41.48	22,780	52.99
Lahore	NA-131 Lahore-IX	Imran Khan	PTI	84,313	44.68	Khawaja Saad Rafique	PML(N)	83,633	44.32	680	52.59
Lahore	NA-132 Lahore-X	Shehbaz Sharif	PML(N)	95,834	51.26	Ch Muhammad Mansha Sindhu	PTI	49,093	26.26	46,741	60.45
Lahore	NA-133 Lahore-XI	Muhammad Pervaiz Malik	PML(N)	89,678	47.07	Ejaz Chaudhary	PTI	77,231	40.53	12,447	51.89
Lahore	NA-134 Lahore-XII	Rana Mubashir Iqbal	PML(N)	76,291	53.88	Malik Zaheer Abbas	PTI	45,991	32.48	30,300	53.40
Lahore	NA-135 Lahore-XIII	Malik Karamat Khokhar	PTI	64,765	47.49	Malik Saif ul Malook Khokhar	PML(N)	55,431	40.65	9,334	53.94
Lahore	NA-136 Lahore-XIV	Afzal Khokhar	PML(N)	88,831	54.55	Malik Asad Ali Khokhar	PTI	44,669	27.43	44,162	56.08
Lahore	NA-137 Kasur-I	Saad Waseem Akhtar Sheikh	PML(N)	121,207	45.62	Aseff Ahmad Ali	PTI	42,930	16.16	78,277	58.91
Lahore	NA-138 Kasur-II	Malik Rasheed Ahmed Khan	PML(N)	109,785	42.36	Rashid Tufail	PTI	78,458	30.27	31,327	62.38
Lahore	NA-139 Kasur-III	Rana Muhammad Ishaq	PML(N)	121,767	43.89	Azeemuddin Zahid Lakhvi	PTI	112,893	40.69	8,874	59.99
Lahore	NA-140 Kasur-IV	Sardar Talib Hassan Nakai	PTI	124,644	44.19	Rana Muhammad Hayat	PML(N)	124,395	44.11	249	60.65
Sahiwal	NA-141 Okara-I	Chaudhry Nadeem Abbas	PML(N)	92,841	35.32	Syed Samsam Bukhari	PTI	60,217	22.91	32,624	60.23
Sahiwal	NA-142 Okara-II	Chaudhry Riaz-ul-Haq	PML(N)	140,733	59.84	Rao Hasan Sikandar	PTI	76,592	32.57	64,141	56.81
Sahiwal	NA-143 Okara-III	Rao Muhammad Ajmal Khan	PML(N)	142,988	58.06	Syed Gulzar Sibtain Shah	PTI	89,177	36.21	53,811	58.22
Sahiwal	NA-144 Okara-IV	Muhammad Moeen Wattoo	PML(N)	118,670	49.15	Manzoor Wattoo	IND	105,585	43.73	13,085	57.42
Sahiwal	NA-145 Pakpattan-I	Ahmad Raza Maneka	PML(N)	118,581	42.34	Muhammad Shah Khagga	PTI	90,683	32.38	27,898	57.62
Sahiwal	NA-146 Pakpattan-II	Rana Iradat Sharif Khan	PML(N)	138,789	46.42	Mian Muhammad Amjad Joya	PTI	1,01,509	33.95	37,280	59.55
Sahiwal	NA-147 Sahiwal-I	Syed Imran Ahmed	PML(N)	120,924	45.77	Nouraiz Shakoor	PTI	86,821	32.87	34,103	56.18
Sahiwal	NA-148 Sahiwal-II	Chaudhry Muhammad Ashraf	PML(N)	129,027	47.85	Malik Muhammad Yar Dhakoo	PTI	87,848	32.58	41,179	56.19
Sahiwal	NA-149 Sahiwal-III	Rai Muhammad Murtaza Iqbal	PTI	140,338	50.17	Chaudhry Muhammad Tufail	PML(N)	114,244	40.85	26,144	57.15
Multan	NA-150 Khanewal-I	Fakhar Imam	IND	101,520	45.56	Raza Hayat Hiraj	PTI	92,039	41.30	9,481	59.99
Multan	NA-151 Khanewal-II	Muhammad Khan Daha	PML(N)	111,325	47.54	Ahmad Yar Hiraj	PTI	109,796	46.89	1,529	58.72
Multan	NA-152 Khanewal-III	Zahoor Hussain Qureshi	PTI	109,257	47.08	Pir Muhammad Aslam Bodla	PML(N)	99,137	42.72	10,120	59.00
Multan	NA-153 Khanewal-IV	Chaudhry Iftikhar Nazir	PML(N)	106,467	42.95	Malik Ghulam Murtaza	PTI	77,170	31.13	29,297	61.41
Multan	NA-154 Multan-I	Malik Ahmed Hussain Dehar	PTI	74,220	37.09	Abdul Qadir Gillani	PPP	64,257	32.11	10,021	57.04
Multan	NA-155 Multan-II	Malik Aamir Dogar	PTI	135,872	57.38	Sheikh Tariq Rashid	PML(N)	78,861	33.30	54,856	49.27
Multan	NA-156 Multan-III	Shah Mehmood Qureshi	PTI	116,383	53.17	Amir Saeed Ansari	PML(N)	84,969	38.82	31,414	49.87
Multan	NA-157 Multan-IV	Zain Qureshi	PTI	77,373	35.25	Ali Musa Gilani	PPP	70,778	32.24	6,595	57.32
Multan	NA-158 Multan-V	Ibrahim Khan	PTI	83,304	34.43	Yousaf Raza Gillani	PPP	74,443	30.76	8,861	56.76
Multan	NA-159 Multan-VI	Rana Muhammad Qasim Noon	PTI	102,754	45.26	Dewan Muhammad Zulqarnain Bukhari	PML(N)	99,477	43.82	3,232	56.55
Multan	NA-160 Lodhran-I	Abdul Rehman Khan Kanju	PML(N)	125,810	46.97	Muhammad Akhtar Khan Kanju	PTI	1,15,541	43.14	10,261	60.26
Multan	NA-161 Lodhran-II	Mian Muhammad Shafiq	PTI	121,300	46.86	Siddique Khan Baloch	PML(N)	116,093	44.85	5,207	57.73
Multan	NA-162 Vehari-I	Choudhry Faqir Ahmad	PML(N)	81,977	35.59	Ayesha Nazir Jutt	IND	64,796	28.13	17,181	55.93
Multan	NA-163 Vehari-II	Syed Sajid Mehdi	PML(N)	70,344	33.16	Ishaq Khan Khakwani	PTI	56,977	26.86	13,367	57.99
Multan	NA-164 Vehari-III	Tahir Iqbal	PTI	82,213	35.78	Tehmina Daultana	PML(N)	68,250	29.70	13,963	57.66
Multan	NA-165 Vehari-IV	Aurangzeb Khan Khichi	PTI	99,393	46.45	Saeed Ahmed Khan	PML(N)	65,575	30.64	33,813	56.43
Bahawalpur	NA-166 Bahawalnagar-I	Abdul Ghaffar Wattoo	IND	102,385	46.47	Syed Muhammad Asghar Shah	PTI	93,291	42.34	9,094	63.16
Bahawalpur	NA-167 Bahawalnagar-II	Alam Dad Lalika	PML(N)	91,540	43.65	Mumtaz Matyana	PTI	49,772	23.73	41,768	56.94
Bahawalpur	NA-168 Bahawalnagar-III	Ihsan ul Haq Bajwa	PML(N)	124,218	54.48	Fatima Tahir Cheema	PTI	74,517	32.68	49,701	57.69
Bahawalpur	NA-169 Bahawalnagar-IV	Noor Ul Hassan Tanvir	PML(N)	91,763	37.03	Ijaz-ul-Haq	PML(Z)	72,461	29.24	19,302	60.34
Bahawalpur	NA-170 Bahawalpur-I	Muhammad Farooq Azam Malik	PTI	84,495	44.81	Baligh Ur Rehman	PML(N)	74,694	39.61	9,801	52.29
Bahawalpur	NA-171 Bahawalpur-II	Riaz Hussain Pirzada	PML(N)	99,202	40.87	Chaudhary Naeemuddin Warraich	PTI	88,297	36.38	10,905	59.95
Bahawalpur	NA-172 Bahawalpur-III	Tariq Bashir Cheema	PML(Q)	106,383	46.40	Saud Majeed	PML(N)	101,971	44.48	4,412	64.08
Bahawalpur	NA-173 Bahawalpur-IV	Najibuddin Awaisi	PML(N)	86,142	39.43	Khadija Aamir Yar Malik	PTI	60,211	27.56	25,931	56.02
Bahawalpur	NA-174 Bahawalpur-V	Makhdoom Syed Sami Ul Hassan Gillani	PTI	63,884	32.93	Prince Bahawal Abbas Abbasi	IND	58,092	29.94	5,792	52.68
Bahawalpur	NA-175 Rahim Yar Khan-I	Syed Mobeen Ahmed	PTI	97,347	41.03	Khwaja Ghulam Rasool Koreja	PPP	89,292	37.64	8,055	56.66
Bahawalpur	NA-176 Rahim Yar Khan-II	Sheikh Fayyaz Ud Din	PML(N)	78,590	37.19	Mian Ghous Muhammad	PTI	59,937	28.36	18,653	54.90
Bahawalpur	NA-177 Rahim Yar Khan-III	Khusro Bakhtiar	PTI	100,804	46.50	Makhdoom Shahabudin	PPP	64,660	29.83	36,144	54.74
Bahawalpur	NA-178 Rahim Yar Khan-IV	Mustafa Mehmood	PPP	93,394	47.29	Muhammad Tariq	PML(N)	51,316	25.99	42,078	56.23
Bahawalpur	NA-179 Rahim Yar Khan-V	Javed Iqbal Warraich	PTI	110,877	44.44	Mian Imtiaz Ahmed	PML(N)	88,871	35.62	22,006	56.38
Bahawalpur	NA-180 Rahim Yar Khan-VI	Makhdoom Syed Murtaza Mehmood	PPP	72,062	32.59	Sardar Muhammad Arshad Khan Leghari	PML(N)	55,085	24.91	16,977	57.17
D G Khan	NA-181 Muzaffargarh-I	Muhammad Shabir Ali	IND	64,154	32.33	Sultan Mehmood	IND	54,484	27.46	9,670	60.76
D G Khan	NA-182 Muzaffargarh-II	Mehr Irshad Ahmed Sial	PPP	53,094	26.84	Jamshed Dasti	ARP	50,618	25.59	2,476	59.12
D G Khan	NA-183 Muzaffargarh-III	Raza Rabbani Khar	PPP	54,960	26.86	Mian Fayyaz Hussain Chhajrra	IND	39,962	19.53	14,998	61.02
D G Khan	NA-184 Muzaffargarh-IV	Iftikhar Ahmed Khan Babar	PPP	54,879	27.59	Malik Ahmad Karim Qaswar Langrial	IND	41,753	20.99	13,126	56.00
D G Khan	NA-185 Muzaffargarh-V	Syed Basit Sultan Bukhari	IND	94,672	48.11	Muhammad Moazam Ali Khan Jatoi	PTI	73,185	37.19	21,487	58.23
D G Khan	NA-186 Muzaffargarh-VI	Sardar Aamir Talal Khan Gopang	PTI	63,564	33.16	Daud Khan Jatoi	PPP	53,690	28.00	9,866	60.54
D G Khan	NA-187 Layyah-I	Abdul Majeed Khan Niazi	PTI	94,477	33.49	Sardar Bahadur Ahmed Khan	IND	88,544	31.39	5,933	63.71
D G Khan	NA-188 Layyah-II	Niaz Ahmed Jhakkar	PTI	109,854	39.20	Syed Muhammad Saqlain Shah Bukhari	PML(N)	103,152	36.81	6,702	64.21
D G Khan	NA-189 Dera Ghazi Khan-I	Khawaja Sheraz Mehmood	PTI	78,824	47.14	Sardar Mir Badshah Qaisrani	IND	39,562	23.66	39,262	52.45
D G Khan	NA-190 Dera Ghazi Khan-II	Amjad Farooq Khan	IND	72,300	45.72	Zulfiqar Ali Khosa	PTI	72,171	45.64	129	51.74
D G Khan	NA-191 Dera Ghazi Khan-III	Zartaj Gul	PTI	79,932	42.97	Awais Ahmad Khan Leghari	PML(N)	54,571	29.34	25,361	50.58
D G Khan	NA-192 Dera Ghazi Khan-IV	Sardar Muhammad Khan Laghari	PTI	80,683	50.19	Shehbaz Sharif	PML(N)	67,753	42.15	12,930	54.88
D G Khan	NA-193 Rajanpur-I	Sardar Muhammad Jaffar Khan Leghari	PTI	81,358	48.94	Sardar Sher Ali Gorchani	IND	46,748	28.12	32,506	55.76
D G Khan	NA-194 Rajanpur-II	Sardar Nasrullah Khan Dreshak	PTI	73,839	42.30	Hafeez-ur-Rehman Dreshak	IND	64,739	37.08	9,100	60.11
D G Khan	NA-195 Rajanpur-III	Sardar Riaz Mehmood Khan Mazari	PTI	89,829	53.53	Khizer Hussain Mazari	PML(N)	69,113	41.18	20,716	63.78
