= Rana Muhammad Hayat =

Pakistani politician

- رانا محمد حیات
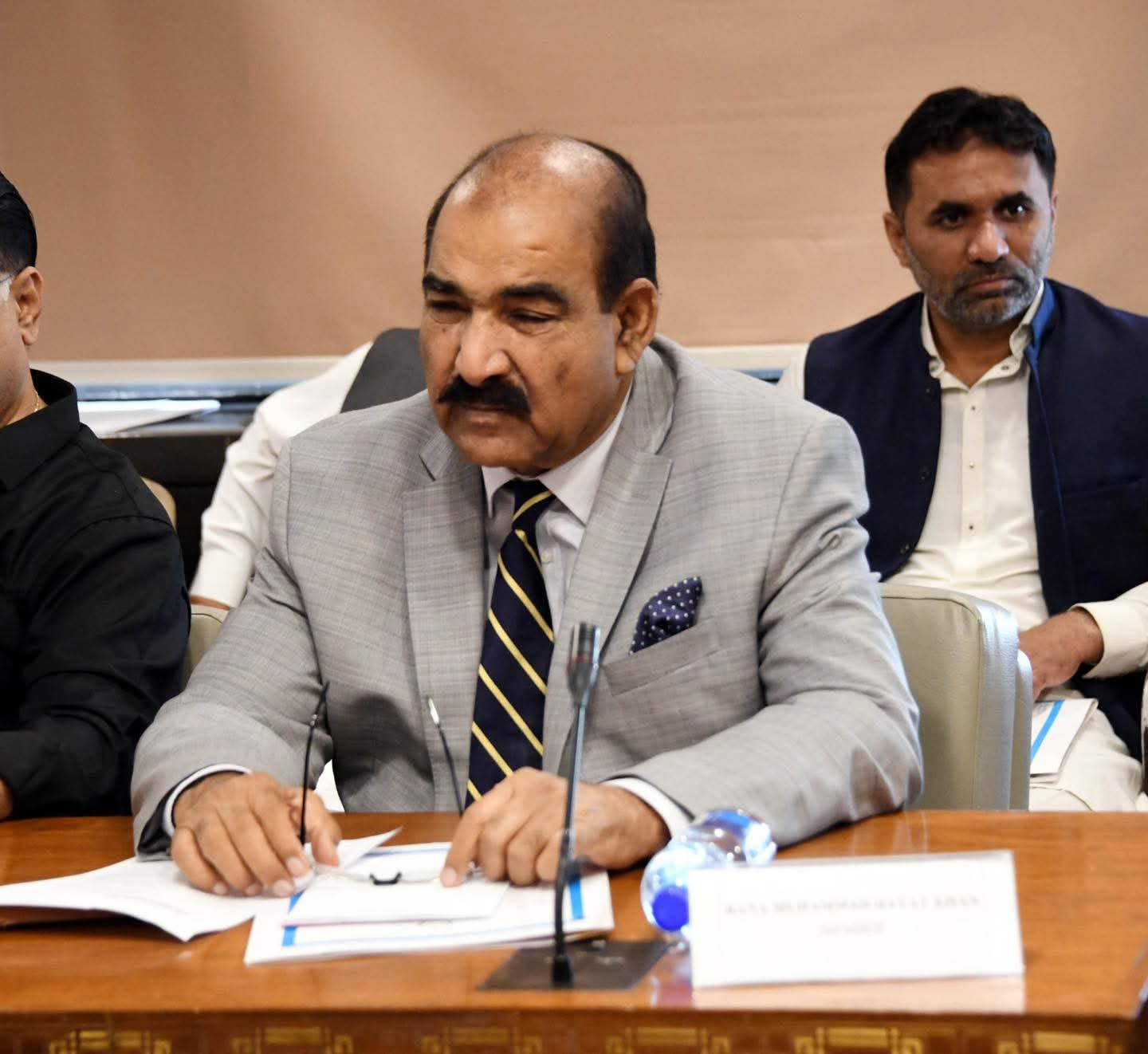

Member of the National Assembly of Pakistan
- Incumbent
- Assumed office 29 February 2024
- Constituency: NA-134 Kasur-IV
- In office 1 June 2013 – 31 May 2018
- Constituency: NA-142 (Kasur-V)
- In office 3 February 1997 – 12 October 1999
- Constituency: NA-108 Kasur-III
- In office 3 November 1990 – 18 July 1993
- Constituency: NA-108 Kasur-III

Personal details
- Born: 24 December 1950 (age 75) Phool Nagar, Punjab, Pakistan
- Party: PMLN (2013-present)
- Relations: Rana Sikandar Hayat (Son); Rana Muhammad Ishaq (brother); Rana Muhammad Iqbal Khan (cousin); Phool Muhammad Khan (uncle)

Rana Muhammad Hayat Khan (Urdu: رانا محمد حیات خان; born 24 December 1950) is a Pakistani politician who has been a member of the National Assembly of Pakistan since February 2024 and previously served in this position from 1990 to 1993, 1997 to 1999 and June 2013 to May 2018.

== Early life ==
He was born on 24 December 1950 to father Rana Nisar Muhammad Khan.

== Political career ==
Rana Hayat was elected as a member of the National Assembly as a candidate of IJI from constituency NA-108 in the Pakistani general election in 1990. Rana was re-elected as a member of the National Assembly as a candidate of PML-N in the Pakistani general election in 1997.

He ran for the seat of the National Assembly of Pakistan as an independent candidate from Constituency NA-141 (Kasur-IV) and Constituency NA-142 (Kasur-V) in the 2002 Pakistani general election but was unsuccessful. He received 348 votes from Constituency NA-141 (Kasur-IV) and received 43,921 votes from Constituency NA-142 (Kasur-V) and lost both seats to Muhammad Asif Nakai. In the same election, he also ran for the seat of the Provincial Assembly of the Punjab from Constituency PP-183 (Kasur-IX) as an independent candidate but was unsuccessful. He received 19,644 votes and lost the seat to Sardar Pervaiz Hasan Nakai, a candidate of the Pakistan Muslim League (Q) (PML-Q).

He ran for the seat of the National Assembly as a candidate of Pakistan Muslim League (N) (PML-N) from Constituency NA-142 (Kasur-V) in by-election in 2003 but was unsuccessful. He received 46,042 votes and lost the seat to Sardar Talib Hassan Nakai.

He ran for the seat of the National Assembly as a candidate of PML-N from Constituency NA-142 (Kasur-V) in the 2008 Pakistani general election but was unsuccessful. He received 19,512 votes and lost the seat to Muhammad Asif Nakai. In the same election, he also ran for the Provincial Assembly of the Punjab seat from Constituency PP-183 (Kasur-IX) a candidate of PML-N but was unsuccessful. He received 19,512 votes and lost the seat to Muhammad Asif Nakai.

He was elected to the National Assembly as a candidate of PML-N from Constituency NA-142 (Kasur-V) in the 2013 Pakistani general election. He received 85,243 votes and defeated Sardar Talib Hassan Nakai.

He ran for the seat of the National Assembly as a candidate of PML(N) from NA-140 Kasur-IV in the 2018 Pakistani general election, but was unsuccessful. He was defeated by Sardar Talib Hassan Nakai, a candidate of Pakistan Tehreek-e-Insaf (PTI).

He was re-elected to the National Assembly as a candidate of PML(N) from NA-134 Kasur-IV in the 2024 Pakistani general election. He received votes and defeated Sidra Faisal, an Independent politician candidate supported by PTI .

== Personal life ==
His brother Rana Muhammad Ishaq has also served as a member of the National Assembly of Pakistan. His uncle Phool Muhammad Khan was a provincial lawmaker, as is his cousin Rana Muhammad Iqbal Khan who served as a speaker of the Punjab provincial assembly.
