= Rana Muhammad Iqbal Khan =

Pakistani politician

Chairman Standing Committee on Housing, Urban Development and Public Health Engineering
- In office 25 February 2019 – 14 January 2023

Speaker of the Provincial Assembly of Punjab
- In office 11 April 2008 – 16 August 2018
- Deputy: Sardar Sher Ali Gorchani
- Preceded by: Chaudhry Muhammad Afzal Sahi
- Succeeded by: Chaudhry Pervaiz Elahi

Acting Governor of Punjab
- In office 29 January 2015 – 7 May 2015
- Preceded by: Mohammad Sarwar
- Succeeded by: Malik Muhammad Rafique Rajwana
- In office 4 January 2011 – 13 January 2011
- Preceded by: Salmaan Taseer
- Succeeded by: Latif Khosa

Provincial Minister of Punjab for Livestock and Dairy Development
- In office 1997–1999
- Chief Minister: Shehbaz Sharif

Member of the Provincial Assembly of the Punjab
- In office 15 August 2018 – 14 January 2023
- Constituency: PP-181 Kasur-VIII
- In office 1 June 2013 – 31 May 2018
- Constituency: PP-184 (Kasur-X)
- In office 9 April 2008 – 20 March 2013
- Constituency: PP-184 (Kasur-X)
- In office 1997–1999
- Constituency: PP-149 (Kasur)
- In office 1993–1996
- Constituency: PP-149 (Kasur)

Chairman District Council of Kasur (Mayor)
- In office 1990–1993
- In office 1987–1990

Vice-Chairman District Council of Kasur (Deputy-Mayor)
- In office 1983–1987

Chairman Markaz Council and Union Council of Phool Nagar
- In office 1979–1983

Personal details
- Born: 20 April 1945 (age 81) Kasur, Punjab, British India (now Pakistan)
- Party: PMLN (1993-present)
- Relations: Phool Muhammad Khan (father); Rana Muhammad Hayat (cousin); Rana Muhammad Ishaq (cousin)
- Children: 7

Rana Muhammad Iqbal Khan is a Pakistani politician who is the current Provincial Minister of Law of Punjab. He had also been the Speaker of the Provincial Assembly of the Punjab from 2008 to May 2018. He had been a Member of the Provincial Assembly of the Punjab, from 1993 to 1999, again from 2008 to May 2018 and again from August 2018 till January 2023. He has served as acting Governor of Punjab numerous times between 2008 and 2015. On 13 October 2025, he took oath as Provincial Minister of Law of Punjab.

== Early life and education ==
Khan was born on 20 April 1945 in Karnal district, India to Phool Muhammad Khan in a Muslim Rajput family.

He received his early education from Bhai Pheru (now Phool Nagar). He graduated from Govt. Islamia College Civil Lines in 1968 from where he obtained a degree of Bachelor of Arts. After completing his LL.B from Punjab University Law College (PULC).

Khan is an advocate by profession. He served as Secretary of the Chunian Tehsil Bar Association from 1975 to 1976.

== Political career ==
Khan began his political career as Chairman of the Union Council, Phool Nagar from 1979 to 1983. He remained Vice Chairman of District Council, Kasur from 1983 to 1987 and as Chairman District Council Kasur from 1987 to 1993. His nephew Rana Sikandar Hayat also became Chairman District Council Kasur in 2016.

He was re-elected to the Provincial Assembly of the Punjab as a candidate of Pakistan Muslim League (N) (PML-N) from Constituency PP-149 (Kasur) in the 1993 Pakistani general election. He received 31,457 votes and defeated Malik Mehr Din, a candidate of Pakistan Muslim League (J) (PML-J).

He was re-elected to the Provincial Assembly of the Punjab as a candidate of PML-N from Constituency PP-149 (Kasur) in the 1997 Pakistani general election. He received 35,049 votes and defeated a candidate of PML-J. During his tenure as Member of Punjab Assembly, he served as Provincial Minister of Punjab for Livestock and Dairy Development. He also remained Provincial Minister of Punjab for Forest, Wildlife, Fisheries and Tourism between 1997 and 1999.

He ran for the seat of the Provincial Assembly of the Punjab as an independent candidate from Constituency PP-184 (Kasur-X) in the 2002 Pakistani general election but was unsuccessful. He received 20488 votes and lost the seat to Rana Sarfraz Ahmed Khan, a candidate of Pakistan Muslim League (Q) (PML-Q).

He was re-elected to the Provincial Assembly of the Punjab as a candidate of PML-N from Constituency PP-184 (Kasur-X) in the 2008 Pakistani general election. He received 27,689 votes and defeated Rana Sarfraz Ahmed Khan, a candidate of PML-Q. In April 2008, he was elected as the Speaker of the Provincial Assembly of the Punjab where he continued to serve until 2013.

In October 2008, he became acting Governor of Punjab. In 2011, he became acting Governor of Punjab following the assassination of Salman Taseer.

He was re-elected to the Provincial Assembly of the Punjab as a candidate of PML-N from Constituency PP-184 (Kasur-X) in the 2013 Pakistani general election. In June 2013, he was re-elected as the Speaker of the Provincial Assembly of the Punjab after securing 297 votes.

In 2015, Khan was appointed acting Governor of Punjab following the resignation of Mohammad Sarwar.

In November 2017, he became the first speaker of the Punjab Assembly to serve two complete assemblies full term from 2008 to 2018 and also became the longest-serving speaker of the Punjab Assembly in the office for more than nine years, consecutively.

He was re-elected to Provincial Assembly of the Punjab as a candidate of PML-N from Constituency PP-181 (Kasur-VIII) in the 2018 Pakistani general election.

On 16 August 2018, he was replaced by Chaudhry Pervaiz Elahi as speaker of the Punjab Assembly.
