= Rana Muhammad Ishaq =

Politician in Pakistan

Rana Muhammad Ishaq Khan
- رانا محمد اسحاق خان

Member of the National Assembly of Pakistan
- In office 13 August 2018 – 10 August 2023
- Constituency: NA-139 (Kasur-III)
- In office 2008 – 31 May 2018
- Constituency: NA-141 (Kasur-IV)

Personal details
- Born: 5 October 1957 (age 69) Kasur, Punjab, Pakistan
- Party: PMLN
- Relations: Rana Muhammad Hayat (brother); Rana Muhammad Iqbal Khan (cousin); Phool Muhammad Khan (uncle)

Rana Muhammad Ishaq Khan (Urdu: رانا محمد اسحاق خان; born 5 October 1957) is a Pakistani politician. Originating from Kasur, Khan was the mayor of his city in 1997, and had been a member of the National Assembly of Pakistan since 2008 for three consecutive terms. He has served as the Parliamentary Secretary for Finance and Revenue.

== Early life ==
He was born on 5 October 1957 to father Rana Nisar Muhammad Khan.

== Political career ==
His political career started in the late 1990s. He was elected as Mayor Kasur in 1997. He ran for the seat of the National Assembly of Pakistan as a candidate of the Pakistan Muslim League (N) (PML-N) from Constituency NA-141 (Kasur-IV) in the 2002 Pakistani general election but was unsuccessful. He received 42,518 votes and lost the seat to Muhammad Asif Nakai. He was then elected tehsil nazim (Pattoki Tehsil) while being in opposition when the ruling party of punjab was Pakistan Muslim League (Q).

He was elected to the National Assembly for the first time as a candidate of the PML-N from Constituency NA-141 (Kasur-IV) in the 2008 Pakistani general election. He received 58,807 votes and defeated Muhammad Asif Nakai.

He was re-elected to the National Assembly as a candidate of the PML-N from Constituency NA-141 (Kasur-IV) in the 2013 Pakistani general election. He received 96,737 votes and defeated Sardar Muhammad Asif Nakai.

He was elected again to the National Assembly as a candidate of the PML-N from Constituency NA-139 (Kasur-III) defeating PTI candidate Azeem ud din Lakhvi in the 2018 Pakistani general election. He is currently the Parliamentary Secretary for Finance and Revenue.

He has been defeated now to the National Assembly as a candidate of the PML-N from Constituency NA-133 (Kasur-III) by PTI candidate Azeem ud din Lakhvi in the 2024 Pakistani general election.

== Personal life ==
His brother Rana Muhammad Hayat is a former member parliament from NA-142 (Kasur-V) 2013-2018. His cousin Rana Muhammad Iqbal Khan is currently a member of the provincial assembly and held the office of the speaker Punjab assembly for two consecutive terms from 2008-2018.
