= Imtiaz Ahmed =

Imtiaz Ahmed may refer to:

- Imtiaz Ahmed (brigadier) (b.1935), Pakistani general
- Imtiaz Ahmed (cricketer) (1928–2016), Pakistani Test cricketer
- Imtiyaz Ahmed (b.1985), Indian cricketer who plays for Uttar Pradesh
- Imtiaz Ahmad, Indian sociologist and academic
- Mian Imtiaz Ahmed (b.1961), Pakistani politician
- Syed Imtiaz Ahmed (1954–2020), Indian cricketer
