= PP-184 Kasur-X =

Constituency, Punjab

- Constituency for the Provincial Assembly of Punjab
- Region: Pattoki Tehsil (partly) including Phoolnagar town of Kasur District

Current constituency
- Created from: PP-184 Kasur-X (2002-2018); PP-181 Kasur-VIII (2018-2023)

PP-184 Kasur-X (پی پی-184، قصور-10) is a Constituency of Provincial Assembly of Punjab.

== General elections 2024 ==
Provincial election 2024: PP-184 Kasur-X
Party	Candidate	Votes	%	±%
PML(N)	Rana Muhammad Iqbal Khan	44,378	39.09	
Independent	Rana Muhammad Aslam Khan	29,697	26.16	
Independent	Rana Tanveer Riaz Khan	23,961	21.10	
TLP	Ali Hussain Khan	8,649	7.62	
Others	Others (fifteen candidates)	6,854	6.03	
Turnout		117,199	54.90	
Total valid votes		113,539	96.88	
Rejected ballots		3,660	3.12	
Majority		14,681	12.93	
Registered electors		213,476		
hold				

== General elections 2018 ==
Provincial election 2018: PP-181 Kasur-VIII
Party	Candidate	Votes	%	±%
PML(N)	Rana Muhammad Iqbal Khan	44,600	38.88	
PTI	Rana Muhammad Aslam Khan	41,524	36.20	
TLP	Rana Naeem Riaz Ahmed	12,776	11.14	
Independent	Rana Muhammad Nadeem Aslam	2,539	2.21	
Independent	Rana Javed Iqbal Khan	2,444	2.13	
AAT	Muhammad Asif	2,395	2.09	
PPP	Hamayun Majeed	2,107	1.84	
Independent	Rana Sarfraz Ahmed Khan	1,988	1.73	
MMA	Sardar Noor Ahmad	1,162	1.01	
Independent	Hashmat Ali Khan	1,140	0.99	
Others	Others (nine candidates)	2,042	1.80	
Turnout		118,275	61.04	
Total valid votes		114,717	96.99	
Rejected ballots		3,558	3.01	
Majority		3,076	2.68	
Registered electors		193,779		

== General elections 2013 ==
Provincial election 2013: PP-184 Kasur-X
Party	Candidate	Votes	%	±%
PML(N)	Rana Muhammad Iqbal Khan	41,772	47.35	
PTI	Rana Muhammad Aslam Khan	25,198	28.56	
PML(Q)	Muhammad Mumtaz Khalid	19,462	22.06	
JI	Sardar Noor Ahmad	1,252	1.42	
Others	Others (nine candidates)	533	0.60	
Turnout		91,492	63.14	
Total valid votes		88,217	96.42	
Rejected ballots		3,275	3.58	
Majority		16,574	18.79	
Registered electors		144,909		

== General elections 2008 ==
Contesting candidates	Party affiliation	Votes polled

== See also ==
- PP-183 Kasur-IX
- PP-185 Okara-I
