= Rana Abdul Shakoor Khan =

Deputy Attorney-General-I Attorney-General for Pakistan
- Incumbent
- Assumed office 1 December 2018
- Constituency: ؒLahore
- In office 2008 – 31 May 2018
- Constituency: NA-141 (Kasur-IV)

Personal details
- Born: 6 August 1956 (age 69) Chunian

Rana Abdul Shakoor Khan (Urdu: رانا عبد الشکورخان; born 8 June 1956) is a Pakistani lawyer Deputy Attorney-General-I Lahore.

== Early life ==
He was born on 9 June 1956. He is a Pakistani lawyer Deputy Attorney-General-I Lahore.

== Political career ==
He ran for the seat of the National Assembly of Pakistan as a candidate of Pakistan Peoples Party Parliamentarians (PPP) from Constituency NA-141 (Kasur-IV) in the 2008 Pakistani general election but was unsuccessful. He received 20,084 votes and lost the seat to Rana Muhammad Ishaq.
