= Makhdoom Syed Sami Ul Hassan Gillani =

Pakistani politician

Member of the National Assembly of Pakistan
- Incumbent
- Assumed office 29 February 2024
- Constituency: NA-166 Bahawalpur-III
- In office 13 August 2018 – 10 August 2023
- Constituency: NA-174 (Bahawalpur-V)

Tehsil Nazim of Ahmedpur East
- In office 2001–2009

Personal details
- Born: Bahawalpur, Punjab, Pakistan
- Party: IPP (2026-present)
- Other political affiliations: PMLN (2023-2026); PTI (2018-2023); BNAP (2013-2018); PML(Q) (2001-2013)

Makhdoom Syed Sami Ul Hassan Gillani (Urdu: مخدوم سید سمیع الحسن گیلانی) is a Pakistani politician who has been a member of the National Assembly of Pakistan since February 2024 and previously served in this position from August 2018 till August 2023. He also served as the Tehsil Nazim of Ahmedpur East from 2000 to 2008.

== Political career ==
He served as the Tehsil Nazim of Ahmedpur East from 2000 to 2005 and then from 2005 to 2008, resigning in the middle of his term in order to contest the coming elections.

He contested the 2008 Pakistani general election from NA-183 Bahawalpur-I as a candidate of Pakistan Muslim League (Q) but was unsuccessful. He received 39,644 votes and was defeated by Arif Aziz Sheikh, a candidate of Pakistan People's Party (PPP).

He contested the 2013 Pakistani general election from NA-183 Bahawalpur-I as a candidate of Bahawalpur National Awami Party (BNAP), but was unsuccessful. He received 47,362 votes and was defeated by Syed Ali Hassan Gilani, a candidate of Pakistan Muslim League (N) (PML(N)).

He was elected to the National Assembly of Pakistan from NA-174 (Bahawalpur-V) as a candidate of Pakistan Tehreek-e-Insaf (PTI) in the 2018 Pakistani general election. He received 63,975 votes and defeated Bahawal Abbas Abbasi, an independent candidate.

He was re-elected to the National Assembly from NA-166 Bahawalpur-III as a candidate of PML(N) in the 2024 Pakistani general election. He received 34,407 votes and defeated Kanwal Shauzab, an Independent politician (PTI) Supported Pakistan Tehreek-e-Insaf, candidate.

== More Reading ==
- List of members of the 15th National Assembly of Pakistan
