= NA-142 =

NA-142 may refer to:

- NA-142 (Okara-II), a constituency for the National Assembly of Pakistan
- NA-142 (Kasur-V), a former constituency for the National Assembly of Pakistan
