= Mian Ghous Muhammad =

Member of the National Assembly of Pakistan from Rahim Yar Khan (2024–2029)

- میاں غوث محمد

Member of the National Assembly of Pakistan
- Incumbent
- Assumed office 29 February 2024
- Constituency: NA-170 Rahim Yar Khan-II

Personal details
- Party: PTI (2018-present)

Mian Ghous Muhammad (Urdu: میاں غوث محمد) is a Pakistani politician who has been a member of the National Assembly of Pakistan since February 2024.

== Political career ==
Muhammad contested the 2008 Pakistani general election from NA-193 Rahim Yar Khan-II as an independent candidate, but was unsuccessful. He received 252 votes and was defeated by Mian Abdul Sattar, a candidate of Pakistan People's Party (PPP).

He contested the 2013 Pakistani general election from NA-193 Rahim Yar Khan-II as a candidate of Pakistan Tehreek-e-Insaf (PTI), but was unsuccessful. He received 17,130 votes and was defeated by Sheikh Fayyaz Ud Din, a candidate of Pakistan Muslim League (N) (PML(N)).

He contested the 2018 Pakistani general election from NA-176 Rahim Yar Khan-II as a candidate of PTI, but was unsuccessful. He received 59,937 votes and was defeated by Sheikh Fayyaz Ud Din, a candidate of PML(N).

He was elected to the National Assembly of Pakistan in the 2024 Pakistani general election from NA-170 Rahim Yar Khan-II as an independent candidate supported by PTI. He received 113,336 votes while runner-up Sheikh Fayyaz Ud Din, a candidate of PML(N), received 79,144 votes.
