= Malik Rasheed Ahmed Khan =

Pakistani politician

- ملک رشید احمد خان

Member of the National Assembly of Pakistan
- Incumbent
- Assumed office 29 April 2024
- Constituency: NA-132 Kasur-II
- In office 13 August 2018 – 10 August 2023
- Constituency: NA-138 (Kasur-II)
- In office 14 March 2012 – 31 May 2018
- Constituency: NA-140 (Kasur-III)

Personal details
- Born: 6 November 1949 (age 77) Kasur, Punjab, Pakistan
- Party: PMLN (2012-present)

Malik Rasheed Ahmed Khan (Urdu: ملک رشید احمد خان; born 6 November 1949) is a Pakistani politician who has been a member of the National Assembly of Pakistan since April 2024 and previously served in this position from August 2018 till August 2023 and from February 2012 to May 2018.

== Early life ==
He was born on 6 November 1949 in Kasur into a Rajpoot family.

== Political career ==
He was elected to the National Assembly of Pakistan as an independent candidate from Constituency NA-140 (Kasur-III) in by-polls held in February 2012. He received 42,295 votes and defeated an independent candidate, Azeemuddin Zahid Lakhvi.

He was re-elected to the National Assembly as a candidate of Pakistan Muslim League (N) (PML-N) from Constituency NA-140 (Kasur-III) in the 2013 Pakistani general election. He received 69,212 votes and Azeem u Deen Zahid, a candidate of Pakistan Muslim League (Q) (PML-Q).

He was re-elected to the National Assembly as a candidate of PML-N from NA-138 (Kasur-II) in the 2018 Pakistani general election.

He was re-elected to the National Assembly as a candidate of PML-N from NA-132 Kasur-II in the 2024 Pakistani by-elections.
