= NA-141 =

Constituency NA-141 may refer to:

- NA-141 (Okara-I), a constituency of the National Assembly of Pakistan
- NA-141 (Kasur-IV), a former constituency of the National Assembly of Pakistan
