= Arif Aziz Sheikh =

Pakistani politician

Member of the National Assembly of Pakistan
- In office 2008–2013
- Constituency: NA-183 (Bahawalpur-I)

Arif Aziz Sheikh is a Pakistani politician who had been a member of the National Assembly of Pakistan from 2008 to 2013.

== Political career ==
He was elected to the National Assembly of Pakistan from Constituency NA-183 (Bahawalpur-I) as a candidate of Pakistan Peoples Party (PPP) in the 2008 Pakistani general election. He received 71,394 votes and defeated Syed Sami-ul-Hassan Gilani, a candidate of Pakistan Muslim League (Q) (PML-Q).

He ran for the seat of the National Assembly as a candidate for PPP from Constituency NA-183 (Bahawalpur-I) in the 2013 Pakistani general election but was unsuccessful. He received 61,891 votes and lost the seat to Syed Ali Hassan Gilani.
