= Mian Muhammad Shoaib Awaisi =

Pakistani politician

Member of the Provincial Assembly of the Punjab
- In office 15 August 2018 – 14 January 2023
- Constituency: PP-252 (Bahawalpur-VIII)
- In office 29 May 2013 – 31 May 2018
- Constituency: PP-270 (Bahawalpur-IV)

Personal details
- Born: 6 August 1971 (age 55) Bahawalpur, Punjab, Pakistan
- Party: PMLN (2013-present)
- Relations: Najibuddin Awaisi (uncle); Usman Awaisi (cousin)
- Parent: Mian Shahab-ud-Din Awaisi (father)

Mian Muhammad Shoaib Awaisi is a Pakistani politician who was a Member of the Provincial Assembly of the Punjab, from May 2013 to May 2018 and again from August 2018 till January 2023.

== Early life and education ==
He was born on 6 August 1971 in Bahawalpur.

He has received intermediate level education from Govt. Sadiq Egerton College Bahawalpur.

== Political career ==
He was elected to the Provincial Assembly of the Punjab as a candidate of Pakistan Muslim League (Nawaz) (PML-N) from Constituency PP-270 (Bahawalpur-IV) in the 2013 Pakistani general election.

He was re-elected to Provincial Assembly of the Punjab as a candidate of PML-N from Constituency PP-252 (Bahawalpur-VIII) in the 2018 Pakistani general election.
