= Muhammad Jamil Malik =

Muhammad Jamil Malik محمد جمیل ملک

Member of the National Assembly of Pakistan

Personal details
- Party: Pakistan Muslim League (N)

Muhammad Jamil Malik (Urdu: محمد جمیل ملک) is a Pakistani politician affiliated with the Pakistan Muslim League (N) who served as a member of the National Assembly of Pakistan. His constituency is Gujrat-IV. In June 2012, his national assembly membership was suspended by the Supreme Court of Pakistan because he reportedly possessed dual nationality of the Netherlands.
