= Sardar Talib Hassan Nakai =

Pakistani politician

Member of the National Assembly of Pakistan
- In office 13 August 2018 – 10 August 2023
- Constituency: NA-140 (Kasur-IV)
- In office January 2003 – May 2013
- Constituency: NA-142 (Kasur-V)

Personal details
- Party: Independent (2025-present)
- Other political affiliations: PTI (2018-2023); PML(Q) (2002-2018); PML(J) (1993-2002); IJI (1988-1993)

Sardar Talib Hassan Nakai is a Pakistani politician who had been a member of the National Assembly of Pakistan from August 2018 till August 2023. He was previously a member of the National Assembly from January 2003 to 2013. He studied at Aitchison College and Forman Christian College.

== Political career ==
He was elected to the National Assembly of Pakistan from NA-108 Kasur-III as a candidate of Islami Jamhoori Ittehad (IJI) in the 1988 Pakistani general election. He received 54,479 votes and defeated Malik Ashiq Hussain, a candidate of Pakistan People's Party (PPP).

He ran for the National Assembly from NA-108 Kasur-III as a candidate of IJI in the 1990 Pakistani general election, but was unsuccessful. He received 41,554 votes and was defeated by Rana Muhammad Hayat, an independent candidate.

He was elected to the National Assembly from NA-108 Kasur-III as a candidate of Pakistan Muslim League (J) (PML(J)) in the 1993 Pakistani general election. He received 62,598 votes and defeated Rana Muhammad Hayat, a candidate of Pakistan Muslim League (N) (PML(N)).

He ran for the National Assembly from NA-108 Kasur-III as a candidate of PML(J) in the 1997 Pakistani general election, but was unsuccessful. He received 32,160 votes and was defeated by Rana Muhammad Hayat, a candidate of PML(N).

He was elected to the National Assembly of Pakistan from Constituency NA-142 (Kasur-V) as a candidate of Pakistan Muslim League (Q) (PML-Q) in by-polls held in January 2003. He received 48,935 votes and defeated Rana Muhammad Hayat, a candidate of PML(N).

He was re-elected to the National Assembly from Constituency NA-142 (Kasur-V) as a candidate of PML-Q in 2008 Pakistani general election. He received 47,192 votes and defeated Rana Muhammad Hayat, a candidate of PML(N).

He ran for the National Assembly seat from Constituency NA-142 (Kasur-V) as a candidate of PML-Q in 2013 Pakistani general election. He received 65,758 votes, losing to Rana Muhammad Hayat, a candidate of PML(N).

He was re-elected to the National Assembly as a candidate of Pakistan Tehreek-e-Insaf (PTI) from NA-140 (Kasur-IV) in 2018 Pakistani general election and defeated Rana Muhammad Hayat, a candidate of PML(N).

== More Reading ==
- List of members of the 15th National Assembly of Pakistan
