= NA-132 Kasur-II =

Constituency of the National Assembly of Pakistan

- Constituency for the National Assembly of Pakistan
- Region: Kot Radha Kishan Tehsil and Kasur Tehsil Tehsil (partly) of Kasur District
- Electorate: 526,156

Current constituency
- Party: Pakistan Muslim League (N)
- Member: Malik Rasheed Ahmed Khan
- Created from: NA-139 Kasur-II; NA-140 Kasur-III

NA-132 Kasur-II (این اے-132، قصور-۲) is a constituency for the National Assembly of Pakistan.

== Members of Parliament ==
=== 2018–2023: NA-138 Kasur-II ===
Election	Member	Party
2018	Malik Rasheed Ahmed Khan	PML(N)

=== 2024–present: NA-132 Kasur-II ===
Election	Member	Party
2024	Shehbaz Sharif	PML (N)
By-election 2024	Malik Rasheed Ahmed Khan	PML (N)

== Election 2002 ==
General elections were held on 10 October 2002. Chaudhry Manzoor Ahmad of PPP won by 28,732 votes.

General election 2002: NA-139 Kasur-II
Party	Candidate	Votes	%	±%
PPP	Ch. Manzoor Ahmad	28,732	28.70	
Independent	Syeda Nelofar Qasim Mehdi	25,137	25.10	
PML(N)	Waseem Akhtar Shaikh	25,007	24.98	
PML(Q)	Mian Khursheed Mehmood Kasuri	16,881	16.86	
Others	Others (seven candidates)	4,373	3.36	
Turnout		103,188	38.75	
Total valid votes		100,130	97.04	
Rejected ballots		3,058	2.96	
Majority		3,595	3.60	
Registered electors		266,294		

== Election 2008 ==
General elections were held on 18 February 2008. Wasim Akhtar Sheikh of PML-N won by 51,436 votes.

General election 2008: NA-139 Kasur-II
Party	Candidate	Votes	%	±%
PML(N)	Waseem Akhtar Shaikh	51,436	43.70	
PPP	Ch. Manzoor Ahmad	44,002	37.38	
PML(Q)	Niloufer Qasim Mahdi	21,012	17.85	
Others	Others (four candidates)	1,259	1.07	
Turnout		121,372	50.68	
Total valid votes		117,709	96.98	
Rejected ballots		3,663	3.02	
Majority		7,434	6.32	
Registered electors		239,473		
PML(N) gain from PPP				

== Election 2013 ==
General elections were held on 11 May 2013. Waseem Akhtar Shaikh of PML-N won by 102,565 votes and became the member of National Assembly.

General election 2013: NA-139 Kasur-II
Party	Candidate	Votes	%	±%
PML(N)	Waseem Akhtar Shaikh	102,565	56.05	
PPP	Ch. Manzoor Ahmad	28,594	15.63	
PTI	Sardar Muhammad Hussain Dogar	21,725	11.87	
Independent	Naveed Hashim Rizvi	14,954	8.17	
Others	Others (thirteen candidates)	15,150	8.28	
Turnout		188,722	62.59	
Total valid votes		182,988	96.96	
Rejected ballots		5,734	3.04	
Majority		73,971	40.42	
Registered electors		301,506		
PML(N) hold				

== Election 2018 ==
General elections were held on 25 July 2018.

General election 2018: NA-138 Kasur-II
Party	Candidate	Votes	%	±%
PML(N)	Malik Rasheed Ahmed Khan	109,785	42.36	
PTI	Rashid Tufail	78,458	30.27	
Independent	Daood Anees Qureshi	18,450	7.11	
PPP	Imran Ali Khan Malik	16,490	6.35	
TLP	Sardar Liaquat Ali Dogar	15,086	5.81	
MMA	Ibtisam Ilahi Zahir	12,074	4.65	
Others	Others (eight candidates)	9,148	3.45	
Turnout		266,748	62.38	
Total valid votes		259,091	97.13	
Rejected ballots		7,657	2.87	
Majority		31,327	12.09	
Registered electors		427,605		
PML(N) hold		Swing	N/A	

== Election 2024 ==
General elections were held on 8 February 2024. Shehbaz Sharif won the election with 137,234 votes, but vacated the seat in favour of NA-123 Lahore-VII.

General election 2024: NA-132 Kasur-II
Party	Candidate	Votes	%	±%
PML(N)	Shehbaz Sharif	137,234	46.08	▲3.72
PTI	Sardar Muhammad Hussain Dogar (Note: Filed nomination papers as PTI candidate but ECP allowed him to run as an Independent)	111,128	37.32	▲7.05
TLP	Faqeer Hussain	22,245	7.47	
Others	Others (nineteen candidates)	27,191	9.13	
Turnout		303,894	57.76	▼4.62
Total valid votes		297,798	97.99	
Rejected ballots		6,096	2.01	
Majority		26,106	8.77	▼3.32
Registered electors		526,156		
PML(N) hold		Swing	N/A	

== By-election 2024 ==
A by-election was held on 21 April 2024.

2024 Pakistani by-elections: NA-132 Kasur-II
Party	Candidate	Votes	%	±%
PML(N)	Malik Rasheed Ahmed Khan	146,849	60.86	▲14.78
PTI	Sardar Muhammad Hussain Dogar	90,980	37.71	
Others	Others (eight candidates)	3,455	1.43	
Turnout		243,917	45.80	▼11.96
Total valid votes		241,284	98.92	
Rejected ballots		2,633	1.08	
Majority		55,869	23.15	▲14.38
Registered electors		532,587		
PML(N) hold				

== See also ==
- NA-131 Kasur-I
- NA-133 Kasur-III
