= Kanwal Shauzab =

Politician in Pakistan

- کنول شوزب

Federal Parliamentary Secretary for Planning, Development and Special Initiatives
- In office 7 September 2018 – 10 April 2022
- Prime Minister: Imran Khan

Member of the National Assembly of Pakistan
- In office 13 August 2018 – 10 April 2022
- Constituency: Reserved seat for women

President of PTI, Women Wing
- In office May 2022 – May 2026

Personal details
- Born: 1977 (age 48–49) Bahawalpur, Punjab, Pakistan
- Party: AP (2026-present)
- Other political affiliations: PTI (1997-2026)

Kanwal Shauzab (Urdu: کنول شوزب) is a Pakistani politician who had been a member of the National Assembly of Pakistan from August 2018 to April 2022 on reserved seat. She joined the Pakistan Tehreek-e-Insaf (PTI) in 1997 and is currently the party’s women wing president.

== Early life and education ==
She was born in 1977 to a Pakistan Army officer and is from Bahawalpur District in Punjab, Pakistan.

She holds a master's degree from the National University of Modern Languages in English Literature and M.Phil from the Quaid-i-Azam University, which she completed in 2015.

== Political career ==
She joined Pakistan Tehreek-e-Insaf (PTI) in 1997.

She ran for the Senate of Pakistan in 2018 on a PTI ticket but was unsuccessful. She was elected to the National Assembly of Pakistan as a candidate of PTI on a reserved seat for women from Punjab in the 2018 Pakistani general election.

On 7 September 2018, she was appointed as Parliamentary Secretary for Planning, Development, and Reforms.

In April 2022, she resigned from the National Assembly seat along with all PTI members following the No-confidence motion against Imran Khan. She was appointed as the President of PTI’s Women Wing in May 2022 by Imran Khan.

In February 2024, she contested the general election as a PTI backed independent candidate from NA-166 Bahawalpur-III but lost to Makhdoom Syed Sami ul Hassan Gillani of the PML-N. She was a PTI candidate for reserved seats allocation for women following the Reserved seats case.

== Allegations of abuse of power and torture ==
In September 2020, a citizen of Islamabad Sector F-11/2 petitioned the Islamabad Sessions Court to request registration of a criminal complaint against Shauzab. The petition alleged that Shauzab used Capital Development Authority to landscape and clean up an area around Shauzab's newly-purchased house; and that on 30 September 2020, she trespassed on private property to torture a 67-year-old neighbor.

Additional Session Judge Syed Faizan Haider approved the petition on 19 January 2021, and ordered that the appropriate police FIR be registered against the PTI Member National Assembly (MNA) according to the law.

== See also ==
- List of members of the 15th National Assembly of Pakistan
- List of Pakistan Tehreek-e-Insaf elected members (2013–2018)
- No-confidence motion against Imran Khan
