= NA-167 Bahawalpur-IV =

Constituency of the National Assembly of Pakistan

- Constituency for the National Assembly of Pakistan
- Region: Ahmadpur East Tehsil (partly) and Bahawalpur Saddar Tehsil (partly) including Samma Satta of Bahawalpur District
- Electorate: 463,878

Current constituency
- Party: Pakistan Muslim League (N)
- Member: Usman Owaisi
- Created from: NA-184 Bahawalpur-II

NA-167 Bahawalpur-IV (این اے-167، بہاولپور-4) is a constituency for the National Assembly of Pakistan.

== Members of Parliament ==
=== 2018–2023: NA-173 Bahawalpur-IV ===
Election	Member	Party
2018	Najibuddin Awaisi	PML(N)

=== 2024–present: NA-167 Bahawalpur-IV ===
Election	Member	Party
2024	Usman Owaisi	PML(N)

== Election 2002 ==
General elections were held on 10 October 2002. Aamir Yar Malik of PPP won by 80,902 votes.

General election 2002: NA-184 Bahawalpur-II
Party	Candidate	Votes	%	±%
PPP	Aamir Yar Malik	69,902	60.88	
PML(Q)	Muhammad Safdar Abbasi	43,874	38.28	
Others	Others (two candidates)	1,042	0.84	
Turnout		116,847	42.10	
Total valid votes		114,818	98.26	
Rejected ballots		2,029	1.74	
Majority		26,028	22.60	
Registered electors		277,578		

== Election 2008 ==
General elections were held on 18 February 2008. Malik Aamir Yar Waran an independent candidate won by 59,277 votes.

General election 2008: NA-184 Bahawalpur-II
Party	Candidate	Votes	%	±%
Independent	Malik Aamir Yar Warn	59,277	44.69	
PML(Q)	Mian Najeeb Ud Din Awasi	38,407	28.96	
PPP	Muhammad Yousuf Ali Ghallu	22,150	16.70	
Independent	Sahibzada Muhammad Gazain Abbasi	6,974	5.26	
Others	Others (six candidates)	5,823	4.39	
Turnout		137,879	42.88	
Total valid votes		132,631	96.19	
Rejected ballots		5,248	3.81	
Majority		20,870	15.73	
Registered electors		321,581		
Independent gain from PPP				

== By-Election 2010 ==
By-Election 2010: NA-184 Bahawalpur-II
Party	Candidate	Votes	%	±%
PPP	Khadija Aamir Yar Malik	74,754	55.75	
PML(N)	Mian Najeeb-Ud-Din Awasi	48,776	36.38	
Independent	Rao Muhammad Javed Iqbal	6,734	5.02	
Independent	Hafiz Muneer Ahmed Adovate	1,043	0.78	
Others	Others (eight candidates)	2,781	2.07	
Turnout		135,823	42.21	
Total valid votes		134,088	98.72	
Rejected ballots		1,735	1.28	
Majority		25,978	19.37	
Registered electors		321,784		
PPP gain from Independent				

== Election 2013 ==
General elections were held on 11 May 2013. Mian Najeebuddin Awaisi of PML-N won by 94,429 votes and became the member of National Assembly.

General election 2013: NA-184 Bahawalpur-II
Party	Candidate	Votes	%	±%
PML(N)	Mian Najeeb Ud Din Awasi	94,429	55.06	
PPP	Khadeeja Aamir Yar Malik	64,175	37.42	
Others	Others (eleven candidates)	12,883	7.52	
Turnout		176,485	60.52	
Total valid votes		171,487	97.17	
Rejected ballots		4,998	2.83	
Majority		30,254	17.64	
Registered electors		291,600		
PML(N) gain from Independent				

== Election 2018 ==
General elections were held on 25 July 2018.

General election 2018: NA-173 Bahawalpur-IV
Party	Candidate	Votes	%	±%
PML(N)	Najibuddin Awaisi	86,142	41.01	
PTI	Khadija Aamir Yar Malik	60,211	28.67	
PPP	Syed Ali Hassan Gilani	44,892	21.37	
Others	Others (four candidates)	18,804	8.95	
Turnout		218,462	56.02	
Total valid votes		210,049	96.15	
Rejected ballots		8,413	3.85	
Majority		25,931	12.35	
Registered electors		389,937		
PML(N) hold		Swing	N/A	

== Election 2024 ==
General elections were held on 8 February 2024. Usman Awaisi won the election with 88,670 votes.

General election 2024: NA-167 Bahawalpur-IV
Party	Candidate	Votes	%	±%
PML(N)	Usman Awaisi	88,670	37.96	▼3.05
Independent	Aamir Yar Malik	64,037	27.42	
PTI	Mahboob Ahmad (Note: Filed nomination papers as PTI candidate but ECP allowed him to run as an independent)	35,446	15.18	▼13.49
PPP	Shahrukh Malik	23,646	10.12	▼11.25
Others	Others (seven candidates)	21,774	9.32	
Turnout		241,854	52.14	▼3.88
Total valid votes		233,573	96.58	
Rejected ballots		8,281	3.42	
Majority		24,633	10.55	▼1.80
Registered electors		463,878		
PML(N) hold		Swing	N/A	

== See also ==
- NA-166 Bahawalpur-III
- NA-168 Bahawalpur-V
