= Usman Awaisi =

Member of the National Assembly of Pakistan from Bahawalpur (2024–2029)

- عثمان اویسی

Parliamentary Secretary for Railways
- In office 13 September 2024 – 27 February 2025
- Minister: Abid Sher Ali
- Preceded by: Hanif Abbasi

Member of the National Assembly of Pakistan
- Incumbent
- Assumed office 29 February 2024
- Preceded by: Najibuddin Awaisi
- Constituency: NA-167 Bahawalpur-IV

Personal details
- Party: PMLN (2024-present)
- Relations: Mian Muhammad Shoaib Awaisi (cousin)
- Parent: Najibuddin Awaisi (father)

Muhammad Usman Awaisi (Urdu: محمد عثمان اویسی) is a Pakistani politician from the city of Bahawalpur. He has been a member of the National Assembly of Pakistan since February 2024.

== Political career ==
Awaisi was elected to the National Assembly of Pakistan from NA-167 Bahawalpur-IV as a Pakistan Muslim League (N) (PML(N)) candidate in the 2024 Pakistani general election. He received 88,670 votes and defeated an Independent candidate Malik Aamir Yar Waran who received 64,037 votes.

On 13 September 2024, he was inducted into the High-Powered Committee on Rightsizing of the Federal Government. The aim of this committee is to reduce the size of the federal government and cut down on expenditures.

On 13 September 2024, he was appointed as Parliamentary Secretary for Railways.
