= Muhammad Ilyas Chaudhary =

Member of the National Assembly of Pakistan from Gujrat (2024–2029)

- محمد الیاس چوہدری

Member of the National Assembly of Pakistan
- Incumbent
- Assumed office 29 February 2024
- Constituency: NA-62 Gujrat-I

Personal details
- Party: PML(Q) (2024-present)
- Other political affiliations: PTI (2018-2024)

Muhammad Ilyas Chaudhary (Urdu: محمد الیاس چوہدری) is a Pakistani politician who has been a member of the National Assembly of Pakistan since February 2024.

== Political career ==
Chaudhary contested the 2018 Pakistani general election from NA-71 Gujrat-IV as a candidate of Pakistan Tehreek-e-Insaf (PTI), but was unsuccessful. He received 81,428 votes and was defeated by Chaudhry Abid Raza, a candidate of Pakistan Muslim League (N) (PML(N)).

Chaudhary won the 2024 Pakistani general election from NA-62 Gujrat-I as an Independent candidate. He received 63,952 votes while runner-up Chaudhry Abid Raza, a candidate of PML(N), received 43,589 votes.
