= NA-133 Kasur-III =

Pakistan national assembly constituency

- Constituency for the National Assembly of Pakistan
- Region: Chunian Tehsil and Pattoki Tehsil (partly) of Kasur District
- Electorate: 579,328

Current constituency
- Created: 2024
- Party: Sunni Ittehad Council
- Member: Azeemuddin Zahid Lakhvi
- Created from: NA-141 Kasur-IV and NA-142 Kasur-V

NA-133 Kasur-III (این اے-133، قصور-3) is a constituency of the National Assembly of Pakistan, located in Kasur District, Punjab. Created through the 2018 delimitation, it comprises Chunian Tehsil and parts of Pattoki Tehsil, incorporating areas previously within the abolished constituencies of NA-141 Kasur-IV and NA-142 Kasur-V. The predecessor designation under the 2018 delimitation was NA-139 Kasur-III; the current designation NA-133 was assigned following the 2023 delimitation. At the 2024 general election the registered electorate stood at 579,328.

== Area ==
The constituency principally covers Pattoki Tehsil and includes the towns of Phool Nagar and Balloki, which were formerly part of NA-141 Kasur-IV and NA-142 Kasur-V. Several areas of Pattoki Tehsil, namely Chak No. 34, Chakoki and Wan Adhan, fall within the separately designated NA-139 (Kasur-III).

== Members of Parliament ==
=== 2018 to 2023: NA-139 Kasur-III ===
Election	Member	Party
2018	Rana Muhammad Ishaq	PML-N

=== 2024 to present: NA-133 Kasur-III ===
Election	Member	Party
2024	Azeemuddin Zahid Lakhvi	SIC (Note: Filed nomination papers as a PTI candidate but was required by the Election Commission of Pakistan to contest as an independent candidate.)

== 2018 general election ==
General elections were held on 25 July 2018. Rana Muhammad Ishaq of PML-N won the seat under the predecessor designation NA-139 Kasur-III with 121,767 votes.

General election 2018: NA-139 Kasur-III
Party	Candidate	Votes	%	±%
PML(N)	Rana Muhammad Ishaq	121,767	43.89	
PTI	Azeemuddin Zahid Lakhvi	112,893	40.69	
Others	Others (fifteen candidates)	42,788	15.42	
Turnout		286,418	59.99	
Total valid votes		277,448	96.87	
Rejected ballots		8,970	3.13	
Majority		8,874	3.20	
Registered electors		477,465		
PML(N) hold		Swing	N/A	

== 2024 general election ==
General elections were held on 8 February 2024. Azeemuddin Zahid Lakhvi, standing as an independent candidate with PTI affiliation, won the seat with 130,167 votes.

General election 2024: NA-133 Kasur-III
Party	Candidate	Votes	%	±%
PTI	Azeemuddin Zahid Lakhvi	130,167	41.17	▲0.48
PML(N)	Rana Muhammad Ishaq	119,343	37.75	▼6.14
TLP	Ghulam Murtaza	21,950	6.94	▲1.32
Others	Others (fifteen candidates)	44,721	14.14	
Turnout		330,182	56.99	▼3.00
Total valid votes		316,181	95.76	
Rejected ballots		14,001	4.24	
Majority		10,824	3.42	
Registered electors		579,328		
