= Azeemuddin Zahid Lakhvi =

Member of the National Assembly of Pakistan from Kasur (2024–2029)

- عظیم الدین زاہد لکھوی

Member of the National Assembly of Pakistan
- Incumbent
- Assumed office 29 February 2024
- Constituency: NA-133 Kasur-III

Personal details
- Other political affiliations: PTI (2018-Present)

Azeemuddin Zahid Lakhvi (Urdu: عظیم الدین زاہد لکھوی) is a Pakistani politician who has been a member of the National Assembly of Pakistan since February 2024.

== Political career ==
Lakhvi contested the 2018 Pakistani general election from NA-139 Kasur-III as a candidate of the Pakistan Tehreek-e-Insaf (PTI), but was unsuccessful. He received 112,893 votes and was defeated by Rana Muhammad Ishaq, a candidate of Pakistan Muslim League (N) (PML(N)).

He was elected to the National Assembly of Pakistan in the 2024 Pakistani general election from NA-133 Kasur-III as an Independent candidate supported by PTI. He received 130,167 votes while runner up Rana Muhammad Ishaq of PML(N) received 119,343 votes.
