= Javed Iqbal Warraich =

Pakistani politician

- جاوید اقبال وڑائچ

Member of the National Assembly of Pakistan
- Incumbent
- Assumed office 29 February 2024
- Constituency: NA-172 Rahim Yar Khan-IV
- In office 13 August 2018 – 25 January 2023
- Constituency: NA-179 (Rahim Yar Khan-V)
- In office 2008–2013
- Constituency: NA-196 (Rahim Yar Khan-V)

Personal details
- Party: PTI (2018-present)
- Other political affiliations: PPP (2008-2018)

Javed Iqbal Warraich (Urdu: جاوئد اقبال وڑائچ) is a Pakistani politician who has been a member of the National Assembly of Pakistan since February 2024 and previously served in this position from August 2018 till January 2023 and from 2008 to 2013.

== Political career ==
He was elected to the National Assembly of Pakistan from Constituency NA-196 (Rahim Yar Khan-V) as a candidate of Pakistan Peoples Party (PPP) in the 2008 Pakistani general election. He received 52,090 votes and defeated Mian Imtiaz Ahmed, an independent candidate.

He ran for the seat of the National Assembly from Constituency NA-196 (Rahim Yar Khan-V) as a candidate of the PPP in the 2013 Pakistani general election but was unsuccessful. He received 56,187 votes and lost the seat to Mian Imtiaz Ahmed, a candidate of the Pakistan Muslim League (N) (PML(N)).

He was re-elected to the National Assembly as a candidate of Pakistan Tehreek-e-Insaf (PTI) from NA-179 (Rahim Yar Khan-V) in the 2018 Pakistani general election. He received 110,877 votes and defeated Mian Imtiaz Ahmed, a candidate of the PML(N).

He was re-elected to the National Assembly as an independent candidate supported by PTI from NA-172 Rahim Yar Khan-IV in the 2024 Pakistani general election. He received 129,727 votes and defeated Mian Imtiaz Ahmad, a candidate of PML(N).

== See also ==
- List of members of the 15th National Assembly of Pakistan
