= NA-62 Gujrat-I =

Constituency of the National Assembly of Pakistan

- Constituency for the National Assembly of Pakistan
- Region: Sarai Alamgir Tehsil and Kharian Tehsil including Kharian city of Gujrat District
- Electorate: 532,352

Current constituency
- Party: Pakistan Muslim League (Q) (Note: Elected as an independent and joined the Sunni Ittehad Council, but National Assembly records list his party as the PML(Q))
- Member: Muhammad Ilyas Chaudhary
- Created from: NA-107 Gujrat-IV

NA-62 Gujrat-I (این اے-62، گجرات-1) is a constituency for the National Assembly of Pakistan.

== Members of Parliament ==
=== 2018–2023: NA-71 Gujrat-IV ===
Election	Member	Party
2018	Chaudhry Abid Raza	PML(N)

=== 2024–present: NA-62 Gujrat-I ===
Election	Member	Party
2024	Muhammad Ilyas Chaudhary	PML(Q)

== Election 2002 ==
General elections were held on 10 October 2002. Rehman Naseer Chaudhry of PPP won by 52,484 votes.

General election 2002: NA-107 Gujrat-IV
Party	Candidate	Votes	%	±%
PPP	Rehman Naseer Ch.	52,484	33.19	
PML(Q)	Syed Noor UI Hassan Shah	48,673	30.78	
PML(N)	Malik Ajmal Saddique	43,905	27.76	
Independent	Raja Javaid Mujtaba	8,575	5.42	
MMA	Muhammad Nawaz	3,314	2.10	
Others	Others (two candidates)	1,192	0.75	
Turnout		163,542	53.02	
Total valid votes		158,143	96.70	
Rejected ballots		5,399	3.30	
Majority		3,811	2.41	
Registered electors		308,463		

== Election 2008 ==
General elections were held on 18 February 2008. Muhammad Jamil Malik of PML-N won by 75,205 votes.

General election 2008: NA-107 Gujrat-IV
Party	Candidate	Votes	%	±%
PML(N)	Muhammad Jamil Malik	75,205	45.98	
PML(Q)	Rehman Naseer Ch.	69,101	42.25	
PPP	Raja Masood Ahmad	14,948	9.14	
Others	Others (four candidates)	4,298	2.63	
Turnout		169,727	52.82	
Total valid votes		163,552	96.36	
Rejected ballots		6,175	3.64	
Majority		6,104	3.73	
Registered electors		321,304		
PML(N) gain from PPP				

== By-Election 2012 ==
By-Election 2012: NA-107 Gujrat-IV
Party	Candidate	Votes	%	±%
PML(N)	Muhammad Hanif Malik	104,382	57.40	
PML(Q)	Rehman Naseer Ch.	74,062	40.73	
Others	Others (nine candidates)	3,398	1.87	
Turnout		183,861	45.64	
Total valid votes		181,842	98.90	
Rejected ballots		2,019	1.10	
Majority		30,320	16.67	
Registered electors		402,898		
PML(N) hold				

== Election 2013 ==
General elections were held on 11 May 2013. Chaudhry Abid Raza of PML-N won by 94,196 votes and became the member of National Assembly.

General election 2013: NA-107 Gujrat-IV
Party	Candidate	Votes	%	±%
PML(N)	Ch. Abid Raza	94,196	45.47	
PTI	Muhammad Ilyes Ch	61,083	29.49	
PML(Q)	Rehman Naseer Ch.	47,406	22.88	
Others	Others (sixteen candidates)	4,482	2.16	
Turnout		211,552	52.81	
Total valid votes		207,167	97.93	
Rejected ballots		4,385	2.07	
Majority		33,113	15.98	
Registered electors		400,622		
PML(N) hold				

== Election 2018 ==
General elections were held on 25 July 2018.

General election 2018: NA-71 Gujrat-IV
Party	Candidate	Votes	%	±%
PML(N)	Chaudhry Abid Raza	88,580	35.00	
PTI	Muhammad Ilyas Chaudhary	81,438	32.18	
Independent	Muhammad Hanif Malik	36,889	14.57	
TLP	Naeem Ahmed	29,627	11.71	
Others	Others (ten candidates)	10,309	4.07	
Turnout		253,100	50.87	
Rejected ballots		6,244	2.47	
Majority		7,142	2.82	
Registered electors		497,500		
PML(N) hold		Swing	N/A	

== Election 2024 ==
General elections were held on 8 February 2024. Muhammad Ilyas Chaudhary won the election with 97,436 votes.

General election 2024: NA-62 Gujrat-I
Party	Candidate	Votes	%	±%
PTI	Muhammad Ilyas Chaudhary (Note: Filed nomination papers as PTI candidate but ECP allowed him to run as an Independent)	97,436	42.58	▲10.40
PML(N)	Chaudhry Abid Raza	71,154	31.10	▼4.90
PML(Q)	Chaudhry Musa Elahi	26,797	11.71	N/A
TLP	Syed Shamim Raza	24,035	10.50	▼1.21
Others	Others (twenty-two candidates)	9,383	4.10	
Turnout		234,151	43.97	▼6.90
Total valid votes		228,805	97.68	
Rejected ballots		5,346	2.32	
Majority		26,282	11.49	
Registered electors		532,532		

== See also ==
- NA-61 Jhelum-II
- NA-63 Gujrat-II
