= Khizer Hussain Mazari =

Pakistani politician

Khizer Hussain Mazari is a Pakistani politician who has been a Member of the Provincial Assembly of the Punjab since 2024.

== Political career ==
He was elected to the Provincial Assembly of the Punjab as an Pakistan Muslim League (N) candidate from constituency PP-297 Rajanpur-VI in the 2024 Pakistani general election.
