= PP-182 Kasur-VIII =

Constituency of the Provincial Assembly of Punjab, Pakistan

- Constituency for the Provincial Assembly of Punjab
- Region: Chunian Tehsil (partly) and Pattoki Tehsil (partly) including Pattoki city of Kasur District

Current constituency
- Created from: PP-182 Kasur-VIII (2002-2018); PP-179 Kasur-VI (2018-2023)

PP-182 Kasur-VIII (پی پی-182، قصور-8) is a Constituency of Provincial Assembly of Punjab.

== General elections 2024 ==
Provincial election 2024: PP-182 Kasur-VIII
Party	Candidate	Votes	%	±%
PML(N)	Mahmood Anwar	32,352	25.96	
Independent	Akeel Aslam (Note: Filed nomination papers as PTI candidate but ECP allowed him to run as an Independent)	31,447	25.23	
Independent	Rana Mumtaz Ali Khan	17,409	13.97	
Independent	Malik Mukhtar Ahmad	11,921	9.56	
TLP	Shahid Imran	11,348	9.10	
Independent	Muhammad Rizwan	6,373	5.11	
Independent	Jahangir Ali	4,188	3.36	
Independent	Qasim Ishaq	2,813	2.26	
Others	Others (fifteen candidates)	6,797	5.45	
Turnout		129,291	52.78	
Total valid votes		124,648	96.41	
Rejected ballots		4,643	3.59	
Majority		905	0.73	
Registered electors		244,949		
hold				

== General elections 2018 ==
Provincial election 2018: PP-179 Kasur-VI
Party	Candidate	Votes	%	±%
PTI	Malik Mukhtar Ahmad	29,330	23.66	
PML(N)	Mehmood Anwar	25,621	20.67	
Independent	Rana Mumtaz Ali Khan	22,327	18.01	
AAT	Jehangir Ali	11,337	9.14	
TLP	ijaz Ahmad	11,335	9.14	
PPP	Amjad Ali Meo	10,907	8.80	
Independent	Muhammad Ahsan	8,662	6.99	
Independent	Muhammad Faisal	1,796	1.45	
Others	Others (fourteen candidates)	2,668	2.14	
Turnout		127,855	59.62	
Total valid votes		123,983	96.97	
Rejected ballots		3,872	3.03	
Majority		3,709	2.99	
Registered electors		214,455		

== General elections 2013 ==
Provincial election 2013: PP-182 Kasur-VIII
Party	Candidate	Votes	%	±%
PML(N)	Mehmood Anwar	32,553	33.26	
Independent	Malik Mukhtar Ahmed	19,477	19.90	
Independent	Rana Mumtaz	17,365	17.74	
Independent	Ijaz Ahmad	10,342	10.57	
PPP	Amjad Ali Mayo	7,467	7.63	
PTI	Syed Tayyab Mehmood Jafri	6,814	6.96	
Independent	Riaz Hussain	1,488	1.52	
Others	Others (fourteen candidates)	2,370	2.42	
Turnout		98,288	60.14	
Total valid votes		97,876	99.58	
Rejected ballots		412	0.42	
Majority		13,076	13.36	
Registered electors		163,427		

== General elections 2008 ==
Contesting candidates	Party affiliation	Votes polled

== See also ==
- PP-181 Kasur-VII
- PP-183 Kasur-IX
