= Mian Abdul Sattar =

Pakistani politician

Member of the National Assembly of Pakistan
- In office 2008–2013
- Constituency: NA-193 (Rahim Yar Khan-II)

Mian Abdul Sattar is a Pakistani politician who had been a member of the National Assembly of Pakistan from 2008 to 2013.

== Political career ==
He was elected to the National Assembly of Pakistan from Constituency NA-193 (Rahim Yar Khan-II) as a candidate of Pakistan Peoples Party (PPP) in 2008 Pakistani general election. He received 58,572 votes and defeated Sheikh Muhammad Anwar, a candidate of Pakistan Muslim League (Q) (PML-Q).

He ran for the seat of the National Assembly from Constituency NA-193 (Rahim Yar Khan-II) as an independent candidate in 2013 Pakistani general election, but was unsuccessful. He received 51 votes and lost the seat to Sheikh Fayyaz Ud Din.
