= NA-134 Kasur-IV =

Pakistani national assembly constituency

- Constituency for the National Assembly of Pakistan
- Region: Chunian Tehsil and Pattoki Tehsil (partly) of Kasur District
- Electorate: 573,778

Current constituency
- Created: 2024
- Party: Pakistan Muslim League (N)
- Member: Rana Muhammad Hayat
- Created from: NA-140 Kasur-III and NA-141 Kasur-IV

NA-134 Kasur-IV (این اے-134، قصور-4) is a constituency of the National Assembly of Pakistan, located in Kasur District, Punjab. Created through the 2018 delimitation, it principally covers Chunian Tehsil and incorporates parts of Pattoki Tehsil, including the Qanungo Halkas of Chak No. 34, Chakoki and Wan Adhan, drawn from the now-abolished NA-140 Kasur-III. The predecessor designation under the 2018 delimitation was NA-140 Kasur-IV; the current designation NA-134 was assigned following the 2023 delimitation. At the 2024 general election the registered electorate stood at 573,778.

== Members of Parliament ==
=== 2018 to 2023: NA-140 Kasur-IV ===
Election	Member	Party
2018	Sardar Talib Hassan Nakai	PTI

=== 2024 to present: NA-134 Kasur-IV ===
Election	Member	Party
2024	Rana Muhammad Hayat	PML-N

== 2018 general election ==
General elections were held on 25 July 2018. Sardar Talib Hassan Nakai of PTI won the seat under the predecessor designation NA-140 Kasur-IV with 124,644 votes, defeating Rana Muhammad Hayat of PML-N by a margin of 249 votes.

General election 2018: NA-140 Kasur-IV
Party	Candidate	Votes	%	±%
PTI	Sardar Talib Hassan Nakai	124,644	44.19	
PML(N)	Rana Muhammad Hayat	124,395	44.11	
Others	Others (ten candidates)	32,975	11.70	
Turnout		289,434	60.65	
Total valid votes		281,981	97.42	
Rejected ballots		7,453	2.58	
Majority		249	0.08	
Registered electors		477,211		
PTI win (new seat)				

== 2024 general election ==
General elections were held on 8 February 2024. Rana Muhammad Hayat of PML-N won the seat with 142,322 votes.

General election 2024: NA-134 Kasur-IV
Party	Candidate	Votes	%	±%
PML(N)	Rana Muhammad Hayat	142,322	46.10	▲1.99
PTI	Sidra Faisal (Note: Filed nomination papers as a PTI candidate but was required by the Election Commission of Pakistan to contest as an independent candidate.)	76,887	24.90	▼19.29
Independent	Sardar Ahmad Ayaz Nakai	47,964	15.54	
TLP	Manzoor Elahi	22,392	7.25	▲1.75
Others	Others (nineteen candidates)	19,169	6.21	
Turnout		320,447	55.85	▼4.80
Total valid votes		308,734	96.34	
Rejected ballots		11,713	3.66	
Majority		65,435	21.19	
Registered electors		573,778		
PML(N) gain from PTI				
