= NA-170 Rahim Yar Khan-II =

Constituency of the National Assembly of Pakistan

- Constituency for the National Assembly of Pakistan
- Region: Khanpur Tehsil (partly) including Khanpur city, Cholistan Desert area and Liaquatpur Tehsil (partly) of Rahim Yar Khan District
- Electorate: 509,644

Current constituency
- Party: Sunni Ittehad Council
- Member: Mian Ghous Muhammad
- Created from: NA-193 Rahim Yar Khan-II

NA-170 Rahim Yar Khan-II (این اے-170، رحیم یار خان-۲) is a constituency for the National Assembly of Pakistan.

== Election 2002 ==
General elections were held on 10 October 2002. Major(R) Syed Tanveer Hussain Syed of PPP won by 45,500 votes.

General election 2002: NA-193 Rahim Yar Khan-II
Party	Candidate	Votes	%	±%
PPP	Syed Tanveer Hussain	45,500	39.92	
PML(Q)	Sheikh Muhammad Anwar	41,671	36.56	
PML(N)	Zaib Jafar	23,004	20.18	
PAT	Dr. Muhammad Ilyas Ch.	2,417	2.12	
Others	Others (two candidates)	1,387	1.22	
Turnout		117,584	41.99	
Total valid votes		113,979	96.93	
Rejected ballots		3,605	3.07	
Majority		3,829	3.36	
Registered electors		280,047		

== Election 2008 ==
General elections were held on 18 February 2008. Mian Abdul Sattar of PPP won by 58,572 votes.

General election 2008: NA-193 Rahim Yar Khan-II
Party	Candidate	Votes	%	±%
PPP	Mian Abdus Sattar	58,572	43.49	
PML(Q)	Sheikh Muhammad Anwar	37,021	27.49	
PML(N)	Zaib Jafar	24,831	18.44	
PML(F)	Syed Tanveer Hussain	11,852	8.80	
Others	Others (four candidates)	2,398	1.78	
Turnout		139,118	39.05	
Total valid votes		134,669	96.80	
Rejected ballots		4,449	3.20	
Majority		21,551	16.00	
Registered electors		356,244		
PPP hold				

== Election 2013 ==
General elections were held on 11 May 2013. Sheikh Fayyaz Ud Din of PML-N won by 86,232 votes and became the member of National Assembly.

General election 2013: NA-193 Rahim Yar Khan-II
Party	Candidate	Votes	%	±%
PML(N)	Sheikh Fayyaz Ud Din	86,232	54.22	
PPP	Mian Abdus Sattar	46,190	29.04	
PTI	Mian Ghous Muhammad	17,158	10.79	
Others	Others (thirteen candidates)	9,464	5.95	
Turnout		164,229	56.95	
Total valid votes		159,044	96.84	
Rejected ballots		5,185	3.16	
Majority		40,042	25.18	
Registered electors		288,381		
PML(N) gain from PPP				

== Election 2018 ==
General elections were held on 25 July 2018.

General election 2018: NA-176 Rahim Yar Khan-II
Party	Candidate	Votes	%	±%
PML(N)	Sheikh Fayyaz Ud Din	78,590	37.19	
PTI	Mian Ghous Muhammad	59,937	28.36	
PPP	Syed Tanvir Hussain	39,954	18.91	
Independent	Muhammad Azhar	23,560	11.15	
Independent	Ammad Ud Din	5,020	2.38	
Independent	Hafiz Muhammad Tahir Zeeshan	1,147	0.54	
Independent	Muhammad Ejaz Shafi	979	0.46	
Pakistan Supreme Democratic Party	Chaudry Muhammad Majeed Gill	708	0.34	
Independent	Junaid Riaz	547	0.26	
Independent	Syed Muhammad Abid Shah	348	0.16	
Independent	Chaudry Muhammad Akmal Siddique	333	0.16	
Independent	Mian Abdul Sattar	191	0.09	
Turnout		216,450	54.90	
Total valid votes		211,314	97.63	
Rejected ballots		5,136	2.37	
Majority		18,653	8.83	
Registered electors		394,282		
PML(N) hold				

== Election 2024 ==
General elections were held on 8 February 2024. Mian Ghous Muhammad won the election with 113,336 votes.

General election 2024: NA-170 Rahim Yar Khan-II
Party	Candidate	Votes	%	±%
PTI	Mian Ghous Muhammad (Note: Filed nomination papers as PTI candidate but ECP allowed him to run as an Independent)	113,336	46.37	▲18.01
PML(N)	Sheikh Fayyaz Ud Din	79,144	32.38	▼4.81
PPP	Hamid Saeed Kazmi	35,549	14.54	▼4.37
Others	Others (twelve candidates)	16,352	6.69	
Turnout		250,014	49.06	▼5.84
Total valid votes		244,411	97.76	
Rejected ballots		5,603	2.24	
Majority		34,192	13.99	
Registered electors		509,644		

== See also ==
- NA-169 Rahim Yar Khan-I
- NA-171 Rahim Yar Khan-III
