= Khadija Aamir Yar Malik =

Pakistani politician

Member of the National Assembly of Pakistan
- In office September 2010 – 2013
- Constituency: NA-184 (Bahawalpur-II)

Khadija Aamir Yar Malik is a Pakistani politician who had been a member of the National Assembly of Pakistan from September 2010 to 2013.

== Political career ==
She was elected to the National Assembly of Pakistan from Constituency NA-184 (Bahawalpur-II) as a candidate of Pakistan Peoples Party (PPP) in by-polls held in September 2010. She received 74,754 votes and defeated Najibuddin Awaisi.

She ran for the seat of the National Assembly from Constituency NA-184 (Bahawalpur-II) as a candidate of PPP in the 2013 Pakistani general election, but was unsuccessful. She received 64,175 votes and lost the seat to Najibuddin Awaisi.

She ran for the seat of the National Assembly from Constituency NA-173 (Bahawalpur-IV) as a candidate of Pakistan Tehreek-e-Insaf (PTI) in the 2018 Pakistani general election, but was unsuccessful. She received 60,211 votes and lost the seat to PML-N candidate Najibuddin Awaisi.
