= Imtiaz Ahmad =

Indian sociologist and academic

- Born: Gonda, Uttar Pradesh
- Occupations: Sociologist, Author, Professor

Academic background
- Education: Lucknow University, University of Delhi, University of Chicago

Academic work
- Notable works: Caste and Social Stratification among Muslims in India

Imtiaz Ahmad (1940-2023) was an Indian sociologist, author, and professor known for his pioneering work on caste dynamics within Indian Muslim society. He served as a professor of political sociology at Jawaharlal Nehru University (JNU) in New Delhi for three decades.

== Early life and education ==
Born in Gonda, Uttar Pradesh Ahmad completed his undergraduate and postgraduate studies at Lucknow University, earning a master's degree in social anthropology in 1960. He furthered his research at the University of Delhi and the University of Chicago, where he was a Fulbright Fellow from 1967 to 1968. During his time at Chicago, he developed the foundational ideas for his seminal work on caste among Indian Muslims.

== Career ==
Ahmad began his academic career as a senior research analyst at the Institute of Economic Growth at Delhi University in 1964. He later became a lecturer in sociology at the same institution. After a stint as a visiting professor of anthropology at the University of Missouri, USA, he joined JNU in 1972 as an associate professor in political sociology and was promoted to full professor in 1983. He retired from JNU in 2002.

Throughout his career, Ahmad also held visiting professorships at institutions such as the University of Missouri, the Institute of Higher Studies in Paris, and York University in Canada.

== Contributions and Works ==
Ahmad's research interests encompassed social stratification, communalism, ethnic conflicts, social movements, Islamic transformations, refugees and migrants, child rights, poverty alleviation, and development. His groundbreaking book, Caste and Social Stratification among Muslims in India (1973), challenged the prevailing notion of a monolithic Muslim community by highlighting the existence of caste-like divisions among Indian Muslims. This work opened new avenues for sociological research on Indian Muslim society.

Other publications include Family, Kinship and Marriage among Muslims in India (1976) and Modernisation and Social Change among Muslims in India (1983), which further explored the complexities of Muslim social structures and their evolution in the Indian context.

== Awards and honors ==
Ahmad received the Pandit Jagpal Krishna Gold Medal from Lucknow University in 1960. He was also a Senior Fellow of the Indian Council of Social Sciences, New Delhi.
