= Constituency NA-140 =

Former constituency of the National Assembly of Pakistan

Constituency NA-140 (Kasur-III)
- Former constituency for the National Assembly of Pakistan
- Region: Kasur District

Former constituency
- Created: 2002
- Abolished: 2018
- Replaced by: Constituency NA-138 (Kasur-II); Constituency NA-139 (Kasur-III)

Constituency NA-140 (Kasur-III) (Urdu: این اے-۱۴۰، قصور-۳) was a constituency for the National Assembly of Pakistan. It comprised areas in the Kasur Tehsil and Chunian Tehsil which, according to the 2018 delimitations, have now been included in Constituency NA-138 (Kasur-II) and Constituency NA-139 (Kasur-III) respectively.

== Election 2002 ==
General elections were held on 10 Oct 2002. Khurshid Mahmud Kasuri of PML-Q won by 50,318 votes.

General election 2002: NA-140 Kasur-III
Party	Candidate	Votes	%	±%
PML(Q)	Mian Khursheed Mehmood Kasuri	50,318	42.02	
Independent	Moeen Ud Din Lakhvi	49,399	41.26	
MMA	Mian Mukhtar Anmad	17,229	14.39	
Others	Others (two candidates)	2,795	2.33	
Turnout		123,871	47.05	
Total valid votes		119,741	96.67	
Rejected ballots		4,130	3.33	
Majority		979	0.76	
Registered electors		263,273		

== Election 2008 ==
General elections were held on 18 Feb 2008. Sardar Asif Ahmed Ali of PPP won by 41,626 votes.

General election 2008: NA-140 Kasur-III
Party	Candidate	Votes	%	±%
PPP	Sardar Asif Ahmad Ali	41,626	32.93	
PML(Q)	Mian Khursheed Mehmood Kasuri	32,155	25.44	
PML(N)	Azeem-Ud-Deen Zahid	29,605	23.42	
Independent	Sardar Hassan Akhtar Mokal	20,689	16.37	
Others	Others (five candidates)	2,333	1.84	
Turnout		130,522	56.64	
Total valid votes		126,408	96.85	
Rejected ballots		4,114	3.15	
Majority		9,471	7.49	
Registered electors		230,446		

== By-Election 2012 ==
By-Election 2012: NA-140 Kasur-III
Party	Candidate	Votes	%	±%
Independent	Malik Rasheed Ahmad Khan	47,295	35.50	
Independent	Dr. Azeem-ud-din Zahid Lakhvi	47,206	35.43	
PPP	Sardar Muhammad Sarwar Dogar	30,305	22.75	
Independent	Malik Khuram Saleem Naul	6,143	4.61	
Others	Others (eleven candidates)	2,287	1.71	
Turnout		135,518	63.08	
Total valid votes		133,236	98.32	
Rejected ballots		2,282	1.68	
Majority		89	0.07	
Registered electors		214,852		

== Election 2013 ==
General elections were held on 11 May 2013. Rasheed Ahmed Khan of PML-N won by 69,212 votes and became the member of National Assembly.

General election 2013: NA-140 Kasur-III
Party	Candidate	Votes	%	±%
PML(N)	Rasheed Ahmad Khan	69,212	38.00	
PML(Q)	Azeem-Ud-Deen Zahid	50,488	27.72	
PTI	Mian Khursheed Mehmood Kasuri	30,431	16.71	
Independent	Sardar Asif Ahmad Ali	19,150	10.52	
Independent	Amjad Iqbal	3,868	2.12	
Others	Others (thirteen candidates)	8,978	4.93	
Turnout		187,842	64.42	
Total valid votes		182,127	96.96	
Rejected ballots		5,715	3.04	
Majority		18,724	10.28	
Registered electors		291,601		
