= NA-172 Rahim Yar Khan-IV =

Constituency of the National Assembly of Pakistan

- Constituency for the National Assembly of Pakistan
- Region: Rahim Yar Khan Tehsil (partly) including Rahim Yar Khan City of Rahim Yar Khan District
- Electorate: 510,749

Current constituency
- Party: Sunni Ittehad Council
- Member: Javed Iqbal Warraich
- Created from: NA-196 Rahim Yar Khan-V

NA-172 Rahim Yar Khan-IV (این اے-172، رحیم یار خان-4) is a constituency for the National Assembly of Pakistan. This constituency mainly comprises Rahim Yar Khan City, Kot Samaba, Bindor Qanungo Halqa and some portion of Taranda Sawai Khan.

== Election 2002 ==
General elections were held on 10 October 2002. Chaudhry Zafar Iqbal Warraich of PPP won by 48,896 votes.

General Election 2002: NA-196 Rahim Yar Khan V
Party	Candidate	Votes	%	±%
PPP	Ch. Zaffar Iqbal Warraich	48,896	42.59	
PML(N)	Ch. Muhammad Jafar Iqbal	30,376	26.46	
PML(Q)	Mian Umer Khalid	20,308	17.69	
MMA	Dr. Riaz Ahmad Khan	12,706	11.07	
Others	Others (seven candidates)	2,531	2.19	
Turnout		117,695	45.93	
Total valid votes		114,817	97.56	
Rejected ballots		2,878	2.44	
Majority		18,520	16.13	
Registered electors		256,278		

== Election 2008 ==
General elections were held on 18 February 2008. Javed Iqbal Warraich of PPP won by 50,090 votes.

General Election 2008: NA-196 Rahim Yar Khan V
Party	Candidate	Votes	%	±%
PPP	Javed Iqbal Warraich	52,090	37.03	
Independent	Mian Imtiaz Ahmed	47,205	33.56	
PML(N)	Ch. Muhammad Jafar Iqbal	20,307	14.44	
PML(Q)	Ch. Zaffar Iqbal Warraich	18,375	13.06	
Others	Others (six candidates)	2,693	1.91	
Turnout		145,222	41.15	
Total valid votes		140,670	96.87	
Rejected ballots		4,552	3.13	
Majority		4,885	3.47	
Registered electors		352,887		
PPP hold				

== Election 2013 ==
General elections were held on 11 May 2013. According to 2013 delimitations Rahim Yar Khan city was NA-196 (Rahim Yar Khan-V). Mian Imtiaz Ahmed of PML-N won by 106,595 votes and became the member of National Assembly.

General Election 2013: NA-196 Rahim Yar Khan V
Party	Candidate	Votes	%	±%
PML(N)	Mian Imtiaz Ahmed	106,595	54.21	
PPP	Javed Iqbal Warraich	56,342	28.65	
PTI	Shahid Talib	27,865	14.17	
Independent	Munir Ahmad Warraich	1,286	0.65	
Independent	Mehran Das	914	0.46	
Independent	Javed lqbal	867	0.44	
Independent	Haji Asjad lqbal	641	0.33	
Independent	Muhammad Fayyaz Hanif Rahi Advocate	617	0.31	
Independent	Mian Ijaz Amir	361	0.18	
MQM-P	Muhammad Nadeem Anwar	344	0.17	
TTP	Rana Muhammad Sharif Sajid	338	0.17	
Independent	Hassan Abbas	203	0.10	
Independent	Doctor Riaz Ahmad Khan	186	0.09	
Independent	Punnu Gee Bhail	82	0.04	
Turnout		201,795	58.99	
Total valid votes		196,641	97.45	
Rejected ballots		5,154	2.55	
Majority		50,253	25.56	
Registered electors		342,027		
PML(N) gain from PPP				

== Election 2018 ==
According to 2018 delimitations NA-196 was changed to NA-179. General elections were held on 25 July 2018. Javed Iqbal Warraich won the election by 100,877 votes and became the member of 15th National Assembly of Pakistan.

General Election 2018: NA-179 Rahim Yar Khan-V
Party	Candidate	Votes	%	±%
PTI	Javed Iqbal Warraich	110,877	44.44	▲30.27
PML(N)	Mian Imtiaz Ahmed	88,871	35.62	▼18.59
PPP	Muhammad Amir Shehbaz	35,712	14.31	▼14.34
MMA	Noor Ahmed Sial	3,852	1.54	
TLP	Hafiza Farah Naz	3,218	1.29	
AAT	Shahid Hameed	2,012	0.81	
Independent	Qamar Javed	1,872	0.75	
Independent	Javed lqbal	1,852	0.74	▲0.30
TLI	Ali Ahmad Shah	502	0.2	
Independent	Sajid lqbal	346	0.14	
Independent	Azam Shabbir	257	0.1	
PTI-N	Abdul Rashid Ahmad	111	0.04	
Turnout		253,601	57.31	▼1.68
Total valid votes		249,482	98.38	
Rejected ballots		4,119	1.62	
Majority		22,006	8.82	
Registered electors		442,531		
PTI gain from PML(N)				

== Election 2024 ==
General elections were held on 8 February 2024. Javed Iqbal Warraich won the election with 129,727 votes.

General Election 2024: NA-172 Rahim Yar Khan-IV
Party	Candidate	Votes	%	±%
PTI	Javed Iqbal Warraich (Note: Filed nomination papers as PTI candidate but ECP allowed him to run as an Independent)	129,727	51.11	▲6.67
PML(N)	Mian Imtiaz Ahmed	84,893	33.45	▼2.17
PPP	Choudhary Zafar Iqbal Warraich	21,080	8.30	▼6.01
Others	Others (nine candidates)	18,126	7.14	
Turnout		258,021	50.52	▼6.79
Total valid votes		253,826	98.37	
Rejected ballots		4,195	1.63	
Majority		44,834	17.66	▲8.84
Registered electors		510,749		

== See also ==
- NA-171 Rahim Yar Khan-III
- NA-173 Rahim Yar Khan-V
