= Najibuddin Awaisi =

Pakistani politician

- نجیب الدین اویسی

Member of the National Assembly of Pakistan
- In office 13 August 2018 – 10 August 2023
- Constituency: NA-173 (Bahawalpur-IV)
- In office 1 June 2013 – 31 May 2018
- Constituency: NA-184 (Bahawalpur-II)

Personal details
- Other political affiliations: PMLN (2013-2025)
- Relations: Mian Muhammad Shoaib Awaisi (nephew)
- Children: Usman Owaisi (son)

Mian Najeebuddin Awaisi (Urdu: میاں نجیب الدین اویسی) is a Pakistani politician who had been a member of the National Assembly of Pakistan from August 2018 till August 2023. Previously, he was a member of the National Assembly from June 2013 to May 2018.

== Political career ==
He served as Tehsil Nazim of Bahawalpur in 2002.

He ran for the seat of the National Assembly of Pakistan as a candidate of Pakistan Muslim League (Q) (PML-Q) from Constituency NA-184 (Bahawalpur-II) in the 2008 Pakistani general election but was unsuccessful. He received 38,407 votes and lost the seat to an independent candidate, Malik Aamir Yar Waran.

He ran for the seat of the National Assembly as a candidate of Pakistan Muslim League (N) (PML-N) from Constituency NA-184 (Bahawalpur-II) in by-election held in September 2010 but was unsuccessful. He received 48,776 votes and lost the seat to Khadija Aamir Yar Malik.

He was elected to the National Assembly as a candidate of PML-N from Constituency NA-184 (Bahawalpur-II) in the 2013 Pakistani general election. He received 94,429 votes and defeated Khadija Aamir Yar Malik.

In May 2016, he was appointed as Federal Parliamentary Secretary for Commerce. In October 2017, he was made parliamentary secretary for narcotics control.

He was re-elected to the National Assembly as a candidate of PML-N from Constituency NA-173 (Bahawalpur-IV) in the 2018 Pakistani general election.
