= PP-183 Kasur-IX =

Constituency of the Provincial Assembly of Punjab, Pakistan

- Constituency for the Provincial Assembly of Punjab
- Region: Pattoki Tehsil (partly) of Kasur District

Current constituency
- Created from: PP-183 Kasur-IX (2002-2018); PP-180 Kasur-VII (2018-2023)

PP-183 Kasur-IX (پی پی-183، قصور-9) is a Constituency of Provincial Assembly of Punjab.

== General elections 2024 ==
Provincial election 2024: PP-183 Kasur-IX
Party	Candidate	Votes	%	±%
PML(N)	Rana Sikandar Hayat	52,297	43.05	
Independent	Sardar Asif Nakai	39,804	32.76	
Independent	Rana Almas Liaqat	15,107	12.44	
TLP	Muhammad Sabir Ali Wadri	9,193	7.57	
Others	Others (sixteen candidates)	5,085	4.18	
Turnout		126,036	60.49	
Total valid votes		121,486	96.39	
Rejected ballots		4,550	3.61	
Majority		12,493	10.29	
Registered electors		208,371		
hold				

== General elections 2018 ==
Provincial election 2018: PP-180 Kasur-VII
Party	Candidate	Votes	%	±%
PTI	Sardar Muhammad Asif Nakai	54,092	45.59	
PML(N)	Rana Muhammad Hayat Khan	46,177	38.92	
TLP	Rana Tanveer Riaz Khan	5,660	4.77	
TLI	Muhammad Sabir Ali Qadri	4,311	3.63	
AAT	Muhammad Abu Bakar Saddique	2,916	2.46	
PPP	Syed Naveed Ul Hassan Shah	1,929	1.63	
Independent	Sardar Muhammad Atif Nakai	1,528	1.29	
Others	Others (six candidates)	2,048	1.72	
Turnout		121,843	61.35	
Total valid votes		118,661	97.39	
Rejected ballots		3,182	2.61	
Majority		7,915	6.67	
Registered electors		198,604		

== General elections 2013 ==
Provincial election 2013: PP-183 Kasur-IX
Party	Candidate	Votes	%	±%
PML(Q)	Sardar Muhammad Asif Nakai	35,160	41.69	
PML(N)	Chaudhary Muhammad Ibrahim Khan	34,349	40.72	
PTI	Malik Ashiq Hussain	3,979	4.72	
PST	Hafiz Muhammad Shahid Hussain	2,699	3.20	
JI	Muhammad Irfan	2,354	2.79	
Independent	Qamar Abbas	2,040	2.42	
Independent	Alhaj Sarfraz Ahmad Khan Rai	1,460	1.73	
Jamiat Ulema-e-Pakistan	Bashir Ahmad	1,391	1.65	
Others	Others (seven candidates)	914	1.08	
Turnout		88,069	66.01	
Total valid votes		84,346	95.77	
Rejected ballots		3,723	4.23	
Majority		811	0.97	
Registered electors		133,427		

== General elections 2008 ==
Contesting candidates	Party affiliation	Votes polled

== See also ==
- PP-182 Kasur-VIII
- PP-184 Kasur-X
