= NA-166 Bahawalpur-III =

Constituency of the National Assembly of Pakistan

- Constituency for the National Assembly of Pakistan
- Region: Ahmadpur East Tehsil (partly) including Ahmedpur East and Uch cities of Bahawalpur District
- Electorate: 437,448

Current constituency
- Party: Pakistan Muslim League (N)
- Member: Makhdoom Syed Sami Ul Hassan Gillani
- Created from: NA-183 Bahawalpur-I

NA-166 Bahawalpur-III (این اے-166، بہاولپور-3) is a constituency for the National Assembly of Pakistan.

== Members of Parliament ==
=== 2018–2023: NA-174 Bahawalpur-V ===
Election	Member	Party
2018	Makhdoom Syed Sami Ul Hassan Gillani	PTI

=== 2024–present: NA-166 Bahawalpur-III ===
Election	Member	Party
2024	Makhdoom Syed Sami Ul Hassan Gillani	PML(N)

== Election 2002 ==
General elections were held on 10 October 2002. Makhdoom Zada Syed Ali Hassan Gillani of PML-Q won by 51,435 votes.

General election 2002: NA-183 Bahawalpur-I
Party	Candidate	Votes	%	±%
PML(Q)	Makhdoom Syed Ali Hassan Gillani	51,435	46.48	
Independent	Mukhdoom Syed Sohail Hassan Gilani	30,482	27.54	
MMA	Manzoor Ahmad Naumani	25,198	22.77	
PML(N)	Malik Muhammad Ramzan	2,568	2.32	
NA	Taj Muhammad Khan Langah	988	0.89	
Turnout		114,216	42.01	
Total valid votes		110,671	96.90	
Rejected ballots		3,545	3.10	
Majority		20,953	18.94	
Registered electors		271,891		

== Election 2008 ==
General elections were held on 18 February 2008. Arif Aziz Sheikh of PPP won by 71,394 votes.

General election 2008: NA-183 Bahawalpur-I
Party	Candidate	Votes	%	±%
PPP	Arif Aziz Shaikh	71,394	62.55	
PML(Q)	Mukhdoom Syed Sami-UI-Hassan Gilani	39,644	34.73	
Others	Others (three candidates)	3,107	2.72	
Turnout		116,945	37.13	
Total valid votes		114,145	97.61	
Rejected ballots		2,800	2.39	
Majority		31,750	27.82	
Registered electors		314,932		
PPP gain from PML(Q)				

== Election 2013 ==
General elections were held on 11 May 2013. Makhdoom Syed Ali Hassan Gillani of PML-N won by 61,891 votes and became the member of National Assembly.

General election 2013: NA-183 Bahawalpur-I
Party	Candidate	Votes	%	±%
PML(N)	Makhdoom Syed Ali Hassan Gillani	61,891	38.95	
Bahawalpur National Awami Party	Mukhdoom Syed Sami-UI-Hassan Gilani	47,381	29.81	
PPP	Arif Aziz Shaikh	24,613	15.49	
Independent	Sahibzada Muhammad Gazain Abbasi	16,547	10.41	
Others	Others (eleven candidates)	8,489	5.34	
Turnout		165,681	55.90	
Total valid votes		158,921	95.92	
Rejected ballots		6,660	4.08	
Majority		14,510	9.14	
Registered electors		296,231		
PML(N) gain from PPP				

== Election 2018 ==
General elections were held on 25 July 2018.

General election 2018: NA-174 Bahawalpur-V
Party	Candidate	Votes	%	±%
PTI	Makhdoom Syed Sami Ul Hassan Gillani	63,884	34.14	
Independent	Prince Bahawal Abbas Abbasi	58,092	31.05	
PPP	Syed Ali Hassan Gilani	51,359	27.45	
Others	Others (six candidates)	13,765	7.36	
Turnout		194,025	52.68	
Total valid votes		187,100	96.43	
Rejected ballots		6,925	3.57	
Majority		5,792	3.10	
Registered electors		368,276		
PTI gain from PML(N)				

== Election 2024 ==
General elections were held on 8 February 2024. Makhdoom Syed Sami Ul Hassan Gillani won the election with 62,157 votes.

General election 2024: NA-166 Bahawalpur-III
Party	Candidate	Votes	%	±%
PML(N)	Makhdoom Syed Sami Ul Hassan Gillani	62,157	29.21	
Bahawalpur National Awami Party	Prince Bahawal Abbas Abbasi	48,606	22.84	▼8.21
PPP	Syed Ali Hassan Gilani	48,380	22.73	▼4.72
PTI	Kanwal Shauzab (Note: Filed nomination papers as PTI candidate but ECP allowed her to run as an Independent)	35,407	16.64	▼17.50
Others	Others (eight candidates)	18,254	8.58	
Turnout		220,241	50.35	▼2.33
Total valid votes		212,804	96.36	
Rejected ballots		7,437	3.64	
Majority		13,551	6.37	
Registered electors		437,448		
PML(N) gain from PTI				

== See also ==
- NA-165 Bahawalpur-II
- NA-167 Bahawalpur-IV
