= Chaudhry Abid Raza =

Pakistani politician

Member of the National Assembly of Pakistan
- In office 13 August 2018 – 10 August 2023
- Constituency: NA-71 (Gujrat-IV)
- In office 1 June 2013 – 31 May 2018
- Constituency: NA-107 (Gujrat-IV)

Personal details
- Born: 2 September 1972 (age 54) Gujrat, Punjab, Pakistan
- Party: PRM (2026-present)
- Other political affiliations: PMLN (2013-2025)

Chaudhry Abid Raza (Urdu: چوہدری عابد رضا; born 2 September 1972) is a Pakistani politician. He had been a member of the National Assembly of Pakistan from August 2018 till August 2023, and from June 2013 to May 2018.

== Early life and education ==
Abid Raza was born on 2 September 1972 in Kotla Arab Ali Khan, Kharian, Gujrat District. His father was elected chairman UC Kotla in the 60s, his family being well-known in local politics. He lost his father, Chaudhary Abdul Malik when he was four, in a local feud by the Doiyan group.

He belongs to a Punjabi Gujjar family with traditionally a Barelvi affiliation, but later became associated with the Deobandi school of thought.

In terms of education, he has a Shahadat-ul-Almia degree, considered an equivalent to an MA in Arabic and Islamic Studies, while by profession he's a rice trader.

== Political career ==
=== Militant politics ===
After the murder of his father in 1981, his eldest brother Haji Abdul Khaliq took the reins of family, and settled the scores with the rival Doiyan group by killing Riyasat Ali Doiyan.

While this saw a thaw in the fighting, later on however, in a misunderstanding when Inayat Ali Doiyan was killed by dacoits, the Doiyan group and Bouch group retaliated by killing Haji Abdul Khaliq in 1994.

Infuriated by the killing of his elder brother, Abid who was just 17 swung in action, making an attempt on the life of Sarwar Bouch (former MPA), who managed to survive but lost six of his cohorts.

In 1997, a curfew was imposed in Kotla Arab Ali Khan which led to a strong clash between the locals, and police.

He was subsequently arrested, and handed a death sentence through an anti-terror act in 1998, for murdering six peoples in an attempt to assassinate Ghulam Sarwar Bhooch(who was also sentenced to death for the murder of Haji Abdul Khaliq), the nazim of Gujrat and a family rival, as well as having links with Lashkar-e-Jhangvi and Sipah-e-Sahaba, while in 2003 he was accused of helping Amjad Farooqi, an Islamist who planned to kill Musharraf. He denied all these allegations and connections with militant outfits. His death sentence was not carried out and he was released after five years in jail on account of reaching a compromise with the opposing party, as per Islamic law.

Evenetually, both families ended their feud by signing a Razi-Nama (a mutual settlement deed), which led to his acquittal.

=== Mainstream politics ===
His father began his political career with Pakistan Peoples Party (PPP) where he was elected Chairman UC Kotla in 1960. His family joined PML-Q in 2003.

He joined Pakistan Muslim League (N) (PML-N) in 2008, following disagreements with his elder brother Naeem Raza after the killing of his close confidant in a police encounter. Hamza Shahbaz Sharif is supposed to be the one who pushed his inclusion in the PML-N despite the controversies, "to appease the Kotlas."

He was elected to the National Assembly of Pakistan as a candidate of PML-N from Constituency NA-107 (Gujrat-IV) in 2013. He received 94,196 votes and defeated Chaudhry Muhammad Ilyas, a candidate of Pakistan Tehreek-e-Insaf (PTI). His younger brother Shabbir Ahmed Kotla was also elected from the PP-115 to Provincial Assembly of Punjab.

He was re-elected to the National Assembly as a candidate of PML-N from Constituency NA-71 (Gujrat-IV) in 2018. He received 88,588 votes and defeated Muhammad Ilyas Chaudhry, a candidate of PTI.

== See more ==
- List of Deobandis
