= Wan Adhen =

- Town
- Location within Pakistan
- Coordinates: 30°56′56″N 73°44′36″E
- Country: Pakistan
- Province: Punjab
- District: Kasur
- Time zone: UTC+5 (PST)

Wan Aadhan (Urdu: واں آدهن), is a town and Union Council of Kasur District in the Punjab province of Pakistan. It is part of Pattoki Tehsil and is located at 31°2'10N 73°55'0E with an altitude of 187 metres (616 feet).
