= Chakoki =

- Village
- Location in Punjab, India Chakoki (India)
- Coordinates: 31.542396°N 75.379838°E
- Country: India
- State: Punjab
- District: Kapurthala

Government
  - Type: Panchayati raj (India)
  - Body: Gram panchayat

Population (2011)
  - Total: 1,891
- Sex ratio 987/904♂/♀

Languages
  - Official: Punjabi
  - Other spoken: Hindi
- Time zone: UTC+5:30 (IST)
- PIN: 144624
- Telephone code: 01822
- ISO 3166 code: IN-PB
- Vehicle registration: PB-09
- Website: kapurthala.gov.in

Chakoki is a village in Kapurthala district of Punjab State, India. It is located 27 kilometres (17 mi) from Kapurthala, which is both district and sub-district headquarters of Chakoki. The village is administrated by a Sarpanch, who is an elected representative.

== Demography ==
According to the report published by Census India in 2011, Chakoki has a total number of 369 houses and population of 1,891 of which include 987 males and 904 females. Literacy rate of Chakoki is 68.71%, lower than state average of 75.84%. The population of children under the age of 6 years is 207 which is 10.95% of total population of Chakoki, and child sex ratio is approximately 971, higher than state average of 846.

== Population data ==
Particulars	Total	Male	Female
Total No. of Houses	369	-	-
Population	1,891	987	904
Child (0-6)	207	105	102
Schedule Caste	1,248	648	600
Schedule Tribe	0	0	0
Literacy	68.71 %	73.92 %	62.97 %
Total Workers	615	538	77
Main Worker	591	0	0
Marginal Worker	24	18	6

== Air travel connectivity ==
The closest airport to the village is Sri Guru Ram Dass Jee International Airport.
