= Phool Muhammad Khan =

Pakistani politician

رانا پُھول مُحمّد خاں
- Born: Gumthal, Garhu
- Died: 14 March 1992; Phool Nagar
Names
- Rana Phool Muhammad Khan
- Religion: Islam

Rana Phool Muhammad Khan (Late) (Urdu: رانا پُھول مُحَمَّد خاں) was a Pakistani politician belonging to a Rajput family. He was a member of the Provincial Assembly of the Punjab (MPA), representing Phoolnagar in 1970 and 1977. He also twice served as a provincial minister of Punjab, in 1985 and 1990. He was the uncle of politician, Rana Muhammad Hayat.

== Town renamed ==
The town of Bhai Pheru was renamed Phool Nagar after Rana Phool.

== See also ==
- Elections in Pakistan
- List of political parties in Pakistan
- 2007 Pakistani presidential election
- 2008 Pakistani presidential election
- 2008 in Pakistan
