= Sheikh Fayyaz Ud Din =

Pakistani politician

- شیخ فیاض الدین

Member of the National Assembly of Pakistan
- In office 13 August 2018 – 10 August 2023
- Constituency: NA-176 (Rahim Yar Khan-II)
- In office 1 June 2013 – 31 May 2018
- Constituency: NA-193 (Rahim Yar Khan-II)

Personal details
- Born: December 15, 1945 (age 80) Rahim Yar Khan, Punjab, Pakistan
- Party: PMLN (2013-2025)

Sheikh Fayyaz Ud Din (Urdu: شیخ فیاض الدین; born 15 December 1945) is a Pakistani politician who had been a member of the National Assembly of Pakistan from August 2018 to August 2023. Previously he was a member of the National Assembly from June 2013 to May 2018.

== Early life ==
He was born on 15 December 1945.

== Political career ==
He was elected to the National Assembly of Pakistan as a candidate of Pakistan Muslim League (N) (PML-N) from Constituency NA-193 (Rahim Yar Khan-II) in the 2013 Pakistani general election. He received 86,232 votes and defeated Mian Abdul Sattar.

He was re-elected to the National Assembly as a candidate of PML-N from Constituency NA-176 (Rahim Yar Khan-II) in the 2018 Pakistani general election.
