= Mian Imtiaz Ahmed =

Pakistani politician

- میاں امتیاز احمد

Member of the National Assembly of Pakistan
- In office 1 June 2013 – 31 May 2018
- Constituency: NA-196 (Rahim Yar Khan-V)

Personal details
- Born: April 14, 1961 (age 65)
- Party: PMLN

Mian Imtiaz Ahmad (Urdu: میاں امتیاز احمد; born 14 April 1961) is a Pakistani politician who had been a member of the National Assembly of Pakistan, from June 2013 to May 2018. Previously he had been a member of the Provincial Assembly of Punjab from 1993 to 1999.

== Early life ==
He was born on 14 April 1961 in a landlord Arain family of RahimYarKhan.

== Political career ==
Ahmad was elected to the Provincial Assembly of Punjab as a candidate of Pakistan Muslim League (N) (PML-N) from Constituency PP-237 (Rahim Yar Khan-VI) in the 1993 Pakistani general election. He received 42,851 votes and defeated Irfan Abdullah, a candidate of Pakistan Peoples Party (PPP).

He was re-elected to the Provincial Assembly of Punjab as a candidate of PML-N from Constituency PP-237 (Rahim Yar Khan-VI) in the 1997 Pakistani general election. He received 44,119 votes and defeated Tariq Mehmood Chaudhry, a candidate of PPP.

He ran for the seat of the National Assembly of Pakistan as an independent candidate from Constituency NA-196 (Rahim Yar Khan-V) in the 2008 Pakistani general election but was unsuccessful. He received 47,205 votes and lost the seat to Javed Iqbal Warraich.

He joined PML(N) in 2011.

He was elected to the National Assembly as a candidate of PML(N) Constituency NA-196 (Rahim Yar Khan-V) in the 2013 Pakistani general election. He received 106,595 votes and defeated Javed Iqbal Warraich. During his tenure as Member of the National Assembly, he served as the Federal Parliamentary Secretary for Ports and Shipping.

He ran for the seat of the National Assembly as an candidate of the PML(N) from NA-179 Rahim Yar Khan-V in the 2018 Pakistani general election but was unsuccessful. He received 88,871 votes and lost to Javed Iqbal Warraich, a candidate of the Pakistan Tehreek-e-Insaf (PTI).
