= Sardar Asif Nakai =

Pakistani politician (born 1960)

Sardar Muhammad Asif Nakai

Provincial Minister of Punjab for Exice and Taxation
- In office 5 August 2022 – 14 January 2023

Member of the Provincial Assembly of the Punjab
- In office 15 August 2018 – 14 January 2023
- Constituency: PP-180 Kasur-VII
- In office 20 March 2008 – 31 May 2018

Personal details
- Born: 28 August 1958 (age 68) Kasur, Punjab, Pakistan
- Party: IPP (2023-present)
- Other political affiliations: PTI (2018–2023); PML(Q) (2002–2018)
- Parent: Sardar Arif Nakai (father)

Punjab Assembly Lahore

Sardar Muhammad Asif Nakai is a Pakistani politician who was Provincial Minister of Punjab for Communication and Works, in office from 27 August 2018 till April 2022. He had been a member of the Provincial Assembly of the Punjab from August 2018 till January 2023.

Previously he was a Member of the Provincial Assembly of the Punjab from 2008 to 2018 and a member of the National Assembly of Pakistan from 2002 to 2007. He was Minister of State for Housing and works from 2004 to 2007.

== Early life and education ==
He was born on 28 August 1960 in Kasur. He is a direct descendant of Heera Singh Sandhu founder of the Nakai Misl; hence is also related to Maharani Datar Kaur, wife of Maharaja Ranjit Singh.

He graduated in 1983 form University of the Punjab and has the degree of Bachelor of Arts.

== Political career ==
He contested and won from both NA-140 and NA-141 in 2002. He was elected to the National Assembly of Pakistan as a candidate of Pakistan Muslim League (Q) (PML-Q) from Constituency NA-141 (Kasur-IV) in the 2002 Pakistani general election. In September 2004, he was inducted into the federal cabinet and was made Minister of State for Housing and Works.

He was elected to the Provincial Assembly of the Punjab as a candidate of PML-Q from Constituency PP-183 (Kasur-IX) in the 2008 Pakistani general election.

He was re-elected to the Provincial Assembly of the Punjab as a candidate of PML-Q from Constituency PP-183 (Kasur-IX) in the 2013 Pakistani general election.

He was re-elected to the Provincial Assembly of the Punjab as a candidate of the Pakistan Tehreek-e-Insaf (PTI) from PP-180 (Kasur-VII) in the 2018 Punjab provincial election.

On 27 August 2018, he was inducted into the provincial Punjab cabinet of Chief Minister Sardar Usman Buzdar and was appointed Provincial Minister of Punjab for Communication and Works.

He ran for a seat in the Provincial Assembly from PP-180 Kasur-VII as an independent candidate in 2024.
