= Syed Ali Hassan Gilani =

Pakistani politician (1974–2024)

- سید علی حسن گیلانی

Member of the National Assembly of Pakistan
- In office 1 June 2013 – 31 May 2018
- Constituency: NA-166 (Bahawalpur-I)

Personal details
- Born: 16 September 1974 Pakistan
- Died: 1 December 2024 (aged 50) Uch, Punjab, Pakistan
- Party: PPP (2008-2024)

Makhdoom Zada Syed Ali Hassan Gillani (Urdu: مخدوم سید علی حسن گیلانی; 16 September 1974 – 1 December 2024) was a Pakistani politician who was a member of the National Assembly of Pakistan, from June 2013 to May 2018 and from 2002 to 2007.

== Early life ==
Gilani was born on 16 September 1974.

== Political career ==
Gilani was elected to the National Assembly as a candidate of Pakistan Muslim League (Q) (PML-Q) from Constituency NA-183 (Bahawalpur-I) in the 2002 Pakistani general election. He received 51,435 votes and defeated an independent candidate, Syed Sohail Hasan Gillani.

He was disqualified to run for the seat of the National Assembly in the 2008 Pakistani general election for being defaulter of the Tehsil Municipal Administration.

Gilani was re-elected to the National Assembly as a candidate of Pakistan Muslim League (N) (PML-N) from Constituency NA-183 (Bahawalpur-I) in the 2013 Pakistani general election. He received 61,891 votes and defeated Makhdoom Syed Sami Ul Hassan, a candidate of Bahawalpur National Awami Party. He joined Pakistan Peoples Party and lost election 2018 by obtaining 51359 votes against Makhdoom Syed Sami Ul Hassan Gillani.

== Death ==
Gilani died in a traffic collision in Uch Sharif, on 1 December 2024, at the age of 50. Another person was also killed and three others were injured.
