= NA-142 (Kasur-V) =

Former constituency of the National Assembly of Pakistan

Constituency NA-142 (Kasur-V)
- Former constituency for the National Assembly of Pakistan
- Region: Kasur District

Former constituency
- Created: 2002
- Abolished: 2018
- Replaced by: Constituency NA-140 (Kasur-IV)

Constituency NA-142 (Kasur-V) (Urdu: این اے-۱۴٢، قصور-۵) was a constituency for the National Assembly of Pakistan. It comprised mainly the city of Phool Nagar, which, according to the 2018 delimitations, has now been included in Constituency NA-140 (Kasur-IV).

== Election 2002 ==
General elections were held on 10 October 2002. Sardar Muhammad Asif Nakai of PML-Q won by 58,420 votes.

General election 2002: NA-142 Kasur-V
Party	Candidate	Votes	%	±%
PML(Q)	Sardar Muhammad Asif Nakai	58,420	53.63	
Independent	Rana Mohammad Hayat Khan	43,921	40.32	
MMA	Muhammad Ramzan	3,546	3.26	
Independent	Rana Muhammad Arif Khan	2,628	2.41	
Independent	Sardar Majid Akhtar Nakai	413	0.38	
Turnout		111,706	47.65	
Total valid votes		108,928	97.51	
Rejected ballots		2,778	2.49	
Majority		14,499	13.31	
Registered electors		234,431		

== By-Election 2003 ==
By-Election 2003: NA-142 Kasur-V
Party	Candidate	Votes	%	±%
PML(Q)	Sardar Talib Hussain Nakai	48,935	51.00	
PML(N)	Rana Mohammad Hayat Khan	46,042	47.99	
Others	Others (five candidates)	971	1.01	.
Turnout		97,409	41.55	
Total valid votes		95,948	98.50	
Rejected ballots		1,461	1.50	
Majority		2,893	3.01	
Registered electors		234,431		

== Election 2008 ==
General elections were held on 18 February 2008. Sardar Talib Hassan Nakai of PML-Q won by 47,192 votes.

General election 2008: NA-142 Kasur-V
Party	Candidate	Votes	%	±%
PML(Q)	Sardar Talib Hassan Nakai	47,192	39.43	
PML(N)	Rana Mohammad Hayat Khan	45,538	38.05	
PPP	Nasira Arshad	24,714	20.65	
Others	Others (five candidates)	2,249	1.87	
Turnout		123,852	54.93	
Total valid votes		119,693	96.64	
Rejected ballots		4,159	3.36	
Majority		1,654	1.38	
Registered electors		225,459		

== Election 2013 ==
General elections were held on 11 May 2013. Rana Muhammad Hayat Khan of PML-N won by 85,243 votes and became the member of National Assembly.

General election 2013: NA-142 Kasur-V
Party	Candidate	Votes	%	±%
PML(N)	Rana Mohammad Hayat Khan	85,243	49.09	
PML(Q)	Sardar Talib Hassan Nakai	65,758	37.87	
PTI	Rana Tanveer Riaz Khan	18,325	10.55	
Others	Others (ten candidates)	4,320	2.49	
Turnout		179,745	64.58	
Total valid votes		173,646	96.61	
Rejected ballots		6,099	3.39	
Majority		19,485	11.22	
Registered electors		278,336		
