= NA-141 (Kasur-IV) =

Former constituency of the National Assembly of Pakistan

- Former constituency for the National Assembly of Pakistan
- Region: Kasur District

Former constituency
- Created: 2002
- Abolished: 2018
- Replaced by: NA-139 (Kasur-III); NA-140 (Kasur-IV)

NA-141 (Kasur-IV) (Urdu: این اے-۱۴۱، قصور-۴) was a constituency for the National Assembly of Pakistan.

== Area ==
The constituency consisted of the areas in the Chunian Tehsil and Pattoki Tehsil which, according to the 2018 delimitations, have now been moved to NA-139 (Kasur-III) and NA-140 (Kasur-IV) respectively.

== Election 2002 ==
General elections were held on 10 Oct 2002. Sardar Muhammad Asif Nakai of PML-Q won by 57,063 votes.

General election 2002: NA-141 Kasur-IV
Party	Candidate	Votes	%	±%
PML(Q)	Sardar Muhammad Asif Nakai	57,063	52.96	
PML(N)	Rana Muhammad Ishaque Khan	42,518	39.46	
MMA	Syed Shabbir Ahmed Hashmi	3,301	3.06	
Independent	Mohd. Zaid Lakhvi	2,743	2.55	
Others	Others (five candidates)	2,118	1.97	
Turnout		110,932	43.26	
Total valid votes		107,743	97.13	
Rejected ballots		3,189	2.87	
Majority		14,545	13.50	
Registered electors		256,425		

== Election 2008 ==
General elections were held on 18 Feb 2008. Rana Muhammad Ishaq Khan of PML-N won by 58,807 votes.

General election 2008: NA-141 Kasur-IV
Party	Candidate	Votes	%	±%
PML(N)	Rana Muhammad Ishaque Khan	58,807	46.35	
PML(Q)	Sardar Muhammad Asif Nakai	44,468	35.05	
PPP	Rana Abdul Shakoor Khan	20,084	15.83	
Others	Others (eight candidates)	3,517	2.77	
Turnout		131,794	52.46	
Total valid votes		126,876	96.27	
Rejected ballots		4,918	3.73	
Majority		14,339	11.30	
Registered electors		251,254		

== Election 2013 ==
General elections were held on 11 May 2013. Rana Muhammad Ishaq Khan of PML-N won by 96,737 votes and became the member of National Assembly.

General election 2013: NA-141 Kasur-IV
Party	Candidate	Votes	%	±%
PML(N)	Rana Muhammad Ishaque Khan	96,737	51.51	
Independent	Sardar Muhammad Asif Nakai	66,886	35.62	
PTI	Akeel Aslam	11,989	6.38	
PPP	Syed Tariq Raza	4,536	2.42	
Others	Others (thirteen candidates)	7,652	4.07	
Turnout		195,039	63.00	
Total valid votes		187,800	96.29	
Rejected ballots		7,239	3.71	
Majority		29,851	15.89	
Registered electors		309,577		
