= Phool Nagar =

Phool Nagar Bhai Pheru
- City
- Location within Punjab, Pakistan Location within Pakistan
- Coordinates: 31.2050°N 73.9430°E
- Country: Pakistan
- Province: Punjab
- District: Kasur

Government
  - Type: Municipal Committee
  - Chairman: Rana Aamir Nisar
  - Vice Chairman: Vacant

Population (2023 census)
  - City: 114,530
  - Rank: 109th in Pakistan
- Time zone: UTC+5 (PST)

Phool Nagar (Punjabi and Urdu: پُھول نگر), previously Bhai Pheru (Urdu: بھائی پھیرو), is a city of the Kasur District in the Punjab province of Pakistan. The city is named after a former minister from the area, Rana Phool Muhammad Khan. Famous Personalities Faheem Ashraf The Rana Jee. International Cricketer Rana Muhammad Iqbal khan Ex speaker Punjab assembly and minister of Law Punjab. Rana Sikander Hayat Punjab Education Minister.

== Geography ==
The city lies on the N-5 National Highway about 58 kilometres (36 mi) from Lahore, the capital of the Punjab province.

== Surrounding area ==
A road from the city leads to the Changa Manga planted forest.

== Demographics ==
=== Population ===
Historical population
Year	Pop.	±% p.a.
1961	10,999	—
1972	19,404	+5.30%
1981	30,140	+5.01%
1998	56,113	+3.72%
2017	92,842	+2.69%
2023	114,530	+3.56%

Languages

Languages of Phool Nagar MC (2023 Census)
1. Punjabi (93.8%)
2. Urdu (3.40%)
3. Pashto (2.00%)
4. Others (0.80%)

== See also ==
- Alahabad
- Mustafaabad
- Sangat Sahib
