= 2024 Pakistani general election in Faisalabad =

- 8 February 2024

4 seats from Faisalabad in the National Assembly
- Registered: 2,149,890
- Turnout: 49.18%
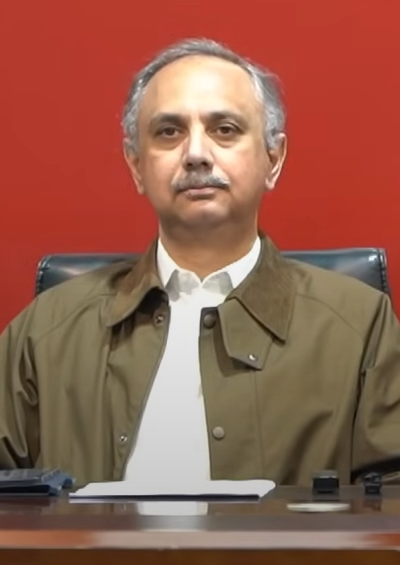

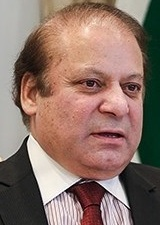
	First party	Second party
Leader	Omar Ayub Khan (Note: Served as candidate for Prime Minister appointed by Imran Khan.)	Nawaz Sharif (Note: Nawaz Sharif led the PML-N election campaign and would have become Prime Minister in the case that they won a majority of seats, with Shehbaz Sharif the candidate otherwise.)
Party	IND (backed by PTI) (Note: Contested as independent candidates in all constituencies) (Note: Although the PTI did not contest the election de jure, media coverage routinely counted the PTI-affiliated independents as a single bloc in their election reports: "Pakistan General Elections 2024 Candidates Party and List". ARYNEWS. Archived from the original on 11 February 2024.; "LIVE: Pakistan election results 2024 — Who is going to form next govt? PML-N, PPP step up efforts". www.geo.tv. Archived from the original on 11 February 2024.; "National Assembly Election Results 2024". elections.dunyanews.tv. Archived from the original on 11 February 2024.; "Never won a war, never lost an election: Did Imran Khan spoil Pakistan military's record?". The Times of India. 11 February 2024. Archived from the original on 11 February 2024.; Asrar, Nadim; Lodhi, Areesha. "Pakistan police threaten crackdown after Khan's PTI protests vote 'rigging'". Al Jazeera. Archived from the original on 11 February 2024.)	PML(N)
Last election	4 seats	48.24%, 0 seats
Seats won	4	0
Seat change	Steady	Steady
Popular vote	548,081	369,233
Percentage	52.43%	35.32%
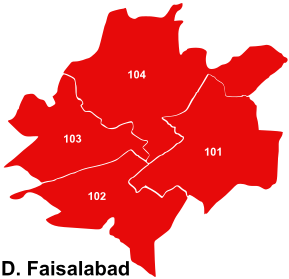
- The results map, by constituency

General elections were held in Faisalabad on 8 February 2024 to elect the 4 members of 15th National Assembly from Faisalabad.

Independent candidates backed by the PTI won all four seats.

== Candidates ==
The PML-N ran candidates in all constituencies. The PTI backed independents in all four constituencies

No.	Constituency	Candidates	
No.	Constituency	PTI-IND	PMLN
1	NA-101	Rana Atif	Irfan Ahmed
2	NA-102	Changaiz Ahmed Khan Kakar	Abid Sher Ali
3	NA-103	Muhammad Ali Sarfraz	Akram Ansari
4	NA-104	Sahibzada Hamid Raza	Daniyal Ahmed

== Results ==
=== City-wide ===
Party	Seats		Votes	
Party	Contested	Won	#	%
Pakistan Tehreek-e-Insaf	4	4	548,081	52.43
Pakistan Muslim League (N)	4	0	369,233	35.32
Tehreek-e-Labbaik Pakistan	4	0	47,332	4.53
Independents	N/A	0	80,752	7.72
Others	N/A	0	80,752	7.72
Total		3	1,045,398	100.0

=== By constituency ===
Constituency	Winner				Runner-up				Margin	Turnout
Constituency	Candidate	Party	Votes		Candidate	Party	Votes		Margin	Turnout
Constituency	Candidate	Party	No.	%	Candidate	Party	No.	%	No.	%
NA-101	Rana Atif	PTI	134,886	52.06	Irfan Ahmed	PML(N)	89,612	34.59	45,274	49.68
NA-102	Changaiz Ahmed Khan Kakar	PTI	132,553	51.04	Abid Sher Ali	PML(N)	100,328	38.63	32,225	48.88
NA-103	Muhammad Ali Sarfraz	PTI	147,987	56.78	Akram Ansari	PML(N)	86,683	33.26	61,304	48.53
NA-104	Sahibzada Hamid Raza	PTI	132,655	51.41	Daniyal Ahmed	PML(N)	92,610	35.89	40,045	49.63
