= NA-84 (Faisalabad-X) =

Constituency of the National Assembly of Pakistan

Constituency NA-84 (Faisalabad-X)
- Former constituency for the National Assembly of Pakistan
- Region: Faisalabad District

Former constituency
- Created: 2002
- Abolished: 2018
- Member: Abid Sher Ali
- Created from: NA-64 Faisalabad VIII
- Replaced by: NA-108 (Faisalabad-VIII)

NA-84 Faisalabad-X (این اے84، فیصل آباد -۱۰ ) is a constituency of the National Assembly of Pakistan, located within the Faisalabad District. This constituency encompasses part of Faisalabad City.

== Election 2002 ==
General elections were held on 10 Oct 2002. Abid Sher Ali of PML-N won by 33,455 votes.

General election 2002: NA-84 Faisalabad-X
Party	Candidate	Votes	%	±%
PML(N)	Abid Sher Ali	33,455	37.46	
NA	Fazl Hussain Rahi	24,092	26.98	
PPP	Babaruddin Chaudhary	22,484	25.18	
MMA	Muhammad Ghulam Rasool	6,629	7.42	
Others	Others (six candidates)	2,650	2.96	
Turnout		90,881	35.34	
Total valid votes		89,310	98.27	
Rejected ballots		1,571	1.73	
Majority		9,363	10.48	
Registered electors		257,162		

== Election 2008 ==
General elections were held on 18 Feb 2008. Abid Sher Ali of PML-N won by 59,616 votes.

General election 2008: NA-84 Faisalabad-X
Party	Candidate	Votes	%	±%
PML(N)	Abid Sher Ali	59,616	53.20	
PPP	Mehar Abdul Rashid	38,421	34.28	
PML(Q)	Rana Zahid Mahmood	11,925	10.64	
Others	Others (six candidates)	2,106	1.88	
Turnout		113,873	45.66	
Total valid votes		180,530	98.42	
Rejected ballots		1,805	1.58	
Majority		21,195	18.92	
Registered electors		249,391		
PML(N) hold				

== Election 2013 ==
General elections were held on 11 May 2013.

Abid Sher Ali of PML-N won by 103,176 votes and became the member of National Assembly.

General election 2013: NA-84 Faisalabad-X
Party	Candidate	Votes	%	±%
PML(N)	Abid Sher Ali	103,268	57.20	
PTI	Farrukh Habib	42,487	23.53	
PPP	Malik Asghar Ali Qaisar	21,572	11.95	
Others	Others (fourteen candidates)	13,203	7.32	
Turnout		185,039	59.90	
Total valid votes		180,530	97.56	
Rejected ballots		4,509	2.44	
Majority		60,781	33.67	
Registered electors		308,900		
PML(N) hold				
