= Chaudhry Ali Akhter Khan =

Pakistani politician

Member of the Provincial Assembly of the Punjab
- In office 15 August 2018 – 14 January 2023
- Constituency: PP-99 Faisalabad-III

Personal details
- Born: 10 February 1954 (age 72) Faisalabad, Punjab, Pakistan
- Party: IPP (2023-present)
- Other political affiliations: IND (2022-2023); PTI (2016–2022); IND (2013-2016); PML(Q) (2002–2013); PMLN (1997–2002); PPP (1988–1997)

Chaudhry Ali Akhter Khan (born 10 February 1954) is a Pakistani politician who had been a member of the Provincial Assembly of the Punjab from August 2018 till January 2023.

== Political career ==
He first contested as an independent in the 1993 Pakistani general election on MPA seat from PP-46 Faisalabad but was defeated. He had got 1503 votes in that election.

He again contested as an independent in the 2002 Pakistani general election on MPA seat from PP-55 Faisalabad but was defeated. He had got 2403 votes in that election.

He again contested on the ticket of Pakistan Muslim League (Q) in the 2013 Pakistani general election on MPA seat from PP-62 Faisalabad but was defeated by Raza Nasrullah Ghumman of PMLN. Raza Nasrullah got 53,520 Votes and won by a heavy margin.

He was elected to the Provincial Assembly of the Punjab as a candidate of Pakistan Tehreek-e-Insaf from Constituency PP-99 (Faisalabad-III) in the 2018 Pakistani general election.

In 2023, Ali Akhter quit Pakistan Tehreek-e-Insaf by levelling serious corruption allegation on former Prime Minister of Pakistan Imran Khan while addressing a press conference along with former MPA's Muhammad Waris Aziz, Shakeel Shahid, Rana Zahid Mahmood and Rana Israr Ahmad.

He contested on the ticket of Istehkam-e-Pakistan Party in the 2024 Pakistani general election on MPA seat from PP-106 Faisalabad but was defeated by Rai Ahsan Kharal of PTI. Rai Ahsan Kharal got 65,989 votes and defeated Ali Akhter by a heavy margin of 35,459 votes.
