= Tauseef =

Tauseef, Tausif or Tawsif (Arabic, Persian and Urdu: توصيف; Bengali: তৌসিফ, Punjabi: ਤੌਸੀਫ਼) is a name of Arabic origin and may refer to:

== As a male given name ==
- Tauseef Ahmed (born 1958), Pakistani cricketer
- Md. Tauseef Alam (born 1980), Indian politician
- Tauseef Bukhari (born 1964), Pakistani cricketer
- Tawsif Mahbub (born 1988), Bangladeshi actor
- Tauseef Satti (born 1980), Pakistani cricketer

== As a surname ==
- Afzal Tauseef (1936–2014), Pakistani writer and journalist
- Rana Asif Tauseef (born 1967), Pakistani politician
- Rana Zahid Tauseef (born 1950), Pakistani politician
