= Mushtaq =

Mushtaq or Mushtak (pronounced [mʊʃˈtaːq]) is a masculine given name and surname of Arabic origin. Notable people with the name include:

== Given name ==
=== Mushtak ===
- Mushtak Al-Atabi (born 1970), Iraqi academic
- Mushtak Ali Kazi (1917–2002), Pakistani jurist and writer

=== Mushtaq ===
- Mushtaq Ahmad (field hockey, born 1956) (born 1956), Pakistani field hockey player
- Mushtaq Ahmad (Scottish politician) (1942–2024), British politician
- Mushtaq Ahmed (cricketer) (born 1970), Pakistani cricket player and coach
- Mushtaq Ahmed (field hockey, born 1932) (1932–2011), Pakistani field hockey player
- Mushtaq Ahmed (Pakistani politician), Pakistani Army officer and politician
- Mushtaq Ahmed (writer) (1967–2021), Bangladeshi dissident, writer, and entrepreneur
- Mushtaq Ali (1914–2005), Indian cricketer
- Mushtaq Ahmed Azmi (1919–2011), Indian mass literacy expert
- Mushtaq Ahmed Baig (1951–2008), Pakistani Army officer
- Mushtaq Bukhari (1949–2024), Indian politician
- Mushtaq Ali Cheema, Pakistani politician and industrialist
- Mushtaq Chhapra, Pakistani industrialist, philanthropist, and diplomat
- Mushtaq Gazdar (1937–2000), Pakistani cinematographer
- Mushtaq Ahmed Ghani (born 1956), Pakistani politician
- Mushtaq Ahmed Gurmani (1905–1981), Pakistani politician
- Mushtaq Guroo, Indian politician and business tycoon
- Mushtaq Hussain, Pakistani politician
- Mushtaq Jalili (1927–2004), Indian screenwriter
- Mushtaq Kak (1961–2023), Indian actor
- Mushtaq Khan (1969/70–2026), Indian actor and comedian
- Mushtaq Khan (economist) (born 1961), British-Bangladeshi economist
- Mushtaq Ahmad Khan (born 1974), Pakistani politician
- Mushtaq Ali Khan (1911–1989), Indian musician
- Mushtaq Hussain Khan (1878–1964), Indian classical vocalist
- Mushtaq Leghari, Pakistani Army officer and diplomat
- Mushtaq Ahmad Lone (1958–2002), Indian politician
- Mushtaq Ahmad Mahar, Pakistani civil servant and police officer
- Mushtaq Minhas (born 1970), Pakistani journalist
- Mushtaq Mohammad (born 1943), Pakistani cricketer
- Mushtaq Ahmad Mushtaq (born 1961), Indian writer, broadcaster, and journalist
- Mushtaq Pahalgami (born 1979), Indian social activist and environmentalist
- Mushtaq Talib Al-Saeedi (1980–2024), Iraqi militant
- Mushtaq Ahmad Shah (born 1955), Indian politician
- Mushtaq Ali Shah (died 1792), Iranian mystic and musician
- Mushtaq Shiekh, Indian screenwriter, author, producer, and actor
- Mushtaq Omar Uddin (born 1973), English musician
- Mushtaq Ahmad Yusufi (1923–2018), Pakistani satirist and humorist
- Mushtaq Ahmed Zargar (born 1967), Indian separatist leader and militant

== Surname ==
- Khadija Mushtaq (1974–2025), Pakistani academic administrator and educator
- Saqlain Mushtaq (born 1976), Pakistani cricketer
