= Muhammad Ijaz Virk =

Pakistani politician

Member of the National Assembly of Pakistan
- In office 16 March 2008 – 17 March 2013
- Preceded by: Mushtaaq Ali Cheema
- Succeeded by: Mian Abdul Manan
- Constituency: NA-83 (Faisalabad-IX)
- Majority: 1,049 (0.75%)

Chaudhry Muhammad Ijaz Virk is a Pakistani politician who had been a member of the National Assembly of Pakistan from March 2008 to March 2013.

== Political career ==
He ran for the seat of the National Assembly of Pakistan from Constituency NA-83 (Faisalabad-IX) as a candidate of Pakistan Peoples Party (PPP) in the 2002 Pakistani general election but was unsuccessful. He received 37,431 votes and lost the seat to Mushtaq Ali Cheema, a candidate of Pakistan Muslim League (Q) (PML-Q).

He was elected to the National Assembly from Constituency NA-83 (Faisalabad-IX) as a candidate of PPP in the 2008 Pakistani general election. He obtained 56,910 votes and defeated Mian Abdul Manan.

In 2013, he joined Pakistan Muslim League (N) (PML-N) after PPP refused to allot him ticket to contest in the 2013 Pakistani general election.
