= Seela =

Seela may refer to:

- Haji Ismael Seela (born 1946), Pakistani politician
- Max Seela (1911–1999), Nazi German Waffen-SS officer
- Seela Gurung (born c. 1993), contestant on the Nepalese television show Mega Model
- Seela Misra (fl. 1994–present), Canadian-born American singer-songwriter
- Seela Sella (born 1936), Finnish film actress
- Seela, the bass guitarist of the Japanese rock band D'erlanger
- Seela, in the Ethiopian Orthodox Church's books of Meqabyan one of five brothers martyred for leading a guerrilla war against Antiochus Epiphanes
- Seela, a polar bear cub who was a subject of the 2007 American documentary Arctic Tale

== See also ==
- Seela Sing'isi, an administrative ward in the Meru District of the Arusha Region of Tanzania
