= Mian Tahir Pervaz =

Pakistani politician

Honourable Mian Muhammad Tahir Pervaz MPA

Member of the Provincial Assembly of the Punjab
- Incumbent
- Assumed office 28 November 2025
- Preceded by: Sheikh Shahid Javed
- Constituency: PP-115 Faisalabad-XVIII
- In office 15 August 2018 – 14 January 2023
- Succeeded by: Sheikh Shahid Javed
- Constituency: PP-112 Faisalabad-XVI
- In office 29 May 2013 – 31 May 2018
- Preceded by: Khalid Imtiaz Khan Baluch
- Constituency: PP-69 (Faisalabad-XIX)

Personal details
- Party: PMLN (2013-present)

Mian Muhammad Tahir Pervaiz, is a Pakistani politician and businessman who has been a member of the Provincial Assembly of the Punjab since 28 November 2025, representing Faisalabad.

Previously, he held the same position from June 2013 to January 2023.

== Early life and education ==
He was born on 4 June 1979 in Faisalabad.

He received intermediate level education from Government College University.

== Political career ==
He was elected to the Provincial Assembly of the Punjab as a candidate of Pakistan Muslim League (N) (PML-N) from Constituency PP-69 (Faisalabad-XIX) in the 2013 Pakistani general election.

He was elected to the Provincial Assembly of the Punjab as a candidate of PML-N from Constituency PP-112 (Faisalabad-XVI) in the 2018 Pakistani general election. His term ended on 14 January 2023 when the assembly was dissolved.

In the 2025 Pakistani by-elections, Pervaiz was elected from PP-115 Faisalabad-XVIII as a PML-N candidate. He secured 49,046 votes according to unofficial results. The seat became vacant due to the disqualification of the previous member following convictions related to the 2023 riots.
