= Chaudhry Latif Nazar Gujjar =

Pakistani politician

Member of the Provincial Assembly of the Punjab
- Incumbent
- Assumed office 23 February 2024
- Constituency: PP-114 Faisalabad-XVIII
- In office 15 August 2018 – 14 January 2023

Personal details
- Born: July 23, 1960 (age 65) Faisalabad, Punjab, Pakistan
- Party: PTI (2013-present)

Chaudhry Latif Nazar Gujjar (born 23 July 1960) is a Pakistani politician who had been a member of the Provincial Assembly of the Punjab from August 2018 till January 2023 and Provincial minister of Punjab from August 2022 till January 2023. He has also served as Chairman Faisalabad Development Authority (FDA) from 2 September 2020 to 20 July 2022.

== Political career ==
He ran for the seat in the Provincial Assembly of the Punjab as a candidate of the Pakistan Tehreek-e-Insaf (PTI) from PP-68 (Faisalabad-XVIII) in the 2013 Punjab provincial election. He was defeated by Sheikh Ijaz Ahmad of PMLN by a heavy margin of 18,534 votes.

He was elected to the Provincial Assembly of the Punjab as a candidate of the Pakistan Tehreek-e-Insaf (PTI) from PP-114 (Faisalabad-XVIII) in the 2018 Punjab provincial election.

He was inducted in to the cabinet of Chief Minister Chaudhry Pervaiz Elahi on 7 August 2022. He took oath as minister of Mines and Minerals.

He ran for a seat in the Provincial Assembly from PP-113 Faisalabad-XVII as a candidate of the PTI in the 2024 Punjab provincial election.
