= Muhammad Waris Aziz =

Pakistani politician

President of IPP Faisalabad
- In office 5 October 2023 – 29 February 2024
- Succeeded by: Farrukh Habib

Additional General Secretary IPP Faisalabad Division
- Incumbent
- Assumed office 1 March 2024
- Preceded by: Farrukh Habib

Member of the Provincial Assembly of the Punjab
- In office 15 August 2018 – 14 January 2023
- Preceded by: Rana Sanaullah
- Succeeded by: Muhammad Ismael Seela
- Constituency: PP-113 Faisalabad-XVII

Muhammad Waris Aziz is a Pakistani politician who had been a member of the Provincial Assembly of the Punjab from August 2018 till January 2023, defeating Rana Sanaullah. Waris became the chairman of PHA, Faisalabad in 2020

== Early life ==
Mian Waris Aziz, son of Mr Abdul Aziz, was born on 21 December 1967 at Faisalabad and is an Intermediate from Degree College, Faisalabad.

== Political career ==
He contested the MPA seat of Provincial Assembly of the Punjab as a candidate of Pakistan Tehreek-e-Insaf from Constituency PP-70 (Faisalabad-XVIII) in the 2013 Pakistani general election. He was defeated by Rana Sana Ullah Khan of PMLN by a heavy margin of 51,322 votes.

He was elected to the Provincial Assembly of the Punjab as a candidate of Pakistan Tehreek-e-Insaf from Constituency PP-113 (Faisalabad-XVII) in the 2018 Pakistani general election.
