= Shakeel Shahid =

Pakistani politician

Member of the Provincial Assembly of the Punjab
- In office 15 August 2018 – 14 January 2023
- Constituency: PP-111 Faisalabad-XV

Personal details
- Party: PTI (2018-present)
- Parent: Muhammad Riaz Shahid (father)

Shakeel Shahid is a Pakistani politician who has been a member of the Provincial Assembly of the Punjab from August 2018 till January 2023.

He is son of Former Mayor of Faisalabad, Muhammad Riaz Shahid who also served as MPA.

== Political career ==
He contested on the MPA seat of Provincial Assembly of the Punjab as a candidate of Pakistan Peoples Party from Constituency PP-66 (Faisalabad-XV) in the 2013 Pakistani general election. He was defeated by Haji Khalid Saeed of PMLN by a heavy margin of 35,322 Votes.

He was elected to the Provincial Assembly of the Punjab as a candidate of Pakistan Tehreek-e-Insaf from Constituency PP-111 (Faisalabad-XV) in the 2018 Pakistani general election.
