= Raza Nasrullah Ghumman =

Pakistani politician

Member of the National Assembly of Pakistan
- In office 13 August 2018 – 25 January 2023
- Constituency: NA-105 (Faisalabad-V)

Member of the Provincial Assembly of the Punjab
- In office 2008 – 31 May 2018

Personal details
- Born: 10 March 1955 (age 71) Lahore, Punjab, Pakistan
- Party: PML(Z) (2025-present)
- Other political affiliations: IPP (2023-2025); PTI (2018–2023); PMLN (2008–2018); PML(Q) (2005–2008); PPP (2002–2005)

Chaudhry Raza Nasrullah Ghumman is a Pakistani politician who had been a member of the National Assembly of Pakistan from August 2018 till January 2023. Previously he was a Member of the Provincial Assembly of the Punjab, from 2008 to May 2018.

== Early life and education ==
He was born on 10 March 1955 in Lahore.

== Political career ==
He ran for the seat of the National Assembly of Pakistan as a candidate of Pakistan Peoples Party (PPP) from Constituency NA-80 (Faisalabad-VI) in the 2002 Pakistani general election but was unsuccessful. He received 40,264 votes and lost the seat

He was elected to the Provincial Assembly of the Punjab as a candidate of Pakistan Muslim League (N) (PML-N) from Constituency PP-62 (Faisalabad-XII) in the 2008 Pakistani general election. He received 31,742 votes and defeated Rai Ahsan Raza Khara, a candidate of Pakistan Muslim League (Q) (PML-Q). In the same election, he also ran for the seat of the National Assembly as an independent candidate from Constituency NA-77 (Faisalabad-III) but was unsuccessful. He received 55 votes and lost the seat to Muhammad Asim Nazir.

He was re-elected to the Provincial Assembly of the Punjab as a candidate of PML-N from Constituency PP-62 (Faisalabad-XII) in the 2013 Pakistani general election. He received 53,406 votes and defeated Chaudhry Ali Akhter Khan of PMLQ, a candidate of PML-Q. In the same election, he also ran for the seat of the National Assembly as an independent candidate from Constituency NA-80 (Faisalabad-VI) but was unsuccessful. He received 5,905 votes and lost the seat to Mian Muhammad Farooq.

In March 2018, he quit Pakistan Muslim League (N) and joined Pakistan Tehreek-e-Insaf (PTI).

He was re-elected to the National Assembly as a candidate of PTI from Constituency NA-105 (Faisalabad-V) in 2018 Pakistani general election.

== More Reading ==
- List of members of the 15th National Assembly of Pakistan
