= NA-101 Faisalabad-VII =

Constituency of the National Assembly of Pakistan

- Constituency for the National Assembly of Pakistan
- Region: Faislabad City area of Faisalabad District
- Electorate: 535,081

Current constituency
- Party: Pakistan Tehreek-e-Insaf
- Member: Rana Atif
- Created from: NA-84 Faisalabad-X

NA-101 Faisalabad-VII (این اے-101، فیصل آباد-7) is a constituency for the National Assembly of Pakistan.

== Members of Parliament ==
=== 2018–2022: NA-109 Faisalabad-IX ===
Election	Member	Party
2018	Faiz Ullah Kamoka	PTI

=== 2024–present: NA-101 Faisalabad-VIII ===
Election	Member	Party
2024	Rana Atif	PTI

== Election 2002 ==
General elections were held on 10 October 2002. Haji Muhammad Fazal Karim of PML-N won by 37,049 votes.

General election 2002: NA-82 Faisalabad-VIII
Party	Candidate	Votes	%	±%
PML(N)	Sahibzada Muhammad Fazal Karim	37,049	35.35	
PPP	Nisar Akbar Khan	36,288	34.63	
PML(Q)	Syed Nasir Ali Shah	18,214	17.38	
MMA	Sardar Zafar Hussain Khan	11,460	10.94	
Others	Others (four candidates)	1,790	1.70	
Turnout		106,513	39.88	
Total valid votes		104,801	98.39	
Rejected ballots		1,712	1.61	
Majority		761	0.72	
Registered electors		267,093		

== Election 2008 ==
General elections were held on 18 February 2008. Haji Muhammad Fazal Karim of PML-N won by 62,889 votes.

General election 2008: NA-82 Faisalabad-VIII
Party	Candidate	Votes	%	±%
PML(N)	Sahibzada Muhammad Fazal Karim	62,889	47.34	
PPP	Aezid Mahmood Khan	55,073	41.45	
PML(Q)	Rana Zahid Mahmood	14,609	11.00	
Others	Others (three candidates)	282	0.21	
Turnout		135,092	47.04	
Total valid votes		132,853	98.34	
Rejected ballots		2,239	1.66	
Majority		7,816	5.89	
Registered electors		287,186		
PML(N) hold				

== Election 2013 ==
General elections were held on 11 May 2013. Rana Muhammad Afzal Khan of PML-N won by 126,349 votes and became the member of National Assembly.

General election 2013: NA-82 Faisalabad-VIII
Party	Candidate	Votes	%	±%
PML(N)	Rana Muhammad Afzal Khan	126,426	63.03	
PTI	Nisar Akbar Khan	36,465	18.18	
SIC	Sahibzada Hamid Raza	27,661	13.79	
Others	Others (nineteen candidates)	10,021	5.00	
Turnout		203,378	59.18	
Total valid votes		200,573	98.62	
Rejected ballots		2,805	1.33	
Majority		89,961	44.85	
Registered electors		343,634		
PML(N) hold				

== Election 2018 ==
General elections were held on 25 July 2018.

General election 2018: NA-109 Faisalabad-IX
Party	Candidate	Votes	%	±%
PTI	Faiz Ullah Kamoka	122,905	51.26	
PML(N)	Mian Abdul Manan	94,476	39.40	
Others	Others (eight candidates)	22,388	9.34	
Turnout		244,241	58.05	
Total valid votes		239,769	98.17	
Rejected ballots		4,472	1.83	
Majority		28,429	11.86	
Registered electors		420,767		
PTI gain from PML(N)				

== Election 2024 ==
General elections were held on 8 February 2024. Rana Atif, an independent candidate supported by PTI won with 134,886 votes.

General election 2024: NA-101 Faisalabad-VII
Party	Candidate	Votes	%	±%
PTI	Rana Atif (Note: Filed nomination papers as PTI candidate but ECP allowed him to run as an Independent)	134,886	52.06	▲0.80
PML(N)	Irfan Ahmed	89,612	34.59	▼4.81
TLP	Muhammad Asad Iqbal	11,445	4.42	▲0.26
Others	Others (thirty candidates)	23,161	8.94	▲3.76
Valid ballots		259,104	97.43	
Rejected ballots		6,826	2.57	
Turnout		265,930	49.68	▼8.37
Majority		45,274	17.47	▲5.61
Registered electors		535,081		

== See also ==
- NA-100 Faisalabad-VI
- NA-102 Faisalabad-VIII
