= Nisar Ahmad Jutt =

Pakistani politician (born 1975)

- نثاراحمد جٹ

Member of the National Assembly of Pakistan
- Incumbent
- Assumed office 29 February 2024
- Preceded by: Rana Sanaullah
- Constituency: NA-100 Faisalabad-VI
- Majority: 19,329 (%7.03)
- In office 1 June 2013 – 31 May 2018
- Preceded by: Chaudhry Saeed Iqbal
- Succeeded by: Rana Sanaullah
- Constituency: NA-81 (Faisalabad-VII)
- Majority: 58,855 (%34.78)
- In office 2002–2007
- Preceded by: Constituency Established
- Succeeded by: Chaudhry Saeed Iqbal
- Constituency: NA-81 (Faisalabad-VII)
- Majority: 81,860 (%39.60)

District President of PTI NA-100
- Incumbent
- Assumed office 20 May 2024

Personal details
- Born: 9 March 1975 (age 51)
- Party: PTI (2018-present)
- Other political affiliations: PMLN (2013-2018); PML(Q) (2008-2013); Pakistan Peoples Party Patriots (2004-2008); PPP (2002-2004)

Nisar Ahmad Jutt (Urdu: نثار احمد جٹ; born 9 March 1975) is a Pakistani politician and agriculturalist who is a member of the National Assembly of Pakistan since 29 February 2024.

== Early life and education ==
He was born on 9 March 1975. Nisar hails from a politically active family; his uncle Chaudhary Mohammad Ilyas served as Member of the Provincial Assembly (MPA) from Faisalabad. Continuing the family tradition, he pursued a career in politics.

He began his education at Cadet College Petaro in 1986, joining in seventh grade, and completed his intermediate studies there in 1992. He later enrolled at Liaquat University of Medical and Health Sciences (LUMHS), Jamshoro, where he earned his MBBS degree in 1998. In 2001, he completed Part I of his specialization in Urology.

== Political career ==
=== Early career ===
He was elected to the National Assembly of Pakistan as a candidate of Pakistan Peoples Party (PPP) from Constituency NA-81 (Faisalabad-VII) in the 2002 Pakistani general election. He received 58,855 votes and defeated a candidate of Pakistan Muslim League (Q) (PML-Q). In 2008, he quit PPP and joined PML-Q.

He ran for the seat of the National Assembly as a candidate of PML-Q from Constituency NA-81 (Faisalabad-VII) in the 2008 Pakistani general election but was unsuccessful. He received 55,646 votes and lost the seat to Chaudhry Saeed Iqbal, a candidate of PPP.

=== Pakistan Muslim League (N) (2013-2018) ===
In 2013, he quit PML-Q and joined Pakistan Muslim League (N) (PML-N).

He was re-elected to the National Assembly as a candidate of PML-N from Constituency NA-81 (Faisalabad-VII) in the 2013 Pakistani general election. He received 122,059 votes and defeated Chaudhry Saeed Iqbal.

In October 2017, he was appointed as Federal Parliamentary Secretary for Human Rights.

He announced to resign from his National Assembly seat in protest in December 2017.

=== Pakistan Tehreek-e-Insaf (PTI) (2018-present) ===
In March 2018, he quit PML-N and joined Pakistan Tehreek-e-Insaf (PTI).

He ran for the seat of the National Assembly as a candidate of PTI from Constituency NA-106 (Faisalabad-VI) in the 2018 Pakistani general election but was unsuccessful. He received 103,799 votes and was defeated by Rana Sana Ullah Khan, a candidate of PML(N).

He was re-elected to the National Assembly from NA-100 Faisalabad-VI as an independent candidate supported by PTI in the 2024 Pakistani general election. He received 131,980 votes and defeated Rana Sanaullah Khan, a candidate of PML(N).
