= Haji Ismael Seela =

Pakistani politician (born 1946)

Honourable Haji Muhammad Ismael Seela MPA

Member of the Provincial Assembly of the Punjab
- In office 23 February 2024 – 25 August 2025
- Preceded by: Muhammad Waris Aziz
- Succeeded by: Ahmad Shehryar
- Constituency: PP-116 Faisalabad-XIX
- In office 1993–1996
- Preceded by: Chaudhary Sher Ali
- Succeeded by: Rana Sanaullah
- Constituency: PP-59 Faisalabad-XIX

Personal details
- Born: 1 January 1946 (age 80) Ludhiana, Punjab, British India
- Party: PTI (2022-present) PPP (1997-2022)
- Other political affiliations: IND (1988-1992)
- Parent: Muhammad Ibraheem Zainab Bibi Hajarah Bibi (Step-Mother)

Punjab Assembly Lahore

Muhammad Ismael Seela (born 1 January 1946) is a Pakistani politician who served as Member of the Provincial Assembly of the Punjab from 2024 to September 2025. Previously served as Member from August 1993 to till 1996.

He was de-seated on 2 September 2025 under Article 63(1)(h) of the Constitution of Islamic Republic of Pakistan.

He also served as Member of Human Rights and Minorities Affairs committee. He is active in politics since 1988, he many times party separate in general elections, but win only two elections, the reason is, from 1980s PML(N) has very stronghold in Faisalabad and he is from PPP, his party never have majority to win general or bye elections, accept 1993, 2002 and 2008. (Note: I will add citation I will finding but all detail are actual) In 1993, he defeated PML(N) candidate Rana Sanaullah in 1993 by elections, He also join PML(N) after winning the elections.

== Early life ==
He was born on 1 January 1946 at Ludhiana,India.

== Suspension ==
On 28 June 2025, Ismael was among 26 members of the opposition who were suspended from the Punjab Assembly for 15 sittings. The action was taken by Speaker Malik Muhammad Ahmed Khan following a disruption during Chief Minister Maryam Nawaz's address. The suspended lawmakers were accused of disorderly conduct, including chanting slogans, tearing official documents, and surrounding the speaker’s dais. The speaker also forwarded references against the suspended members to the Election Commission of Pakistan for further action.

But، Later suspension was restored.

== Political career ==
He was elected to the Provincial Assembly of the Punjab as an Independent candidate from constituency PP-59 Faisalabad-XIX in the 1988 Pakistani general election.

He was elected to the Provincial Assembly of the Punjab as an Independent candidate from constituency PP-59 Faisalabad-XIX in the 1990 Pakistani general election.

He was elected to the Provincial Assembly of the Punjab as an Independent candidate from constituency PP-59 Faisalabad-XIX in the 1993 Pakistani general election.

He was elected to the Provincial Assembly of the Punjab as a Pakistan Tehreek-e-Insaf candidate from constituency PP-59 Faisalabad-XIX in the 1997 Pakistani general election.

He was elected to the Provincial Assembly of the Punjab as a Pakistan Tehreek-e-Insaf candidate from constituency PP-70 Faisalabad-XIX in the 2002 Pakistani general election.

He was elected to the Provincial Assembly of the Punjab as a Pakistan Tehreek-e-Insaf candidate from constituency PP-70 Faisalabad-XIX in the 2008 Pakistani general election.

He was elected to the Provincial Assembly of the Punjab as a Pakistan Tehreek-e-Insaf candidate from constituency PP-70 Faisalabad-XIX in the 2013 Pakistani general election.

He was elected to the Provincial Assembly of the Punjab as a Pakistan Tehreek-e-Insaf candidate from constituency PP-113 Faisalabad-XIX in the 2018 Pakistani general election.

He was elected to the Provincial Assembly of the Punjab as a Pakistan Tehreek-e-Insaf-backed independent candidate from constituency PP-116 Faisalabad-XIX in the 2024 Pakistani general election.
