= NA-103 Faisalabad-IX =

Constituency of the National Assembly of Pakistan

- Constituency for the National Assembly of Pakistan
- Region: Faislabad City area of Faisalabad District
- Electorate: 544,638

Current constituency
- Party: Pakistan Tehreek-e-Insaf
- Member: Muhammad Ali Sarfraz
- Created from: NA-83 Faisalabad-IX

NA-103 Faisalabad-IX (این اے-103، فیصل آباد-۹) is a constituency for the National Assembly of Pakistan.

== Members of Parliament ==
=== 2018–2023: NA-107 Faisalabad-VII ===
Election	Member	Party
2018	Khurram Shehzad	PTI

=== 2024–present: NA-103 Faisalabad-IX ===
Election	Member	Party
2024	Muhammad Ali Sarfraz	PTI

== Election 2002 ==
General elections were held on 10 October 2002. Mushtaaq Ali Cheema of PML-Q won by 38,278 votes.

General election 2002: NA-83 Faisalabad-IX
Party	Candidate	Votes	%	±%
PML(Q)	Mushtaaq Ali Cheema	38,278	36.66	
PPP	Ch. Muhammad Ijaz Virk	37,431	35.85	
PML(N)	Mian Irfan Ahmad	24,111	23.09	
NA	Mian Zahid Anwar	2,347	2.25	
Others	Others (six candidates)	2,236	2.15	
Turnout		105,956	37.45	
Total valid votes		104,403	98.53	
Rejected ballots		1,553	1.47	
Majority		847	0.81	
Registered electors		282,919		

== Election 2008 ==
General elections were held on 18 February 2008. Muhammad Ijaz Virk of Pakistan Peoples Party Parliamentarian (PPPP) won by 56,910 votes.

General election 2008: NA-83 Faisalabad-IX
Party	Candidate	Votes	%	±%
PPP	Ch. Muhammad Ijaz Virk	56,910	40.61	
PML(N)	Mian Abdul Mannan	55,861	39.86	
PML(Q)	Mushtaq Ali Cheema	26,599	18.98	
Others	Others (five candidates)	775	0.55	
Turnout		143,204	45.96	
Total valid votes		140,145	97.86	
Rejected ballots		3,059	2.14	
Majority		1,049	0.75	
Registered electors		311,576		
PPP gain from PML(Q)				

== Election 2013 ==
Election Proceedings Terminated under section 18 of the Representation of the people Act 1976 due to the death of a contesting Candidate.

== By-election 2013 ==
A by-election was held on 22 August 2013 and Mian Abdul Manan of PML(N) won the election with 47,107 votes, defeating Faiz Ullah Kamoka of Pakistan Tehreek-e-Insaf (PTI).

By-election 2013: NA-83 Faisalabad-IX
Party	Candidate	Votes	%	±%
PML(N)	Mian Abdul Manan	47,107	49.82	
PTI	Faiz Ullah Kamoka	36,866	38.99	
PPP	Mumtaz Ali Cheema	9,942	10.51	
Others	Others (eight candidates)	646	0.68	
Turnout		94,561	25.67	
Total valid votes		94,561	100	
Rejected ballots		0	0	
Majority		10,241	10.83	
Registered electors		368,372		
PML(N) gain from PPP				

== Election 2018 ==
General elections were held on 25 July 2018.

General election 2018: NA-107 Faisalabad-VII
Party	Candidate	Votes	%	±%
PTI	Khurram Shehzad	126,441	51.41	
PML(N)	Akram Ansari	102,159	41.54	
Others	Others (five candidates)	17,350	7.05	
Turnout		249,294	57.52	
Total valid votes		245,950	98.66	
Rejected ballots		3,344	1.34	
Majority		24,282	9.87	
Registered electors		433,402		

== Election 2024 ==
General elections were held on 8 February 2024. Muhammad Ali Sarfraz won the election with 147,987 votes.

General election 2024: NA-103 Faisalabad-IX
Party	Candidate	Votes	%	±%
PTI	Muhammad Ali Sarfraz (Note: Filed nomination papers as PTI candidate but ECP allowed him to run as an Independent)	147,987	56.78	▲5.37
PML(N)	Akram Ansari	86,683	33.26	▼8.28
Others	Others (forty-three candidates)	25,963	9.96	
Turnout		264,293	48.53	▼8.99
Total valid votes		260,633	98.62	
Rejected ballots		3,660	1.38	
Majority		61,304	23.52	▲13.65
Registered electors		544,638		

== See also ==
- NA-102 Faisalabad-VIII
- NA-104 Faisalabad-X
