= PP-118 Faisalabad-XXI =

Constituency of the Punjabi Provincial Legislature, Pakistan

- Constituency for the Provincial Assembly of Punjab
- Region: Faisalabad city area in Faisalabad District

Current constituency
- Created from: PP-72 Faisalabad-XXII (2002-2018); PP-110 Faisalabad-XIV (2018-2023)

PP-118 Faisalabad-XXI (پی پی-118، فیصل آباد-21) is a Constituency of Provincial Assembly of Punjab.

== General elections 2024 ==
Provincial election 2024: PP-117 Faisalabad-XXI
Party	Candidate	Votes	%	±%
Independent	Khayal Ahmad Kastro (Note: Filed nomination papers as PTI candidate but ECP allowed him to run as an Independent)	79,360	60.03	
PML(N)	Muhammad Razzaq Malik	40,144	30.37	
TLP	Zulfiqar Ali	4,632	3.50	
JI	Malik Meraj Ud Din	2,098	1.59	
Others	Others (thirty three candidates)	5,966	4.51	
Turnout		134,198	49.74	
Total valid votes		132,200	98.51	
Rejected ballots		1,998	1.49	
Majority		39,216	29.66	
Registered electors		269,808		
hold				

== General elections 2018 ==
Provincial election 2018: PP-110 Faisalabad-XIV
Party	Candidate	Votes	%	±%
PTI	Khayal Ahmad	69,509	51.28	
PML(N)	Malik Muhammad Nawaz	58,444	43.12	
TLP	Zulfiqar Ali	5,252	3.88	
PPP	Muhammad Nadeem	1,226	0.90	
Others	Others (nine candidates)	1,122	0.82	
Turnout		137,461	60.43	
Total valid votes		135,553	98.61	
Rejected ballots		1,908	1.39	
Majority		11,065	8.16	
Registered electors		227,455		

== General elections 2013 ==
Provincial election 2013: PP-72 Faisalabad-XXII
Party	Candidate	Votes	%	±%
PML(N)	Khawaja Muhammad Islam	53,899	62.94	
PTI	Sheikh Salman Arif	22,003	25.70	
PPP	Nazia Shakeel	5,130	5.99	
JI	Muhammad Afzaal Shaheen	2,850	3.33	
Others	Others (twenty five candidates)	1,748	2.04	
Turnout		86,394	61.12	
Total valid votes		85,630	99.12	
Rejected ballots		764	0.88	
Majority		31,896	37.24	
Registered electors		141,359		

== General elections 2008 ==
Contesting candidates	Party affiliation	Votes polled

== See also ==
- PP-117 Faisalabad-XX
- PP-119 Toba Tek Singh-I
