= PP-116 Faisalabad-XIX =

Constituency of the Punjabi Provincial Legislature, Pakistan

- Constituency for the Provincial Assembly of Punjab
- Region: Faisalabad city area in Faisalabad District

Current constituency
- Member: Ahmad Shehryar MPA-elect
- Created from: PP-113 Faisalabad-XVII (2018-2023); PP-70 Faisalabad-XX (2002-2018)

PP-116 Faisalabad-XIX (پی پی-116، فیصل آباد-19) is a Constituency of Provincial Assembly of Punjab.

== By-election 2025 ==
By election was held on 23 November 2025, due to disqualification of previous Member Muhammad Ismael Seela.

Rana Ahmad Shehryar Khan, was elected as Member of the Provincial Assembly of Punjab (MPA).

By-election 2025: PP-116 (Faisalabad-XIX)
Party	Candidate	Votes	%	±%
PML(N)	Ahmad Shehryar	48,824	77.87	
Independent	Malik Asghar Ali Qaisar	11,429	18.23	
Independent	Khawaja Asad Ijaz	1,158	1.85	
Others	Others (four candidates)	1,287	2.05	
Turnout		63,471	22.94	
Total valid votes		62,698	98.78	
Rejected ballots		773	1.22	
Majority		37,395	59.64	
Registered electors		276,687		
gain from				

== General elections 2024 ==
Provincial election 2024: PP-116 Faisalabad-XIX
Party	Candidate	Votes	%	±%
Independent	Muhammad Ismael Seela (Note: Filed nomination papers as PTI candidate but ECP allowed him to run as an Independent)	67,428	51.44	
PML(N)	Rana Ahmad Sheheryar Khan	52,517	40.06	
TLP	Zahid Mahmood Khan	4,370	3.33	
JI	Taha Khan	2,266	1.73	
Others	Others (twenty six candidates)	4,504	3.44	
Turnout		133,065	50.18	
Total valid votes		131,085	98.51	
Rejected ballots		1,980	1.49	
Majority		14,911	11.38	
Registered electors		265,168		
hold				

== General elections 2018 ==
Provincial election 2018: PP-113 Faisalabad-XVII
Party	Candidate	Votes	%	±%
PTI	Muhammad Waris Aziz	61,094	47.38	
PML(N)	Rana Sana Ullah Khan	56,079	43.49	
TLP	Muhammad Farooq Ul Hassan	3,641	2.82	
AAT	Muhammad Zafar Iqbal	2,046	1.59	
MMA	Makhdoom Zada Syed Muhammad Zakaria Shah	1,604	1.24	
PPP	Mubashar Nazir	1,554	1.21	
Others	Others (ten candidates)	4,741	2.27	
Turnout		130,571	58.22	
Total valid votes		128,959	98.77	
Rejected ballots		1,612	1.23	
Majority		5,015	3.89	
Registered electors		224,265		

== General elections 2013 ==
General election are held on 11 May 2013, and PML(N)'s Rana Sanaullah Khan was elected.

Provincial election 2013 : PP-70 Faisalabad-XX
Party	Candidate	Votes	%	±%
PML(N)	Rana Sana Ullah Khan	56,694	59.89	
PTI	Chaudhry Muhammad Waris Aziz	24,607	25.99	
PPP	Malik Fayyaz Ahmad Seela	8,062	8.52	
Independent	Doctor Muhammad Ashiq Rehmani	1,736	1.83	
JI	Sardar Zafar Hussain Khan	1,361	1.44	
Others	Others (fourteen candidates)	2,205	2.33	
Turnout		96,022	61.75	
Total valid votes		94,665	98.59	
Rejected ballots		1,357	1.41	
Majority		32,087	33.90	
Registered electors		155,507		

== General elections 2008 ==
Contesting candidates	Party affiliation	Votes polled

== See also ==
- PP-115 Faisalabad-XVIII
- PP-117 Faisalabad-XX
- PP-70 Faisalabad-XIX
