= NA-99 Faisalabad-V =

Constituency of the National Assembly of Pakistan

- Constituency for the National Assembly of Pakistan
- Region: Faisalabad Sadar Tehsil (partly) including Dijkot city of Faisalabad District
- Electorate: 491,437

Current constituency
- Party: Pakistan Tehreek-e-Insaf
- Member: Malik Umar Farooq Mushtaq
- Created from: NA-80 Faisalabad-IV

NA-99 Faisalabad-V (این اے-99، فیصل آباد-۵) is a constituency for the National Assembly of Pakistan.

== Members of Parliament ==
=== 2018–2023: NA-105 Faisalabad-V ===
Election	Member	Party
2018	Chaudhry Raza Nasrullah Ghumman	PTI

=== 2024–present: NA-99 Faisalabad-V ===
Election	Member	Party
2024	Malik Umar Farooq Mushtaq	PTI

== Election 2002 ==
General elections were held on 10 October 2002. Rana Asif Tauseef of PML-N won by 43,547 votes.

General election 2002: NA-80 Faisalabad-VI
Party	Candidate	Votes	%	±%
PML(N)	Asif Tauseef	43,547	34.35	
PML(Q)	Sardar Dildar Ahmad Cheema	41,947	33.09	
PPP	Raza Nasrullah Ghuman	40,264	31.77	
Others	Others (two candidates)	1,000	0.79	.
Turnout		127,962	45.55	
Total valid votes		126,758	99.06	
Rejected ballots		1,204	0.94	
Majority		1,600	1.26	
Registered electors		280,902		

== Election 2008 ==
General elections were held on 18 February 2008. Rana Asif Tauseef of PML-Q won by 74,349 votes.

General election 2008: NA-80 Faisalabad-VI
Party	Candidate	Votes	%	±%
PML(Q)	Asif Tauseef	56,724	40.84	
PML(N)	Mian Muhammad Qasim Farooq	44,927	32.35	
PPP	Mian Tariq Habib	36,970	26.62	
Independent	Ch. Abu Bakar Siddique Bungoo	276	0.19	
Turnout		142,793	54.86	
Total valid votes		138,897	97.27	
Rejected ballots		3,896	2.73	
Majority		11,797	8.49	
Registered electors		260,300		
PML(Q) gain from PML(N)				

== Election 2013 ==
General elections were held on 11 May 2013. Mian Muhammad Farooq of PML-N won by 96,039 votes and became the member of National Assembly of Pakistan.

General election 2013: NA-80 Faisalabad-VI
Party	Candidate	Votes	%	±%
PML(N)	Mian Muhammad Farooq	96,039	48.48	
PML(Q)	Asif Tauseef	54,427	27.48	
Independent	Mian Muhammad Naeem	25,015	12.63	
Independent	Khalid Rafee Cheema	12,924	6.52	
Others	Others (six candidates)	9,706	4.89	
Turnout		205,854	59.97	
Total valid votes		198,111	96.24	
Rejected ballots		7,743	3.76	
Majority		41,612	27.00	
Registered electors		343,277		
PML(N) gain from PML(Q)				

== Election 2018 ==
General elections were held on 25 July 2018.

General election 2018: NA-105 Faisalabad-V
Party	Candidate	Votes	%	±%
PTI	Raza Nasrullah Ghumman	77,862	31.10	
Independent	Muhammad Masood Nazir	69,211	27.65	
PML(N)	Mian Muhammad Farooq	56,540	22.58	
Others	Others (ten candidates)	37,607	15.02	
Turnout		250,355	56.84	
Rejected ballots		9,135	3.65	
Majority		8,651	3.45	
Registered electors		440,419		
PTI gain from PML(N)				

== Election 2024 ==
General elections were held on 8 February 2024. Malik Umar Farooq Mushtaq won the election with 120,797 votes.

General election 2024: NA-99 Faisalabad-V
Party	Candidate	Votes	%	±%
PTI	Malik Umar Farooq Mushtaq (Note: Filed nomination papers as PTI candidate but ECP allowed him to run as an Independent)	120,797	48.39	▲17.29
PML(N)	Muhammad Qasim Farooq	80,401	32.21	▲9.63
Others	Others (twenty-three candidates)	48,447	19.41	
Turnout		259,299	52.76	▼4.08
Total valid votes		249,645	96.28	
Rejected ballots		9,654	3.72	
Majority		49,396	16.18	▲12.73
Registered electors		491,437		

== See also ==
- NA-98 Faisalabad-IV
- NA-100 Faisalabad-VI
