= Chaudhry Saeed Iqbal =

Pakistani politician (1966–2022)

Member of the National Assembly of Pakistan
- In office 2008–2013
- Constituency: NA-81 (Faisalabad-VII)

Personal details
- Born: 30 October 1966 Faisalabad, Punjab, Pakistan
- Died: 12 December 2022 (aged 56) Faisalabad, Punjab, Pakistan

Chaudhry Saeed Iqbal (30 October 1966 – 12 December 2022) was a Pakistani politician who had been a member of the National Assembly of Pakistan from 2008 to 2013.

== Political career ==
Iqbal was elected to the National Assembly of Pakistan from Constituency NA-81 (Faisalabad-VII) as a candidate of Pakistan People's Party (PPP) in the 2008 Pakistani general election. He received 65,322 votes and defeated Nisar Ahmad Jutt.

Iqbal ran for the seat of the National Assembly from Constituency NA-81 (Faisalabad-VII) as a candidate of PPP in the 2013 Pakistani general election, but was unsuccessful. He received 40,199 votes and lost the seat to Nisar Ahmad Jutt.

== Personal life and death ==
Iqbal died from cardiac arrest in Faisalabad on 12 December 2022, at the age of 56.
