= Irfan Siddiqui =

Pakistani politician (died 2025

Raja Raja Irfan-ul-Haque Siddiqui
- عرفان الحق صدیقی

Member of the Senate of Pakistan
- In office March 2021 – 10 November 2025
- Succeeded by: Abid Sher Ali
- Constituency: Punjab Province

Personal details
- Born: Irfan-ul-Haque Siddiqui
- Died: 10 November 2025 Islamabad, Pakistan
- Party: PMLN (2014–2025)
- Education: University of the Punjab
- Occupation: Politician; Columnist
- Awards: Hilal-e-Imtiaz (2014)

Raja Irfan-ul-Haque Siddiqui (Urdu: عرفان الحق صدیقی; died 10 November 2025) was a Pakistani politician and columnist senior figure of the Pakistan Muslim League (N). He served as a member of the Senate of Pakistan representing Punjab Province from March 2021 until his death and held key roles including Parliamentary Party Leader of PML-N in the Senate and Chairman of the Senate Standing Committee on Foreign Affairs. He died on 10 November 2025 in Islamabad after a fortnight-long hospitalisation for severe respiratory complications.

== Life and career ==
Siddiqui was a member of the Pakistan Muslim League (N). He also served as special adviser on national affairs to Prime Minister of Pakistan Nawaz Sharif.

During Nawaz Sharif's second reign, Siddiqui served as the press secretary of the former President of Pakistan Rafiq Tarar.

In 2019, he was arrested and charged for allegedly violating a tenancy law. He was held in judicial remand and subsequently released on bail. The PML-N accused the police of targeting him for his association with Nawaz Sharif.

His served as a Member of the Senate of Pakistan from March 2021 until his death, representing Punjab Province, on a general seat under the Pakistan Muslim League (N). He also served as Parliamentary Party Leader of PML-N in the Senate and was Chairman of the Senate Standing Committee on Foreign Affairs.

He supported the twenty-sixth amendment to the Constitution of Pakistan.

== Writings ==
In May 2024, he published a book titled PTI and Pakistan: From Cypher to Final Call, a compilation of 56 Urdu-language columns written between April 2022 and December 2024. The columns, originally published in various newspapers, analyse the political trajectory of the Pakistan Tehreek-e-Insaf (PTI), including the alleged foreign conspiracy (the "cypher"), internal party dynamics, and the broader political crisis in Pakistan. The book spans 232 pages and was released by Aks Publishers in Lahore.

== Death ==
Siddiqui died on 10 November 2025 in Islamabad after being hospitalised 14 days earlier for respiratory complications.

== Awards ==
- Hilal-e-Imtiaz (Crescent of Excellence) Award by the President of Pakistan in 2014.
