= NA-100 Faisalabad-VI =

Constituency of the National Assembly of Pakistan

- Constituency for the National Assembly of Pakistan
- Region: Faisalabad Sadar Tehsil (partly) including Narwala town of Faisalabad District
- Electorate: 507,880

Current constituency
- Party: Pakistan Tehreek-e-Insaf
- Member: Nisar Ahmad Jutt
- Created from: NA-81 Faisalabad-VII

NA-100 Faisalabad-VI (این اے-100، فیصل آباد-6) is a constituency for the National Assembly of Pakistan.

== Member of Parliament ==
=== 1970–1977: NW-54 Layallpur-VI ===
| Election | Member | Party |
|---|---|---|
| 1970 | Rai Hafeez Ullah Khan | PPP |

=== 1977–1988: NA-74 Faisalabad-VII ===
| Election | Member | Party |
|---|---|---|
| 1977 | Chaudhary Imtiaz Ahmad Gill | PPP |
| 1985 | Muhammad Bashir Randhawa | N/A |

=== 1988–1990: NA-63 Faisalabad-VII ===
| Election | Member | Party |
|---|---|---|
| 1988 | Nisar Akbar Khan | PPP |
| 1990 | Muhammad Akram Ansari | IJI |

=== 1993–1999: NA-62 Faisalabad-VII ===
| Election | Member | Party |
|---|---|---|
| 1993 | Sardar Dildar Ahmad Cheema | IJI |
| 1997 | Raja Nadir Parvaiz Khan | PML-N |

=== 2002–2018: NA-81 Faisalabad-VI ===
| Election | Member | Party |
|---|---|---|
| 2002 | Nisar Ahmed Jutt | PPP |
| 2008 | Chaudhry Saeed Iqbal | PPP |
| 2013 | Nisar Ahmed Jutt | PML-N |

=== 2018–2023: NA-106 Faisalabad-VI ===
| Election | Member | Party |
|---|---|---|
| 2018 | Rana Sanaullah Khan | PML-N |

=== 2024–present: NA-100 Faisalabad-VI ===
| Election | Member | Party |
|---|---|---|
| 2024 | Nisar Ahmed Jutt | PTI |

== List of MNAs ==
| N | Portrait | MNAs | Entered Office | Left Office |
|---|---|---|---|---|
| 1 | | Rai Hafeez Ullah Khan | 7 December 1970 | 6 March 1977 |
| 2 | | Chaudhary Imtiaz Ahmad Gill | 7 March 1977 | 5 July 1977 |
| 3 | | Muhammad Bashir Randhawa | 25 February 1985 | 29 May 1988 |
| 4 | | Nisar Akbar Khan | 2 December 1988 | 6 August 1990 |
| 5 | | Muhammad Akram Ansari | 6 November 1990 | 18 July 1993 |
| 6 | | Sardar Dildar Ahmad Cheema | 18 October 1993 | 5 November 1996 |
| 7 | | Raja Nadir Parvaiz Khan | 17 February 1997 | 12 October 1999 |
| 8 | | Nisar Ahmed Jutt | 17 November 2002 | 3 November 2007 |
| 9 | | Chaudhry Saeed Iqbal | 17 March 2008 | 16 March 2013 |
| 10 | | Nisar Ahmad Jutt | 1 June 2013 | 31 May 2018 |
| 11 | | Rana Sanaullah Khan | 13 August 2018 | 10 August 2023 |
| 12 | | Nisar Ahmad Jutt | 29 February 2014 | Incumbent |

== Election 2002 ==
General elections were held on 10 October 2002. Nisar Ahmad Jutt of Pakistan Peoples Party Parliamentarian (PPPP) won by 58,855 votes.

General election 2002: NA-81 Faisalabad-VII
| Party | Candidate | Votes | % | ±% |
|---|---|---|---|---|
| PPP | Nisar Ahmad Jutt | 58,855 | 47.31 | |
| PML(Q) | Ch. Talib Hussain | 51,125 | 41.09 | |
| PML(N) | Muhammad Shehbaz Kasana | 9,974 | 8.02 | |
| NA | Ch. Muhammad Bashir Randhawa | 4,460 | 3.58 | |
| Turnout | | 127,760 | 45.37 | |
| Total valid votes | | 124,414 | 97.38 | |
| Rejected ballots | | 3,346 | 2.62 | |
| Majority | | 7,730 | 6.22 | |
| Registered electors | | 281,593 | | |

== Election 2008 ==
General elections were held on 18 February 2008. Chaudhry Saeed Iqbal of Pakistan Peoples Party Parliamentarian (PPPP) won by 65,322 votes.

General election 2008: NA-81 Faisalabad-VII
| Party | Candidate | Votes | % | ±% |
|---|---|---|---|---|
| PPP | Chaudhry Saeed Iqbal | 65,322 | 45.12 | |
| PML(Q) | Nisar Ahmad Jutt | 55,646 | 38.43 | |
| PML(N) | Nisar Akbar Khan | 23,305 | 16.10 | |
| Others | Others (two candidates) | 517 | 0.35 | |
| Turnout | | 148,406 | 58.67 | |
| Total valid votes | | 144,790 | 97.56 | |
| Rejected ballots | | 3,616 | 2.44 | |
| Majority | | 9,676 | 6.69 | |
| Registered electors | | 252,974 | | |
| PPP hold | | | | |

== Election 2013 ==
General elections were held on 11 May 2013. Nisar Ahmad Jutt of PML-N won by 122,041 votes and became the member of National Assembly.

General election 2013: NA-81 Faisalabad-VII
| Party | Candidate | Votes | % | ±% |
|---|---|---|---|---|
| PML(N) | Nisar Ahmad Jutt | 122,059 | 59.05 | |
| PPP | Chaudhry Saeed Iqbal | 40,199 | 19.45 | |
| PTI | Jahanzaib Imtiaz Gill | 28,637 | 13.85 | |
| Others | Others (nine candidates) | 15,804 | 7.65 | |
| Turnout | | 212,523 | 61.77 | |
| Total valid votes | | 206,699 | 97.26 | |
| Rejected ballots | | 5,824 | 2.74 | |
| Majority | | 81,860 | 39.60 | |
| Registered electors | | 344,031 | | |
| PML(N) gain from PPP | | | | |

== Election 2018 ==
General elections were held on 25 July 2018.

General election 2018: NA-106 Faisalabad-VI
| Party | Candidate | Votes | % | ±% |
|---|---|---|---|---|
| PML(N) | Rana Sanaullah | 106,319 | 44.40 | |
| PTI | Nisar Ahmad Jutt | 103,799 | 43.35 | |
| Others | Others (six candidates) | 29,323 | 12.25 | |
| Turnout | | 244,816 | 58.92 | |
| Total valid votes | | 239,441 | 97.80 | |
| Rejected ballots | | 5,375 | 2.20 | |
| Majority | | 2,520 | 1.05 | |
| Registered electors | | 415,496 | | |
| PML(N) hold | | Swing | N/A | |

== Election 2024 ==
General elections were held on 8 February 2024. Nisar Ahmad Jutt won the election with 131,980 votes.

General election 2024: NA-100 Faisalabad-VI
| Party | Candidate | Votes | % | ±% |
|---|---|---|---|---|
| PTI | Nisar Ahmad Jutt (Note: Filed nomination papers as PTI candidate but ECP allowed him to run as an Independent) | 131,980 | 47.98 | ▲4.63 |
| PML(N) | Rana Sanaullah | 112,651 | 40.95 | ▼3.45 |
| Others | Others (thirteen candidates) | 30,445 | 11.07 | |
| Turnout | | 280,681 | 55.27 | ▼3.65 |
| Total valid votes | | 275,076 | 98.00 | |
| Rejected ballots | | 5,605 | 2.00 | |
| Majority | | 19,329 | 7.03 | |
| Registered electors | | 507,880 | | |

== See also ==
- NA-99 Faisalabad-V
- NA-101 Faisalabad-VII
