= Khurram Shehzad (politician) =

Pakistani politician

Member of the National Assembly of Pakistan
- In office 13 August 2018 – 10 April 2022
- Constituency: NA-107 (Faisalabad-VII)

Member of the Provincial Assembly of the Punjab
- In office October 2013 – 31 May 2018

Personal details
- Born: 4 April 1955 (age 71) Faisalabad, Punjab, Pakistan
- Party: PPP (2025-present)
- Other political affiliations: IPP (2023-2025); PTI (2013-2023)

Khurram Shehzad is a Pakistani politician who was a member of the National Assembly of Pakistan from August 2018 until April 2022. Previously he was a Member of the Provincial Assembly of the Punjab, from October 2013 to May 2018.

== Early life and education ==
He was born on 4 April 1955 in Faisalabad.

He graduated from University of the Punjab in 1983.

== Political career ==
He was elected to the Provincial Assembly of the Punjab as a candidate of Pakistan Tehreek-e-Insaf (PTI) from Constituency PP-72 (Faisalabad-XXII) in by polls held in October 2013.

He was elected to the National Assembly of Pakistan as a candidate of PTI from Constituency NA-107 (Faisalabad-VII) in the 2018 Pakistani general election. He resigned in January 2023.

== Parting ways with PTI ==
In May 2023, Sheikh Khurram Shahzad parted his ways with PTI while addressing a Press Conference.

== More Reading ==
- List of members of the 15th National Assembly of Pakistan
