= Mayor of Faisalabad =

Head of the Municipal Corporation of Faisalabad

- ناظم اعلیٰ فیصل آباد
- Faisalabad Municipal Corporation
- Incumbent; Vacant since 1 January 2022
- Member of: District Council Faisalabad
- Residence: Faisalabad, Pakistan
- Seat: District Council Faisalabad
- Appointer: Electorate of Faisalabad
- Term length: Four years
- Deputy: Deputy Mayor of Faisalabad
- Website: Official website

The Mayor of Faisalabad also called as Nazim-e-Ala Faisalabad (Urdu: ناظم اعلیٰ فیصل آباد) serves as the head of the Faisalabad Municipal Corporation (FMC), functioning as the chief executive of the city's administration. All municipal institutions are placed under the Mayor's authority.

== Faisalabad Municipal Corporation ==
Faisalabad local government is led by Faisalabad Municipal Corporation which consists of 157 union councils.

== List of mayors ==
#	Mayor	Start date	End date	Deputy mayor	Affiliation	Notes
1	Muhammad Riaz Shahid	1979	1983		PPP	
2	Chaudhary Sher Ali (1st Term)	1983	1987		PML	
3	Chaudhary Sher Ali(2nd Term)	1987	1991		PML	
4	Malik Muhammad Ashraf	1991	1993		PMLN	
5	Amir Sher Ali	1998	2001		PMLN	
6	Chaudhary Zahid Nazeer	2001	2005	Illyas Ansari	PML	Tehsil Municipal Administration (TMA)
7	Rana Zahid Tauseef	2005	2009	Mian Amjad Yaseen	PML	Alliance for restoration for Democracy(ARD)
Administrator system 2010 - 2016
8	Razzak Malik	2016	2021	Sheikh Muhammad Yousaf, Muhammad Ameen Butt and Chaudhry Abdul Ghafoor	PMLN	Punjab Local Government Act (PLGA) 2013
Administrator System implemented from January 2022 - present

== Local government elections 2015 ==
1. PML(N) (44.6%)
2. IND (40.8%)
3. PTI (11.5%)

Following are the results of the Faisalabad local government election, held on 31 October 2015.

Parties	UC
Pakistan Muslim League (N)	70
Independents	64
Pakistan Tehreek-e-Insaf	18
Pakistan Peoples Party	5
Total	157

== See also ==
- Mayor of Lahore
- Mayor of Karachi
- Mayor of Islamabad
- Mayor of Multan
