= Malik Muhammad Nawaz =

Pakistani politician (born 1964)

Member of the Provincial Assembly of the Punjab
- In office October 2002 – May 2018

Nazim Union Council 280
- In office 2001–2002

Personal details
- Born: 2 January 1964 (age 62) Faisalabad
- Party: Pakistan Muslim League (N)

Malik Muhammad Nawaz (born on 2 January 1964) is a Pakistani politician who was a Member of the Provincial Assembly of the Punjab, from 2002 to May 2018.

== Early life and education ==
He was born on 2 January 1964 in Faisalabad.

He has graduated in 1990 from University of the Punjab and has the degree of Bachelor of Arts.

== Political career ==
He was elected to the Provincial Assembly of the Punjab as a candidate of Pakistan Muslim League (N) (PML-N) from Constituency PP-71 (Faisalabad-XXI) in the 2002 Pakistani general election. He received 20,166 votes and defeated Malik Muhammad Arshad, a candidate of Muttahida Majlis-e-Amal (MMA).

He was re-elected to the Provincial Assembly of the Punjab as a candidate of PML-N from Constituency PP-71 (Faisalabad-XXI) in the 2008 Pakistani general election. He received 34,508 votes and defeated Haleem Aslam Malik, a candidate of Pakistan Peoples Party (PPP).

He was re-elected to the Provincial Assembly of the Punjab as a candidate of PML-N from Constituency PP-71 (Faisalabad-XXI) in the 2013 Pakistani general election. He received 56,007 votes and defeated an independent candidate, Malik Muhammad Din.

He contested to the Provincial Assembly of the Punjab as a candidate of PMLN from Constituency PP-110 (Faisalabad XIV) in the 2018 Pakistani general election. He was defeated by Khayal Ahmad Kastro of Pakistan Tehreek-e-Insaf.

He again contested to the Provincial Assembly of the Punjab as a candidate of PMLN from Constituency PP-116 (Faisalabad XX) in the 2024 Pakistani general election. He was defeated by Khayal Ahmad Kastro of Pakistan Tehreek-e-Insaf for the second consecutive term.
