= Malik Asghar Ali Qaisar =

Pakistani politician

Malik Asghar Ali Qaisar is a Pakistani politician who served as Member of the Punjab Assembly from 2002 to 2007.

== Early life and education ==
Malik was born on March 6, 1965 in Faisalabad. He obtained an LL.B. in 1989 and M.A. in political science in 1990 from the University of the Punjab, Lahore.

== Political career ==
He was elected to the Provincial Assembly of Punjab under Pakistan People's Party (PPP) in the 2002 Pakistani general election. He contested in 2025 but lost to PML-N's Ahmad Shehryar, who received 48,824 votes against his 11,429 votes.
