= Mian Muhammad Farooq =

Pakistani politician

- میاں محمد فاروق

Member of the National Assembly of Pakistan
- In office 1 June 2013 – 31 May 2018
- Constituency: NA-80 (Faisalabad)

Personal details
- Party: Pakistan Muslim League (N)

Mian Muhammad Farooq (Urdu: میاں محمد فاروق) is a Pakistani politician who had been a member of the National Assembly of Pakistan from June 2013 to May 2018.

== Political career ==
He was elected to the National Assembly of Pakistan as a candidate of Pakistan Muslim League (N) from Constituency NA-80 (Faisalabad-VI) in the 2013 Pakistani general election. He received 96,039 votes and defeated Rana Asif Tauseef, a candidate of Pakistan Muslim League (Q).
