= Malik Umar Farooq Mushtaq =

Pakistani politician

- ملک عمر فاروق مشتاق

Member of the National Assembly of Pakistan
- Incumbent
- Assumed office 29 February 2024
- Constituency: NA-99 Faisalabad-V

Member of the Provincial Assembly of the Punjab
- In office 15 August 2018 – 14 January 2023
- Constituency: PP-106 Faisalabad-X

Personal details
- Party: PTI (2018-present)

Malik Umar Farooq Mushtaq (Urdu: ملک عمر فاروق مشتاق) is a Pakistani politician who has been a member of the National Assembly of Pakistan since February 2024. He had also been a member of the Provincial Assembly of the Punjab from August 2018 till January 2023.

== Political career ==
He was elected to the Provincial Assembly of the Punjab as an PTI candidate from PP-106 (Faisalabad-X) in the 2018 Punjab provincial election. He received votes and defeated Sardar Dilnawaz Ahmad Cheema, a candidate of Pakistan Tehreek-e-Insaf (PTI).

He joined the PTI following his election.

On 11 September 2018, he was inducted into the provincial cabinet of Chief Minister Usman Buzdar and was appointed special assistant to the Chief Minister on Youth Affairs and Sports.

He was elected to the National Assembly of Pakistan from NA-99 Faisalabad-V as an independent candidate supported by PTI in the 2024 Pakistani general election. He received 120,797 votes and defeated Muhammad Qasim Farooq, a candidate of Pakistan Muslim League (N) (PML(N)).
