= Khayal Ahmad Kastro =

Pakistani politician (born 1970)

Member of the Provincial Assembly of the Punjab
- Incumbent
- Assumed office 18 February 2024
- Constituency: PP-110 Faisalabad-XIV
- In office 15 August 2018 – 10 January 2023
- Constituency: PP-110 Faisalabad-XIV

Personal details
- Born: October 9, 1970 (age 56)
- Party: PTI (2013-present)
- Other political affiliations: Pakistan Muslim League (Q) (2002-2013)

Khayal Ahmad Kastro (born 9 October 1970) is a Pakistani politician who is a member of the Provincial Assembly of the Punjab since February 2024. Previously he has been a member of the Provincial Assembly of the Punjab from August 2018 till January 2023.

He was disqualified by Election Commission of Pakistan on 5 August 2025, for one term his membership in Punjab Assembly.

== Suspension ==
On 28 June 2025, Kastro was among 26 members of the opposition who were suspended from the Punjab Assembly for 15 sittings. The action was taken by Speaker Malik Muhammad Ahmed Khan following a disruption during Chief Minister Maryam Nawaz's address. The suspended lawmakers were accused of disorderly conduct, including chanting slogans, tearing official documents, and surrounding the speaker’s dais. The speaker also forwarded references against the suspended members to the Election Commission of Pakistan for further action.

== Political career ==
He was active at local level politics of Faisalabad from 2002 to 2013 from the platform of Pakistan Muslim League (Q).

He joined Pakistan Tehreek-e-Insaf in 2013.

He was elected to the Provincial Assembly of the Punjab as a candidate of the Pakistan Tehreek-e-Insaf (PTI) from PP-110 (Faisalabad-XIV) in the 2018 Punjab provincial election. He succeeded by getting 42,915 votes and defeated Malik Muhammad Nawaz of Pakistan Muslim League-N by a heavy margin of 25,313 votes.

In December 2020, he was appointed Provincial Minister of Punjab for Culture and Colonies.

He again contested for a seat in the Provincial Assembly from PP-116 Faisalabad-XX as a candidate of the PTI in the 2024 Punjab provincial election. He succeeded by getting 51,355 votes and defeated Malik Muhammad Nawaz of Pakistan Muslim League-N for the second consecutive time by a heavy margin of 31,233 votes.
