= Shahid Javed =

Pakistani politician (born 1965)

Honourable Shahid Javed MPA

Member of the Provincial Assembly of Punjab
- In office 23 February 2024 – 25 August 2025
- Preceded by: Mian Tahir Pervaz
- Succeeded by: Mian Tahir Pervaz
- Constituency: PP-115 Faisalabad-XVIII
- Majority: 13,896 (%13.13)

Personal details
- Party: PTI (2013-present)

Shahid Javed (born 9 January 1965) is a Pakistani politician who has been a Member of the Provincial Assembly of the Punjab since 2024.

He was re-elected by Election Commission of Pakistan (ECP) for violating rules.

== Political career ==
Javed ran for the seat of Provincial Assembly of the Punjab from PP-69 Faisalabad as a candidate of Pakistan Tehreek-e-Insaf (PTI) in the 2013 Pakistani general election, but was unsuccessful. He received 17,502 votes and lost the seat to Mian Tahir who secured 28,215 votes.

He was elected to the Provincial Assembly of the Punjab as a PTI-backed independent candidate from constituency PP-115 Faisalabad-XVIII in the 2024 Pakistani general election.

== Suspension ==
On 28 June 2025, Shahid was among 26 members of the opposition who were suspended from the Punjab Assembly for 15 sittings. The action was taken by Speaker Malik Muhammad Ahmed Khan following a disruption during Chief Minister Maryam Nawaz's address. The suspended lawmakers were accused of disorderly conduct, including chanting slogans, tearing official documents, and surrounding the speaker’s dais. The speaker also forwarded references against the suspended members to the Election Commission of Pakistan for further action.
