= Rana Atif =

Member of the National Assembly of Pakistan from Faisalabad (2024–2029)

- رانا عاطف

Member of the National Assembly of Pakistan
- Incumbent
- Assumed office 29 February 2024
- Preceded by: Faiz Ullah Kamoka
- Constituency: NA-101 Faisalabad-VII

Personal details
- Born: 27 March 1978 (age 48)
- Party: PTI (2010-present)

Rana Atif (Urdu: رانا عاطف) (born 27 March 1978) is a Pakistani politician who has been member of the National Assembly of Pakistan since 29 February 2024.

== Political career ==
Atif was elected to the National Assembly of Pakistan from NA-101 Faisalabad-VII as an Independent candidate supported by Pakistan Tehreek-e-Insaf (PTI) in the 2024 Pakistani general election. He received 134,886 votes while runner-up Mian Irfan Manan of Pakistan Muslim League (N) (PML(N)) received 89,612 votes.
