= Muhammad Ali Sarfraz =

Member of the National Assembly of Pakistan from Faisalabad (2024–2029)

- محمد علی سرفراز

Member of the National Assembly of Pakistan
- Incumbent
- Assumed office 29 February 2024
- Constituency: NA-103 Faisalabad-IX

Personal details
- Born: 10 August 1970 (age 55)
- Party: PTI (2024-present)

Mian Muhammad Ali Sarfraz (Urdu: میاں محمد علی سرفراز) is a Pakistani politician who has been a member of the National Assembly of Pakistan since February 2024.

== Political career ==
Sarfraz was elected to the National Assembly of Pakistan in the 2024 Pakistani general election from NA-103 Faisalabad-IX as an Independent candidate supported by Pakistan Tehreek-e-Insaf (PTI). He received 147,987 votes while runner up Akram Ansari of Pakistan Muslim League (N) (PML(N)) received 86,683 votes.
