= Mushtak Al-Atabi =

Iraqi engineer and academic

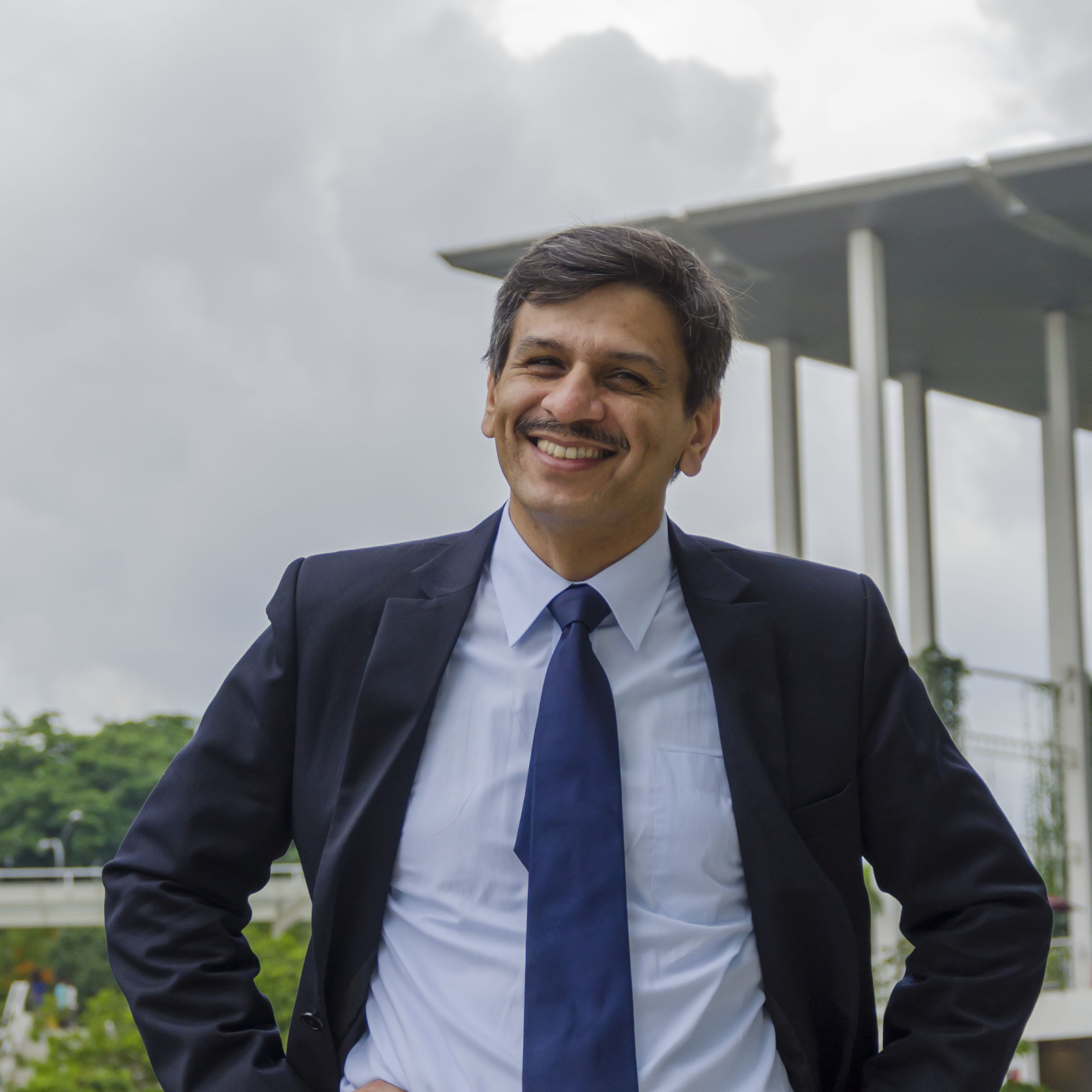
- Born: May 19, 1970 (age 56); Iraq
- Education: University of Baghdad (B.S. M.Sc.); University of Sheffield; (Ph.D.)
- Scientific career
- Fields: Engineering, education
- Workplaces: Heriot-Watt University, Malaysia
- Website: http://www.thinklikeanengineer.org

Mushtak Al-Atabi is the provost and CEO of Heriot Watt University Malaysia. His research focuses on thermofluids, renewable energy, biomechanical engineering, and engineering education. He is an Honorary Chair at the School of Mechanical Engineering of the University of Birmingham (UK) and the Editor-in-Chief of the Journal of Engineering Science & Technology. He has published three books, Think Like an Engineer, Shoot the Boss, and Driving Performance. He has numerous research publications, and has received various awards and honours. He is a Fellow of the Institution of Mechanical Engineers (FIMechE) and a member of the executive committee of the Global Engineering Deans Council.

Al-Atabi helped to develop the CDIO Initiative (Conceive, Design, Implement, Operate) and delivered the first MOOC (Massive Open Online Course) in Malaysia.

== Education ==
Al-Atabi attended Baghdad College from 1982 to 1988 and did his undergraduate studies in mechanical engineering at the University of Baghdad, Iraq from 1988 to 1992. He completed a Master's of Science in Mechanical Engineering in 1997. His master's thesis was titled "Experimental Investigation of Wing Tip Sails using Vortex Scanning and Forces Measurement."

In 2002, he joined the University of Sheffield, UK to pursue his Ph.D. in mechanical engineering. His Ph.D. thesis was titled "Cystic Duct to Static Mixer: A Serendipitous Journey”.

== Career ==
Al-Atabi began his academic career at the University of Baghdad when he was pursuing his master's degree. He moved to Malaysia in 1997 where he worked as a manufacturing manager at Lifelong Stainless Exhaust (M) Sdn Bhd, one of the country's main suppliers for OEM automotive exhaust systems.

In 1999, he joined Taylor's College School of Engineering as a senior lecturer for the University of Sheffield transfer programme, during which he taught engineering and IT subjects. It was also during this time when he initiated the Taylor's Research and Development Centre.

In 2004, Taylor's University College negotiated an agreement with the University of Birmingham to run their twinning programme. Al-Atabi worked as the head of department of the programme. In 2007, he was appointed as programme director for the programme. During this period he started the school's engineering fairs.

In 2009, Al-Atabi was appointed the dean of Taylor's School of Engineering when they launched their homegrown programme. During this period of time he was granted associate professorship at the school. In 2011 he was granted professorship by Taylor's University. During his time as dean, the school grew and flourished with project-based learning and CDIO; engineering undergraduate conference, EURECA; Grand Challenge Scholars Programme; and massive open online courses.

In 2014, Al-Atabi published two books: Driving Performance: Empowering People and Unleashing Potential and Think like an Engineer: Use systemic thinking to solve everyday challenges and unlock inherent values in them.

In February 2016, he was appointed the Pro Vice-Chancellor for Strategy of Taylor's University.

Mushtak Al-Atabi is currently the Provost and CEO of Heriot-Watt University in Malaysia, where he is working on leading the Pioneering in Education strategic theme for the university.

== Books ==
Al-Atabi has written a number of books, including:

- Driven by Purpose: Your Practical Guide to Discovering Individual and Team Purpose and Mobilising it into Positive Impact
- Leading with Stories: Securing Human Success in the Age of Artificial Intelligence
- Shoot the Boss: Leading with Stories in the Age of Emotional Intelligence
- Driving Performance: Empowering People and Unleashing Potential
- Think Like an Engineer: Use systemic thinking to solve everyday challenges and unlock inherent values in them

== Massive open online course ==
In 2013, Al-Atabi ran an open online course by a Malaysian institution, Entrepreneurship on Open Learning. Since then he has run multiple online courses, and such courses have since become a part of Malaysia's national higher education agenda, with Open Learning as its content distributor. The higher education ministry of Malaysia is currently working on the framework to accredit MOOCs.

== Written articles ==
Al-Atabi has written for Malaysian newspapers.

=== Written articles ===
- "Relevance of Soft Skills and Gratitude"
- "Views on Future-Proofing of Graduates"
- "Return on Failure"
- "Need for New Skills and Mindsets"

== Published papers ==
Al-Atabi has published papers in the area of engineering education, fluid mechanics, thermodynamics and biomedical engineering.
