= Mian Abdul Manan =

Pakistani politician

- میاں عبدالمنان

Member of the National Assembly of Pakistan
- In office 30 August 2013 – 31 May 2018
- Constituency: NA-83 (Faisalabad)

Personal details
- Party: Pakistan Muslim League (N)

Mian Abdul Manan (Urdu: میاں عبدالمنان) is a Pakistani politician who had been a member of the National Assembly of Pakistan, from August 2013 to May 2018.

== Political career ==
He ran for the seat of the National Assembly of Pakistan as a candidate of Pakistan Muslim League (N) (PML-N) from Constituency NA-83 (Faisalabad-IX) in the 2008 Pakistani general election but was unsuccessful. He received 55,861 votes and lost the seat to Muhammad Ijaz Virk.

He was elected to the National Assembly as a candidate of PML-N from Constituency NA-83 (Faisalabad-IX) in by-election held in August 2013. He received 47,107 votes and defeated a candidate of Pakistan Tehreek-e-Insaf.
