= PP-113 Faisalabad-XVI =

Constituency of the Provincial Assembly of Punjab, Pakistan

- Constituency for the Provincial Assembly of Punjab
- Region: Faisalabad city area in Faisalabad District

Current constituency
- Created from: PP-68 Faisalabad-XVIII (2002-2018); PP-115 Faisalabad-XIX (2018-2023)

PP-113 Faisalabad-XVI (پی پی-113، فیصل آباد-16) is a Constituency of Provincial Assembly of Punjab.

== General elections 2024 ==
Provincial election 2024: PP-113 Faisalabad-XVI
| Party | Candidate | Votes | % | ±% |
|---|---|---|---|---|
| Independent | Nadeem Sadiq Dogar (Note: Filed nomination papers as PTI candidate but ECP allowed him to run as an Independent) | 53,716 | 47.59 | |
| PML(N) | Ali Abbas Khan | 38,456 | 34.07 | |
| JI | Ajmal Hussain | 5,554 | 4.92 | |
| TLP | Muhammad Mansoor Ahmad Awan | 4,102 | 3.63 | |
| Independent | Muhammad Usman | 3,986 | 3.53 | |
| Independent | Muhammad Muzammal Dogar | 3,222 | 2.86 | |
| Others | Others (twenty candidates) | 3,827 | 3.40 | |
| Turnout | | 115,736 | 50.57 | |
| Total valid votes | | 112,863 | 97.52 | |
| Rejected ballots | | 2,873 | 2.48 | |
| Majority | | 15,260 | 13.52 | |
| Registered electors | | 228,867 | | |
| hold | | | | |

== General elections 2018 ==
Provincial election 2018: PP-115 Faisalabad-XIX
| Party | Candidate | Votes | % | ±% |
|---|---|---|---|---|
| PML(N) | Ali Abbas Khan | 53,271 | 45.33 | |
| PTI | Asad Muazzam | 52,736 | 44.87 | |
| TLP | Talib Hussain | 4,086 | 3.48 | |
| PPP | Najaf Zia | 2,994 | 2.55 | |
| AAT | Javed Iqbal | 2,379 | 2.02 | |
| MMA | Rai Muhammad Akram Khan | 1,548 | 1.32 | |
| Others | Others (two candidates) | 508 | 0.44 | |
| Turnout | | 120,478 | 58.08 | |
| Total valid votes | | 117,522 | 97.55 | |
| Rejected ballots | | 2,956 | 2.45 | |
| Majority | | 535 | 0.46 | |
| Registered electors | | 207,450 | | |

== General elections 2013 ==
Provincial election 2013: PP-68 Faisalabad-XVIII
| Party | Candidate | Votes | % | ±% |
|---|---|---|---|---|
| PML(N) | Sheikh Ijaz Ahmed | 40,235 | 38.39 | |
| PTI | Muhammad Latif Nazar | 28,168 | 26.88 | |
| Independent | Shafiq Ahmed Gujjar | 18,842 | 17.98 | |
| Independent | Sheikh Muhammad Yousaf | 5,215 | 4.98 | |
| PPP | Rana Farrukh Mehmood | 4,035 | 3.85 | |
| Independent | Saif Ul Haq Baig | 1,860 | 1.77 | |
| APML | Abdul Rauf | 1,604 | 1.53 | |
| JI | Mehboob Ul Zaman Butt | 1,146 | 1.09 | |
| Others | Others (twenty six candidates) | 3,705 | 3.53 | |
| Turnout | | 105,921 | 56.38 | |
| Total valid votes | | 104,810 | 98.95 | |
| Rejected ballots | | 1,111 | 1.05 | |
| Majority | | 12,067 | 11.51 | |
| Registered electors | | 187,876 | | |

== See also ==
- PP-112 Faisalabad-XV
- PP-114 Faisalabad-XVII
