= PP-114 Faisalabad-XVII =

Constituency of the Punjabi Provincial Legislature, Pakistan

- Constituency for the Provincial Assembly of Punjab
- Region: Faisalabad city area in Faisalabad District

Current constituency
- Created from: PP-69 Faisalabad-XIX (2002-2018); PP-114 Faisalabad-XVIII (2018-2023)

PP-114 Faisalabad-XVII (پی پی-114، فیصل آباد-17) is a Constituency of Provincial Assembly of Punjab.

== General elections 2024 ==
Provincial election 2024: PP-114 Faisalabad-XVII
Party	Candidate	Votes	%	±%
Independent	Chaudhry Latif Nazar Gujjar (Note: Filed nomination papers as PTI candidate but ECP allowed him to run as an Independent)	58,564	51.62	
PML(N)	Muhammad Yousaf	38,811	34.21	
TLP	Liaqat Ali	4,690	4.13	
Independent	Saif Ur Rehman	3,350	2.95	
JI	Mian Abdul Sattar Baiga	2,309	2.04	
Others	Others (thirty six candidates)	5,734	5.05	
Turnout		116,030	47.92	
Total valid votes		113,458	97.78	
Rejected ballots		2,572	2.22	
Majority		19,753	17.41	
Registered electors		242,157		
hold				

== General elections 2018 ==
Provincial election 2018: PP-114 Faisalabad-XVIII
Party	Candidate	Votes	%	±%
PTI	Muhammad Latif Nazar	59,701	48.61	
PML(N)	Sheikh Ijaz Ahmad	50,343	40.99	
TLP	Raja Saleem Abid	4,726	3.85	
PPP	Muhammad Shakoor	2,604	2.12	
AAT	Riasat Ali	2,166	1.76	
MMA	Abdul Shakoor Rizvi	1,908	1.55	
Others	Others (four candidates)	1,359	1.11	
Turnout		125,017	56.59	
Total valid votes		122,807	98.23	
Rejected ballots		2,210	1.77	
Majority		9,358	7.62	
Registered electors		220,920		

== General elections 2013 ==
Provincial election 2013: PP-69 Faisalabad-XIX
Party	Candidate	Votes	%	±%
PML(N)	Mian Tahir	33,198	38.61	
Independent	Doctor Khalid Imtiaz Khan Baloch	17,265	20.08	
PTI	Sheikh Shahid Javed	15,670	18.23	
PPP	Rana Anwar Ul Haq	10,987	12.78	
JI	Sajid Iqbal Gujjar	5,051	5.87	
JUI (F)	Makhdoom Zada Syed Muhammad Zakaria Shah	1,498	1.74	
APML	Mian Muhammad Afzaal Jalla	1,138	1.32	
Others	Others (twenty candidates)	1,171	1.36	
Turnout		88,143	57.46	
Total valid votes		85,978	97.54	
Rejected ballots		2,165	2.46	
Majority		15,933	18.53	
Registered electors		153,393		

== General elections 2008 ==
Contesting candidates	Party affiliation	Votes polled

== See also ==
- PP-113 Faisalabad-XVI
- PP-115 Faisalabad-XVIII
