= Rana Ahmad Sheheryar Khan =

Pakistani politician

Honourable Rana Ahmad Sheheryar Khan MPA
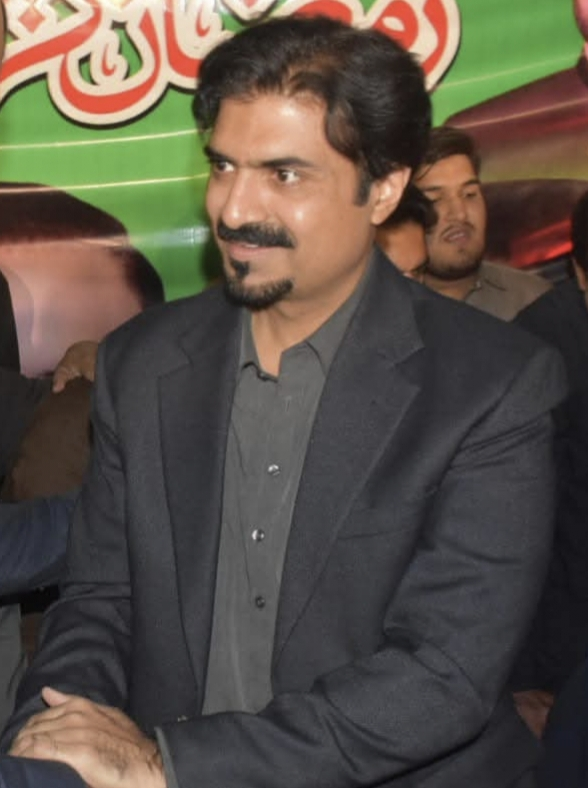
- Khan in 2025

Member of the Provincial Assembly of Punjab
- Incumbent
- Assumed office 28 November 2025
- Preceded by: Haji Ismael Seela
- Constituency: PP-116 Faisalabad-XIX
- Majority: 37,395 (59.64%)

Personal details
- Party: Pakistan Muslim League (N)
- Parent: Rana Sanaullah
- Occupation: Politician, businessman

Rana Ahmad Sheheryar Khan, is a Pakistani businessman and politician who is a Member of the Provincial Assembly of Punjab since the 28 November 2025 elections.

He is son-in-law of former Interior Minister Rana Sanaullah. From January 2023, he was the Pakistan Muslim League (Nawaz) (PML-N) Youth Wing President in Faisalabad.

== Political career ==
He contest election in 2018 Pakistani general election as an independent candidate from Faisalabad PP-113 but he was lost he received only 224 votes and lost the Provincial seat to Waris Aziz, His father in law Rana Sanaullah also contest from same seat and lost.

He contest election in 2024 Pakistani general election as a candidate of Pakistan Muslim League (Nawaz) (PML(N)) from constituency PP-116 Faisalabad-XIX but was unsuccessful he received 52,496 votes and lost to Muhammad Ismael.

He was elected to the Provincial Assembly of Punjab as a candidate of the Pakistan Muslim League (N) (PML-N) from Constituency PP-116 Faisalabad-XIX in a by-election held on 23 November 2025. He received 48,824 votes and defeated independent candidate Asghar Ali, who received 11,429 votes. The seat became vacant due to the disqualification of a Pakistan Tehreek-e-Insaf (PTI) lawmaker following convictions related to the May 2023 riots.

== Arrest ==
In August 2019, Rana Ahmad Shehryar Khan was arrested by Faisalabad police in connection with a murder case. The investigation concerned the killing of a man who had been accused of murdering his two brothers in cases registered at Samanabad Police Station. Following his arrest, a judicial magistrate remanded Khan into seven days of physical custody, which was later extended. During custody, he claimed he had been subjected to torture and requested a medical examination; however, a medical board reported finding no evidence of physical harm. In September 2019, an Anti-Terrorism Court granted him bail upon submission of a surety bond.

== See also ==
- List of members of the 18th Provincial Assembly of the Punjab
