= NA-102 Faisalabad-VIII =

Constituency of the National Assembly of Pakistan

- Constituency for the National Assembly of Pakistan
- District: Faislabad City area of Faisalabad District
- Polling divisions: 377
- Population: 937,233
- Electorate: 541,653

Current constituency
- Created: 1970
- Number of members: 11
- Party: Pakistan Tehreek-e-Insaf
- Member: Changaiz Ahmed Khan Kakar
- Created from: NA-84 (Faisalabad-X)

NA-102 Faisalabad-VIII (این اے-102، فیصل آباد-۸) is a constituency of the National Assembly of Pakistan, located within the Faisalabad District. This constituency encompasses part of Faisalabad City.

Historically, the constituency was a stronghold of the Pakistan Muslim League (N) (PML-N), which secured significant victories in earlier elections. However, the political landscape shifted in favor of the Pakistan Tehreek-e-Insaf (PTI) in recent years. PTI secured wins in both the 2018 Pakistani general election and the 2022 Pakistan by-elections. This trend continued in the 2024 Pakistani general election, where Changaiz Ahmed Khan Kakar, supported by PTI, emerged victorious.

== Members of Parliament ==
=== 1970–1977: NW-56 Layallpur-VIII ===
Election	Member	Party
1970	Ghulam Nabi Chuadhary	PPP

=== 1977–1988: NA-76 Faisalabad-IX ===
Election	Member	Party
1977	Ghulam Nabi Chuadhary	PPP
1985	Abdullah Ghazi	PNA

=== 1988–1990: NA-65 Faisalabad-IX ===
Election	Member	Party
1988	Mehar Abdul Rasheed	PPP
1990	Chaudhary Sher Ali	IJI

=== 1993–2002: NA-64 Faisalabad-IX ===
Election	Member	Party
1993	Chaudhary Sher Ali	IJI
1997	Chaudhary Sher Ali	PML-N

=== 2002–2018: NA-84 Faisalabad-VIII ===
Election	Member	Party
2002	Abid Sher Ali	PML-N
2008	Abid Sher Ali	PML-N
2013	Abid Sher Ali	PML-N

=== 2018–2023: NA-108 Faisalabad-VIII ===
Election	Member	Party
2018	Farrukh Habib	PTI
2022	Imran Khan	PTI

=== 2024–2029: NA-102 Faisalabad-VIII ===
Election	Member	Party
2024	Changaiz Ahmed Khan Kakar	PTI

== List of Members ==
N	Portrait	MNAs	Entered Office	Left Office
1		Ghulam Nabi Chuadhary	7 December 1970	6 March 1977
2		Ghulam Nabi Chuadhary	7 March 1977	5 July 1977
3		Abdullah Ghazi	25 February 1985	29 May 1988
4		Mehar Abdul Rasheed	2 December 1988	6 August 1990
5		Chaudhary Sher Ali	6 November 1990	18 July 1993
5		Chaudhary Sher Ali	18 October 1993	5 November 1996
5		Chaudhary Sher Ali	17 February 1997	12 October 1999
6		Abid Sher Ali	18 November 2002	31 May 2018
7		Farrukh Habib	13 August 2018	9 April 2022
8		Imran Khan	16 October 2022	Disqualified
9		Changaiz Ahmed Khan Kakar	29 February 2024	Incumbent

== Election 2002 ==
General elections were held on 10 October 2002. Abid Sher Ali of PML-N won by 33,455 votes.

General election 2002: NA-84 Faisalabad-X
Party	Candidate	Votes	%	±%
PML(N)	Abid Sher Ali	33,455	37.46	
NA	Fazal Hussain Rahi	24,092	26.98	
PPP	Ch. Badar Ud Din	22,484	25.18	
MMA	Muhammad Ghulam Rasool	6,629	7.42	
Others	Others (six candidates)	2,650	2.96	
Turnout		90,881	35.34	
Total valid votes		89,310	98.27	
Rejected ballots		1,571	1.73	
Majority		9,363	10.48	
Registered electors		257,162		

== Election 2008 ==
General elections were held on 18 February 2008. Abid Sher Ali of PML-N won by 59,616 votes.

General election 2008: NA-84 Faisalabad-X
Party	Candidate	Votes	%	±%
PML(N)	Abid Sher Ali	59,616	53.20	
PPP	Mehar Abdul Rashid	38,421	34.28	
PML(Q)	Rana Zahid Mahmood	11,925	10.64	
Others	Others (six candidates)	2,106	1.88	
Turnout		113,873	45.66	
Total valid votes		180,530	98.42	
Rejected ballots		1,805	1.58	
Majority		21,195	18.92	
Registered electors		249,391		
PML(N) hold				

== Election 2013 ==
General elections were held on 11 May 2013.

Abid Sher Ali of PML-N won by 103,176 votes and became the member of National Assembly.

General election 2013: NA-84 Faisalabad-X
Party	Candidate	Votes	%	±%
PML(N)	Abid Sher Ali	103,268	57.20	
PTI	Farrukh Habib	42,487	23.53	
PPP	Malik Asghar Ali Qaisar	21,572	11.95	
Others	Others (fourteen candidates)	13,203	7.32	
Turnout		185,039	59.90	
Total valid votes		180,530	97.56	
Rejected ballots		4,509	2.44	
Majority		60,781	33.67	
Registered electors		308,900		
PML(N) hold				

== Election 2018 ==
General elections were held on 25 July 2018.

Farrukh Habib of Pakistan Tehreek-e-Insaf (PTI) won by 112,740 votes and become the Member of the National Assembly.

General election 2018: NA-108 Faisalabad-VIII
Party	Candidate	Votes	%	±%
PTI	Farrukh Habib	112,740	46.47	
PML(N)	Abid Sher Ali	111,529	45.98	
Others	Others (seven candidates)	18,313	7.55	
Turnout		247,759	57.01	
Total valid votes		242,582	97.91	
Rejected ballots		5,177	2.09	
Majority		1,211	0.49	
Registered electors		434,583		
PTI gain from PML(N)				

== By-election 2022 ==
A by-election was held on 16 October 2022 due to the resignation of Farrukh Habib, the previous MNA from this seat.

By-election 2022: NA-108 Faisalabad-VIII
Party	Candidate	Votes	%	±%
PTI	Imran Khan	100,046	54.87	▲8.40
PML(N)	Abid Sher Ali	75,421	41.36	▼4.62
TLP	Muhammad Sadique	3,131	1.72	▼1.59
Others	Others (nine candidates)	3,737	2.05	
Turnout		184,350	36.49	▼20.52
Rejected ballots		2,015	1.09	▼1.00
Majority		24,625	13.51	▲13.02
Registered electors		505,186		
PTI hold				

== Election 2024 ==
General elections were held on 8 February 2024. Changaiz Ahmed Khan Kakar, an independent candidate supported by PTI won with 132,553 votes.

General election 2024: NA-102 Faisalabad-VIII
Party	Candidate	Votes	%	±%
PTI	Changaiz Ahmed Khan Kakar (Note: Filed nomination papers as PTI candidate but ECP allowed him to run as an Independent)	132,553	51.04	▼3.83
PML(N)	Abid Sher Ali	100,328	38.63	▼2.73
Others	Others (thirty-eight candidates)	26,816	10.33	▲6.56
Total valid votes		259,697	98.08	
Rejected ballots		5,076	1.92	
Turnout		264,773	48.88	▲12.39
Majority		32,225	12.41	▼1.10
Registered electors		541,653		

== See also ==
- NA-108 (Faisalabad-VIII)
- NA-84 Faisalabad-X
