= PP-115 Faisalabad-XVIII =

Constituency of the Punjabi Provincial Legislature, Pakistan

- Constituency for the Provincial Assembly of Punjab
- Region: Faisalabad city area in Faisalabad District

Current constituency
- Created from: PP-62 Faisalabad-XII (2002-2018); PP-107 Faisalabad-XI (2018-2023)

PP-115 Faisalabad-XVIII (پی پی-115، فیصل آباد-18) is a Constituency of Provincial Assembly of Punjab.

== By-election 2025 ==
A by election was held on 23 November 2025 on Sunday, due to disqualification of Shahid Javed.

By election 2025: PP-115 Faisalabad-XVIII
Party	Candidate	Votes	%	±%
PML(N)	Mian Tahir Pervaz	49,046	92.74	
PPP	Muhammad Asghar	1,898	3.59	
BPP	Ahmed Tariq Cheema	1,729	3.27	
Others	Others (two candidates)	210	0.40	
Turnout		53,356	22.73	
Total valid votes		52,883	99.11	
Rejected ballots		473	0.89	
Majority		47,148	89.15	
Registered electors		234,734		
hold				

== General elections 2024 ==
Provincial election 2024: PP-115 Faisalabad-XVIII
Party	Candidate	Votes	%	±%
Independent	Shahid Javed (Note: Filed nomination papers as PTI candidate but ECP allowed him to run as an Independent)	53,271	50.32	
PML(N)	Mian Tahir Pervaz	39,375	37.19	
TLP	Abubakar Jawad	4,296	4.06	
PPP	Yaqoob Naeem	3,098	2.93	
Others	Others (twenty nine candidates)	5,829	5.50	
Turnout		107,410	48.54	
Total valid votes		105,869	98.57	
Rejected ballots		1,541	1.43	
Majority		13,896	13.13	
Registered electors		221,259		
hold				

== General elections 2018 ==
Provincial election 2018: PP-107 Faisalabad-XI
Party	Candidate	Votes	%	±%
PML(N)	Shafiq Ahmad	36,901	41.35	
PTI	Khalid Rafee Cheema	33,511	37.56	
Independent	Shahbaz Ahmad	9,551	10.70	
TLP	Sajjad Ali	4,061	4.55	
PPP	Nadeem Hayat Khan	3,816	4.28	
Others	Others (seventeen candidates)	1,392	1.56	
Turnout		91,833	54.77	
Total valid votes		89,232	97.17	
Rejected ballots		2,601	2.83	
Majority		3,390	3.79	
Registered electors		167,682		

== General elections 2013 ==
Provincial election 2013: PP-62 Faisalabad-XII
Party	Candidate	Votes	%	±%
PML(N)	Ch. Raza Nasrullah Ghumman	53,406	47.46	
PML(Q)	Ali Akhtar	23,936	21.27	
PTI	Muhammad Imran Waince	13,450	11.95	
Independent	Rai Ahsan Raza Kharal	8,934	7.94	
PPP	Muhammad Ijaz Ch.	8,496	7.55	
Others	Others (sixteen candidates)	4,304	3.82	
Turnout		116,342	59.92	
Total valid votes		112,526	96.72	
Rejected ballots		3,816	3.28	
Majority		29,470	26.19	
Registered electors		194,153		

== General elections 2008 ==
Contesting candidates	Party affiliation	Votes polled

== See also ==
- PP-114 Faisalabad-XVII
- PP-116 Faisalabad-XIX
