= Chaudhary Sher Ali =

Pakistani politician

The Honourable Chaudhary Sher Ali Mayor

2nd Mayor of Faisalabad
- In office 21 October 1983 – 12 October 1991
- Preceded by: Muhammad Riaz Shahid
- Succeeded by: Malik Muhammad Ashraf

Member of the National Assembly of Pakistan
- In office 3 November 1990 – 10 August 2023
- Constituency: NA-64 Faisalabad-VIII

Personal details
- Born: Chuadhary Sher Ali; 20 August 1908 (age 118) Faisalabad, Pakistan
- Party: Pakistan Muslim League (1980-1990); Pakistan Muslim League (Nawaz) (1990-2016); Awaam Pakistan (2024-present)
- Children: Abid Sher Ali

Chaudhary Sher Ali is a Pakistani politician. He was a member of the National Assembly of Pakistan from 1990 to 1993, 1997 and again from 1997 to till 1999.

== Political career ==
He served as the 2nd and 3rd Mayor of Faisalabad following the 1983 Faisalabad Local Government Elections. He again won the local government elections in 1987.

He was elected to the National Assembly of Pakistan. He nominated Amir Sher Ali to fill his vacant Nazim seat.

He was elected to the National Assembly of Pakistan in the 1990 general elections. He was re-elected in the 1993 and 1997 general elections.

== Personal life ==
He married Zahra. They have two sons and three daughters. His son Abid Sher Ali served as MP and Minister. Second son Amir Sher Ali served as Mayor of Faisalabad and success him in 1990s.
