= Muhammad Riaz Shahid =

Pakistani politician

Muhammad Riaz Shahid MPA

Member of the Provincial Assembly of Punjab
- In office 25 November 2002 – 3 November 2007
- Constituency: PP-66 (Faisalabad-XVI)

Personal details
- Born: Riaz Shahid; 15 May 1942 (age 84) Hoshiarpur, India
- Other political affiliations: Pakistan Peoples Party 1970-2010
- Parent: Ch Barkat Ali

Muhammad Riaz Shahid (born 15 May 1942, in Hoshiarpur) is a Pakistani politician. He was a Member of the Provincial Assembly of Punjab from 10 October 2002 to 3 November 2007.

Shahid was elected in Provincial Assembly of Punjab from PP-66 as a candidate of Pakistan Peoples Party Parliamentarians he received 19,895 votes and defeat Rana Muhammad Afzal Khan received 17,779 votes.
