= PP-117 Faisalabad-XX =

Constituency for the Provincial Assembly of Punjab, Pakistan

- Constituency for the Provincial Assembly of Punjab
- Region: Faisalabad city area in Faisalabad District

Current constituency
- Created from: PP-71 Faisalabad-XXI (2002-2018); PP-112 Faisalabad-XVI (2018-2023)

PP-117 Faisalabad-XX (پی پی-117، فیصل آباد-20) is a Constituency of Provincial Assembly of Punjab.

== General elections 2024 ==
Provincial election 2024: PP-117 Faisalabad-XX
Party	Candidate	Votes	%	±%
Independent	Abdul Razzaq Khan (Note: Filed nomination papers as PTI candidate but ECP allowed him to run as an Independent)	54,181	49.83	
PML(N)	Muhammad Rizwan Butt	40,071	36.85	
TLP	Muhammad Zia UI Mustafa	7,272	6.69	
Others	Others (twenty two candidates)	7,211	6.63	
Turnout		110,213	47.61	
Total valid votes		108,735	98.66	
Rejected ballots		1,478	1.34	
Majority		14,110	12.98	
Registered electors		231,479		
hold				

== General elections 2018 ==
Provincial election 2018: PP-112 Faisalabad-XVI
Party	Candidate	Votes	%	±%
PML(N)	Muhammad Tahir Pervaiz	49,455	46.97	
PTI	Adnan Anwar Rehmani	46,769	44.41	
TLP	Muhammad Esa	4,191	3.98	
PPP	Intazar Ahmed	1,799	1.71	
Others	Others (fourteen candidates)	3,088	2.93	
Turnout		107,505	55.17	
Total valid votes		105,302	97.95	
Rejected ballots		2,203	2.05	
Majority		2,686	2.56	
Registered electors		194,860		

== General elections 2013 ==
Provincial election 2013: PP-71 Faisalabad-XXI
Party	Candidate	Votes	%	±%
PML(N)	Malik Muhammad Nawaz	56,007	49.96	
Independent	Muhammad Ud Din	22,923	20.45	
PTI	Rana Babar Khan Advocate	18,205	16.24	
Independent	Mian Sageer Anwar Chishti	4,600	4.10	
PPP	Intazar Adeel Taj	3,680	3.28	
Independent	Muhammd Sajid Malik	1,250	1.12	
PML(Z)	Mian Sajid Hussain Anjum	1,234	1.10	
PST	Sahabzada Mian Muhammad Asghar	1,167	1.04	
Others	Others (twenty three candidates)	3,028	2.70	
Turnout		113,818	59.71	
Total valid votes		112,094	98.49	
Rejected ballots		1,724	1.51	
Majority		33,084	29.51	
Registered electors		190,615		

== General elections 2008 ==
Contesting candidates	Party affiliation	Votes polled

== See also ==
- PP-116 Faisalabad-XIX
- PP-118 Faisalabad-XXI
