= NA-108 (Faisalabad-VIII) =

- Former constituency for the National Assembly of Pakistan
- Region: Faisalabad District
- Electorate: 434,583

Former constituency
- Created: 2018
- Abolished: 2023
- Members: Farrukh Habib; Imran Khan
- Created from: NA-84 Faisalabad-X
- Replaced by: NA-102 Faisalabad-VIII

NA-108 (Faisalabad-VIII) (این اے-۸۲، فیصل آباد-۸) is a constituency for the National Assembly of Pakistan.

== Election 2018 ==
General election 2018 was held on 25 July 2018.

General election 2018: NA-108 Faisalabad-VIII
Party	Candidate	Votes	%	±%
PTI	Farrukh Habib	112,740	46.47	
PML(N)	Abid Sher Ali	111,529	45.98	
Others	Others (seven candidates)	18,313	7.55	
Turnout		247,759	57.01	
Total valid votes		242,582	97.91	
Rejected ballots		5,177	2.09	
Majority		1,211	0.49	
Registered electors		434,583		
PTI gain from PML(N)				

== By-election 2022 ==
A by-election was held on 16 October 2022 due to the resignation of Farrukh Habib, the previous MNA from this seat.

By-election 2022: NA-108 Faisalabad-VIII
Party	Candidate	Votes	%	±%
PTI	Imran Khan	100,046	54.87	▲8.40
PML(N)	Abid Sher Ali	75,421	41.36	▼4.62
TLP	Muhammad Sadique	3,131	1.72	▼1.59
Others	Others (nine candidates)	3,737	2.05	
Turnout		184,350	36.49	▼20.52
Rejected ballots		2,015	1.09	▼1.00
Majority		24,625	13.51	▲13.02
Registered electors		505,186		
PTI hold				
