= Changaiz Ahmed Khan Kakar =

Member of the National Assembly of Pakistan from Faisalabad (2024–2029)

- چنگیز احمد خان کاکڑ

Member of the National Assembly of Pakistan
- Incumbent
- Assumed office 20 February 2024
- Preceded by: Farrukh Habib
- Constituency: NA-102 Faisalabad-VIII
- Majority: 32,225 (%12.41)

Member of Punjab Bar Council
- Incumbent
- Assumed office 20 January 2025
- Constituency: General Seat from Punjab
- In office 2020–2025
- Constituency: General Seat from Punjab
- In office 2015–2020
- Constituency: General Seat from Punjab
- In office 2010–2015
- Constituency: General Seat from Punjab

Personal details
- Born: Unknown Toba Tek Singh Tehsil, Lyallpur District, Dominion of Pakistan
- Party: PTI (2002-present)
- Parent: Niaz Muhammad Khan

Changaiz Ahmed Khan Kakar (Urdu: چنگیز احمد خان کاکڑ) is a Pakistani politician and lawyer who is a member of the National Assembly of Pakistan from Constituency NA-102 Faisalabad-VIII, in office since 29 February 2024, and is serving as a Member Punjab Bar Council.

Kakar is from Chak No. 352 JB, Gojra Tehsil, Toba Tek Singh District, Pakistan, and is presently living in Islamabad.

== Early life ==
Kakar was born in Toba Tek Singh Tehsil, Lyallpur District, Dominion of Pakistan (present-day Gojra Tehsil, Toba Tek Singh District, Pakistan) to Niaz Muhammad Khan.

He was enrolled as an advocate on 1 September 1991.

== Political career ==
Kakar has served as a member of the Punjab Bar Council.

Kakar was elected to the National Assembly of Pakistan from NA-102 Faisalabad-VIII as an Independent candidate supported by Pakistan Tehreek-e-Insaf (PTI) in the 2024 Pakistani general election. He received 132,553 votes while runner-up Abid Sher Ali of the Pakistan Muslim League (N) (PML-N) received 100,328 votes.

=== Electoral performance ===
General election 2024: NA-102 Faisalabad-VIII
Party	Candidate	Votes	%	±%
Independent	Changez Ahmed Khan Kakar (Note: Filed nomination papers as PTI candidate but ECP allowed him to run as an Independent)	132,553	51.04	▼3.83
PML(N)	Abid Sher Ali	100,328	38.63	▼2.73
Others	Others (thirty-eight candidates)	26,816	10.33	▲6.56
Total valid votes		259,697	98.08	
Rejected ballots		5,076	1.92	
Turnout		264,773	48.88	▲12.39
Majority		32,225	12.41	▼1.10
Registered electors		541,653		
