= Faiz Ullah Kamoka =

Pakistani politician

Chairman of House Standing Committee on Finance, Revenue and Economic Affairs
- In office 5 December 2019 – 10 April 2022
- Preceded by: Asad Umar

Member of the National Assembly of Pakistan
- In office 13 August 2018 – 10 April 2022
- Constituency: NA-109 (Faisalabad-IX)

Personal details
- Born: July 6, 1970 (age 56) Faisalabad, Punjab, Pakistan
- Party: IPP (2023-present)
- Other political affiliations: PTI (2011–2023); PPP (2002–2011)

Faiz Ullah Kamoka (born 6 July 1970) is a Pakistani politician who was a member of the National Assembly of Pakistan from August 2018 to April 2022. On 5 December 2019 he was elected as Chairman Standing Committee on Finance, Revenue and Economic Affairs after the resignation of Asad Umar.

== Early life and education ==
Faiz Ullah Kamoka was born on 6 July 1970 in Faisalabad, Pakistan.

He received the degree of Bachelor of Commerce from Hailey College of Commerce and the degree of Master of Business Administration in Finance from Punjab College of Business Administration in 1999.

== Political career ==
Faiz Ullah Kamoka was elected to the Provincial Assembly of the Punjab as a candidate of Pakistan Peoples Party (PPP) from Constituency PP-68 (Faisalabad-XVIII) in the 2002 Pakistani general election. He received 19,417 votes and defeated Mian Zulfiqar Inayat, a candidate of Pakistan Muslim League (N) (PML-N).

He contested the 2008 Pakistani general election as a candidate of Pakistan Peoples Party (PPP) from Constituency PP-68 (Faisalabad-XVIII). He was defeated by Sheikh Ijaz Ahmad of PMLN in that election by a heavy margin of 13455 Votes.

He contested the 2013 Pakistani general election for MNA National Assembly of Pakistan as a candidate of Pakistan Tehreek-e-Insaf (PTI) from Constituency NA-109 (Faisalabad-IX). He was defeated by Mian Abdul Mannan of PMLN in that election by a margin of 55,313 Votes.

Faiz Ullah Kamoka was elected to the National Assembly of Pakistan as a candidate of Pakistan Tehreek-e-Insaf (PTI) from Constituency NA-109 (Faisalabad-IX) in the 2018 Pakistani general election. He defeated Mian Abdul Mannan of PMLN by a heavy margin of 129,000 Votes.

On 5 December 2019 Faiz Ullah Kamoka was elected as Chairman Standing Committee on Finance, Revenue and Economic Affairs following the resignation of Asad Umar. Faiz Ullah Kamoka resigned from the National Assembly in January 2023.

== More Reading ==
- List of members of the 15th National Assembly of Pakistan
