= Rana Zahid Tauseef =

Pakistani politician

Rana Zahid Tauseef (born 1 April 1950) is a Pakistani politician and businessman affiliated with the Pakistan Muslim League (N) party who has previously served as the mayor (Nazim) of Faisalabad, his hometown in Punjab, Pakistan.

Zahid has also been an elected member of the National Assembly of Pakistan in the past. His brother, Rana Asif Tauseef, is also a politician from PML (Q) who also served as State Minister for Privatization.
