= Abid Sher Ali =

Member of the Senate of Pakistan (2026–27)

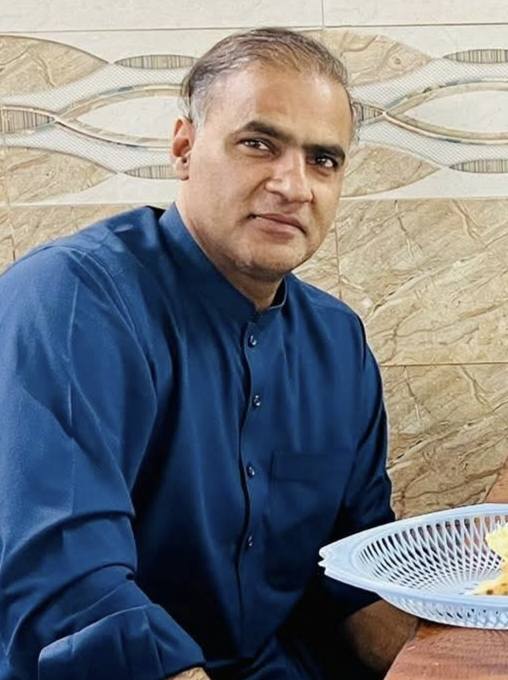
- Abid Sher Ali in 2025

Minister of State for Power
- In office 4 August 2017 – 31 May 2018
- President: Mamnoon Hussain
- Prime Minister: Shahid Khaqan Abbasi

Minister of State for Water and Power
- In office 7 June 2013 – 28 July 2017
- President: Asif Ali Zardari; Mamnoon Hussain
- Prime Minister: Nawaz Sharif

Member of the Senate of Pakistan
- Incumbent
- Assumed office 16 January 2026
- Prime Minister: Shehbaz Sharif
- Preceded by: Irfan Siddiqui
- Constituency: General seat from Punjab

Member of the National Assembly of Pakistan
- In office 1 June 2013 – 31 May 2018
- Succeeded by: Farrukh Habib
- Constituency: NA-84 (Faisalabad-X)
- Majority: 60,781 votes (33.67%)
- In office 17 March 2008 – 16 March 2013
- Constituency: NA-84 (Faisalabad-X)
- Majority: 21,195 (18.92%)
- In office 16 November 2002 – 2 October 2007
- Preceded by: Constituency Established
- Constituency: NA-84 (Faisalabad-X)
- Majority: 9,363 (10.48%)

Personal details
- Party: Pakistan Muslim League (N)
- Relations: See Sharif Family
- Parent: Chaudhary Sher Ali (father)
- Education: University of the Punjab (LL.B)
- Profession: Politician

Chaudhry Abid Sher Ali (born 21 November 1971) is a Pakistani politician who is Member of the Senate of Pakistan since 16 January 2026.

Previously, he served as Minister of State for Power, in office from August 2017 to May 2018. Previously he served as the Minister of State for Water and Power from 2013 to 2017. He has been a member of the National Assembly of Pakistan from 2002 to 2018.

He was elected as the member of Senate of Pakistan, was elected in December 2025 on Pakistan Muslim League (N) ticket.

== Early life and education ==
Ali was born in Faisalabad, Punjab on 21 November 1971. Ali is the son of former mayor of Faisalabad and senior PML-N leader Chaudhry Sher Ali, who is a relative of Kalsoom Nawaz Sharif; Ali is a nephew of Nawaz Sharif. He holds a master's degree in business and finance.

== Political career ==
Ali was elected as the member of the National Assembly of Pakistan on the ticket of the Pakistan Muslim League (N) (PML-N) from constituency NA-84 (Faisalabad-X) in Pakistani general election, 2002. He was re-elected as the member of the National Assembly of Pakistan on the ticket of the PML-N from constituency NA-84 Faisalabad in Pakistani general election, 2008. Ali was re-elected for the third consecutive time as the member of the National Assembly of Pakistan on the ticket of the PML-N from his constituency in Pakistani general election, 2013.

In July 2013, Ali was appointed as the Minister of State for Water and Power. He had ceased to hold ministerial office in July 2017 when the federal cabinet was disbanded following the resignation of Prime Minister Nawaz Sharif after Panama Papers case decision. Following the election of Shahid Khaqan Abbasi as Prime Minister of Pakistan in August 2017, he was inducted into the federal cabinet of Abbasi. He was appointed as the Minister of State for Power, a division under then-newly created Ministry of Energy.

He ran for the seat of the National Assembly from NA-108 (Faisalabad-VIII) as a candidate of PML(N) in the 2018 Pakistani general election but was unsuccessful and lost the seat to Farrukh Habib, a candidate of Pakistan Tehreek-e-Insaf (PTI).

After the 2018 general elections, Hamza Shahbaz resigned from his National Assembly seat, NA-124 (Lahore). Abid Sher Ali submitted nomination papers to contest the subsequent by-election as a Pakistan Muslim League (N) candidate. However, the party leadership opted to award the ticket to senior PML-N figure and former Prime Minister Shahid Khaqan Abbasi. Abbasi contested the by-election as the official PML-N candidate, while Abid Sher Ali also ran independently and was defeated by Abbasi.

He ran for the seat of the National Assembly from NA-108 (Faisalabad-VIII) as a candidate of PML(N) in the 2022 Pakistan by-elections but was unsuccessful. He received 75,421 votes and lost the seat to chairman of Pakistan Tehreek-e-Insaf (PTI) Imran Khan.

He ran for the seat of the National Assembly from NA-102 Faisalabad-VIII as a candidate of Pakistan Muslim League (Nawaz) (PML-(N)) in the 2024 Pakistani general election but was unsuccessful, with heavy margin of 32,225 he received 100,320 votes and lost the seat to Changaiz Ahmed Khan Kakar, an independent candidate supported by Pakistan Tehreek-e-Insaf (PTI), who received 132,526 votes.

He was elected to Senate of Pakistan as unopposed in December 2025, after the death of Senator Irfan Saddique.

== Controversies ==
=== Corruption inquiries and related allegations ===
Media reports have linked Abid Sher Ali and members of his family to various corruption-related inquiries. In 2020–2021, the National Accountability Bureau (NAB) reportedly initiated investigations involving his father concerning alleged irregularities in the allotment of government land. Additional reporting on his political activities in 2022–2023 often described him as “facing corruption charges,” though many of these allegations were part of broader anti-corruption drives targeting multiple political figures. These references were largely based on public perception and media commentary rather than any completed prosecution.

=== Legal cases, arrest warrants and court actions ===
In January 2024, an Anti-Terrorism Court reportedly issued arrest warrants for Abid Sher Ali in relation to a property-sale dispute in which the complainant alleged fraud and threats. Separate earlier legal proceedings involving his brother, Amir Sher Ali, resulted in acquittal by the Supreme Court in 2014, an outcome noted in media coverage of public-sector corruption cases.

=== Election-related disputes and code-of-conduct issues ===
The Election Commission of Pakistan (ECP) issued notices to Abid Sher Ali during the NA-108 (Faisalabad) by-election in 2022 for alleged violations of the election code of conduct. A district monitoring officer also imposed a fine for breaching campaign guidelines. Abid Sher Ali has also filed several petitions for recounts and challenges to close election results. Some of these petitions were dismissed by election tribunals and the Lahore High Court, according to press reporting.

=== FIRs and public-order complaints ===
In October 2022, Faisalabad police registered a First Information Report (FIR) naming Abid Sher Ali and others in connection with allegations of violence and firing during a political incident, resulting in injuries to a worker of a rival party. The case drew further political attention due to heightened tensions in the district at the time.

=== Period of self-exile and return ===
News coverage noted that Abid Sher Ali spent several years abroad before returning to Pakistan in 2022. Reports described the period as self-exile amid references to pending legal matters and ongoing political rivalries.

=== 23 November Election ===
In November 2025, during the by-elections, Senator Abid Sher Ali faced scrutiny regarding an alleged breach of ballot secrecy in Faisalabad. A video circulating on social media showed the Senator marking his ballot paper in front of cameras rather than behind the designated secrecy screen at the polling station. The Returning Officer for PP-116 subsequently summoned him to explain the incident, and the matter was also referred to the Election Commission of Pakistan (ECP) for further proceedings.

=== 2018 National Assembly altercation ===
In April 2018, Abid Sher Ali was involved in a physical scuffle with another lawmaker inside the National Assembly, which gained significant national media attention. This incident reflected the tense political atmosphere in the assembly at the time.

== Office held ==
Term Start	Office	Term end
2002	Member of the National Assembly	2018
2013	Minister of State for Water and Power	2017
2017	Minister of State for Power	2018
2019	Senior Vice-President of PML-N	incumbent
2025	Member of the Senate of Pakistan	2027
