= Mushtaq Ali Cheema =

Federal Minister for Textile Industry
- In office September 2004 – November 2007
- President: Pervez Musharraf

Member of the National Assembly of Pakistan
- In office November 2002 – November 2007
- Constituency: NA-83 (Faisalabad-IX)

Personal details
- Born: Faisalabad, Punjab, Pakistan
- Party: Pakistan Muslim League (Q)
- Education: Master's degree in Commerce
- Occupation: Politician, industrialist

Mushtaq Ali Cheema is a Pakistani politician and industrialist who served as a member of the National Assembly of Pakistan from 2002 to 2007. He was appointed Federal Minister for Textile Industry in September 2004 and held the position until November 2007 during the government of Prime Minister Shaukat Aziz.
