= Farrukh Habib =

Former Member Of National Assembly of Pakistan

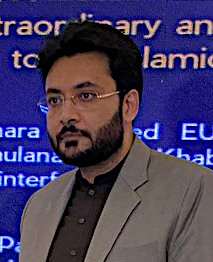
- Habib in 2019

State Minister for Information and Broadcasting
- In office 29 April 2021 – 10 April 2022
- President: Arif Alvi
- Prime Minister: Imran Khan
- Minister: Fawad Chaudhry

Parliamentary Secretary Railways
- In office 27 September 2018 – 28 April 2021
- President: Arif Alvi
- Prime Minister: Imran Khan

Member of the National Assembly of Pakistan
- In office 13 August 2018 – 11 April 2022
- Preceded by: Abid Sher Ali
- Succeeded by: Imran Khan; Changaiz Ahmed Khan Kakar
- Constituency: NA-108 (Faisalabad-VIII)

Personal details
- Born: 13 August 1980 (age 46) Faisalabad, Punjab, Pakistan

Mian Farrukh Habib Arshad (born 13 August 1980) is a Pakistani politician who had been a member of the National Assembly of Pakistan from August 2018 till July 2022 and former Minister of State for Information and Broadcasting from April 2021 till April 2022.

== Political career ==
He contested the 2013 Pakistani general election as a candidate of Pakistan Tehreek-e-Insaf (PTI) from Constituency NA-108 (Faisalabad-VIII). He was defeated by Abid Sher Ali of PMLN by a heavy margin of 67,523 Votes in that election.

He was elected to the National Assembly of Pakistan as a candidate of Pakistan Tehreek-e-Insaf (PTI) from Constituency NA-108 (Faisalabad-VIII) in the 2018 Pakistani general election.

On 27 September 2018, Prime Minister Imran Khan appointed him as Federal Parliamentary Secretary for Railways.

On 28 April 2021, Prime Minister Imran Khan appointed him as Minister of State for Information and Broadcasting.

He resign from the Parliament of Pakistan, National Assembly of Pakistan on 10 April 2022 after no-confidence motion against Imran Khan.

In October 2023, Farrukh Habib announced to quit PTI while addressing a press conference. He levelled serious allegations against Chairman PTI Imran Khan. He also joined IPP in that press conference.

== Corruption allegations ==
Farrukh Habib was summoned by the Federal Investigation Agency (FIA) on charges of corruption, fraud, embezzlement, and misuse of power. He is facing criminal proceedings on offenses that could result in 10 years' imprisonment if convicted.

The Anti-Corruption Establishment (ACE) Punjab has launched three inquiries against Pakistan Tehreek-e-Insaf (PTI) leader Farrukh Habib in February 2023.

ACE Punjab summoned Farrukh Habib to investigate his alleged involvement in three corruption cases. Habib had been summoned to Faisalabad on 11, 13, and 14 March 2023. He was again summoned on 4 April 2023 on charges of corruption in Public High Ways Department, Faisalabad.

The ACE Punjab officials claimed that Habib ‘illegally’ built a petrol pump on the land of the Railway Department, whereas he was allegedly involved in corruption during the years 2018 to 2022 in the Department of Parks and Horticulture. He is also alleged to have received high perks of bribery in different contracts of Faisalabad Development Authority.

== Parting ways with PTI ==
In October 2023, Farrukh Habib announced to quit PTI while addressing a press conference. He leveled serious allegations against Chairman PTI Imran Khan. He also joined the IPP in that press conference.
