= Rana Asif Tauseef =

Pakistani politician

Rana Asif Tauseef (born 1 July 1955 in Faisalabad, Punjab) is a Pakistani politician from Faisalabad who has served as a member of the National Assembly (MNA) after being elected in the 2002 general elections. He was a member of the Pakistan Muslim League (N) political party. In the 2008 general elections, he was again elected as an MNA, this time as a candidate from Pakistan Muslim League (Q). Asif is a businessman by profession and obtained his bachelor's degree in Commerce degree in 1991 from the Government Commerce College and an MBA degree in 1996 from the London School of Business Administration.

In May 2011, he assumed the post of Minister of State for Privatisation. His areas of expertise and interest include finance, commerce and industry. Asif has been a member of the National Assembly's committees on Culture, Sports, Tourism, Youth Affairs, Population Welfare, Foreign Affairs, Economic Affairs and Textile. His brother, Rana Zahid Tauseef, has also served as an MNA in the national parliament and has been a mayor of the city of Faisalabad.
