= Rana Sanaullah =

Pakistani politician (born 1955)

The Honourable Rana Sanaullah Minister
- رانا ثناء ﷲ
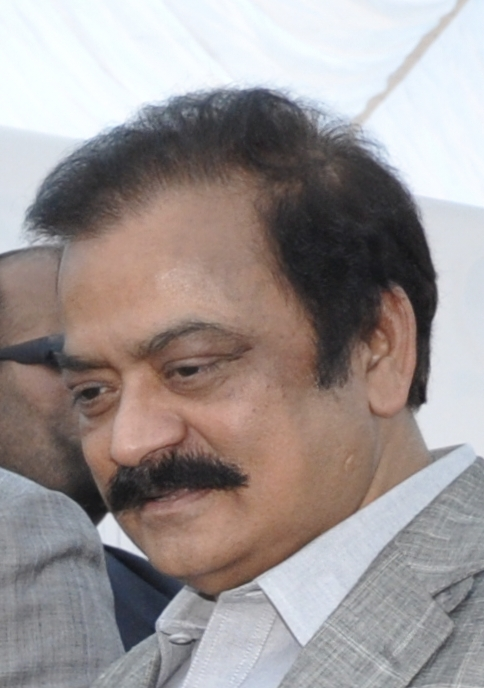
- Sanaullah Khan in 2015

Advisor to Prime Minister on Political and Public Affairs
- Incumbent
- Assumed office 30 April 2024
- President: Asif Ali Zardari
- Prime Minister: Shehbaz Sharif

Advisor to Prime Minister on Inter Provincial Coordination
- Incumbent
- Assumed office 22 May 2024
- President: Asif Ali Zardari
- Prime Minister: Shehbaz Sharif

39th Interior Minister of Pakistan
- In office 19 April 2022 – 10 August 2023
- Prime Minister: Shehbaz Sharif
- Preceded by: Sheikh Rasheed Ahmad
- Succeeded by: Sarfraz Bugti (caretaker)

Member of the National Assembly of Pakistan
- In office 13 August 2018 – 10 August 2023
- Constituency: NA-106 Faisalabad-VI

Provincial Minister of Punjab for Law and Parliamentary Affairs
- In office 11 June 2013 – 31 May 2018
- Chief Minister: Shehbaz Sharif
- In office 3 July 2008 – 17 March 2013
- Chief Minister: Shehbaz Sharif

Deputy Leader of the Opposition in Provincial Assembly of Punjab
- In office 2002 – 17 January 2007
- Speaker Assembly: Chaudhry Muhammad Afzal Sahi
- Leader of the Opposition: Qasim Zia
- In office 1990–1993
- Speaker Assembly: Mian Manzoor Ahmad Wattoo
- Leader of the Opposition: Rana Ikram Rabbani

Member of the Provincial Assembly of Punjab
- In office 25 November 2002 – 31 May 2018
- Constituency: PP-70 Faisalabad-XX
- In office 18 February 1997 – 12 October 1999
- Constituency: PP-59 Faisalabad
- In office 5 November 1990 – 28 June 1993
- Constituency: PP-59 Faisalabad

Personal details
- Born: Rana Sanaullah Khan; 1 January 1955 (age 71) Faisalabad, Punjab, Pakistan
- Party: PMLN (1993-present)
- Other political affiliations: PPP (1988-1993)
- Relations: Iftikhar Muhammad Chaudhry (cousin)
- Children: Ahmad Shehryar (son-in-law)

Rana Sanaullah Khan (Urdu: رانا ثناء ﷲ; born 1 January 1955) is a Pakistani lawyer and politician who is currently serving as a Senator since 2025 and Special Assistant to the Prime Minister on Political Affairs since April 2024. Previously, he served as the 39th Interior Minister of Pakistan in the first Shehbaz Sharif government. He is the second most popular official in the current Shehbaz Sharif government.

He was a member of the National Assembly of Pakistan from August 2018 to August 2023. He is a senior member of the PML-N and the president of the PML-N in Punjab since 4 May 2019. Before getting elected to the National Assembly of Pakistan, Sanaullah had been elected to the Provincial Assembly of Punjab five times and had served in high-ranking ministries of the province.

Previously, he served as the Law and Parliamentary Affairs Minister of Punjab from 2008 to 2018, Local Governments and Community Development Minister of Punjab from 2008 to 2014, Revenue Minister of Punjab from 2008 to 2013, Public Prosecution Minister of Punjab from 2008 to 2013, and the Deputy Leader of the Opposition (Punjab) from 1990 to 1993 and again from 2002 to November 2007.

== Early life and education ==
Rana Sanaullah Khan was born on 1 January 1955 to Sher Muhammad Khan in a Punjabi Rajput family. He received a bachelor's degree in commerce from Government College University Faisalabad and an LLB from Punjab Law College, Lahore.

He is a cousin of former Chief Justice of Pakistan Iftikhar Chaudhry.

== Political career ==
=== Pakistan People's Party ===
Rana Sanaullah was elected to the Provincial Assembly of the Punjab as a candidate of Pakistan Peoples Party (PPP) in the 1990 Pakistani general election.

=== Pakistan Muslim League (N) ===
He was re-elected to the Provincial Assembly of the Punjab as a candidate of Pakistan Muslim League (Nawaz) (PML-N) in the 1997 Pakistani general election.

He was re-elected to the Provincial Assembly of the Punjab from PP-70 (Faisalabad-XX) as a candidate of (PML-N) in the 2002 Pakistani general election. He was also elected as the leader of opposition of the Punjab Provincial Assembly. In 2003, he was allegedly abducted by the intelligence agency Inter-Services Intelligence (ISI) and was badly tortured for speaking against military regime. Different pictures published in different newspapers showed Rana without his signature moustache and a shaved head. His acquaintances claim that the torture resulted in such an everlasting effect that interrupted the natural process of hair growth and since then his hair didn't grow that bushy as before. When freed, he was subsequently shifted to DHQ hospital.

He was re-elected to the Provincial Assembly of the Punjab from PP-70 (Faisalabad-XX) as a candidate of (PML-N) in the 2008 Pakistani general election.

He was re-elected to the Provincial Assembly of the Punjab from PP-70 (Faisalabad-XX) as a candidate of (PML-N) in the 2013 Pakistani general election.

He was elected to the National Assembly of Pakistan from NA-106 (Faisalabad-VI) as a candidate of (PML-N) in the 2018 Pakistani general election.

He ran in the 2024 Pakistani General Election from NA-100 on PML-N Party ticket but was unsuccessful, he received 11,2639 votes against Dr Nisar Ahmed Jutt, an independent candidate who received 13,1941 votes.

=== Interior Minister ===
After dissolution of the government of Imran Khan through a no-confidence motion, he replaced Sheikh Rasheed Ahmed as Interior Minister. On 17 April 2022, he was appointed Federal Interior Minister of Pakistan in Shehbaz Sharif's cabinet.

=== Special Assistant to the Prime Minister on Political Affairs ===
In April 2024, the current President of Pakistan Asif Ali Zardari appointed him Special Assistant to the Prime Minister on Political Affairs.

== Political controversies ==
=== Alleged links with militant organizations ===
Salman Taseer, the Governor of Punjab who was himself assassinated in 2011 by Mumtaz Qadri, a militant Islamist, before his death accused the PML-N in general and Rana Sanaullah in particular of entertaining links with militant organizations such as the Sipah-e-Sahaba Pakistan (SSP), a group known to use violence against Pakistan's religious minorities, especially the Shi'as. Observers note that Taseer's security at the time of his death was in the hands of the PML-N, Shehbaz Sharif being the Chief Minister of the province while Rana Sanaullah was the Law Minister.

Rana Sanaullah met SSP's leader Maulana Ahmed Ludhianvi in February 2010, in his capacity as Law Minister and PML-N leader, arguing that the SSP "had a vast following and vote-bank and that its support made political sense", eventually justifying the electoral alliance between the PML-N and SSP. Christophe Jaffrelot goes further, saying that it's not only about political alliance for Rana Sanaullah but also ideological affinities, as during that campaign he "showed devotion to SSP heroes", having paid respect at the tombs of Haq Nawaz Jhangvi and Azam Tariq.

=== Warren Weinstein ===
In August 2011, he accused an American contractor in Pakistan Warren Weinstein of being an American spy although Weinstein had lived in Pakistan for seven years and there was no evidence that he was a spy. Weinstein went missing a week later and was accidentally killed in a January 2015 US drone strike on the Afghanistan-Pakistan border, as announced by U.S. President Barack Obama at a White House press conference on April 23, 2015.

=== Model Town incident ===
On 17 June 2014, Punjab Police raided the Minhaj-ul-Quran International's Lahore secretariat on the pretext of removing security barriers from its surroundings. Tahir-ul-Qadri's followers, who were preparing for his arrival from Canada to launch an anti-government movement on 23 June 2014, protested and deadly skirmishes started. A dozen of Tahir-ul-Qadri's devotees were killed including three women and around hundred got seriously wounded from bullet shots. Rana Sanaullah, who is considered only second to the Chief Minister, remained adamant that the police action was justified which added to the public fury.

In the wake of public reaction and opposition's criticism, Shahbaz Sharif sacked Rana Sanaullah as Law Minister, and Punjab's top bureaucrat. However, Qadri and other opposition leaders including Imran Khan held Shahbaz Sharif, Chief Minister of Punjab, responsible for the civilian deaths at the hands of police and demanded his resignation. FIR of Model Town tragedy was registered against key figures of the present government including the Prime Minister, the Chief Minister and Rana Sanaullah.

A joint-investigation-team (JIT) was later formed to investigate the incident. Exonerated by the government led JIT he was sworn in as Punjab Law Minister again in May 2015.

=== Narcotics case ===
When Sanaullah was travelling from Faisalabad to Lahore in July 2019, the Anti Narcotics Force (ANF) Lahore team detained him close to the Ravi Toll Plaza on the highway. Under Section 9(C) of the Control of Narcotic Substances Act of 1997, which contains the death penalty, life in prison, or a sentence that may last up to 14 years in jail, as well as a fine of up to Rs1 million, a first information report was filed.

According to the First Information Report (FIR), Sanaullah was allegedly involved in drug trafficking and was transporting heroin to Lahore. This information had been provided to the force. He was twice denied bail by the trial court, but on December 24, 2019, the Lahore High Court granted him liberty.

Sanaullah claimed on 10 December 2022 that the case against him was "concocted, designed, and created" after the multiple hearings. In the name of justice, equity, and fair play, he pleaded with the court to drop the charges against him. Sanaullah's lawyer informed the court that "Sanaullah had nothing to do with narcotics" and that "the case was a political ploy." He added that there were contradictions between the witness testimony and the camera footage.

Imtiaz Ahmed, Assistant Director of the ANF, and Inspector Ehsaan Azam rejected the accusations against him during the final hearing, calling them "false." Along with other petitioners, Sanaullah asserted that this was an instance of political victimization. They said that Pakistan Tehreek-e-Insaf (PTI) leader Fawad Chaudhry had explicitly stated that this case had not been filed during the administration of ousted primer minister Imran Khan and had instead been brought by "influential people" in the country.

Sanaullah was exonerated on December 10, 2022, by a special court in Lahore following multiple hearings and his submission of a plea.
