= 2018 Pakistani general election in Khyber Pakhtunkhwa =

- 25 July 2018

61 seats from Khyber Pakhtunkhwa in the National Assembly
- Opinion polls
- Turnout: 44.31%
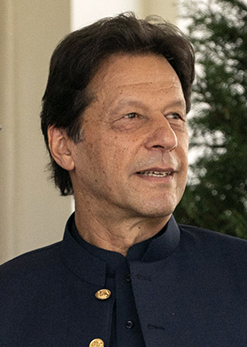

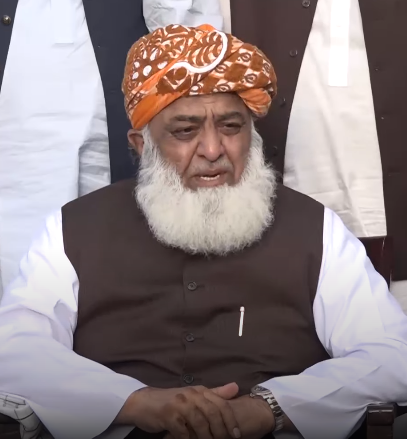

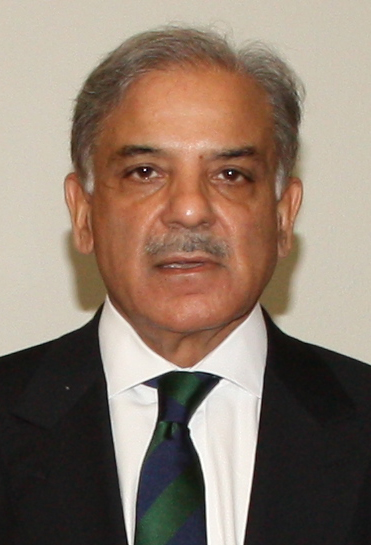

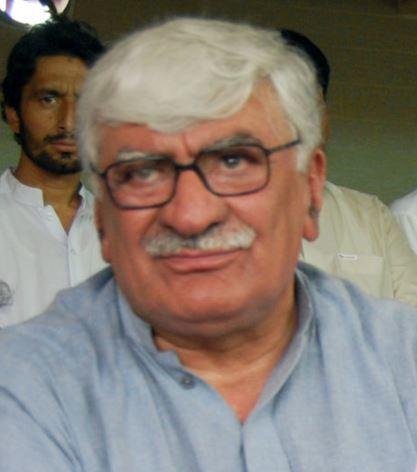

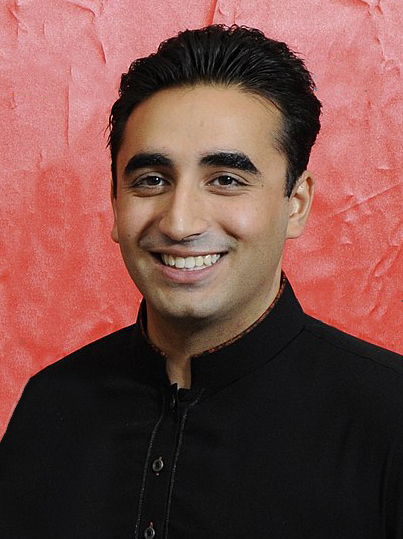
	First party	Second party	Third party
Leader	Imran Khan	Fazl-ur-Rahman	Shehbaz Sharif
Party	PTI	MMA	PML(N)
Leader since	25 April 1996	2017	13 March 2018
Leader's seat	Bannu (vacated)	Dera Ismail Khan-I (lost) Dera Ismail Khan-II (lost)	Swat-II (lost)
Last election	29.9%, 21 seats	24.6%, 13 seats	17.3%, 5 seats
Seats won	45	8	4
Seat change	▲24	▼5	▼1
Popular vote	3,155,950	1,514,683	854,493
Percentage	39.34%	18.88%	10.65%
Swing	▲9.44	▼5.72	▼6.65
	Fourth party	Fifth party
Leader	Asfandyar Wali	Bilawal Bhutto Zardari
Party	ANP	PPP
Leader since	2003	30 December 2007
Leader's seat	Charsadda-II (lost)	Malakand (lost)
Last election	7.6%, 1 seat	7.4%, 0 seats
Seats won	1	1
Seat change	Steady	▲1
Popular vote	747,779	603,248
Percentage	9.32%	7.52%
Swing	▲1.72	▲0.08
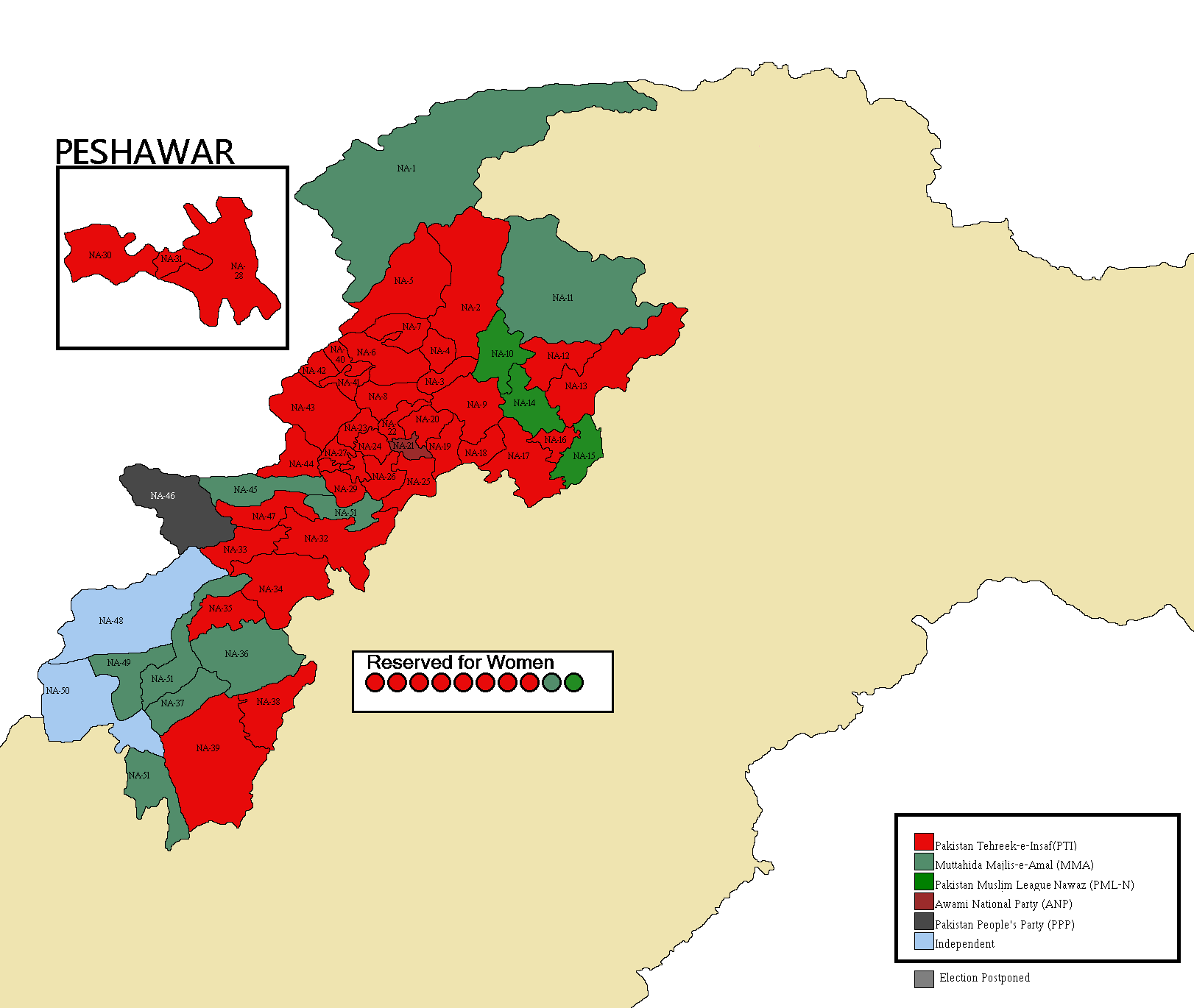

General elections were held in Khyber Pakhtunkhwa on Wednesday, 25 July 2018 to elect the 51 members of 15th National Assembly from Khyber Pakhtunkhwa. The Pakistan Tehreek-e-Insaf (PTI) obtained a landslide victory in the province by winning 37 general seats and increased their margin of victory from 2013. The PTI also won 8 out of 10 reserved seats while the Pakistan Muslim League (N) (PML-N) and Muttahida Majlis-e-Amal (MMA) won 1 reserved seat each.

== Background ==
In the 2013 elections, the PTI emerged as the largest party in the province. The Pashtun nationalist and socialist Awami National Party (ANP) was reduced to only 1 seat because of allegations of corruption and poor leadership.

In 2017, Jamaat-e-Islami (JI) and Jamiat Ulema-e-Islam (F) (JUI-F) announced to restore Muttahida Majlis-e-Amal, an electoral alliance of Islamist Parties. This alliance was created to reduce vote bank of the PTI.

In May 2018, JI pulled out its support for the PTI-led provincial government just before the General Elections. They blamed the PTI for the fact that JI was asked for support in the elections for the Chairman of the Senate. This statement was strongly condemned by the PTI.

Imran Khan, the chairman of the PTI, showed support for a merger of the Federally Administered Tribal Areas (FATA) with Khyber Pakhtunkhwa. He also demanded to close the FATA Secretariat and also threatened to start a countrywide protest if FATA was not merged. The goal of merging FATA with Khyber Pakhtunkhwa was to ensure the function of Law enforcement authorities like the Judiciary and Police, Bureaucracy and other Provincial and Federal institutions like Health, Local Government, and Education may also function in the region like in the rest of Pakistan.

JUI(F) strongly condemned this merger but many political parties including the people of Khyber Pakhtunkhwa showed support for a future merger.

In May 2018, FATA was merged with Khyber Pakhtunkhwa with the approval of legislators in the Parliament, Provincial Assembly and the President.

The seats for Khyber Pakhtunkhwa in the National Assembly were increased from 35 to 39 general seats and from 8 to 10 reserved seats for women due to the 2017 Census of Pakistan. After the merger of FATA with the province, its seats were further increased to 51.

== Campaign ==
After the dissolution of the National Assembly and the Provincial Assembly, political parties started their election campaigns in Khyber Pakhtunkhwa.

=== Pakistan Tehreek-e-Insaf ===
Pakistan Tehreek-e-Insaf (PTI) launched its campaign in Khyber Pakhtunkhwa by contesting every seat except for NA-50 (South Waziristan-II). Imran Khan, the chairman of the PTI, announced that he would be contesting from NA-35 (Bannu). The PTI also expelled 20 MPAs from the party for selling their votes in the Senate Elections, which increased their popularity. The PTI enjoyed massive crowds in their political rallies in Peshawar, Mardan, Swabi, Charsadda, Swat, Bannu, Abbottabad and Haripur. Opinion surveys showed that the PTI would emerge highly successful in not only Khyber Pakhtunkhwa, but also in Hazara Division, which was considered as a strong hold of the PML(N).

=== Muttahida Majlis-e-Amal ===
Muttahida Majlis-e-Amal (MMA) started its campaign by contesting 47 seats in the province. Fazal-ur-Rehman, president of the MMA, contested from NA-38 (Dera Ismail Khan-I) and NA-39 (Dera Ismail Khan-II), while Siraj-ul Haq, leader of Jamaat-e-Islami (JI) and Deputy Leader of the MMA, contested from NA-7 (Lower Dir-II). In NA-3 (Swat-II), the MMA announced its support for Shehbaz Sharif, a candidate of the PML(N).

The MMA held large political rallies in Malakand and Peshawar.

=== Pakistan Muslim League (Nawaz) ===
The Pakistan Muslim League (N) (PML(N)) contested 42 seats. Shehbaz Sharif, leader of the PML(N), contested NA-3 (Swat-II) and Provincial President Amir Muqam contested NA-2 (Swat-I) and NA-29 (Peshawar-III).

The PML(N) held rallies in Mardan, Swat, Mansehra and Haripur.

=== Awami National Party ===
The Awami National Party (ANP), a Pashtun nationalist and socialist party, contested 41 Seats in the province under the leadership of Asfandyar Wali Khan. Khan Contested NA-24 (Charsadda-II) while other seniors leaders, such as Ghulam Ahmed Bilour and Haider Khan Hoti contested from NA-31 (Peshawar-V) and NA-21 (Mardan-II), respectively.

=== Other Political Parties ===
Other smaller and regional parties also launched their campaigns a well. Aftab Ahmed Sherpao, leader of the Qaumi Watan Party (QWP), contested from NA-23 (Charsadda-I). Bilawal Bhutto Zardari, the chairman of the Pakistan People’s Party (PPP), contested from NA-8 (Malakand).

For the first time, political parties started campaigns in the former Tribal Districts. The people living in these districts gave positive response to political workers and National Assembly candidates.

== Results ==
Vote Share of different parties in the election.
1. PTI (39.3%)
2. MMA (18.9%)
3. PML-N (10.7%)
4. ANP (9.32%)
5. PPP (7.52%)
6. Other Parties (3.47%)
7. IND (10.8%)
Seat Share of different parties in the election.
1. PTI (73.8%)
2. MMA (13.1%)
3. PML-N (6.55%)
4. ANP (1.64%)
5. PPP (1.64%)
6. IND (3.28%)

Party	Votes	%	Seats		
Party	Votes	%	General	Women	Total
Pakistan Tehreek-e-Insaf	3,155,950	39.34	37	8	45
Muttahida Majlis-e-Amal	1,514,683	18.88	7	1	8
Pakistan Muslim League (N)	854,493	10.65	3	1	4
Awami National Party	747,779	9.32	1	0	1
Pakistan Peoples Party	603,248	7.52	1	0	1
Other parties	278,004	3.47	0	0	0
Independents	867,655	10.82	2	0	2
Total	8,021,812	100.00	51	10	61
Valid votes	8,021,812	96.65			
Invalid/blank votes	277,834	3.35			
Total votes	8,299,646	100.00			
Registered voters/turnout	18,729,510	44.31			
Source: Election Pakistani

=== By constituency ===
Division	Assembly Constituency	Winner				Runner-up				Margin		Turnout
Division	Assembly Constituency	Candidate	Party	Votes		Candidate	Party	Votes		Margin		Turnout
Division	Assembly Constituency	Candidate	Party	No.	%	Candidate	Party	No.	%	No.	%	%
Malakand	NA-1 Chitral	Abdul Akbar Chitrali	MMA	49,035	29.65	Abdul Latif	PTI	38,819	43.27	10,216	6.18	61.36
Malakand	NA-2 Swat-I	Haider Ali Khan	PTI	61,834	37.14	Amir Muqam	PML-N	41,366	24.84	20,468	12.29	43.48
Malakand	NA-3 Swat-II	Saleem Rehman	PTI	68,280	42.02	Shebaz Sharif	PML-N	22,758	14.01	45,522	28.02	40.50
Malakand	NA-4 Swat-III	Murad Saeed	PTI	71,663	44.51	Saleem Khan	ANP	31,209	19.39	40,454	25.13	39.36
Malakand	NA-5 Upper Dir	Sahibzada Sibghatullah	PTI	66,654	30.71	Sahabzada Tariq Ullah	MMA	58,307	26.86	8,347	3.85	48.52
Malakand	NA-6 Lower Dir-I	Mehboob Shah	PTI	63,717	36.54	Asad Ullah	MMA	37,687	21.61	26,030	14.93	49.65
Malakand	NA-7 Lower Dir-II	Bashir Khan	PTI	63,071	42.81	Siraj-ul-Haq	MMA	46,927	31.85	16,144	10.96	44.57
Malakand	NA-8 Malakand	Junaid Akbar	PTI	81,788	43.59	Bilawal Bhutto	PPP	44,091	23.50	37,697	20.09	48.56
Malakand	NA-9 Buner	Sher Akbar Khan	PTI	58,317	31.59	Kamran Khan	PML-N	39,213	21.24	19,104	10.35	41.44
Malakand	NA-10 Shangla	Ibadullah	PML-N	35,178	26.83	Sadid-ur-Rehman	ANP	33,650	25.67	1,528	1.17	35.02
Hazara	NA-11 Kohistan	Afreen Khan	MMA	16,480	25.34	Dost Muhammad Shakir	IND	14,536	22.35	1,944	2.99	42.07
Hazara	NA-12 Battagram	Nawaz Khan	PTI	35,120	37.57	Qari Muhammad Yousuf	MMA	24,307	26.00	10,813	11.57	36.21
Hazara	NA-13 Mansehra-I	Saleh Muhammad	PTI	1,08,950	41.43	Shahjahan Yousuf	PML-N	1,07,114	40.74	1,836	0.70	49.90
Hazara	NA-14 Mansehra-cum-Torghar	Muhammad Sajjad	PML-N	75,220	35.31	Zar Gul Khan	PTI	59,918	28.13	15,302	7.18	41.69
Hazara	NA-15 Abbottabad-I	Murtaza Javed Abbasi	PML-N	95,348	39.32	Ali Asghar Khan	PTI	82,073	33.85	13,275	5.47	50.69
Hazara	NA-16 Abbottabad-II	Ali Khan Jadoon	PTI	85,763	47.50	Mohabat Khan	PML-N	55,102	30.52	30,661	16.98	50.10
Hazara	NA-17 Haripur	Omar Ayub Khan	PTI	1,73,125	50.26	Babar Nawaz Khan	PML-N	1,33,158	38.66	39,967	11.60	52.38
Mardan	NA-18 Swabi-I	Asad Qaiser	PTI	79,428	40.47	Fazal Ali Haqqani	MMA	34,684	17.67	44,744	22.80	43.72
Mardan	NA-19 Swabi-II	Usman Khan Tarakai	PTI	84,489	39.58	Waris Khan	ANP	54,080	25.33	30,409	14.24	46.05
Mardan	NA-20 Mardan-I	Mujahid Ali	PTI	78,188	40.17	Gul Nawaz Khan	ANP	38,741	19.91	39,447	20.27	45.20
Mardan	NA-21 Mardan-II	Haider Hoti	ANP	79,151	41.00	Atif Khan	PTI	78,999	40.92	152	0.08	45.99
Mardan	NA-22 Mardan-III	Ali Muhammad Khan	PTI	58,652	29.06	Maulana Muhammad Qasim	MMA	56,587	28.04	2,065	1.02	51.80
Peshawar	NA-23 Charsadda-I	Anwar Taj	PTI	61,911	33.42	Zafar Ullah Khan	MMA	43,541	23.50	18,370	9.92	44.38
Peshawar	NA-24 Charsadda-II	Fazal Muhammad Khan	PTI	83,596	39.72	Asfandyar Wali	ANP	59,809	28.42	23,787	11.30	45.41
Peshawar	NA-25 Nowshera-I	Pervaiz Khattak	PTI	82,208	44.42	Khan Pervaiz	PPP	35,661	19.27	46,547	25.15	48.83
Peshawar	NA-26 Nowshera-II	Imran Khattak	PTI	90,298	47.94	Jamal Khan Khattak	ANP	47,124	25.02	43,174	22.92	49.92
Peshawar	NA-27 Peshawar-I	Noor Alam Khan	PTI	71,242	46.04	Haji Ghulam Ali	MMA	39,358	25.43	31,884	20.60	45.87
Peshawar	NA-28 Peshawar-II	Arbab Amir Ayub	PTI	74,525	49.44	Sabir Hussain Awan	MMA	27,395	18.17	47,130	31.26	44.79
Peshawar	NA-29 Peshawar-III	Nasir Khan Mosazai	PTI	49,779	38.21	Naeem Jan	MMA	29,415	22.58	20,364	15.63	40.67
Peshawar	NA-30 Peshawar-IV	Sher Ali Arbab	PTI	73,885	58.75	Arbab Najeebullah Khan	MMA	18,197	14.47	55,688	44.28	40.72
Peshawar	NA-31 Peshawar-V	Shaukat Ali	PTI	87,975	53.37	Ghulam Ahmed Bilour	ANP	42,526	25.80	45,449	27.57	42.24
Kohat	NA-32 Kohat	Shehryar Afridi	PTI	82,952	41.73	Gohar Muhamad Khan Bangash	MMA	47,825	24.06	35,127	17.67	39.23
Kohat	NA-33 Hangu	Khial Zaman	PTI	28,882	35.30	Atiq ur Rehman	MMA	28,154	34.41	728	0.89	29.65
Kohat	NA-34 Karak	Shahid Ahmed Khattak	PTI	77,270	38.37	Mir Zakim Khan	MMA	28,548	14.18	48,722	24.20	49.79
Bannu	NA-35 Bannu	Imran Khan	PTI	1,13,843	46.21	Akram Durrani	MMA	1,06,842	43.37	7,001	2.84	42.56
Bannu	NA-36 Lakki Marwat	Muhammad Anwar	MMA	91,396	43.34	Ishfaq Ahmed Khan	PTI	81,859	38.82	9,537	4.52	50.06
D I Khan	NA-37 Tank	Asad Mehmood	MMA	28,563	35.62	Habib Ullah Khan	PTI	16,659	20.77	11,904	14.84	44.34
D I Khan	NA-38 D I Khan-I	Ali Amin Gandapur	PTI	81,032	37.41	Fazal-ur-Rehman	MMA	45,796	21.15	35,236	16.27	55.31
D I Khan	NA-39 D I Khan-II	Muhammad Yaqub Sheikh	PTI	79,672	47.73	Fazal-ur-Rehman	MMA	52,327	31.35	27,345	16.37	50.83
Former FATA	NA-40 Bajaur-I	Gul Dad Khan	PTI	34,683	32.97	Sardar Khan	IND	18,025	17.13	16,658	15.83	41.16
Former FATA	NA-41 Bajaur-II	Gul Zafar Khan	PTI	22,767	25.03	Qari Abdul Majeed	IND	14,960	16.45	7,807	8.58	38.35
Former FATA	NA-42 Mohmand	Sajid Khan	PTI	22,742	24.45	Bilal Rehman	IND	21,106	22.69	1,636	1.76	36.11
Former FATA	NA-43 Khyber-I	Noor-ul-Haq Qadri	PTI	33,871	38.98	Shahjee Gul Afridi	IND	30,428	35.02	3,443	3.96	38.34
Former FATA	NA-44 Khyber-II	Muhammad Iqbal Khan	PTI	12,580	18.61	Hameed Ullah Jan	IND	9,184	13.58	3,396	5.02	25.49
Former FATA	NA-45 Kurram-I	Munir Orakzai	MMA	16,255	28.03	Said Jamal	PTI	13,495	23.27	2,760	4.76	35.07
Former FATA	NA-46 Kurram-II	Sajid Hussain Turi	PPP	21,506	28.76	Syed Iqbal Manan	PTI	17,004	22.74	4,502	6.02	43.35
Former FATA	NA-47 Orakzai	Jawad Hussain	PTI	11,523	20.55	Qasim Gul	MMA	6,988	12.46	4,535	8.09	33.53
Former FATA	NA-48 North Waziristan	Mohsin Dawar	IND	16,526	25.80	Misbah Uddin	MMA	15,363	23.98	1,163	1.82	23.36
Former FATA	NA-49 South Waziristan-I	Muhammad Jamal Ud din	MMA	7,778	20.93	Dost Muhammad Khan	PTI	6,591	17.74	1,187	3.19	20.84
Former FATA	NA-50 South Waziristan-II	Ali Wazir	IND	23.589	48.85	Tariq Gilani	IND	8,254	17.09	15,335	31.76	33.10
Former FATA	NA-51 Frontier Regions	Abdul Shakor	MMA	21,962	31.26	Qaiser Jamal	PTI	18,754	26.70	3,208	4.57	42.16

=== Notable Losses ===
Results from Khyber Pakhtunkhwa surprised the country as many Party Leaders and famous politicians lost by huge margin.

Fazal-ur-Rehman Leader of Jamiat Ulema-e-Islam F and President of Muttahida Majlis-e-Amal lost from both NA-38 and NA-39 Dera Ismail Khan by 35,236 and 27,345 votes by Pakistan Tehreek-e-Insaf Candidates.

Shehbaz Sharif Leader of Pakistan Muslim League N lost from NA-3 Swat by 45,522 votes by Pakistan Tehreek-e-Insaf candidate.

Bilawal Bhutto Zardari Leader of Pakistan People's Party lost from NA-8 Malakand by 37,697 votes by Pakistan Tehreek-e-Insaf candidate.

Asfandyar Wali Khan Leader of Awami National Party and Grandson of Abdul Ghaffar Khan lost from NA-24 Charsadda by 23,787 votes by Pakistan Tehreek-e-Insaf candidate.

Ghulam Ahmed Bilour another prominent Leader of Awami National Party lost from NA-31 Peshawar by 45,449 votes by Pakistan Tehreek-e-Insaf candidate.

Siraj ul Haq Leader of Jamat-e-Islami and deputy Leader of Muttahida Majlis-e-Amal lost from the strong hold of NA-7 Lower Dir by 16,114 votes by Pakistan tehreek-e-Insaf Candidate.

Amir Muqam President of Pakistan Muslim League N Khyber Pakhtunkhwa Chapter lost from both NA-2 Swat and NA-29 Peshawar by 20,468 votes and stood 4th in NA-29 Peshawar by Pakistan Tehreek-e-Insaf Candidates.

Aftab Sherpao Leader of Qaumi Watan Party lost from NA-23 Charsadda by Pakistan Tehreek-e-Insaf Candidate and stood on 3rd Position.

Atif Khan Provincial Minister of Khyber Pakhtunkhwa and one of the leaders of Pakistan Tehreek-e-Insaf lost from NA-21 Mardan by Awami National Party Candidate and former Chief Minister Haider Hoti by just 152 votes.

Akram Khan Durrani former Chief Minister of Khyber Pakhtunkhwa and one of the leaders of Muttahida Majlis-e-Amal lost from NA-35 Bannu by 7001 votes by Pakistan Tehreek-e-Insaf Leader Imran Khan.
