= Mehboob Ullah Jan =

Pakistani politician

Member of the National Assembly of Pakistan
- In office 2008–2013
- Constituency: NA-23 (Kohistan)

Personal details
- Party: IND (2025-present)
- Other political affiliations: PPP (2023-2025); PML(Q) (2002-2008; 2018-2023); JUI (F) (2013-2018)

Mehboob Ullah Jan is a Pakistani politician and social worker. He was a member of the National Assembly of Pakistan from 2008 to 2013. He was born in 1968 in Kohistan and is the younger brother of late Maulana Abdul Baqi, ex provincial minister and late Maulana Ubaidullah, who was an MPA in the KPK assembly. Mr Jan is known as a champion of freedom of democracy due to him opposing the recurring local alliances being made in the kohistan district. He has a degree in law and is also known for his hard work in his constituency and resilience. He received 10,630 votes and lost the seat to Abdul Halim Khan.

He was elected to the National Assembly from Constituency NA-23 (Kohistan) as an independent candidate in the 2008 Pakistani general election and later joined Pakistan People's Party (PPP). He received 14,100 votes and defeated Haji Misar Khan, a candidate of the PPP.

He quit PPP and joined Jamiat Ulema-e Islam (F) (JUI-F) before running for the seat of the National Assembly as a candidate of JUI-F from Constituency NA-23 (Kohistan) in the 2013 Pakistani general election. He received 12,337 votes and lost the seat to Sar Zamin Khan the candidate of the local alliance PKI.

He quit JUI-F and rejoined the PML(Q) before running for the seat of the National Assembly as the party's candidate from NA-11 (Kohistan-cum-Lower Kohistan-cum-Kolai Palas Kohistan) in the 2018 Pakistani general election. He received 12,627 votes and lost the seat to Afreen Khan, a candidate of the Muttahida Majlis-e-Amal (MMA).

He quit PML(Q) and rejoined the PPP on 28 January 2023. He participated in the 2024 general elections and despite more than 6 local alliances in the district, received 21,087 votes and lost the seat to Muhammad Idrees, a candidate of a local alliance, JALKOT QAUMI ITTEHAD, by a mere 6,000 margin.
