= Kabal, Pakistan =

Kabal: کبل (Pashto); کبل (Urdu)
- City
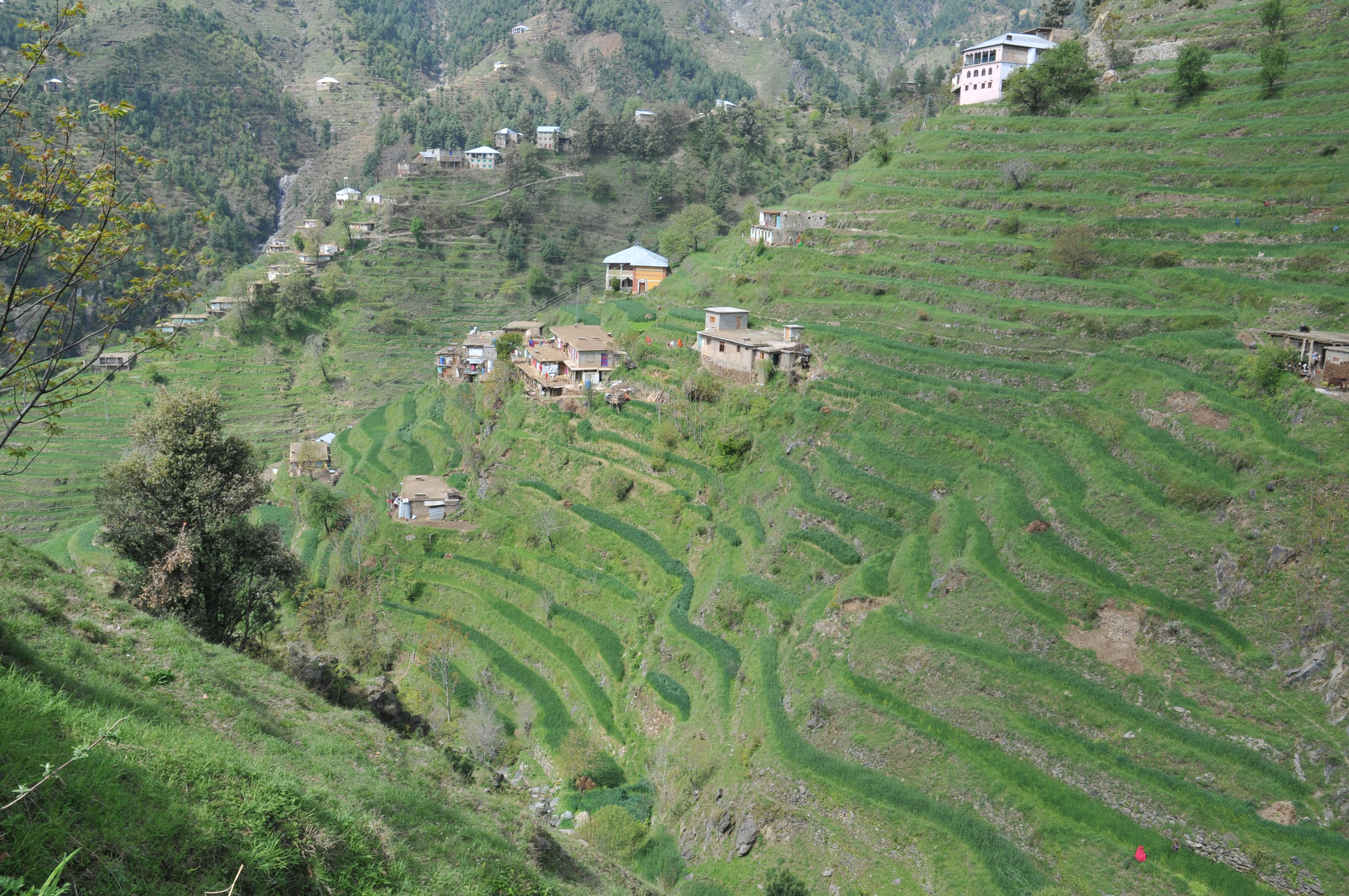

- Location within Khyber Pakhtunkhwa Location within Pakistan
- Coordinates: 34°47′N 72°17′E
- Country: Pakistan
- Province: Khyber Pakhtunkhwa
- District: Swat
- Tehsil: Kabal

Government
  - Type: Tehsil Municipal Administration
  - Tehsil Chairman: Saeed Ahmad Khan (PTI)
  - TMO: Nisar Khan
- Elevation: 845 m (2,772 ft)

Population (2023)
  - City: 132,549
  - Rank: 90th in Pakistan
- Time zone: UTC+5 (PST)

Kabal (Urdu and Pashto: کبل) is a city in Swat District, Khyber-Pakhtunkhwa province of Pakistan located 10 kilometres (6 mi) from Mingora city. The old name of Kabal was Chendakhwara. It is the tenth largest city in Khyber Pakhtunkhwa and 90th largest in Pakistan by population

Kabal city is located at 34°47′N 72°17′E at an altitude of 870 metres (2,854 ft).

Nearby settlements include the villages of Kotlai and Akhun Kalai.

== Demographics ==
=== Population ===
Historical population

Year	Pop.	±% p.a.
1998	75,891	—
2017	118,103	+2.35%

Year	Pop.	±% p.a.
2023	132,549	+1.94%

According to 2023 census, Kabal had a population of 132,549.

=== Languages ===
Languages of Kabal city (2023 Census)
1. Pashto (99.0%)
2. Urdu (0.10%)
3. Others (0.90%)
