= Elections in Khyber Pakhtunkhwa =

Elections in Khyber Pakhtunkhwa, a province of Pakistan are conducted in accordance with the Constitution of Pakistan. The Assembly of Khyber Pakhtunkhwa creates laws regarding the conduct of local body elections unilaterally while any changes by the Provincial Assembly to the conduct of Provincial elections need to be approved by the Parliament of Pakistan. Election Commission of Pakistan is responsible of conducting Elections in Khyber Pakhtunkhwa.

Khyber Pakhtunkhwa is Represented by 55 MNA's in National Assembly which include 45 General Seats and 10 Women Seats. In Senate of Pakistan Khyber Pakhtunkhwa is Represented by 23 Senators which include 14 General Seats, 4 Technocrat/Ulema Seats, 4 Women Seats, and 1 Seat for Non-Muslims.

Provincial Assembly of Khyber Pakhtunkhwa is the unicameral legislature of Khyber Pakhtunkhwa. Khyber Pakhtunkhwa Assembly consists of 145 Members which include 115 General Seats, 26 Women Seats, and 4 Non-Muslim Seats.

== Political parties ==
Pakistan Tehreek-e-Insaf (PTI) is the major political party in Khyber Pakhtunkhwa. Jamiat Ulema-e-Islam(F), Awami National Party are minor political parties of the Province. Pakistan Muslim League Nawaz (PML-N) Jamat-e-Islami (JI) and Pakistan People's Party (PPP) also has minor support in the Province.

== General Elections ==
1970 Pakistani general election in North-West Frontier Province
Party	Seats		
Party	General	Women	Total
Pakistan Muslim League (Qayyum)	7	1	8
Jamiat Ulema-e-Islam	6	0	6
National Awami Party (Wali)	3	0	3
Pakistan Peoples Party	1	0	1
Jamaat-e-Islami Pakistan	1	0	1
Total	18	1	19

2018 Pakistani general election in Khyber Pakhtunkhwa
Party	Seats		
Party	General	Women	Total
Pakistan Tehreek-e-Insaf	36	8	44
Muttahida Majlis-e-Amal	7	1	8
Pakistan Muslim League (N)	3	1	4
Awami National Party	1	0	1
Pakistan Peoples Party	1	0	1
Independents	3	0	3
Total	51	10	61

== Provincial Elections ==
1970 North-West Frontier Province provincial election
Party	Seats		
Party	General	Women	Total
National Awami Party (Wali)	13	1	14
Pakistan Muslim League (Qayyum)	11	1	12
Jamiat Ulema-e-Islam	4	0	4
Pakistan Peoples Party	3	0	3
Convention Muslim League	2	0	2
Jamaat-e-Islami Pakistan	1	0	1
Independents	6	0	6
Total	40	2	42

2002 North-West Frontier Province provincial election
Party	Seats			
Party	General	Women	Non-Muslims	Total
Muttahida Majlis-e-Amal	52	13	1	65
Pakistan Peoples party(Sherpao)	10	2	1	13
Awami National Party	8	2	0	10
Pakistan Peoples Party	8	2	0	10
Pakistan Muslim League (Q)	8	2	0	10
Pakistan Muslim League (N)	4	1	0	5
Pakistan Tehreek-e-Insaf	1	0	0	1
Independents	8	0	0	8
Elections postponed	0	0	1	1
Total	99	22	3	124

2008 North-West Frontier Province provincial election
Party	Seats				
Party	General	Ind joined	Women	Non-Muslims	Total
Awami National Party	33	5	9	1	48
Pakistan Peoples Party	18	5	6	1	30
Muttahida Majlis-e-Amal	11	0	3	1	15
Pakistan Muslim League (N)	5	2	2	0	9
Qaumi Watan Party	5	0	1	0	6
Pakistan Muslim League (Q)	5	0	1	0	6
Independents	10	0	0	0	10
Total	87	12	22	3	124

2018 Khyber Pakhtunkhwa provincial election
Party	Seats			
Party	General	Women	Non-Muslims	Total
Pakistan Tehreek-e-Insaf	66	16	2	84
Muttahida Majlis-e-Amal	10	2	1	13
Awami National Party	7	2	0	9
Pakistan Muslim League (N)	5	1	0	6
Pakistan Peoples Party	3	1	0	4
Independents	6	0	0	6
Elections postponed	2	0	0	2
Total	99	22	3	124
