= Amjad Ali Khan (Pakistani politician) =

Member of the National Assembly of Pakistan from Swat (2024–2029)

- امجد علی خان

Member of the National Assembly of Pakistan
- Incumbent
- Assumed office 29 February 2024
- Constituency: NA-2 Swat-I

Personal details
- Party: PTI (2024-present)
- Other political affiliations: PPP (2018)

Amjad Ali Khan (Urdu: امجد علی خان), is a Pakistani politician who is member of the National Assembly of Pakistan since February 2024.

== Political career ==
Khan won the 2024 Pakistani general election from NA-2 Swat-I as an Independent candidate. He received 88,938 votes while runner up Amir Muqam of Pakistan Muslim League (N) received 37,764 votes.
