= Dewlai =

Deolai
- Town
- ديولئ
- Country: Pakistan
- Province: Khyber Pakhtunkhwa
- District: Swat

Population (2017)
  - Total: 30,093
- Time zone: UTC+5 (PST)

Deolai (Urdu and Pashto: ديولئ) is a union council of the Swat district of the Khyber Pakhtunkhwa province in Pakistan. It is a part of Kabal Tehsil and is situated approximately 22.1 kilometers away (via Shahderai road) from Saidu Sharif, the district headquarters of Swat. Nekpikhel Yousafzai are the well known tribe of Deolai.
