= Muzafer-ul-Mulk =

Pakistani politician

Member of the National Assembly of Pakistan
- In office 2008–2013
- Constituency: NA-29 (Swat-I)

Personal details
- Party: Pakistan Muslim League (N) (since 2023)
- Other political affiliations: Awami National Party (2002-2023)

Muzafer-ul-Mulk is a Pakistani politician who had been a member of the National Assembly of Pakistan from 2008 to 2013.

== Political career ==
He was elected to the National Assembly of Pakistan from Constituency NA-29 (Swat-I) as a candidate of Awami National Party (ANP) in the 2008 Pakistani general election. He received 19,860 votes and defeated an independent candidate, Mian Gul Adnan Aurangzeb. He was criticized for his poor performance during his tenure as Member of the National Assembly.

He ran for the seat of the National Assembly from Constituency NA-29 (Swat-I) as a candidate of ANP in the 2013 Pakistani general election but was unsuccessful. He received 14,690 voted and lost the seat to Murad Saeed.
