= Syed Alla-ud-din Khan =

Pakistani politician

Syed Allauddin Khan
- سید علاؤالدین خان

Member of the National Assembly of Pakistan
- In office 2008–2013
- Preceded by: Fazal-e-Subhan
- Succeeded by: Salim Rehman
- Constituency: NA-30 (Swat-II)

Deputy Speaker of the Provincial Assembly of Khyber Pakhtunkhwa
- In office 1993–1996

Personal details
- Born: 2 February 1951 (age 75)
- Party: Pakistan Peoples Party
- Education: University of Peshawar

Syed Alla-ud-din Khan is a Pakistani politician who has been a member of the National Assembly of Pakistan from 2008 to 2013, representing the constituency NA-30 (Swat-II) as a member of Pakistan Peoples Party. He ran for a re-election in 2013, but lost to Salim Rehman of Pakistan Tehreek-e-Insaf.

== Early life and education ==
Khan was born on 2 February 1951 in Swat, NWFP (now Khyber Pakhtunkhwa). In 1974, he completed his MSc Physics from the University of Peshawar, and did his LLB from the same institution in 1977.

A lawyer by profession, he has twice served as the President of the Swat District Bar Association. He was elected as a member of the Swat District Council in 1983, and became its chairman in 1987.

== Political career ==
Khan joined the Pakistan Peoples Party in the early 1990s. He was elected as an MPA of the NWFP Assembly in 1993, and served as the Deputy Speaker of the Assembly from 1993 to 1996.

He ran for the seat of the Khyber Pakhtunkhwa Assembly as a candidate of Pakistan Peoples Party (Sherpao) (PPP-S) from Constituency PF-88 (Swat-VII) in the 2002 Pakistani general election, but was unsuccessful. He received 5,383 votes and lost the seat to Mufti Hussain Ahmad, a candidate of Muttahida Majlis-e-Amal (MMA).

He was elected to the National Assembly of Pakistan from Constituency NA-30 (Swat-II) as a candidate of Pakistan Peoples Party (PPP) in the 2008 Pakistani general election. He received 24,063 votes and defeated Shujaat Ali Khan, a candidate of Pakistan Muslim League (Q) (PML-Q).

He ran for the seat of the National Assembly from Constituency NA-30 (Swat-II) as a candidate of PPP in the 2013 Pakistani general election but was unsuccessful. He received 16,373 votes and lost the seat to Salim Rehman.
