= Traffic collisions in Pakistan =

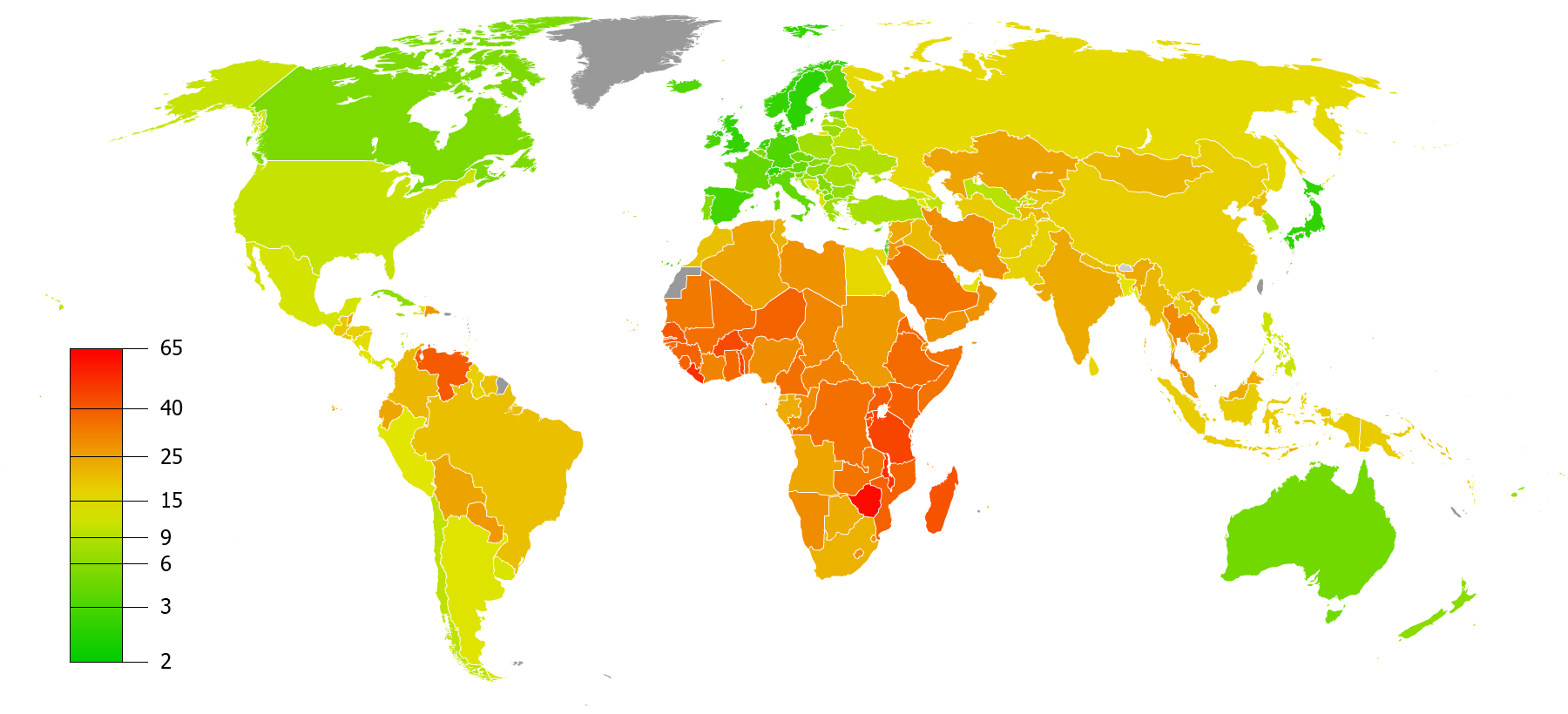
Death rates from road traffic collisions by country, per 100,000 inhabitants, world map (WHO 2012). Pakistan's traffic fatality rate was about 11.9 per 100,000 people as of 2023. (Note: The following groupings/assumptions were made: France includes the overseas departments as well as overseas collectivities.; The United Kingdom includes the Crown dependencies as well as the overseas territories.; The United States of America includes the insular areas.; The Netherlands includes Aruba and the Netherlands Antilles.; Denmark includes Greenland and the Faroe islands.; China includes the SARs of Hong Kong and Macao.) fewer than 5 5-10 10-15 15-20 20-25 25-30 30-35 35-40 more than 40

Traffic collisions in Pakistan are among the highest in the world, with thousands of lives lost and many severely injured each year. In 2021 alone, 10,379 road accidents resulted in some 5,608 fatalities. Former Minister of Communications, Murad Saeed, stated that "in Pakistan, a person is killed or severely injured in a road accident every five minutes." Pakistan also ranks first in Asia for most deaths caused by traffic accidents. Additionally, Karachi also ranks 4th globally for cities with the highest road accident fatalities. Major causes include reckless driving, poor road conditions, and inadequate traffic management.

== Statistics ==
Traffic accidents in Pakistan by year
Year	Total number of accidents	Accident		Persons		Total number of vehicles involved
Year	Total number of accidents	Fatal	Non-fatal	Killed	Injured	Total number of vehicles involved
2006-07	10,466	4,535	5,931	5,465	12,875	11,481
2007-08	10,466	4,610	5,856	5,615	12,096	11,456
2008-09	9,496	4,145	5,351	4,907	11,037	10,322
2009-10	9,747	4,378	5,369	5,280	11,173	10,496
2010-11	9,723	4,280	5,443	5,271	11,383	10,822
2011-12	9,140	3,966	5,174	4,758	10,145	9,986
2012-13	8,988	3,884	5,104	4,719	9,710	9,876
2013-14	8,359	3,500	4,859	4,348	9,777	9,423
2014-15	7,865	3,214	4,651	3,954	9,661	8,949
2015-16	9,100	3,591	5,509	4,448	11,544	10,636
2016-17	9,582	4,036	5,546	5,047	12,696	11,317
2017-18	11,121	4,829	6,292	5,948	14,489	13,134
2018-19	10,779	4,878	5,901	5,932	13,219	12,908
2019-20	9,701	4,397	5,298	5,436	12,317	12,894

=== Traffic accidents by province ===
Punjab had the most and Balochistan had the least ratio of traffic accidents from 2000 to 2010, as compared to other provinces of Pakistan.

==== Islamabad Capital Territory ====
Year	Total number of accidents	Accident		Persons		Total number of vehicles involved
Year	Total number of accidents	Fatal	Non-fatal	Killed	Injured	Total number of vehicles involved
2012-13	201	107	94	109	180	212
2013-14	256	120	136	132	206	256
2014-15	216	107	109	118	182	217
2015-16	244	120	124	140	209	244

==== Sindh ====
Year	Total number of accidents	Accident		Persons		Total number of vehicles involved
Year	Total number of accidents	Fatal	Non-fatal	Killed	Injured	Total number of vehicles involved
2006-07	1618	932	686	1089	1303	1758
2007-08	1561	898	663	1066	1135	1722
2008-09	1433	824	609	961	1160	1562
2009-10	1465	883	582	1031	1261	1580
2010-11	1270	758	512	927	1071	1541
2011-12	1054	681	373	756	681	1121
2012-13	935	582	353	696	637	960
2013-14	945	613	332	791	893	1103
2014-15	881	583	291	771	863	1029
2015-16	924	634	290	749	754	1144

==== Punjab ====
Year	Total number of accidents	Accident		Persons		Total number of vehicles involved
Year	Total number of accidents	Fatal	Non-fatal	Killed	Injured	Total number of vehicles involved
2006-07	5355	2591	2764	3096	6311	5355
2007-08	5522	2721	2801	3293	6163	5522
2008-09	5240	2471	2801	3293	6163	5522
2009-10	5344	2590	2754	3083	5856	5344
2010-11	5420	2591	2829	3167	5809	5420
2011-12	4990	2361	2629	2888	5071	4990
2012-13	4587	2213	2374	2692	4515	4587
2013-14	3696	1717	1979	2145	3941	3696
2014-15	3054	1435	1619	1750	3652	3054
2015-16	3288	1576	1712	2053	4550	3288

==== KPK ====
Year	Total number of accidents	Accident		Persons		Total number of vehicles involved
Year	Total number of accidents	Fatal	Non-fatal	Killed	Injured	Total number of vehicles involved
2006-07	2942	779	2163	1006	4421	3756
2007-08	2893	755	2138	942	3884	3634
2008-09	2392	644	1748	786	3340	2975
2009-10	2559	712	1847	921	3560	3128
2010-11	2722	773	1949	986	4153	3479
2011-12	2772	785	1987	953	3913	2501
2012-13	2986	846	2122	1059	4016	3736
2013-14	3120	877	2243	1033	4257	3934
2014-15	3399	942	2457	1137	4524	4260
2015-16	4287	1083	3204	1299	5527	5490

==== Balochistan ====
Year	Total number of accidents	Accident		Persons		Total number of vehicles involved
Year	Total number of accidents	Fatal	Non-fatal	Killed	Injured	Total number of vehicles involved
2006-07	551	233	318	284	840	612
2007-08	490	236	254	314	914	278
2008-09	431	206	225	248	747	545
2009-10	379	193	186	245	496	444
2010-11	311	158	153	191	350	382
2011-12	324	139	185	161	480	374
2012-13	297	136	161	163	362	381
2013-14	342	173	169	247	480	434
2014-15	315	147	168	178	440	389
2015-16	357	178	179	207	504	470

Most common vehicles involved in road accidents in Pakistan
1. Motorbikes (87.5%)
2. Rickshaws (6.80%)
3. Cars (2.40%)
4. Trucks (1.60%)
5. Other (1.60%)

== Economic cost ==
A study by the Asian Development Bank (ADB) estimated that road accidents in Pakistan resulted in $5.4 billion in losses in 2015 alone. According to a 2018 report of Ministry of Communications, Pakistan incurs an annual loss of approximately $9 billion due to road traffic accidents.

== Contributing factors ==
The primary causes of these accidents are irresponsible road behaviours, such as jaywalking, speeding, running red lights, and driving on wet roads. Poor road condition also contribute significantly, leading to moderate to severe injuries. Many roads in Pakistan are poorly maintained, with potholes, cracks, and inadequate lighting, making nighttime driving especially hazardous.

== Road safety measures ==
=== National Road Safety Strategy (2018–2030) ===
The Ministry of Communication, in collaboration with ADB and the UK Department for International Development, launched "The Pakistan National Road Safety Strategy (2018–2030)." This strategy builds on the foundation of the first National Road Safety Plan for Motorways and National Highways (2017–2018) and expands its focus to cover all road networks and user groups across Pakistan. It sets key priorities for initiatives aimed at saving over 6,000 lives by 2030. To ensure effective implementation, a series of action plans aligned with the government's planning cycle will be developed, beginning with the National Road Safety Action Plan (2020–2024). Each plan will address current road safety trends, emerging issues, and priorities, outlining detailed actions to be taken.

==== National Road Safety Action Plan (2020–2024) ====
The Action Plan is one of two national initiatives designed to support Pakistan's National Road Safety Strategy (2018–2030). Developed in collaboration with ADB and key federal and provincial government agencies responsible for transport, road safety, traffic enforcement, and post-crash response, the plan aims to address critical road safety issues. It received support and endorsement from the National Steering Committee for Road Safety Actions during its 4th meeting, held on 26 February 2020.

== See also ==
- Roads in Pakistan
