= Kotlai =

- City
- Location in Khyber Pakhtunkhwa Location in Pakistan
- Coordinates: 34.79°N 72.24°E
- Country music: Pakistan
- Province: Khyber-Pakhtunkhwa
- District: Swat
- Elevation: 1,089 m (3,573 ft)

Population (2017)
  - Total: 20,631
- Time zone: UTC+5 (PST)

Kotlai is a small town in the Swat District of Pakistan, roughly 130 miles (130 mi) from Islamabad.

It sits at an altitude of 1,089 metres (3,573 ft). It is approximately 4 kilometres (2 mi) east of Kabal, and roughly 16 kilometres (10 mi) from the town of Mingora.

A small highway leads to Kotlai from Shamozai's main road at Akhun Kalai. The village is surrounded on three sides by the Hindu Kush mountains. It is surrounded by the villages of Melaga, Zora, Dero, and Akhun Kalai. Small villages in and around Kotlai include Kargal, Nwartangai, Tarkashai, Dherai, Shago, Warsak, Chenar Tangai, Paindasha, and Sorazghai. The Mashghulgai river runs through Kotlai.

The town has a high school and a small hospital. Most of its inhabitants work in agriculture and gardening. The Learning Village School Kotlai is a private school in Kotlai village.
