= Niaz Amir Muqam =

Member of the Senate of Pakistan from Khyber Pakhtunkhwa province

- نیاز امیر مقام

Member of Senate of Pakistan
- Incumbent
- Assumed office 27 July 2025
- Constituency: Khyber Pakhtunkhwa

Personal details
- Party: PMLN (2025-present)
- Relations: Ibadullah Khan (uncle)
- Parent: Amir Muqam (father)

Niaz Amir Muqam (Urdu: نیاز امیر مقام), also known as Niaz Ahmad Khan, is a Pakistani politician who is a senator for the Senate of Pakistan from the Khyber Pakhtunkhwa province.

== Political career ==
On 21 July 2025, Niaz was elected as a senator from the Khyber Pakhtunkhwa province on a general seat as a Pakistan Muslim League (N) candidate.
