= Muhammad Nawaz Khan Allai =

Pakistani politician

Muhammad Nawaz Allai

Member of the National Assembly of Pakistan
- Incumbent
- Assumed office 29 February 2024
- Constituency: NA-13 Battagram
- In office 13 August 2018 – 10 August 2023
- Constituency: NA-12 (Battagram)
- In office 2008–2013
- Constituency: NA-22 (Battagram)

Personal details
- Party: PTI (2018-present)
- Other political affiliations: PML(Q) (2008-2013)

Muhammad Nawaz Khan Swati is a current royal Chief of Allai, Pakistani politician and current member of the National Assembly of Pakistan, since 2024 representing NA-13 Battagram. Previously he was a member of the National Assembly from 2008 to 2013 and 2018 to 2023. He is the son of famous Nawab of Allai State, Ayub Khan Allai from Swati tribe. Prince reelected in 2024 election as pti candidate from NA 13 Battagram and defeated Qari Muhammad Yousaf of JUI.

== Political career ==
He won his first election in 1997 Pakistani General Elections and was elected to National Assembly of Pakistan from Constituency Mansehra III which is now Battagram.

He ran for the seat of the National Assembly of Pakistan from Constituency NA-22 (Battagram) as a candidate of Pakistan Muslim League (Q) (PML-Q) in the 2002 Pakistani general election but was unsuccessful. He received 10,875 votes and lost the seat to Qari Muhammad Yousuf.

He was elected to the National Assembly from Constituency NA-22 (Battagram) as a candidate of PML-Q in the 2008 Pakistani general election. He received 22,316 votes and defeated Qari Muhammad Yousuf.

He ran for the seat of the National Assembly from Constituency NA-22 (Battagram) as an independent candidate in the 2013 Pakistani general election but was unsuccessful. He received 53 votes and lost the seat to Qari Muhammad Yousuf.

He was re-elected to the National Assembly as a candidate of Pakistan Tehreek-e-Insaf (PTI) from Constituency NA-12 (Battagram) in the 2018 Pakistani general election. He received 34,270 votes and defeated Qari Muhammad Yousuf. Prince again elected in 2024 general election as PTI candidate from NA 13 Battagram and received 32,000 votes and defeated Qari Yousaf of JUI.
