= Malak Said Ahmad Khan =

Pakistani politician (died 2025)

Member of the National Assembly of Pakistan
- In office 1993–1996
- Constituency: NA-12 Kohistan-cum-Lower Kohistan-cum-Kolai Pallas Kohistan (formerly NA-17)

Member of the Provincial Assembly of Khyber Pakhtunkhwa
- In office 1977 – 1977 (assembly dissolved following Martial Law)
- Constituency: PF‑52 (Kohistan)

Personal details
- Born: Dubair, Kohistan District, Pakistan, Khyber Pakhtunkhwa, Pakistan
- Died: 2 March 2025 (1 Ramadan 2025) Kohistan District, Pakistan, Pakistan
- Party: Pakistan Muslim League (N)
- Other political affiliations: Pakistan Peoples Party (former)

Malak Said Ahmad Khan was a Pakistani politician and tribal elder who served as a Member of the National Assembly of Pakistan (1993–1996) and a Member of the Provincial Assembly of Khyber Pakhtunkhwa (1977). He represented constituencies in Kohistan District, Pakistan and participated in regional political and community activities.

== Early life ==
Khan was born in Dubair, Kohistan. His father, Maulana Malak Zafar, had connections with the governance of Wali of Swat and was involved in local leadership.

== Political career ==
He began his political career with the Pakistan Peoples Party (PPP) and later joined Pakistan Muslim League (N) (PML-N) in 2013.

He was elected as a Member of the Provincial Assembly from constituency PF‑52 (Kohistan) in the 1977 provincial elections, but his term ended the same year when the assembly was dissolved following the imposition of Martial Law by General Muhammad Zia-ul-Haq.

He was elected as a Member of the National Assembly of Pakistan from NA-17 (now NA-12) Kohistan constituency in the 1993 general elections.

=== Departure from PPP ===
After the assassination of Benazir Bhutto, he did not support Asif Ali Zardari for the presidency and subsequently left the PPP to join Pakistan Muslim League (N).

== Community and peace initiatives ==
He was involved in local peacekeeping and community activities in Kohistan, including:

- Participating in Jirgas regarding local disputes and community rights.
- Supporting the protection of community forests and meadows.
- According to local reports, he organized a Long March to raise awareness about the management and protection of community-controlled forests.

== Death ==
Khan died on 2 March 2025 (1 Ramadan 2025) in Kohistan.

== See also ==
- Kohistan District, Pakistan
- Pakistan Muslim League (N)
- Pakistan Peoples Party
- NA-12 Kohistan-cum-Lower Kohistan-cum-Kolai Pallas Kohistan
