= NA-2 Swat-I =

Constituency of the National Assembly of Pakistan

NA-2 Swat-I این-۲ سوات-۱
- Constituency for the National Assembly of Pakistan
- District: Bahrain Tehsil, Khwazakhela Tehsil, Charbagh Tehsil and Babuzai Tehsil (partly) of Swat District
- Province: Khyber Pakhtunkhwa
- Electorate: 485,400

Current constituency
- Party: Pakistan Tehreek-e-Insaf
- Member: Amjad Ali Khan
- Created from: NA-30 (Swat-II)

NA-2 Swat-I (این اے-۲ سوات-۱) is a constituency for the National Assembly of Pakistan. The constituency was known as NA-30 (Swat-II) from 2002 to 2018, the name was changed to NA-2 (Swat-I) after the delimitation in 2018 and tehsil Matta was carved out of it to create NA-4 (Swat-III); it was merged with tehsil Kabal to form the constituency.

== Members of Parliament ==
=== 1977–2002: NA-30 (Swat-II) ===
Election	Member	Party
1970	Mian Gul Aurangzaib	Pakistan Muslim League
1977	Mian Gul Aurangzaib	Pakistan Peoples Party
1985	Miangul Aurangzeb	Independent
1988	Shahzada Amani Room	Pakistan Peoples Party
1990	Khaliq Dad Khan	Pakistan Muslim League
1993	Dr. Mehboob ur Rahman	Pakistan People Party
1997	Mian Gul Aurungzaib	Pakistan Muslim League

=== 2002–2018: NA-30 (Swat-II) ===
Election	Member	Party
2002	Fazal-e-Subhan	MMA
2008	Syed Allauddin	PPP
2013	Salim Rehman	PTI

=== 2018–2023: NA-2 (Swat-I) ===
Election	Member	Party
2018	Haider Ali Khan	PTI

=== 2024–present: NA-2 Swat-I ===
Election	Member	Party
2024	Amjad Ali Khan	PTI

== Election 2002 ==
General Elections were held on 10 October 2002. Fazal-e-Subhan won this seat with 67,085 votes.

General Election 2002: NA-30 (Swat-II)
Party	Candidate	Votes	%
MMA	Fazal-e-Subhan	67,085	67.65
PML(Q)	Shujaat Ali Khan	15,680	15.81
PPP	Salim Rehman	10,867	10.96
PAP	Shaukat Ali	2,592	2.61
PMAP	Muhammad Mukhtar	2,134	2.15
PTI	Liaqat Ali Khan	811	0.82
Valid ballots		99,169	96.94
Rejected ballots		3,134	3.06
Turnout		102,303	32.41
Majority		51,405	51.84
MMA gain from PML(N)			

== Election 2008 ==
General Elections were held on 18 February 2008. Syed Allaudinn won this seat with 24,063 votes.

General Election 2008: NA-30 (Swat-II)
Party	Candidate	Votes	%
PPP	Syed Allauddin	24,063	34.72
PML(Q)	Shujaat Ali Khan	16,337	23.57
Independent	Sher Bahader	7,894	11.39
MMA	Mohammad Hafiz-ur-Rehman	7,363	10.62
ANP	Mohammad Ayub Khan	3,804	5.49
PML(N)	Mohammad Riyaz	3,014	4.35
Independent	Mufti Hussain Ahmad	1,639	2.36
Independent	Moulana Altafullah	1,031	1.49
Independent	Shakirullah	490	0.71
Valid ballots		69,314	95.96
Rejected ballots		2,918	4.04
Turnout		72,232	17.86
Majority		7,726	11.15
PPP gain from MMA			

== Election 2013 ==
General Elections were held on 11 May 2013. Salim Rehman from Pakistan Tehreek-e-Insaf won this seat with 49,976 votes.

General Election 2013: NA-30 (Swat-II)
Party	Candidate	Votes	%
PTI	Salim Rehman	49,976	31.49
PML(N)	Amir Muqam	33,027	20.81
JUI (F)	Muhammad Hafiz-ur-Rahman	16,704	10.52
PPP	Syed Allauddin	16,373	10.32
ANP	Khurshid	15,595	9.83
JI	Fazal-e-Subhan	11,367	7.16
Valid ballots		158,717	95.64
Rejected ballots		7,228	4.36
Turnout		165,945	35.88
Majority		16,949	10.68
PTI gain from PPP			

== Election 2018 ==
General elections were held on 25 July 2018. Pakistan Tehreek-e-Insaf's candidate Haider Ali Khan win the election from NA-2 Swat by securing 61,687 votes while Amir Muqam from Pakistan Muslim League (N) obtained 41,125 votes.

General election 2018: NA-2 (Swat-I)
Party	Candidate	Votes	%	±%
PTI	Haider Ali Khan	61,687	37.21	▲5.72
PML(N)	Amir Muqam	41,125	24.81	▲4.00
MMA	Naveed Iqbal	18,055	10.89	▼24.47^{†}
PPP	Amjad Ali Khan	16,018	9.66	▼0.66
ANP	Mumtaz Ahmed Chamoot	14,618	8.82	▼1.01
Others	Others (five candidates)	5,557	3.35	
Turnout		165,781	43.29	▲7.41
Rejected ballots		8,721	5.26	
Majority		20,562	12.40	
Registered electors		382,974		
PTI hold		Swing	▲0.86	

^{†}JI and JUI-F contested as part of MMA

== Election 2024 ==
In the 2024 Pakistani general election, PTI backed independent Amjad Ali Khan won the election by 51,174 votes by bagging 88,938 votes while his closest competitor, Amir Muqam could only get 37,764 votes.

General election 2024: NA-2 Swat-I
Party	Candidate	Votes	%	±%
PTI	Amjad Ali Khan (Note: Filed nomination papers as PTI candidate but ECP allowed him to run as an Independent)	88,938	52.22	▲15.01
PML(N)	Amir Muqam	37,764	22.17	▼2.64
JUI (F)	Abdul Ghafoor	15,522	9.11	N/A
PPP	Haider Ali Khan	11,632	6.83	▼2.83
ANP	Muhammad Ayub Khan	9,158	5.38	▼3.44
Others	Others (four candidates)	8,336	4.89	
Turnout		170,360	35.11	▼8.18
Rejected ballots		6,006	3.50	
Majority		51,174	30.03	▲17.63
Registered electors		485,400		

== See also ==
- NA-1 Upper Chitral-cum-Lower Chitral
- NA-3 Swat-II
