= Malik Muhammad Idrees =

Member of the National Assembly of Pakistan from Kohistan (2024–2029)

- ملک محمد ادریس

Member of the National Assembly of Pakistan
- Incumbent
- Assumed office 29 February 2024
- Constituency: NA-12 Kohistan-cum-Lower Kohistan-cum-Kolai Palas Kohistan

Personal details
- Party: PMLN (2024-present)
- Other political affiliations: PTI (2021-2024)

Malik Muhammad Idrees (Urdu: ملک محمد ادریس), is a Pakistani politician who has a member of the National Assembly of Pakistan since February 2024 from Constituency NA-12 Kohistan-cum-Lower Kohistan-cum-Kolai Palas Kohistan.

== Political career ==
He was elected to the position of Tehsil Nazim of Dassu Tehsil in the 2021–22 Khyber Pakhtunkhwa local elections as a candidate of the Pakistan Tehreek-e-Insaf (PTI). He received 4,427 votes and defeated Barkat Ullah, ran as qn independent candidate.

Idrees won the 2024 Pakistani general election from NA-12 Kohistan-cum-Lower Kohistan-cum-Kolai Palas Kohistan as an Independent candidate, endorsed by Pakistan Tehreek-e-Insaf (PTI), due to party symbol being stolen. He received 26,583 votes while runners up Salahuddin of Jamiat Ulema-e-Islam (F) received 22,043 votes.
