= NA-4 Swat-III =

National Assembly constituency in Swat District, Khyber Pakhtunkhwa, Pakistan

- Constituency for the National Assembly of Pakistan
- Region: Matta Tehsil and Kabal Tehsil (partly) of Swat District
- Electorate: 529,791

Current constituency
- Created: 2018
- Party: Pakistan Tehreek-e-Insaf
- Member: Sohail Sultan
- Created from: NA-29 (Swat-I) and NA-30 (Swat-II)

NA-4 Swat-III (این اے-4، سوات-III) is a constituency of the National Assembly of Pakistan, located in Swat District, Khyber Pakhtunkhwa. Created through the 2018 delimitation, it comprises Matta Tehsil and part of Kabal Tehsil. Prior to 2018, Kabal was part of NA-29 (Swat-I), now designated NA-3 Swat-II, and Matta was part of NA-30 (Swat-II), now designated NA-2 Swat-I. At the 2024 general election the registered electorate stood at 529,791.

== Members of Parliament ==
=== 2018 to present: NA-4 Swat-III ===
Election	Member	Party
2018	Murad Saeed	PTI
2024	Sohail Sultan	PTI (Note: Filed nomination papers as a PTI candidate but was required by the Election Commission of Pakistan to contest as an independent candidate.)

== 2018 general election ==
General elections were held on 25 July 2018. Murad Saeed of PTI won the seat with 71,600 votes.

General election 2018: NA-4 Swat-III
Party	Candidate	Votes	%	±%
PTI	Murad Saeed	71,600	44.63	
ANP	Saleem Khan	30,975	19.31	
MMA	Qari Mehmood	17,542	10.93	
PML(N)	Feroze Shah	14,494	9.03	
PPP	Qamar Zaman Khan	12,328	7.68	
Others	Others (six candidates)	6,970	4.34	
Turnout		160,431	39.22	
Rejected ballots		6,522	4.08	
Majority		40,625	25.32	
Registered electors		409,012		
PTI hold		Swing	N/A	

== 2024 general election ==
General elections were held on 8 February 2024. Sohail Sultan won the seat with 88,085 votes.

General election 2024: NA-4 Swat-III
Party	Candidate	Votes	%	±%
PTI	Sohail Sultan	88,085	56.20	▲11.57
ANP	Saleem Khan	20,997	13.40	▼5.91
PTI-P	Mahmood Khan	17,468	11.15	N/A
JUI (F)	Rahim Ullah	15,394	9.82	N/A
Others	Others (sixteen candidates)	14,782	9.43	
Turnout		162,213	30.62	▼8.60
Rejected ballots		5,487	3.38	
Majority		67,088	42.81	▲17.49
Registered electors		529,791		

== See also ==
- NA-3 Swat-II
- NA-5 Upper Dir
