= Sohail Sultan =

Pakistani politician

- سہیل سُلطان

Member of the National Assembly of Pakistan
- Incumbent
- Assumed office 29 February 2024
- Constituency: NA-4 Swat-III

Personal details
- Party: PTI (2024-present)

Sohail Sultan (Urdu: سہیل سُلطان), is a Pakistani politician who is a member of the National Assembly of Pakistan since February 2024.

== Political career ==
Sultan won the 2024 Pakistani general election from NA-4 Swat-III as an Independent candidate. He received 88,009 votes while runners up Muhammad Saleem Khan of Awami National Party received 20,890 votes.
