= NA-3 Swat-II =

Constituency of the National Assembly of Pakistan

- Constituency for the National Assembly of Pakistan
- District: Barikot Tehsil, Babuzai Tehsil (partly), and Kabal Tehsil (partly) of Swat District
- Electorate: 482,681

Current constituency
- Party: Pakistan Tehreek-e-Insaf
- Member: Salim Rehman
- Created from: NA-29 (Swat-I)

NA-3 Swat-II (این اے-3، سوات-II) is a constituency for the National Assembly of Pakistan. The constituency was known as NA-29 (Swat-I) from 1977 to 2018, the name was changed to NA-3 (Swat-II) after the delimitation in 2018 and tehsil Kabal was carved out of it to create NA-4 (Swat-III) where it joined tehsil Matta to make up that constituency.

== Members of Parliament ==
=== 1977–2002: NA-29 (Swat-I) ===
Election	Member	Party
1977	Shamsul Haq	Independent
1985	Malik Haji Khial Shah	Independent
1988	Hafiz Fazal Razik	Pakistan Muslim League
1990	Abdul Matin Khan	Independent
1993	Al-Haj M. Afzal	PKQP
1997	Syed Munir Sayed	Pakistan Muslim League

=== 2002–2018: NA-29 (Swat-I) ===
Election	Member	Party
2002	Qari Abdul Baees Saddiqui	MMA
2008	Muzafer-ul-Mulk	ANP
2013	Murad Saeed	PTI

=== 2018-present: NA-3 Swat-II ===
Election	Member	Party
2018	Salim Rehman	PTI
2024	Salim Rehman	PTI

== Election 2002 ==
General Elections were held on 10 October 2002. Qari Abdul Baees Siddiqui won this seat with 65,808 votes.

General Election 2002: NA-29 (Swat-I)
Party	Candidate	Votes	%
MMA	Qari Abdul Baees Siddiqui	65,808	67.16
PML(Q)	Adnan Aurang Zeb	18,265	18.64
PTI	Imran Khan	6,060	6.19
PPP	Shamsher Ali Khan	5,921	6.04
NA	Azeem Khan Advocate	1,932	1.97
Valid ballots		97,986	97.55
Rejected ballots		2,465	2.45
Turnout		100,451	31.94
Majority		47,543	48.52
MMA gain from Independent			

== Election 2008 ==
General Elections were held on 18 February 2008. Muzafer ul Mulk won this seat with 19,860 votes.

General Election 2008: NA-29 (Swat-I)
Party	Candidate	Votes	%
ANP	Muzafer-ul-Mulk	19,860	31.22
Independent	Mian Gul Adnan Aurangzeb	17,253	27.12
PPP	Salim Rehman	12,774	20.08
MMA	Maulana Sadiq Ahmad	8,592	13.51
PML(N)	Riaz Ahmad Khan	4,575	7.19
MQM	Maryam Bibi	345	0.54
Independent	Rizwana Latif	212	0.34
Valid ballots		63,611	96.85
Rejected ballots		2,066	3.15
Turnout		65,677	18.13
Majority		2,607	4.10
ANP gain from MMA			

== Election 2013 ==
General Elections were held on 11 May 2013. Murad Saeed won this seat with 88,513 votes.

General Election 2013: NA-29 (Swat-I)
Party	Candidate	Votes	%
PTI	Murad Saeed	88,513	49.49
PML(N)	Syed Muhammad Ali Shah Bacha Lala	24,212	13.54
JUI (F)	Maulana Nizam ud Din	21,026	11.76
ANP	Muzafer-ul-Mulk	14,690	8.21
JI	Akhtar Ali Khan	11,240	6.28
PPP	Dost Muhammad Khan	7,919	4.43
Valid ballots		178,857	96.63
Rejected ballots		6,237	3.07
Turnout		185,094	35.37
Majority		64,301	35.95
PTI gain from ANP			

== Election 2018 ==
General elections were held on 25 July 2018.

Contest overview

Pakistan Tehreek-e-Insaf's candidate Salim Rehman had been elected member of National Assembly previously from NA-30 (Swat-II) (now NA-2 (Swat-I)) and he was up against former Chief Minister (CM) of Punjab Shehbaz Sharif who is also the president of Pakistan Muslim League (N) and has been CM Punjab thrice. Muttahida Majlis-e-Amal initially considered Hujjatullah as its candidate but decided not to field him in support of Sharif. Disagreeing with that, Hujjatullah decided to run independently. Rehman also ran in the 2002 election as a Pakistan Peoples Party Parliamentarians candidate from NA-30 (Swat-II) and then in 2008 from this very constituency which was then NA-29 (Swat-I), losing both times.

Results

General election 2018: NA-3 (Swat-II)
Party	Candidate	Votes	%	±%
PTI	Salim Rehman	68,162	42.11	▼7.38
PML(N)	Shehbaz Sharif	22,756	14.06	▲0.52
PPP	Shaharyar Ameer Zeb	22,046	13.62	▲9.19
ANP	Abdul Kareem Khan	21,895	13.53	▲5.32
Independent	Hujjatullah	16,747	10.35	▲10.35
Others	Others (three candidates)	3,814	2.35	
Turnout		161,872	40.35	▲4.98
Rejected ballots		6,452	3.98	
Majority		45,406	28.05	
Registered electors		401,124		
PTI hold		Swing	▼3.95	

== Election 2024 ==
General elections were held on 8 February 2024. Salim Rehman won the election with 81,490 votes.

General election 2024: NA-3 Swat-II
Party	Candidate	Votes	%	±%
PTI	Salim Rehman (Note: Filed nomination papers as PTI candidate but ECP allowed him to run as an Independent)	81,490	50.15	▲8.04
PML(N)	Wajid Ali Khan	27,941	17.19	▲3.13
ANP	Sher Baz Khan	16,767	10.32	▼3.21
JUI (F)	Kaisar Khan	11,615	7.15	N/A
JI	Akhtar Ali Khan	9,455	5.82	N/A
PPP	Shahryar Amirzeb	9,391	5.78	▼7.84
PTI-P	Usman Ghani	4,182	2.57	N/A
Independent	Shaukat Ali	1,658	1.02	N/A
Turnout		167,474	36.20	▼4.15
Rejected ballots		4,975	2.97	
Majority		53,549	32.95	▲4.90
Registered electors		462,681		

== See also ==
- NA-2 Swat-I
- NA-4 Swat-III
