= Najmuddin Khan =

Pakistani politician

Najmuddin Khan MNA

Member of the National Assembly of Pakistan
- In office 2008–2013
- Constituency: NA-33 Upper Dir-cum-Lower Dir
- In office 1990–1993
- Constituency: NA-25 Dir
- In office October 1999 – February 1997
- Constituency: PF-73 Dir-I

Personal details
- Party: PPP (2025-present) office2 = Member of the Provincial Assembly of the North-West Frontier Province
- Other political affiliations: PPP (1997-2025)

Najmuddin Khan is a Pakistani politician who had been a member of the National Assembly of Pakistan from 2008 to 2013 and previously from 1990-1993 He was also a member of the Provincial Assembly of the North-West Frontier Province from February 1997 to October 1999.

== Political career ==
He was elected to the National Assembly of Pakistan as a candidate of the Pakistan Democratic Alliance (PDA) from NA-25 Dir constituency in the 1990 Pakistani general election. He received 28,533 votes and defeated Sahibzada Fathullah, a candidate of the Pakistan Islamic Front (PIF)

He was elected to the Provincial Assembly of the North-West Frontier Province provincial election as a candidate of the Pakistan People's Party (PPP) from PF-73 Dir-I in the 1997 North-West Frontier Province provincial election. He received 6,727 votes and defeated Inamullah Khan, a candidate of the Pakistan Muslim League (N) (PML(N)).

He was re-elected to the National Assembly from NA-33 (Upper Dir) as a candidate of PPP in the 2008 Pakistani general election. He received 27,594 votes and defeated Sahibzada Sibghatullah, an independent candidate.

He ran for the seat of the National Assembly from NA-33 (Upper Dir) as a candidate of PPP in the 2013 Pakistani general election but was unsuccessful. He revived 26,487 votes and was defeated by Sahabzada Tariq Ullah, a candidate of Jamaat-e-Islami (JI).

He ran for the seat of the National Assembly as a candidate of PPP from Constituency NA-5 (Upper Dir) in the 2018 Pakistani general election but was unsuccessful. He received 53,967 votes and lost the seat to Sahibzada Sibghatullah, a candidate of the Pakistan Tehreek-e-Insaf (PTI).
