= NA-12 Kohistan-cum-Lower Kohistan-cum-Kolai Pallas Kohistan =

Constituency of the National Assembly of Pakistan

NA-12 Kohistan-cum-Lower Kohistan-cum-Kolai Palas Kohistan
- Constituency for the National Assembly of Pakistan
- Region: Upper Kohistan District; Lower Kohistan District; Kolai-Palas District
- Electorate: 196,125

Current constituency
- Party: PML(N)
- Member: Malik Muhammad Idrees
- Created from: NA-11 (Kohistan)

NA-12 Upper Kohistan-cum-Lower Kohistan-cum-Kolai Palas Kohistan (-این اے-12،اپر کوہستان-کم-لوئر کوہستان-کم-کولائی پالاس) is a constituency for the National Assembly of Pakistan. It covers the whole of districts of Kohistan, Lower Kohistan, and Kolai-Palas. The constituency was formerly known as NA-23 (Kohistan) from 1977 to 2018. The name changed to NA-11 (Kohistan) after the delimitation in 2018 and to NA-12 (Kohistan-cum-Lower Kohistan-cum-Kolai Palas Kohistan) after the delimitation in 2022.

== Members of Parliament ==
=== 1977–2002: NA-23 Kohistan ===
Election	Member	Party
1977	Fateh M. Khan	PPP
1985	Fateh M. Khan	Independent
1988	Dr Mahboob-ur-Rehman	PPP
1990	M. Afzal Khan	IJI
1993	Malak Said Ahmad Khan	PPP
1997	Malak Aurangzeb	Independent

=== 2002–2018: NA-23 Kohistan ===
Election	Member	Party
2002	Molvi Abdul Haleem	MMA
2008	Mehboobullah	Independent
2013	Sarzameen	Independent

=== 2018–2023: NA-11 Kohistan-cum-Lower Kohistan-cum-Kolai Palas Kohistan ===
Election	Member	Party
2018	Afreen Khan	MMA

=== 2024–present: NA-12 Kohistan-cum-Lower Kohistan-cum-Kolai Palas Kohistan ===
Election	Member	Party
2024	Malik Muhammad Idrees	PML(N)

== Elections since 2002 ==
=== 2002 general election ===
2002 General Election: NA-23 (Kohistan)
Party	Candidate	Votes	%	±%
MMA	Abdul Halim Khan	15,603	39.41	
PML-Q	Mehboob Ullah Jan	10,630	26.85	
Independent	Abbas Sarfaraz Khan	7,915	19.99	
Independent	Muhammad Aslam	3,143	7.94	
Independent	Saif-ur-Rehman	1,696	4.28	
PPPP	Afzal Khan	436	1.10	
Independent	Muhammad Anwar	169	0.43	
Majority		4,973	12.56	
Turnout		39,592	16.14	
MMA gain from ANP				

A total of 1,012 votes were rejected.

=== 2008 general election ===
2008 General Election: NA-23 (Kohistan)
Party	Candidate	Votes	%	±%
Independent	Mehboob Ullah Jan	14,100	26.56	
PPPP	Haji Misar Khan	13,412	25.26	+24.16
PML	Saranzaib Khan	9,625	18.13	
PML-N	Jehanzeb Khan	6,439	12.13	
MMA	Molvi Karimdad	5,418	10.21	−29.20
Independent	Abdur Rehman	3,960	7.46	
Independent	Didar Khan	78	0.15	
Independent	Abdul Sattar Khan	54	0.10	
Majority		688	1.30	
Turnout		53,086	16.70	+0.56
Independent gain from MMA				

A total of 3,386 votes were rejected.

=== 2013 general election ===
2013 General Election: NA-23 (Kohistan)
Party	Candidate	Votes	%	±%
Independent	Sar Zamin Khan	17,498	33.93	
JUI-F	Mehboob Ullah Jan	12,337	23.93	
PML-N	Malak Said Ahmad Khan	11,865	23.01	+10.88
PML	Alhaaj Malak Aurangzeb Khan	4,997	9.69	−8.44
Independent	Malak Abad Shah	3,882	7.53	
MDM	Abdul Ghafoor	530	1.03	
Independent	Dilawar Khan	254	0.49	
Independent	Ameez Khan	202	0.39	
Majority		5,161	10.00	
Turnout		51,565	40.24	+23.54
Independent gain from Independent				

A total of 1,022 votes were rejected.

=== 2018 general election ===
General elections were held on 25 July 2018.

General election 2018: NA-11 (Kohistan-cum-Lower Kohistan-cum-Kolai Palas Kohistan)
Party	Candidate	Votes	%	±%
MMA	Afreen Khan	15,859	25.08	▲0.12^{†}
Independent	Dost Muhammad Shakir	14,148	22.38	▲22.38
PML(Q)	Mehboob Ullah Jan	12,627	19.97	▲10.28
PTI	Malik Haji Aurangzeb	9,584	15.16	▲15.16
Independent	Syed Gul Badshah	4,487	7.10	▲7.10
PPP	Malik Noor Wali Shah	4,185	6.62	▲6.62
Others	Others (eleven candidates)	810	1.27	
Turnout		63,229	40.89	▲0.65
Rejected ballots		1,529	2.42	
Majority		1,711	2.70	
Registered electors		154,620		
MMA gain from Independent				

^{†}Change from combined vote of JUI-F, and MDM in 2013

=== 2024 general election ===
General elections were held on 8 February 2024. Malik Muhammad Idrees won the election with 28,010 votes.

General election 2024: NA-12 Upper Kohistan-cum-Lower Kohistan-cum-Kolai Palas Kohistan
Party	Candidate	Votes	%	±%
PML(N)	Malik Muhammad Idrees	28,010	27.69	N/A
JUI (F)	Malak Salahuddin Khan	23,014	22.75	N/A
PPP	Mehboob Ullah Jan	21,061	20.82	▲14.20
Independent	Molvi Karim Dad	15,493	15.32	N/A
Others	Others (ten candidates)	13,581	13.43	
Turnout		102,812	52.42	▲11.53
Rejected ballots		1,653	1.61	
Majority		4,996	4.94	
Registered electors		196,125		
PML(N) gain from JUI (F)				

== See also ==
- NA-11 Shangla
- NA-13 Battagram
