= NA-5 Upper Dir =

Constituency of the National Assembly of Pakistan

- Constituency for the National Assembly of Pakistan
- Region: Upper Dir District
- Electorate: 590,433

Current constituency
- Party: Pakistan Tehreek-e-Insaf
- Member: Sahibzada Sibghatullah
- Created from: NA-33 (Upper Dir-cum-Lower Dir)

NA-5 Upper Dir (Urdu: این اے-۵، دیر بالا) is a constituency for the National Assembly of Pakistan. It comprises the whole district of Upper Dir. The area was formerly part of NA-33 (Upper Dir-cum-Lower Dir) constituency from 1977 to 2018. That constituency also included parts of the district of Lower Dir. The constituency for Upper Dir was named NA-5 (Upper Dir).

== Members of Parliament ==
=== 1977–1985: NA-26 Dir ===
Election	Member	Party
1977	Sahibzada Saifullah	Pakistan National Alliance

=== 1985–1997: NA-25 Dir ===
Election	Member	Party
1985	Maulana Muhammad Inayat-ur-Rehman	IND
1988	Sahibzada Fathullah	IJI
1990	Najmuddin Khan	PDA
1993	Sahibzada Fathullah	PIF
1997	Inayat Khan	PML(N)

=== 2002–2018: NA-33 (Upper Dir-cum-Lower Dir) ===
Election	Member	Party
2002	Molana Asad Ullah	MMA
2008	Najmuddin Khan	PPP
2013	Sahabzada Tariq Ullah	JI

=== 2018-present: NA-5 (Upper Dir) ===
Election	Member	Party
2018	Sahibzada Sibghatullah	PTI
2024	Sahibzada Sibghatullah	PTI

== Election 2002 ==
General Elections were held on 10 October 2002. Molana Asad Ullah won this seat with 39,362 votes

General Election 2002: NA-33 (Upper Dir-cum-Lower-Dir)
Party	Candidate	Votes	%
MMA	Molana Asad Ullah	39,362	54.72
PPP	Muhammad Anwar Khan Advocate	24,259	33.72
QWP	Barrister Muhammad Islam Khan	4,184	5.82
ANP	Gul Zamin Said	3,268	4.54
PTI	Sultan Ali Shah	861	1.20
Valid ballots		71,934	96.54
Rejected ballots		2,581	3.46
Turnout		74,515	32.26
Majority		15,103	21.00
MMA gain from Independent			

== Election 2008 ==
2008 General Election: NA-33 (Upper Dir-cum-Lower-Dir)
Party	Candidate	Votes	%	±%
PPPP	Najmuddin Khan	27,594	39.47	+5.75
Independent	Sahibzada Sibghatullah	19,910	28.48	
ANP	Naveed Anjum Khan	8,124	11.62	+7.08
PML-N	Mohmmad-ul-Mulk (Akhon Zada)	6,508	9.31	
PML	Farhad Ali Khan	5,606	8.02	
MMA	Molana Fazal Azim	1,572	2.25	−52.47
Independent	Dr Bahramand Khan	395	0.56	
Independent	Maulana Said Jalal	118	0.17	
Independent	Saleem-ur-Rehman Advocate	84	0.12	
Majority		7,684	10.99	
Turnout		69,911	26.75	−5.51
PPPP gain from MMA				

A total of 2,020 votes were rejected.

== Election 2013 ==
2013 General Election: NA-33 (Upper Dir-cum-Lower-Dir)
Party	Candidate	Votes	%	±%
JI	Sahabzada Tariq Ullah	42,582	36.88	
PPPP	Najmuddin Khan	26,803	23.21	−16.26
PML-N	Malak Muhammad Zeb Khan	17,343	15.02	+5.71
PTI	Muhammad Nawaz	15,397	13.33	
JUI-F	Maulana Fazil Azeem	6,567	5.69	
ANP	Naveed Anjum Khan	4,262	3.69	−7.93
PML	Umar Zeb Khan	1,322	1.14	−6.88
Independent	Muhammad Ameer Khan	447	0.39	
APML	Muhammad Zeb	441	0.38	
Tehreek-e-Pasmanada Awam Pakistan	Farooq Ahmad	309	0.27	
Majority		15,779	13.67	
Turnout		115,473	32.14	+5.39
JI gain from PPPP				

A total of 4,360 votes were rejected.

== Election 2018 ==
General elections were held on 25 July 2018.

General election 2018: NA-5 (Upper Dir)
Party	Candidate	Votes	%	±%
PTI	Sahibzada Sibghatullah	66,545	30.81	▲17.48
MMA	Sahabzada Tariq Ullah	57,776	26.75	▼15.82^{†}
PPP	Najmuddin Khan	53,967	24.99	▲1.78
Others	Others (seven candidates)	29,495	13.67	
Turnout		215,920	48.26	▲16.12
Rejected ballots		8,137	3.78	
Majority		8,769	4.06	
Registered electors		447,414		
PTI gain from JI				

^{†}JI and JUI-F contested as part of MMA

== Election 2024 ==
General elections were held on 8 February 2024. Sahibzada Sibghatullah won the election with 91,165 votes.

General election 2024: NA-5 Upper Dir
Party	Candidate	Votes	%	±%
PTI	Sahibzada Sibghatullah (Note: Filed nomination papers as PTI candidate but ECP allowed him to run as an Independent)	91,165	44.28	▲13.47
JI	Sahabzada Tariq Ullah	49,066	23.83	N/A
PPP	Najmuddin Khan	38,027	18.47	▼6.52
Others	Others (eight candidates)	27,631	13.42	
Turnout		214,908	36.40	▼11.86
Rejected ballots		9,019	4.20	
Majority		42,099	20.45	▲16.39
Registered electors		590,433		

== See also ==
- NA-4 Swat-III
- NA-6 Lower Dir-I
