= Sahabzada Tariq Ullah =

Pakistani politician

- صاحبزادہ طارق اللہ

Member of the National Assembly of Pakistan
- In office 1 June 2013 – 31 May 2018
- Constituency: NA-33 (Upper Dir-cum-Lower Dir)

Personal details
- Born: 25 April 1956 (age 69)
- Party: JUI (F) (2025-present)
- Other political affiliations: JIP (2013-2025)
- Relations: Sahibzada Sibghatullah (cousin)

Sahabzada Tariq Ullah (Urdu: صاحبزادہ طارق اللہ; born 25 April 1956) is a Pakistani politician who had been a member of the National Assembly of Pakistan, from June 2013 to May 2018.

== Early life ==
He was born on 25 April 1956.

== Political career ==
He was elected to the Provincial Assembly of the North-West Frontier Province as a candidate of the Pakistan Islamic Front (PIF) from PF-73 Dir-I in the 1993 North-West Frontier Province provincial election. He received 13,617 votes and defeated Haji Aman Ullah Khan, a candidate of the Pakistan Muslim League (N) (PML(N)).

He was elected to the National Assembly of Pakistan as a candidate of Jamaat-e-Islami Pakistan from Constituency NA-33 (Upper Dir-cum-Lower Dir) in the 2013 Pakistani general election. He received 42,582 votes and defeated Najmuddin Khan, a candidate of Pakistan Peoples Party.

He ran for Prime Minister of Pakistan in 2017 against Shahid Khaqan Abbasi, but was unsuccessful he received only 4 vote and lost.

He ran for the National Assembly as a candidate of the Muttahida Majlis-e-Amal (MMA) from NA-5 Upper Dir in the 2018 Pakistani general election, but was unsuccessful. He received 57,776 votes and was defeated by Sahibzada Sibghatullah, a candidate of the Pakistan Tehreek-e-Insaf (PTI).
