= Ibadullah Khan =

Pakistani politician

- عباداللہ خان

Leader of the Opposition in the Provincial Assembly of Khyber Pakhtunkhwa
- Incumbent
- Assumed office 4 March 2024
- Preceded by: Akram Khan Durrani

Member of the Provincial Assembly of Khyber Pakhtunkhwa
- Incumbent
- Assumed office 29 February 2024
- Constituency: PK-30 Shangla-III

Parliamentary Secretary Planning, Development & Special Initiatives
- In office January 2017 – May 2018

Chairman of Standing Committee on Communication
- In office February 2019 – 10 August 2023

Member of National Assembly of Pakistan
- In office Jun 2013 – May 2018
- Constituency: NA-31 (Shangla)
- In office 13 August 2018 – 10 August 2023
- Constituency: NA-10 (Shangla)

District Nazim ناظم اعلیٰ
- In office 2005–2009
- Constituency: Shangla District

Personal details
- Born: 15 November 1974 (age 51) Shangla District, Khyber Pakhtunkhwa, Pakistan
- Party: PMLN (2013-present)
- Relatives: Amir Muqam (brother); Niaz Amir Muqam (nephew)

Ibadullah Khan (Urdu: عباد اللہ خان; born 15 November 1974) is a Pakistani politician who is serving as Opposition leader in the Khyber pakhtunkhwa provincial assembly. He was joint candidate of PML-N, PPP, JUI-F, PTI-P and ANP for Chief Minister of KPK in 2024 election. He had been a member of the National Assembly of Pakistan from August 2013 till August 2018 and again from 2018 to 2023. He was the Parliamentary Secretary for Planning Development and special initiative in Nawaz Sharif Government and he was Chairman of Standing Committee on Communications in National Assembly from April 2019 till August 2023. He has been member of provincial assembly of Khyber Pakhtunkhwa since 29 February 2024.

== Early life ==
He was born on 15 November 1974 in Puran of district Shangla. He did his early schooling in his village and then went to study Bachelor of Dental surgery (BDS) in Khyber Medical University, Peshawar. He is younger brother of Amir Muqam.

== Political career ==
He started his political career after his brother Amir Muqam vacant his UC Nazim seat to contest in General Elections in 2002, thus He became UC Nazim of his village. Then he became district nazim of Shangla in next local government elections in 2005 and served till 2009.

Ibad Ullah was elected to the National Assembly of Pakistan as a candidate of Pakistan Muslim League (N) (PML-N) from Constituency NA-31 (Shangla) after his brother Amir Muqam who was two times MNA from the same constituency, decided to contest from Swat and field him in the 2013 Pakistani general election. He received 30,916 votes and defeated a candidate of Awami National Party (ANP). During his tenure as Member of the National Assembly, he served as the Federal Parliamentary Secretary for Planning and Development.

He was re-elected to the National Assembly as a candidate of PML-N from Constituency NA-10 (Shangla) in the 2018 Pakistani general election. He received 34,070 votes and defeated Sadeed ur Rehman, a candidate of ANP.
