= Haider Ali Khan =

Pakistani politician

Member of the National Assembly of Pakistan
- In office 13 August 2018 – 20 January 2023
- Constituency: NA-2 (Swat-I)

Member of the Provincial Assembly of Khyber Pakhtunkhwa
- In office 8 May 2014 – 28 May 2018
- Constituency: PK-86 (Swat-VII)
- In office 20 March 2008 – 20 March 2013
- Constituency: PF-86 (Swat-VII)

Personal details
- Born: 17 March 1964 (age 62) Swat District, Khyber Pakhtunkhwa, Pakistan
- Party: JUI (F) (2025-present)
- Other political affiliations: PPP (2023-2025); PTI (2018-2023); ANP (2008-2014)

Haider Ali Khan is a Pakistani politician from Pakistan Tehreek-e-Insaf who had been a member of the National Assembly of Pakistan, from August 2018 till January 2023 after winning elections from NA-2 (Swat-I). Previously, he was a Member of the Provincial Assembly of Khyber Pakhtunkhwa from 2008 to 2013 and again from April 2014 to May 2018.

== Early life and education ==
He was born on 17 March 1964 in Swat District, Pakistan. He completed his Intermediate Education (F.Sc.) from Abbottabad Public School. He received the degree of Bachelor of Medicine, and Bachelor of Surgery (MBBS) from Khyber Medical University in 1992.

== Political career ==
Khan was elected to the Provincial Assembly of Khyber Pakhtunkhwa as a candidate of Awami National Party (ANP) from PF-86 (Swat-VII) in the 2008 North-West Frontier Province provincial election. He received 8,064 votes and defeated Qaimos Khan, a candidate of Pakistan Muslim League (Q) (PML-Q).

He ran for the seat of the Provincial Assembly of Khyber Pakhtunkhwa as a candidate of ANP from PK-86 (Swat-VII) in the 2013 Khyber Pakhtunkhwa provincial election but was unsuccessful. He received 10,028 votes and lost the seat to Qaimos Khan, a candidate of Pakistan Muslim League (N) (PML-N).

In February 2014, he quit ANP and joined the Pakistan Tehreek-e-Insaf (PTI).

He was re-elected to the Provincial Assembly of Khyber Pakhtunkhwa as a candidate of the PTI from PK-86 (Swat-VII) in an April 2014 by-election. He received 17,420 votes and defeated Sardar Khan, a candidate of PML-N.

He was elected to the National Assembly of Pakistan as a candidate of the PTI from NA-2 (Swat-I) in the 2018 Pakistani general election.

After the May 9th protests, Khan quit PTI and joined the Pakistan People's Party.

== Electoral history ==
=== 2018 ===
General election 2018: NA-2 (Swat-I)
Party	Candidate	Votes	%
PTI	Haider Ali Khan	61,687	37.21
PML(N)	Amir Muqam	41,125	24.81
MMA	Naveed Iqbal	18,055	10.89
PPP	Amjad Ali Khan	16,018	9.66
ANP	Mumtaz Ahmed Chamoot	14,618	8.82
Others	Others (five candidates)	5,557	3.35
