= NA-13 Battagram =

Constituency of the National Assembly of Pakistan

- Constituency for the National Assembly of Pakistan
- Region: Battagram District
- Electorate: 328,902

Current constituency
- Party: Sunni Ittehad Council
- Member: Muhammad Nawaz Khan Allai
- Created from: NA-17 (Mansehra Kohistan) 1977-1988 NA-16 (Mansehra III) 1988-2002; NA-22 (Battagram) 2002-2018 NA-12 (Battagram) 2018-2023
- Replaced by: NA-13 (Battagram) 2023 onwards

NA-13 Battagram (این اے-13، بٹگرام) is a constituency for the National Assembly of Pakistan. It covers the whole of district Battagram. The constituency was formerly known as NA-22 (Battagram) from 1977 to 2018. The name changed to NA-12 (Battagram) after the delimitation in 2018 and to NA-13 (Battagram) after the delimitation in 2022.

== Members of Parliament ==
=== 1977–2002: (Mansehra III : Now Battagram) ===
Election	Member	Party
1977	Haji Faqir Muhammad Khan Swati	PNA
1985	Nawab Muhammad Ayub Khan Swati (Nawab of Allai)	Independent
1988	Nawab Muhammad Ayub Khan Swati	IJI
1990	Alam Zeb Khan Swati (Khan of Thakot)	JUI-F
1993	Nawab Muhammad Ayub Khan Swati	PML-N
1997	Prince Muhammad Nawaz Khan Swati (Prince of Allai)	PML-N

=== 2002–2018: NA-22 (Battagram) ===
Election	Member	Party
2002	Qari Muhammad Yousuf Swati	MMA
2008	Prince Nawaz Khan Swati	PML (Q)
2013	Qari Muhammad Yousuf Swati	JUI (F)

=== 2018–2023: NA-12 (Battagram) ===
Election	Member	Party
2018	Muhammad Nawaz Khan Allai	PTI

=== Since 2024: NA-13 (Battagram) ===
Election	Member	Party
2024	Muhammad Nawaz Khan Allai	SIC

== Detailed Results ==
=== 2002 general election ===
2002 General Election: NA-22 (Battagram)
Party	Candidate	Votes	%	±%
MMA	Qari Muhammad Yousuf	24,092	52.61	
PML-Q	Muhammad Nawaz Khan Allai	10,875	23.75	
Independent	Bakht Nawaz Khan	9,609	20.98	
Independent	Inayatullah Khan	1,216	2.66	
Majority		13,217	28.86	
Turnout		45,792	33.77	
MMA gain from PML (N)				

A total of 1,422 votes were rejected.

=== 2008 general election ===
2008 General Election: NA-22 (Battagram)
Party	Candidate	Votes	%	±%
PML	Muhammad Nawaz Khan Allai	22,316	40.54	
MMA	Qari Muhammad Yousuf	20,036	36.40	−16.21
Independent	Ihsanullah Khan	5,155	9.37	
PML-N	Niaz Muhammad Khan	4,881	8.87	
Independent	Imran Khan	1,591	2.89	
Independent	Muhammad Israr ul Haq Haqqani	575	1.04	
PPPP	Ajmal Khan	489	0.89	
Majority		2,280	4.14	
Turnout		55,043	36.69	+2.92
PML gain from MMA				

A total of 1,027 votes were rejected.

=== 2013 general election ===
2013 General Election: NA-22 (Battagram)
Party	Candidate	Votes	%	±%
JUI-F	Muhammad Yousuf	18,572	26.07	
Independent	Muhammad Nawaz Khan Allai	13,092	18.38	
PML-N	Alamzeb Khan	12,214	17.15	+8.28
Independent	Attaullah Khan Trand	10,698	15.02	
Independent	Sardar Malik Jan	9,120	12.80	
PTI	Niaz Mohammad Khan	2,370	3.33	
Independent	Sabir Hussain Shah	1,924	2.70	
Independent	Baber Khan	1,012	1.42	
JI	Nisar Ahmad	679	0.95	
Independent	Mohammad Saleem Malik	421	0.59	
MDM	Qari Faqir Mohammad Hazarvi	344	0.48	
Independent	Musbah Allah Baber	252	0.35	
Independent	Nosherwan Khan	185	0.26	
QWP (S)	Fida Mohammad	168	0.24	
PPPP	Akhtar Javid Khan	105	0.15	−0.74
Independent	Naeemullah Khan Trand	53	0.07	
MQM	Maulana Abdul Baqi Torkhel	27	0.04	
Majority		5,480	7.69	
Turnout		71,236	35.78	−0.91
JUI (F) gain from PML				

A total of 3,400 votes were rejected.

=== 2018 general election ===
General elections were held on 25 July 2018.

General election 2018: NA-12 (Battagram)
Party	Candidate	Votes	%	±%
PTI	Muhammad Nawaz Khan Allai	34,270	37.40	▲34.07
MMA	Muhammad Yousuf	23,881	26.06	▼1.44^{†}
PPP	Sardar Malik Jan	12,427	13.56	▲13.41
Independent	Rasheed Ahmed	11,791	12.87	▲12.87
Others	Others (four candidates)	5,819	6.35	
Turnout		91,643	35.50	▼0.28
Rejected ballots		3,455	3.77	
Majority		10,389	11.34	
Registered electors		258,155		
PTI gain from JUI (F)				

^{†}Change from combined vote of JUI-F, JI, and MDM in 2013

=== 2024 general election ===
General elections were held on 8 February 2024. Muhammad Nawaz Khan Allai won the election with 32,647 votes.

General election 2024: NA-13 Battagram
Party	Candidate	Votes	%	±%
PTI	Muhammad Nawaz Khan Allai (Note: Filed nomination papers as PTI candidate but ECP allowed him to run as an Independent)	32,647	35.66	▼1.74
JUI (F)	Muhanmad Yousuf	21,542	23.53	N/A
PRHP	Atta Muhammad	18,082	19.75	N/A
Others	Others (eight candidates)	19,273	21.05	
Turnout		94,999	28.88	▼6.62
Rejected ballots		3,455	3.64	
Majority		11,105	12.13	▲0.79
Registered electors		328,902		

== See also ==
- NA-12 Kohistan-cum-Lower Kohistan-cum-Kolai Palas Kohistan
- NA-14 Mansehra
