= NA-11 Shangla =

Constituency of the National Assembly of Pakistan

- Constituency for the National Assembly of Pakistan
- Region: Shangla District
- Electorate: 465,602

Current constituency
- Party: PML(N)
- Member: Amir Muqam
- Created from: NA-10 Shangla

NA-11 Shangla (این اے-11، شانگلہ) is a constituency for the National Assembly of Pakistan. It covers the whole of district Shangla in Khyber Pakhtunkhwa. The constituency was formerly known as NA-31 (Shangla) from 1977 to 2018. The name changed to NA-10 (Shangla) after the delimitation in 2018 and NA-11 (Shangla) after the delimitation in 2022.

== Members of Parliament ==
=== 1977–2002: NA-31 Shangla ===
Election	Member	Party
1977	Said Khan	Independent
1985	Malik Said Khan Mahsad	Independent
1988	Malik Sakhi Jan	Independent
1990	Malik Sakhi Jan	Independent
1993	Abdul Qayyum Khan	Independent
1997	Maulana Noor Muhammad	Independent

=== 2002–2018: NA-31 Shangla ===
Election	Member	Party
2002	Amir Muqam	MMA
2008	Amir Muqam	PML
2013	Ibadullah Khan	PML (N)

=== 2018–2022: NA-10 Shangla ===
Election	Member	Party
2018	Ibadullah Khan	PML (N)

=== 2024–present: NA-11 Shangla ===
Election	Member	Party
2024	Amir Muqam	PML (N)

== Elections since 2002 ==
=== 2002 general election ===
2002 General Election: NA-31 (Shangla)
Party	Candidate	Votes	%	±%
MMA	Amir Muqam	25,960	43.21	
ANP	Safeer Khan	18,676	31.08	
PPPP	Afsar-ul-Mulk	11,769	19.59	
PML-N	Jamal Zeb Khan	2,743	4.56	
Independent	Muhammad Saleem Khan	531	0.88	
Independent	Ibadullah	406	0.68	
Majority		7,284	12.13	
Turnout		60,085	27.40	
MMA gain from Independent				

A total of 1,677 votes were rejected.

=== 2008 general election ===
2008 General Election: NA-31 (Shangla)
Party	Candidate	Votes	%	±%
PML	Amir Muqam	26,928	42.40	
ANP	Sadid ur Rehman	15,740	24.78	−6.30
PPPP	Dr Afsar ul Mulk Khan	12,999	20.47	+0.88
MMA	Rahat Hussain	6,477	10.20	−33.01
Independent	Safeer Khan	1,171	1.85	
Independent	Muhammad Saleem	193	0.30	−0.58
Majority		11,188	17.62	
Turnout		63,508	26.04	−1.36
PML(Q) gain from MMA				

A total of 2,867 votes were rejected.

=== 2013 general election ===
2013 General Election: NA-31 (Shangla)
Party	Candidate	Votes	%	±%
PML-N	Ibadullah Khan	30,916	33.33	
ANP	Sadid ur Rehman	21,682	23.38	−1.40
PPPP	Engineer Hamid Iqbal Khan	11,061	11.93	−8.54
JUI-F	Rahat Hussain	8,407	9.06	
PTI	Nawaz Mehmood Khan	6,120	6.60	
JI	Doctor Muhammad Anwar Shah	4,579	4.94	
Independent	Maulana Qari Mushtaq Ahmad	3,986	4.30	
AWP	Fanoos Gujar	3,954	4.26	
Independent	Safeer Khan	1,590	1.72	−0.13
PML	Abdur Raj Khan	252	0.27	−42.13
MQM	Ghazanfar Anjum Yousafzai Advocate	134	0.14	
Independent	Mian Nazir Rahman	63	0.07	
Majority		9,234	9.95	
Turnout		92,744	31.67	+5.63
PML-N gain from PML				

A total of 4,093 votes were rejected.

=== 2018 general election ===
General elections were held on 25 July 2018.

Contest overview

This constituency has been previously won by Ibadullah Khan in 2013 and his brother Amir Muqam in 2002 and 2008. Khan contested again on Pakistan Muslim League (N) ticket and won in 2018.

Results

General election 2018: NA-10 (Shangla)
Party	Candidate	Votes	%	±%
PML(N)	Ibadullah Khan	34,070	26.55	▼6.78
ANP	Sadeedur Rehman	32,665	25.46	▲2.08
PTI	Waqar Ahmad Khan	27,832	21.69	▲15.09
MMA	Ameer Sultan	20,800	16.21	▲2.21^{†}
Others	Others (five candidates)	8,303	6.47	
Turnout		128,302	34.27	▲2.60
Rejected ballots		4,632	3.62	
Majority		1,405	1.09	
Registered electors		374,343		
PML(N) hold		Swing	N/A	

^{†}JUI-F, and JI contested as part of MMA

=== 2024 general election ===
General elections were held on 8 February 2024. Amir Muqam won the election with 61,204 votes.

General election 2024: NA-11 Shangla
Party	Candidate	Votes	%	±%
PML(N)	Amir Muqam	61,204	41.08	▲14.53
PTI	Said Fareen (Note: Filed nomination papers as PTI candidate but ECP allowed him to run as an Independent)	55,312	37.12	▲15.43
ANP	Aurang Zeb	10,621	7.13	▼18.33
Others	Others (thirteen candidates)	21,865	14.67	
Turnout		154,842	33.26	▼1.01
Rejected ballots		5,840	3.77	
Majority		5,892	3.95	▲2.86
Registered electors		465,602		
PML(N) hold				

== See also ==
- NA-10 Buner
- NA-12 Kohistan-cum-Lower Kohistan-cum-Kolai Palas Kohistan
