= Sahibzada Sibghatullah =

Pakistani politician

Member of the National Assembly of Pakistan
- Incumbent
- Assumed office 29 February 2024
- Constituency: NA-5 Upper Dir
- In office 13 August 2018 – 20 January 2023
- Constituency: NA-5 (Upper Dir)

Personal details
- Party: PTI (2018-present)
- Relations: Sahabzada Tariq Ullah (cousin)

Sahibzada Sibghatullah is a Pakistani politician who has been a member of the National Assembly of Pakistan since February 2024 and from August 2018 till January 2023.

== Political career ==
He ran for a seat in the National Assembly of Pakistan as an independent candidate from NA-33 Upper Dir-cum-Lower Dir in the 2008 Pakistani general election, but was unsuccessful. He received 19,910 votes and was defeated by Najmuddin Khan, a candidate of the Pakistan People's Party (PPP).

He was elected to the National Assembly as a candidate of Pakistan Tehreek-e-Insaf (PTI) from Constituency NA-5 (Upper Dir) in the 2018 Pakistani general election. He received 66,545 votes and defeated Najmuddin Khan, a candidate of the PPP.

He was arrested on 6 August 2023 under the Maintenance of Public Order Ordinance after the Deputy Commissioner of Upper Dir District claimed that "he was involved in spreading hatred against government, defaming law enforcement agencies and provoking public against the government". He was released due to the Peshawar High Court (PHC) accepting his petition of release, declaring his detention illegal.
