= 1970 Pakistani general election in North-West Frontier Province =

7 December 1970	1977 →

19 seats from North-West Frontier Province in the National Assembly
- Turnout: 47.94
	First party	Second party	Third party
	PML (Qayyum)	JUI-WP	NAP-W
Leader	Abdul Qayyum Khan	Mufti Mahmud	Abdul Wali Khan
Party	PML (Qayyum)	Jamiat Ulema-e-Islam	NAP(W)
Leader since	1970	1968	1967
Leader's seat	NW-8 Hazara (won) NW-11 Hazara-cum Mardan (won)(vacated) NW-1 Peshawar-I (won)(vacated)	NW-13 D.I Khan	NW-3 Peshawar-III
Seats won	7	6	3
Seat change	▲7	▲6	▲3
Popular vote	3,25,924	3,66,466	2,66,282
Percentage	22.83	25.67%	18.65%
Swing	▲22.83	▲25.67	▲18.65
	Fourth party	Fifth party
	PPP	JI
Leader	Zulfikar Ali Bhutto	not declared
Party	PPP	JI
Leader since	30 November 1967	-
Leader's seat	NW-13 D.I Khan (lost)	-
Seats won	1	1
Seat change	▲1	▲1
Popular vote	2,05,599	1,03,958
Percentage	14.40%	7.28%
Swing	▲14.40	▲7.28
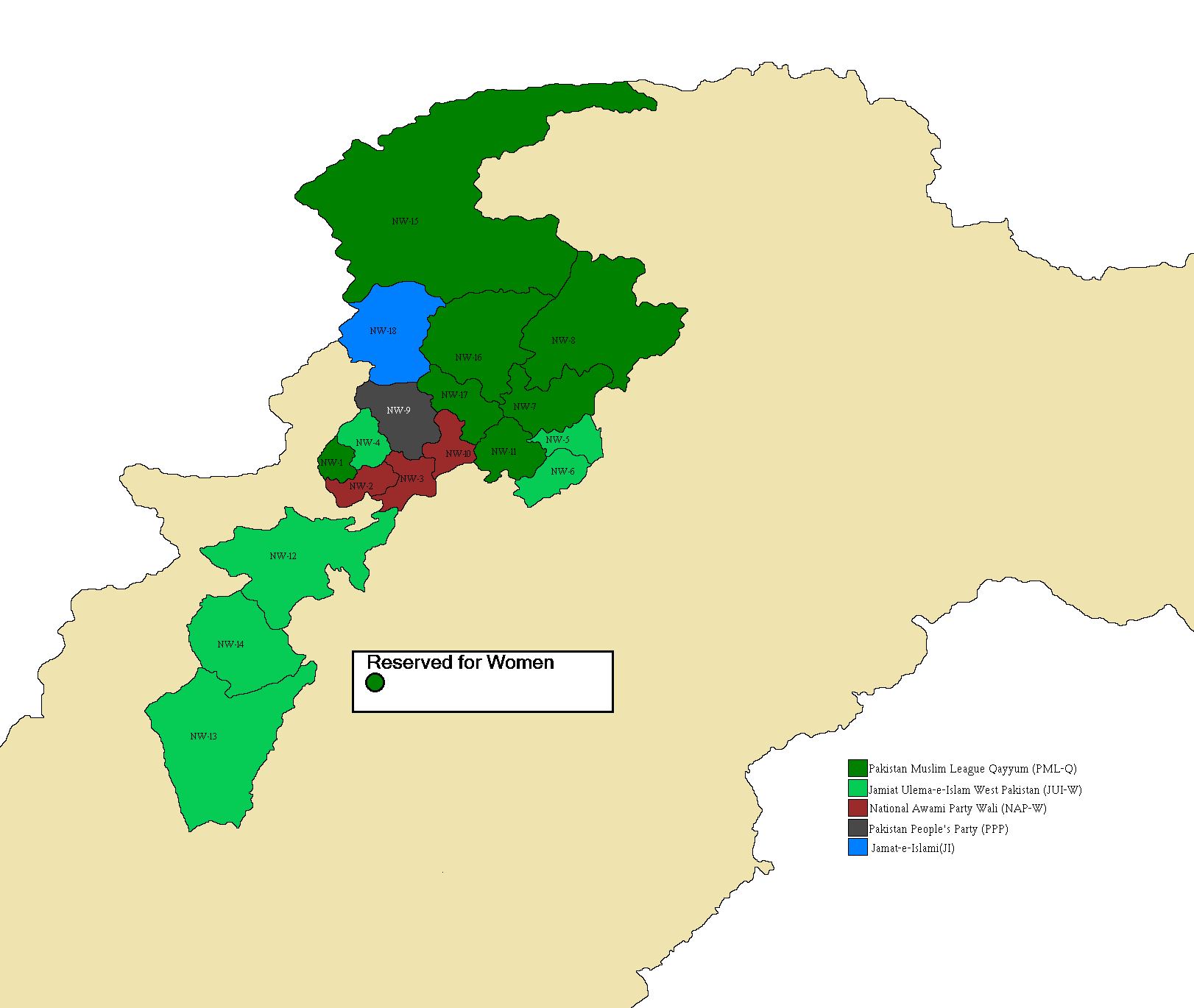

General Elections were held in North-West Frontier Province on Monday 7 December 1970 to elect 19 Members of 5th National Assembly of Pakistan. Out of 19 National Assembly seats 18 were General seats and 1 was reserved for woman.

Pakistan Muslim League Qayyum emerged as the largest party in North-West Frontier Province by winning 7 seats. Jamiat Ulema-e-Islam (West Pakistan) became 2nd largest party by winning 6 seats. Pakistan People's Party and Jamat-e-Islami won 1 seats each. Pakistan Muslim League Qayyum won 1 Reserved seat for Woman.

== Result ==
Vote Share of different parties in the election.
1. PML (Qayyum) (22.23%)
2. JUI-WP (25%)
3. NAP-Wali (18.17%)
4. PPP (14.03%)
5. JI (7.09%)
6. Other Parties (5.74%)
7. IND (5.12%)
Seat Share of different parties in the election.
1. PML (Qayyum) (42.1%)
2. JUI-WP (31.58%)
3. NAP-Wali (15.78%)
4. PPP (5.26%)
5. JI (5.26%)

Party	Votes	%	Seats		
Party	Votes	%	General	Woman	Total
Pakistan Muslim League (Qayyum)	325,924	22.83	7	1	8
Jamiat Ulema-e-Islam	366,466	25.67	6	0	6
National Awami Party (Wali)	266,282	18.65	3	0	3
Pakistan Peoples Party	205,599	14.40	1	0	1
Jamaat-e-Islami Pakistan	103,958	7.28	1	0	1
Other parties	84,990	5.95	0	0	0
Independents	74,217	5.20	0	0	0
Total	1,427,436	100.00	18	1	19
Valid votes	1,427,436	97.38			
Invalid/blank votes	38,380	2.62			
Total votes	1,465,816	100.00			
Registered voters/turnout	3,057,546	47.94			
Source: Election Pakistani

== By constituency ==
	Assembly Constituency	Winner				Runner-up				Margin		Turnout
	Assembly Constituency	Candidate	Party	Votes		Candidate	Party	Votes		Margin		Turnout
	Assembly Constituency	Candidate	Party	No.	%	Candidate	Party	No.	%	No.	%	%
1	NW-1 Peshawar-I	Abdul Qayyum Khan	PML (Qayyum)	27,215	29.45	Hayat Khan Sherpao	PPP	23,981	25.95	3,234	3.50	62.15
2	NW-2 Peshawar-II	Ghulam Hayat Khan	NAP-Wali	34,402	39.49	Mian M Jan	JUI-WP	22,529	25.86	11,873	13.63	56.48
3	NW-3 Peshawar-III	Abdul Wali Khan	NAP-Wali	35,220	46.51	Abdul Barjan	JUI-WP	22,871	30.20	12,349	16.31	57.57
4	NW-4 Peshawar-IV	Molana Abdul Haq	JUI-WP	29,856	35.54	M Ajmal Khattak	NAP-Wali	27,109	32.27	2,747	3.27	62.86
5	NW-5 Hazara-I	Molana Abdul Hakeem	JUI-WP	12,915	44.67	Ayub Khan	IND	8,553	29.58	4,362	15.09	29.61
6	NW-6 Hazara-II	Molana ghulam Ghous Hazarvi	JUI-WP	27,188	37.69	Hanif Khan	PML (Qayyum)	19,595	27.17	7,593	10.52	38.79
7	NW-7 Hazara-III	Inayat Ur Rehman Khan	PML (Qayyum)	39,746	44.55	Ali Bahadur	IND	25,372	28.44	14,374	16.11	44.69
8	NW-8 Hazara-IV	Abdul Qayyum Khan	PML (Qayyum)	38,305	45.01	Sardar Bahadar Khan	PML(C)	22,335	26.25	15,970	18.76	42.31
9	NW-9 Mardan-I	Abdul Khaliq Khan	PPP	26,653	26.81	Meher Dil Khan	NAP-Wali	21,033	21.16	5,620	5.65	63.93
10	NW-10 Mardan-II	Amirzada Khan	NAP-Wali	34,032	39.79	Moulvi Hamdullah Khan	JUI-WP	17,119	20.01	16,913	19.78	71.72
11	NW-11 Mardan-cum-Hazara	Abdul Qayyum Khan	PML (Qayyum)	26,415	31.86	Abdul Aziz Khan	NAP-Wali	19,815	23.90	6,600	7.96	51.78
12	NW-12 Kohat	Molvi Naimatullah	JUI-WP	35,817	40.25	Muhammad Yousaf Khattak	PML(C)	15,014	16.87	20,803	23.38	35.94
13	NW-13 Dera Ismail Khan	Mufti Mahmud	JUI-WP	45,978	44.48	Zulfikar Ali Bhutto	PPP	33,267	32.19	12,711	12.29	53.62
14	NW-14 Bannu	Moulana Sadar us Shahid	JUI-WP	60,511	57.41	Malik Hamidullah Khan	PML (Qayyum)	14,896	14.13	45,209	43.28	65.90
15	NW-15 Chitral-cum-Swat	Ataliq Jafar Ali Shah	PML (Qayyum)	6,418	18.44	M Nadir Khan	JUI-WP	5,835	16.77	583	1.67	36.55
16	NW-16 Swat-I	Rahim Shah	PML (Qayyum)	18,761	22.87	Sher M Khan	PPP	18,481	22.53	280	0.34	39.49
17	NW-17 Swat-II	Mian Gul Aurangzeb	PML (Qayyum)	35,538	34.27	Syed Badshah Gul	NAP-Wali	23,276	22.45	12,262	11.82	41.00
18	NW-18 Dir	Sahabzada Saifullah	JI	14,187	21.80	Jahanzeb Khan	IND	14,036	21.57	151	0.23	30.39
