= Abdul Halim Khan =

Pakistani politician

Abdul Halim Khan is a politician, a Muslim cleric, and an ex MNA from Kohistan, Pakistan. He belongs to the Muttahida Majlis-e-Amal Pakistan party and won the NA-23 (Kohistan) constituency seat in 2002. He holds the view that "girls should not be educated, women should not work unless accompanied by mahrams and 'honour' killing is a religiously-sanctioned practice", and has threatened that women working for NGOs who enter Kohistan will be forcibly married.
