= Sar Zamin Khan =

Pakistani politician

- سرزمین خان

Member of the National Assembly of Pakistan
- In office 1 June 2013 – 31 May 2018
- Constituency: NA-23 (Kohistan)

Personal details
- Born: 3 April 1981 (age 45)
- Party: Pakistan Muslim League (N)

Sar Zamin Khan (Urdu: سرزمین خان; born 3 April 1981) is a Pakistani politician who had been a member of the National Assembly of Pakistan, from June 2013 to May 2018.

== Early life ==
He was born on 3 April 1981.

== Political career ==
Khan was elected to the National Assembly of Pakistan as an independent candidate from Constituency NA-23 (Kohistan) in the 2013 Pakistani general election. He received 17498 votes and defeated a candidate of Jamiat Ulema-e Islam (F).

He later joined Pakistan Muslim League (N). During his tenure as Member of the National Assembly, he served as the Federal Parliamentary Secretary for Textile Industry. In October 2017, he was made Federal Parliamentary Secretary for Statistics.
