= Salim Rehman =

Pakistani politician

- سلیم رحمان

Member of the National Assembly of Pakistan
- In office 13 August 2018 – 20 January 2023
- Constituency: NA-3 (Swat-II)
- In office 1 June 2013 – 31 May 2018
- Constituency: NA-30 (Swat-II)

President of PTI, Swat District
- Incumbent
- Assumed office 7 August 2022
- Chairman: Imran Khan; Gohar Ali Khan

Personal details
- Born: 1 January 1967 (age 59) Swat District, Khyber Pakhtunkhwa, Pakistan
- Party: PTI (2013-present)
- Other political affiliations: PPP (2002-2013)

Salim Rehman (Urdu: سلیم رحمان; born 1 January 1967) is a Pakistani politician from Pakistan Tehreek-e-Insaf, who has been a member of the National Assembly of Pakistan since February 2024. He previously served as a member from August 2018 till January 2023.

He successfully won the election of the National Assembly twice on Pakistan Tehreek-e-Insaf's ticket from NA-3 (Swat-II) in August 2018 and the 2013 Pakistani general election from NA-30 (Swat-II). He remained a member of the national assembly between June 2013 to May 2018.

== Early life ==
He was born on 1 January 1967.

== Political career ==
Rehman ran for the seat of the National Assembly of Pakistan as a candidate of Pakistan Peoples Party (PPP) from Constituency NA-30 (Swat-II) in the 2002 Pakistani general election but was unsuccessful. He secured 10,867 votes and lost the seat to a candidate of Muttahida Majlis-e-Amal.

Rehman ran for the seat of National Assembly of Pakistan as a candidate of PPP from Constituency NA-29 (Swat-I) in the 2008 Pakistani general election but was unsuccessful, He secured 12,774 votes and lost the seat to a candidate of Awami National Party.

Rehman was elected to the National Assembly as a candidate of Pakistan Tehreek-e-Insaf (PTI) from Constituency NA-30 (Swat-II) in the 2013 Pakistani general election. He received 49,976 votes and defeated Amir Muqam.

He was re-elected to the National Assembly as a candidate of PTI from Constituency NA-3 (Swat-II) in the 2018 Pakistani general election. He received 68,162 votes and defeated Shehbaz Sharif.
