= Akhun Kalai =

Akhun Kalay
- Location within Pakistan
- Coordinates: 34.46°N 72.17°E
- Country: Pakistan
- Province: Khyber-Pakhtunkhwa

Area
  - Total: 8 km^{2} (3.1 sq mi)
- Elevation: 845 m (2,772 ft)

Population (2017)
  - Estimate: 2,882
- Time zone: UTC+5 (PST)
- Website: http://akhunkalay.blogspot.com

Akhun Kalay is a small village in Swat District of Khyber-Pakhtunkhwa. It is situated about two kilometers from Kabal chowk on Kabal-Chakdara road.
