= Amir Muqam =

Pakistani politician

- امیر مقام
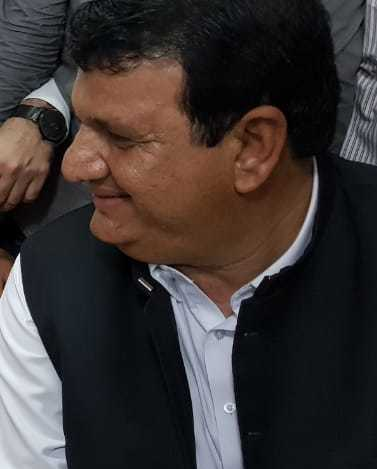

Ministry of Kashmir Affairs and Gilgit-Baltistan
- Incumbent
- Assumed office 29 March 2024
- President: Asif Ali Zardari
- Prime Minister: Shehbaz Sharif

Ministry of States and Frontier Regions (Pakistan)
- Incumbent
- Assumed office 11 March 2024
- President: Asif Ali Zardari
- Prime Minister: Shehbaz Sharif

National Heritage and Culture Division (Pakistan)
- In office 11 March 2024 – 28 March 2025
- President: Asif Ali Zardari
- Prime Minister: Shehbaz Sharif
- Preceded by: Aurangzeb Khan Khichi
- Succeeded by: Attaullah Tarar

Advisor to Prime Minister for National Heritage and Culture
- In office April 2022 – August 2023
- President: Arif Alvi
- Prime Minister: Shehbaz Sharif

Ministry of Parliamentary Affairs (Pakistan)
- In office September 2013 – April 2018
- President: Mamnoon Hussain
- Prime Minister: Nawaz Sharif

Federal Minister for Industries and Production
- In office 3 May 2011 – 19 June 2012
- President: Pervez Musharraf
- Prime Minister: Yusuf Raza Gillani

Federal Minister for Political Affairs
- In office 25 April 2006 – 15 November 2007
- President: Pervez Musharraf
- Prime Minister: Shaukat Aziz

Minister of State for Water and Power
- In office 2 September 2004 – 24 April 2006
- President: Pervez Musharraf
- Prime Minister: Shaukat Aziz

Member of National Assembly of Pakistan
- Incumbent
- Assumed office 29 February 2024
- Constituency: NA-11 Shangla
- In office 17 March 2008 – 16 March 2013
- Constituency: NA-31 Shangla
- In office 16 November 2002 – 15 November 2007
- Constituency: NA-31 Shangla

Personal details
- Born: 25 July 1963 (age 63) Puran Tehsil, West Pakistan, Pakistan
- Citizenship: Pakistan
- Party: PMLN (2012-present)
- Other political affiliations: PML(Q) (2002-2013); MMA (2002)
- Relations: Ibadullah Khan (brother)
- Children: Niaz Amir Muqam (son)
- Education: University of Peshawar
- Profession: Politician

Amir Muqam is a Pakistani politician who is serving as the Federal Minister for Kashmir affairs and Gilgit Baltistan along with States and frontier regions in second Shehbaz Sharif cabinet. He is affiliated with PML(N) and serving as its Provincial President in Khyber pakhtunkhwa. He was a close aide to former military dictator Pervez Musharraf. He previously served as advisor to the prime minister on political affairs in the Third Nawaz Sharif ministry and Abbasi government. He is also a member of the National Assembly of Pakistan. Previously, he was a member of the National Assembly from 2002 to 2007 and again from 2008 to 2013. Muqam has been a member of the National Assembly of Pakistan since February 29, 2024.

Subsequently, on March 11, 2024, he assumed office as a federal minister in the Shehbaz Sharif cabinet, overseeing the ministries of States and Frontier Regions, along with National Heritage and Culture.

== Early life ==
Amir Muqam was born at village Chagum Puran Tehsil in Shangla town, Khyber-Pakhtunkhwa, Pakistan, on 25 July 1963 into a Pakhtoon family. After matriculating from a local high school, Muqam enrolled at the University of Engineering and Technology in Peshawar in 1983 to study engineering. In 1988, Muqam graduated from UET Peshawar with BSc in Mechanical engineering. His brother Ibadullah Khan is also politician in Pakistan Muslim League (N) (PML-N).

== Political career ==
In 1998, Muqam was elected as general secretary of the Cantonments Association till he remained until 2001. In 2001, Muqam was elected unopposed as Nazim of Bengali Chagum Union Council after participating in local government elections. Amir Muqam won the 2002 Pakistani general election on the ticket of Muttahida Majlis Amal from NA-31 constituency. However, after winning elections Muqam defected to PML(Q) to support Gen. Pervez Musharraf. During Pervez Musharraf tenure he enjoyed close ties with him, Pervez Musharraf called him his brother and gifted him a personal Glock pistol. Muqam was made Minister of State for Water and Power and Political Affairs. Muqam won the general elections from NA 38 Shangla on PML(Q) ticket. He obtained 25,960 against his opponent Safeer Khan from ANP.

Before the 2013 Pakistani general election he left PML(Q) on reportedly some difference with Chaudhry Shujaat Hussain Muqam announced to join the PML(N) after holding a meeting with Nawaz Sharif and was appointed Senior vice President of the party.

Amir Muqam contested from NA-30 (Swat-II) in the 2013 Pakistani general election, however, he lost the seat from Salim Rehman of Pakistan Tehreek-e-Insaf.

In the 2018 Pakistani general election Muqam contested two national assembly and two provisional assembly seats, however, he lost all fours seats. From NA-2 (Swat-I) he got 41125 votes and stood second, from NA-29 (Peshawar-III) he stood fifth and obtained just 10569 votes. He also lost two provisional seats PK-2 (Swat) and PK 4 (Swat 3).

== Electoral history ==
National Assembly of Pakistan
Year	Constituency	Party	Votes	Result
2002	NA 31 (Shangla)	MMA	28,960	Won
2008	NA 31 (Shangla)	PML (Q)	26,928	Won
2013	NA-30 (Swat-II)	PML (N)	33,027	Lost
2018	NA 2 (Swat-I)	PML (N)	41,125	Lost
2024	NA 11 (Shangla)	PML (N)	59863	Won

=== 2002 ===
Amir Muqam contested the elections on MMA ticket however, after winning the election he defected to General Pervaiz Musharraf's PML(Q).

2002 General Election: NA-31 (Shangla)
Party	Candidate	Votes	%	±%
MMA	Amir Muqam	25,960	43.21	
ANP	Safeer Khan	18,676	31.08	
PPPP	Afsar-ul-Mulk	11,769	19.59	
PML-N	Jamal Zeb Khan	2,743	4.56	
Independent	Muhammad Saleem Khan	531	0.88	
Independent	Ibadullah	406	0.68	
Majority		7,284	12.13	
Turnout		60,085	27.40	
MMA gain from Independent				

=== 2008 ===
Muqam contested 2008 Pakistani general election on PML(Q)'s ticket and won from NA-31 (Shangla). However, later he developed a difference with Chaudhry Shujaat Hussain and joined PML(N).

2008 General Election: NA-31 (Shangla)
Party	Candidate	Votes	%	±%
PML	Engineer Amir Muqam	26,928	42.40	
ANP	Sadid ur Rehman	15,740	24.78	−6.30
PPPP	Dr Afsar ul Mulk Khan	12,999	20.47	+0.88
MMA	Rahat Hussain	6,477	10.20	−33.01
Independent	Safeer Khan	1,171	1.85	
Independent	Muhammad Saleem	193	0.30	−0.58
Majority		11,188	17.62	
Turnout		63,508	26.04	−1.36
PML gain from MMA				

=== 2013 ===
Amir Muqam Contested 2013 from NA-30 (Swat-II) however, he lost the seat from Salim Rehman of Pakistan Tehreek-e-Insaf.

General Election 2013: NA-30 (Swat-II)
Party	Candidate	Votes	%
PTI	Salim Rehman	49,976	31.49
PML(N)	Amir Muqam	33,027	20.81
JUI (F)	Muhammad Hafiz-ur-Rahman	16,704	10.52
PPP	Syed Allauddin	16,373	10.32
ANP	Khurshid	15,595	9.83
JI	Fazal-e-Subhan	11,367	7.16
Valid ballots		158,717	95.64
Rejected ballots		7,228	4.36
Turnout		165,945	35.88
Majority		16,949	10.68
PTI gain from PPP			

=== 2018 ===
In 2018, Amir Muqam contested two provisional seats NA-29 (Peshawar-III) and NA-2 (Swat-I). He finished fourth in NA-29 (Peshawar-III) and second in NA-2 (Swat-I). He also contested two provisional seats PK-2 (Swat) and PK 4 (Swat 3) and lost both.

General election 2018: NA-29 (Peshawar-III)
Party	Candidate	Votes	%	±%
PTI	Nasir Khan Yousafzai	49,762	39.64	
MMA	Naeem Jan	29,357	23.38	
ANP	Arbab Kamal Ahmed Khan	20,392	16.24	
PML(N)	Amir Muqam	15,458	12.31	
TLP	Muhammad Shafeeq	10,569	8.42	
Turnout		130,157	40.62	
Total valid votes		125,538	96.45	
Rejected ballots		4,619	3.55	
Majority		20,405	16.26	
Registered electors		320,401		
PTI win (new seat)				

General election 2018: NA-2 (Swat-I)
Party	Candidate	Votes	%
PTI	Haider Ali Khan	61,687	37.21
PML(N)	Amir Muqam	41,125	24.81
MMA	Naveed Iqbal	18,055	10.89
PPP	Amjad Ali Khan	16,018	9.66
ANP	Mumtaz Ahmed Chamoot	14,618	8.82
Others	Others (five candidates)	5,557	3.35

== Controversies and Scandals ==
The National Accountability Bureau summoned Muqam in assets beyond his known sources cases multiple times. A new reference was filed against Amir Muqam in 2021.

Amir Muqam's son was arrested over corruption charges in the construction of Alpari Road in KP's Shangla district by the Federal Investigation Agency, the project was assigned during the Pakistan Muslim League (N) tenure on the recommendation of Ameer Muqam.
