= Muhammad Yousuf (politician) =

Pakistani politician (1952–2026)

Qari Muhammad Yousuf
- محمد یوسف

Member of the National Assembly of Pakistan
- In office 1 June 2013 – 31 May 2018
- Constituency: NA-22 (Battagram)
- In office 18 November 2002 – 18 November 2007
- Constituency: NA-22 (Battagram)

Personal details
- Born: 1 January 1952
- Died: 19 January 2026 (aged 74) Islamabad, Pakistan
- Party: PRHP (2025–2026)
- Other political affiliations: MMA (2002–2013); JUI (F) (2013–2025)

Qari Muhammad Yousaf (Urdu: قاری محمد یوسف; 1 January 1952 – 19 January 2026) was a Pakistani politician who was a member of the National Assembly of Pakistan, from June 2013 to May 2018. Previously, he had been a member of the National Assembly from 2002 to 2007.

== Early life ==
Yousuf was born on 1 January 1952 into a Deshani family, a subcaste of the Swati ethnic group.

== Political career ==
Yousuf was elected to the National Assembly of Pakistan as a candidate of Muttahida Majlis-e-Amal (MMA) from Constituency NA-22 (Battagram) in the 2002 Pakistani general election. He received 24,092 votes and defeated Muhammad Nawaz Khan, a candidate of Pakistan Muslim League (Q) (PML-Q).

He ran for the seat of the National Assembly as a candidate of MMA from Constituency NA-22 (Battagram) in the 2008 Pakistani general election but was unsuccessful. He received 20,036 votes and lost the seat to Muhammad Nawaz Khan, a candidate of PML-Q.

Yousuf was re-elected to the National Assembly as a candidate of Jamiat Ulema-e-Islam (F) from Constituency NA-22 (Battagram) in the 2013 Pakistani general election. He received 18,314 votes and defeated Mohammad Nawaz Khan, an independent candidate.

== Death ==
Yousaf passed away at a hospital in Islamabad, on 19 January 2026, at the age of 74.

== See also ==
- List of Deobandis
- Swatis
