= Murad Saeed =

Pakistani politician (born 1986)

- مراد سعید
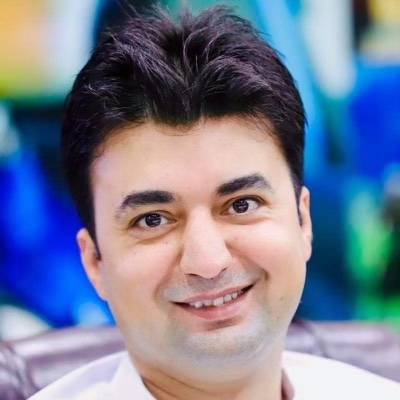

Federal Minister for Communications and Postal Services
- In office 17 December 2018 – 10 April 2022
- Prime Minister: Imran Khan
- Preceded by: Himself as State Minister

Minister of State for Postal Services
- In office 26 October 2018 – 17 December 2018
- Prime Minister: Imran Khan
- Succeeded by: Himself as Federal Minister

Minister of State for Communications
- In office 18 September 2018 – 17 December 2018
- Succeeded by: Himself as Federal Minister
- Prime Minister: Imran Khan

Minister of State for Frontier Regions
- In office 11 September 2018 – 18 September 2018
- Prime Minister: Imran Khan
- Succeeded by: Shehryar Afridi

Member of the Parliament
- In office 27 July 2025 – 26 March 2026
- Constituency: General Seat from KPK
- In office 13 August 2018 – 17 January 2023
- Constituency: NA-4 (Swat-III)
- In office 1 June 2013 – 31 May 2018
- Constituency: NA-29 (Swat-I)

Personal details
- Born: August 17, 1986 (age 40) Kabal Tehsil, Khyber Pakhtunkhwa, Pakistan
- Party: PTI (2007-present)
- Education: University of Peshawar

Murad Saeed (Urdu: مراد سعید; born 17 August 1986) is a Pakistani politician who served as Federal Minister for Communications and Postal Services from December 2018 to April 2022.

Previously, he served as Minister of State for Communications and Minister of State for Postal Services from 18 September 2018 and 26 October 2018, respectively to December 2018. He had been a member of the National Assembly of Pakistan, from August 2018 till January 2023. Previously, he served as Minister of State for States and Frontier Regions from 11 September to 18 September 2018.

He had also been a member of the National Assembly from June 2013 to May 2018. His term as minister ended on 10 April 2022 when the no-confidence motion against Imran Khan was successful.

== Early life and education ==
Murad Saeed Khan was born on 17 August 1986 at Kabal, Swat.

Saeed holds a Bachelor of Science (Hons) degree in Environmental Sciences from the University of Peshawar.

== Political career ==
=== Student politics ===
Saeed was the founder of Insaf Student Federation, the student wing of Pakistan Tehreek-e-Insaf (PTI) in Khyber Pakhtunkhwa and remained its central president for four years.

=== National Assembly ===
Saeed was elected to the National Assembly of Pakistan as a candidate of PTI from Constituency NA-29 Swat in the 2013 Pakistani general election.

He was re-elected to the National Assembly as a candidate of PTI from Constituency NA-4 (Swat-III) in the 2018 Pakistani general election. He received 71,600 votes and defeated Saleem Khan, a candidate of Awami National Party (ANP).

=== Ministerial positions ===
On 11 September 2018, he was inducted into the federal cabinet of Prime Minister Imran Khan and was appointed Minister of State for States and Frontier Regions. On 18 September, his ministerial portfolio was changed and he was appointed Minister of State for Communications. On 26 October 2018, he was given the additional ministerial portfolio of Postal Services and was appointed Minister of State for Postal Services.

On 17 December 2018, he was elevated as Federal Minister and was appointed Federal Minister for Communications, and Federal Minister for Postal Services.

In 2020 the Auditor General of Pakistan (AGP) found Rs 12.3 billion in fraud and irregularities in the Post Office Department, with a 64 cases of "fraud, misappropriation, embezzlement, theft and dacoity of public", among others, and said it could not authenticate Rs 932bn worth of revenue and Rs 881bn in expenditure due to unapproved methods of accounting and agency accounts maintenance. AGP also reported instances of unbudgeted payments, overpayments, unacknowledged or unadjusted remittances, understating assets, and government accounts (savings, remittances, and BISP) in deficit despite incentive payments to employees. The Pakistan Observer also reported that following an audit into the National Highways Authority (NHA), revealing mismanagement and maladministration, "no apparent action has been taken by Murad Saeed, Minister for Communications on the audit observations so far."

Prime Minister Imran Khan in 2022 announced Murad Saeed as "best performing minister" in the federal cabinet.

== Controversies ==
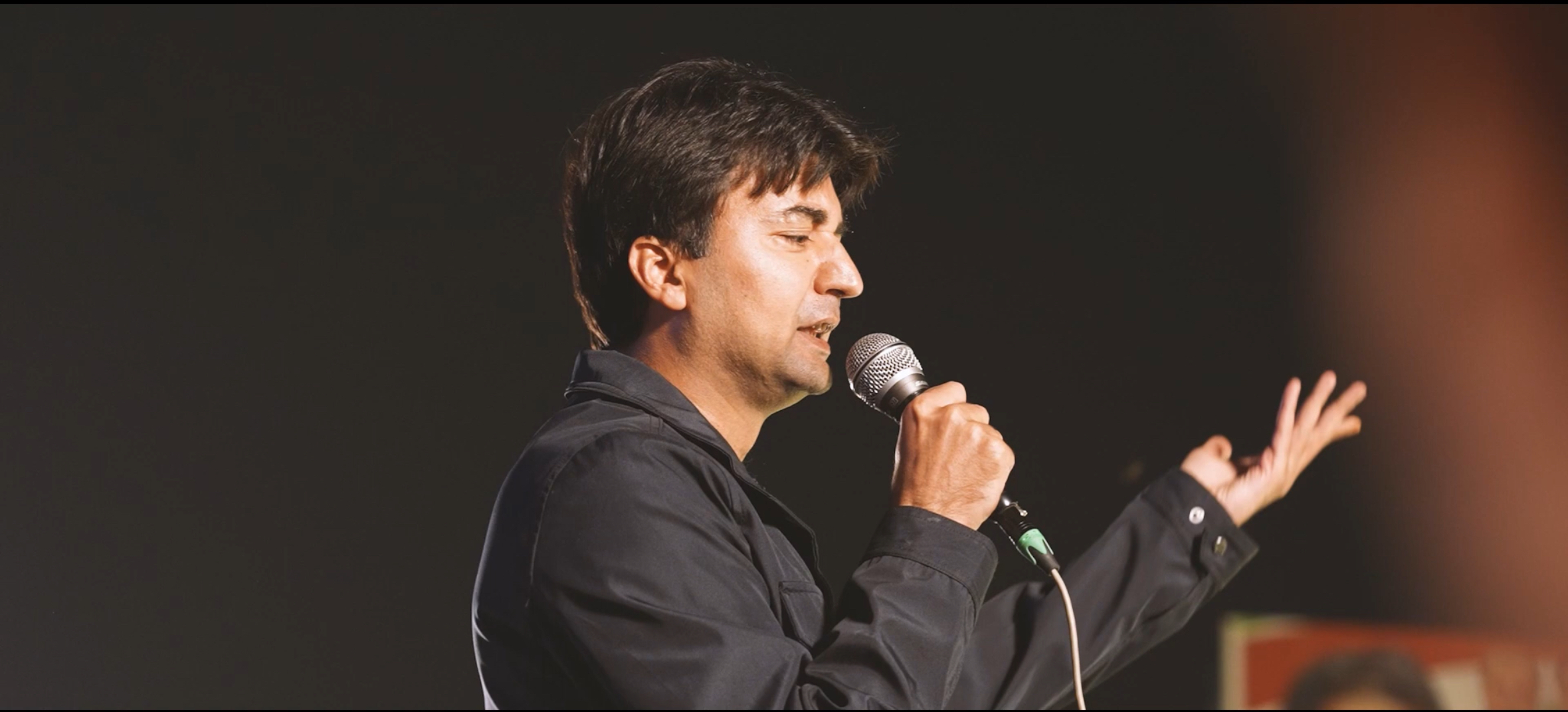
Saeed speaks at the 2022 Azadi March II.

=== Degree authenticity ===
In 2015, the University of Peshawar requested the Peshawar High Court to disqualify Saeed from his National Assembly seat for making a false declaration of his Bachelor of Science degree while filing nomination papers for the 2013 general elections. The University of Peshawar maintained that there are problems found in his make-up examination and said that Saeed's transcripts do not have its official stamp for his B.Sc. degree in Environmental Sciences. However, Murad Saeed refuted these allegations and said that the vice chancellor belonged to a political opponent's party, the Awami National Party. Saeed approached the Peshawar High Court to prove that he had attended University of Peshawar from 2005 to 2009 for his undergraduate degree and passed all his courses. In March 2018, the Peshawar High Court dismissed the petition and closed case against Murad Saeed.

=== Fights in the National Assembly ===
Saeed made national news in March 2017, when a scuffle broke out between him and fellow MNA Mian Javed Latif. Saeed reportedly attempted to assault Javed Latif outside the National Assembly building after Latif made lewd remarks in the assembly about Imran Khan and called him a traitor and a rebel. Latif later apologized for his lewd remarks. The issue was resolved later by the National Assembly Jirga.

In April 2018, Saeed again made national news after a scuffle broke out between him and Abid Sher Ali inside the National Assembly.

== Published works ==
In 2026, Saeed published Duzd-e-Neem Shab ka Raqeeb (Urdu: دزدِ نیم شب کا رقیب). Composed in Urdu, the nearly 400-page book contains political commentary and personal reflections.
