= Afreen Khan =

Pakistani politician

Member of the National Assembly of Pakistan
- In office 13 August 2018 – 10 August 2023
- Constituency: NA-11 (Kohistan-cum-Lower Kohistan-cum-Kolai Palas Kohistan)

Personal details
- Party: TLP (2025-present)
- Other political affiliations: PTI-P (2024-2025); JUI (F) (2018-2023)

Afreen Khan is a Pakistani politician who had been a member of the National Assembly of Pakistan from August 2018 till August 2023.

== Political career ==
He was elected to the National Assembly of Pakistan as a candidate of Muttahida Majlis-e-Amal (MMA) from Constituency NA-11 (Kohistan-cum-Lower Kohistan-cum-Kolai Palas Kohistan) in the 2018 Pakistani general election. He received 15,859 votes and defeated an independent candidate, Dost Muhammad Shakir.

He contested the 2024 Khyber Pakhtunkhwa provincial election as a candidate of Pakistan Tehreek-e-Insaf Parliamentarians (PTI-P) from PK-31 Kohistan Upper, but was unsuccessful. He received 2,349 votes and was defeated by Fazle Haq, an independent candidate.
