= Kabal Tehsil =

Kabal Tehsil تحصیل کبل کبل تحصیل
- Tehsil
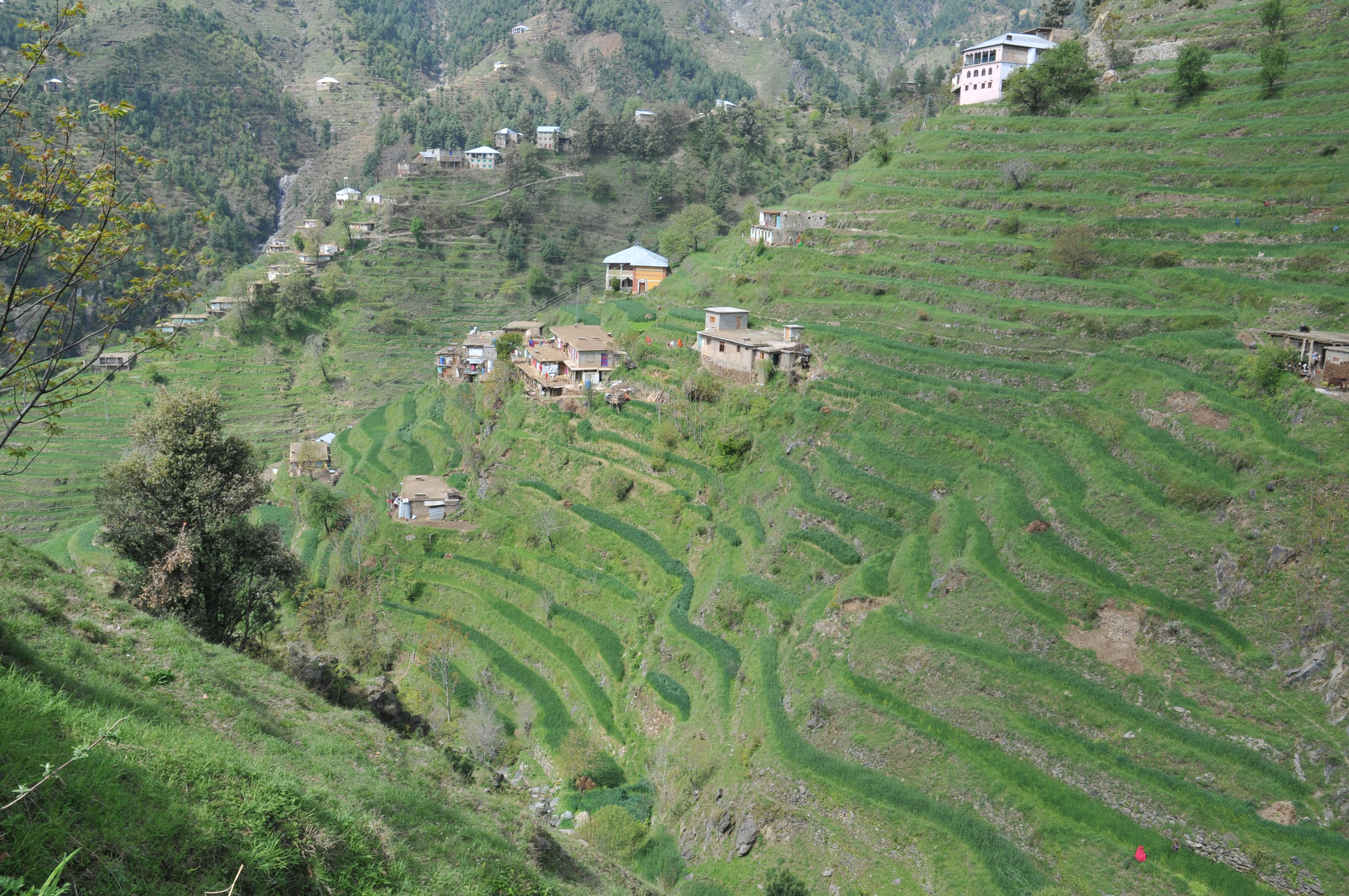

- Location within Khyber Pakhtunkhwa Location within Pakistan
- Coordinates: 34°47′N 72°17′E
- Country: Pakistan
- Province: Khyber Pakhtunkhwa
- District: Swat

Government
  - Tehsil Chairman: Saeed Ahmad Khan (PTI)
  - Suhail Sultan MNA of PTI.: Hameed Ur Rahman Mpa pti

Area
  - Tehsil: 485 km^{2} (187 sq mi)
- Elevation: 845 m (2,772 ft)

Population (2023)
  - Tehsil: 480,827
  - Density: 991/km^{2} (2,570/sq mi)
  - Urban: 132,549 (27.57%)
  - Rural: 348,278 (72.43%)

Literacy (2023)
  - Literacy rate: 49.26%
- Time zone: UTC+5 (PST)

Kabal (Urdu and Pashto: کبل) is a tehsil in Swat District, Khyber-Pakhtunkhwa province of Pakistan. Some villages located in Kabal tehsil are Kabal village,Guljaba, Hazara, Aligrama, Kanju, derai, kuza bandai, Bara bandai, Ningolai, and so on. Famous Football teams are Angar Football Club Guljaba, Kabal 11 football club, Hazara 11, Dilawer Khan Shaheed kuza bandai, Awami derai and Aligrama 11. There’s a mini airport located in swat called saidu sharif airport which hasn’t been in operation for over 2 decades.

== Demographics ==
=== Population ===
Historical population
| Year | Pop. | ±% p.a. |
|---|---|---|
| 1951 | ... | — |
| 1961 | ... | — |
| 1972 | ... | — |
| 1981 | ... | — |
| 1998 | ... | — |
| 2017 | 420,001 | — |
| 2023 | 480,827 | +2.28% |

According to 2023 census, Kabal Tehsil had a population of 480,827. It has literacy rate of 49.26%.
