= 2024 Pakistani general election =

- 8 February 2024

All 336 seats in the National Assembly of Pakistan (Note: 60 seats are reserved for women and 10 for non-Muslims, which are allocated proportionally based on the number of seats held by each party in the National Assembly after the elections.) 169 seats needed for a majority
- Opinion polls
- Registered: 128,585,760
- Turnout: 47.8% (▼3.9pp)
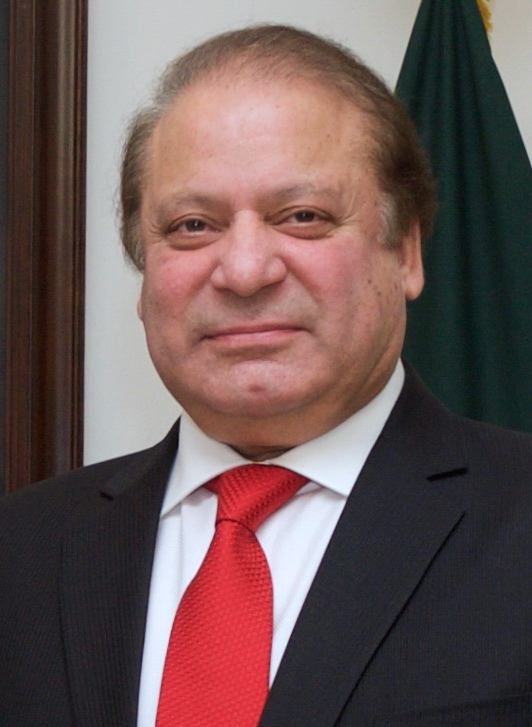

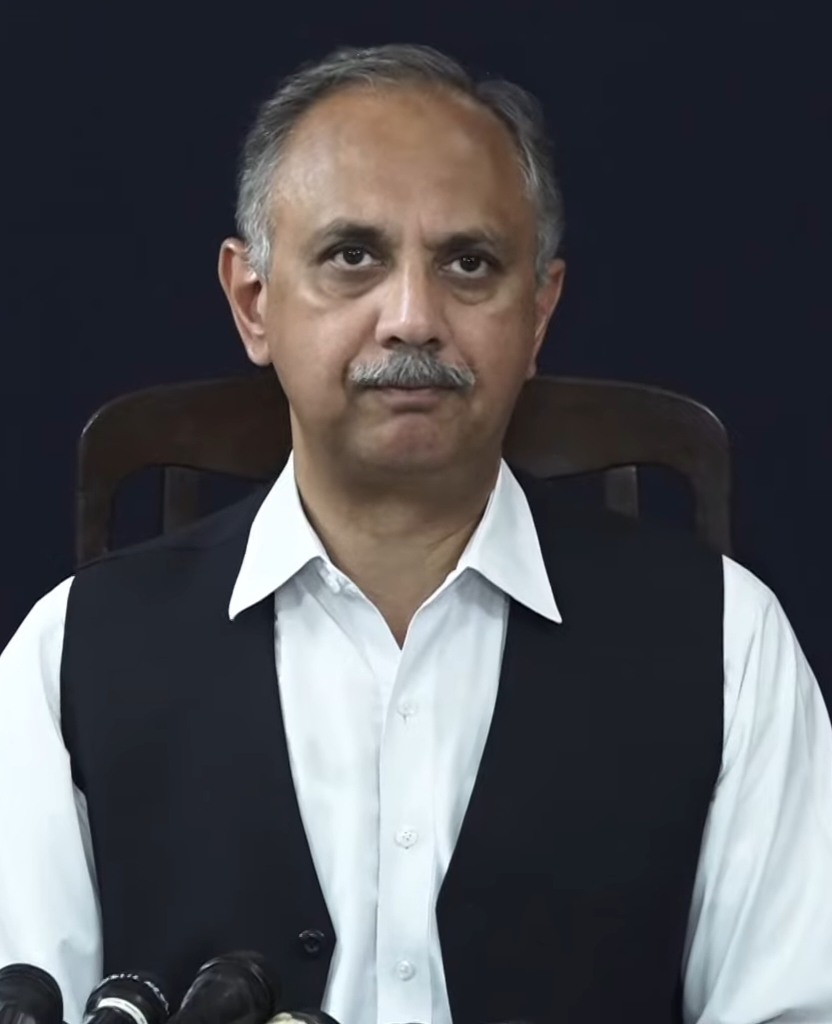

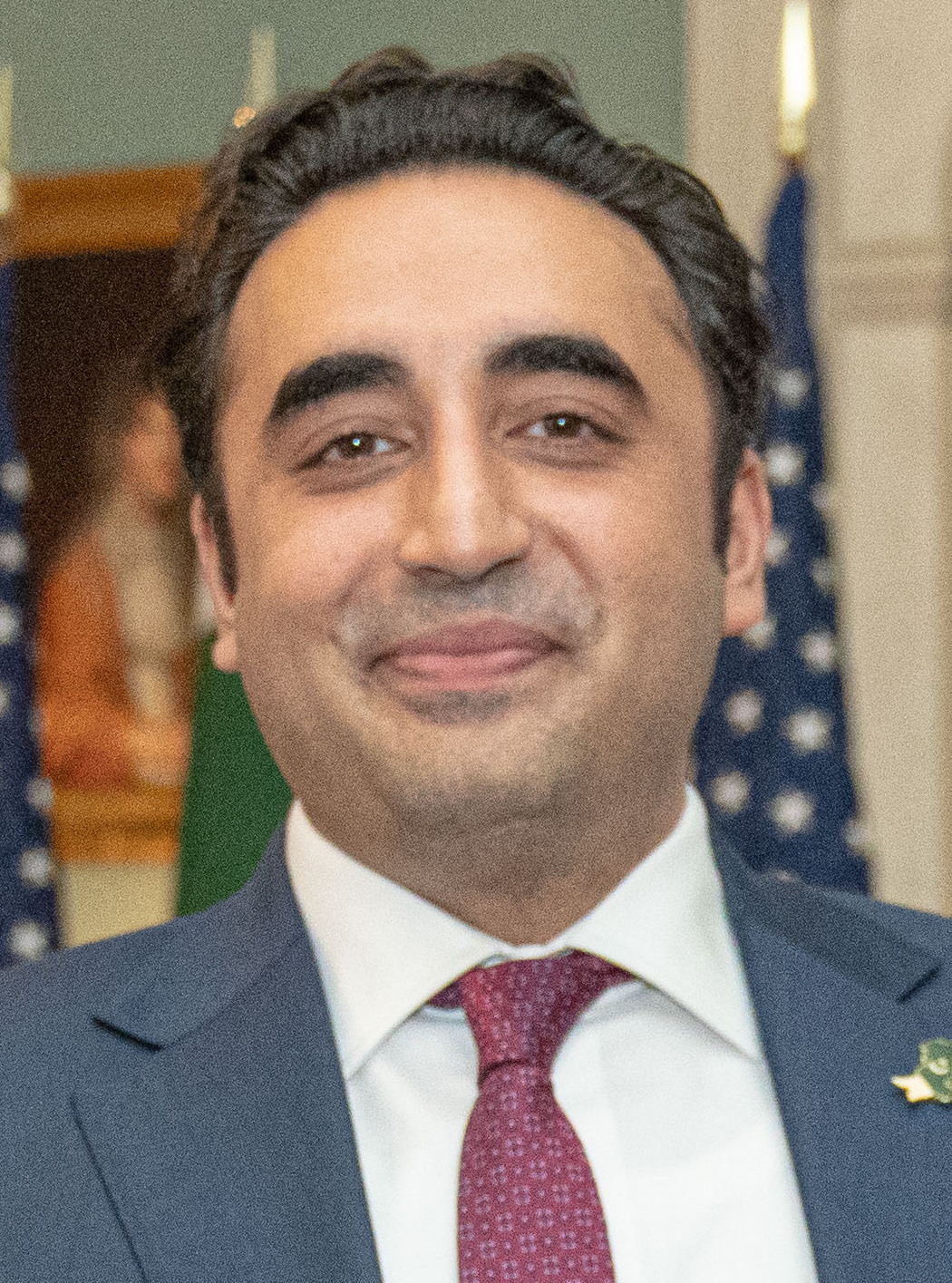
	First party	Second party	Third party
Leader	Nawaz Sharif (Note: Nawaz Sharif led the PML-N election campaign and would have become Prime Minister of Pakistan in the case that they won a majority of seats, with Shehbaz Sharif the candidate otherwise.)	Omar Ayub (Note: Served as candidate for Prime Minister of Pakistan appointed by Imran Khan.)	Bilawal Bhutto Zardari
Party	PML(N)	PTI independents (Note: PTI members who contested in the general election ran as independent candidates aligned with the party because the Election Commission of Pakistan prohibited the PTI election symbol, which the Supreme Court of Pakistan affirmed.)	PPP (Note: Contested as Pakistan Peoples Party Parliamentarians)
Last election	24.35%, 82 seats	31.82%, 149 seats	13.03%, 43 seats
Seats won	98	93 (Note: The Supreme Court of Pakistan officially recognised 39 of these seats as won by PTI ticket holders, with the rest recognised as independent of any party affiliation.)	68
Seat change	▲16	▼56	▲25
Popular vote	13,999,656	18,457,567	8,244,944
Percentage	23.64%	31.17%	13.92%
Swing	▼0.71pp	▼0.65pp	▲0.89pp
- Map of Pakistan with National Assembly constituencies
Caretaker Prime Minister before election
Anwaar ul Haq Kakar
Independent
Subsequent Prime Minister
Shehbaz Sharif
PML(N)

General elections, originally scheduled to be held in 2023, were held in Pakistan on 8 February 2024 to elect the members of the 16th National Assembly. The Election Commission of Pakistan announced the detailed schedule on 15 December 2023.

The elections were held following two years of political unrest after Prime Minister Imran Khan of the Pakistan Tehreek-e-Insaf (PTI) was removed from office by a no-confidence motion. Subsequently, Khan was arrested and convicted for corruption and barred from politics for five years. In the run-up to the elections, a Supreme Court ruling stripped the PTI of their electoral symbol for failing to hold intra-party elections for years.

In the final election results, independent candidates ended up winning 103 general seats including 93 backed by the PTI, followed by 75 from the Pakistan Muslim League (N) (PML-N) and 54 from the Pakistan People's Party (PPP). In Punjab and Sindh provinces, the PML-N and the PPP respectively emerged as the largest parties. Independent candidates backed by the PTI won the most number of seats in Khyber Pakhtunkhwa while Balochistan voted for the PPP and the PML-N as the largest parties. Later all parties except the PTI were given reserved seats for women and minorities.

The military establishment was widely accused of rigging the elections in favour of the PML-N's leader Nawaz Sharif to keep Khan out of the electoral race. Observer groups and members of the international community, including the United States, United Kingdom and the European Union, have voiced their concerns about the fairness of the elections, while media outlets around the world cast widespread doubt on the veracity of the results.

PTI chair Gohar Ali Khan alleged election rigging and claimed that the party had won 180 National Assembly seats as per provisional election results. PTI-backed independent candidates did not secure a majority, but they managed to win more seats than any other single party, despite their leader Imran Khan being in jail. Khan also cited alleged election rigging, and declined to forge alliances with other parties to establish a coalition government and instead opted to assume an opposition role in parliament.

At a press conference on 13 February 2024, it was announced by the leaders of the PML-N and the PPP that they would form a coalition government with the PML-N's Shehbaz Sharif as prime minister. The Muttahida Qaumi Movement – Pakistan (MQM-P), the Pakistan Muslim League (Q) (PML-Q), the Istehkam-e-Pakistan Party (IPP) and the Balochistan Awami Party (BAP) also expressed their intent to join the governmental coalition. On 3 March, Shehbaz Sharif was elected as Prime Minister of Pakistan for the second time, securing 201 votes against the 92 votes received by the PTI-backed Omar Ayub Khan. With no party securing a majority in the assembly, Shehbaz became prime minister with support from the PML-N's allies, including the PPP, MQM-P, PML-Q, BAP, IPP and other smaller parties.

== Background ==
=== 2018 elections ===
General elections were held in Pakistan on 25 July 2018 after the completion of a five-year term by the outgoing government. At the national level, elections were held in 272 constituencies, each electing one member to the National Assembly. At the provincial level, elections were held in each of the four provinces to elect Members of the Provincial Assemblies (MPA).

As a result of the elections, the Pakistan Tehreek-e-Insaf (PTI) became the single largest party at the national level in terms of both popular vote and seats. At the provincial level, the PTI remained the largest party in Khyber Pakhtunkhwa (KP); the Pakistan People's Party (PPP) remained the largest party in Sindh and the newly-formed Balochistan Awami Party (BAP) became the largest party in Balochistan. In Punjab, a hung parliament prevailed with Pakistan Muslim League (N) (PML-N) emerging as the largest party in terms of directly elected seats by a narrow margin. However, following the support of the Pakistan Muslim League (Q) and the joining of independent MPAs into the PTI, the latter became the largest party and was able to form the government.

=== 2022 constitutional crisis ===
On 8 March 2022 the opposition parties, under the banner of the Pakistan Democratic Movement (PDM), submitted a motion of no confidence against Prime Minister Imran Khan to the National Assembly's secretariat. On 27 March 2022, Khan waved a diplomatic cypher from US in the public, claiming that it demanded the removal of Khan's government in a coup. Later he changed his stance about the US conspiracy against his government, in an effort to mend ties with the country. However, in August 2023, The Intercept claimed to have published the contents of the diplomatic cable which had American diplomat Donald Lu on record as stating that "all will be forgiven" concerning the country's neutrality in the Russian invasion of Ukraine, if the no-confidence motion against Khan were to succeed. After the election, JUI-F president Fazal-ur-Rehman, a critic of Imran Khan, claimed that the motion of no-confidence to remove Khan was introduced on the instructions of former army chief General Qamar Javed Bajwa.

On 1 April 2022, Prime Minister Khan announced that in the context of the no-confidence motion against him in the National Assembly, the three options were discussed with "establishment" to choose from viz: "resignation, no-confidence [vote] or elections". On 3 April 2022, President Arif Alvi dissolved the National Assembly of Pakistan on Khan's advice after the Deputy Speaker of the National Assembly rejected and set-aside the motion of no confidence; this move would have required elections to the National Assembly to be held within 90 days. On 10 April, after a Supreme Court ruling that the no-confidence motion was illegally rejected, a no-confidence vote was conducted and he was ousted from office, becoming the first prime minister in Pakistan to be removed from office by a vote of no confidence. Khan claimed the United States was behind his removal because he conducted an independent foreign policy and had friendly relations with China and Russia. His removal led to protests from his supporters across Pakistan.

=== PDM government ===
After the success of the no-confidence motion, on 11 April 2022 Shehbaz Sharif became the Prime Minister after receiving 174 votes out of a total of 342, two more than the required majority with the support of the Pakistan People's Party, Jamiat Ulema-e-Islam and various smaller parties under the coalition of the PDM. Dissident members of PTI also supported his candidature. Meanwhile, the remaining PTI members, who were now in the opposition, boycotted the session terming it a continuation of a "foreign conspiracy". A day later, over 100 PTI members tendered resignations from their National Assembly seats.

The PDM government remained in power until 10 August 2023. Sharif's tenure was marked by historically high inflation, contraction of the national economy, and a record devaluation of the Pakistani rupee.

=== Assassination attempt on Imran Khan and his subsequent arrest ===
Following its ouster from the government, PTI continued to enjoy mass popularity with its supporters taking to the streets across the country. In July 2022, during a provincial by-election in Punjab, the party had a landslide victory after winning 15 of the 20 seats. During October 2022 by-elections conducted for the National Assembly, the party won 7 out of 9 seats with Khan winning 6 of the 7 seats he was contesting for. Later in the year, Khan himself led a well-attended march of protest throughout the populous province of Punjab, to force an early general election. However, on 3 November 2022, while he was leading the march through Wazirabad, he was shot at and injured in an attempted assassination.

As Khan was recovering from the gunshot wounds to his leg, the government registered several cases against him and attempted to arrest him from his home in Zaman Park on two different occasions during March 2023. Each time the police were unable to arrest him as his supporters intervened. Then on 9 May 2023, he was violently arrested by paramilitary forces while marking his attendance at Islamabad High Court in a corruption case. The arrest came a day after the country's army warned him for accusing a high-ranking member of the ISI, Major General Faisal Naseer, of being responsible for the assassination attempt in November 2022. Nationwide violence followed, in what were termed as the May 9 riots, with some demonstrators targeting military installations. Following the events, a crackdown was initiated against the party by the country's military establishment. PTI leaders, party workers, and supporters, as well as those perceived to be allied to the party's cause within the media and legal profession, were targeted. Trials of civilians within military courts were also initiated. Several core leaders of the party have been in hiding since, with many incarcerated or forced to abandon the party. Subsequently, two pro-establishment splinter groups emerged from within the PTI, namely the PTI Parliamentarians (PTI-P), led by Pervez Khattak, and the Istehkam-e-Pakistan Party (IPP), led by Jahangir Tareen.

On 16 February 2024, former Secretary of Defense Naeem Khalid Lodhi claimed that the military establishment had indirectly contacted Imran Khan in which Khan was reportedly asked to admit responsibility and apologize for planning the May 9 riots and assure that such actions would not be repeated in the future. However, according to Lodhi, no resolution came from these interactions.

=== Schedule controversies ===
In January 2023, in a bid to force early general elections, the PTI prematurely dissolved the provincial assemblies it was in power in – namely Punjab and Khyber-Pakhtunkhwa. According to the constitution of Pakistan, after the dissolution of an assembly, elections are supposed to be held there within 90 days, thus, constitutionally limiting the date for the two provincial elections to be no later than April 2023. However, the Election Commission of Pakistan (ECP) delayed the elections to October 2023, citing lack of funds provided by the PDM government and the unavailability of the required security personnel. The PTI approached the Supreme Court of Pakistan against the electoral body's decision, terming it a violation of the constitution, and with a majority verdict the court declared the ECP's earlier ruling as unconstitutional and ordered it to hold elections by 14 May 2023. After the nationwide May 9 riots that broke out following Imran Khan's arrest – the election date passed without the Supreme Court order being enforced. On 30 May, after the passage of a new law, the PDM government filed a review petition against the court's earlier ruling.

On 10 August 2023, the National Assembly was prematurely dissolved by the President Arif Alvi on the advice of Prime Minister Shehbaz Sharif. This meant that the election must be held no later than 8 November 2023. However, on 5 August 2023, the results of the 2023 digital census were approved by the Council of Common Interests headed by Shehbaz Sharif. Therefore, elections were to be delayed to February 2024 at the latest, as announced by the ECP in order to carry out fresh electoral delimitations in light of the approved census results. Despite that, on 13 September 2023, President Alvi proposed 6 November 2023 as a date to the ECP and advised it to seek guidance from the Supreme Court for the announcement of the election date. On 2 November 2023, the ECP and the President agreed on 8 February 2024 as the date for the general election.

=== Return of Nawaz Sharif to electoral politics ===
At the start of May 2023, the PDM government adopted a law allowing for filing review petitions against prior Supreme Court verdicts. At the end of June, another law, limiting disqualification to five years, was adopted. It also allows the electoral commission to announce the date of an election without consulting the President of the country.

After serving 12 months of his 7-year sentence on corruption charges, former prime minister Nawaz Sharif left the country on 19 November 2019 to receive medical treatment in London, promising to return in 4 weeks. He was declared a fugitive in 2021 after failing to appear before courts despite summons. Sharif obtained protective bail on 19 October 2023, which allowed him to return from 4 years of self-imposed exile without being arrested. On October 21, he returned to the country where he was welcomed in Lahore by a gathering of tens of thousands of his supporters.

On 9 January 2024, a seven-member Supreme Court bench under Chief Justice Qazi Faez Isa, hearing a review petition against lifetime disqualification, announced a 6–1 majority verdict with Justice Yahya Afridi dissenting. The verdict set aside the earlier Supreme Court interpretation of lifetime disqualification for article 62(1)(f) of the constitution, stating that it violated fundamental rights, and instead set a five-year disqualification following the newly passed laws for lawmakers who fail the moral standard of "sadiq and ameen" (honest and righteous). The timing of the verdict ensured that Sharif, who was disqualified for life in the Panama Papers case in 2017, was eligible to contest these elections with a possible fourth term as prime minister.

== Campaign ==
=== PTI de facto ban through intra-party election verdict ===
On 22 December 2023, the ECP decided against allowing the PTI to keep its electoral symbol, asserting that the party had failed to conduct intra-party elections to the commission's satisfaction. Subsequently, on the same day, the PTI appealed to the Peshawar High Court (PHC) challenging the ECP's decision. Consequently, a single-member bench suspended the ECP's order until 9 January 2024. On 30 December 2023, the ECP submitted a review application to the PHC. In the following days, a two-member bench lifted the suspension order while hearing the case. However, on 10 January 2024, the two-member bench deemed the ECP's order "illegal, without any lawful authority, and of no legal effect." Responding to this, on 11 January, the ECP contested the ruling in the Supreme Court.

On 13 January, a three-member panel of the Supreme Court, headed by Chief Justice Qazi Faez Isa, sided with the ECP, reinstating their initial decision to deny the PTI its election symbol, the cricket bat, due to the party's failure to conduct intra-party elections by its constitution. Consequently, the PTI was unable to allocate party tickets to any of its candidates, resulting in all party candidates being listed as independent candidates with individual electoral symbols. The party also lost the right to nominate candidates for 226 reserved seats across the central and provincial legislatures. Removing the cricket bat symbol was viewed as preventing voters from recognising the party on ballot papers—a crucial factor in Pakistan where 40 per cent of the population is illiterate.

The Supreme Court's decision led some legal experts to describe the ruling as a "huge blow to fundamental rights" and "a defeat for democratic norms."

=== Imran Khan's convictions ===
In the week before the elections, Imran Khan was sentenced to jail terms in three separate cases. On 30 January 2024, with the government seeking a death penalty, he was sentenced to 10 years in a case dealing with the handling of state secrets by Judge Abul Hasnat Zulqarnain. A day later, Judge Muhammad Bashir, sentenced him and his wife, Bushra Bibi, to a jail term of 14 years, along with a fine of Rs. 787 million (US$2.8 million) each for retaining a jewellery set that was a state gift from Saudi Arabia against an undervalued assessment from the country's Toshakhana. The ruling also barred Khan from holding public office for 10 years. Two days later, Judge Qudratullah declared the marriage of Khan and his wife against Islamic law and sentenced both to prison for a term of seven years for allegedly solemnising their marriage during Bushra's Iddah period. The case was lodged on the complaint of Khawar Maneka, Bushra's former husband, five years after her marriage to Khan.

All three trials were held behind closed doors in Adiala Jail, where Khan has been incarcerated since August 2023 on corruption charges, and were marked with rushed proceedings, sudden replacement of defendant's lawyers with state consuls, and other procedural irregularities that led his party to term the decisions to be coming from "kangaroo courts". Khan's sentencing in the marriage case was decried by lawyers and members of the civil society as an overreach and a blow to women's rights. Meanwhile, some observers termed the sentencings as a continuation of the Pakistani military's engineering to keep Khan out of power in the upcoming elections. On election day, a PTI official said Khan had been allowed to vote in prison using a postal ballot.

=== Allegations of pre-poll rigging ===
Some observers, including the United Nations and Human Rights Watch, have pointed to what appears to be pre-poll rigging in the run-up to the upcoming elections. There have been notable actions against the PTI and its leaders, including snatching of nomination papers, arbitrary arrests of candidates and their supporters, systematic rejection of nomination papers, and disruption of campaign events. This situation has led to widespread allegations of 'election engineering' and manipulative practices that could potentially favour certain political groups, casting doubts over the fairness of the electoral process. Pakistan's electoral commission was also accused of gerrymandering in favour of the PML-N during the redrawing of voter maps before the elections, with a record 1,300 complaints made.

Many candidates affiliated with the PTI complained that following the ban on the usage of the cricket bat as the party's logo for the ballots, the electoral commission provided them with symbols carrying obscure meanings and sometimes awkward connotations such as a calculator, an electric heater, a dice, a bed, an eggplant, which is deemed anatomically suggestive, and a bottle, which carries suggestions of alcohol consumption in the majority-Muslim country. This forces some of them to highlight their assigned symbols to voters, particularly those living in rural areas, on TikTok.

Numerous PTI candidates were reportedly beaten and imprisoned, while many were compelled to join opposing parties or quit politics entirely. A strict order was given to stop mentioning Khan's name on television and PTI protests were suppressed, while PTI supporters were arrested and harassed by the military, judiciary as well other political parties. The majority of the party leadership found themselves imprisoned or exiled, while PTI rallies were subjected to attacks, making campaigning virtually impossible as candidates were forced into hiding. The Intercept reported allegations of military involvement in the killing and torture of PTI supporters, and also noted that Pakistani media was significantly restricted over the past year, making critical reporting on the army and government nearly impossible.

On one occasion, Usman Dar, a former member of Imran Khan's cabinet, announced his resignation from the PTI and also withdrew from the election after police officials assaulted his elderly mother, Rehana Dar, in her own bedroom. Rehana Dar subsequently appeared on TV, announcing her intention to enter the election race and contest against Khawaja Asif. She expressed, "You have achieved what you wanted by making my son [Usman Dar] step down at gunpoint, but my son has quit politics, not me. Now you will face me in politics".

Just 48 hours before the voting, a full-page advertisement declaring Nawaz Sharif as the prime minister was published on the front pages of every newspaper in the country.

==== Appointment of bureaucrats as electoral officers ====
For the first time in Pakistan's electoral history since 1985, Chief Electoral Commissioner Sikandar Sultan Raja employed the services of the highly politicized executive bureaucracy, particularly Assistant Commissioners and Deputy Commissioners, in the key electoral roles of Returning Officers (RO) and District Returning Officers (DRO). These ROs and DROs are engaged in all stages of the electoral process: from screening applicants to consolidation of vote counts, and, finally, provisionally notifying winning candidates. Traditionally, these posts have been occupied by the lower judiciary of the country.

On 14 December 2023, Justice Ali Baqar Najafi of the Lahore High Court suspended the ECP's decision on the petition of the PTI that questioned the apparent bias of the appointed bureaucrats. However, the next day, a three-member bench of the Supreme Court, consisting of Qazi Faez Isa, Mansoor Ali Shah, and Sardar Tariq Masood, set aside this ruling and allowed the DROs and ROs to be notified from the bureaucracy, meanwhile stopping LHC from undertaking further proceedings on the petition citing over-reach of authority.

On 30 December 2023, these ROs rejected a majority of the nomination papers filed by the leadership of the PTI, including those of the party's chief, Imran Khan. The PTI's general secretary, Omar Ayub Khan, termed the rejections as "pre-poll rigging". The party challenged these rejections in the courts. Many of these rejections were later reversed by the courts.

==== Censorship ====
On 26 January 2024, PTI's official website, insaf.pk, and a separate website made for disseminating information regarding the individual electoral symbols of the party's candidates were blocked in Pakistan. A voter helpline created by the party was also blocked. Previously, social media was blocked in the country during the party's virtual electoral events on at least three separate occasions as per internet watchdog, NetBlocks.

Journalists covering the elections reported a 'near-blanket ban' on their ability to cover PTI candidates fairly. News channels allegedly received messages from individuals belonging to Pakistan's military establishment instructing them to remove all references to PTI in their visuals, graphics, and talking points.

==== Election day violence and disruptions ====
Widespread internet disruption, with complete closure of mobile phone networks, was observed and condemned by Amnesty International as a blunt attack on the rights to freedom of expression and peaceful assembly. On 6 March, the Pakistan Telecommunication Authority (PTA) admitted in its response to the Sindh High Court (SHC) that the Ministry of Interior had indeed issued directives to suspend mobile phone services on the election day on 8 February, due to security concerns and fear of terror related activities.

Several polling stations faced instances of violence, ballot box snatching, vandalism and gunfire.

On election day, polling stations were changed randomly, causing confusion and directing voters to incorrect polling locations.

== Electoral system ==
The 336 members of the National Assembly consist of 266 general seats elected by first-past-the-post voting in single-member constituencies, 60 seats that are reserved for women elected by proportional representation based on the number of general seats won by each party in each province, and ten seats that are reserved for non-Muslims elected through proportional representation based on the number of overall general seats won by each party. Independents cannot claim reserved seats.

The government had passed a bill that required the next general elections to be held using EVMs (electronic voting machines). This was aimed at ending the allegations of rigging that have plagued previous elections in Pakistan. Still, the opposition's opinion was that it would make it extremely easy for PTI to rig the elections in their favour through security loopholes.

In 2022 when the PTI-led government was ousted through a successful vote of no-confidence in the National Assembly, the 11 opposition parties, some of them being long-time rivals, formed a new government and passed the Elections Amendment Bill, which nullified the use of EVMs in the next general elections. Hence, EVMs were not used in the current general elections. Instead paper ballots were once again employed during the elections. Furthermore, overseas Pakistanis were also prevented from e-voting in these elections because of this amendment.

=== Voting and transmission of results ===
Registered voters in each polling station of an electoral district get two paper ballots to put a stamp on their preferred candidate for the national and provincial assembly respectively. These ballots are then counted by a presiding officer who then transmits the results for their polling station to the returning officer (RO) in Form 45. Copies of Form 45 are also given to the observing polling agents of the contesting candidates. The RO then consolidates these Form 45s, in front of the contesting candidates of the constituency they are overseeing, to give a provisional result in Form 47 before doing a final consolidation in Form 48. The ECP then uses the data from Forms 47 and 48 to officially notify elected members for each constituency using Form 49, provided that no candidate contested the unofficial consolidated counts given in Form 48.

== Timeline ==
In July 2023 the ECP invited political parties to submit applications for the allocation of electoral symbols, given that about 40% of the Pakistani population is illiterate.

As of 25 July 2023, the total number of registered voters in Pakistan stood around 127 million as compared to 106 million (including 59.22 million men and 46.73 million women voters) in 2018, according to the data released by the ECP. According to the figures, the number of eligible female voters stood at 58.5 million (around 46 per cent of the total registered voters) while the number of eligible male voters was 68.5 million (about 54 per cent of the total voters).

In late September the ECP announced that citizens over 18 can update their voter details until 25 October 2023. The ECP decided to "unfreeze" the electoral rolls to allow registered voters to rectify or update their details.

On 2 November 2023, President Arif Alvi and the ECP agreed on holding general elections on 8 February, after a meeting was held in Aiwan-i-Sadr on the orders of the Supreme Court. The court had instructed the ECP to consult with the President on the poll date.

On 15 December 2023, the ECP issued the election schedule. It set 22 December as the last date for filing nomination papers. On that day however, the ECP extended the deadline for the submission of nomination papers to 24 December. More than 5,000 people were officially recognized as candidates for the 266 directly elected seats in the National Assembly, with only 313 of them being women.

Compared to the 46.89 percent female voter turnout in 2018, the share of female voters share decreased to 41.3 percent in 2024, while the male turnout increased from 56.01 percent to 58.7 percent.

According to data from the ECP, over 17,800 candidates contested the elections for national and provincial assemblies. Among them were 5,160 candidates, including 312 women and two transgender persons, who competed for 266 general seats of the National Assembly. The data revealed that the TLP, which debuted in the 2018 elections nominated more candidates than the country's two major parties — the Pakistan Peoples Party (PPP) and the Pakistan Muslim League-Nawaz (PML-N). The PPP nominated 219 candidates, while the PML-N fielded 212 candidates.

== Parties ==
The table below lists each party that either received a share of the vote higher than 0.5% in the 2018 Pakistan general election or had representation in the 15th National Assembly of Pakistan. Political parties are ordered by their vote share in the 2018 elections. Independent candidates won 13 seats in 2018.

Name		Flag	Claimed ideology(ies)	Leader	Voteshare in 2018	General seats won in 2018	Seats before election
PTI	Pakistan Tehreek-e-Insaf (Note: Contested as independent candidates in all constituencies) پاکستان تحريکِ انصاف		Populism; Islamic democracy Welfarism; Civic nationalism	Imran Khan	31.82%	116 / 272	149 / 342
PML(N)	Pakistan Muslim League (Nawaz) پاکستان مسلم لیگ (نواز)		Conservatism; Economic liberalism Federalism	Nawaz Sharif	24.35%	64 / 272	82 / 342
PPP	Pakistan People's Party پاکستان پیپلز پارٹی		Social democracy Islamic democracy Progressivism; Third Way	Bilawal Bhutto Zardari	13.03%	43 / 272	58 / 342
JUI-F	Jamiat Ulema-e-Islam (Fazl) جمیعت علماءِ اسلام (ف)		Islamism; Conservatism	Fazl-ur-Rahman	4.85%	11 / 272	14 / 342
JI	Jamaat-e-Islami Pakistan جماعت اسلامی پاکستان		Islamism; Islamic revivalism Social conservatism	Siraj-ul-Haq	4.85%	1 / 272	1 / 342
MQM(P)	Muttahida Qaumi Movement – Pakistan متحدہ قومی موومنٹ(پاکستان)		Liberalism; Social liberalism Social democracy Muhajir nationalism Secularism	Khalid Maqbool Siddiqui	1.38%	6 / 272	7 / 342
TLP	Tehreek-e-Labbaik Pakistan تحریک لبیک پاکستان		Islamism Barelvi revival	Saad Hussain Rizvi	4.21%	0 / 272	0 / 342
AML	Awami Muslim League Pakistan عوامی مسلم لیگ پاکستان		Populism	Shaikh Rasheed Ahmad	0.22%	1 / 272	1 / 342
JWP	Jamhoori Wattan Party جمہوری وطن پارٹی		Baloch nationalism	Shahzain Bugti	0.04%	1 / 272	1 / 342
MQM-London	Muttahida Qaumi Movement – London (Note: Ran as Independent candidates under panel name "Wafa Parast Group") متحدہ قومی موومنٹ		Social Liberalism; Secularism; Muhajir Nationalism	Altaf Hussain	0%	0 / 272	0 / 342
MQM-H	Mohajir Qaumi Movement Pakistan مہاجر قومی موومنٹ پاکستان		Liberal Socialism; Secularism; Muhajir Nationalism	Afaq Ahmed	0%	0 / 272	0 / 342
GDA	Grand Democratic Alliance گرینڈ ڈیموکریٹک الائنس		Regionalism; Opposition to the PPP	Pir of Pagaro VIII	2.37%	2 / 272	3 / 342
ANP	Awami National Party عوامی نيشنل پارٹی		Pashtun nationalism Democratic socialism Secularism	Asfandyar Wali Khan	1.54%	1 / 272	1 / 342
MWM	Majlis Wahdat-e-Muslimeen مجلس وحدتِ مسلمین		Islamic Socialism; Shia-Sunni Unity; Islamic Democracy	Allama Raja Nasir Abbas	0%	0 / 272	0 / 342
PML(Q)	Pakistan Muslim League (Quaid e Azam) پاکستان مسلم لیگ(قائد اعظم)		Conservatism; Pakistani nationalism	Shujaat Hussain	0.97%	4 / 272	5 / 342
BAP	Balochistan Awami Party بلوچستان عوامی پارٹی		Federalism; Islamic democracy	Khalid Hussain Magsi	0.60%	4 / 272	5 / 342
BNP(M)	Balochistan National Party (Mengal) بلوچستان نيشنل پارٹی(مینگل)		Baloch nationalism Democratic socialism Secularism	Akhtar Mengal	0.45%	3 / 272	4 / 342
PML(Z)	Pakistan Muslim League (Z) پاکستان مسلم لیگ (ض)		Islamism; Reformism	Ijaz-ul-Haq		0 / 272	0 / 342

== Opinion polls ==
In August 2023, the ECP imposed a total ban on entrance and exit polls including those on official digital media accounts of electronic and print media outlets. Before the ban, opinion polling in June 2023 by Gallup Pakistan, the Institute of Public Opinion Research (IPOR) and IRIS showed that the PML-N had regained its lead over the PTI especially in the country's largest province, Punjab.

Last date of polling	Polling firm	Link	PTI	PML(N)	PPP	MMA (Note: Certain polls only include data for the JUI(F) instead of the MMA. In those cases, data for the JUI(F) is used because the JUI(F) is the largest constituent party of the MMA and makes up most of its base.)	TLP	Other	Ind.	Lead	Margin of error	Sample size	Undecideds & Non-voters (Note: This is a column that lists the percentage of undecided voters and non-voters in certain polls that publish this data. As some polls do not publish any data on undecided voters and non-voters, the columns with survey participants who had a preference when polled are all that is needed to reach 100%. In surveys that do include data on non-voters and undecided voters, a scaling factor is applied to the margin of error and the rest of the data (for example, if the number of undecideds and non-voters equals 20%, each party would have their vote share scaled up by a factor of 100/80 (the formula is 100/(100-UndecidedPercentage)). This is done to keep consistency between the different polls and the types of data they provide.)
30 June 2023	Gallup Pakistan	PDF	42%	20%	12%	4%	4%	5%		22%	±2.5%	3,500	13%
3 June 2022	IPOR (IRI)	PDF	39%	33%	12%	7%	4%	5%		6%	±2 – 3%	2,003	25%
21 March 2022	IPOR (IRI)	PDF	35%	33%	19%	6%	4%	3%		2%	±2 – 3%	3,509	16%
31 January 2022	Gallup Pakistan	PDF	34%	33%	15%	6%	3%	9%		1%	±3 – 5%	5,688	33%
9 January 2022	IPOR (IRI)	PDF	31%	33%	17%	3%	3%	11%	1%	2%	±2 – 3%	3,769	11%
11 November 2020	IPOR (IRI)	PDF	36%	38%	13%	4%	3%	6%		2%	±3.22%	2,003	32%
13 August 2020	IPOR (IRI)	PDF	33%	38%	15%	3%	3%	8%		5%	±2.95%	2,024	26%
30 June 2020	IPOR (IRI)	PDF	24%	27%	11%	3%	2%	33%		3%	±2.38%	1,702	N/A (Note: This poll or crosstabulation did not include any data about undecided voters or non-voters and cut them out completely from the published results.)
24 June 2019	Gallup Pakistan	PDF	31%	28%	15%	5%	21%			3%	±3 – 5%	~1,400	N/A
22 November 2018	IPOR (IRI)	PDF	43%	27%	15%	1%	1%	11%	1%	16%	±2.05%	3,991	22%
25 July 2018	2018 Elections	ECP	31.8%	24.3%	13.0%	4.8%	4.2%	10.3%	11.5%	7.5%	N/A	53,123,733	N/A

== Security concerns and violence ==
The ECP categorised half the country's 90,675 polling stations as either "sensitive", meaning there is a risk of violence, or "most sensitive", indicating a higher risk. The classifications were based on the area's security situation and history of electoral violence. In Balochistan Province alone, caretaker provincial home minister Muhammad Zubair Jamali said that almost 80% of its 5,028 polling stations had been declared "sensitive".

=== Pre-poll violence ===
On 25 January 2024, the Tehrik-i-Taliban Pakistan pledged not to stage attacks on election rallies and would limit itself to attacking military and police targets during the election period. This followed the government's decision to deploy troops in sensitive constituencies after intelligence agencies warned that militants could target rallies.

Two candidates were killed during the election campaign. On 10 January, Malik Kaleem Ullah, an independent candidate for the Provincial Assembly of Khyber Pakhtunkhwa, was shot dead while on a door-to-door sortie, while on 31 January, Rehan Zaib Khan, an independent candidate affiliated with the PTI, was killed after gunmen opened fire on his car in a market in Bajaur, Khyber Pakhtunkhwa, in an attack that also injured three people and was claimed by the Islamic State – Khorasan Province (ISIS-K). On 30 January, four people were killed and five others injured in an explosion during a PTI rally in Sibi, Balochistan Province, while on 31 January, 15 people were injured in attacks on residences and offices of PPP candidates and the election office of the PML-N in Balochistan, which was partially claimed by the Baloch Liberation Army. On 7 February, 29 people were killed in explosions outside an independent candidate's office and an office of the Jamiat Ulema-e-Islam (F) (JUI-F) in Balochistan. Both attacks were claimed by ISIS-K.

=== Incidents on election day ===
The Pakistan Ministry of Foreign Affairs announced the closure of its borders with Iran and Afghanistan on the eve of the general elections on 8 February, as a measure to enhance security.

Ten minutes before polling stations opened, the interior ministry announced the suspension of mobile internet services across the country, citing recent terrorist incidents. NetBlocks director Alp Toker called the outage "amongst the largest" that they had observed. PPP leader Bilawal Bhutto Zardari demanded that the government restore services and said its lawyers would challenge the decision in court. The PTI called the outage a "cowardly act".

In Balochistan, grenades were thrown at two polling stations by unidentified individuals. In Khyber Pakhtunkhwa, a soldier was killed in an attack by gunmen in Kot Azam, while five security personnel were killed in an attack in Kulachi. A polling station in the same province was shelled by mortars. Two security officers were killed and nine wounded by an explosion near a polling station in Lajja, Balochistan, while two people were injured following 14 "minor blasts" in Gwadar.

=== Post-election violence ===
On 9 February, two PTI workers were killed and 24 others were injured after clashes broke out between police and PTI supporters demonstrating against alleged electoral fraud in Shangla District, Khyber Pakhtunkhwa. On 10 February, Mohsin Dawar, the leader of the National Democratic Movement who was running for a national assembly seat in North Waziristan, was seriously injured in a gun attack in Miranshah. On 11 February, six people, including a police officer, were killed and five others were injured in election-related clashes in Larkana. On 12 February, Chaudhry Muhammad Adnan, a former PTI member of the Punjab Assembly and Independent candidate for the NA-57 Rawalpindi-VI and PP-19 Rawalpindi-XIII constituencies in Punjab, was shot dead in Rawalpindi. On 13 February, three people were killed and five others were injured in a gun attack on a PPP victory rally in Dera Ismail Khan. On 14 February, two people were killed and 13 others were injured in clashes between BAP and PPP supporters during a recount outside the office of the returning officer in Hub, Balochistan.

== Results ==
=== National Assembly ===
The election was postponed in the NA-8 Bajaur constituency in Khyber Pakhtunkhwa due to the killing of candidate Rehan Zeb Khan. Provincial assembly elections were also postponed in the constituencies of PK-22 and PK-91 (both in Khyber Pakhtunkhwa) due to the deaths of candidates there.

Vote share of Pakistan Tehreek-e-Insaf

Vote share of Pakistan Muslim League (N)

Vote share of Pakistan Peoples Party

Party	Votes	%	Seats			
Party	Votes	%	General	Women	Minority	Total
Pakistan Tehreek-e-Insaf independents	18,457,567	31.17	93	0	0	93
Pakistan Muslim League (N)	13,999,656	23.64	75	19	4	98
Pakistan People's Party	8,244,944	13.92	54	12	2	68
Tehreek-e-Labbaik Pakistan	2,888,619	4.88	0	0	0	0
Jamiat Ulema-e-Islam (F)	2,163,160	3.65	5	2	0	7
Jamaat-e-Islami Pakistan	1,336,698	2.26	0	0	0	0
Grand Democratic Alliance	1,180,866	1.99	0	0	0	0
Muttahida Qaumi Movement – Pakistan	1,119,962	1.89	18	4	0	22
Istehkam-e-Pakistan Party	648,827	1.10	3	1	0	4
Awami National Party	622,115	1.05	1	0	0	1
Pakistan Muslim League (Q)	339,518	0.57	3	1	0	4
Pakistan Markazi Muslim League	205,768	0.35	0	0	0	0
Pashtunkhwa National Awami Party	166,640	0.28	1	0	0	1
Balochistan National Party (Mengal)	162,988	0.28	1	0	0	1
Pakistan Rah-e-Haq Party	119,864	0.20	0	0	0	0
Pakistan Muslim League (Z)	109,570	0.19	1	0	0	1
Pakistan Tehreek-e-Insaf Parliamentarians	96,089	0.16	0	0	0	0
Balochistan Awami Party	90,985	0.15	1	0	0	1
National Party	68,741	0.12	1	0	0	1
Pashtunkhwa Milli Awami Party	64,544	0.11	1	0	0	1
Majlis Wahdat-e-Muslimeen	61,899	0.10	1	0	0	1
Others	507,571	0.86	0	0	0	0
Independents	6,564,486	11.08	7	0	0	7
Total	59,221,077	100.00	266	39	6	311
Source: ECP, BBC, Tribune Gallup

=== Results by province or territory ===
Province/Territory	Seats									
Province/Territory	Seats	PTI	PML(N)	PPP	MQM-P	JUI-F	PML(Q)	IND	Others	Postponed
Punjab	141	55	71	10	0	0	3	2	0	0
Khyber Pakhtunkhwa	45	37	3	1	0	2	0	0	1	1
Sindh	61	0	0	43	17	0	0	0	0	0
Balochistan	16	1	4	2	0	2	0	1	6	0
Islamabad Capital Territory	3	0	2	0	0	0	0	1	0	0
Total	266	93	78	49	17	6	3	9	9	1

=== Results by constituency ===
Province	District	Constituency		Winner				Runner Up				Margin	Turnout
Province	District	NA No.	Constituency name	Candidate	Party	Votes	%	Candidate	Party	Votes	%	Margin	Turnout
Khyber Pakhtunkhwa	Upper Chitral; Lower Chitral	NA-1	Upper Chitral-cum-Lower Chitral	Abdul Latif	PTI	61,834	38.16	Muhammad Talha Mahmood	JUI(F)	42,987	26.53	18,847	53.19%
Khyber Pakhtunkhwa	Swat	NA-2	Swat-I	Amjad Ali Khan	PTI	88,938	52.22	Amir Muqam	PML(N)	37,764	22.17	51,174	35.11%
Khyber Pakhtunkhwa	Swat	NA-3	Swat-II	Salim Rehman	PTI	81,490	50.15	Wajid Ali Khan	PML(N)	27,941	17.19	53,550	36.20%
Khyber Pakhtunkhwa	Swat	NA-4	Swat-III	Sohail Sultan	PTI	88,085	56.20	Saleem Khan	ANP	20,997	13.40	67,119	30.62%
Khyber Pakhtunkhwa	Upper Dir	NA-5	Upper Dir	Sahibzada Sibghatullah	PTI	91,165	44.28	Sahabzada Tariq Ullah	JI	49,066	23.83	42,619	36.40%
Khyber Pakhtunkhwa	Lower Dir	NA-6	Lower Dir-I	Muhammad Bashir Khan	PTI	81,229	49.14	Siraj-ul-Haq	JI	57,458	34.76	23,714	37.16%
Khyber Pakhtunkhwa	Lower Dir	NA-7	Lower Dir-II	Mehboob Shah	PTI	84,670	49.03	Muhammad Ismail	JI	31,104	18.01	53,710	42.76%
Khyber Pakhtunkhwa	Bajaur	NA-8	Bajaur	Mubarak Zeb Khan	Ind.	74,008	40.60	Gul Zafar Khan	SIC	47,282	25.94	26,726	28.04%
Khyber Pakhtunkhwa	Malakand	NA-9	Malakand	Junaid Akbar	PTI	113,545	57.83	Syed Ahmad Ali Shah	PPP	40,785	20.77	72,773	43.14%
Khyber Pakhtunkhwa	Buner	NA-10	Buner	Gohar Ali Khan	PTI	110,954	54.45	Abdur Rauf	ANP	31,056	15.24	79,721	37.80%
Khyber Pakhtunkhwa	Shangla	NA-11	Shangla	Amir Muqam	PML(N)	61,204	41.08	Said Fareen	PTI	55,312	37.12	5,552	33.26%
Khyber Pakhtunkhwa	Upper Kohistan; Lower Kohistan; Kolai-Palas	NA-12	Kohistan-cum-Lower Kohistan-cum-Kolai Palas Kohistan	Malik Muhammad Idrees	PML(N)	28,010	27.69	Malak Salahuddin Khan	JUI(F)	23,014	22.75	4,540	52.42%
Khyber Pakhtunkhwa	Battagram	NA-13	Battagram	Muhammad Nawaz Khan Allai	PTI	32,647	35.66	Muhanmad Yousuf	JUI(F)	21,542	23.53	10,873	28.88%
Khyber Pakhtunkhwa	Mansehra	NA-14	Mansehra	Sardar Muhammad Yousuf	PML(N)	115,642	45.51	Muhammad Saleem Imran	PTI	103,388	40.69	12,211	44.77%
Khyber Pakhtunkhwa	Mansehra; Torghar	NA-15	Mansehra-cum-Torghar	Shahzada Muhammad Gushtasap Khan	PTI	105,259	44.12	Nawaz Sharif	PML(N)	80,413	33.71	24,867	38.41%
Khyber Pakhtunkhwa	Abbottabad	NA-16	Abbottabad-I	Ali Asghar Khan	PTI	105,300	43.52	Murtaza Javed Abbasi	PML(N)	86,621	35.80	18,717	44.96%
Khyber Pakhtunkhwa	Abbottabad	NA-17	Abbottabad-II	Ali Khan Jadoon	PTI	97,366	56.21	Mahabat Khan	PML(N)	44,760	25.84	52,655	44.51%
Khyber Pakhtunkhwa	Haripur	NA-18	Haripur	Omar Ayub	PTI	194,429	55.39	Babar Nawaz Khan	PML(N)	113,079	32.22	80,559	50.04%
Khyber Pakhtunkhwa	Swabi	NA-19	Swabi-I	Asad Qaiser	PTI	115,719	54.37	Fazal Ali Haqqani	JUI(F)	45,764	21.50	70,068	40.06%
Khyber Pakhtunkhwa	Swabi	NA-20	Swabi-II	Shahram Khan Tarakai	PTI	123,828	57.62	Waris Khan	ANP	48,286	22.47	75,430	39.91%
Khyber Pakhtunkhwa	Mardan	NA-21	Mardan-I	Mujahid Ali	PTI	119,068	51.18	Azam Khan	JUI(F)	52,222	22.45	66,862	45.56%
Khyber Pakhtunkhwa	Mardan	NA-22	Mardan-II	Atif Khan	PTI	115,935	53.83	Haider Khan Hoti	ANP	66,952	31.09	49,127	39.68%
Khyber Pakhtunkhwa	Mardan	NA-23	Mardan-III	Ali Muhammad Khan	PTI	102,188	51.59	Ahmad Khan	ANP	33,922	17.13	68,265	44.35%
Khyber Pakhtunkhwa	Charsadda	NA-24	Charsadda-I	Malik Anwar Taj	PTI	89,841	45.98	Gohar Ali	JUI(F)	48,264	24.93	41,256	39.44%
Khyber Pakhtunkhwa	Charsadda	NA-25	Charsadda-II	Fazal Muhammad Khan	PTI	100,742	45.93	Aimal Wali Khan	ANP	68,019	31.01	32,837	39.97%
Khyber Pakhtunkhwa	Mohmand	NA-26	Mohmand	Sajid Khan Mohmand	PTI	41,502	44.20	Muhammad Arif	JUI(F)	19,985	21.29	21,559	27.30%
Khyber Pakhtunkhwa	Khyber	NA-27	Khyber	Mohammed Iqbal Khan Afridi	PTI	85,647	62.99	Shahjee Gul Afridi	PML(N)	18,979	13.96	66,682	21.98%
Khyber Pakhtunkhwa	Peshawar	NA-28	Peshawar-I	Noor Alam Khan	JUI(F)	138,389	57.39	Sajid Nawaz	PTI	65,119	27.00	73,270	62.06%
Khyber Pakhtunkhwa	Peshawar	NA-29	Peshawar-II	Arbab Amir Ayub	PTI	68,792	56.06	Saqib Ullah Khan	ANP	18,888	15.39	49,904	39.72%
Khyber Pakhtunkhwa	Peshawar	NA-30	Peshawar-III	Shandana Gulzar	PTI	78,971	59.83	Nasir Khan Musazai	JUI(F)	20,950	15.87	58,021	33.80%
Khyber Pakhtunkhwa	Peshawar	NA-31	Peshawar-IV	Sher Ali Arbab	PTI	82,985	58.00	Arbab Alamgir Khan	PPP	22,543	15.76	60,442	36.61%
Khyber Pakhtunkhwa	Peshawar	NA-32	Peshawar-V	Asif Khan	PTI	122,792	55.69	Ghulam Ahmad Bilour	ANP	45,846	20.79	76,946	38.38%
Khyber Pakhtunkhwa	Nowshera	NA-33	Nowshera-I	Syed Shah Ahad Ali Shah	PTI	93,474	47.43	Pervez Khattak	ANP	26,592	13.49	66,856	45.64%
Khyber Pakhtunkhwa	Nowshera	NA-34	Nowshera-II	Zulfiqar Ali	PTI	95,704	45.98	Imran Khattak	Pakistan Tehreek-e-Insaf Parliamentarians	32,732	15.72	62,954	47.14%
Khyber Pakhtunkhwa	Kohat	NA-35	Kohat	Shehryar Afridi	PTI	128,594	52.68	Abbas Khan Afridi	PML(N)	59,034	24.18	71,307	37.50%
Khyber Pakhtunkhwa	Hangu; Orakzai	NA-36	Hangu-cum-Orakzai	Yousuf Khan	PTI	73,347	54.52	Obaidullah	JUI(F)	35,178	26.15	38,752	25.03%
Khyber Pakhtunkhwa	Kurram	NA-37	Kurram	Hameed Hussain	MWM	58,661	38.18	Sajid Hussain Turi	PPP	54,792	35.66	4,266	37.77%
Khyber Pakhtunkhwa	Karak	NA-38	Karak	Shahid Ahmed Khattak	PTI	117,998	54.56	Shah Abdul Aziz	JUI(F)	40,949	18.94	77,091	45.40%
Khyber Pakhtunkhwa	Bannu	NA-39	Bannu	Nasim Ali Shah	PTI	146,667	52.71	Zahid Akram Durrani	JUI(F)	111,293	40.00	36,412	39.46%
Khyber Pakhtunkhwa	North Waziristan	NA-40	North Waziristan	Misbahuddin	JUI(F)	43,400	30.50	Aurang Zeb Khan	PTI	33,799	23.75	9,169	33.52%
Khyber Pakhtunkhwa	Lakki Marwat	NA-41	Lakki Marwat	Sher Afzal Marwat	PTI	117,988	48.76	Asjad Mehmood	JUI(F)	68,303	28.23	49,685	48.10%
Khyber Pakhtunkhwa	Upper South Waziristan; Lower South Waziristan	NA-42	South Waziristan Upper-cum-South Waziristan Lower	Zubair Khan Wazir	PTI	20,240	26.92	Ali Wazir	Ind.	16,302	21.68	3,828	16.68%
Khyber Pakhtunkhwa	Tank; Dera Ismail Khan	NA-43	Tank-cum-Dera Ismail Khan	Dawar Khan Kundi	PTI	64,575	38.70	Asad Mehmood	JUI(F)	64,020	38.36	555	43.85%
Khyber Pakhtunkhwa	Dera Ismail Khan	NA-44	Dera Ismail Khan-I	Ali Amin Gandapur	PTI	92,161	44.17	Fazal-ur-Rehman	JUI(F)	59,585	28.56	33,521	54.97%
Khyber Pakhtunkhwa	Dera Ismail Khan	NA-45	Dera Ismail Khan-II	Fatehullah Khan Miankhel	PPP	56,944	37.41	Obaid Ur Rehman	JUI(F)	48,361	31.77	8,590	50.01%
Islamabad Capital Territory	Islamabad	NA-46	Islamabad-I	Anjum Aqeel Khan	PML(N)	82,536	51.18	Amir Mughal	PTI	46,313	28.72	37,641	46.30%
Islamabad Capital Territory	Islamabad	NA-47	Islamabad-II	Tariq Fazal Chaudhry	PML(N)	101,575	40.32	Shoaib Shaheen	PTI	87,105	34.58	16,106	58.39%
Islamabad Capital Territory	Islamabad	NA-48	Islamabad-III	Khurram Shehzad Nawaz	PML(N)	69,701	38.37	Muhammad Ali Bokhari	PTI	59,865	32.95	9,848	61.11%
Punjab	Attock	NA-49	Attock-I	Sheikh Aftab Ahmed	PML(N)	120,158	37.80	Tahir Sadiq	PTI	110,462	34.75	9,497	50.40%
Punjab	Attock	NA-50	Attock-II	Malik Sohail Khan	PML(N)	118,288	28.47	Eman Waseem	PTI	109,908	26.46	9,886	60.05%
Punjab	Rawalpindi; Murree	NA-51	Murree-cum-Rawalpindi	Raja Usama Sarwar	PML(N)	149,400	42.76	Muhammad Latasob Satti	PTI	113,911	32.60	35,407	52.53%
Punjab	Rawalpindi	NA-52	Rawalpindi-I	Raja Pervaiz Ashraf	PPP	113,015	34.45	Tariq Aziz Bhatti	PTI	91,918	28.02	20,718	50.47%
Punjab	Rawalpindi	NA-53	Rawalpindi-II	Qamar-ul-Islam Raja	PML(N)	72,006	34.64	Ajmal Sabir Raja	PTI	58,480	28.14	13,530	53.07%
Punjab	Rawalpindi	NA-54	Rawalpindi-III	Aqeel Malik	PML(N)	85,930	37.25	Azra Masood	PTI	73,729	31.96	12,218	50.59%
Punjab	Rawalpindi	NA-55	Rawalpindi-IV	Malik Ibrar Ahmed	PML(N)	112,345	47.80	Muhammad Basharat Raja	PTI	96,799	41.18	11,441	55.32%
Punjab	Rawalpindi	NA-56	Rawalpindi-V	Hanif Abbasi	PML(N)	96,655	44.95	Shehryar Riaz	PTI	82,619	38.43	14,036	41.85%
Punjab	Rawalpindi	NA-57	Rawalpindi-VI	Daniyal Chaudhary	PML(N)	83,333	46.47	Seemabia Tahir	PTI	56,803	31.68	26,542	42.26%
Punjab	Chakwal	NA-58	Chakwal	Tahir Iqbal	PML(N)	163,873	45.32	Ayaz Amir	PTI	152,819	42.26	13,437	61.90%
Punjab	Chakwal; Talagang	NA-59	Chakwal-cum-Talagang	Sardar Ghulam Abbas	PML(N)	135,123	40.84	Muhammad Roman Ahmed	PTI	125,632	37.97	11,964	55.73%
Punjab	Jhelum	NA-60	Jhelum-I	Bilal Azhar Kayani	PML(N)	99,973	43.09	Hassan Adeel	PTI	90,579	39.04	9,474	44.11%
Punjab	Jhelum	NA-61	Jhelum-II	Chaudhry Farrukh Altaf	PML(N)	88,100	37.24	Shaukat Iqbal Mirza	PTI	84,636	35.78	4,023	47.57%
Punjab	Gujrat	NA-62	Gujrat-I	Muhammad Ilyas Chaudhary	PTI	97,436	42.58	Chaudhry Abid Raza	PML(N)	71,154	31.10	26,282	43.97%
Punjab	Gujrat	NA-63	Gujrat-II	Chaudhry Hussain Elahi	PML(Q)	87,567	33.02	Sajid Yousaf	PTI	82,176	30.98	6,429	51.35%
Punjab	Gujrat	NA-64	Gujrat-III	Chaudhry Salik Hussain	PML(Q)	100,379	44.92	Qaisara Elahi	PTI	89,795	40.18	24,259	41.14%
Punjab	Gujrat	NA-65	Gujrat-IV	Chaudhary Naseer Ahmed Abbas	PML(N)	90,772	32.60	Syed Wajahat Hussnain Shah	PTI	82,351	29.58	8,571	49.04%
Punjab	Wazirabad	NA-66	Wazirabad	Muhammad Ahmed Chattha	PTI	160,850	52.81	Nisar Ahmed Cheema	PML(N)	100,684	33.06	60,043	48.51%
Punjab	Hafizabad	NA-67	Hafizabad	Aneeqa Mehdi	PTI	211,044	47.02	Saira Afzal Tarar	PML(N)	183,947	40.98	25,923	57.02%
Punjab	Mandi Bahauddin	NA-68	Mandi Bahauddin-I	Imtiaz Ahmed Chaudhary	PTI	166,229	55.81	Mushahid Raza	PML(N)	71,008	23.84	95,167	50.08%
Punjab	Mandi Bahauddin	NA-69	Mandi Bahauddin-II	Nasir Iqbal Bosal	PML(N)	113,506	39.46	Kausar Parveen Bhatti	PTI	108,900	37.86	4,517	49.72%
Punjab	Sialkot	NA-70	Sialkot-I	Armaghan Subhani	PML(N)	123,495	43.28	Hafiz Hamid Raza	PTI	112,145	39.30	11,320	52.62%
Punjab	Sialkot	NA-71	Sialkot-II	Khawaja Asif	PML(N)	119,017	48.47	Rehana Imtiaz Dar	PTI	100,563	40.95	18,519	43.69%
Punjab	Sialkot	NA-72	Sialkot-III	Ali Zahid	PML(N)	109,507	37.70	Chaudhry Amjad Ali Bajwa	PTI	103,640	35.68	7,130	49.84%
Punjab	Sialkot	NA-73	Sialkot-IV	Syeda Nosheen Iftikhar	PML(N)	112,178	44.18	Ali Asjad Malhi	PTI	104,190	41.94	8,076	48.45%
Punjab	Sialkot	NA-74	Sialkot-V	Muhammad Aslam Ghumman	PTI	130,606	48.79	Rana Shamim Ahmed Khan	PML(N)	96,018	35.87	34,516	50.68%
Punjab	Narowal	NA-75	Narowal-I	Anwaarul Haq Chaudhary	PML(N)	100,116	31.79	Tahir Ali Javed	PTI	75,626	24.02	23,999	51.64%
Punjab	Narowal	NA-76	Narowal-II	Ahsan Iqbal	PML(N)	137,042	45.54	Javaid Safdar Kahlon	PTI	110,278	36.64	26,970	50.69%
Punjab	Gujranwala	NA-77	Gujranwala-I	Chaudhry Mehmood Bashir	PML(N)	109,704	44.82	Rashida Tariq	PTI	91,825	37.51	14,639	52.20%
Punjab	Gujranwala	NA-78	Gujranwala-II	Chaudhary Mubeen Arif Jutt	PTI	106,504	45.56	Khurram Dastgir	PML(N)	89,478	38.27	17,018	41.85%
Punjab	Gujranwala	NA-79	Gujranwala-III	Chaudhary Zulfiqar Bhindar	PTI	95,604	34.53	Chaudhary Ahsaanullah Virk	PML(N)	92,581	33.44	4,388	50.19%
Punjab	Gujranwala	NA-80	Gujranwala-IV	Shahid Usman Ibrahim	PML(N)	98,206	41.92	Lala Asad Ullah	PTI	94,895	40.51	3,153	39.84%
Punjab	Gujranwala	NA-81	Gujranwala-V	Azhar Qayyum	PTI	110,057	43.01	Chaudhry Bilal Ijaz	PML(N)	106,860	41.76	7,791	52.02%
Punjab	Sargodha	NA-82	Sargodha-I	Mukhtar Ahmad Bharath	PML(N)	108,954	38.25	Nadeem Afzal Chan	PPP	87,458	30.70	21,365	52.16%
Punjab	Sargodha	NA-83	Sargodha-II	Usama Ghias Mela	PTI	136,604	50.95	Mohsin Shahnawaz Ranjha	PML(N)	98,700	36.81	37,866	52.57%
Punjab	Sargodha	NA-84	Sargodha-III	Malik Shafqat Abbas Awan	PTI	101,949	43.11	Liaquat Ali Khan	PML(N)	77,478	32.77	24,467	45.74%
Punjab	Sargodha	NA-85	Sargodha-IV	Zulfiqar Ali Bhatti	PML(N)	121,015	44.63	Khuda Dad	PTI	111,165	41.00	9,866	54.76%
Punjab	Sargodha	NA-86	Sargodha-V	Miqdad Ali Khan Baloch	PTI	105,882	40.59	Syed Javed Hasnain Shah	PML(N)	94,487	36.22	11,389	50.84%
Punjab	Khushab	NA-87	Khushab-I	Malik Shakir Bashir Awan	PML(N)	117,775	43.40	Umer Aslam Awan	PTI	108,314	39.91	9,465	55.76%
Punjab	Khushab	NA-88	Khushab-II	Gul Asghar Khan	IPP	82,577	30.19	Muhammad Moazzam Sher	Ind.	64,156	23.46	18,421	62.47%
Punjab	Mianwali	NA-89	Mianwali-I	Jamal Ahsan Khan	PTI	217,427	72.38	Obaidullah Shadikhel	PML(N)	34,068	11.34	183,359	93.19%
Punjab	Mianwali	NA-90	Mianwali-II	Umair Khan Niazi	PTI	179,956	63.18	Humair Hayat Khan Rokhri	PML(N)	51,266	18.00	128,597	58.25%
Punjab	Bhakkar	NA-91	Bhakkar-I	Sanaullah Khan Mastikhel	PTI	106,153	34.52	Abdul Majeed Khan	PML(N)	85,532	27.82	20,574	63.02%
Punjab	Bhakkar	NA-92	Bhakkar-II	Rashid Akbar Khan Nawani	PML(N)	143,604	41.12	Muhammad Afzal Khan Dhandla	IPP	131,789	37.74	11,585	67.69%
Punjab	Chiniot	NA-93	Chiniot-I	Ghulam Muhammad Lali	PTI	94,406	41.26	Ghulam Abbas	Ind.	59,909	26.18	34,454	54.46%
Punjab	Chiniot	NA-94	Chiniot-II	Qaiser Ahmed Sheikh	PML(N)	79,623	32.02	Muhammad Khalid	PTI	72,476	29.14	7,272	57.31%
Punjab	Faisalabad	NA-95	Faisalabad-I	Ali Afzal Sahi	PTI	144,229	52.00	Azad Ali Tabassum	PML(N)	93,586	33.74	50,823	55.22%
Punjab	Faisalabad	NA-96	Faisalabad-II	Rai Haider Ali Khan	PTI	134,724	48.99	Malik Nawab Sher Waseer	PML(N)	92,554	33.66	41,981	49.94%
Punjab	Faisalabad	NA-97	Faisalabad-III	Saadullah Khan Baloch	PTI	72,846	30.02	Ali Gohar Khan	PML(N)	70,532	29.07	2,303	51.21%
Punjab	Faisalabad	NA-98	Faisalabad-IV	Chaudhry Shehbaz Babar	PML(N)	119,599	41.81	Hafiz Mumtaz Ahmed	PTI	105,653	36.93	14,009	50.87%
Punjab	Faisalabad	NA-99	Faisalabad-V	Malik Umar Farooq Mushtaq	PTI	120,797	48.39	Muhammad Qasim Farooq	PML(N)	80,401	32.21	40,309	52.76%
Punjab	Faisalabad	NA-100	Faisalabad-VI	Nisar Ahmad Jutt	PTI	131,980	47.98	Rana Sanaullah	PML(N)	112,651	40.95	19,302	55.27%
Punjab	Faisalabad	NA-101	Faisalabad-VII	Rana Atif	PTI	134,886	52.06	Irfan Ahmed	PML(N)	89,612	34.59	45,269	49.68%
Punjab	Faisalabad	NA-102	Faisalabad-VIII	Changaiz Ahmed Khan Kakar	PTI	132,553	51.04	Abid Sher Ali	PML(N)	100,328	38.63	32,206	48.88%
Punjab	Faisalabad	NA-103	Faisalabad-IX	Muhammad Ali Sarfraz	PTI	147,987	56.78	Akram Ansari	PML(N)	86,683	33.26	61,072	48.53%
Punjab	Faisalabad	NA-104	Faisalabad-X	Sahibzada Hamid Raza	SIC	132,655	51.41	Daniyal Ahmed	PML(N)	92,610	35.89	36,093	49.63%
Punjab	Toba Tek Singh	NA-105	Toba Tek Singh-I	Usama Hamza	PTI	138,494	48.51	Chaudhary Khalid Javed	PML(N)	108,003	37.83	30,354	56.73%
Punjab	Toba Tek Singh	NA-106	Toba Tek Singh-II	Muhammad Junaid Anwar Chaudhry	PML(N)	137,779	44.92	Khalid Nawaz	PTI	137,105	44.70	705	56.80%
Punjab	Toba Tek Singh	NA-107	Toba Tek Singh-III	Riaz Fatyana	PTI	129,971	45.27	Asad Ur Rehman	PML(N)	96,083	33.47	33,295	58.49%
Punjab	Jhang	NA-108	Jhang-I	Sahabzada Mehboob Sultan	PTI	169,676	50.65	Faisal Saleh Hayat	PML(N)	134,369	40.11	35,308	59.36%
Punjab	Jhang	NA-109	Jhang-II	Sheikh Waqas Akram	PTI	176,699	58.98	Muhammad Yaqub Sheikh	PML(N)	61,803	20.63	114,799	52.05%
Punjab	Jhang	NA-110	Jhang-III	Muhammad Ameer Sultan	PTI	199,853	58.81	Muhammad Asif Muavia Sial	PML(N)	104,422	30.73	95,419	60.68%
Punjab	Nankana Sahib	NA-111	Nankana Sahib-I	Arshad Sahi	PTI	113,711	45.83	Barjees Tahir	PML(N)	93,467	37.67	20,242	52.89%
Punjab	Nankana Sahib	NA-112	Nankana Sahib-II	Shezra Mansab Ali Khan	PML(N)	105,656	43.22	Ijaz Ahmed Shah	PTI	93,329	38.18	12,330	54.45%
Punjab	Sheikhupura	NA-113	Sheikhupura-I	Rana Ahmed Ateeq Anwar	PML(N)	119,407	46.10	Rahat Amanullah	PTI	90,872	35.09	28,535	49.88%
Punjab	Sheikhupura	NA-114	Sheikhupura-II	Rana Tanveer Hussain	PML(N)	101,111	44.23	Arshad Mehmood Chaudhry	PTI	82,026	35.88	18,013	51.92%
Punjab	Sheikhupura	NA-115	Sheikhupura-III	Khurram Shahzad Virk	PTI	130,416	48.53	Mian Javed Latif	PML(N)	94,161	35.04	36,111	50.37%
Punjab	Sheikhupura	NA-116	Sheikhupura-IV	Syed Zaheer Ul Hassan Bukhari	PTI	135,062	45.97	Irfan Dogar	PML(N)	89,944	30.62	45,118	51.60%
Punjab	Lahore	NA-117	Lahore-I	Aleem Khan	IPP	91,490	40.05	Ali Ijaz	PTI	80,854	35.40	10,651	44.97%
Punjab	Lahore	NA-118	Lahore-II	Hamza Shahbaz	PML(N)	105,948	41.01	Aliya Hamza Malik	PTI	100,984	39.08	5,157	35.87%
Punjab	Lahore	NA-119	Lahore-III	Maryam Nawaz	PML(N)	83,856	42.59	Shahzad Farooq	PTI	68,384	34.73	15,479	38.59%
Punjab	Lahore	NA-120	Lahore-IV	Ayaz Sadiq	PML(N)	68,037	42.58	Usman Hamza	PTI	49,309	30.86	18,921	44.95%
Punjab	Lahore	NA-121	Lahore-V	Waseem Qadir	PML(N)	78,707	42.76	Shaikh Rohale Asghar	PML(N)	70,598	38.35	8,106	40.08%
Punjab	Lahore	NA-122	Lahore-VI	Latif Khosa	PTI	117,124	51.51	Khawaja Saad Rafique	PML(N)	77,913	34.27	39,400	40.55%
Punjab	Lahore	NA-123	Lahore-VII	Shehbaz Sharif	PML(N)	63,953	41.09	Afzal Azeem Pahat	PTI	48,489	31.15	15,467	47.08%
Punjab	Lahore	NA-124	Lahore-VIII	Rana Mubashir Iqbal	PML(N)	55,391	44.31	Zameer Ahmad	PTI	43,603	34.88	11,793	41.22%
Punjab	Lahore	NA-125	Lahore-IX	Afzal Khokhar	PML(N)	65,102	40.68	Javaid Umar	PTI	51,144	31.96	13,958	48.12%
Punjab	Lahore	NA-126	Lahore-X	Malik Saif ul Malook Khokhar	PML(N)	67,121	44.36	Malik Touqeer Abbas Khokhar	PTI	60,506	39.99	6,638	44.01%
Punjab	Lahore	NA-127	Lahore-XI	Attaullah Tarar	PML(N)	98,214	45.22	Malik Zaheer Abbas	PTI	82,282	37.89	15,980	41.68%
Punjab	Lahore	NA-128	Lahore-XII	Aun Chaudhry	IPP	172,578	45.77	Salman Akram Raja	PTI	159,026	42.18	13,552	56.27%
Punjab	Lahore	NA-129	Lahore-XIII	Mian Muhammad Azhar	PTI	103,739	49.49	Muhammad Numan	PML(N)	71,546	34.13	32,178	40.36%
Punjab	Lahore	NA-130	Lahore-XIV	Mian Muhammad Nawaz Sharif	PML(N)	179310	59	Yasmin Rashid	PTI	104485	34	74,825	52.45%
Punjab	Kasur	NA-131	Kasur-I	Saad Waseem Akhtar Sheikh	PML(N)	110,556	37.54	Muhammad Maqsood Sabir Ansari	PTI	79,545	27.01	30,748	53.46%
Punjab	Kasur	NA-132	Kasur-II	Shehbaz Sharif	PML(N)	137,234	46.08	Sardar Muhammad Hussain Dogar	PTI	111,128	37.32	26,115	57.76%
Punjab	Kasur	NA-133	Kasur-III	Azeemuddin Zahid Lakhvi	PTI	130,167	41.17	Rana Muhammad Ishaq	PML(N)	119,343	37.75	10,757	56.99%
Punjab	Kasur	NA-134	Kasur-IV	Rana Muhammad Hayat	PML(N)	142,322	46.10	Sidra Faisal	PTI	76,887	24.90	65,636	55.85%
Punjab	Okara	NA-135	Okara-I	Chaudhry Nadeem Abbas	PML(N)	129,281	44.14	Malik Muhammad Akram Bhatti	PTI	106,755	36.45	22,518	57.66%
Punjab	Okara	NA-136	Okara-II	Riaz-ul-Haq	PML(N)	127,806	49.52	Rao Hasan Sikandar	PTI	80,191	31.07	47,695	52.15%
Punjab	Okara	NA-137	Okara-III	Syed Raza Ali Gillani	PTI	132,067	46.89	Rao Muhammad Ajmal Khan	PML(N)	105,470	37.45	26,544	54.80%
Punjab	Okara	NA-138	Okara-IV	Muhammad Moeen Wattoo	PML(N)	122,775	43.46	Manzoor Wattoo	PPP	79,731	28.22	42,986	55.69%
Punjab	Pakpattan	NA-139	Pakpattan-I	Ahmad Raza Maneka	PML(N)	121,870	38.54	Rao Omar Hashim Khan	PTI	116,746	36.92	4,890	54.12%
Punjab	Pakpattan	NA-140	Pakpattan-II	Rana Iradat Sharif Khan	PML(N)	139,434	43.11	Raja Talia Saeed	PTI	104,915	32.44	34,560	55.78%
Punjab	Sahiwal	NA-141	Sahiwal-I	Syed Imran Ahmed Shah	PML(N)	118,242	41.76	Rana Amir Shahzad Tahir	PTI	107,060	37.81	11,184	49.83%
Punjab	Sahiwal	NA-142	Sahiwal-II	Chaudhary Usman Ali	PTI	107,498	35.56	Chaudhary Muhammad Ashraf	PML(N)	96,126	31.80	11,371	53.74%
Punjab	Sahiwal	NA-143	Sahiwal-III	Rai Hassan Nawaz	PTI	147,887	45.84	Chaudhry Muhammad Tufail	Ind.	83,806	25.98	63,667	56.20%
Punjab	Khanewal	NA-144	Khanewal-I	Raza Hayat Hiraj	PML(N)	119,133	44.83	Syed Abid Hussain Imam	Ind.	78,384	29.50	40,703	59.04%
Punjab	Khanewal	NA-145	Khanewal-II	Muhammad Khan Daha	PML(N)	102,952	42.52	Abid Mahmood	PTI	56,217	23.22	46,723	53.59%
Punjab	Khanewal	NA-146	Khanewal-III	Zahoor Hussain Qureshi	PTI	112,777	41.28	Aslam Bodla	PML(N)	104,875	38.39	7,927	53.91%
Punjab	Khanewal	NA-147	Khanewal-IV	Chaudhry Iftikhar Nazir	PML(N)	107,933	38.63	Naveed Hameed	PTI	83,813	30.00	24,314	57.01%
Punjab	Multan	NA-148	Multan-I	Yusuf Raza Gilani	PPP	68,110	31.09	Malik Taimur Altaf Mahay	PTI	67,969	31.02	293	53.10%
Punjab	Multan	NA-149	Multan-II	Malik Aamir Dogar	PTI	143,692	61.58	Jahangir Tareen	IPP	50,175	21.50	93,447	43.78%
Punjab	Multan	NA-150	Multan-III	Zain Qureshi	PTI	126,775	51.00	Javed Akhtar Ansari	PML(N)	76,760	30.88	50,012	43.31%
Punjab	Multan	NA-151	Multan-IV	Meher Bano Qureshi	PPP	79,080	33.24	Ali Musa Gilani	PTI	71,649	30.12	7,431	53.62%
Punjab	Multan	NA-152	Multan-V	Abdul Qadir Gillani	PPP	96,998	36.74	Syed Javed Ali Shah	PML(N)	71,259	26.99	25,739	51.41%
Punjab	Multan	NA-153	Multan-VI	Rana Muhammad Qasim Noon	PML(N)	95,202	34.91	Syed Ashiq Hussain Bukhari	Ind.	49,104	18.01	46,107	52.08%
Punjab	Lodhran	NA-154	Lodhran-I	Rana Muhammad Faraz Noon	PTI	134,937	43.65	Abdul Rehman Khan Kanju|	PML(N)	128,438	41.55	6,499	57.69%
Punjab	Lodhran	NA-155	Lodhran-II	Siddique Khan Baloch	PML(N)	117,687	40.89	Jahangir Tareen	IPP	71,131	24.71	46,543	53.08%
Punjab	Vehari	NA-156	Vehari-I	Ayesha Nazir Jutt	PTI	119,758	46.97	Chaudhry Nazeer Ahmad	PML(N)	90,065	35.33	29,467	53.48%
Punjab	Vehari	NA-157	Vehari-II	Syed Sajid Mehdi	PML(N)	99,615	40.14	Sabeen Safdar	PTI	80,187	32.31	19,336	55.17%
Punjab	Vehari	NA-158	Vehari-III	Tehmina Daultana	PML(N)	111,219	42.46	Tahir Iqbal Chaudhry	PTI	103,137	39.38	8,144	54.83%
Punjab	Vehari	NA-159	Vehari-IV	Aurangzeb Khan Khichi	PTI	116,302	44.01	Saeed Ahmed Khan	PML(N)	96,637	36.57	20,007	54.98%
Punjab	Bahawalnagar	NA-160	Bahawalnagar-I	Saad Hussain Rizvi	PML(N)	118,116	45.16	Syed Muhammad Asghar Shah	PTI	110,294	42.17	7,822	61.00%
Punjab	Bahawalnagar	NA-161	Bahawalnagar-II	Alam Dad Lalika	PML(N)	100,679	41.51	Shahid Amin	PTI	81,772	33.71	18,994	54.13%
Punjab	Bahawalnagar	NA-162	Bahawalnagar-III	Ehsan Ul Haq Bajwa	PML(N)	114,379	42.75	Khalil Ahmed	PTI	97,980	36.62	16,413	55.96%
Punjab	Bahawalnagar	NA-163	Bahawalnagar-IV	Ijaz-ul-Haq	Pakistan Muslim League (Z)	84,343	30.71	Shaukat Basra	PTI	75,198	27.38	9,197	57.30%
Punjab	Bahawalpur	NA-164	Bahawalpur-I	Riaz Hussain Pirzada	PML(N)	123,377	44.65	Malik Ejaz Ahmad Gaddan	PTI	117,176	42.40	6,220	57.79%
Punjab	Bahawalpur	NA-165	Bahawalpur-II	Tariq Bashir Cheema	PML(Q)	116,571	38.93	Saud Majeed	Ind.	105,758	35.32	11,241	63.75%
Punjab	Bahawalpur	NA-166	Bahawalpur-III	Makhdoom Syed Sami Ul Hassan Gillani	PML(N)	62,157	29.21	Prince Bahawal Abbas Abbasi	Ind.	48,606	22.84	13,549	50.35%
Punjab	Bahawalpur	NA-167	Bahawalpur-IV	Usman Awaisi	PML(N)	88,670	37.96	Aamir Yar Malik	Ind.	64,037	27.42	24,833	52.14%
Punjab	Bahawalpur	NA-168	Bahawalpur-V	Malik Muhammad Iqbal Channar	PML(N)	122,302	59.30	Sami Ullah Chaudhary	PTI	50,360	24.42	72,259	46.74%
Punjab	Rahim Yar Khan	NA-169	Rahim Yar Khan-I	Makhdoom Syed Murtaza Mehmood	PPP	81,187	31.81	Syed Mobeen Ahmed	PML(N)	73,533	28.81	7,109	50.21%
Punjab	Rahim Yar Khan	NA-170	Rahim Yar Khan-II	Mian Ghous Muhammad	PTI	113,336	46.37	Sheikh Fayyaz Ud Din	PML(N)	79,144	32.38	35,069	49.06%
Punjab	Rahim Yar Khan	NA-171	Rahim Yar Khan-III	Mumtaz Mustafa	PTI	103,834	43.96	Hashim Jawan Bakht	IPP	56,028	23.72	47,804	47.23%
Punjab	Rahim Yar Khan	NA-172	Rahim Yar Khan-IV	Javed Iqbal Warraich	PTI	129,727	51.11	Mian Imtiaz Ahmed	PML(N)	84,893	33.45	44,780	50.52%
Punjab	Rahim Yar Khan	NA-173	Rahim Yar Khan-V	Makhdoom Syed Mustafa Mehmood	PPP	83,120	35.10	Muhammad Nabeel Dahir	PTI	80,304	33.91	2,816	50.46%
Punjab	Rahim Yar Khan	NA-174	Rahim Yar Khan-VI	Azhar Laghari	PML(N)	78,680	30.84	Syed Usman Mehmood	PPP	71,559	28.05	7,121	52.07%
Punjab	Muzaffargarh	NA-175	Muzaffargarh-I	Jamshed Dasti	PTI	113,391	42.47	Mehr Irshad Ahmed Sial	PPP	72,058	26.99	41,256	60.13%
Punjab	Muzaffargarh	NA-176	Muzaffargarh-II	Iftikhar Ahmed Khan Babar	PPP	53,944	23.64	Syed Basit Sultan Bukhari	PML(N)	43,711	19.15	10,155	53.30%
Punjab	Muzaffargarh	NA-177	Muzaffargarh-III	Moazam Ali Khan Jatoi	PTI	113,892	50.93	Syeda Shehr Bano Bukhari	PML(N)	67,964	30.39	45,928	53.72%
Punjab	Muzaffargarh	NA-178	Muzaffargarh-IV	Sardar Aamir Talal Khan Gopang	PML(N)	114,678	50.94	Abdul Qayyum Khan Jatoi	PTI	88,404	39.27	25,884	54.38%
Punjab	Kot Addu	NA-179	Kot Addu-I	Shabbir Ali Qureshi	PTI	104,329	48.46	Malik Ghulam Qasim Hanjra	PML(N)	83,581	38.82	16,076	57.46%
Punjab	Kot Addu	NA-180	Kot Addu-II	Mian Fayyaz Hussain Chhajrra	PTI	96,275	48.42	Raza Rabbani Khar	PPP	49,515	24.90	46,759	51.93%
Punjab	Layyah	NA-181	Layyah-I	Anbar Majeed Khan Niazi	PTI	120,544	36.70	Faiz Ul Hassan	PML(N)	95,109	28.95	25,418	59.28%
Punjab	Layyah	NA-182	Layyah-II	Malik Awais Jakhar	PTI	141,973	44.26	Syed Muhammad Saqlain Shah Bukhari	PML(N)	118,686	37.00	23,215	60.24%
Punjab	Taunsa	NA-183	Taunsa	Khawaja Sheraz Mehmood	PTI	134,501	51.23	Amjad Farooq Khan	PML(N)	88,489	33.70	46,845	57.40%
Punjab	Dera Ghazi Khan	NA-184	Dera Ghazi Khan-I	Abdul Qadir Khan Khosa	PML(N)	111,296	45.11	Ali Muhammad	PTI	109,856	44.53	1,203	56.36%
Punjab	Dera Ghazi Khan	NA-185	Dera Ghazi Khan-II	Zartaj Gul	PTI	94,927	51.41	Mehmood Qadir Khan	Ind.	39,235	21.25	61,952	49.62%
Punjab	Dera Ghazi Khan	NA-186	Dera Ghazi Khan-III	Awais Leghari	PML(N)	100,252	47.18	Sajjad Hussain	PTI	97,990	46.12	1,921	56.04%
Punjab	Rajanpur	NA-187	Rajanpur-I	Ammar Ahmed Khan Laghari	PML(N)	79,811	42.43	Muhammad Atif Ali Drishak	PTI	67,321	35.79	11,255	49.53%
Punjab	Rajanpur	NA-188	Rajanpur-II	Hafeez-ur-Rehman Dreshak	PML(N)	85,979	47.29	Ahmad Ali Khan Dreshak	PTI	70,262	38.65	15,630	50.53%
Punjab	Rajanpur	NA-189	Rajanpur-III	Shamsher Ali Mazari	PML(N)	83,628	45.01	Sardar Riaz Mehmood Khan Mazari	PML(N)	73,394	39.50	10,490	52.10%
Sindh	Jacobabad	NA-190	Jacobabad	Aijaz Hussain Jakhrani	PPP	126,411	63.44	Muhammad Mian Soomro	Ind.	61,555	30.89	66,158	42.65%
Sindh	Jacobabad; Kashmore	NA-191	Jacobabad-cum-Kashmore	Ali Jan Mazari	PPP	103,548	48.16	Shazane Khan	JUI(F)	101,874	47.38	3,310	46.22%
Sindh	Jacobabad; Kashmore; Shikarpur	NA-192	Kashmore-cum-Shikarpur	Mir Shabbir Bijarani	PPP	124,979	58.96	Muhammad Ibrahim Jatoi	JUI(F)	76,970	36.31	48,333	54.99%
Sindh	Shikarpur	NA-193	Shikarpur	Muhammad Shaharyar Khan Mahar	PPP	138,634	64.05	Rashid Mahmood Soomro	JUI(F)	59,519	27.50	74,929	44.48%
Sindh	Larkana	NA-194	Larkana-I	Bilawal Bhutto Zardari	PPP	136,167	74.85	Rashid Mahmood Soomro	JUI(F)	35,526	19.53	99,801	43.10%
Sindh	Larkana	NA-195	Larkana-II	Nazeer Ahmed Baghio	PPP	133,830	70.72	Safdar Ali Abbasi	GDA	48,893	25.84	84,937	45.92%
Sindh	Qambar Shahdadkot	NA-196	Qambar Shahdadkot-I	Bilawal Bhutto Zardari	PPP	85,370	63.06	Nasir Mehmood	JUI(F)	34,499	25.48	50,871	34.89%
Sindh	Qambar Shahdadkot	NA-197	Qambar Shahdadkot-II	Mir Aamir Ali Khan Magsi	PPP	88,130	70.58	Muhammad Uzair Jagirani	JUI(F)	24,199	19.38	63,931	32.86%
Sindh	Ghotki	NA-198	Ghotki-I	Khalid Ahmed Khan Lund	PPP	120,259	51.10	Abdul Haque Alias Mian Mitha	PTI	90,629	38.51	29,630	55.16%
Sindh	Ghotki	NA-199	Ghotki-II	Ali Gohar Khan Mahar	PPP	154,832	75.25	Abdul Qayoom	JUI(F)	40,204	19.54	114,628	46.92%
Sindh	Sukkur	NA-200	Sukkur-I	Nauman Islam Shaikh	PPP	98,244	56.58	Deedar Ali	GDA	41,970	24.17	55,177	39.44%
Sindh	Sukkur	NA-201	Sukkur-II	Khurshid Shah	PPP	121,556	66.83	Muhammad Saleh Indhar	JUI(F)	53,625	29.48	66,917	50.42%
Sindh	Khairpur	NA-202	Khairpur-I	Nafisa Shah	PPP	152,511	77.02	Ghous Ali Shah	GDA	30,026	15.16	117,470	45.62%
Sindh	Khairpur	NA-203	Khairpur-II	Fazal Ali Shah	PPP	128,830	54.89	Pir Sadaruddin Shah	GDA	98,236	41.85	30,594	57.05%
Sindh	Khairpur	NA-204	Khairpur-III	Syed Javed Ali Shah Jillani	PPP	113,022	54.49	Moazzam Ali Khan	GDA	87,501	42.18	24,748	43.52%
Sindh	Naushahro Feroze	NA-205	Naushahro Feroze-I	Sayed Abrar Ali Shah	PPP	126,056	57.73	Asghar Ali Shah	PML(N)	55,001	25.19	68,271	46.34%
Sindh	Naushahro Feroze	NA-206	Naushahro Feroze-II	Zulfiqar Ali Behan	PPP	135,864	60.90	Ghulam Murtaza Jatoi	GDA	77,202	34.60	58,039	49.75%
Sindh	Nawabshah	NA-207	Nawabshah-I	Asif Ali Zardari	PPP	147,465	68.52	Sardar Sher Muhammad Rind Baloch	PTI	51,925	24.13	95,073	44.64%
Sindh	Nawabshah	NA-208	Nawabshah-II	Syed Ghulam Mustafa Shah	PPP	127,181	61.37	Syed Zainulabdin	GDA	59,402	28.67	66,780	51.00%
Sindh	Sanghar	NA-209	Sanghar-I	Shazia Marri	PPP	156,723	51.22	Muhammad Khan Junejo	GDA	140,370	45.88	16,398	52.33%
Sindh	Sanghar	NA-210	Sanghar-II	Salahuddin Junejo	PPP	150,196	54.60	Saira Bano	GDA	108,194	39.33	42,001	47.11%
Sindh	Mirpur Khas	NA-211	Mirpur Khas-I	Aftab Hussain Shah Jillani	PPP	84,512	46.48	Syed Ali Nawaz Shah Rizvi	Ind.	53,881	29.64	30,632	43.86%
Sindh	Mirpur Khas	NA-212	Mirpur Khas-II	Mir Munawar Ali Talpur	PPP	122,291	62.11	Syed Ali Nawaz Shah Rizvi	Ind.	45,359	23.04	76,651	47.37%
Sindh	Umerkot	NA-213	Umerkot	Nawab Yousuf Talpur	PPP	179,188	62.82	Mir Amanullah Khan Talpur	PML(N)	44,961	15.76	130,315	51.39%
Sindh	Tharparkar	NA-214	Tharparkar-I	Pir Ameer Ali Shah Jeelani	PPP	132,365	61.72	Abdul Razzaque Rahimoon	GDA	60,829	28.36	69,747	71.93%
Sindh	Tharparkar	NA-215	Tharparkar-II	Mahesh Kumar Malani	PPP	135,287	50.07	Arbab Ghulam Rahim	GDA	114,329	42.31	18,715	67.96%
Sindh	Matiari	NA-216	Matiari	Makhdoom Jamiluzaman	PPP	124,536	57.57	Bashir Ahmed	PML(N)	80,439	37.19	44,097	53.83%
Sindh	Tando Allahyar	NA-217	Tando Allahyar	Zulfiqar Sattar Bachani	PPP	119,530	57.32	Rahila Magsi	GDA	73,778	35.38	45,752	47.77%
Sindh	Hyderabad	NA-218	Hyderabad-I	Syed Hussain Tariq	PPP	108,598	81.41	Muhammad Rizwan	GDA	7,942	5.95	100,655	40.84%
Sindh	Hyderabad	NA-219	Hyderabad-II	Abdul Aleem Khanzada	MQM-P	55,050	37.93	Mustansir Billah	PTI	38,316	26.40	16,735	34.91%
Sindh	Hyderabad	NA-220	Hyderabad-III	Syed Waseem Hussain	MQM-P	64,531	36.81	Faisal Mughal	PTI	52,025	29.67	12,506	38.60%
Sindh	Tando Muhammad Khan	NA-221	Tando Muhammad Khan	Naveed Qamar	PPP	111,738	68.58	Muhammad Irfan	PTI	23,840	14.63	87,082	48.28%
Sindh	Badin	NA-222	Badin-I	Mir Ghulam Ali Talpur	PPP	113,989	57.04	Mir Hussain Bux Talpur	GDA	67,011	33.53	46,906	44.88%
Sindh	Badin	NA-223	Badin-II	Rasool Bakhsh Chandio	PPP	115,299	52.28	Muhammad Hassam Mirza	GDA	78,711	35.69	36,529	49.54%
Sindh	Sujawal	NA-224	Sujawal	Syed Ayaz Ali Shah Sheerazi	PPP	134,056	72.05	Molvi Muhammad Saleh Alhadad	JUI(F)	15,314	8.23	118,692	46.94%
Sindh	Thatta	NA-225	Thatta	Sadiq Ali Memon	PPP	140,773	75.40	Rasool Bux Jakhro	PML(N)	28,899	15.48	111,874	37.33%
Sindh	Jamshoro	NA-226	Jamshoro	Malik Asad Sikandar	PPP	165,044	74.23	Syed Munir Hyder Shah	GDA	30,876	13.89	134,168	48.42%
Sindh	Dadu	NA-227	Dadu-I	Irfan Ali Leghari	PPP	104,141	50.74	Liaquat Ali Jatoi	GDA	94,877	46.23	10,057	44.70%
Sindh	Dadu	NA-228	Dadu-II	Rafiq Ahmed Jamali	PPP	98,873	58.25	Karim Ali Jatoi	GDA	49,302	29.05	49,348	39.53%
Sindh	Malir	NA-229	Karachi Malir-I	Jam Abdul Karim Bijar	PPP	55,730	53.74	Qadir Bux	PML(N)	21,841	21.06	33,891	45.62%
Sindh	Malir	NA-230	Karachi Malir-II	Syed Rafiullah	PPP	32,099	32.25	Masroor Ali	PTI	23,370	23.48	8,729	40.88%
Sindh	Malir	NA-231	Karachi Malir-III	Abdul Hakeem Baloch	PPP	43,634	33.54	Khalid Mehmood Ali	PTI	43,245	33.24	389	38.71%
Sindh	Korangi	NA-232	Karachi Korangi-I	Aasia Ishaque	MQM-P	84,592	33.56	Adeel Ahmed	PTI	66,753	26.48	17,839	43.06%
Sindh	Korangi	NA-233	Karachi Korangi-II	Muhammad Javed Hanif Khan	MQM-P	103,967	42.20	Muhammad Haris	PTI	58,753	23.85	45,214	46.82%
Sindh	Korangi	NA-234	Karachi Korangi-III	Muhammad Moin Aamir Pirzada	MQM-P	72,009	41.60	Faheem Khan	PTI	44,487	25.70	29,913	45.40%
Sindh	Karachi East	NA-235	Karachi East-I	Muhammad Iqbal Khan	MQM-P	20,185	30.01	Saifur Rehman Khan	PTI	14,167	21.06	6,018	40.51%
Sindh	Karachi East	NA-236	Karachi East-II	Hassaan Sabir	MQM-P	38,871	28.76	Muhammad Muzammil Qureshi	PPP	32,231	23.85	6,640	24.93%
Sindh	Karachi East	NA-237	Karachi East-III	Asad Alam Niazi	PPP	40,840	28.22	Zahoor Uddin	PTI	33,322	23.03	7,515	35.66%
Sindh	Karachi East	NA-238	Karachi East-IV	Sadiq Iftikhar	MQM-P	54,885	32.67	Haleem Adil Sheikh	PTI	36,885	21.95	18,009	30.49%
Sindh	Karachi South	NA-239	Karachi South-I	Nabil Gabol	PPP	40,027	30.98	Muhammad Yasir	PTI	37,285	28.85	2,843	31.22%
Sindh	Karachi South	NA-240	Karachi South-II	Arshad Abdullah Vohra	MQM-P	30,573	26.59	Ramzan Ghanchi	PTI	27,318	23.76	3,255	30.22%
Sindh	Karachi South	NA-241	Karachi South-III	Mirza Ikhtiar Baig	PPP	52,456	47.58	Khurrum Sher Zaman	PTI	48,610	44.10	3,846	23.83%
Sindh	Keamari	NA-242	Karachi Keamari-I	Syed Mustafa Kamal	MQM-P	71,527	37.89	Dawa Khan	PTI	53,770	28.47	18,008	43.69%
Sindh	Keamari	NA-243	Karachi Keamari-II	Abdul Qadir Patel	PPP	60,266	36.08	Shujaat Ali	PTI	48,690	29.15	11,576	37.49%
Sindh	Karachi West	NA-244	Karachi West-I	Farooq Sattar	MQM-P	20,048	33.76	Aftab Jehangir	PTI	14,073	23.70	5,975	38.95%
Sindh	Karachi West	NA-245	Karachi West-II	Syed Hafeezuddin	MQM-P	57,356	36.05	Attaullah Niazi	PTI	36,788	23.12	20,568	43.23%
Sindh	Karachi West	NA-246	Karachi West-III	Syed Aminul Haque	MQM-P	74,177	40.37	Hafiz Naeem ur Rehman	JI	32,011	17.42	42,340	44.00%
Sindh	Karachi Central	NA-247	Karachi Central-I	Khawaja Izharul Hassan	MQM-P	65,050	34.69	Syed Abbas Husnain	PTI	52,058	27.85	12,992	43.51%
Sindh	Karachi Central	NA-248	Karachi Central-II	Khalid Maqbool Siddiqui	MQM-P	103,082	38.87	Arslan Khalid	PTI	86,342	32.56	16,740	44.36%
Sindh	Karachi Central	NA-249	Karachi Central-III	Ahmed Salim Siddiqui	MQM-P	77,529	38.68	Uzair Ali Khan	PTI	51,152	25.52	26,377	36.63%
Sindh	Karachi Central	NA-250	Karachi Central-IV	Farhan Chishti	MQM-P	79,925	42.43	Hafiz Naeem ur Rehman	JI	43,659	23.18	36,266	34.51%
Balochistan	Killa Saifullah; Zhob; Sherani	NA-251	Sherani-cum-Zhob-cum-Killa Saifullah	Syed Samiullah	JUI(F)	46,210	32.90	Khushal Khan Kakar	PNAP	46,117	32.83	93	45.77%
Balochistan	Musakhel; Barkhan; Loralai; Duki	NA-252	Musakhel-cum-Barkhan-cum-Loralai-cum-Duki	Sardar Yaqoob Nasar	PML(N)	55,003	28.45	Sardar Babar Khan Musakhel	PTI	53,125	27.48	791	57.39%
Balochistan	Ziarat; Harnai; Sibbi; Kohlu; Dera Bugti	NA-253	Ziarat-cum-Harnai-cum-Sibbi-cum-Kohlu-cum-Dera Bugti	Mian Khan Mondrani	PML(N)	54,506	23.29	Mir Dostain Khan Domki	PML(N)	45,532	19.45	7,041	53.35%
Balochistan	Kachhi; Jhal Magsi; Nasirabad	NA-254	Nasirabad-cum-Kachhi-cum-Jhal Magsi	Khalid Hussain Magsi	BAP	79,304	54.72	Nizam Ud Din Lehri	JUI(F)	44,814	30.92	34,541	47.02%
Balochistan	Sohbatpur; Jafarabad; Usta Muhammad; Nasirabad	NA-255	Sohbat Pur-cum-Jaffarabad-cum-Usta Muhammad-cum-Nasirabad	Mir Khan Muhammad Jamali	PML(N)	45,404	24.85	Mir Changez Khan Jamali	PPP	39,398	21.56	5,943	37.40%
Balochistan	Khuzdar	NA-256	Khuzdar	Akhtar Mengal	BNP(M)	65,952	48.26	Abdul Rehman	PPP	29,074	21.28	36,747	48.46%
Balochistan	Hub; Lasbela; Awaran	NA-257	Hub-cum-Lasbela-cum-Awaran	Jam Kamal Khan	PML(N)	78,649	43.97	Mohammad Aslam Bhutani	Ind.	59,350	33.18	18,573	51.57%
Balochistan	Panjgur; Kech	NA-258	Panjgur-cum-Kech	Waja Pullain Baloch	NP	22,318	37.47	Noor Ahmed Adil	BNP(A)	13,798	23.17	8,499	27.04%
Balochistan	Kech; Gwadar	NA-259	Kech-cum-Gwadar	Malik Shah Gorgaij	PPP	40,778	35.90	Abdul Malik Baloch	NP	22,313	19.65	18,480	38.20%
Balochistan	Chagai; Nushki; Kharan; Washuk	NA-260	Chagai-cum-Nushki-cum-Kharan-cum-Washuk	Usman Badini	JUI(F)	42,800	25.15	Sardar Fateh Muhammad Muhammad Hassani	PML(N)	35,629	20.94	7,045	48.56%
Balochistan	Kalat; Surab; Mastung	NA-261	Surab-cum-Kalat-cum-Mastung	Abdul Ghafoor Haideri	BNP(M)	31,713	27.89	Akhtar Mengal	JUI(F)	27,465	24.15	1,643	39.05%
Balochistan	Quetta	NA-262	Quetta-I	Adil Khan Bazai	PTI	20,278	25.98	Malik Sikandar Khan	JUI(F)	12,887	16.51	7,400	33.21%
Balochistan	Quetta	NA-263	Quetta-II	Jamal Shah Kakar	PML(N)	27,175	23.48	Salar Khan Kakar	PTI	25,372	21.91	1,802	28.35%
Balochistan	Quetta	NA-264	Quetta-III	Jamal Raisani	PPP	14,977	24.90	Akhtar Mengal	BNP(M)	10,057	16.72	749	31.10%
Balochistan	Pishin	NA-265	Pishin	Fazal-ur-Rehman	JUI(F)	52,436	42.16	Khushal Khan Kakar	PNAP	31,438	25.28	20,993	40.91%
Balochistan	Killa Abdullah; Chaman	NA-266	Killa Abdullah-cum-Chaman	Mahmood Khan Achakzai	PkMAP	67,530	33.34	Maulana Salahuddin Ayyubi	JUI(F)	58,590	28.92	8,589	56.81%

=== Allegations of rigging ===
The election saw delays in the reporting of results across thousands of polling stations, sparking controversy. Initial reports suggested PTI-backed candidates were leading, but the Election Commission of Pakistan (ECP) refuted these claims. Instances of alleged tampering emerged, including significant discrepancies in vote counts and unexpected shifts in results. PTI officials accused the ECP of manipulation and initiated legal challenges. Concerns grew as delays persisted, with accusations of internet shutdowns aimed at impeding opposition efforts. PTI leaders contested official results, claiming widespread irregularities and fabrications, prompting legal action and calls for resignations within the ECP. Revelations of electoral fraud surfaced, including admissions from officials implicated in rigging. Despite retractions, doubts lingered, leading to urgent calls for investigations by election monitoring groups like the Free and Fair Election Network (FAFEN). The Pakistan Institute of Legislative Development and Transparency (PILDAT) underscored declining fairness in its independent evaluation of the election, advocating for a thorough investigation by the ECP to address systemic issues.

On 17 February, Rawalpindi Division commissioner Liaquat Ali Chattha resigned from his post after admitting his role in electoral fraud in the locality where 11 out of a total of 13 national assembly seats were won by PML-N candidates. He claimed his office helped candidates, who were trailing in the actual vote counts by approximately 70,000 votes per candidate, to secure victory using fake stamps. He implicated Chief Electoral Commissioner Sikandar Sultan Raja and Chief Justice Qazi Faez Isa in the scheme. The ECP denied the allegations, saying that divisional commissioners had no direct role in the electoral process, and said it would launch an inquiry. Isa rejected the commissioner's allegation, calling them "baseless". The PTI also called for an investigation. Following his announcement, Chattha surrendered to police, who sealed off his office as part of an investigation. In addition to the PTI, PML-N senator also demanded the resignation of Sikandar Sultan Raja over the rigging allegations.

Following Chattha's statement, X (formerly Twitter) was subsequently blocked in Pakistan, without explanation. President Alvi commented that the blocking of social media websites in Pakistan reflected a lack of intellectual capacity to manage criticism. The government initially dismissed reports of Twitter being blocked, but a document presented to the court on 20 March revealed that the Ministry of Interior and intelligence agencies had ordered the suspension of the website on 17 February, following a statement of Chattha's alleging election rigging. After more than a month, the government acknowledged on 20 March that Twitter was blocked in Pakistan.

On 22 February however, Chattha retracted his claims of election rigging and apologised to the ECP, saying that the PTI offered a strong position for making the allegations. He also said that his mention of the Chief Justice of Pakistan was "taken to create mistrust in general public" against Qazi Faiz Isa.

=== Disinformation ===
Rumors spread on social media claiming that international media outlets had reported the PTI winning over 150 seats. However, a fact-check conducted by iVerify found no evidence to support these claims.

The official Twitter account of Imran Khan, the de facto leader of the PTI, was involved in disseminating false information by sharing a fabricated video purportedly showing post-election rigging.

=== Exit polling ===
According to Gallup Pakistan's exit poll survey, bachelor and master's degree holders were more likely to support the PTI.

=== International analysis ===
Media outlets around the world denounced the election as "fraudulent" with western media characterized the election as already decided, favoring the military-backed candidate Nawaz Sharif.

The New York Times wrote the election results had caught many off guard, as the PML-N was widely anticipated to secure a landslide victory with the backing of the military. The report noted that voters expressed frustration with the military's interference in politics and opted to vote for PTI candidates in defiance of the military generals. It went on to say the election results had humiliated the military establishment and started a new political crisis in the country. Another article by the same newspaper said that the growing public discontent with military interference in politics is likely to pressure Pakistan's army chief General Asim Munir, with his only options being to reconcile with Imran Khan or push forward with an anti-Khan coalition, which many analysts believe would be weak and unsustainable.

The Washington Post in its editorial board wrote following the election outcome, the military's control is being questioned more than ever before, possibly in decades as for the first time, the military-preferred candidate, Nawaz Sharif, was unable to win the most seats. In a separate piece, it wrote that the youth of Pakistan caused the most significant election upset in the country's recent history saying that the youth is increasingly discontented with economic uncertainty and blame corruption and political dynasties. This dissatisfaction is now being expressed more openly on social media, potentially straining the relationship between civilian leaders and the military which will have long-lasting effects. It also wrote that the election results were a humiliation for Sharif, despite being seen as the favoured candidate of the Pakistani military, which had held significant influence in determining the prime minister.

France 24 called the election "The 'generals' elections' which turned against the military". It also dubbed the election as the "most rigged" in the country's history saying the military was seen as backing Nawaz Sharif. According to Time, the Pakistani military did everything to "sideline Imran Khan—and failed," but said that the military was continuing to try and prevent the PTI from returning to power calling the election result as an embarrassment for Sharif.

Ryan Grim in an article published by The Intercept wrote the Inter-Services Intelligence (ISI), was poised to manipulate the election outcome to ensure Nawaz Sharif's victory. However, they were overwhelmed by the unexpected surge of PTI support. In a different piece, Grim wrote that the historic turnout in Pakistan was swamping the military's effort to rig the election and that the military has proved unable to suppress the populist movement interrogating its authority. The Economist called the election "botched", but wrote that the military favours the "shabby" result, fearing that it would lose its economic benefits shout it give up power. It also suggested that the despite their efforts, the military leadership did not seem to have as much control as they believed to prevent Khan from winning. It also said the election outcome was a strong message to the military and could potentially mark a shift in its influence over Pakistani politics, while adding that a prolonged period of political instability could occur in the short-term. It called the electoral process "dubious" which was preceded by a coordinated campaign by the military against Imran Khan.

The Guardian noted that suspicions of military rigging arose during election day due to a nationwide mobile phone blackout and the slow counting of results, leading to concerns that the military was exerting influence to secure the PML-N's success. It added that the military's attempts to influence the election appeared to have been thwarted, particularly due to the PTI's effective utilization of social media, given the significant levels of illiteracy in the country. In a separate article, The Guardian noted analysts' views that the election results and potential weak coalition government align with the military's interests, protecting their political and business agendas.

The Financial Times in its editorial called the election results "flawed" and "shocking", at the same time describing it as a rejection of military influence. Pakistani columnist Khurram Husain was quoted in a separate piece in the newspaper as saying that Pakistan will experience not only the influence of the military but also a collaborative endeavour involving the judiciary and major political parties to thwart the PTI from assuming power.

The New York Post, referencing the New York Times article, stated that this election marks the initial instance in Pakistan's history where a party has achieved such success without the support of the military and this will spark a new political chaos in the country. According to the Canadian Broadcasting Corporation the election results did not unfold as per the military's expectations and had shaken the elite. Hasan Askari Rizvi was quoted as saying, "This is a negative vote for the policies that the military was pursuing.".

Sameer Arshad Khatlani in an opinion piece for the Dhaka Tribune wrote "Election results seem to be blowing up in the military establishment's face which attempted to make Imran Khan irrelevant by jailing him, cracking down PTI". Lipika Pelham wrote for the BBC saying despite PTI-backed independents winning the majority of seats in parliament, they were unlikely to be permitted to form a government.

During an interview with The Wire, Najam Sethi remarked that Imran Khan and the PTI had strongly resisted the influence of the military, which led to the latter resorting to last-minute rigging efforts. Firstpost wrote that the Pakistani military had experienced a setback, at least temporarily, with public sentiment turning against it. It also noted that allegations of electoral fraud by the military put Western countries in a difficult position, given their historic support of the military to ensure the security of the country's nuclear arsenal. It added that "General Asim Munir's tenure may be remembered as one of the darkest for the army, with its reputation suffering greatly under his leadership." It also raised concern over Munir's post-election speech, describing it as uncommon. The Times of India also described Munir as the primary loser of the election. The Indian Express wrote that the unexpected success of the PTI forced the military to manipulate results to avoid an unfavourable outcome. Consequently, there were delays in announcing results, and internet and mobile services were suspended in numerous regions. Meanwhile, Pakistani social media platforms were flooded with videos depicting alleged rigging and manipulation. The Deccan Herald wrote that although the election results represented a significant setback for the military, and would potentially undermine General Munir's position, but it was unlikely that the military will relinquish its influential role in determining the next prime minister.

According to Al Jazeera, numerous analysts suggest that Sharif's return to electoral politics was made possible due to the military's decision to support him in the election. However, despite this tacit support from the military, Sharif failed to win.

Foreign Policy wrote that one clear thing is the old methods used to silence people's voices are no longer effective. A new generation of young voters has emerged in Pakistan who are calling for a departure from the past and seeking the ability to elect their leaders, rather than allowing the military, which has historically dominated politics to maintain control over the country. In a separate piece, it wrote that one key factor in the PTI's success in the election was their refusal to let the military control the election's outcome, despite their efforts to ensure the PTI's defeat, and that the PTI's challenge to break the military's grip on politics, has sparked some hope for the future of Pakistan's democracy and wrote that accusations of military's vote manipulation will further fuel anti-establishment feelings in the country.

=== Reruns ===
The ECP ordered elections to be held again on 15 February in twenty-six polling stations of the NA-88 Khushab-II constituency in Punjab after a mob destroyed election materials at the office of the returning officer. Due to security issues re-polling was ordered in six polling stations of NA-43 Tank-cum-Dera Ismail Khan constituency in Khyber Pakhtunkhwa to be held on 17 February. Elections were also ordered repeated in the provincial assembly constituencies in PS-18 Ghotki-I in Sindh and PK-90 Kohat-I in Khyber Pakhtunkhwa after election materials were either stolen or destroyed.

== International observers ==
In October 2023, the ECP issued invitations to foreign election observers, emphasizing transparency in the election process. Before the elections, Pakistan received visa applications from 81 foreign journalists and 38 international observers. Visa applications were processed, and accreditation was made mandatory for foreign observers upon arrival in Pakistan. Eligible applicants were in the process of being approved with visas. The Pakistan High Commission in London issued visas to 37 British journalists, including prominent figures such as Christina Lamb of The Times, allowing them to cover the election proceedings in Pakistan.

A team from the Commonwealth, led by former Nigerian President Goodluck Jonathan, was sent to Pakistan to monitor the elections. The Commonwealth Observer Group (COG), commended the ECP for its role in maintaining peace and smooth conduct during the elections. Despite the recent suspension of mobile and internet services, the observers confirmed that the voting process in Pakistan remained uninterrupted. Jonathan emphasized the importance of casting votes over internet services. The COG released its initial findings, acknowledging the efforts of the ECP and other institutions in organizing the general elections.

The European Union (EU) did not send a full election observation mission as it had done in previous years. The European Union informed the Pakistani Government that it would not be able to deploy a full mission due to lack of time. Instead, a small team of experts visited Pakistan during the elections. Ambassador of the European Union in Pakistan Ms. Reena Kivinka said that various government officials have been informed about this decision. Despite the absence of a full EU observer group, the Election Commission of Pakistan (ECP) maintained an open-door policy and welcomed an observation mission for the upcoming general elections. The small EU expert mission was still able to provide valuable insight into the electoral process.

== Aftermath ==
Protests were held by the PTI and other parties in cities across Pakistan to protest alleged electoral fraud. Dozens were arrested following protests in Lahore while highways were blocked in Balochistan. On 14 February, the JUI-F's leader Fazal-ur-Rehman said that he rejected the election results and announced that his party would stage protests against the ECP. Awami National Party provincial president for Khyber Pakhtunkhwa Aimal Wali Khan in a press conference rejected the results of the elections, claiming they were already decided before voting began. He admitted their past cooperation with the establishment was a mistake and vowed not to work with them anymore. He also accused the military of using the country's resources for their benefit.

On 12 February, Jahangir Tareen and Pervez Khattak announced their decision to retire from politics entirely, while Siraj-ul-Haq resigned from his position as the emir of Jamaat-i-Islami. Later, Khattak stepped down as the leader of the PTI-Parliamentarians while Jamaat-e-Islami unanimously refused to accept Haq's resignation as its leader.

On 16 February, the PTI held a press conference where they labelled the election as the "largest voter fraud" in Pakistan's history, targeting the party and its candidates. They asserted that 85 seats had been unfairly taken away from them.

The party announced plans for nationwide protests on 17 February to denounce widespread electoral rigging. On the same day, PTI-affiliated candidate Salman Akram Raja was arrested in Lahore while participating in a protest.

During the first Senate session after the election, there were widespread calls by members for an inquiry into the election process, with senators from the JI and the PTI urging legal action against the chief election commissioner.

In September 2025, Imran Khan addressed a letter to Chief Justice of Pakistan Yahya Afridi in which he raised concerns about his imprisonment conditions and broader political developments. In the letter, Khan claimed that PTI had won a "landslide victory" in the 2024 general elections despite political repression, but alleged that the public mandate was "stolen overnight," undermining the democratic process and constitutional order. He also referred to the Commonwealth Observer Group’s report on the elections, which, according to Drop Site News, was "buried" after it found significant problems with the polls.

=== Formation of a new federal government ===
On 10 February, in an AI-generated victory speech from prison, Imran Khan claimed that based on completed forms provided by polling agents, his party had won a two-thirds majority. On 13 February, the PTI announced that it would try and form a government through its affiliated independent candidates in the national level and in Punjab with the Majlis Wahdat-e-Muslimeen (MWM) party. It also said that it would seek to form a coalition with the Jamaat-e-Islami Pakistan (JI) party to lead a government in Khyber Pakhtunkhwa. Khan had previously said that he would not engage with the PML-N's Nawaz Sharif and the PPP's Bilawal Bhutto Zardari, calling them "corrupt". On 14 February, the JI rejected the proposed coalition with the PTI in Khyber Pakhtunkhwa, citing a change in the latter's stance over the formation of the provincial government, as the PTI only offered a coalition at the provincial level, not nationally.

Nawaz Sharif, whose party won a plurality of seats in parliament, said that he would seek to build a governing coalition with the PPP. Since the election, at least six winning independent candidates to the National Assembly have announced that they would be joining the PML-N, including PTI-affiliated candidate Waseem Qadir, who was previously a PML-N member until 2018. He alleged he was abducted and therefore he re-joined PML-N, but skeptics suggested he was bribed.

After the election results, both Nawaz Sharif and Bilawal Bhutto-Zardari, who were contenders for the prime minister's position, withdrew from the race. On 13 February, at a press conference at the residence of the Pakistan Muslim League (Q)'s Chaudhry Shujaat Hussain in Islamabad, the PML-N's Shehbaz Sharif, the PPP's Asif Ali Zardari, Muttahida Qaumi Movement – Pakistan's Khalid Maqbool Siddiqui, Balochistan Awami Party's Sadiq Sanjrani and Istehkam-e-Pakistan Party's Aleem Khan announced that their parties had agreed to form a coalition government. PML-N spokesperson Marriyum Aurangzeb said that Shehbaz was the prime ministerial nominee following his elder brother Nawaz's recommendation. PPP leader Bilawal Bhutto Zardari said that he would endorse a PML-N nominee for prime minister and that the PPP would not join the next cabinet. He also expressed a desire to see his father Asif Ali Zardari return as president, and said that his party would field nominees for the chairmanship of the Pakistani Senate and the speakership of the National Assembly. A senior PPP leader was quoted as saying that the party preferred to have a minimal role in the coalition government saying that "We don't want to take that heavy responsibility." Analysts suggest that this arrangement seemed to enjoy the backing of the military. JUI-F chief Fazal-ur-Rehman, a long-time ally of the PML-N, declined to support the PML-N and instead suggested that the PML-N should sit on the opposition benches. The coalition agreement between the PML-N and the PPP was finalized on 20 February, with Shahbaz Sharif as prime minister and Asif Ali Zardari as president. Media termed this coalition as "PDM 2.0" in reference to the previous coalition led by PML-N and PPP following Imran Khan's removal as prime minister. Khurshid Shah revealed that the PPP initially approached the PTI instead of the PML-N to explore possibilities in forming a government but was turned down by the PTI.

Only three weeks before the election, Bhutto Zardari had criticized the PML-N saying their "policies had hurt the country's economy," and remarked "Fool me once, shame on you, fool me twice, shame on me", when asked about the possibility of entering into a coalition with the PML-N. In response, Imran Khan called the upcoming coalition a "daylight robbery" and warned "against the misadventure of forming a government with stolen votes." Akhtar Mengal, the president of the Balochistan National Party (Mengal), said that the PML-N and PPP-led coalition would collapse within one and a half years due to the parties "blackmailing" each other, citing previous coalition governments. Observers noted that the increased support for the PTI had changed the power dynamics, making a Sharif-led government seem weak even before it began. A PML-N leader, speaking anonymously, acknowledged that the party might not complete its full five-year term if it forms a government and stated that the party's entire election campaign centred around Nawaz Sharif becoming the prime minister, which resulted in feelings of betrayal and disappointment among supporters when Nawaz chose to nominate Shehbaz for the position instead. JUI-F chief Fazal-ur-Rehman also reiterated his belief that the incoming coalition government is unlikely to complete its full five-year tenure. He further cautioned about the risk of a "system collapse" in the country due to excessive interference from the establishment and added that the establishment aimed to ensure that people aligned with their preferences were elected to the assemblies.

On 27 February, a leaked video surfaced showing MQM-P leader Syed Mustafa Kamal, where he was shown saying during an MQM-P party meeting that PML-N leaders informed him about the PPP's claim that the "MQM-P's mandate is 100% fake". Kamal later confirmed the authenticity of this video. Later on the same day, Sindh Governor and MQM-P leader Kamran Tessori also acknowledged in another leaked audio recording that the MQM-P "did not get votes in this election," and emphasized the difference from the 2018 general election when MQM-P obtained seven seats, which was their actual vote bank.

On 16 February, senior PTI official Asad Qaiser said that Imran Khan had nominated Omar Ayub Khan, a grandson of former military ruler Muhammad Ayub Khan, as the PTI's nominee for prime minister, despite him being in hiding over charges relating to the May 9 riots. The PTI also nominated Mian Aslam Iqbal and Ali Amin Gandapur as its respective nominees for chief minister in Punjab and Khyber Pakhtunkhwa. Later that day however, PTI official Muhammad Ali Saif stated that the party had chosen to be in the opposition both at the federal level and in Punjab, following the directives of Imran Khan.

On 19 February, the PTI announced that it would form an alliance with the Sunni Ittehad Council (SIC) solely to secure its portion of reserved seats in the National, Punjab, and Khyber Pakhtunkhwa assemblies. Following the announcement, nearly all PTI-backed independent candidates in national and provincial assemblies submitted affidavits to the ECP, officially joining the SIC and approached the ECP to claim their reserved seats. However, the PPP, the PML-N, and the MQM-P challenged the allocation of reserved seats to the PTI/SIC bloc, arguing that the latter did not qualify as a "parliamentary party". PTI chair Gohar Ali also emphasized that an NA session could not be called without first notifying the reserved seats for the PTI-backed SIC bloc. The ECP withheld the allocation of 78 out of the total 226 reserved seats for women and minorities in the national and four provincial assemblies. By 26 February, these 78 reserved seats were pending allocation to the PTI/SIC, awaiting the ECP's decision.

==== Inauguration of the National Assembly ====
President Arif Alvi declined to convene the National Assembly's inaugural session, which is typically summoned within 21 days of the general elections as per the constitution. He was also of the view that Assembly was not complete and therefore the ECP should distribute the reserved seats for women and minorities to the PTI-backed SIC bloc. As a result, he faced significant criticism from the PPP and the PML-N who asserted that the President's action amounts to "abrogating the Constitution" by not convening the session, and warned of potential legal consequences. Imran Khan also endorsed Alvi's decision to decline the summoning of the session and said that they were drafting a letter to the International Monetary Fund (IMF), urging for the condition that any of its discussions with the incoming PML-N/PPP coalition government should be contingent upon an independent audit of the general election. This action was heavily criticized by the PML-N and the PPP, who argued that sending such a letter would be tantamount to inviting foreign intervention in the country's domestic affairs. On 28 February, the National Assembly Secretariat scheduled the inaugural session for 29 February at 10 a.m., bypassing the need for notification from Alvi. At the very last moment, Alvi relented and approved a summary for calling the inaugural session late at night, albeit with reservations about the tone of the summary from caretaker prime minister Anwaar-ul-Haq Kakar.

On 29 February, a total of 302 newly elected legislators took their oaths, marking the commencement of the 16th National Assembly. The maiden session, however, was disrupted by chaos and slogans in favour of Imran Khan. This was the first time where PTI MNAs were able (due to parliamentary privilege) to chant Imran Khan's name and display his photos on live TV since a ban was imposed on mentioning his name on television. The PTI's nominee for the premiership, Omar Ayub Khan, along with PTI chair Gohar Ali Khan, emphasized during their addresses to the session that the Assembly remained incomplete as MNAs nominated for reserved seats were unable to attend the session and take the oath. On 4 March, a five-member bench of the ECP, chaired by CEC Sikandar Sultan Raja, delivered a much-awaited 4-1 verdict to dismiss the plea from the PTI/SIC for reserved seats in the National Assembly. The ruling stated that the bloc is not eligible for reserved seats and asserted that leaving reserved seats vacant is not permissible, and thus these seats would be allocated to other political parties based on their proportional representation. However, the ECP Punjab member disagreed from the majority decision. PTI leaders criticised the verdict and vowed to contest the ECP's ruling in court while several lawyers and activists also criticized the ECP for its decision. Speaking to the media from jail, Imran Khan also criticized the denial of reserved seats to the PTI as unconstitutional, drawing parallels to the disenfranchisement of East Pakistan following the 1970 Pakistani general election which ultimately resulted in the country's disintegration. On 8 March, several members of the provincial and national assemblies who were allocated reserved seats, which were denied tp the PTI/SIC, took their oaths in respective assemblies. This occurred despite PHC injunctions and notices to the ECP instructing lawmakers not to take their oaths. On 14 March, the Peshawar High Court dismissed the PTI/SIC petition challenging the ECP's decision to reject the party's allocation of reserved women and minority seats. After which some PTI party leaders made controversial statements attributing PTI's loss of reserved seats in the parliament to its decision to enter into an alliance with the Sunni Ittehad Council (SIC).

After the allocation of reserved seats, excluding the PTI/SIC bloc, to other political parties, the PML-N emerged as the largest party in the National Assembly, gaining 16 seats to reach 123, while the PPP's count increased to 73 and the JUI-F's to 11. On 6 March, the ECP uploaded Forms 45, 46, 48, and 49 on its website about a month post the election, thereby violating the legal requirement for their release within 14 days after the polls. In a press conference, the PTI leaders including Gohar Ali Khan described the Forms 45 released by the ECP on its website as "heavily tampered", resulting in the outcomes favoring PTI's opponent candidates. They also asserted possession of "original and signed Form-45s," alleging significant "fraud" in the compilation of election results. The PTI declared their intention to approach the Supreme Court regarding the purported alteration of Form-45s and called for a comprehensive and independent audit of the election outcomes.

On 10 March, the PTI/SIC officially nominated Omar Ayub Khan as the leader of the opposition in the National Assembly.

==== Election of the Prime Minister ====
←2022	3 March 2024	Next→
Candidate	Party	Votes Obtained
Required majority →		169 out of 336
Shehbaz Sharif	PMLN	201
Omar Ayub	PTI	92
Abstentions		N/A

On 2 March, Shehbaz Sharif of the PML-N and PTI-backed independent candidate Omar Ayub Khan submitted their nomination papers for the prime ministerial elections. The next day on 3 March, Shehbaz was re-elected as Prime Minister of Pakistan for the second time, securing 201 votes against the 92 votes received by Omar Ayub Khan. Due to the absence of a clear majority for any single party in the assembly, Shehbaz was elected with the joint support from PML-N's allies such as the PPP, MQM-P, PML-Q, BAP, PML-Z, IPP, NP among others. He would soon afterwards be officially sworn in. During the session, PTI-backed SIC MNAs chanted slogans alleging that Shehbaz came to power through rigging with Omar Ayub terming the Shehbaz' PM election as 'illegal'. Omar Ayub Khan also condemned censorship in his speech after the state-run Pakistan Television Corporation was reported to have abruptly ceased live broadcasting as soon as he had started to speak, comparing it with live coverage of Shehbaz's statements.

The cabinet of Shehbaz Sharif was formally sworn in by President Asif Ali Zardari on 11 March.

==== Election of the President ====
The coalition agreement which was reached also called for Asif Ali Zardari to return as President of Pakistan. On 3 March, the police conducted a raid on Pashtunkhwa Milli Awami Party (PKMAP) leader Mahmood Khan Achakzai who was also a presidential candidate in the 2024 Pakistani presidential election contesting against PPP leader Asif Ali Zardari. The PKMAP claimed that the raid was a reaction following a speech delivered by Achakzai in the National Assembly where he criticized the "establishment" for their interference in the polls. On 8 March, Achakzai, in a letter to the ECP requested the postponement of the presidential elections, citing concerns that holding elections without reserved seats in the assemblies would be unconstitutional. However, the ECP dismissed Achakzai's request.

On 9 March, Zardari secured his second term as President of Pakistan with the backing of the PML-N and rest of the ruling coalition in a vote held by the national and provincial assemblies. Zardari received 411 votes, while Achakzai received 181 votes. The PTI denounced the vote as "illegal," asserting that the election of the "king of corruption," referring to Zardari, was forced upon the nation.

=== Formation of provincial governments ===
On 23 February 2024, the 18th Punjab Assembly convened approximately 313 newly elected MPAs were sworn in. This included 193 from the PML-N, 98 PTI-backed independents, 13 from the PPP, 10 from the PML-Q, five from the IPP, and one each from the TLP and the PML-Z. On 26 February, Nawaz Sharif's daughter, Maryam Nawaz, was elected as the first female chief minister of Punjab with 220 votes in the assembly, while her opponent PTI-backed candidate Rana Aftab Ahmad Khan boycotted the elections. The next day, the PTI announced that it would convene a separate Punjab Assembly session to select its chief minister, speaker, and deputy speaker, asserting a majority with 250 MPAs, including those from reserved seats for women and minorities. They labeled the election of Maryam Nawaz to the chief ministership "a stolen mandate" and asserted that she was defeated on her provincial assembly seat from PP-159 Lahore-XV by a PTI-backed candidate, Mehr Sharafat.

On 24 February, 147 MPAs of the 16th Sindh Assembly took their oath of office, of which 84 MPAs from the PPP, 28 from the MQM-P, 14 independents, including those backed by the PTI, and two each from the GDA and JI. On 26 February, PPP leader Syed Murad Ali Shah was re-elected as the Sindh Chief Minister for a third consecutive term, receiving 112 votes. His opponent, Ali Khursheedi of the MQM-P, garnered 36 votes.

On 28 February, the 12th Provincial Assembly of Khyber Pakhtunkhwa convened as more than 115 newly elected MPAs were sworn in. Among those sworn in were 87 PTI-backed SIC lawmakers, nine from the JUI-F, eight from the PML-N, five from the PPP, two from the PTI-Parliamentarians, and four independents. The next day, Ali Amin Gandapur, a PTI backed independent candidate was elected as the Chief Minister of Khyber Pakhtunkhwa, securing 90 votes. His opponent, Ibadullah Khan of the PML-N, received 16 votes.

On 28 February, 57 newly elected MPAs of the 12th Baloch Assembly were sworn in where the PPP and the PML-N emerged as the two largest parties. On March 2, Sarfraz Bugti was elected unopposed as the new Chief Minister of Balochistan with the joint support of the PPP and the PML-N.

== Reactions ==
=== Domestic ===
After polling closed, caretaker Prime Minister Anwaar ul Haq Kakar said that the elections were a "momentous occasion". He praised the enthusiasm of the people of Pakistan and expressed appreciation for their participation in the polling process, adding that "the high voter turnout is a clear indication of public commitment to shaping the future of our country."

Chief Election Commissioner Sikandar Sultan Raja thanked the nation for the successful election and expressed gratitude to all stakeholders, including government bodies, security agencies, media, and voters. He urged returning officers to ensure timely results delivery. The Pakistan Armed Forces, through its media wing ISPR, extended congratulations to the nation for the peaceful conduct of the general elections, emphasizing their role in advancing democracy and fulfilling the aspirations of the people. Chief of the Army Staff (COAS) Asim Munir urged citizens to move on from the politics of "anarchy and polarization", adding that a stable hand was needed to unite "Pakistan's diverse polity", and to make "democracy functional and purposeful". During the first Corps Commanders' Conference held at the Pakistani military headquarters following the election and chaired by Asim Munir, the military rejected claims of election interference.

President Arif Alvi, stated that the use of electronic voting machines (EVMs) could have averted the uncertainty surrounding the election results and reminded of his efforts to introduce them in the country's electoral process.

In a message from jail, Imran Khan claimed that the PTI won 170 seats, achieving a two-thirds majority in the 2024 elections. He emphasized the power of the electorate and called for the protection of their votes. According to Khan's sister, Aleema Khan, he described the rigging as the "Mother of all rigging" and ridiculed the PML-N, saying "Instead of honouring the vote, the 'selected ones' have honoured the boot," implying that the PML-N prioritized military influence over respecting the electoral process.

The Pakistan Foreign Ministry in a statement expressed surprise at international criticism regarding the elections, citing the complexity of the electoral process and the strong participation of millions of voters.

The day after the election, the Pakistan Stock Exchange shed 2,200 points on opening, or 3.6% of its value, as delayed results and prospects of a hung parliament loomed.

Dawn in its editorial titled "Respect the mandate" stated it is becoming increasingly clear that there is widespread anger and resentment towards the military's continuous involvement in civilian affairs, and urged the armed forces to abandon its grudge against the PTI. It added that "though the public's decision was quite evident, some quarters still attempted to stamp their will over the election results." It also noted that "the state must realise that, sometimes, a vote for the underdog is a vote against the establishment". Dawn referred to the largest number of independent candidates winning in a party-based election as a significant development in Pakistan's electoral history, describing it as a "seismic shift" and a clear message from the public that sidelining PTI and depriving them of their election symbol would not alter the election's trajectory.

The Express Tribune in its editorial stated "the fact that the people of Pakistan have made a choice, and have voted for parliamentary democracy must come as a soothing consolation." Hamid Mir stated that PML-N supporters claimed to have received more votes on the day after the election.

Hina Jilani, co-founder of the Human Rights Commission of Pakistan, expressed her astonishment at the election outcome, stating that she, like everyone else, was taken aback, saying that "It's strange for me to say this, but I don't think the Pakistani public has ever played a strong role in enforcing democracy in this country." and that "we have not seen a public uprising against the military takeover of political space in this country."

The day after the election concluded, several notable Pakistani journalists, which include Syed Talat Hussain, Meher Bukhari, and Hamid Mir, took to Twitter to openly criticize the ECP, labeling its performance as a 'farcical failure' due to its inability to efficiently deliver election results.

=== International ===
- Australia – The Department of Foreign Affairs and Trade in a press statement expressed regret saying that "the Pakistani people were restricted in their choice, since not all political parties were allowed to contest these elections."
- European Union – High Representative for Foreign Affairs Josep Borrell called upon the relevant authorities to "ensure a timely and full investigation of all reported election irregularities and to implement the recommendations of the upcoming EU Election Expert Mission report."
- United Kingdom – Foreign Secretary David Cameron in a statement noted "serious concerns raised about the fairness and lack of inclusivity of the elections" while also acknowledging "the restrictions imposed on internet access on polling day, significant delays to the reporting of results and claims of irregularities in the counting process".
- United States – In a rare strong statement, State Department spokesman Matthew Miller called for a "full investigation into the claims of interference or fraud" during the elections while reiterating to work with whoever forms the next government. Several US lawmakers expressed concerns over the conduct of polls, poll-related violence, and restrictions on freedom of speech. White House spokesperson expressed concern about "intimidation and voter suppression," emphasizing that they were closely monitoring the situation in Pakistan.
- China – Chinese foreign ministry spokesperson Mao Ning congratulated Pakistan on its general elections describing relationship as 'All-Weather Strategic Cooperative Partners' with Chinese president Xi Jinping sending congratulatory message to Prime Minister Shahbaz Sharif.
- Iran - Iranian Foreign Ministry spokesperson Nasser Kanaani congratulated Pakistan over holding successful general elections with Iranian President Ibrahim Raisi congratulated Prime Minister Shehbaz Sharif

Following the election, Pakistan's classification in the Democracy Index was revised downward by the Economist Intelligence Unit, shifting it from a hybrid regime to an authoritarian regime.

On 27 February, Moody's retained Pakistan's ratings at 'Caa3' with a stable outlook. Nevertheless, the agency emphasized significantly high risks of liquidity and external vulnerability challenges, terming the election "controversial." The agency suggested that this situation could severely limit the decision-making capacity of the incoming coalition government. Earlier in February 2023, Moody's downgraded Pakistan's rating from Caa1 to Caa3.

On 28 February, at least 31 members of the United States Congress wrote a letter to US President Joe Biden, urging him to withhold recognition of the incoming coalition government until a "thorough, transparent, and credible" audit of the election is conducted. The letter also demanded that the United States cease military and other cooperation with Pakistan. Among those critical of the results was Congressman Ro Khanna who also alleged that the Pakistani military was backing Nawaz Sharif. In an interview, Congressman Greg Casar expressed concerns about American hypocrisy regarding Pakistani democracy, stating that he has directly contacted the State Department about it. He also warned Pakistan's Ambassador to the United States that existing laws could be utilized to reduce aid to Pakistan due to its human rights abuses.

On 8 March, in an unusual political statement, the International Monetary Fund (IMF) urged Pakistani authorities to resolve all electoral disputes fairly and peacefully.

On 20 March, a Congressional hearing titled "Pakistan After the Elections: Examining the Future of Democracy in Pakistan and the US-Pakistan Relationship" took place, during which Donald Lu provided testimony before a subcommittee of the US House Committee on Foreign Affairs. Lu stated that the term "free and fair" was never used to describe the 2024 Pakistani elections and recommended that the ECP investigate allegations of election fraud. Additionally, he warned that if the ECP fails to address these allegations, it could negatively impact America's relationship with Pakistan.

== See also ==
- List of members of the 16th National Assembly of Pakistan
- 2024 Punjab provincial election
- 2024 Sindh provincial election
- 2024 Khyber Pakhtunkhwa provincial election
- 2024 Balochistan provincial election
- 2024 Pakistani presidential election
