= Gomal =

Gomal may refer to:

- Gomal, Tank, a union district in Pakistan
- Gomal River, flowing from Afghanistan to Pakistan
  - Gomal Dam, located on the Gomal River in South Waziristan, Pakistan
- Gomal District, a district of Paktika Province, Afghanistan
- Gomal University, located in Dera Ismail Khan, Pakistan
- Gomal Medical College, a public college in Pakistan
