= Opinion polling for the 2024 Pakistani general election =

In the run up to the 2024 Pakistani general election, various organisations have been carrying out opinion polling to gauge voting intention throughout Pakistan and the approval rating of the civilian Pakistani government, first led by Imran Khan's Pakistan Tehreek-e-Insaf until 10 April 2022 and then by Shehbaz Sharif's Pakistan Muslim League (N), with the latter government being supported by the Pakistan Democratic Movement and the Pakistan People's Party. The results of such polls are displayed in this article. The date range for these opinion polls are from the previous general election, held on 25 July 2018, to the present day.

Opinion polling near elections by top Pakistani election surveyors namely Gallup Pakistan, Center for Public Opinion Research, Institute of Public Opinion Research (IPOR) and IRIS showed that PMLN has regained its position against its rival PTI since June 2023, mainly due to return of Nawaz Sharif from exile and Supreme court’s decision disallowing bat symbol. Center for Public Opinion Research conducted a public opinion survey of the central Punjab a week before the 2024 elections where the Majority 41% of the respondents said that they will vote for PMLN during the upcoming general elections, while 34% said PTI and 7% said they will vote for TLP in upcoming general elections. As contrary to the general perception in the social and traditional media PMLN has emerged most popular party in Punjab province which have majority of seats in Pakistan National assembly comparable with 2013's elections when they received 41% of votes and now, they are standing around the same level at 45%. Whereas PTI support is steady at 35% as comparing to last July 2018 elections in Punjab. https://cpor.com.pk/ https://cpor.com.pk/wp-content/uploads/2024/01/Political-Pulse-of-Central-Punjab.pdf

== National Assembly Voting intention ==
The results in the tables below (excluding the column on undecided voters and non-voters) exclude survey participants who said they wouldn't vote or they didn't know who they would vote for and add up to 100%. In polls that include undecided voters or non-voters, percentages are adjusted upwards in order to make the total equal 100%. Margins of error are also adjusted upwards at the same rate to account for the increase.

=== Nationwide ===
Last date of polling	Polling firm	Link	PTI	PML(N)	PPP	MMA (Note: Certain polls only include data for the JUI(F) instead of the MMA, and in those cases data for the JUI(F) is used because the JUI(F) is the largest constituent party of the MMA and makes up most of its base.)	TLP	Other	Ind.	Lead	Margin of error	Sample size	Undecideds & Non-voters (Note: This is a column that lists the percentage of undecided voters and non-voters in certain polls that publish this data. As some polls do not publish any data whatsoever on undecided voters and non-voters, the columns with survey participants that had a preference when polled are all that is needed to reach 100%. In surveys that do include data on non-voters and undecided voters, a scaling factor is applied to the margin of error and the rest of the data (for example, if the number of undecideds and non-voters equals 20%, each party would have their vote share scaled up by a factor of 100/80 (the formula is 100/(100-UndecidedPercentage)). This is done to keep consistency between the different polls and the different types data they provide.)
30 June 2023	Gallup Pakistan	PDF	42%	20%	12%	4%	4%	5%		22%	±2.5%	3,500	13%
3 June 2022	IPOR	PDF	39%	33%	12%	7%	4%	5%		6%	±2 - 3%	2,003	25%
21 March 2022	IPOR	PDF	35%	33%	19%	6%	4%	3%		2%	±2 - 3%	3,509	16%
31 January 2022	Gallup Pakistan	PDF	34%	33%	15%	6%	3%	9%		1%	±3 - 5%	5,688	33%
9 January 2022	IPOR	PDF	31%	33%	17%	3%	3%	11%	1%	2%	±2 - 3%	3,769	11%
11 November 2020	IPOR	PDF	36%	38%	13%	4%	3%	6%		2%	±3.22%	2,003	32%
13 August 2020	IPOR	PDF	33%	38%	15%	3%	3%	8%		5%	±2.95%	2,024	26%
30 June 2020	IPOR	PDF	24%	27%	11%	3%	2%	33%		3%	±2.38%	1,702	N/A (Note: This poll or crosstabulation did not include any data about undecided voters or non-voters and cut them out completely from the published results.)
24 June 2019	Gallup Pakistan	PDF	31%	28%	15%	5%	21%			3%	±3 - 5%	~1,400	N/A
22 November 2018	IPOR /IRI	PDF	43%	27%	15%	1%	1%	11%	1%	16%	±2.05%	3,991	22%
25 July 2018	2018 Elections	ECP	31.8%	24.3%	13.0%	4.8%	4.2%	10.3%	11.5%	7.5%	N/A	53,123,733	N/A

=== Punjab ===
Polling firm	Last date of polling	Link	PTI	PML(N)	PPP	TLP	Other	Ind.	Lead	Sample size	Undecideds & Non-voters
IPOR	24 January 2024	PDF	35%	45%	8%	5%	4%		8%	3313	3%
Gallup Pakistan	10 January 2024	PDF	34%	32%	11%				2%	N/A	23%
Gallup Pakistan	30 June 2023	PDF	49%	33%	5%	7%	6%		16%	N/A	N/A
IPOR	21 March 2022	PDF	34%	42%	6%	2%	16%		8%	~1,900	N/A
Gallup Pakistan	31 January 2022	PDF	35%	43%	7%	3%	9%	3%	8%	~3,100	31%
IPOR	9 January 2022	PDF	31%	46%	5%	3%	15%		15%	2,035	N/A
IPOR	11 November 2020	PDF	26%	39%	5%	2%	27%	1%	13%	1,089	N/A
2018 Elections	25 July 2018	ECP	33.6%	31.7%	5.4%	5.7%	4.8%	18.8%	1.9%	33,218,101	N/A

=== Sindh ===
Polling firm	Last date of polling	Link	PTI	PPP	MQM(P)	MMA	Other	Ind.	Lead	Sample size	Undecideds & Non-voters
Gallup Pakistan	10 January 2024	PDF	19%	42%	4%	16%			23%	N/A	16%
Gallup Pakistan	30 June 2023	PDF	43.4%	42.2%	2.4%	1.2%	10.8%		1.2%	N/A	17%
IPOR	21 March 2022	PDF	17%	44%	5%	34%			27%	~810	N/A
Gallup Pakistan	31 January 2022	PDF	30%	34%	3%	3%	28%	2%	4%	~1,300	39%
IPOR	9 January 2022	PDF	13%	44%	7%	36%			31%	867	N/A
IPOR	11 November 2020	PDF	13%	22%	1%	3%	61%		9%	467	N/A
2018 Elections	25 July 2018	ECP	14.5%	38.4%	7.7%	6.1%	25.9%	7.4%	23.6%	10,025,437	N/A

=== Khyber Pakhtunkhwa ===
Polling firm	Last date of polling	Link	PTI	PPP	MMA	ANP	PML(N)	Other	Ind.	Lead	Sample size	Undecideds & Non-voters
Gallup Pakistan	10 January 2024	PDF	45%	7%	18%	7%	9%	6%		27%	N/A	8%
Gallup Pakistan	30 June 2023	PDF	81.2%	2.4%	1.2%	1.2%	14.1%	0.0%		67.1%	N/A	15%
IPOR	21 March 2022	PDF	38%	8%	23%	8%	13%	10%		15%	~600	N/A
Gallup Pakistan	31 January 2022	PDF	44%	8%	13%	6%	21%	7%	1%	23%	~970	28%
IPOR	9 January 2022	PDF	44%	7%	17%	11%	11%	10%		27%	641	N/A
IPOR	11 November 2020	PDF	34%	4%	8%	3%	12%	26%		21%	331	N/A
2018 Elections	25 July 2018	ECP	39.3%	7.5%	18.9%	9.3%	10.7%	3.5%	10.8%	20.4%	6,611,287	N/A

=== Balochistan ===
Polling firm	Last date of polling	Link	PTI	PPP	PML(N)	MMA	BAP	BNP	NP	Other	Ind.	Lead	Sample size	Undecideds & Non-voters
Gallup Pakistan	30 June 2023	PDF	36.0%	18.0%	11.0%	7.0%	28.0%					18%	3,500	N/A
2018 Elections	25 July 2018	ECP	6.05%	3.09%	1.54%	15.28	24.44%	9.04%	4.91%	23.33%	16.95%	9.16%	1,899,565	82,178

=== Islamabad Capital Territory ===
Polling firm	Last date of polling	Link	PTI	PML(N)	PPP	TLP	MMA	Other	Ind.	Lead	Sample size	Undecideds & Non-voters
2018 Elections	25 July 2018	ECP	48.24%	24.88%	12.58%	4.66%	3.72%	1.28%	4.64%	23.36%	445,827	

== Government approval rating ==
The results in this table show polls that surveyed whether people approved or disapproved of either the overall (not on a single issue) performance of the federal government in Islamabad or the Prime Minister's overall performance since 18 August 2018.

The same rounding restrictions that were given in the previous section do not apply here, so occasionally, results will add up to 101% or 99% due to rounding errors, and neutral respondents (when data is available for them) are counted in this table, unlike the last table.

Polling firm	Last date of polling	Link	Approve	Neutral	Disapprove	DK/NA	Strongly approve	Approve	Neutral	Disapprove	Strongly disapprove	DK/NA	Net	Margin of error	Sample size	
Gallup Pakistan	21 February 2023		32%	N/A	65%	3%	11%	21%	N/A	27%	38%	3%	-33%	±3 - 5%	1,760	
NA	9 April 2022	Imran Khan is removed from Prime Minister office														
NA	Gallup Pakistan	4 April 2022	PDF	46%	N/A	54%	N/A	N/A						-8%	±3 - 5%	~800
Gallup Pakistan	31 January 2022	PDF	36%	14%	48%	3%	15%	21%	14%	18%	30%	3%	-12%	±3 - 5%	5,688	
Gallup Pakistan	4 September 2021	PDF	48%	N/A	45%	7%	N/A						+3%	±3 - 5%	~1,200	
Gallup Pakistan	19 August 2020	PDF	38%	30%	31%	2%	22%	16%	30%	13%	18%	2%	+7%	±3 - 5%	1,662	
IPOR	13 August 2020	PDF	38%	N/A	54%	7%	16%	22%	N/A	17%	37%	7%	-16%	±2.18%	2,024	
Gallup Pakistan	15 February 2020	PDF	32%	N/A	66%	1%	8%	24%	N/A	19%	47%	1%	-34%	±3 - 5%	1,208	
Gallup Pakistan	30 September 2019	PDF	45%	N/A	53%	2%	15%	32%	N/A	16%	37%	2%	-8%	±3 - 5%	1,237	
Gallup Pakistan	24 June 2019	PDF	45%	N/A	53%	2%	21%	24%	N/A	32%	21%	2%	-8%	±3 - 5%	~1,400	
Gallup Pakistan	29 December 2018	PDF	51%	N/A	46%	3%	13%	38%	N/A	26%	20%	3%	+5%	±2 - 3%	~1,141	
IPOR	1 December 2018	PDF	47%	N/A	27%	26%	17%	30%	N/A	18%	9%	26%	+20%	±2.17%	2,041	
Pulse Consultant	28 November 2018	HTML	51%	N/A	30%	19%	N/A						+21%	±2.07%	2,019	
IPOR/IRI	22 November 2018	PDF	51%	N/A	40%	5%	16%	40%	N/A	28%	12%	5%	+16%	±2.05%	3,991	
