= Abul Hasnat Zulqarnain =

Pakistani jurist

- ابُو الحسنات ذُوالقرنین

Personal details
- Relations: Muhammad Ameer Sultan Chaudhry (Son) محمد امیرسلطان چوہدری

Abul Hasnat Muhammad Zulqarnain (Urdu: ابُو الحسنات محمد ذُوالقرنین), is a Pakistani jurist who is a District and Sessions Judge in the service of Islamabad Judicial Service.

== Career ==
Prior to his appointment as a judge in the District and Sessions Court, Zulqarnain served as a judge in an Anti-Terrorism Court.

In December 2022, he was appointed to a three-year deputation by the Lahore High Court (LHC), during which his services were placed at the disposal of the Islamabad High Court (IHC). He succeeded Yar Mohammad Gondal as the special judge of the banking court in Islamabad.

Zulqarnain is facing allegations of misconduct, which may result in his repatriation to his parent department, the Lahore High Court (LHC). The Islamabad High Court (IHC) initiated this process following a contentious judicial decision and observations, wherein he granted an adjournment to a defendant in a bail petition, leading to discrepancies in the case proceedings.

== Cases ==
He presided over the cypher case involving former Prime Minister of Pakistan Imran Khan and former Foreign Minister of Pakistan Shah Mehmood Qureshi at Adiala Jail. On January 30, 2024, he sentenced both individuals to ten years in prison. In June 2024, his decision was dismissed by the Islamabad High Court.
