= Nasir Mehmood =

Pakistani politician

Member of the Provincial Assembly of Punjab
- In office 24 October 2018 – 14 January 2023
- Constituency: PP-27 Jhelum-III

Personal details
- Party: AP (2025-present)
- Other political affiliations: PMLN (2018-2025)

Nasir Mehmood is a Pakistani politician who had been a member of the Provincial Assembly of the Punjab from October 2018 till January 2023.

== Political career ==
Nasir Mehmood was elected to the Provincial Assembly of Punjab from the constituency PP-27 in the 2018 Pakistani by-elections on the ticket of Pakistan Muslim League (N). He defeated Shah Nawaz Raja of Pakistan Tehreek-e-Insaf. This constituency was vacated by federal information minister Fawad Chaudhry.
