= Masroor Ali =

Pakistani cricketer and umpire (born 1951)

Personal information
- Full name: Syed Masroor Ali
- Born: 15 May 1951 (age 75); Hyderabad, Sindh, Pakistan

Umpiring information
- ODIs umpired: 1 (1986)
- Source: Cricinfo, 16 May 2014

Masroor Ali (born 15 May 1951) is a Pakistani former cricketer and umpire. Born in Hyderabad in the Sindh province, he mainly umpired in domestic games, but also officiated in a single One Day International (ODI), the 5th ODI during the West Indies tour of Pakistan, in 1986.

== See also ==
- List of One Day International cricket umpires 259
