= Hafiz Mumtaz Ahmed =

Pakistani politician

Provincial Minister of Punjab for Excise, Taxation and Narcotics Control
- In office 27 August 2018 – 10 April 2022

Member of the Provincial Assembly of the Punjab
- In office 15 August 2018 – 14 January 2023
- Constituency: PP-105 Faisalabad-IX

Personal details
- Party: PTI (2018-present)

Hafiz Mumtaz Ahmed (born 1 April 1970) is a Pakistani politician has been Provincial Minister of Punjab for excise, taxation and narcotics control, in office from 27 August 2018 till 10 April 2022. He had been a member of the Provincial Assembly of the Punjab from August 2018 till January 2023. He is the son of Chaudhry Mukhtar Ahmed Gujjar who is a notable business personality of Faisalabad.

== Political career ==
He was elected to the Provincial Assembly of the Punjab as a candidate of Pakistan Tehreek-e-Insaf from Constituency PP-105 (Samundari-IX) in the 2018 Pakistani general election.

On 27 August 2018, he was inducted into the provincial Punjab cabinet of Chief Minister Sardar Usman Buzdar and was appointed Provincial Minister of Punjab for excise, taxation and narcotics control.
