= Abid Mahmood =

Pakistani cricketer (born 1977)

Abid Mahmood (Pakistani Cricketer)
Personal information
- Full name: Abid Mahmood
- Born: 15 July 1977 (age 49); Okara, Pakistan
- Batting: Right-handed
- Bowling: Right-arm medium
- Source: Cricinfo, 17 June 2021

Abid Mahmood (born 15 July 1977) is a Pakistani cricketer who played List A cricket for the Pakistan Television cricket team
