= Gomal, Tank =

Coordinates: 32°07′N 70°09′E

Gomal
- Union Council
- Interactive map of Gomal
- Country: Pakistan
- Province: Khyber Pakhtunkhwa
- District: Tank
- Time zone: UTC+5 (PST)
- Number of towns: 8
- Number of Union Councils: ADD HERE

Gomal is an administrative unit, known as Union council, of Tank District in the Khyber Pakhtunkhwa province of Pakistan.

== See also ==
- Tank District
