= 2022 Pakistani by-elections =

Pakistani by-elections

- 16 & 30 October 2022

9 out of 342 seats in the National Assembly
- Turnout: 29.60% ▼
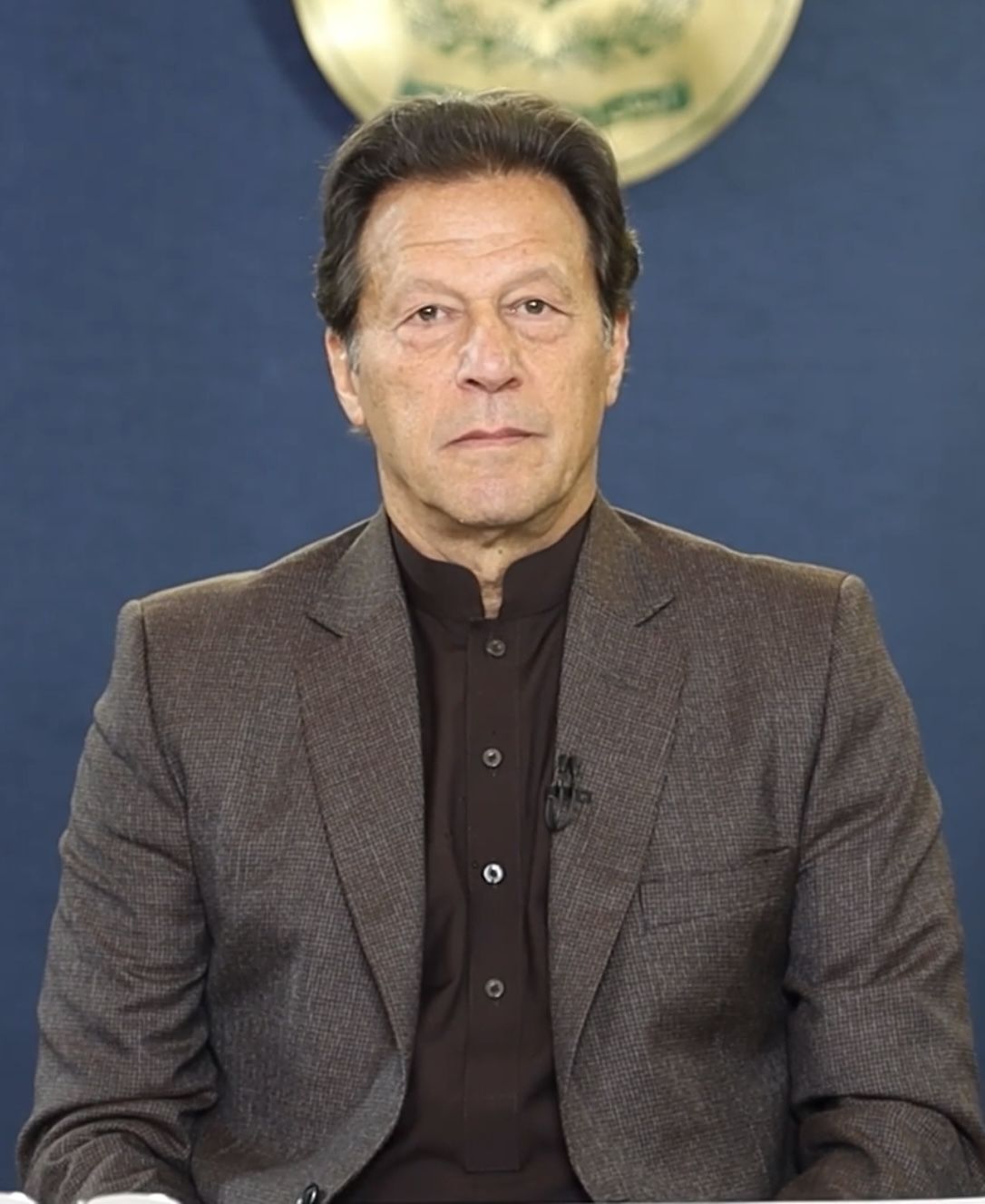

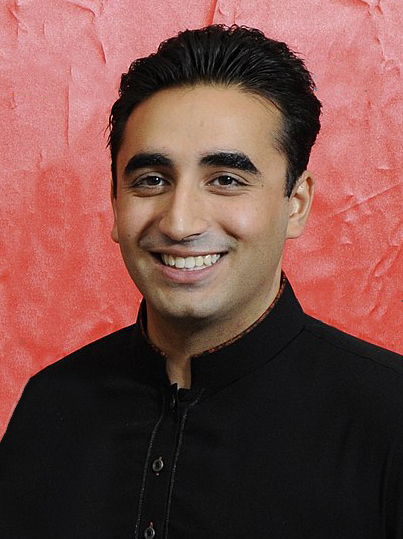
	First party	Second party
Leader	Imran Khan	Bilawal Bhutto Zardari
Party	PTI	PPP
Alliance	-	PDM
Leader since	25 April 1996	30 December 2007
Leader's seat	8 of the 9	Did not contest
Last election	37.38%, 9 seats	10.82%, 0 seats
Seats won	7	2
Seat change	▼2	▲2
Popular vote	578,551	144,400
Percentage	49.61%	12.38%
Swing	▲12.23	▲1.56
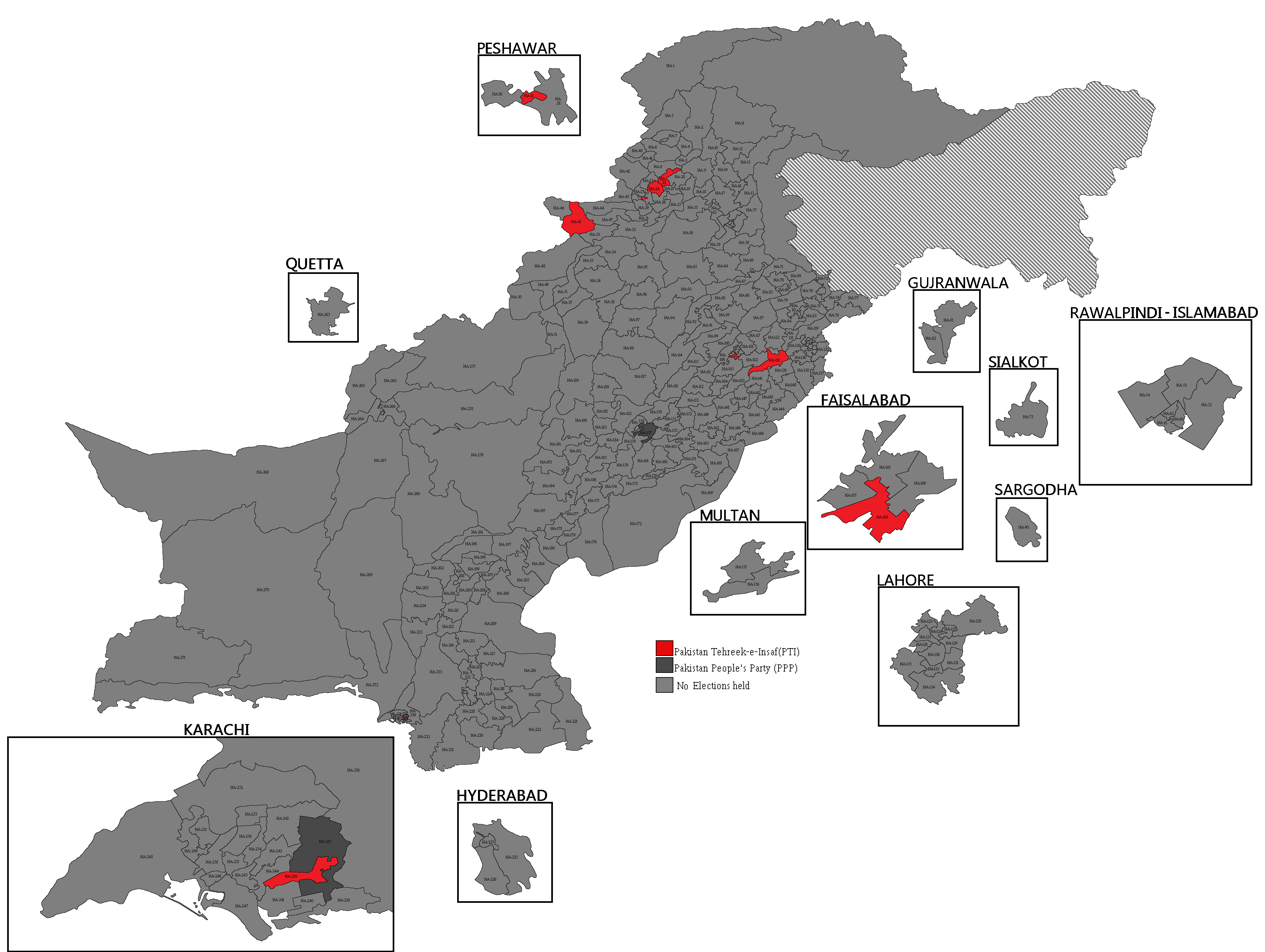

By-elections were held on 8 National Assembly and 3 Punjab Assembly constituencies in Pakistan on 16 October 2022 and 1 National Assembly seat on 30 October 2022. Pakistan Tehreek-e-Insaf got a landslide victory by winning 7 out of 9 National Assembly and 2 out of 3 Punjab Assembly seats whereas the Pakistan Democratic Movement, an alliance of 14 parties, was only able to win 2 National Assembly seats and 1 Punjab Assembly seat.

The by-elections were held on the following seats: NA-22 (Mardan-III), NA-24 (Charsadda-II), NA-31 (Peshawar-V), NA-45 (Kurram-I), NA-108 (Faisalabad-VIII), NA-118 (Nankana Sahib-II), NA-157 (Multan-IV), NA 237 (Malir-II), and NA-239 (Korangi Karachi-I).

== Background ==
After the removal of Prime Minister Imran Khan through a successful vote of no-confidence, 123 MNAs of Pakistan Tehreek-e-Insaf (PTI), along with Imran Khan and several former ministers resigned from the National Assembly of Pakistan. Although the Deputy Speaker at the time, Qasim Suri, accepted said resignations, he soon resigned from the National Assembly as well. elected Speaker Raja Pervaiz Ashraf summoned PTI MNAs to individually verify their resignations but no one appeared. On 29 July 2022, 11 of these resignations were accepted. Nine of these 11 were general seats whose members were directly elected and a further seven of these nine were for constituencies where the PTI candidate's margin of victory was extremely slim. Abdul Shakoor Shad, the MNA from NA-246 (Karachi South-I), went to the Islamabad high Court and had his resignation suspended.

The PTI MNA from NA-157 (Multan-IV), Zain Hussain Qureshi, also resigned with the rest of his party, but his resignation was not accepted. However, he ceased to be an MNA when he took oath as a member of the Provincial Assembly of Punjab on 18 July 2022.

One seat, NA-45 (Kurram-I), was also vacated, but the by-election for it was postponed till 30 October due to the deterioration of the law and order situation in the constituency.

Therefore, by-elections for 8 National Assembly constituencies were scheduled by the Election Commission of Pakistan for 16 October 2022, whereas the by-election for NA-45 was held on 30 October 2022.

== Candidates ==
According to Election Commission of Pakistan 90 candidates ran for 8 National Assembly and 3 Punjab Assembly seats. Registered voters in these 11 Constituencies were 4,506,124 out of which 2,467,856 were male and 2,038,268 were female. 2,937 polling stations were created in these constituencies out of which 1416 were combined polling stations, 807 for males and remaining 714 for female. 747 polling station were considered high sensitive and 694 were considered sensitive for security reasons. 9,869 polling booths were created: 5,294 male and 4,575 female.

National Assembly
No	District	Constituency	Candidates	Registered Voters			Polling Stations
No	District	Constituency	Candidates	Male	Female	Total	Polling Stations
1	Mardan	NA-22	4	263,024	208,160	471,184	330
2	Charsadda	NA-24	4	298,002	245,681	543,683	384
3	Peshawar	NA-31	8	262,289	210,891	473,180	265
4	Kurram	NA-45	14	111,349	87,269	198,618	143
5	Faisalabad	NA-108	12	271,039	234,147	505,186	354
6	Nankana Sahib	NA-118	8	250,871	199,939	450,810	319
7	Multan	NA-157	8	247,920	214,285	462,205	264
8	Malir, Karachi	NA 237	11	165,913	128,786	294,699	194
9	Korangi, Karachi	NA-239	22	311,004	270,884	581,888	330
Total			91	2,181,411	1,800,042	3,981,453	2,583

Punjab Assembly
No	District	Constituency	Candidates	Registered voters			Polling Stations
No	District	Constituency	Candidates	Male	Female	Total	Polling Stations
1	Sheikhupura	PP-139	8	126,693	100,848	227,541	153
2	Khanewal	PP-209	8	142,045	116,658	258,703	176
3	Bahwalnagar	PP-241	7	129,056	107,989	237,045	168
Total			23	397,794	325,495	723,289	497

== Results ==
=== National Assembly ===
National Assembly
Alliance	Party	Popular vote			Seats		
Alliance	Party	Votes	%	±pp	Contested	Won	+/−
PTI+	PTI	578,551	49.61	▲12.23	9	7	▼2
PDM	PMLN	153,290	13.14	▼5.75	2	0	Steady
PDM	PPP	144,400	12.38	▲1.56	3	2	▲2
PDM	ANP	100,608	8.62	▲0.30	2	0	Steady
PDM	JUI (F)	80,899	6.95	N/A†	3	0	Steady
PDM	MQM-P	18,116	1.55	▼3.75	1	0	Steady
PDM	Total	497,313	42.64	▼7.64	11	2	▲2
None	TLP	44,186	3.78	▼3.50	5	0	Steady
None	JI	20,197	1.74	N/A†	4	0	Steady
None	Others & Independents	25,969	2.23	N/A	62	0	Steady
Total		1,166,216	100%		91	9	
Valid votes		1,166,216	98.86				
Invalid votes		13,440	1.14				
Votes cast/ turnout		1,179,656	29.60				
Abstentions		2,801,797	70.40				
Registered voters		3,981,453					

† JUI (F) and JI previously contested jointly as MMA.

=== Punjab Assembly ===
2022 Pakistani by-elections
- 16 October 2022

3 out of 371 seats in the Provincial Assembly of the Punjab
- Turnout: 48.56% ▼
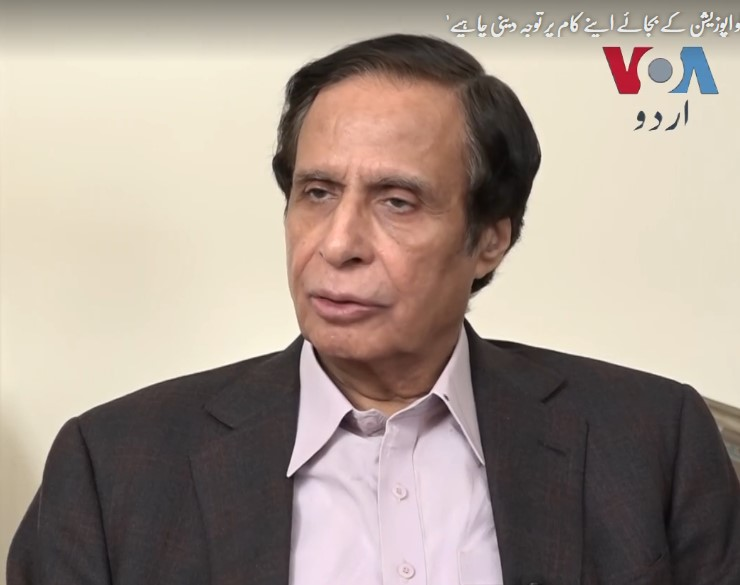

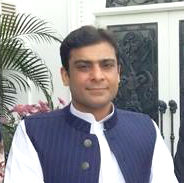
	First party	Second party
Leader	Chaudhry Pervaiz Elahi	Hamza Shahbaz
Party	PML(Q)	PML(N)
Alliance	PTI	PDM
Leader since	2 August 2022	2018
Leader's seat	Did not contest	Did not contest
Last election	32.06%, 0 seats	39.09%, 3 seats
Seats won	2	1
Seat change	▲2	▼2
Popular vote	168,825	146,579
Percentage	48.97%	42.53%
Swing	▲16.91	▲3.44
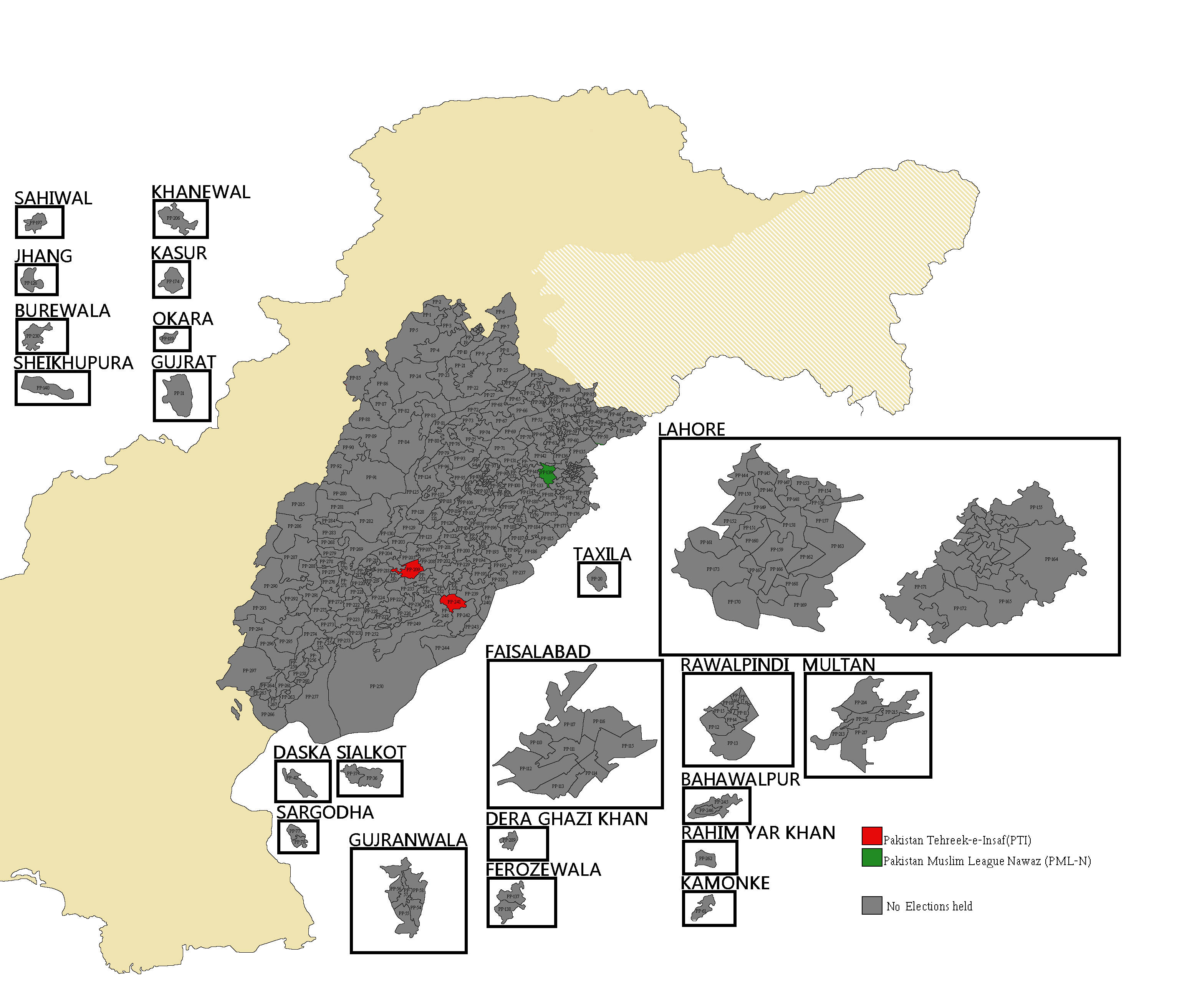

Punjab Assembly
Party	Votes			Seats		
Party	No.	%	+/-	Contested	Won	+/-
PTI	168,825	48.97	▲16.91	3	2	▲2
PMLN	146,579	42.53	▲3.44	3	1	▼2
TLP	24,152	7.00	▼0.67	3	0	Steady
JI	356	0.10	▲0.10	1	0	Steady
Others & Independents	4,872	1.40	N/A	13	0	Steady
Total valid votes	344,784	98.15		23	3	
Rejected ballots	6,483	1.85				
Total votes polled	351,267	100				
Registered Voters	723,289	48.56				

=== Result by Constituency (National Assembly) ===
National Assembly of Pakistan
No	National Assembly of Pakistan Constituency	Winner				Runner-up				Margin		Turnout
No	National Assembly of Pakistan Constituency	Candidate	Party	Votes		Candidate	Party	Votes		Margin		Turnout
No	National Assembly of Pakistan Constituency	Candidate	Party	No.	%	Candidate	Party	No.	%	No.	%	%
1	NA-22 (Mardan-III)	Imran Khan	PTI	78,681	50.01	Maulana Muhammad Qasim	JUI (F)	68,181	44.46	8,500	5.54	32.94
2	NA-24 (Charsadda-II)	Imran Khan	PTI	78,589	50.64	Aimal Wali Khan	ANP	68,365	44.05	10,233	6.59	29.02
3	NA-31 (Peshawar-V)	Imran Khan	PTI	57,818	61.14	Ghulam Ahmad Bilour	ANP	32,252	34.10	25,566	27.03	20.28
4	NA-45 (Kurram-I)	Imran Khan	PTI	20,748	58.42	Jameel Khan	JUI-F	12,718	35.80	8,030	22.62	18.47
5	NA-108 (Faisalabad-VIII)	Imran Khan	PTI	100,046	54.87	Abid Sher Ali	PML(N)	75,421	41.36	24,625	13.51	36.49
6	NA-118 (Nankana Sahib-II)	Imran Khan	PTI	90,180	45.97	Shizra Mansab Ali Khan	PML(N)	78,024	39.77	12,156	6.20	44.10
7	NA-157 (Multan-IV)	Ali Musa Gillani	PPP	107,327	53.11	Meher Bano Qureshi	PTI	82,141	40.65	25,186	12.46	44.22
8	NA 237 (Malir-II)	Abdul Hakeem Baloch	PPP	32,567	55.14	Imran Khan	PTI	22,493	38.08	10,074	17.06	20.33
9	NA-239 (Korangi-I)	Imran Khan	PTI	50,014	58.22	Syed Nayyar Raza	MQM-P	18,116	21.08	24,625	13.51	14.88

=== Khyber Pakhtunkhwa ===
==== NA-22 (Mardan-III) ====
After the resignation of Ali Muhammad Khan, the previous PTI MNA, this seat became vacant. Imran Khan, the chairman of the Pakistan Tehreek-e-Insaf (PTI), emerged victorious with 50.01% of the vote against Maulana Muhammad Qasim of the Jamiat Ulema-e-Islam (F) (JUI (F)), who was supported by the Pakistan Democratic Movement (PDM), and Abdul Wasi of the Jamaat-e-Islami Pakistan (JI).

By-election 2022: NA-22 (Mardan-III)
Party	Candidate	Votes	%	±%
PTI	Imran Khan	76,681	50.01	▲20.88
JUI (F)	Maulana Muhammad Qasim	68,181	44.46	N/A
JI	Abdul Wasi	8,239	5.37	N/A
Independent	Muhammad Sarwar	243	0.16	
Turnout		155,208	32.94	▼18.65
Rejected ballots		1,864	1.20	▼1.58
Majority		8,500	5.54	▲4.42
Registered electors		471,184		
PTI hold				

==== NA-24 (Charsadda-II) ====
After the resignation of Fazal Muhammad Khan, the previous PTI MNA, this seat became vacant. Imran Khan, the chairman of the PTI, emerged victorious with 50.64% of the vote with 50.64% of the vote against Aimal Wali Khan of the Awami National Party (ANP), who was supported by the PDM, and Mujeeb-ur-Rehman of the JI.

By-election 2022: NA-24 (Charsadda-II)
Party	Candidate	Votes	%	±%
PTI	Imran Khan	78,589	50.64	▲9.32
ANP	Aimal Wali Khan	68,356	44.05	▲14.61
JI	Mujeeb-ur-Rehman	7,883	5.08	N/A^{†}
Independent	Sparlay Mohmand	349	0.22	
Turnout		157,767	29.02	▼16.27
Rejected ballots		2,590	1.64	▼2.09
Majority		10,233	6.59	▼5.29
Registered electors		526,682		
PTI hold				

==== NA-31 (Peshawar-V) ====
After the resignation of Shokat Ali, the previous PTI MNA, this seat became vacant. Imran Khan, the chairman of the PTI, emerged victorious with 61.14% of the vote against Ghulam Ahmad Bilour of the ANP, who was supported by the PDM, and Muhammad Aslam of the JI.

By-election 2022: NA-31 (Peshawar-V)
Party	Candidate	Votes	%	±%
PTI	Imran Khan	57,818	61.14	▲6.54
ANP	Ghulam Ahmad Bilour	32,252	34.10	▲7.71
JI	Muhammad Aslam	3,816	4.03	N/A^{†}
Others	5 (Including 3 Independents)	687	0.73	
Turnout		95,953	20.28	▼21.92
Rejected ballots		1,380	1.44	▼0.80
Majority		25,566	27.03	▼1.18
Registered electors		473,180		
PTI hold				

==== NA-45 (Kurram-I) ====
After resignation of Fakhar Zaman Khan, the previous PTI MNA, this seat became vacant. Imran Khan, the chairman of the PTI, emerged victorious with 58.42% of votes against Jamil Khan Chamkhani of the JUI(F), who was supported by the PDM.

By-election 2022: NA-45 (Kurram-I)
Party	Candidate	Votes	%	±%
PTI	Imran Khan	20,748	58.42	▲28.57
JUI (F)	Jamil Khan Chamkhani	12,718	35.81	▲8.08
Others	Others (fourteen candidates)	2,050	5.77	
Turnout		36,676	18.47	▼13.95
Rejected ballots		1,160	3.16	▲0.06
Majority		8,030	22.61	▲20.59
Registered electors		198,618		
PTI hold				

=== Punjab ===
==== NA 108 (Faisalabad-VIII) ====
After the resignation of Farrukh Habib, the previous PTI MNA, this seat became vacant. Imran Khan, the chairman of the PTI, emerged victorious with 54.87% of the vote against Abid Sher Ali of the Pakistan Muslim League (N) (PML(N)), who was supported by the PDM.

By-election 2022: NA-108 (Faisalabad-VIII)
Party	Candidate	Votes	%	±%
PTI	Imran Khan	100,046	54.87	▲8.40
PML(N)	Abid Sher Ali	75,421	41.36	▼4.62
TLP	Muhammad Sadique	3,131	1.72	▼1.59
Others	9 (Including 7 Independents)	3,737	2.05	
Turnout		184,350	36.49	▼20.52
Rejected ballots		2,015	1.09	▼1.00
Majority		24,625	13.51	▲13.02
Registered electors		505,186		
PTI hold				

==== NA-118 (Nankana Sahib-II) ====
After the resignation of Ijaz Shah, the previous PTI MNA, this seat became vacant. Imran Khan, the chairman of the PTI, emerged victorious with 45.97% of the vote against Shizra Mansab Ali Khan of the PML(N), who was supported by the PDM, and Syed Afzaal Hussain Rizvi of the Tehreek-e-Labbaik Pakistan (TLP).

By-election 2022: NA-118 (Nankana Sahib-II)
Party	Candidate	Votes	%	±%
PTI	Imran Khan	90,180	45.97	▲15.39
PML(N)	Shizra Mansab Ali Khan	78,024	39.77	▲10.34
TLP	Syed Afzaal Hussain Rizvi	24,630	12.55	▼11.09
Others	5 Independents	3,357	1.71	
Turnout		198,790	44.10	▼14.54
Rejected ballots		2,603	1.31	▼2.94
Majority		12,156	6.20	▲5.05
Registered electors		450,810		
PTI hold				

==== NA-157 (Multan-IV) ====
After the resignation of Zain Qureshi, the previous PTI MNA, this seat became vacant. Ali Musa Gillani of the Pakistan People's Party (PPP), who was supported by the PDM, emerged victorious with 53.11% of the vote against Meher Bano Qureshi of the PTI. Gillani is the son of Yousaf Raza Gillani, the former Prime Minister and PPP's leader in the Senate, while Qureshi is the daughter of Shah Mahmood Qureshi, the former Minister of Foreign Affairs and vice chairman of the PTI.

By-election 2022: NA-157 (Multan-IV)
Party	Candidate	Votes	%	±%
PPP	Ali Musa Gillani	107,327	53.11	▲20.88
PTI	Meher Bano Qureshi	82,141	40.65	▲5.41
TLP	Tahir Ahmad	5,559	2.75	▲0.07
Others	5 Independents	7,040	3.48	
Turnout		204,404	44.22	▼13.10
Total valid votes		202,067	98.86	▲0.85
Rejected ballots		2,337	1.14	▼0.85
Majority		25,186	12.46	▲9.46
Registered electors		462,205		
PPP gain from PTI		Swing	15.46	

=== Sindh ===
==== NA 237 (Malir Karachi-II) ====
After the resignation of Jamil Ahmed Khan, the previous PTI MNA, this seat became vacant. Abdul Hakeem Baloch of the PPP, who was supported by the PDM, emerged victorious with 55.14% of the vote against Imran Khan, the chairman of the PTI.

By-election 2022: NA-237 (Malir-II)
Party	Candidate	Votes	%	±%
PPP	Abdul Hakeem Baloch	32,567	55.14	▲28.51
PTI	Imran Khan	22,493	38.08	▲10.30
TLP	Samiullah Khan	2,956	5.00	▼4.74
PSP	Muhammad Amir Shaikhani	279	0.47	▼0.76
JUI (F)	Muhammad Ismail	221	0.37	N/A
Others	6 Independents	550	0.93	
Turnout		59,902	20.33	▼21.90
Rejected ballots		836	1.40	▼0.43
Majority		10,074	17.06	▲15.91
Registered electors		294,699		
PPP gain from PTI				

==== NA-239 (Korangi Karachi-I) ====
After the resignation of Akram Cheema, the previous PTI MNA, this seat became vacant. Imran Khan, the chairman of the PTI, emerged victorious with 58.22% of the vote against Syed Nayyar Raza of the Muttahida Qaumi Movement – Pakistan (MQM-P).

By-election 2022: NA-239 (Korangi Karachi-I)
Party	Candidate	Votes	%	±%
PTI	Imran Khan	50,014	58.22	▲27.38
MQM-P	Syed Nayyar Raza	18,116	21.08	▼9.61
TLP	Muhammad Yasin	7,953	9.26	▼4.97
PPP	Imran Haider Abdi	4,506	5.24	▼0.06
MQM-H	Khurram Maqsood	1,590	1.85	▲0.94
PSP	Sharak Jamal	1,208	1.41	▼0.58
Others	16 (Including 14 Independents)	2,524	2.94	
Turnout		86,568	14.88	▼27.53
Rejected ballots		657	0.76	▼0.70
Majority		31,898	37.13	▲36.18
Registered electors		581,888		
PTI hold				

=== Result by Constituency (Punjab Assembly) ===
Punjab Assembly
No	Punjab Assembly Constituency	Winner				Runner-up				Margin		Turnout
No	Punjab Assembly Constituency	Candidate	Party	Votes		Candidate	Party	Votes		Margin		Turnout
No	Punjab Assembly Constituency	Candidate	Party	No.	%	Candidate	Party	No.	%	No.	%	%
1	PP-139 (Sheikhupura-V)	Chaudhry Iftikhar Ahmed	PML(N)	40,829	43.30	Muhammad Abu Bakar	PTI	37,712	40.00	3,117	3.30	41.86
3	PP-209 (Khanewal-VII)	Faisal Khan Niazi	PTI	71,156	52.27	Chaudhry Zia Ur Rehman	PML(N)	57,603	42.32	13,553	9.95	53.32
4	PP-241 (Bahawalnagar-V)	Malik Muzaffar Khan	PTI	59,957	52.42	Aman ullah Sattar	PML(N)	48,147	42.09	11,810	10.33	48.83

==== PP-139 (Sheikhupura-V) ====
After the resignation of Mian Jaleel Ahmed, the previous PML(N) MPA, this seat became vacant. Chaudhry Iftikhar Ahmad Bhangoo of the PML(N), who was supported by the PDM, emerged victorious with 43.30% of the vote against Muhammad Abu Bakar of the PTI.

By-election 2022: PP-139 Sheikhupura-V
Party	Candidate	Votes	%	±%
PML(N)	Chaudhry Iftikhar Ahmad Bhangoo	40,829	43.30	▲15.15
PTI	Muhammad Abu Bakar	37,712	40.00	▲15.35
TLP	Muhammad Rauf	15,502	16.44	▲0.22
Others	6 Independents	250	0.26	Steady
Turnout		94,293	41.86	▼17.14
Rejected ballots		964	1.01	▼3.20
Majority		24,625	13.51	▲13.02
Registered electors		2,27,541		
PML(N) hold				

==== PP-209 (Khanewal-VII) ====
After the resignation of Faisal Khan Niazi, the previous PML(N) MPA, this seat became vacant. Niazi ran for reelection as a PTI candidate and emerged victorious with 52.27% of the vote against Chaudhry Zia-ur-Rehman of the PML(N).

By-election 2022: PP-209 Khanewal-VII
Party	Candidate	Votes	%	±%
PTI	Faisal Khan Niazi	71,156	52.27	▲21.44
PML(N)	Chaudhry Zia Ur Rehman	57,603	42.32	▼1.31
TLP	Rao Arif Ali	4,697	3.45	▲0.76
Others	5 independents	2,657	1.95	
Turnout		1,37,938	53.32	▼7.96
Rejected ballots		1,825	1.32	
Majority		13,553	9.95	▼2.85
Registered electors		2,58,703		
PTI gain from PML(N)				

==== PP-241 (Bahawalnagar-V) ====
After the disqualification of Kashif Mahmood, the previous PML(N) MPA, this seat became vacant. Malik Muzaffar Khan of the PTI emerged victorious with 52.42% of the vote against Amanullah Sattar of the PML(N).

By-election 2022: PP-241 Bahawalnagar-V
Party	Candidate	Votes	%	±%
PTI	Malik Muzaffar Khan	59,957	52.42	▲11.46
PML(N)	Aman ullah Sattar	48,147	42.09	▲1.13
TLP	Ghulam Qadir	3,953	3.45	▼1.39
JI	Tahir Muhammad Yousaf	356	0.31	▲0.31
Others	3 Independents	1,965	1.72	
Turnout		1,15,743	48.83	▼7.05
Rejected ballots		1,365	1.18	
Majority		11,810	10.33	▲3.91
Registered electors		2,37,045		
PTI gain from PML(N)				

== See also ==
- 2022 Punjab by elections
- 2023 Pakistan by-elections
