= May 2023 Pakistan by-elections =

Pakistani by-elections

By-elections were to be held for 6 National Assembly constituencies in Pakistan on 28 May 2023.

These by-elections were called due to their vacation by Imran Khan, the former Prime Minister and chairman of the Pakistan Tehreek-e-Insaf. They were supposed to be held in NA-22 Mardan-III, NA-24 Charsadda-II, NA-31 Peshawar-V, NA-108 Faisalabad-VIII, NA-118 Nankana Sahib-II, and NA-239 Karachi Korangi-I.

== Background ==
After the removal of Prime Minister Imran Khan through a successful vote of no-confidence, 123 MNAs of Pakistan Tehreek-e-Insaf (PTI), along with Imran Khan and several former Ministers, resigned from the National Assembly of Pakistan. Although the Deputy Speaker at the time, Qasim Suri, accepted said resignations, he soon resigned from the National Assembly as well. Newly elected Speaker Raja Pervaiz Ashraf summoned PTI MNAs to individually verify their resignations but no one appeared.

On 29 July 2022, 11 of these resignations were accepted and nine by-elections were held in October 2022, which the PTI won in a landslide. Khan had won 7 of these 9 seats.

According to Article 223(2) of the Constitution of Pakistan, a person can not be a member of one House in "respect of more than one seat". If a person is elected to more than one seat, they shall resign all but one of their seats. If they do not resign, all of their seats will become vacant in 30 days except for the one to which they were elected last.

On 19 January 2023, Khan's victory on these 7 seats was notified by the Election Commission of Pakistan. He did not resign any of these seats, and therefore, under Article 223(2) of the Constitution, on 24 February 2023, he was de-notified from 6 of these seats. His notification from NA-45 Kurram-I was not overturned as he was elected to this seat on 30 October 2022 while he was elected to the other 6 seats on 16 October.

On 8 March 2023, the ECP issued the schedule for by-elections on these 6 seats, which stated that the polling date would be 30 April 2023, the same day as the 2023 Punjab provincial election. By-elections were suspended by the Peshawar High Court for the three seats in Khyber Pakhtunkhwa, NA-22 Mardan-III, NA-24 Charsadda-II, and NA-31 Peshawar-V.

On 10 May 2023, the ECP decided to conduct the elections in the remaining three constituencies on 28 May 2023. Finally, LHC decided to cancel the polls.
