= 2008 Pakistani provincial elections =

The 2008 Pakistani provincial elections may refer to:

- 2008 Balochistan provincial election
- 2008 North-West Frontier Province provincial election
- 2008 Punjab provincial election
- 2008 Sindh provincial election
