= Abdul Razzaq Khan =

Pakistani politician

Abdul Razzaq Khan Niazi

Member of the Provincial Assembly of the Punjab
- In office 29 May 2013 – 31 May 2018
- Constituency: PP-218 Khanewal-VII
- In office 7 October 2002 – 25 September 2007
- Constituency: PP-218 Khanewal-VII

Personal details
- Born: 7 July 1950 Murree, Punjab, Pakistan
- Died: 10 December 2022 (aged 72) Lahore, Punjab, Pakistan
- Party: Pakistan Muslim League (N) (2021-2022)
- Other political affiliations: Pakistan Tehreek-e-Insaf (2018-2021); Pakistan Muslim League (N) (2013-2018); Pakistan Muslim League (Q) (2002-2013); Pakistan Muslim League (N) (1997-2002); Pakistan People's Party (1993-1997); Pakistan Muslim League (N) (1990-1993); Pakistan People's Party (1988-1990); Islami Jamhoori Ittehad (1985-1988)

Nawabzada Abdul Razzaq Khan Niazi (7 July 1950 – 10 December 2022) was a Pakistani politician. He was a Member of the Provincial Assembly of the Punjab, from May 2013 to May 2018.

== Early life ==
Khan was born on 7 July 1950 in Murree.

He graduated in 1970 from Forman Christian College and has a degree of Bachelor of Arts.

== Political career ==
Khan ran for the seat of the Provincial Assembly of the Punjab as a candidate of Pakistan Peoples Party (PPP) from Constituency PP-177 (Khanewal-IV) in the 1988 Pakistani general election, but was unsuccessful. He received 23,329 votes and lost the seat to Irfan Ahmad Khan, a candidate of Islami Jamhoori Ittehad (IJI).

He ran for Provincial Assembly of Punjab as a candidate of Pakistan Democratic Alliance (PDA) from Constituency PP-177 (Khanewal-IV) in the 1990 Pakistani general election, but was unsuccessful. He received 23,844 votes and lost the seat to Irfan Ahmad Khan, a candidate of IJI.

He ran for the seat of the Provincial Assembly of the Punjab as an independent candidate from Constituency PP-177 (Khanewal-IV) in the 1993 Pakistani general election, but was unsuccessful. He received 10,957 votes and lost the seat to Irfan Ahmad Khan, a candidate of Pakistan Muslim League (N) (PML-N).

He ran for the seat of the Provincial Assembly of the Punjab as an independent candidate from Constituency PP-177 (Khanewal-IV) in the 1997 Pakistani general election, but was unsuccessful. He received 15,792 votes and lost the seat to Irfan Ahmad Khan, a candidate of PML-N.

He successfully ran for the Provincial Assembly of the Punjab as a candidate of Pakistan Muslim League (Q) (PML-Q) from Constituency PP-218 (Khanewal-VII) in the 2002 Punjab provincial election and won the election. He received 48,120 votes and defeated Aslam Bodla.

He ran for the seat of the Provincial Assembly of the Punjab as a candidate of PML-Q from Constituency PP-218 (Khanewal-VII) in the 2008 Punjab provincial election, but was unsuccessful. He received 32,043 votes and lost the seat to Muhammad Jamil Shah, a candidate of the PPP.

He was elected to the Provincial Assembly of the Punjab as an Independent candidate from Constituency PP-218 (Khanewal-VII) in the 2013 Punjab provincial election. He received 34,661 votes and defeated Peer Muhammad Jameel Shah, a candidate of PML-N.

In May 2018, he joined Pakistan Tehreek-e-Insaf (PTI).

He ran for the seat of the Provincial Assembly of Punjab as a candidate of the PTI from PP-209 Khanewal-VII in the 2018 Punjab provincial election, but was unsuccessful. He received 39,064 votes and was defeated by Muhammad Faisal Khan Niazi, a candidate of the PML(N).

== Death ==
He died on 10 December 2022 after suffering a sudden cardiac arrest.
