= Fazal Muhammad Khan =

Pakistani politician

- فضل محمد خان
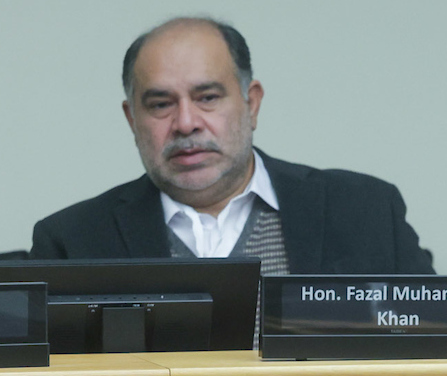

Member of the National Assembly of Pakistan
- Incumbent
- Assumed office 29 February 2024
- Constituency: NA-25 Charsadda-II
- In office 13 August 2018 – 29 July 2022
- Constituency: NA-24 (Charsadda-II)

Personal details
- Born: Charsadda, Khyber Pakhtunkhwa, Pakistan
- Party: PTI (2009-present)
- Other political affiliations: PML(Q) (2008-2009)
- Parent: Lala Nisar (father)

Fazal Muhammad Khan is a Pakistani politician who has been a member of the National Assembly of Pakistan since February 2024. He previously served as a member from August 2018 till July 2022.

== Political career ==
=== Election ===
He ran for the Provincial Assembly of the North-West Frontier Province as a candidate of Pakistan Muslim League (Q) (PML(Q)) from PF-18 Charsadda-II in the 2008 North-West Frontier Province provincial election, but was unsuccessful. He received 5,034 votes and was defeated by Arshad Abdullah, a candidate of the Awami National Party (ANP).

He joined the Pakistan Tehreek-e-Insaf (PTI) in 2009.

He ran for the National Assembly of Pakistan as a candidate of the PTI from NA-7 Charsadda-I in the 2013 Pakistani general election, but was unsuccessful. He received 40,254 votes and was defeated by Muhammad Gohar Shah, a candidate of the Jamiat Ulema-e-Islam (F) (JUI(F)).

He was elected to the National Assembly as a candidate of the PTI from NA-24 (Charsadda-II) in the 2018 Pakistani general election. He received 83,495 votes and defeated Asfandyar Wali Khan, a candidate and the leader of the ANP.

=== Resignation ===
On April 10, 2022, because of the no-confidence motion against Imran Khan, he resigned from the National Assembly on the orders of Imran Khan. The new government did not accept the resignations of many members for fear of deteriorating the number of members in the assembly. However, Speaker Raja Pervaiz Ashraf accepted the resignations of eleven members on 28 July 2022, with one of them was Fazal Muhammad Khan's. Later, a by-election was held on his seat, in which Imran Khan had emerged victorious.

=== Re-election ===
He was re-elected to the National Assembly as a PTI-supported independent candidate from NA-25 Charsadda-II in the 2024 Pakistani general election. He received 100,742 votes and defeated Aimal Wali Khan, a candidate of the ANP, who received 68,019 votes.

== More reading ==
- List of members of the 15th National Assembly of Pakistan
