= Muhammad Faisal Khan Niazi =

Pakistani politician

Member of the Provincial Assembly of the Punjab
- In office 27 October 2022 – 14 January 2023
- Constituency: PP-209 Khanewal-VII
- In office 15 August 2018 – 5 August 2022
- Constituency: PP-209 Khanewal-VII

Personal details
- Party: PTI (2013–2018; 2022–present)
- Other political affiliations: PML–N (2018–2022)

Muhammad Faisal Khan Niazi is a Pakistani politician who had been a member of the Provincial Assembly of the Punjab from October 2022 till January 2023. He previously served in this position from August 2018 till his resignation in August 2022.

== Political career ==
He ran for the Provincial Assembly of the Punjab as a candidate of the Pakistan Tehreek-e-Insaf (PTI) from PP-218 Khanewal-VII in the 2013 Punjab provincial election, but was unsuccessful. He revived 26,151 votes and was defeated by Abdul Razzaq Khan, an independent candidate.

He joined the Pakistan Muslim League (N) (PML(N)) on 9 June 2018.

He was elected to the Provincial Assembly of the Punjab as a candidate of the PML(N) from PP-209 Khanewal-VII in the 2018 Punjab provincial election. He received 55,273 votes and defeated Abdul Razzaq Khan, a candidate of the PTI.

He resigned from his seat on 22 May 2022 and re-joined the PTI on 15 July 2022. His resignation was accepted by the Election Commission of Pakistan (ECP) on 5 August 2022.

He was re-elected to the Provincial Assembly of the Punjab as a candidate of the PTI from PP-209 Khanewal-VII in the by-election that was called due to his own resignation. He received 71,156 votes and defeated Chaudhry Zia Ur Rehman, a candidate of the PML(N).
