= NA-24 Charsadda-I =

Constituency of the National Assembly of Pakistan

- Constituency for the National Assembly of Pakistan
- Region: Tangi and Shabqadar Tehsils of Charsadda District
- Electorate: 504,270

Current constituency
- Party: Pakistan Tehreek-e-Insaf
- Member: Malik Anwar Taj
- Created from: NA-24 Charsadda-I

NA-24 Charsadda-I (این اے-24، چارسدہ-١) is a constituency for the National Assembly of Pakistan. The constituency was formerly known as NA-8 (Charsadda-II) from 1977 to 2018. The name changed to NA-23 (Charsadda-I) after the delimitation in 2018 and to NA-24 (Charsadda-I) after the delimitation in 2022.

== Members of Parliament ==
=== 1977–2002: NA-8 Charsadda-II ===
| Election | Member | Party |
|---|---|---|
| 1977 | Nasim Wali Khan | PNA |
| 1985 | Fazal Dad Khan | Independent |
| 1988 | Abdul Khaliq Khan | ANP |
| 1990 | Rahmanullah khan | ANP |
| 1993 | Qazi Fazl Ullah | IJM |
| 1997 | Haji Rehmanullah | ANP |

=== 2002–2018: NA-8 Charsadda-II ===
| Election | Member | Party |
|---|---|---|
| 2002 | Aftab Ahmad Khan Sherpao | PPP-S |
| 2008 | Aftab Ahmad Khan Sherpao | PPP-S |
| 2013 | Aftab Ahmad Khan Sherpao | QWP |

=== 2018–2022: NA-23 Charsadda-I ===
| Election | Member | Party |
|---|---|---|
| 2018 | Malik Anwar Taj | PTI |

=== 2023–present: NA-24 Charsadda-I ===
| Election | Member | Party |
|---|---|---|
| 2024 | Malik Anwar Taj | SIC |

== Elections since 2002 ==
=== 2002 general election ===
2002 General Election: NA-8 (Charsadda-II)
| Party | Candidate | Votes | % | ±% |
|---|---|---|---|---|
| PPP (S) | Aftab Ahmad Khan Sherpao | 42,326 | 67.47 | |
| ANP | Iftikhar Khan Matta | 18,346 | 29.24 | |
| Independent | Haji Sharifullah Khan | 1,105 | 1.76 | |
| Communist Mazdoor Kissan Party | Shamas Khan | 962 | 1.53 | |
| Majority | | 23,980 | 38.23 | |
| Turnout | | 62,739 | 29.62 | |
| PPP-S gain from ANP | | | | |

A total of 1,673 votes were rejected.

=== 2008 general election ===
2008 General Election: NA-8 (Charsadda-II)
| Party | Candidate | Votes | % | ±% |
|---|---|---|---|---|
| QWP | Aftab Ahmad Khan Sherpao | 30,626 | 39.23 | −28.24 |
| ANP | Bashir Khan Umerzai | 29,951 | 38.37 | +9.13 |
| MMA | Anwar ul Habib | 12,239 | 15.68 | |
| PML-N | Sajjad Ali | 3,940 | 5.05 | |
| Independent | Syed Zakir Shah Bacha | 1,306 | 1.67 | |
| Majority | | 675 | 0.86 | |
| Turnout | | 78,062 | 30.80 | +1.18 |
| PPP-S hold | | Swing | | |

A total of 1,842 votes were rejected.

=== 2013 general election ===
2013 General Election: NA-8 (Charsadda-II)
| Party | Candidate | Votes | % | ±% |
|---|---|---|---|---|
| QWP | Aftab Ahmad Khan Sherpao | 37,044 | 26.62 | |
| JUI-F | Musammir Shah | 33,836 | 24.32 | |
| PTI | Jehanzeb Khan Dhakki | 30,089 | 21.62 | |
| ANP | Muhammad Taimoor Khan | 15,953 | 11.47 | −26.90 |
| JI | Abdul Mustaan | 11,034 | 7.93 | |
| PPPP | Waseef Ullah Khan | 3,848 | 2.77 | |
| PML-N | Sajjad Anwar Khan | 2,678 | 1.92 | −3.13 |
| Independent | Gul Yousaf | 1,011 | 0.73 | |
| PkMAP | Jehangir Khan | 929 | 0.67 | |
| Independent | Arbab Hussain | 895 | 0.64 | |
| TTP | Abdul Ali | 594 | 0.43 | |
| MQM | Liaqat Ali | 387 | 0.28 | |
| PML | Kurshid Ali Khan | 361 | 0.26 | |
| Independent | Umara Khan | 299 | 0.21 | |
| APML | Syed Zakir Shah | 183 | 0.13 | |
| Majority | | 3,208 | 2.30 | |
| Turnout | | 139,141 | 43.63 | +12.83 |
| QWP gain from PPP-S | | | | |

A total of 4,625 votes were rejected.

=== 2018 general election ===
General elections were held on 25 July 2018.

General election 2018: NA-23 (Charsadda-I)
| Party | Candidate | Votes | % | ±% |
|---|---|---|---|---|
| PTI | Malik Anwar Taj | 59,371 | 35.07 | |
| MMA | Haji Zafar Ali Khan | 41,391 | 24.45 | |
| QWP | Aftab Ahmad Khan Sherpao | 33,561 | 19.82 | |
| ANP | Gulzar Ahmed Khan | 18,433 | 10.89 | |
| PPP | Manzoor Bashir Ahmed | 13,966 | 8.25 | |
| Others | Others (two candidates) | 2,568 | 1.52 | |
| Turnout | | 176,069 | 42.18 | |
| Total valid votes | | 169,290 | 96.15 | |
| Rejected ballots | | 6,779 | 3.85 | |
| Majority | | 17,980 | 10.62 | |
| Registered electors | | 417,386 | | |
| PTI gain from QWP | | | | |

=== 2024 general election ===
General elections were held on 8 February 2024. Malik Anwar Taj won the election with 89,841 votes.

General election 2024: NA-24 Charsadda-I
| Party | Candidate | Votes | % | ±% |
|---|---|---|---|---|
| PTI | Malik Anwar Taj (Note: Filed nomination papers as PTI candidate but ECP allowed him to run as an Independent) | 89,841 | 45.98 | ▲10.91 |
| JUI (F) | Gohar Ali | 48,264 | 24.93 | N/A |
| QWP | Aftab Ahmad Khan Sherpao | 34,536 | 17.84 | ▼1.98 |
| Others | Others (six candidates) | 20,581 | 10.63 | |
| Turnout | | 198,882 | 39.44 | ▼2.74 |
| Total valid votes | | 193,582 | 97.34 | |
| Rejected ballots | | 6,779 | 2.66 | |
| Majority | | 41,217 | 21.29 | ▲10.67 |
| Registered electors | | 504,270 | | |

== See also ==
- NA-23 Mardan-III
- NA-25 Charsadda-II
