= 2008 Balochistan provincial election =

Election in Balochistan Provincial 2008

- 18 February 2008

All 65 seats in the Provincial Assembly 38 seats needed for a majority
- Turnout: 33.29%

	First party	Second party	Third party
Party	PML(Q)	PPP	MMA
Last election	20 seats	2 seats	18 seats
Seats won	19	14	9
Seat change	▼1	▲12	▼9
	Fourth party
Party	BNP (A)
Last election	Was not registered
Seats won	7
Seat change	New
- Results by constituency
Chief Minister before election
Jam Mohammad Yousaf
PML(Q)
Elected Chief Minister
Nawab Aslam Raisani
PPP

Provincial elections were held in the Pakistani province of Balochistan on 18 February 2008, alongside nationwide general elections and three other provincial elections in Sindh, North-West Frontier Province and Punjab.

The Pakistan Muslim League (Q) (PML-Q) came first. Aslam Raisani, from the Pakistan Peoples Party Parliamentarians (PPPP), was elected unopposed as the Chief Minister.

These elections were boycotted by the Pashtunkhwa Milli Awami Party (PMAP) in opposition to General Musharraf's rule. The National Party (NP) also boycotted the elections for the same reason, but a faction ran as NP Parliamentarians, and won 1 seat.

== Results ==
Party	Votes	%	Seats					
Party	Votes	%	General	Independents joined	Women	Non-Muslims	Total	+/−
Pakistan Muslim League (Q)	437,719	33.05	14	0	4	1	19	−1
Pakistan Peoples Party Parliamentarians	165,837	12.52	10	1	2	1	14	+12
Muttahida Majlis-e-Amal	193,876	14.64	6	0	2	1	9	−9
Balochistan National Party (Awami)	66,017	4.98	5	0	2	0	7	New
Awami National Party	64,196	4.85	2	1	1	0	4	+4
National Party Parliamentarians (Note: The National Party Parliamentarians were a minor split off group from the National Party who opposed the party's boycott of the elections.)	10,524	0.80	1	0	0	0	1	+1
MJUF	36,488	2.76	1	0	0	0	1	+1
Others	36,488	2.76	0	0	0	0	0	N/A
Independents	349,655	26.40	10	0	0	0	10	+9
Valid votes	1,368,455 (Note: The votes by party use FAFEN numbers, while the number of overall votes uses ECP numbers. As both come to different totals, the number of votes for all parties does not add up to the total number of valid votes.)	91.64						
Rejected votes	43,545	2.92						
Total votes	1,493,343	100.00						
Source: Election Commission of Pakistan (ECP), Free and Fair Election Network (FAFEN), Urdupoint
