= Munir Khan Orakzai =

Pakistani politician (died 2020)

Member of the National Assembly of Pakistan
- In office 13 August 2018 – 2 June 2020
- Constituency: NA-45 (Tribal Area-VI)
- In office 2002–2013
- Constituency: NA-38 (Tribal Area-III)

Personal details
- Born: 1959 or 1960 Manduri Kallay, Kurram District
- Died: 2 June 2020 (aged 60)
- Party: JUI (F) (2002-2020)

Munir Khan Orakzai (1959/1960 - 2 June 2020) was a Pakistani politician who had been a member of the National Assembly of Pakistan since August 2018, and Ex parliamentary leader of FATA and a senior was member of the National Assembly from 2002 to 2013.

== Political career ==
Orakzai was elected to the National Assembly of Pakistan from Constituency NA-38 (Tribal Area-III) as an independent candidate in the 2002 Pakistani general election. He received 6,619 votes and defeated an independent candidate, Gul Manan.

He was re-elected to the National Assembly from Constituency NA-38 (Tribal Area-III) as an independent candidate in the 2008 Pakistani general election. He received 16,525 votes and defeated an independent candidate, Akhunzada Obaidullah Sharif. He was the member of 18th Amendment. Due to services for the nation he received the Nishan-e-Imtiaz in 2011.

Munir khan Orakzai joined JUI F on 11 February 2013. Referring to the party's recently constituted grand jirga to discuss issues faced by the tribal people, Jan said: "He (Munir) has been attending our jirga deliberations even before joining (the party). And being a prominent tribal and political personality, he is entitled to become a member of the jirga." He was Jamiat Ulema-e Islam (F) (JUI-F) candidate for the seat of the National Assembly from Constituency NA-38 (Tribal Area-III) in the 2013 Pakistani general election. However, an election meeting of the JUI-F was attacked which killed at least 19 people. Orakzai was the apparent target of the attack claimed by Tehrik-i-Taliban Pakistan, due to which the elections were postponed in the constituency.

He was re-elected to the National Assembly as a candidate of Muttahida Majlis-e-Amal (MMA) from Constituency NA-45 (Tribal Area-VI) in the 2018 Pakistani general election. He received 16,353 votes and defeated Said Jamal, a candidate of Pakistan Tehreek-e-Insaf. The younger brother of Munir Orakzai, Dr Abdul Qadir Khan Orakzai, has been nominated political successor of the deceased.Dr. Abdul Qadir Khan Orakzai graduated from Bolan Medical College and has worked with multiple governmental and international bodies. He has been representing the Orakzai tribe within Kurram Agency at both local and national levels, actively engaging in political advocacy, tribal representation, and conflict resolution.

He has played a key role in liaising between tribal elders, government authorities, and external stakeholders, contributing to dialogue, negotiations, and decision-making processes affecting the region. His involvement extends to addressing local disputes, promoting stability, and ensuring that the interests and concerns of his community are effectively conveyed at broader administrative and national platforms.

== Death ==
He died on 2 June 2020, due to a heart attack caused by post COVID-19 complications. He had tested positive for COVID-19 in April. He was buried in his ancestral graveyard in Mandoori.
