= NA-45 =

NA-45 may refer to:

- NA-45 (Tribal Area-VI), a constituency for the National Assembly of Pakistan
- NA-16-1GV (NA-45), a variant of the North American Aviation NA-16 aircraft
