= Ziaism =

Ideology of Muhammad Zia-ul-Haq

Ziaism is a political ideology implemented in Pakistan from 1978 to 1988 by Muhammad Zia-ul-Haq. The ideology endorses the idea of an Islamic state, influenced heavily by religion. It includes Islamic laws, Islamization, industrialisation, privatisation, militarism and authoritarianism. Zia and his doctrine are widely credited with making political Islam an influential movement within Pakistan, turning a relatively secular country into one that was based on Islamic law.

The ideology attracts much controversy, especially in Pakistan, where religious and secular ideas collide.

== History ==
Pakistan, when founded in 1947, did not immediately become an Islamic state. It stayed as a dominion until 1956, when the first constitution was adopted. Only then did Pakistan declare Islam to be the state religion. However, the leadership of Ayub Khan continued a secular form of government, until the premiership of Zulfikar Ali Bhutto.

Bhutto, despite initially coming on a secular platform, found himself under pressure by Islamists to push religion into governance. Under pressure, he branded Ahmadis as non-Muslims, banned alcohol and tolerated Islamic ideas. This would pave the way to Zia's rise to power and his subsequent leadership.

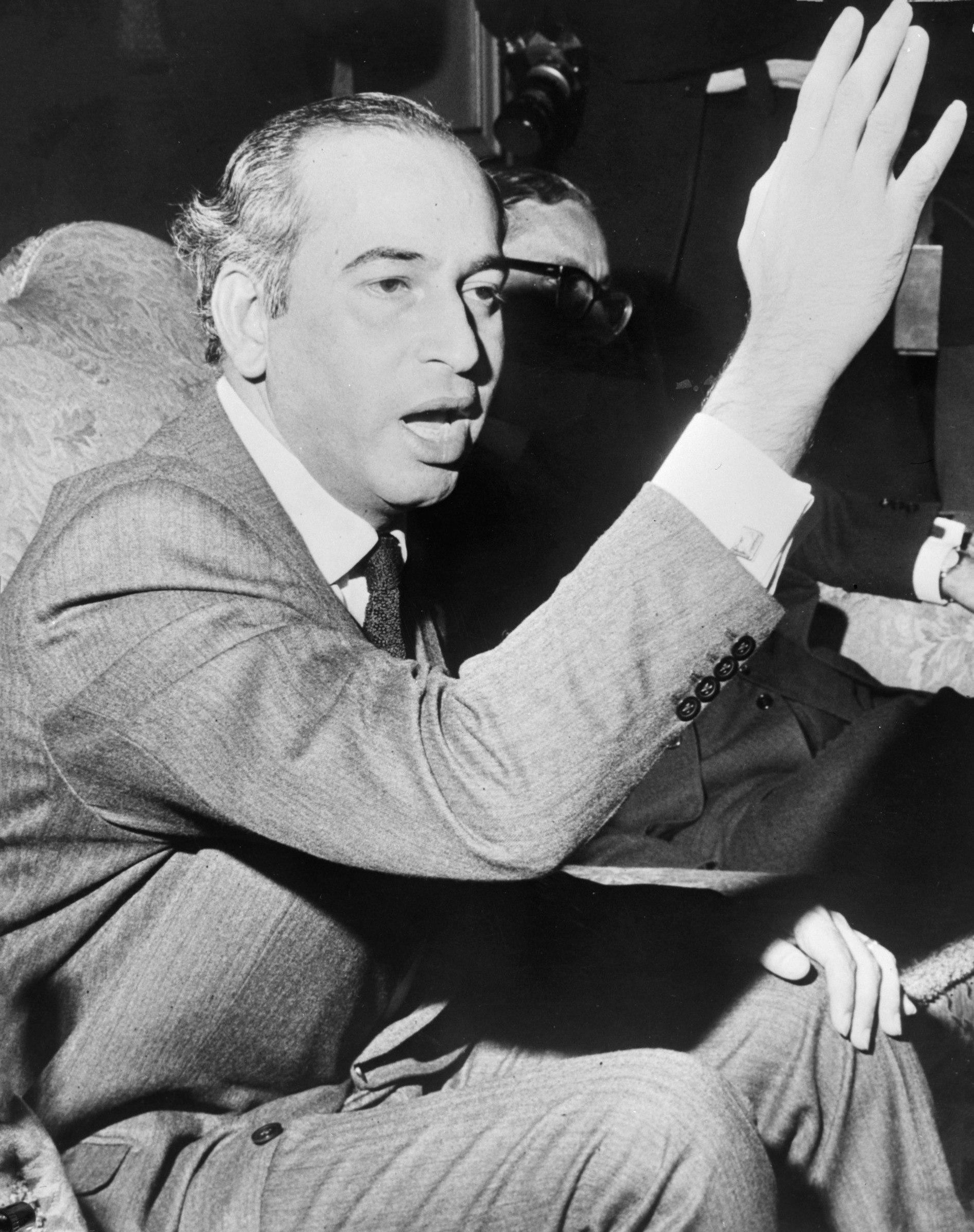
Zulfikar Ali Bhutto, the ninth Prime Minister of Pakistan. He introduced increasingly Islamic laws due to political pressure. He would eventually be overthrown by Zia-ul-Haq himself in Operation Fair Play.

After Operation Fair Play, Zia had assumed the role of Chief Martial Law Administrator. He then proceeded to implement Islamist ideas, such as Islamic law. This included the criminalisation of adultery, fornication, and blasphemy, using unconventional ways of punishments to punish offenders, such as flogging, amputation, and stoning.

Ziaism did not only influence political and religious matters, but also ones concerning economics, and foreign policy. His approach to foreign affairs would strengthen Pakistan's role as a regional power, by spreading its military influence internally and externally.

== Society ==
"When I took over on the fifth of July, I promised three things. I said first and foremost, I will bring back Islamic values, I will introduce [and] I will venture for the Islamization of laws, and bring in Islamic values, and third, I'll hold elections."

— Muhammad Zia-ul-Haq with interviewer Vanya Kewley

Ziaism advocates for Islam to dictate every single way of life, however, there is debate on which kind of Islam should. For example, while Ziaist Pakistan had an emphasis on Deobandi Islam being an inspiration for law and general society, the Islamic Republic of Iran based theirs on Twelver Shia Islam. This resulted in varying differences between the two societies, despite the latter's influence from the former.

=== Law ===
Ziaist rule advocates for all institutions to adhere to religious law, from everything regarding to property to punishment.

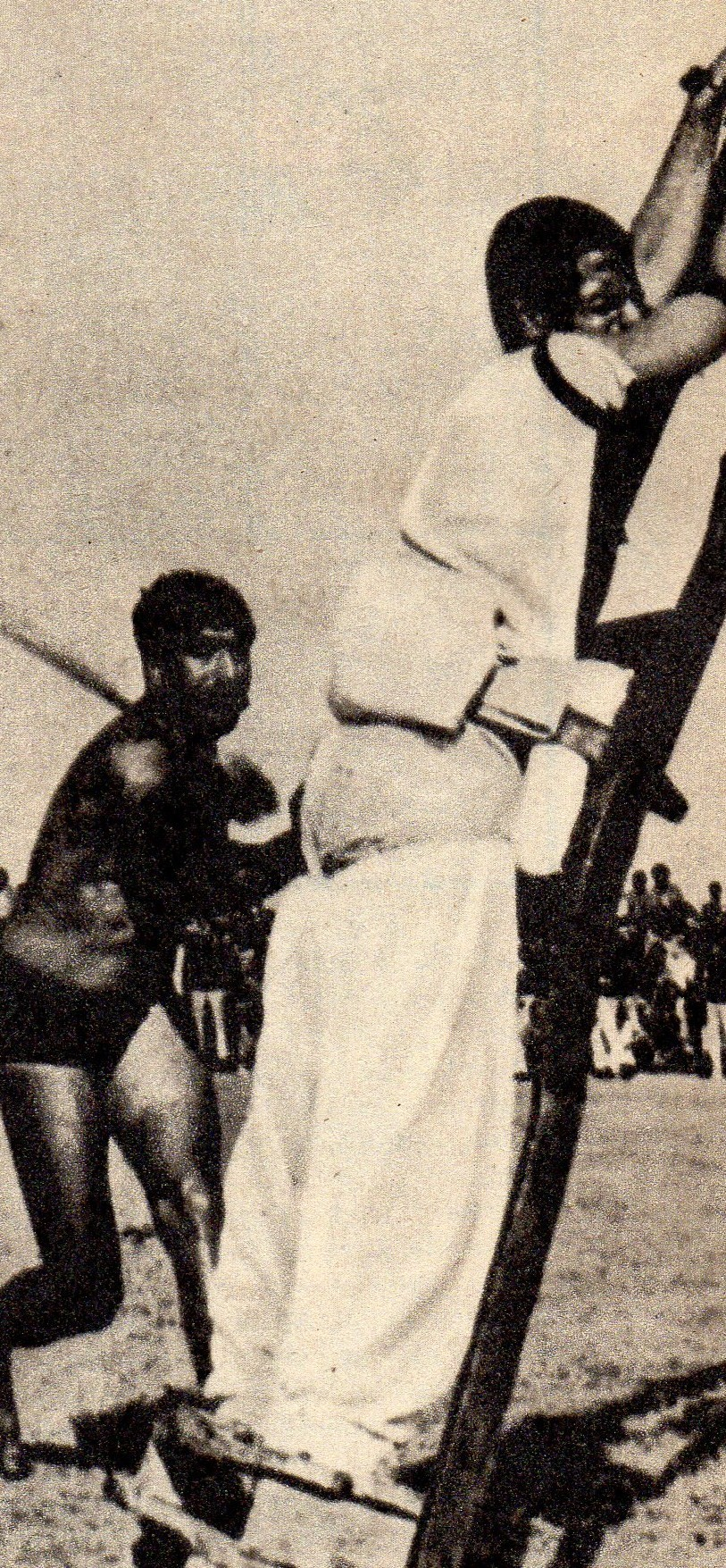
A man being flogged due to seducing a woman in 1970s Islamabad.

Corporal punishment and amputation for crimes are a common way of punishing a criminal in Ziaist ideology. For example, stealing is punished by amputation of the left hand. While flogging is used for the crimes of rape, adultery, and protesting for freedom of the press. These punishments would be orchestrated in public view, with a microphone positioned near the convict’s mouth for the crowd to hear.

These punishments would be designed to ignite fear throughout the common populace, in order to deter reoffenders. These convicts would often be convicted for crimes according to Islamic law, such as drinking and premarital sex. Such punishments would also be designed to humiliate the convict, by naming them and their alleged crimes, and exposing the men's buttocks towards the crowd, who would often be apathetic.

=== Recreation ===
Alcohol was already banned under the tenure of Zulfikar Ali Bhutto, but was emphasised by Zia’s ideology. 80 lashes would be given to a Muslim offender caught consuming alcohol, while non-Muslims could sell and drink alcohol (although only with a government permit). Nightclubs, bars and cinemas were shut down, and Pakistani nightlife, especially in the city of Karachi, was deeply affected due to the religious laws that were implemented.

Pakistani cinema was also heavily curtailed, with the state heavily censoring films that did not align with government philosophy. Due to this heavy censorship, Pakistani cinema had steeply declined to around 20 films in 2005. Zia’s ideology believed in using public cinemas in order to spread state propaganda and prevent dissent amongst the common populace.

== Military ==
Ziaism puts an emphasis of military power, especially over civilian institutions. An aggressive foreign military policy may also be affiliated, as seen in Zia's involvement in Afghanistan and India. Militarism is a central value in Ziaist ideology, relying on a strong military in order to protect the country’s self interests, as well as hold sway over the country’s institutions.

This was seen in Zia’s Pakistan, where he established military courts, giving military officers judicial power, allowing them to issue imprisonments and corporal punishments, such as amputation or flogging. These officers are promoted regarding their loyalty to the government in order to ensure religious law and subservience to the state.

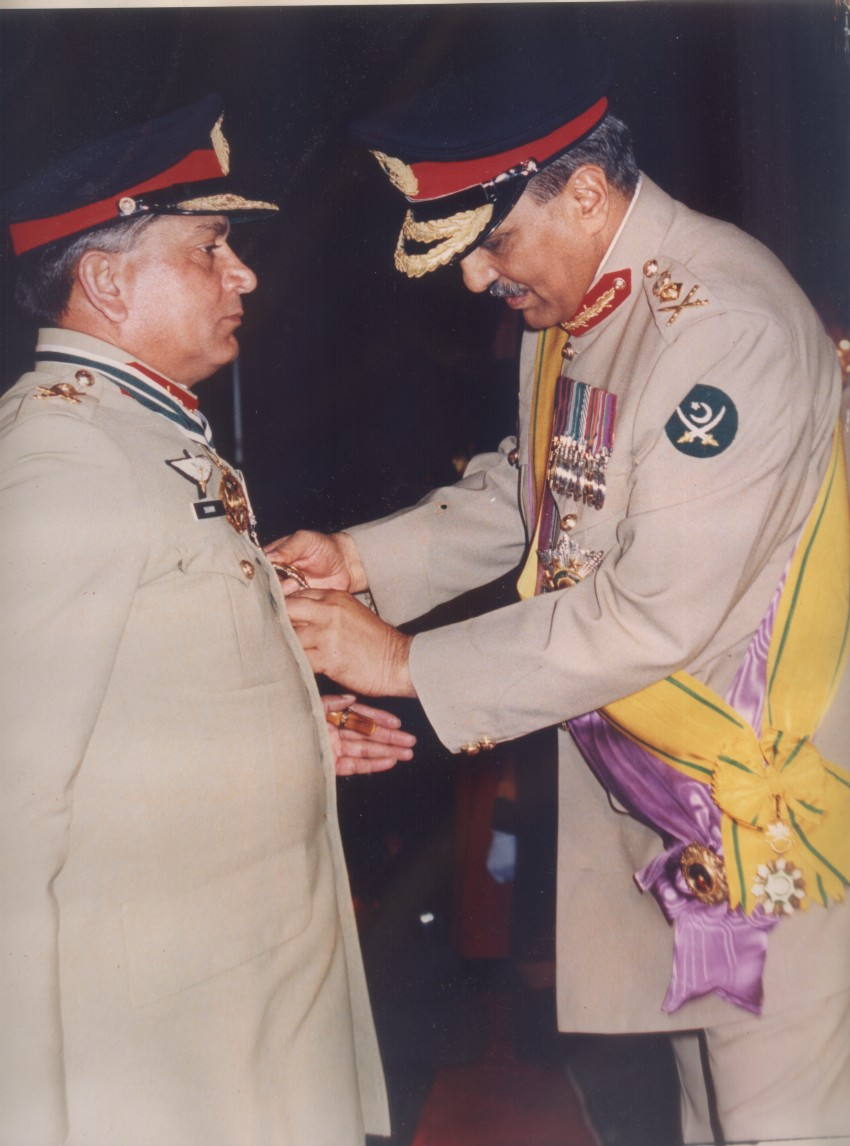
Zia rewarding the Hilal-i-Imtiaz to Shamim Alam Khan.

Pakistan was also a major supporter of the Afghan mujahideen during the Soviet invasion of Afghanistan. Pakistan's national intelligence service cooperated closely with several mujahideen factions, including Hezb-e Islami Gulbuddin. Pakistan also coordinated with various other nations to this end, including the United States (Operation Cyclone) and Saudi Arabia.

== Economics ==
Ziaism ideology relies on a capitalist form of government, endorsing deregulation of the economy, and reducing state affairs in it. This is done in order to encourage private sector activity, and encourage economic growth. In Zia’s Pakistan, these economic reforms were done in order to reverse Zulfikar Ali Bhutto's nationalisation policies, which had brought economic decline and rampant corruption.

The ideology expands on a nation using its religious character in order to boost economic leverage. For example, under Zia's Pakistan, he took advantage of Pakistan's Islamic image in order to create favourable economic links with the oil-producing Arab states, as well as securing Pakistan's “security and territorial sovereignty.”

Ziaism also endorses an Islamic interest-free banking system.

== Criticism ==
Many figures, both inside Pakistan and outside have criticised Ziaism as an oppressive ideology. It is described as “illiberal” and “despotic”. Democracy is not seen as a central virtue of the ideology, along with equal rights for minorities. Ziaism emphasises an Islamic society with little room for religious minorities.

Ziaism is also compared to an Islamic version of fascism, beside its capitalist economic policies.

As a part of his ideology, Zia introduced and enforced the Hudud Ordinance, which had controversial implications regarding laws on zina (pre-marital sex). The ordinance led to thousands of rape victims being imprisoned on the charges of zina, and also became a tool of misuse to quell and compromise women’s fundamental rights.

== See also ==
- Secularism in Pakistan
- Soft Haqqism
