= Lala Nisar =

Pakistani politician

- Lala Nisar Muhammad Khan a.k.a. Lala Nisar

Member of the Senate of Pakistan
- In office unknown–unknown

Minister for Housing and Works
- In office 2008–unknown

Minister for Railways
- In office unknown–unknown

Member of the National Assembly of Pakistan
- In office 1966–unknown

Personal details
- Born: Lala Nisar Muhammad Khan c. 1930 Charsadda, Khyber Pakhtunkhwa
- Died: February 23, 2016 (aged 85–86) Charsadda, Khyber Pakhtunkhwa
- Party: Pakistan Peoples Party; National Awami Party; Pakistan Muslim League (N); Pakistan Muslim League (Q)
- Children: Fazal Muhammad Khan, Naseer Mohammad Khan, Saeed Mohammad Khan
- Parent: Yar Mohammad Khan of Charsadda (father)
- Education: Islamia College Peshawar; Lawrence College Ghora Gali

Lala Nisar Muhammad Khan (Urdu: لالہ نثار محمّد خان c. 1930 – 23 February 2016 (Note: The following sources did not mention date of birth, but the subject died at 86, which indicates that he may have been born around 1930)), also known as Lala Nisar, was a Pakistani politician, senator, member of parliament, and cabinet minister, who served railway minister during the Muhammad Khan Junejo's government, and later housing and works minister in 2008 while representing province Khyber Pakhtunkhwa of Pakistan.

He was born to Yar Mohammad Khan (was a prominent Khan of Charsadda and an elder in his tribe of Pareech Khel) in Charsadda district of Khyber Pakhtunkhwa . He had three sons, including Fazal Muhammad Khan, Naseer Mohammad Khan, and former Member of the Provincial Assembly Saeed Mohammad Khan. In 1955, he went to England where he received his higher education, including graduation in 1966. He attended Islamia College Peshawar at faculty of arts for further or earlier studies. Before graduating in UK, he attended the Lawrence College Ghora Gali.

== Political career ==
Nisar started his political career after returning to home from the United Kingdom. He contested his first-ever election in 1966 and was elected as the member of parliament for West Pakistan. Later, he contested in 1985 Pakistani general election as an independent candidate and was elected as the member of National Assembly of Pakistan until the next elections. During the period, he served adviser to the federal government for health and railways ministries. He is also credited for his contribution to the Pakistan Peoples Party's formation. On the occasion of a political speech against Ayub Khan delivered by then Pakistan's 16th prime minister Zulfikar Ali Bhutto, Nisar was inspired by the speech which was aimed at on the Tashkent Declaration and he subsequently joined the party. However, he later disassociated himself from the party over Bhutto's policies against farmers, and later he formed the Zamindar Tehreek (Farmer's movement) party aimed at to oppose political agenda of Bhutto.

From 1971 to 1990, he was a selected member of the coalition against the National Awami Party. It is believed he and Khan Abdul Wali Khan were very close to each other, leading him not to contested further elections against Wali Khan. During his last elections, he joined Pakistan Muslim League (N) political party and served as a senator while represented Khyber Pakhtunkhwa. He was later appointed Khidmat Committee's chairperson for Peshawar Division. He according to The Express Tribune supported Nawaz Sharif during the 1999 Pakistani coup d'état, and later joined the Pakistan Muslim League (Q).

== Arrests ==
He along with Asfandyar Wali Khan was charged with Hayat Sherpao's murder case and was imprisoned from February 1975 to July 1977. He was released from the jail after the Operation Fair Play was launched by a military dictator Muhammad Zia-ul-Haq against Zulfikar Ali Bhutto.

== Death ==
He died of a cardiac arrest on 24 February 2016 in Charsadda town of Khyber Pakhtunkhwa.
