= Gauhar Rehman =

Pakistani Islamic scholar, Mufassir, Muhaddith and politician

Maulana Gauhar Rehman MNA

Member of the National Assembly of Pakistan
- In office 1985–1988
- Constituency: NA-7

Personal details
- Born: 1936 Chamrasi village, Dara Shangoli, Mansehra district
- Died: 18 March 2003 (aged 66–67)
- Occupation: Islamic scholar, Mufassir and Muhaddith
- Parent: Muhammad Sharifullah (father)

Religious life
- Denomination: Sunni

Maulana Gauhar Rehman (1936 – 18 March 2003) was a Pakistani Islamic scholar, Mufassir and Muhaddith as well as a politician from Jamaat E Islami Pakistan who had served as a member of the 7th Assembly National Assembly of Pakistan from 20 March 1985 to 29 May 1988.

Maulana Gohar Rehman was born in 1936 to Muhammad Sharifullah in Chamrasi village, Dara Shangoli, Mansehra district, Khyber Pakhtunkhwa. His great-grandfather Maulana Abdul Karim was a great religious scholar who took part in the jihad against the Sikhs in the company of Akhund Darweza. His father was also a great religious scholar and Imam who offered valuable religious services in the Gobhai, Mansehra district.
