= PP-242 Bahawalnagar-VI =

Constituency of the Punjabi Provincial Legislature, Pakistan

- Constituency for the Provincial Assembly of Punjab
- Region: Fort Abbas Tehsil (partly) including Fort Abbas town of Bahawalnagar District

Current constituency
- Created from: PP-284 Bahawalnagar-VIII (2002-2018); PP-243 Bahawalnagar-VII (2018-2023)

PP-242 Bahawalnagar-VI (پی پی-242، بہاولنگر-6) is a Constituency of Provincial Assembly of Punjab.

== General elections 2024 ==
Provincial election 2024: PP-242 Bahawalnagar-VI
Party	Candidate	Votes	%	±%
Independent	Kashif Naveed (Note: Filed nomination papers as PTI candidate but ECP allowed him to run as an Independent)	52,607	40.33	
PML(N)	Muzaffar Iqbal	39,431	30.23	
PML(Z)	Muhammad Noman Javed	11,967	9.17	
TLP	Majid Hussain	10,440	8.00	
Kissan Ittehad	Muhammad Arshad	6,251	4.79	
PPP	Muhammad Amir Wattoo	4,390	3.37	
Others	Others (fifteen candidates)	5,365	4.11	
Turnout		133,110	57.72	
Total valid votes		130,451	98.00	
Rejected ballots		2,659	2.00	
Majority		13,176	10.10	
Registered electors		230,617		
hold				

== General elections 2018 ==
Provincial election 2018: PP-243 Bahawalnagar-VII
Party	Candidate	Votes	%	±%
PML(N)	Dr. Mazhar Iqbal Ch.	46,138	36.79	
PML(Z)	Ghulam Murtaza	39,388	31.40	
Independent	Shahid Imran	16,621	13.25	
Independent	Mian Abdul Wahid	11,161	8.90	
TLP	Muhammad Yousaf	6,628	5.29	
MMA	Rasheed Ahmad	1,889	1.51	
Independent	Abdul Hannan Wahid	1,872	1.49	
Others	Others (five candidates)	1,725	1.38	
Turnout		128,239	60.07	
Total valid votes		125,422	97.80	
Rejected ballots		2,817	2.30	
Majority		6,750	5.39	
Registered electors		213,481		

== General elections 2013 ==
Provincial election 2013: PP-284 Bahawalnagar-VIII
Party	Candidate	Votes	%	±%
PML(Z)	Muhammad Naeem Anwar	26,668	27.29	
PPP	Kashif Naveed Pansota	25,938	26.54	
PML(N)	Muhammad Noman Javaid	21,103	21.59	
Independent	Tahir Naeem	8,666	8.87	
Independent	Ghulam Irtaza Wafa Wattu	6,159	6.30	
Independent	Hafiz Ajlal Hyder	3,856	3.95	
Pakistan Kissan Ittehad	Muhammad Amir Watto	2,275	2.33	
Others	Others (twelve candidates)	3,070	3.14	
Turnout		100,894	64.58	
Total valid votes		97,735	96.87	
Rejected ballots		3,159	3.13	
Majority		730	0.75	
Registered electors		156,228		

== General elections 2008 ==
Contesting candidates	Party affiliation	Votes polled

== See also ==
- PP-241 Bahawalnagar-V
- PP-243 Bahawalnagar-VII
