= Malik Anwar Taj =

Pakistani politician

Member of the National Assembly of Pakistan
- Incumbent
- Assumed office 29 February 2024
- Constituency: NA-24 Charsadda-I
- In office 13 August 2018 – 25 January 2023
- Constituency: NA-23 (Charsadda-I)

Personal details
- Born: Charsadda, Khyber Pakhtunkhwa, Pakistan
- Party: PTI (2018-present)

Malik Anwar Taj is a Pakistani politician who has been a member of the National Assembly of Pakistan since 29 February 2024. He previously served as a member from August 2018 till January 2023.

== Political career ==
He was elected to the National Assembly of Pakistan as a candidate of Pakistan Tehreek-e-Insaf (PTI) from Constituency NA-23 (Charsadda-I) in the 2018 Pakistani general election. He received 59,371 votes and defeated Haji Zafar Ali Khan, a candidate of Muttahida Majlis-e-Amal (MMA).
