= 2023 Pakistani parliamentary crisis =

Pakistani parliamentary crisis

2023 Pakistani parliamentary crisis began when 127 MNAs belonging to the Pakistan Tehreek-e-Insaf (PTI) resigned en masse from National Assembly. Finally, all by-elections have been suspended by the High Courts from the four provinces.

These by-elections were called due to the acceptance of resignations of members of the National Assembly (MNAs) from the Pakistan Tehreek-e-Insaf (PTI).

== Background ==
After the removal of Prime Minister Imran Khan through a successful vote of no-confidence, 123 MNAs of Pakistan Tehreek-e-Insaf (PTI), along with Imran Khan and several former Ministers, resigned from the National Assembly of Pakistan. Although the Deputy Speaker at the time, Qasim Suri, accepted said resignations, he soon resigned from the National Assembly as well. Newly elected Speaker Raja Pervaiz Ashraf summoned PTI MNAs to individually verify their resignations but no one appeared.

On 29 July 2022, 11 of these resignations were accepted and by-elections were held in October 2022, which the PTI won in a landslide.

On 17 January 2023, 35 more resignations were accepted. 33 of these 35 resignations were of MNAs who were elected on general seats, and hence, by-elections are required for these seats. 32 of these seats belonged to the PTI, and one belonged to the Awami Muslim League (AML). On 20 January 2023, 35 more resignations were accepted, and 31 of these seats required by-elections. Therefore, a total of 64 by-elections will have to happen.

On 27 January 2023, the Election Commission of Pakistan (ECP) announced the date for the first set of 33 by-elections to be 16 March 2023. Later, on 3 February 2023, the ECP announced the date for the second set of 31 by-elections to be 19 March 2023.

On 20 February 2023, the Lahore High Court (LHC) suspended the ECP's de-notification orders of MNAs from Punjab and therefore, by-elections were suspended for 27 of these 64 constituencies, but will happen for the remaining 37.

On 1 March 2023, the Islamabad High Court (IHC) and the Balochistan High Court (BHC) suspended the ECP's de-notification orders of all three MNAs from Islamabad and the single MNA from Balochistan, respectively. Therefore, by-elections were suspended for these four constituencies as well.

On 3 March 2023, the Peshawar High Court had suspended the by-election schedule for all constituencies in Khyber Pakhtunkhwa.

== Candidates ==
Initially, the PTI decided to contest its chairman Imran Khan in every constituency. However, they later decided to change course and, in most constituencies, decided to field the MNA whose resignation was accepted.

The Pakistan Democratic Movement (PDM) has decided to not contest these by-elections as it believed them to be a waste of "funds, energy and time". Moreover, the Pakistan People's Party (PPP), the Muttahida Qaumi Movement – Pakistan (MQM-P), decided against participating in these elections, accepting suggestions from the PDM, their coalition partners in the federal government. The Awami National Party (ANP), another PDM ally, has only decided against contesting in constituencies in Khyber Pakhtunkhwa.
