= Shaheed Ahmed =

Pakistani Islamic scholar and politician

Maulana Shaheed Ahmed MNA

Member of the National Assembly of Pakistan
- In office 1988–1990
- In office 1993–1996
- Constituency: NA-10

Personal details
- Occupation: Islamic scholar, politician

Religious life
- Religion: Islam
- Denomination: Sunni

Maulana Shaheed Ahmed is a Pakistani Islamic scholar and politician who has twice been a member of the National Assembly of Pakistan from 30 November 1988 to 6 August 1990 and 15 October 1993 to 5 November 1996.
