= Muhammad Qasim (Mardan politician) =

Pakistani Islamic scholar and politician

Member of the National Assembly of Pakistan
- In office 2008–2013
- Constituency: NA-10 (Mardan-II)

Maulana Muhammad Qasim is a Pakistani politician who had been a member of the National Assembly of Pakistan from 2008 to 2013.

== Political career ==
He was elected to the National Assembly of Pakistan from Constituency NA-10 (Mardan-II) as a candidate of Muttahida Majlis-e-Amal (MMA) in the 2002 Pakistani general election. He received 69,726 votes and defeated Rahim Dad Khan, a candidate of Pakistan Peoples Party (PPP).

He was re-elected to the National Assembly from Constituency NA-10 (Mardan-II) as a candidate of MMA in the 2008 Pakistani general election. He received 29,279 votes and defeated Nawabzada Abdul Qadir Khan, a candidate of PPP.

He ran for the seat of the National Assembly from Constituency NA-10 (Mardan-II) as a candidate of Jamiat Ulema-e Islam (F) (JUI-F) in the 2013 Pakistani general election but was unsuccessful. He received 39,269 votes and lost the seat to Ali Muhammad Khan, a candidate of Pakistan Tehreek-e-Insaf (PTI).

He ran for the seat of the National Assembly from Constituency NA-22 (Mardan-III) as a candidate of MMA in the 2018 Pakistani general election but was unsuccessful. He received 56,318 votes and lost the seat to Ali Muhammad Khan, a candidate of PTI.

He ran for the seat of the National Assembly from Constituency NA-22 (Mardan-III) as a candidate of JUI-F in the 2022 Pakistan by-elections but was unsuccessful. He received 68,181 votes and lost the seat to Imran Khan, the chairman of PTI.
