= Muhammad Gohar Shah =

Pakistani politician

- محمد گوہرشاہ

Member of the National Assembly of Pakistan
- In office 1 June 2013 – 31 May 2018
- Constituency: NA-7 (Charsadda-I)
- In office 18 November 2002 – 18 November 2007
- Constituency: NA-7 (Charsadda-I)

Personal details
- Born: 1 January 1950 (age 76)
- Party: JIP (2025-present)
- Other political affiliations: JUI (F) (1988-2025)

Maulana Muhammad Gohar Shah (Urdu: مولانا محمد گوہر شاہ; born 1 January 1950) is a Pakistani politician who had been a member of the National Assembly of Pakistan, from June 2013 to May 2018. Previously he had been a member of the National Assembly from November 2002 to November 2007.

== Early life ==
He was born on 1 January 1950.

== Political career ==
He ran for the seat of the Provincial Assembly of Khyber Pakhtunkhwa as a candidate of Jamiat Ulema-e-Islam (F) (JUI-F) from Constituency PF-13 (Charsadda) in the 1988 Pakistani general election, but was unsuccessful. He received 7,773 votes and lost the seat to a candidate of Awami National Party (ANP).

He ran for the seat of the Provincial Assembly of Khyber Pakhtunkhwa as a candidate of JUI-F from Constituency PF-13 (Charsadda) in the 1990 Pakistani general election, but was unsuccessful. He received 12,457 votes and lost the seat to a candidate of ANP.

He ran for the seat of the Provincial Assembly of Khyber Pakhtunkhwa as a candidate of Islami Jamhoori Mahaz (IJM) from Constituency PF-13 (Charsadda) in the 1993 Pakistani general election, but was unsuccessful. He received 8.728 votes and lost the seat to a candidate of ANP.

Shah ran for the seat of National Assembly of Pakistan as a candidate of JUI-F from Constituency NA-5 (Charsadda) in the 1997 Pakistani general election, but was unsuccessful. He received 34,733 votes and lost the seat to Asfandyar Wali Khan.

Shah was elected to the National Assembly as a candidate of Muttahida Majlis-e-Amal (MMA) from Constituency NA-7 (Charsadda-I) in the 2002 Pakistani general election. He received 55,917 votes and defeated Asfandyar Wali Khan.

He ran for the seat of the Provincial Assembly of Khyber Pakhtunkhwa as a candidate of MMA from Constituency PK-20 (Charsadda-IV) in the 2008 Pakistani general election, but was unsuccessful. He secured 4,860 votes and lost the seat to Aftab Ahmad Khan Sherpao.

Shah was re-elected to the National Assembly as a candidate of JUI-F from Constituency NA-7 (Charsadda-I) in the 2013 Pakistani general election. He received 53,610 votes and defeated a candidate of Pakistan Tehreek-e-Insaf.

== See also ==
- List of Deobandis
