= PP-243 Bahawalnagar-VII =

Constituency of the Punjabi Provincial Legislature, Pakistan

- Constituency for the Provincial Assembly of Punjab
- Region: Chishtian Tehsil (partly) and Haroonabad Tehsil (partly) of Bahawalnagar District

Current constituency
- Created from: PP-282 Bahawalnagar-VI (2002-2018); PP-241 Bahawalnagar-V (2018-2023)

PP-243 Bahawalnagar-VII (پی پی-243، بہاولنگر-7) is a Constituency of Provincial Assembly of Punjab.

== General elections 2024 ==
Provincial election 2024: PP-243 Bahawalnagar-VII
Party	Candidate	Votes	%	±%
PML(N)	Zahid Akram	48,583	33.48	
Independent	Khadija Khanum (Note: Filed nomination papers as PTI candidate but ECP allowed him to run as an Independent)	46,349	31.94	
PML(Z)	Kashif Sana	34,005	23.44	
TLP	Muhammad Naseer Mohye Ud Din	9,533	6.57	
Independent	Khalid Farooq	4,816	3.32	
Others	Others (seven candidates)	1,815	1.25	
Turnout		149,151	57.91	
Total valid votes		145,101	97.28	
Rejected ballots		4,050	2.72	
Majority		2,234	1.54	
Registered electors		257,559		
hold				

== General elections 2018 ==
Provincial election 2018: PP-241 Bahawalnagar-V
Party	Candidate	Votes	%	±%
PML(N)	Kashif Mahmood	49,005	44.87	
PTI	Malik Muhammad Muzaffar Khan	44,737	40.96	
Independent	Muhammad Intazar	6,410	5.87	
TLP	Muhammad Athar	5,282	4.84	
Independent	Israr Ahmad Rana	1,798	1.65	
Others	Others (five candidates)	1,991	1.82	
Turnout		110,914	55.88	
Total valid votes		109,223	98.48	
Rejected ballots		1,691	1.52	
Majority		4,268	3.91	
Registered electors		198,477		

== General elections 2013 ==
Provincial election 2013: PP-282 Bahawalnagar-VI
Party	Candidate	Votes	%	±%
PML(N)	Choudhary Zahid Akram	36,993	37.40	
PML(Z)	Mian Abdul Wahid	23,895	24.16	
PTI	Muhammad Abdullah Wanse	21,240	21.47	
PPP	Sardar Muhammad Afzal Tatla	4,279	4.33	
Independent	Ata Ulla Nat	3,992	4.04	
Independent	Zulfiqar Ali Basra	3,016	3.05	
Independent	Zia Ur Rehman	1,432	1.45	
Others	Others (thirteen candidates)	4,064	4.11	
Turnout		102,315	63.67	
Total valid votes		98,911	96.67	
Rejected ballots		3,404	3.33	
Majority		13,098	13.24	
Registered electors		160,693		

== General elections 2008 ==
Contesting candidates	Party affiliation	Votes polled

== See also ==
- PP-242 Bahawalnagar-VI
- PP-244 Bahawalnagar-VIII
