= PP-244 Bahawalnagar-VIII =

Constituency of the Punjabi Provincial Legislature, Pakistan

- Constituency for the Provincial Assembly of Punjab
- Region: Chishtian Tehsil (partly) including Chishtian city of Bahawalnagar District

Current constituency
- Created from: PP-281 Bahawalnagar-V (2002-2018); PP-244 Bahawalnagar-VIII (2018-)

PP-244 Bahawalnagar-VIII (پی پی-244، بہاولنگر-8) is a Constituency of Provincial Assembly of Punjab.

== General elections 2024 ==
Provincial election 2024: PP-244 Bahawalnagar-VIII
| Party | Candidate | Votes | % | ±% |
|---|---|---|---|---|
| Independent | Suryia Sultana (Note: Filed nomination papers as PTI candidate but ECP allowed him to run as an Independent) | 50,725 | 38.93 | |
| PML(N) | Mian Abdul Majeed Jatala | 49,470 | 37.97 | |
| Independent | Muhammad Khizar Hayat | 9,908 | 7.60 | |
| PPP | Muhammad Intazar | 7,630 | 5.86 | |
| TLP | Ghulam Qadir | 6,583 | 5.05 | |
| Independent | Mariam Tahir | 3,936 | 3.02 | |
| Others | Others (fourteen candidates) | 2,051 | 1.57 | |
| Turnout | | 132,915 | 54.27 | |
| Total valid votes | | 130,303 | 98.03 | |
| Rejected ballots | | 2,612 | 1.97 | |
| Majority | | 755 | 0.96 | |
| Registered electors | | 244,913 | | |
| hold | | | | |

== General elections 2018 ==
Provincial election 2018: PP-244 Bahawalnagar-VIII
| Party | Candidate | Votes | % | ±% |
|---|---|---|---|---|
| PML(N) | Muhammad Arshad | 40,163 | 34.28 | |
| Independent | Kashif Naveed | 31,485 | 26.87 | |
| PML(Z) | Muhammad Noman Javed | 30,212 | 25.79 | |
| TLP | Khalid Naeem | 7,701 | 6.57 | |
| Independent | Muhammad Amir Wattoo | 6,286 | 5.37 | |
| Others | Others (eleven candidates) | 1,319 | 1.12 | |
| Turnout | | 119,970 | 60.85 | |
| Total valid votes | | 117,166 | 97.66 | |
| Rejected ballots | | 2,804 | 2.34 | |
| Majority | | 8,678 | 7.41 | |
| Registered electors | | 197,163 | | |

== General elections 2013 ==
Provincial election 2013: PP-281 Bahawalnagar-V
| Party | Candidate | Votes | % | ±% |
|---|---|---|---|---|
| PML(N) | Ihsan Ul Haq Bajwa | 36,704 | 38.98 | |
| PTI | Sikandar Fayyaz Bhadera | 20,222 | 21.48 | |
| Independent | Choudhary Muhammad Asghar | 14,334 | 15.22 | |
| PML(Z) | Choudhary Imam Faisal | 7,820 | 8.31 | |
| PPP | Pir Muhammad Farooq Chishty | 6,341 | 6.73 | |
| PML(F) | Karam Khan Lakhwera | 5,761 | 6.12 | |
| Others | Others (twenty candidates) | 2,968 | 3.15 | |
| Turnout | | 97,696 | 59.79 | |
| Total valid votes | | 94,150 | 96.37 | |
| Rejected ballots | | 3,546 | 3.63 | |
| Majority | | 16,482 | 17.50 | |
| Registered electors | | 163,392 | | |

== General elections 2008 ==
| Contesting candidates | Party affiliation | Votes polled |

== See also ==
- PP-243 Bahawalnagar-VII
- PP-245 Bahawalpur-I
