= Rahmanullah Khan =

Pakistani politician

Haji Rahmanullah khan MNA

Member of the National Assembly of Pakistan
- Constituency: NA-8 Swabi
- In office 1990–1993
- In office 1997–1999

Personal details
- Born: 1941 Karnal Sher Kallay
- Died: 14 May 2015 (aged 73–74)
- Party: Awami National Party (ANP)
- Occupation: Politician

Haji Rahmanullah Khan (1941 – 14 May 2015) was a Pakistani politician from the Swabi District who had been a member of the National Assembly of Pakistan from 1990 to 1993 and 1997 to 1999.
