= PP-241 Bahawalnagar-V =

Constituency of the Punjabi Provincial Legislature, Pakistan

- Constituency for the Provincial Assembly of Punjab
- Region: Haroonabad Tehsil (partly) including Haroonabad city of Bahawalnagar District

Current constituency
- Created from: PP-283 Bahawalnagar-VII (2002-2018); PP-244 Bahawalnagar-VIII (2018-2023)

PP-241 Bahawalnagar-V (پی پی-241، بہاولنگر-5) is a Constituency of Provincial Assembly of Punjab.

== General elections 2024 ==
Provincial election 2024: PP-241 Bahawalnagar-V
Party	Candidate	Votes	%	±%
PML(Z)	Ghulam Murtaza	58,436	42.82	
PML(N)	Chaudhry Mazhar Iqbal	35,166	25.77	
Independent	Chaudhry Azam Ali Athar (Note: Filed nomination papers as PTI candidate but ECP allowed him to run as an Independent)	28,523	20.90	
TLP	Muhammad Rehan Rasheed	6,126	4.49	
Independent	Mushtaq Ahmad Shahzad	2,203	1.61	
Others	Others (thirteen candidates)	6,108	4.41	
Turnout		139,158	57.28	
Total valid votes		136,472	98.07	
Rejected ballots		2,686	1.93	
Majority		23,270	17.05	
Registered electors		242,928		
hold				

== General elections 2018 ==
Provincial election 2018: PP-244 Bahawalnagar-VIII
Party	Candidate	Votes	%	±%
PML(N)	Muhammad Arshad	40,163	34.28	
Independent	Kashif Naveed	31,485	26.87	
PML(Z)	Muhammad Noman Javed	30,212	25.79	
TLP	Khalid Naeem	7,701	6.57	
Independent	Muhammad Amir Wattoo	6,286	5.37	
Others	Others (eleven candidates)	1,319	1.12	
Turnout		119,970	60.85	
Total valid votes		117,166	97.66	
Rejected ballots		2,804	2.34	
Majority		8,678	7.41	
Registered electors		197,163		

== General elections 2013 ==
Provincial election 2013: PP-283 Bahawalnagar-VII
Party	Candidate	Votes	%	±%
PML(Z)	Ch. Ghulam Murtaza	43,337	40.12	
PML(N)	Ashraf Ul Islam	34,989	32.39	
PPP	Shoket Mehmood Basra	11,525	10.67	
Independent	Azmat Ali Kamboh	5,404	5.00	
MDM	Rehan Mahmood Zia	4,753	4.40	
PTI	Madiha Ahsan Bari	4,039	3.74	
Independent	Ch.Muhammad Saeed	1,252	1.16	
Others	Others (seventeen candidates)	2,709	2.51	
Turnout		110,842	64.92	
Total valid votes		108,008	97.44	
Rejected ballots		2,834	2.56	
Majority		8,348	7.73	
Registered electors		170,744		

== General elections 2008 ==
Contesting candidates	Party affiliation	Votes polled

== See also ==
- PP-240 Bahawalnagar-IV
- PP-242 Bahawalnagar-VI
