= NA-25 Charsadda-II =

Constituency of the National Assembly of Pakistan

- Constituency for the National Assembly of Pakistan
- Region: Charsadda Tehsil of Charsadda District
- Electorate: 562,398

Current constituency
- Party: Pakistan Tehreek-e-Insaf
- Member: Fazal Muhammad Khan
- Created from: NA-24 Charsadda-II

NA-25 Charsadda-II (این اے-25، چارسدہ-٢) is a constituency for the National Assembly of Pakistan. The constituency was formerly known as NA-7 (Charsadda-I) from 1977 to 2018. The name changed to NA-24 (Charsadda-II) after the delimitation in 2018 and to NA-25 (Charsadda-II) after the delimitation in 2022.

== Members of Parliament ==
=== 1977–2002: NA-7 Charsadda-I ===
Election	Member	Party
1977	M. Yousaf Khan	PNA
1985	Maulana Gauhar Rehman	Independent
1988	Maulana M. Ahmed	JUI-F
1990	Haji Sarfaraz Khan Hatihan	PDA
1993	Haji M. Yaqoob	PPP
1997	M. Azam Khan	ANP

=== 2002–2018: NA-7 Charsadda-I ===
Election	Member	Party
2002	Maulana Muhammad Gohar Shah	MMA
2008	Asfandiyar Wali Khan	ANP
2013	Maulana Muhammad Gohar Shah	JUI-F

=== 2018–2022: NA-24 Charsadda-II ===
Election	Member	Party
2018	Fazal Muhammad Khan	PTI

=== 2023–present: NA-25 Charsadda-II ===
Election	Member	Party
2024	Fazal Muhammad Khan	SIC

== Elections since 2002 ==
=== 2002 general election ===
2002 General Election: NA-7 (Charsadda-I)
Party	Candidate	Votes	%	±%
MMA	Maulana Muhammad Gohar Shah	55,917	64.07	
ANP	Asfandyar Wali Khan	31,364	35.93	
Majority		24,553	28.14	
Turnout		87,281	36.92	
MMA gain from ANP				

A total of 2,099 votes were rejected.

=== 2008 general election ===
2008 General Election: NA-7 (Charsadda-I)
Party	Candidate	Votes	%	±%
ANP	Asfandyar Wali Khan	57,234	65.34	+29.41
PPPP	Naseer Mohammed Khan	17,883	20.42	
PPP (S)	Alamzaib Umerzai	8,882	10.14	
PML-N	Kalim Akbar	3,588	4.10	
Majority		39,351	44.92	
Turnout		87,587	32.32	−4.60
ANP gain from MMA				

A total of 2,212 votes were rejected.

=== 2013 general election ===
2013 General Election: NA-7 (Charsadda-I)
Party	Candidate	Votes	%	±%
JUI-F	Maulana Muhammad Gohar Shah	53,610	31.69	
PTI	Fazal Muhammad Khan	40,254	23.80	
ANP	Asfandyar Wali Khan	38,264	22.62	−42.72
JI	Muhammad Arshad Khan	22,664	13.40	
PPPP	Khanim Ullah	6,856	4.05	−16.37
PML-N	Kaleem Akbar Durrani	10002	10.8	10.02
Independent	Noor Zeb	1,884	1.11	
MDM	Ishtiaq Ahmad	1,032	0.61	
Independent	Omar Shahzad	574	0.34	
APML	Nadir Khan	503	0.30	
QWP (S)	Sikandar Hayat Khan	2	0.00	
Majority		13,356	7.89	
Turnout		169,170	46.22	+13.90
JUI-F gain from ANP				

A total of 5,113 votes were rejected.

=== 2018 general election ===
General elections were held on 25 July 2018.

General election 2018: NA-24 (Charsadda-II)
Party	Candidate	Votes	%	±%
PTI	Fazal Muhammad Khan	83,495	41.32	
ANP	Asfandyar Wali Khan	59,483	29.44	
MMA	Maulana Muhammad Gohar Shah	38,252	18.93	
Others	Others (five candidates)	20,843	10.31	
Turnout		209,905	45.29	
Total valid votes		202,073	96.27	
Rejected ballots		7,832	3.73	
Majority		24,012	11.88	
Registered electors		463,440		
PTI gain from JUI (F)				

=== 2022 by-election ===
A by-election was held on 16 October 2022 due to the resignation of Fazal Muhammad Khan, the previous MNA from this seat.

By-election 2022: NA-24 (Charsadda-II)
Party	Candidate	Votes	%	±%
PTI	Imran Khan	78,589	50.64	▲9.32
ANP	Aimal Wali Khan	68,356	44.05	▲14.61
JI	Mujeeb-ur-Rehman	7,883	5.08	N/A^{†}
Independent	Sparlay Mohmand	349	0.22	
Turnout		157,767	29.02	▼16.27
Rejected ballots		2,590	1.64	▼2.09
Majority		10,233	6.59	▼5.29
Registered electors		526,682		
PTI hold				

^{†}JI previously contested as part of MMA. JUI-F, who also previously contested as part of MMA, did not contest this election.

=== 2024 general election ===
General elections were held on 8 February 2024. Fazal Muhammad Khan won the election with 100,742 votes.

General election 2024: NA-25 Charsadda-II
Party	Candidate	Votes	%	±%
Independent	Fazal Muhammad Khan (Note: Filed nomination papers as PTI candidate but ECP allowed him to run as an Independent)	100,742	45.93	▼4.71
ANP	Aimal Wali Khan	68,019	31.01	▼13.04
JUI (F)	Muhammad Gohar Shah	32,933	15.02	N/A
JI	Musawer Shah Durrani	8,487	3.87	▼1.21
Others	Others (nine candidates)	9,139	4.17	
Turnout		224,772	39.97	▲10.95
Rejected ballots		5,452	2.43	▲0.79
Majority		32,723	14.92	▲8.33
Registered electors		562,398		

== See also ==
- NA-24 Charsadda-I
- NA-26 Mohmand
