= Sardar Ahmad =

Pakistani politician

Member of the Provincial Assembly of Sindh
- In office 29 May 2013 – 28 May 2018

Personal details
- Born: 9 November 1933 (age 92) Ajmer, India
- Other political affiliations: Mutahida Quami Movement (until 2018)

Sardar Ahmad is a Pakistani politician who was a member of the Provincial Assembly of Sindh from May 2013 to May 2018.

== Early life and education ==
He was born on 9 November 1933 in Ajmer, India.

He has a degree of Bachelor of Arts and a degree of Master of Arts from Sindh University.

== Political career ==
He was elected to the Provincial Assembly of Sindh as a candidate of Mutahida Quami Movement from Constituency PS-124 KARACHI-XXXVI in the 2013 Pakistani general election.
