= Fakhar Zaman Khan =

Pakistani politician

Member of the National Assembly of Pakistan
- In office 19 February 2021 – 29 July 2022
- Constituency: NA-45 (Tribal Area-VI)

Personal details
- Party: Pakistan Tehreek-e-Insaf (2021-present)

Malak Fakhar Zaman Khan Bangash (Urdu: فخر زمان خان) is a Pakistani politician who had been a member of the National Assembly of Pakistan from February 2021 till July 2022.

== Political career ==
He was elected to the National Assembly of Pakistan as a candidate of Pakistan Tehreek-e-Insaf from Constituency NA-45 (Tribal Area-VI) in a 2021 by-election in the Constituency.

== See also ==
- List of members of the 15th National Assembly of Pakistan
