= NA-23 Mardan-III =

Constituency of the National Assembly of Pakistan

- Constituency for the National Assembly of Pakistan
- Region: Takht Bhai Tehsil (partly) and Mardan Tehsil (partly) of Mardan District
- Electorate: 471,184

Current constituency
- Party: Sunni Ittehad Council
- Member: Ali Muhammad Khan
- Created from: NA-22 (Mardan-III)

NA-23 Mardan-III (این اے-23، مردان-3) is a constituency for the National Assembly of Pakistan. The constituency was formerly known as NA-10 (Mardan-II) from 1977 to 2018. The name changed to NA-22 (Mardan-III) after the delimitation in 2018 and to NA-23 (Mardan-III) after the delimitation in 2022.

== Members of Parliament ==
=== 1977–2002: NA-10 Mardan-II ===
Election	Member	Party
1977	Maulana Habib Gul	PNA
1985	Haji Nadir Shah	Independent
1988	Maulana Shaheed Ahmed	JUI (DG)
1990	M. Aslam Khan Khattak	IND
1993	Maulana Shaheed Ahmed	MDM
1997	Shams-ur-Rehamn Qasim	ANP

=== 2002–2018: NA-9 Mardan-II ===
Election	Member	Party
2002	Maulana Muhammad Qasim	MMA
2008	Maulana Muhammad Qasim	MMA
2013	Ali Muhammad Khan	PTI

=== 2018–2022: NA-22 Mardan-III ===
Election	Member	Party
2018	Ali Muhammad Khan	PTI

=== 2023–present: NA-23 Mardan-III ===
Election	Member	Party
2024	Ali Muhammad Khan	SIC

== Elections since 2002 ==
=== 2002 general election ===
2002 General Election: NA-10 (Mardan-II)
Party	Candidate	Votes	%	±%
MMA	Maulana Muhammad Qasim	69,726	79.51	
PPPP	Rahim Dad Khan	14,541	16.58	
PML-Q	Sher Muhammad Khan	2,858	3.26	
Independent	Jehanzeb Salik	566	0.65	
Majority		55,185	62.93	
Turnout		87,691	39.95	
MMA gain from ANP				

A total of 1,713 votes were rejected.

=== 2008 general election ===
2008 General Election: NA-10 (Mardan-II)
Party	Candidate	Votes	%	±%
MMA	Maulana Mohammad Qasim	29,279	31.17	−48.34
PPPP	Nawabzada Abdul Qadir Khan	23,138	24.63	+8.05
ANP	Mohammed Farooq Khan	21,115	22.48	
PML	Naseem Muhammad Khan	6,774	7.21	
PPP (S)	Jalal Khan Khattak	6,012	6.40	
PML-N	Muhammad Shoaib Khan	3,782	4.03	
Independent	Atta Ullah	1,898	2.02	
Awami Himayat Tehreek	Tahir Iqbal	1,732	1.84	
MQM	Zair Ullah Khan	201	0.22	
Majority		6,141	6.54	
Turnout		93,931	37.76	−2.19
MMA hold		Swing		

A total of 2,928 votes were rejected.

=== 2013 general election ===
2013 General Election: NA-10 (Mardan-II)
Party	Candidate	Votes	%	±%
PTI	Ali Muhammad Khan	46,531	29.55	
JUI-F	Maulana Muhammad Qasim	39,269	24.94	
ANP	Muhammad Farooq Khan	19,436	12.34	
JI	Sultan Muhammad	19,107	12.13	
PPPP	Nawabzada Abdul Qadir Khan	15,345	9.75	−14.88
PML-N	Naseem Muhammad Khan	11,491	7.30	+3.27
JUP-N	Muhammad Fayaz	3,426	2.18	
Tehreek-e-Pasmanada Awam	Abdul Ghaffar Khan Mohmand	1,638	1.04	
TTP	Qazi Aslam Khan	724	0.46	
MQM	Maulana Noor ul Haq	170	0.11	−0.11
PML	Zardali Khan	166	0.10	−7.11
APML	Yar Badshah	160	0.10	
Majority		7,262	4.61	
Turnout		157,463	51.00	+13.24
PTI gain from MMA				

A total of 4,834 votes were rejected.

=== 2018 general election ===
General elections were held on 25 July 2018.

General election 2018: NA-22 (Mardan-III)
Party	Candidate	Votes	%	±%
PTI	Ali Muhammad Khan	58,577	29.13	▼0.42
MMA	Maulana Muhammad Qasim	56,318	28.01	▼9.06^{†}
PML(N)	Jamshid Khan	36,625	18.22	▲10.92
ANP	Malak Amaan Khan	27,104	13.48	▲1.14
Others	Others (three candidates)	16,839	8.38	
Turnout		201,057	51.59	▲0.59
Rejected ballots		5,594	2.78	
Majority		2,259	1.12	
Registered electors		389,688		
PTI hold		Swing	N/A	

^{†}JUI-F, and JI contested as part of MMA

=== 2022 by-election ===
A by-election was held on 16 October 2022 due to the resignation of Ali Muhammad Khan, the previous MNA from this seat.

By-election 2022: NA-22 (Mardan-III)
Party	Candidate	Votes	%	±%
PTI	Imran Khan	76,681	50.01	▲20.88
JUI (F)	Maulana Muhammad Qasim	68,181	44.46	N/A^{†}
JI	Abdul Wasi	8,239	5.37	N/A^{†}
Independent	Muhammad Sarwar	243	0.16	
Turnout		155,208	32.94	▼18.65
Rejected ballots		1,864	1.20	▼1.58
Majority		8,500	5.54	▲4.42
Registered electors		471,184		
PTI hold				

^{†}JUI-F, and JI previously contested jointly as part of MMA

=== 2024 general election ===
General elections were held on 8 February 2024. Ali Muhammad Khan won the election with 102,188 votes.

General election 2024: NA-23 Mardan-III
Party	Candidate	Votes	%	±%
PTI	Ali Muhammad Khan (Note: Filed nomination papers as PTI candidate but ECP allowed him to run as an Independent)	102,188	51.59	▲1.58
ANP	Ahmad Khan	33,922	17.13	N/A
JUI (F)	Kareem Ullah Khan	32,659	16.49	▼27.97
Others	Others (eight candidates)	29,302	14.79	
Turnout		203,177	44.35	▲11.41
Rejected ballots		5,106	2.51	
Majority		68,266	34.47	▲28.93
Registered electors		458,114		

== See also ==
- NA-22 Mardan-II
- NA-24 Charsadda-I
