= 2008 Sindh provincial election =

Pakistani provincial election

- 18 February 2008

All 168 seats in the Sindh Assembly 85 seats needed for a majority
- Turnout: 44.57
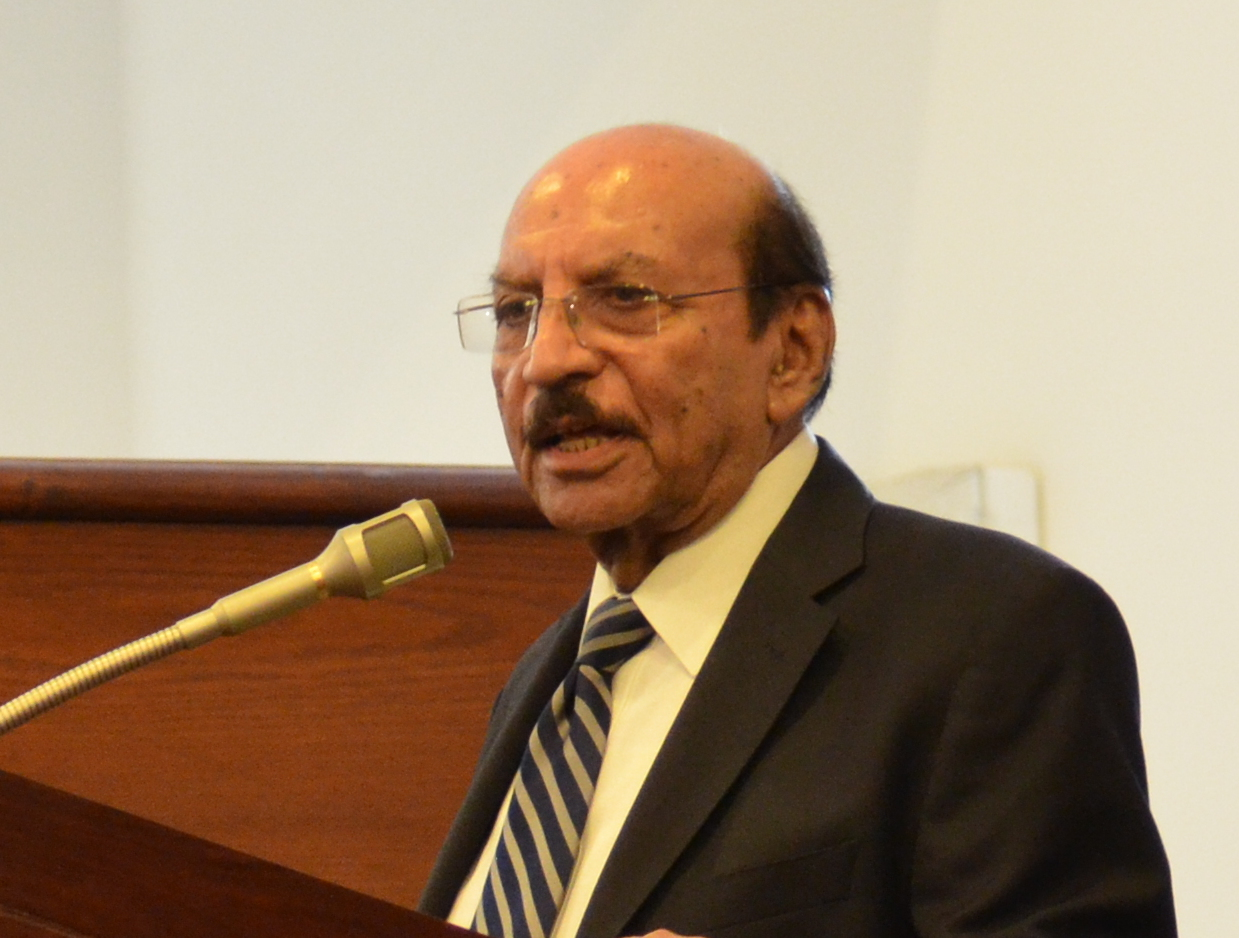

	First party	Second party	Third party
Leader	Syed Qaim Ali Shah	Sardar Ahmad	Arbab Ghulam Rahim
Party	PPP	MQM-L	PML-Q
Leader's seat	Khairpur-I	Karachi-XXVIII	Tharparkar-I
Last election	67 seats	41 seats	15 seats
Seats won	91	51	12
Seat change	▲24	▲10	▼3
Popular vote	3,597,275	2,592,505	1,098,754
Percentage	42.26%	30.46%	12.91%
Swing	▲7.22%	▲15.58%	▲3.91%
- Map of Sindh showing Assembly Constituencies and winning Parties
Chief Minister before election
Arbab Ghulam Rahim
PML(Q)
Elected Chief Minister
Syed Qaim Ali Shah
PPP

Provincial elections were held in the Pakistani province of Sindh to elect the members of the 11th Provincial Assembly of Sindh on 18 February 2008, alongside nationwide general elections and three other provincial elections in North-West Frontier Province, Balochistan and Punjab. The remaining two territories of Pakistan, AJK and Gilgit-Baltistan, were ineligible to vote due to their disputed status.

== Result ==
92	51	13	8	2	2
PPP	MQM	PML(Q)	PML(F)	NPP	ANP

=== Result by Party ===
Party	Popular vote			Seats					
Party	Popular vote			General		Reserved		Total	+/−
Party	Votes	%	±pp	Contested	Won	Women	Non-Muslims	Total	+/−
Pakistan People's Party	3,597,275	42.26	▲7.22	130	71	16	5	92	▲25
Muttahida Qaumi Movement	2,592,505	30.46	▲15.58	122	39	9	3	51	▲11
Pakistan Muslim League (Q)	1,098,754	12.91	▲3.91	59	10	2	1	13	▼5
Pakistan Muslim League (F)	533,385	6.27	▼1.17	22	6	2		8	▼4
National Peoples Party	174,848	2.05	New entry	9	2			2	▲2
Awami National Party	69,138	0.81	New entry	15	2			2	▲2
Independents & Others	446,452	5.24	Steady						
Total	8,511,144	100%			130	29	9	168	
Valid votes	8,511,144	97.90							
Invalid votes	182,208	2.10							
Votes cast/ turnout	8,693,352	44.57							
Abstentions	10,813,121	55.43							
Registered voters	19,506,473								
(FAFEN)

=== District-wise results ===
District	Total seats	PPP	MQM	PML(Q)	PML(F)	NPP	ANP
Sukkur	4	4	0	0	0	0	0
Ghotki	4	3	0	0	1	0	0
Shikarpur	4	2	0	1	0	1	0
Jacobabad	3	3	0	0	0	0	0
Kashmore	3	1	0	2	0	0	0
Naushahro Feroz	5	4	0	0	0	1	0
Nawabshah	5	5	0	0	0	0	0
Khairpur	6	4	0	0	2	0	0
Larkana	4	4	0	0	0	0	0
Qambar Shahdadkot	4	4	0	0	0	0	0
Matiari	2	2	0	0	0	0	0
Hyderabad	6	2	4	0	0	0	0
Tando Allahyar	2	2	0	0	0	0	0
Tando Muhammad Khan	2	2	0	0	0	0	0
Badin	5	5	0	0	0	0	0
Tharparkar	4	0	0	4	0	0	0
Mirpur Khas	4	3	1	0	0	0	0
Umerkot	3	3	0	0	0	0	0
Jamshoro	3	3	0	0	0	0	0
Dadu	4	4	0	0	0	0	0
Sanghar	6	2	0	1	3	0	0
Thatta	5	3	0	2	0	0	0
Karachi	42	6	34	0	0	0	2
Total	130	71	39	10	6	2	2
