= Ali Muhammad Khan =

Pakistani politician

- علی محمد خان
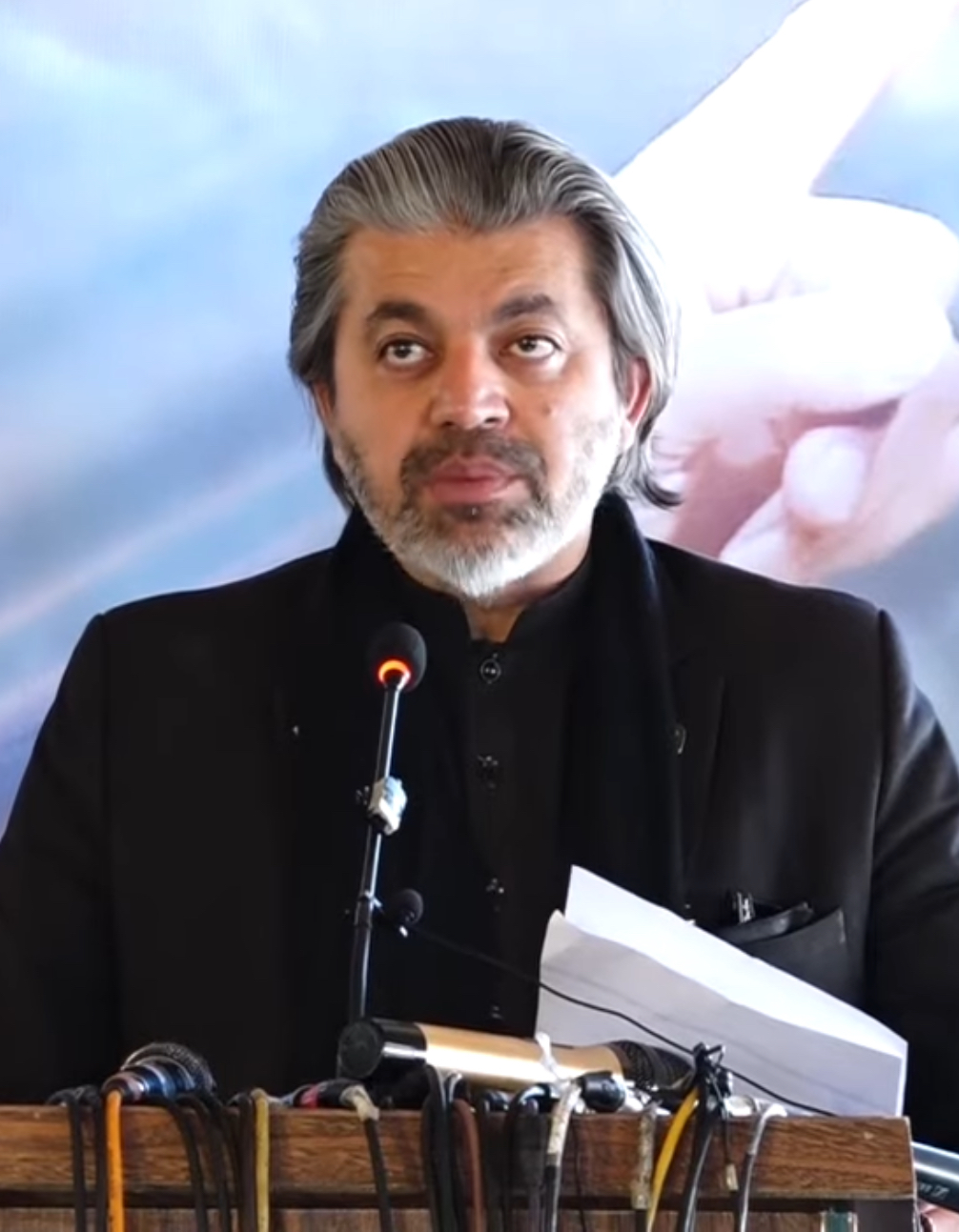
- Khan in 2024

Minister of State for Parliamentary Affairs
- In office 17 September 2018 – 10 April 2022
- President: Arif Alvi
- Prime Minister: Imran Khan
- Minister: Babar Awan

Head of Prime Minister's Public Affairs and Grievances Wing
- In office 17 September 2018 – 10 April 2022

Member of the National Assembly of Pakistan
- Incumbent
- Assumed office 29 February 2024
- Preceded by: Imran Khan
- Constituency: NA-23 Mardan-III
- In office 13 August 2018 – 29 July 2022
- Succeeded by: Imran Khan
- Constituency: NA-22 (Mardan-III)
- In office 1 June 2013 – 31 May 2018
- Preceded by: Moulana Mohammad Qasim
- Constituency: NA-10 (Mardan-II)

Personal details
- Born: 30 November 1979 (age 46) Mardan, Khyber Pakhtunkhwa, Pakistan
- Party: PTI (2013-present)

Ali Muhammad Khan (Urdu: علی محمد خان; born 30 November 1979) is a Pakistani politician who served as the Minister of State for Parliamentary Affairs from 17 September 2018 to 10 April 2022. He is currently a member of the National Assembly of Pakistan since February 2024. He previously served as a member from August 2018 till July 2022.

== Early life and education ==
Khan was born on 30 November 1979in a Pashtun family in Mardan, Khyber Pakhtunkhwa.

His grandfather Khan Pir Muhammad Khan was a Pakistan Movement activist close to Muhammad Ali Jinnah, and in 1940 he led the caravans from Mardan to attend the Lahore Resolution. He also served as a federal minister twice, but after him the family more or less stopped being involved in national politics.

Khan earned his LLB degree from the Universal College Islamabad (UCI), enrolling there after being advised by Barrister Masroor Shah, a senior lawyer of the Supreme Court.

He is also a civil engineer by profession.

== Political career ==
He was elected to the National Assembly of Pakistan as a candidate of PTI from Constituency NA-10 (Mardan-II) in the 2013 Pakistani general election. He received 46,531 votes and defeated a candidate of JUI-F.

He was re-elected to the National Assembly as a candidate of PTI from the Constituency NA-22 (Mardan-III) in the 2018 Pakistani general election. He received 58,577 votes and defeated Moulana Mohammad Qasim.

On 17 September 2018, he was inducted into the federal cabinet of Prime Minister Imran Khan as Minister of State for Parliamentary Affairs. While serving as a minister, he presented a resolution to the National Assembly of Pakistan demanding the public hanging of child rapists and abusers, though this resolution drew criticism as a human rights violation to the criminals by opposition lawmakers and Amnesty International. The resolution was passed though some government politicians including Shireen Mazari and Fawad Chaudhry opposed it.

On 11 May 2023, he was arrested by Pakistani authorities under the Maintenance of Public Order (MPO) law due to his alleged involvement and incitement in the 2023 Pakistani protests. After securing bail and getting re-arrested eight different times, and spending 78 days in jail, on 27 July, he was released after the Peshawar High Court (PHC) had intervened to grant him bail.

He was elected as a member of the National Assembly of Pakistan for the third time in the 2024 Pakistani general election from NA-23 Mardan-III as a PTI-backed Independent candidate. He won the seat and received 102,188 votes while the runner-up, Ahmad Khan of ANP received 32,655 votes. As a Member of the National Assembly (MNA) he criticized the government of Shehbaz Sharif and authorities for abducting top PTI members.

== Controversies ==
=== Violence against police ===
In 2014, a police case was registered against Khan after he stormed a police station which caused injuries to three policemen.

=== Threat against secularists ===
In 2017, Khan asserted that those who want to secularize Pakistan should "mend their ways or leave the country", as for him Pakistan was always meant to be an Islamic state.
