= 2008 North-West Frontier Province provincial election =

Pakistani provincial election

- 18 February 2008

All 124 seats in the Provincial Assembly 63 seats needed for a majority

	First party	Second party	Third party
Leader	Ameer Haider Khan Hoti	Rahim Dad Khan	Akram Khan Durrani
Party	ANP	PPP	MMA
Leader's seat	Mardan-I	Mardan-V	Bannu-IV
Last election	8 seats	8 seats	48 seats
Seats won	32	17	10
Seat change	▲24	▲9	▼38
Popular vote	578,405	563,057	500,479
Percentage	16.94%	16.49%	14.66%
Swing	▲5.39%	▲7.15%	▼12.73%
- Results of the Election by constituency
Chief Minister before election
Akram Khan Durrani
MMA
Elected Chief Minister
Ameer Haider Khan Hoti
ANP

Provincial elections were held in the North-West Frontier Province to elect the members of the 9th Provincial Assembly of North-West Frontier Province on 18 February 2008, alongside nationwide general elections and three other provincial elections in Sindh, Balochistan, and Punjab. The remaining two territories of Pakistan, AJK and Gilgit-Baltistan, were ineligible to vote due to their disputed status. These were the last elections held under the provincial name "North-West Frontier Province", later changed to Khyber Pakhtunkhwa following the Eighteenth Amendment to the Constitution of Pakistan.

The elections resulted in a hung parliament with the Awami National Party (ANP) being the largest party. The ANP was able to form a coalition government with the Pakistan People's Party (PPP) after winning reserved seats for women and non-Muslims, and their candidate for the Chief Minister position, Haider Khan Hoti, was elected unopposed.

== Results ==
Party	Votes	%	Seats		
Party	Votes	%	General	Reserved for women	Reserved for non-Muslims
Awami National Party	578,405	16.94	31	9	1
Pakistan Peoples Party	563,057	16.49	17	6	1
Muttahida Majlis-e-Amal	500,479	14.66	10	3	1
Pakistan Muslim League (Q)	440,518	12.90	5	1	0
Pakistan Muslim League (N)	277,559	8.13	5	2	0
Pakistan Peoples Party (S)	215,474	6.31	6	1	0
Other parties	10,373	0.30	0	0	0
Independents	828,317	24.26	22	0	0
Election postponed			3	–	–
Total	3,414,182	100.00	99	22	3
Source: Free and Fair Election Network (FAFEN)

== Aftermath ==
The Awami National Party (ANP) and the Pakistan People's Party (PPP) emerged as the two largest parties in the assembly and therefore, they jointly formed a coalition government in the province. The ANP's Haider Khan Hoti was elected unopposed as the Chief Minister of the North-West Frontier Province, due to no other party fielding a candidate for the chief ministerial election. Furthermore, Kiramat Ullah Khan of the PPP and Khush Dil Khan of the ANP were elected as the Speaker and Deputy Speaker, respectively. Moreover, on 5 May 2008, former Chief Minister Akram Khan Durrani of Muttahida Majlis-e-Amal (MMA) became the Leader of the Opposition.
