= NA-45 (Kurram-I) =

Constituency of the National Assembly of Pakistan

NA-45 (Tribal Area-VI)
- Constituency for the National Assembly of Pakistan
- Region: Kurram District
- Electorate: 198,618

Current constituency
- Created from: NA-38 (Tribal Area-III)

NA-45 (Tribal Area-VI) (Urdu: این اے-۳۸، قباَئلی علاقہ-۳) is a constituency for the National Assembly of Pakistan comprising mainly Lower Kurram Subdivision and Central Kurram Subdivision of Kurram District in Khyber Pakhtunkhwa province.

== Members of Parliament ==
=== 2002–2018: NA-38 (Tribal Area-III) ===
Election	Member	Party
2002	Munir Khan Orakzai	Independent
2008	Munir Khan Orakzai	Independent
2013	No Elections	

=== Since 2018: NA-45 (Tribal Area-VI) ===
Election	Member	Party
2018	Munir Khan Orakzai	MMA
2021	Fakhar Zaman Khan	PTI
2022	Imran Khan	PTI

== Election 2002 ==
General elections were held on 10 Oct 2002. Munir Khan Orakzai an independent candidate won by 6,619 votes.

== Election 2008 ==
The result of general election 2008 in this constituency is given below.

=== Result ===
Munir Khan Orakzai succeeded in the election 2008 and became the member of National Assembly.

General Election 2008: Tribal Area-III
Party	Candidate	Votes	%
Independent	Munir Khan Orakzai	16,525	67
Independent	Maulana Akhunzada Obaidullah Sharif	4,270	17
Independent	Habib Malik Orakzai	2,990	12
Others	Others	1,115	4

== Election 2013 ==
Due to the volatile security situation in the region the elections were not held for this constituency.

== Election 2018 ==
General elections were held on 25 July 2018.

General election 2018: NA-45 (Tribal Area-VI)
Party	Candidate	Votes	%	±%
MMA	Munir Khan Orakzai	16,353	29.02	
PTI	Said Jamal	13,601	24.13	
Independent	Fakhar Zaman Khan	11,370	20.17	
Independent	Malak Rasheed Ahmed Khan	6,653	11.81	
PPP	Arif Hussain	3,534	6.27	
Others	Others (thirty-four candidates)	4,846	8.60	
Turnout		57,893	35.01	
Total valid votes		56,357	97.35	
Rejected ballots		1,536	2.65	
Majority		2,752	4.89	
Registered electors		165,368		

== By-election 2021 ==
The seat of NA-45 fell vacant after the demise of the JUI-F MNA Munir Khan Orakzai. This seat was won by PTI candidate Fakhar Zaman Khan in a February 2021 by-election.

By-election 2021: NA-45 (Kurram-I)
Party	Candidate	Votes	%	±%
PTI	Fakhar Zaman Khan	16,911	29.75	▲5.72
JUI (F)	Jamil Khan Chamkani	15,761	27.73	▼1.20
Independent	Said Jamal Orakzai	15,559	27.37	
Independent	Azram Khan	5,222	9.19	
Others	Others (twenty-three candidates)	3,394	5.97	
Turnout		58,663	32.42	
Rejected ballots		1,816	3.10	
Majority		1,150	2.02	
Registered electors		180,931		
PTI gain from MMA				

== By-election 2022 ==
A by-election was held on 30 October 2022 due to the resignation of Fakhar Zaman Khan, the previous MNA from this seat.

By-election 2022: NA-45 (Kurram-I)
Party	Candidate	Votes	%	±%
PTI	Imran Khan	20,748	58.42	▲28.57
JUI (F)	Jamil Khan Chamkhani	12,718	35.81	▲8.08
Others	Others (fourteen candidates)	2,050	5.77	
Turnout		36,676	18.47	▼13.95
Rejected ballots		1,160	3.16	▲0.06
Majority		8,030	22.61	▲20.59
Registered electors		198,618		
PTI hold				

== See also ==
- NA-44 (Tribal Area-V)
- NA-46 (Tribal Area-VII)
