= 2008 Punjab provincial election =

Election in Pakistan

- 18 February 2008

297 out of 371 seats in the Punjab Assembly (Note: 66 seats are reserved for women and 8 are reserved for non-Muslims filled through PR) 186 seats needed for a majority
- Turnout: 47.73
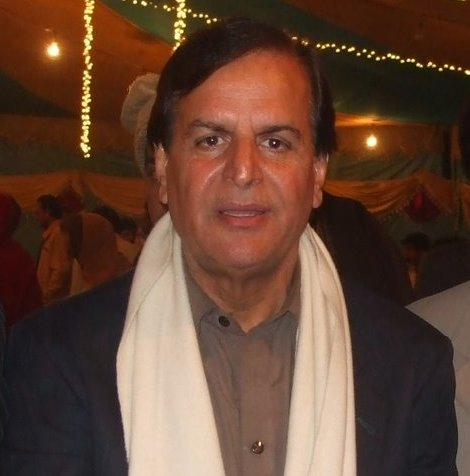

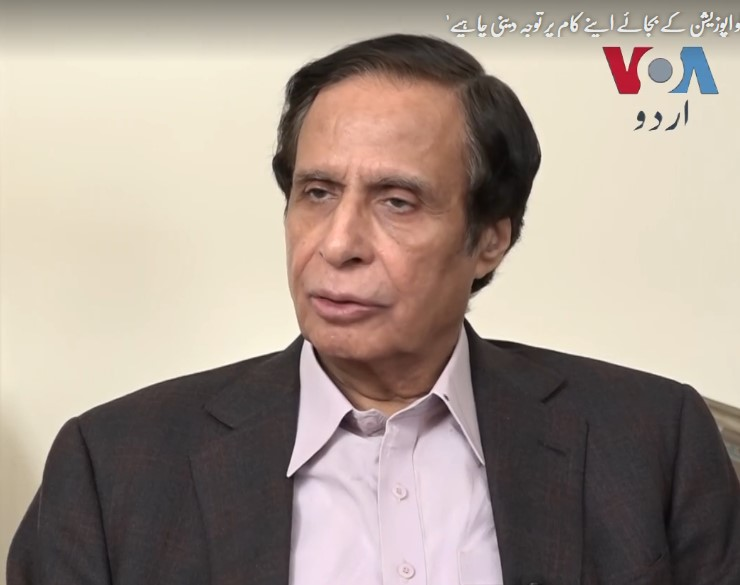
| | First party | Second party | Third party |
|---|---|---|---|
| Leader | Javed Hashmi | Raja Riaz Ahmad Khan | Chaudhry Pervaiz Elahi |
| Party | PML(N) | PPP | PML(Q) |
| Leader's seat | Did not contest | Faisalabad-XV | Mandi Bahauddin-III; Bahawalnagar-VI (lost) |
| Last election | 47 seats, 16.43% | 79 seats, 22.48% | 209 seats, 33.33% |
| Seats won | 148 | 103 | 79 |
| Seat change | ▲101 | ▲24 | ▼130 |
| Popular vote | 5,597,569 | 5,565,743 | 5,837,922 |
| Percentage | 27.05% | 26.89% | 28.21% |
| Swing | ▲10.62% | ▲4.41% | ▼5.12% |
- Elections map by constituency (expand to original file to see constituency labels)
Chief Minister before election
Chaudhry Pervaiz Elahi
PML(Q)
Elected Chief Minister
Dost Muhammad Khosa
PML(N)

Provincial elections were held in the Pakistani province of Punjab to elect the 15th Provincial Assembly of the Punjab on 18 February 2008, alongside nationwide general elections and three other provincial elections in Sindh, Balochistan and North-West Frontier Province. The remaining two territories of Pakistan, AJK and Gilgit-Baltistan, were ineligible to vote due to their disputed status.

== Results ==
| Party | Votes | % | Seats | | | |
| Party | Votes | % | General | Women | Minority | Total |
|---|---|---|---|---|---|---|
| Pakistan Muslim League (N) | 5,597,569 | 27.05 | 114 | 30 | 4 | 148 |
| Pakistan Peoples Party | 5,565,743 | 26.89 | 82 | 19 | 2 | 103 |
| Pakistan Muslim League (Q) | 5,837,922 | 28.21 | 61 | 16 | 2 | 79 |
| Pakistan Muslim League (F) | 182,753 | 0.88 | 2 | 1 | 0 | 3 |
| Muttahida Majlis-e-Amal | 160,715 | 0.78 | 2 | 0 | 0 | 2 |
| Other parties | 86,679 | 0.42 | 1 | 0 | 0 | 1 |
| Independents | 3,264,061 | 15.77 | 34 | 0 | 0 | 34 |
| Total | 20,695,442 | 100.00 | 297 | 66 | 8 | 371 |
| Registered voters/turnout | 43,780,458 | – | | | | |

== Aftermath ==
In the 2008 elections, the PML (N) and the PPP formed a coalition government, with PML (N) as the senior party and Shehbaz Sharif as Chief Minister of Punjab. However, in 2011, the PPP was expelled from this coalition due to corruption in the Federal Government, (which was led by the PPP at the time).
