= PP-209 Khanewal-V =

Constituency of the Punjabi Provincial Legislature, Pakistan

- Constituency for the Provincial Assembly of Punjab
- Region: Khanewal Tehsil (partly) of Khanewal District

Current constituency
- Created from: PP-218 Khanewal-VII (2002-2018); PP-209 Khanewal-VII (2018-2023)

PP-209 Khanewal-V (پی پی-209، خانیوال-5) is a constituency of the Provincial Assembly of Punjab.

== General elections 2024 ==
Provincial election 2024: PP-209 Khanewal-V
Party	Candidate	Votes	%	±%
PML(N)	Chaudhry Zia Ur Rehman	55,579	39.17	
Independent	Humayun Khan (Note: Filed nomination papers as PTI candidate but ECP allowed him to run as an Independent)	38,234	26.95	
IPP	Abdul Aleem Khan	35,077	24.72	
TLP	Rao Arif Ali	6,762	4.77	
Others	Others (eleven candidates)	6,242	4.39	
Turnout		144,589	56.30	
Total valid votes		141,894	98.14	
Rejected ballots		2,695	1.86	
Majority		17,345	12.22	
Registered electors		256,841		
hold				

== General elections 2018 ==
Provincial election 2018: PP-209 Khanewal-VII
Party	Candidate	Votes	%	±%
PML(N)	Muhammad Faisal Khan Niazi	55,273	43.63	
PTI	Abdul Razzaq Khan	39,064	30.83	
Independent	Muhammad Jamil Shah	25,759	20.33	
TLP	Muhammad Ramzan	3,413	2.69	
PPP	Chaudhary Muhammad Anwar Baig	1,883	1.49	
Others	Others (five candidates)	1,305	1.05	
Turnout		129,375	61.28	
Total valid votes		126,697	97.93	
Rejected ballots		2,678	2.07	
Majority		16,209	12.80	
Registered electors		211,114		

== General elections 2013 ==
Provincial election 2013: PP-218 Khanewal-VII
Party	Candidate	Votes	%	±%
Independent	Nawabzada Abdul Razzaq Khan Niazi	34,661	34.03	
PML(N)	Peer Muhammad Jameel Shah	33,033	32.43	
PTI	Muhammad Faisal Khan Niazi	26,172	25.69	
Independent	Furqan Ahmed Rao	3,308	3.25	
JI	Muhammad Yousaf Khatak	2,164	2.12	
Others	Others (eleven candidates)	2,523	2.48	
Turnout		104,635	64.21	
Total valid votes		101,861	97.35	
Rejected ballots		2,774	2.65	
Majority		1,628	1.60	
Registered electors		162,969		

== General elections 2008 ==
Contesting candidates	Party affiliation	Votes polled

== See also ==
- PP-208 Khanewal-IV
- PP-210 Khanewal-VI
