= Transport in Pakistan =

Transportation networks and infrastructure in Pakistan

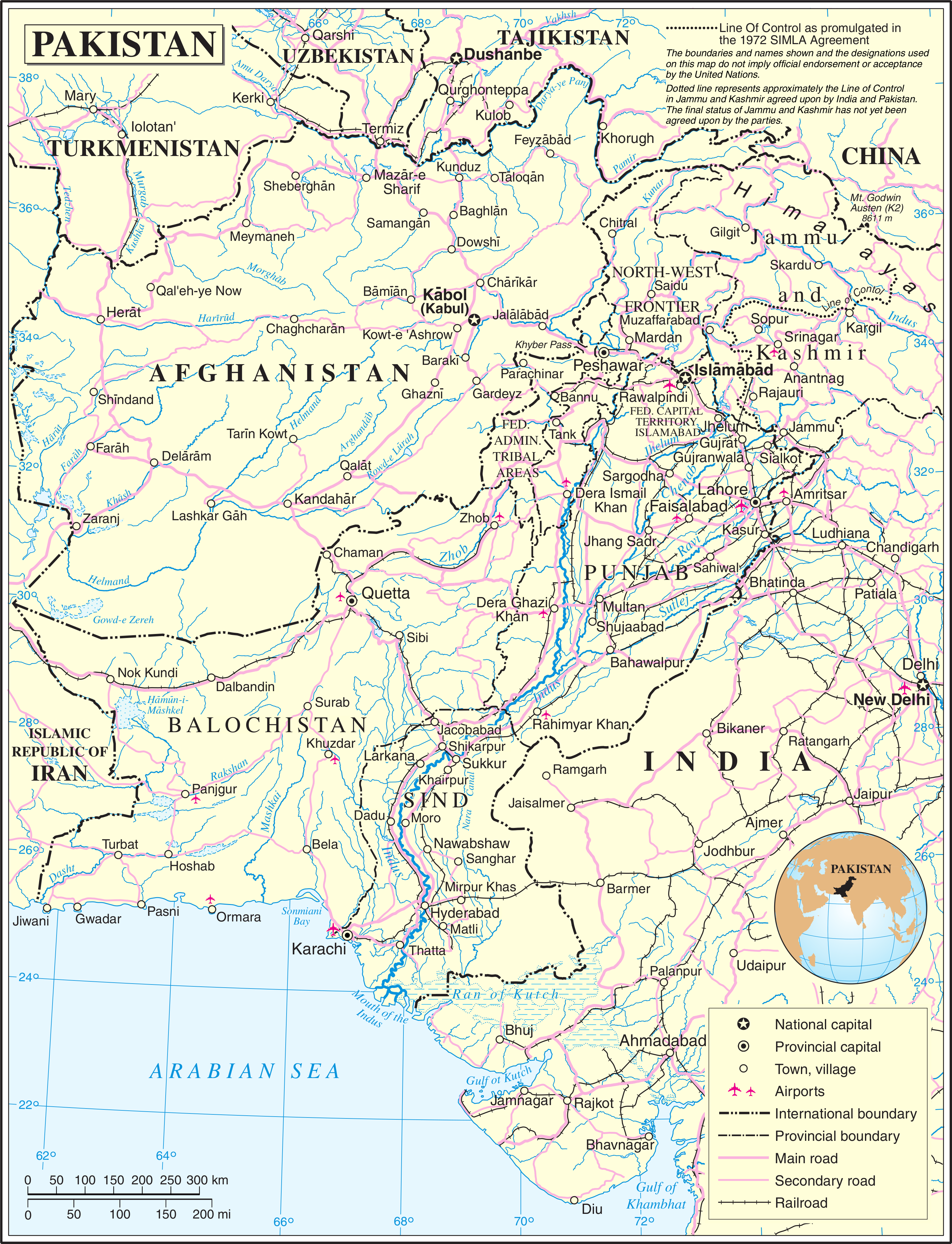
Pakistan transport network

Transport in Pakistan (Urdu: پاکِستان میں نقل و حمل) is extensive and varied. In the early 21st century new national highways and motorways were built, which improved trade and logistics within the country. Pakistan's rail network was also expanded. Airports and seaports have been built with foreign and domestic funding. Transportation challenges in Pakistan were escalating in 2011, due to poor planning, inadequate governance, and corrupt practices.

== History ==
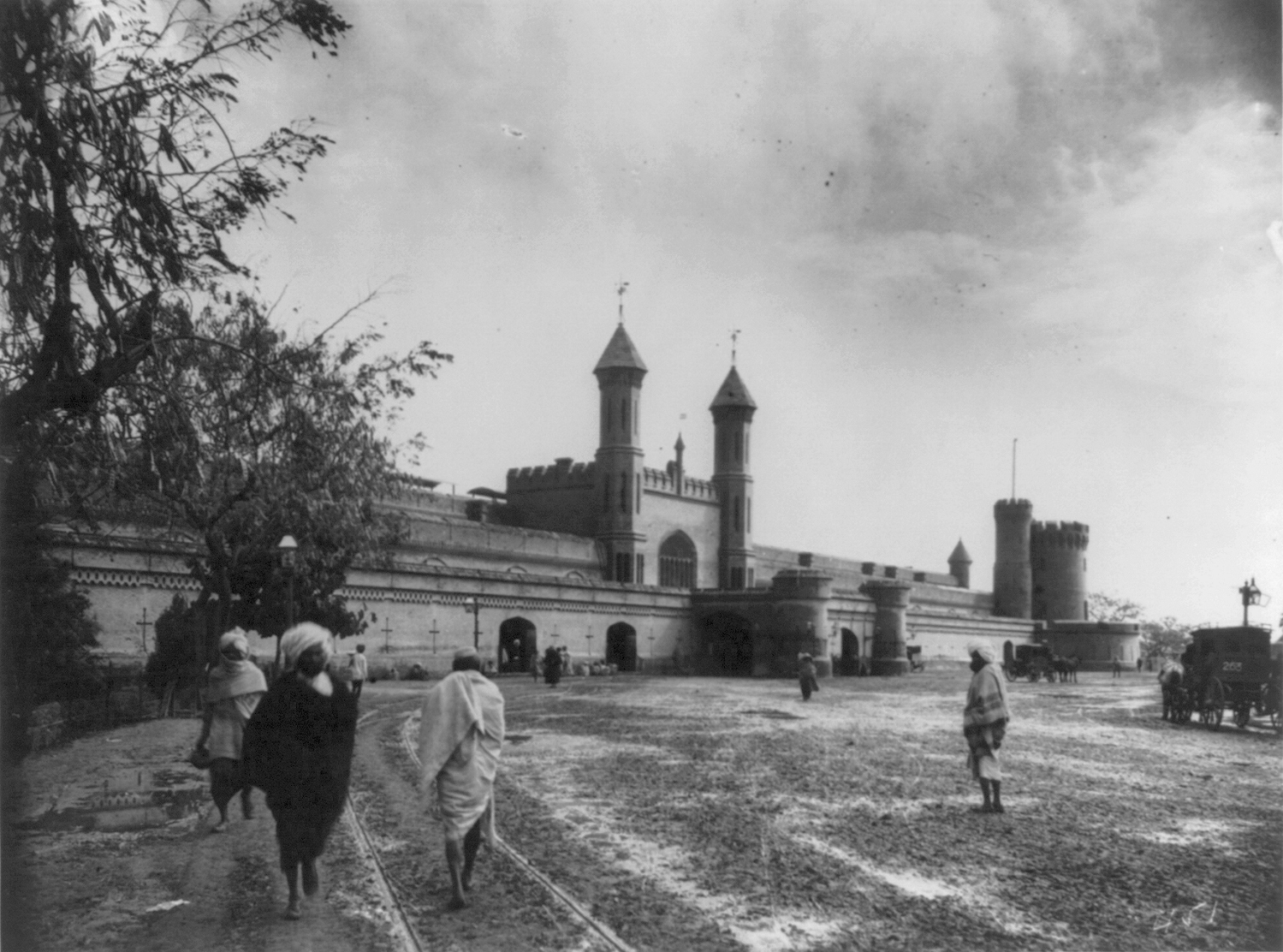
Lahore Junction Railway Station, c.1895.

The history of transport in modern-day Pakistan dates back to the Indus Valley civilization.

The Grand Trunk Road was a major road commissioned by Sher Shah Suri in the 16th century and used during the Suri and Mughal periods. Trees were planted, and mosques and temples built along the road. Caravanserais were built for travelers to spend the night.

Railways and Airways were developed during the British Raj. The first railways in Pakistan were built from 1885.

== Road ==
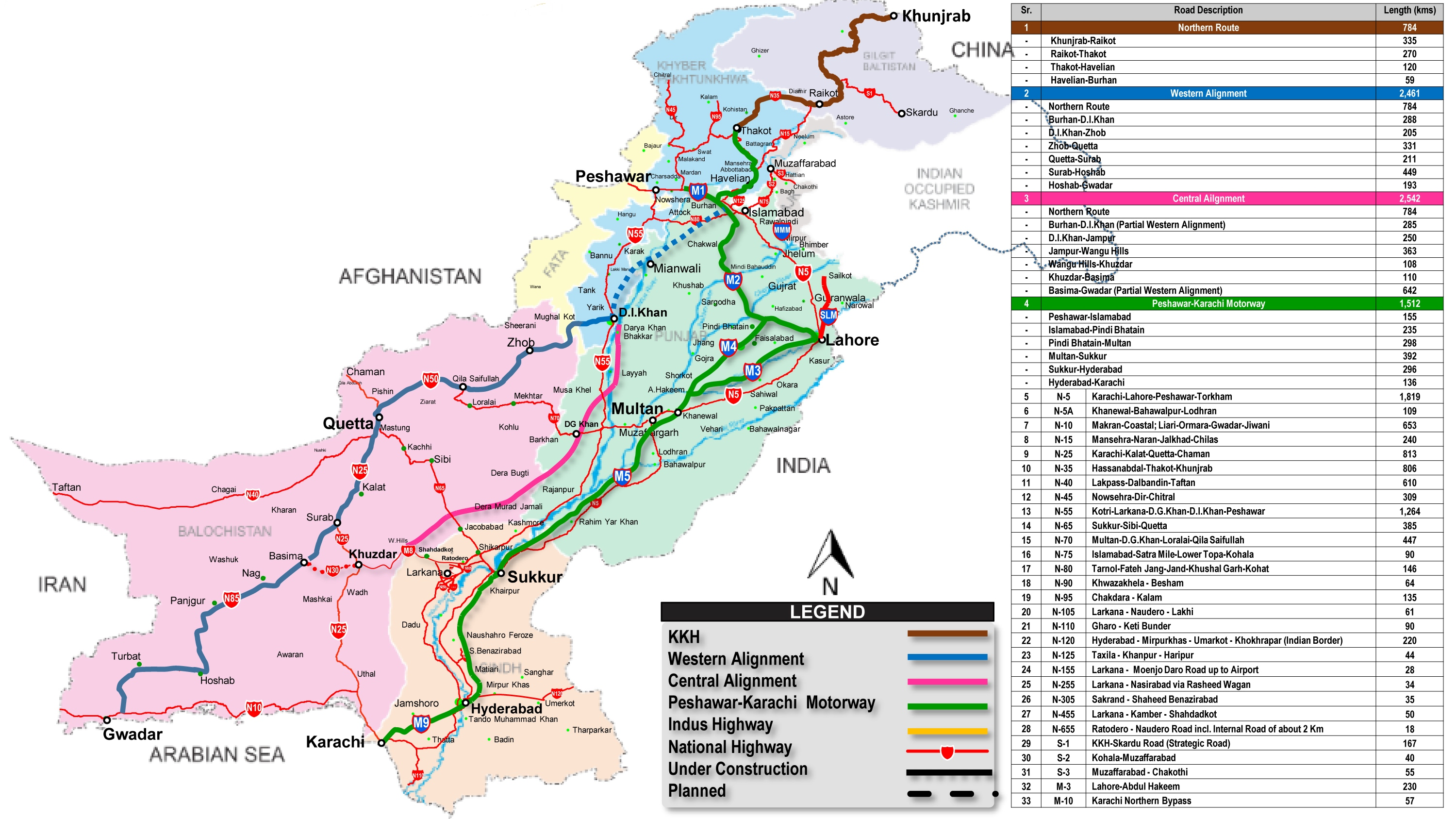
Roadway network of Pakistan

- Total: 263,775 kilometres (163,902 mi)
  - Paved: 152,033 km (94,469 mi) (Including 1,600 km (990 mi) of Motorway and 300 km (190 mi) of Expressways)
  - Unpaved: 105,650 km (65,650 mi)
  - Vehicles on road: 4.2 million vehicles 250,000 commercial vehicles (2004 estimate)

=== Motorways ===
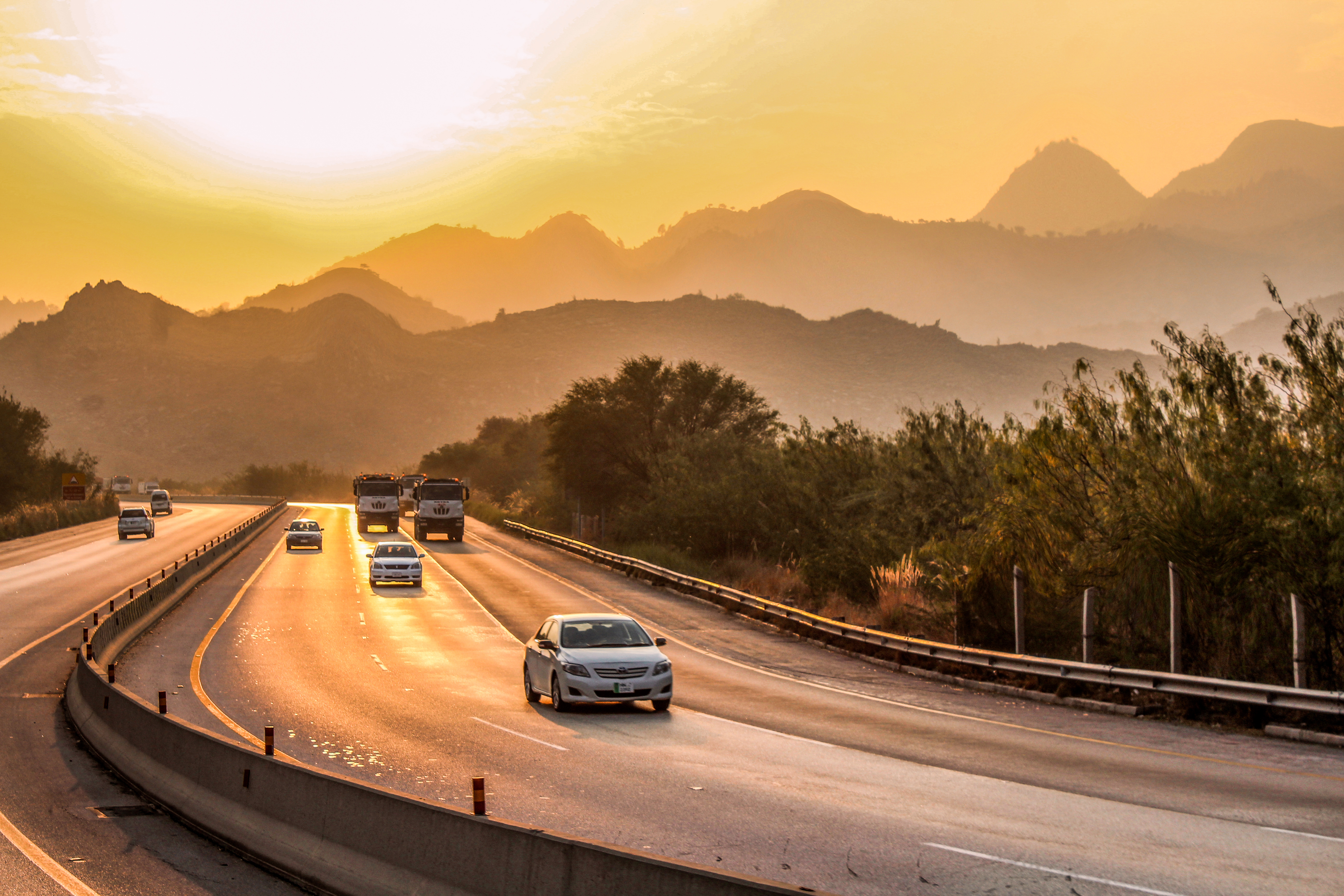
The motorway passes through the Salt Range mountains

The construction of motorways began in the early 1990s, with the idea of building a world-class road network and reducing the load on the heavily used national highways throughout the country. The M-2 was the first motorway completed in 1998, linking the cities of Islamabad and Lahore. In the past 5 years, many new motorways have opened up, including the M-1 and M-4. The M4 is operational and connects the cities of Pindi Bhatian (M-2), Faisalabad and Multan via Gojra, Toba Tek Singh, Jhang, Shorkot, Pir Mahal and Khanewal. In 2019 M-3 became operational, which connects Lahore with Multan through Abdul Hakeem and the existing M4 near Multan. It terminates at the M5, which became operational in 2019. The M-5 lead to the Sukkur District of Sindh. There, the M-6 (which is proposed with construction work to begin soon) will start; the M6 will end at Hyderabad, where it will meet the existing M9 motorway to Karachi. In addition to this, the M-8 in Baluchistan province, the longest motorway of Pakistan, is half under construction, half operational. In central Punjab, the Lahore-Sialkot Motorway (M-11) opened on 18 March 2020 and in KPK province, the Hakka-Dera Ismail Khan Motorway (M14) is also under construction. Swat Motorway has been completed and operational up to Chakdarra. Hazara Motorway one more expressway under construction in KPK province.

=== National Highways ===
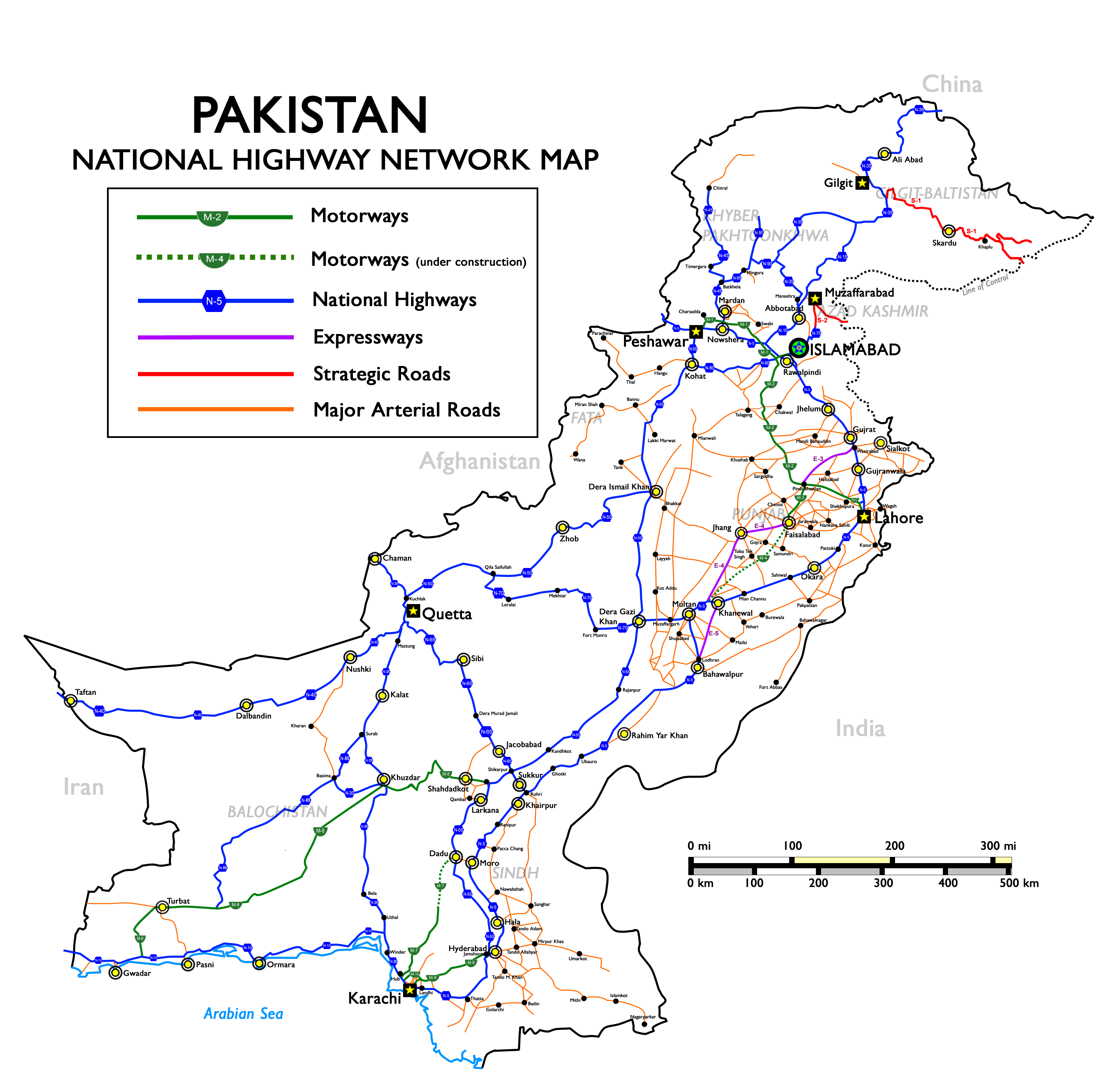
National Highways, Motorways & Strategic Roads of Pakistan.

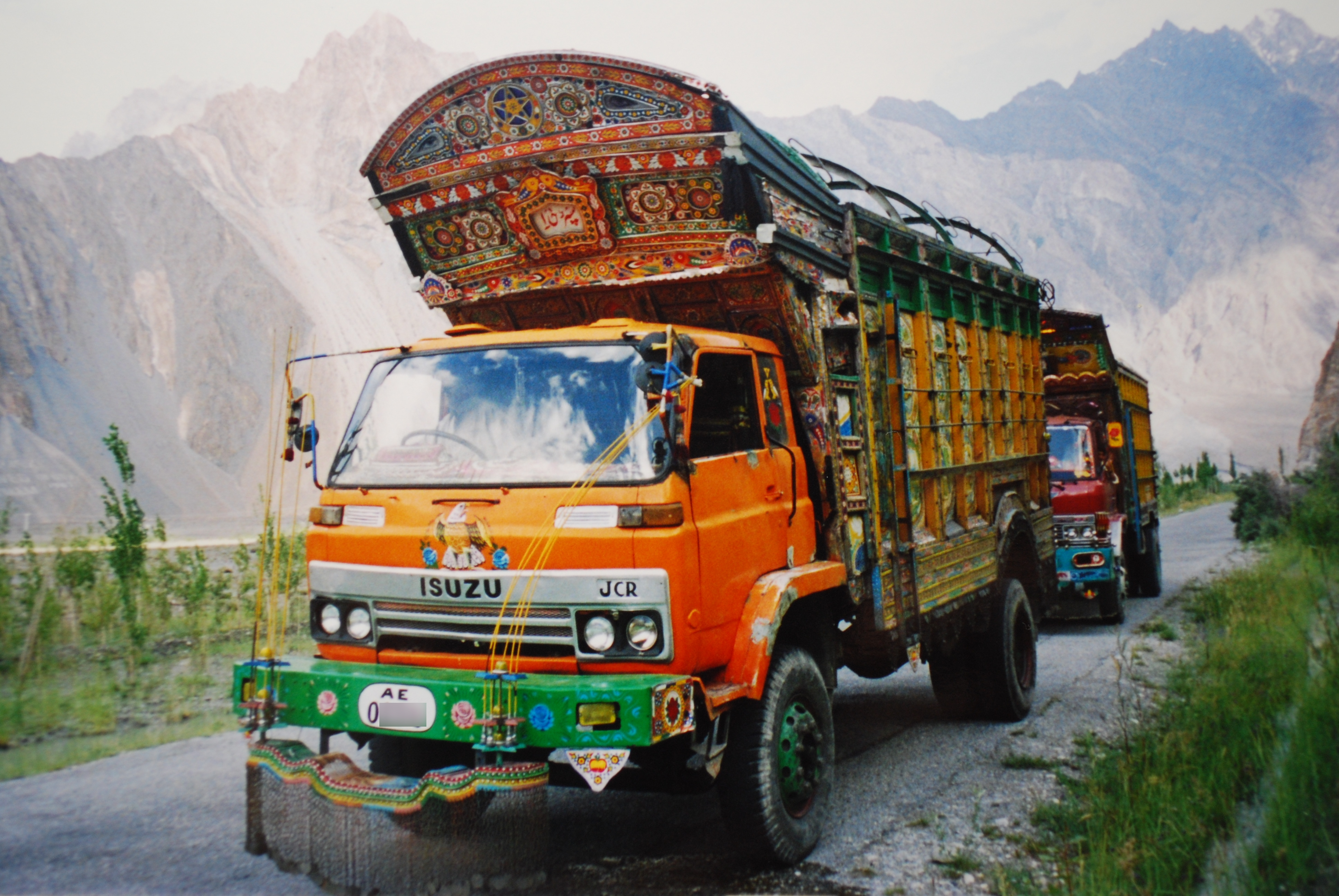
Jingle trucks on Karakoram Highway

During the 1990s, Pakistan began an ongoing project to rebuild all national highways throughout the country specifically to important financial, cargo and textile centers. The National Highway Authority or NHA is responsible for the maintenance of all national highways in Pakistan.

- The Makran Coastal Highway follows the coast of Sindh and Balochistan provinces, linking Karachi and Gwadar. Journey time has been reduced to six or seven hours with the construction of the new Coastal Highway. The highway was built as part of an overall plan to improve transport facilities in southern Balochistan.
- The Karakoram Highway is the highest paved international road in the world. It connects China and Pakistan across the Karakoram mountain range, through the Khunjerab Pass.
- The Grand Trunk Road (commonly abbreviated to GT Road) is one of South Asia's oldest and longest major roads. For several centuries, it has linked the eastern and western regions of the South Asia, running from Teknaf in Bangladesh, entering West Bengal, India travelling across to north India, into Peshawar in Pakistan.
- The Silk Road is an extensive interconnected network of trade routes across the Asian continent connecting East, South, and Western Asia with the Mediterranean world, including North Africa and Europe. It passes through the midsection of Pakistan through cities: Peshawar, Taxila and Multan.

=== Provincial Highways ===
- Provincial Highways of Pakistan administered Kashmir.
- Provincial Highways of Balochistan
- Provincial Highways of Gilgit-Baltistan
- Provincial Highways of Khyber Pakhtunkhwa
- Provincial Highways of Punjab
- Provincial Highways of Sindh

=== Flyovers and underpasses ===
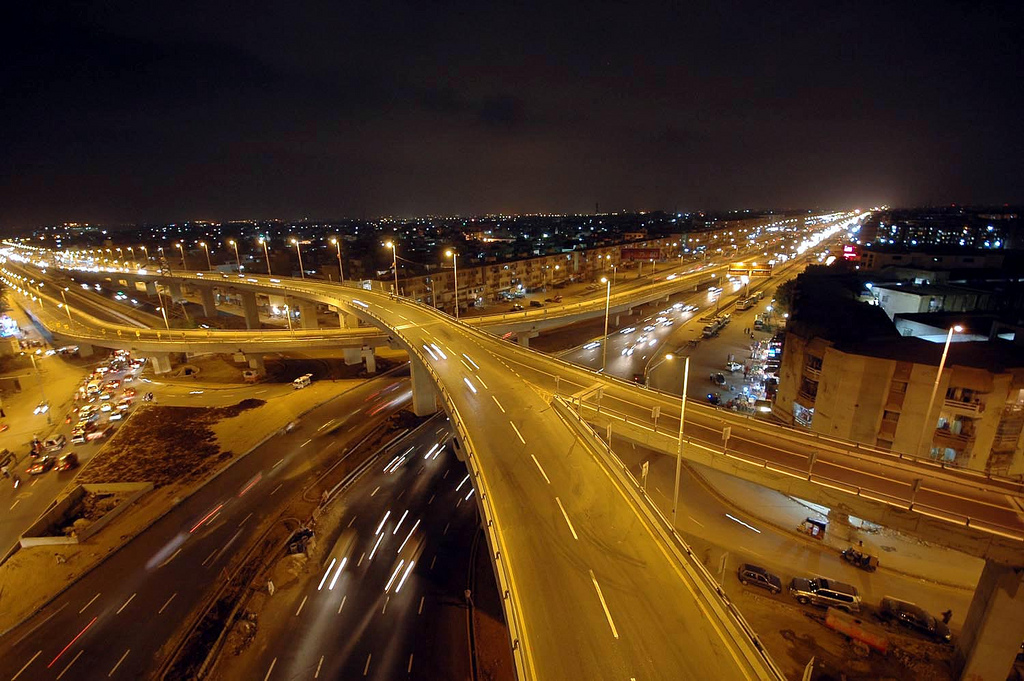
Nagan Chowrangi Flyover, Karachi

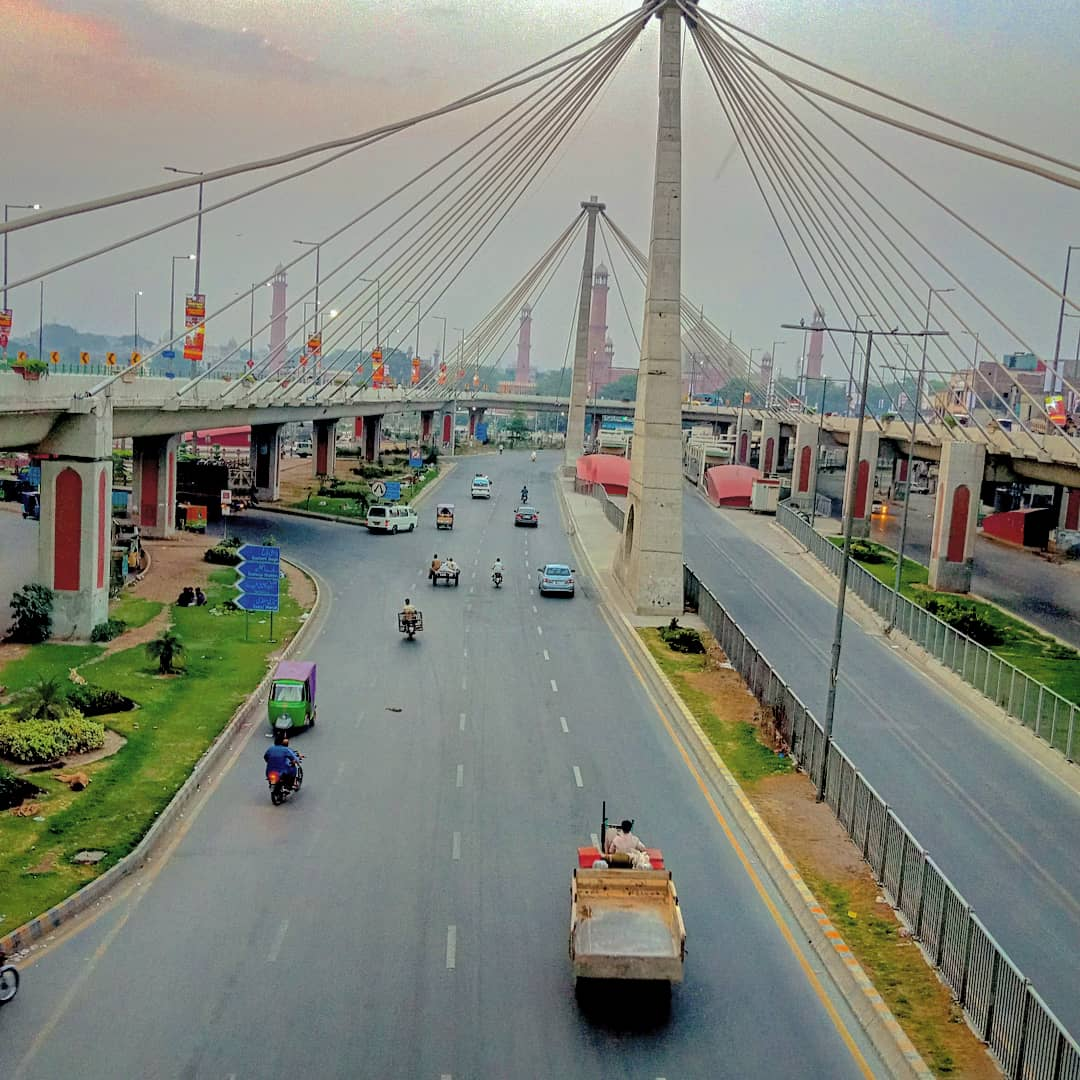
Azadi Chowk Flyover, Lahore

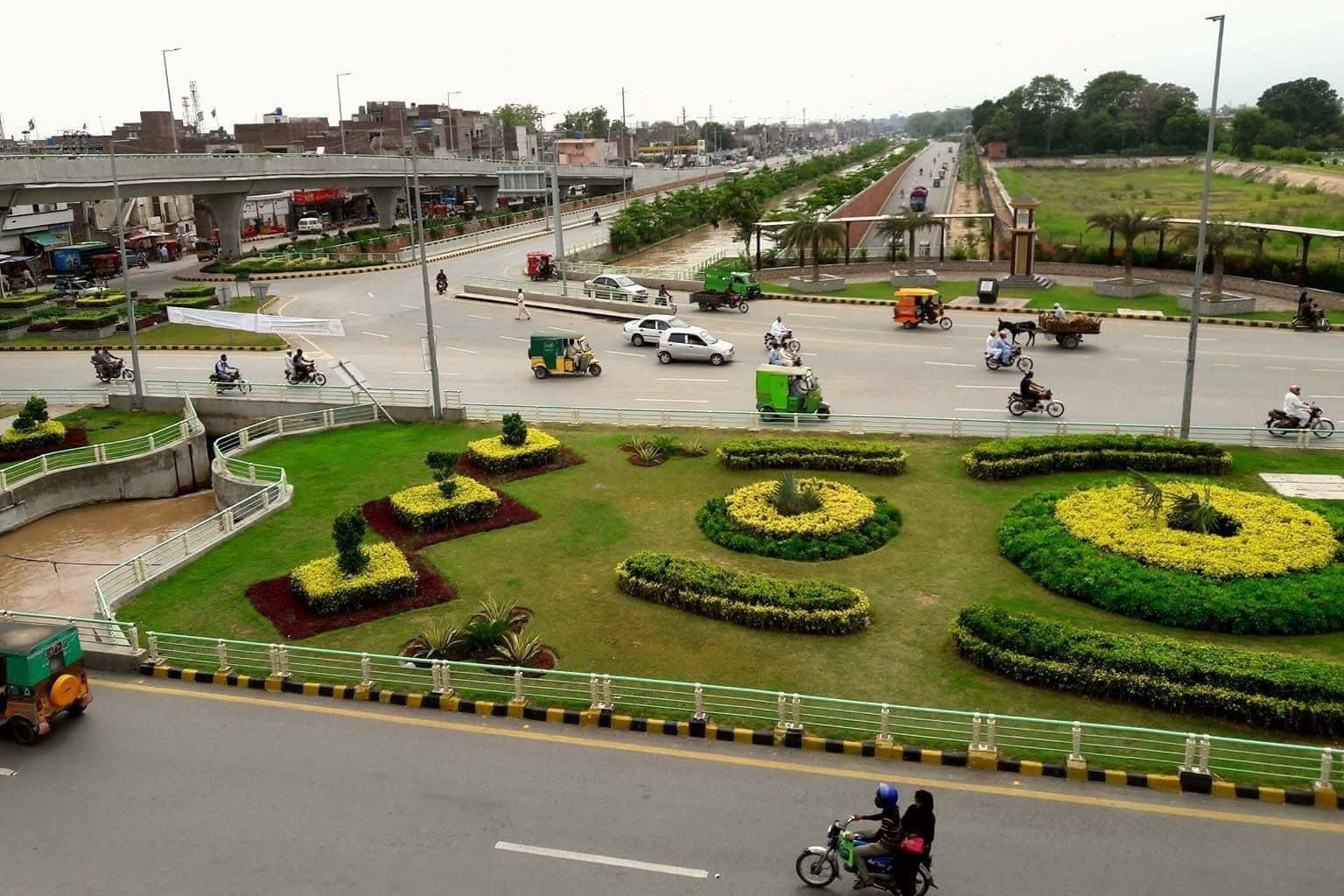
Sufi Barkat Ali Flyover and Underpass, Faisalabad

Many flyovers and underpasses are located in major urban areas of the country to regulate the flow of traffic. The highest number of flyovers and under passes are located in Karachi, followed by Lahore. Other cities having flyovers and underpasses for the regulation of flow of traffic includes Islamabad-Rawalpindi, Peshawar, Gujranwala, Multan, Faisalabad, Hyderabad, Quetta, Sargodha, Bahawalpur, Sukkur, Larkana, Rahim Yar Khan and Sahiwal etc.

Beijing Underpass, Lahore is the longest underpass of Pakistan with a length of about 1.3 km (0.81 mi). Muslim Town Flyover, Lahore is the longest flyover of the country with a length of about 2.6 km (1.6 mi).

=== Buses ===
Within cities, buses provide a significant role in commuting a large number of travelers from one city to another. Recently, large CNG buses have been put onto the streets of various cities, primarily Karachi and Lahore, and recently Islamabad, Peshawar as the minivans which were originally used were beginning to cause large traffic problems. Private yellow and white minivans have services throughout cities in Pakistan and get commuters from one point of the city to the other at a low cost. Since 2000, however, the government has taken a comprehensive initiative to modernize the existing bus fleets and minimally impact the environment. This public-private enterprise gradually introduced 8,000 CNG buses throughout the country, and 800 in Karachi.

Electric buses have been added in several cities since 2023. In January 2023 the Government of Sindh began running electric buses in Karachi under the Peoples Bus Service, on a route from Malir Cantonment to Sea View. In Islamabad, the Capital Development Authority put electric buses on four feeder routes of the Metro Bus in July 2024 and added four more routes in December 2024. In Punjab, the provincial government started a 27-bus electric service in Lahore in February 2025. It later launched the Green Electric Bus service in other cities, including Rawalpindi in November 2025 and Chiniot, Sialkot, Okara, Murree and Layyah in July 2026. The government plans to run 5,000 electric buses across the province within five years.

- Intercity

Bus service in urban areas and between cities is well-established with services run by both public and private sectors.

- International

International bus services to various countries are also well-established in Pakistan:

- Islamabad-Dushanbe, Tajikistan (proposed)
- Peshawar-Kabul, Afghanistan
- Peshawar-Jalalabad, Afghanistan
- Gwadar-Zahidan, Iran
- Karachi-Quetta-Zahidan-Tehran, Iran (proposed)
- Quetta-Mashad, Iran
- Quetta-Zahidan, Iran
- Islamabad-Kashghar, China (proposed)
- Gilgit-Kashgar see Karakoram Highway

=== Taxis ===
Another very common form of transport, seen mainly at hotels and airports, are yellow taxis. Drivers normally charge according to a meter, but fares can be negotiated if there is no meter. There are also numerous privately run services that use cars and minibuses of various types throughout Pakistan. The Radio Cab was introduced, allowing people to phone a toll-free number to connect with the closest taxi stand, in Islamabad, Rawalpindi, Karachi, Peshawar and Lahore. with services for Hyderabad and Faisalabad to follow.

An app-based local cab service, iCAB, was introduced in August 2017, claiming to be the first cab service of the country with a centralized platform for all kinds of road transportation services, launched from the capital territory and to be expanded into thirteen cities.

In 2025, the Government of Punjab launched the Green E-Taxi Scheme to provide electric vehicles for taxi drivers, intended to reduce emissions and modernize urban transport.

=== Cars ===
Over the years, the number of cars on Pakistani roads has tripled. Traffic jams are common in major cities across Pakistan. Luxury SUVs and cars are owned by well-off people.

==== Future cars ====
Students and teachers from the National University of Science and Technology in 2010 developed Pakistan's first ever hybrid gasoline car, the Devrim II, based on the Turkish Devrim. Before that, students from Naval College Karachi and Ghulam Ishaq Khan Institute had made a less effective hybrid car; the group, the Pak-Wheelers, had succeeded in 2011 in developing a car with a fuel efficiency of 450 kilometres per liter, but were trying to improve it to more than 700 by using hybrid technology.

=== Auto rickshaws ===
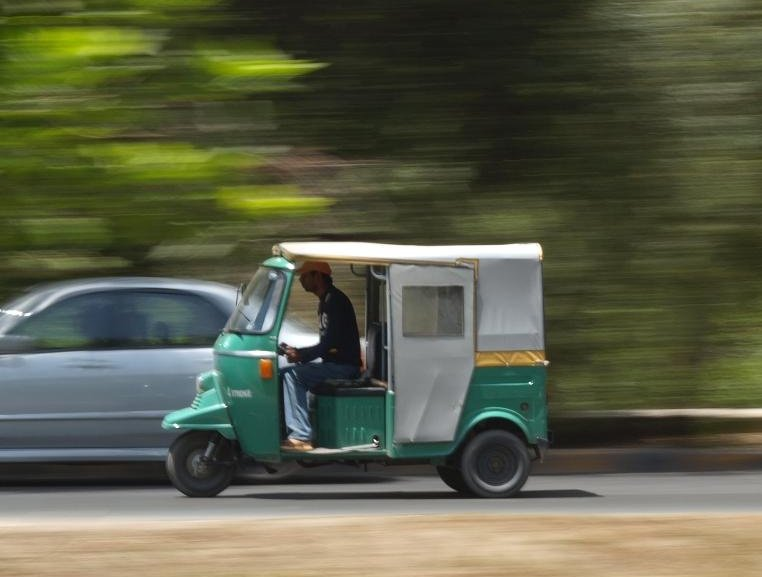
Due to increasing environmental issues with older rickshaws, the government has heavily invested in greener, more fuel-efficient rickshaws

Auto rickshaws are a popular method of travelling in cities and are found in almost every city and town in Pakistan. The fare is usually negotiable before commencing a journey; however, due to the level of pollution contributed by auto-rickshaws, the government has recently begun banning older ones and replacing them with CNG auto rickshaws, which tend to be less noisy, form less pollutants and are much bigger and more comfortable. The Punjab government decided in 2005 to replace two-stroke three-wheelers with CNG-fitted four-stroke rickshaws in Lahore, Multan, Faisalabad, Rawalpindi and Gujranwala. Three manufacturers were ordered to produce 60,000 four-stroke vehicles, but they reportedly supplied 2,000 to the government which are now plying on city roads. Similar ordinances are now being considered in other provinces of Pakistan.

A new form of transport in Pakistan is the Qing-Qi (pronounced "ching-chee"), which is a cross between a motorcycle and auto-rickshaw. It runs just like a motorcycle but has three wheels instead of two and can carry a much heavier load. It is an urban transport vehicle and is used mostly for short distances.

=== Motorcycling and ride-hailing ===
Motorcycling is considered to be the most quickest way of getting to areas that four-wheeled vehicles cannot reach, and is also used in cities. Not all riders wear helmets. Companies such as Bykea, Uber, and Careem offer ride-hailing services with bikes or motorcycles in several cities.

In 2019 two more private ride-sharing services, Pakistani Airlift and Egyptian SWVL, were introduced in Karachi.

== Metro ==
=== Train ===
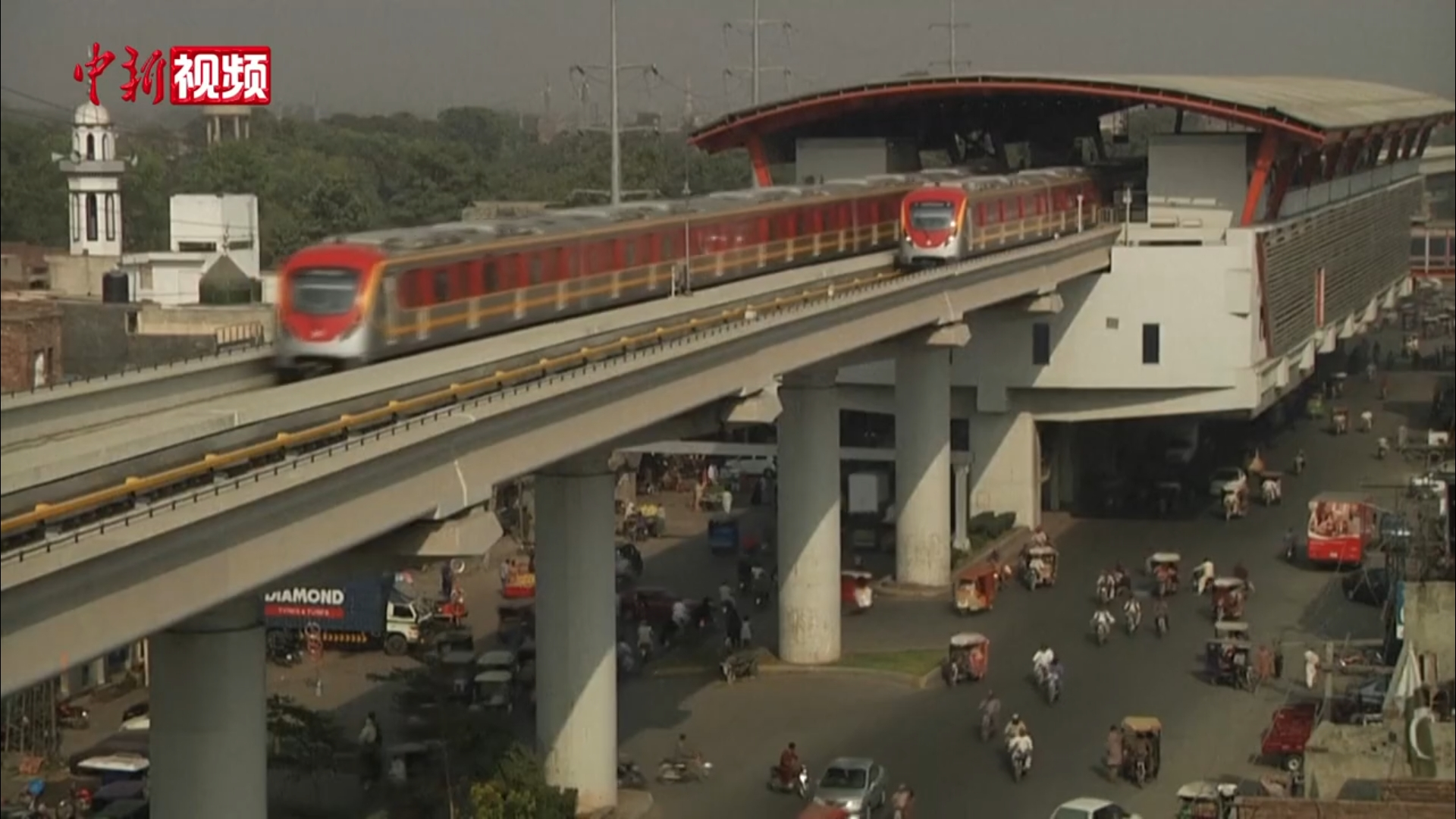
Orange Line Metro Train, Lahore

- The Orange Line Metro Train is an automated rapid transit system in Lahore. The Orange line is the first of the three proposed rail lines proposed for the Lahore Metro. The line spans 27.1 km (16.8 mi) with 25.4 km (15.8 mi) elevated and 1.72 km (1.1 mi) underground and have a cost of 251.06 billion Rupees ($1.6 billion). The line consists of 26 subway stations and is designed to carry over 250,000 passengers daily.

=== Bus ===
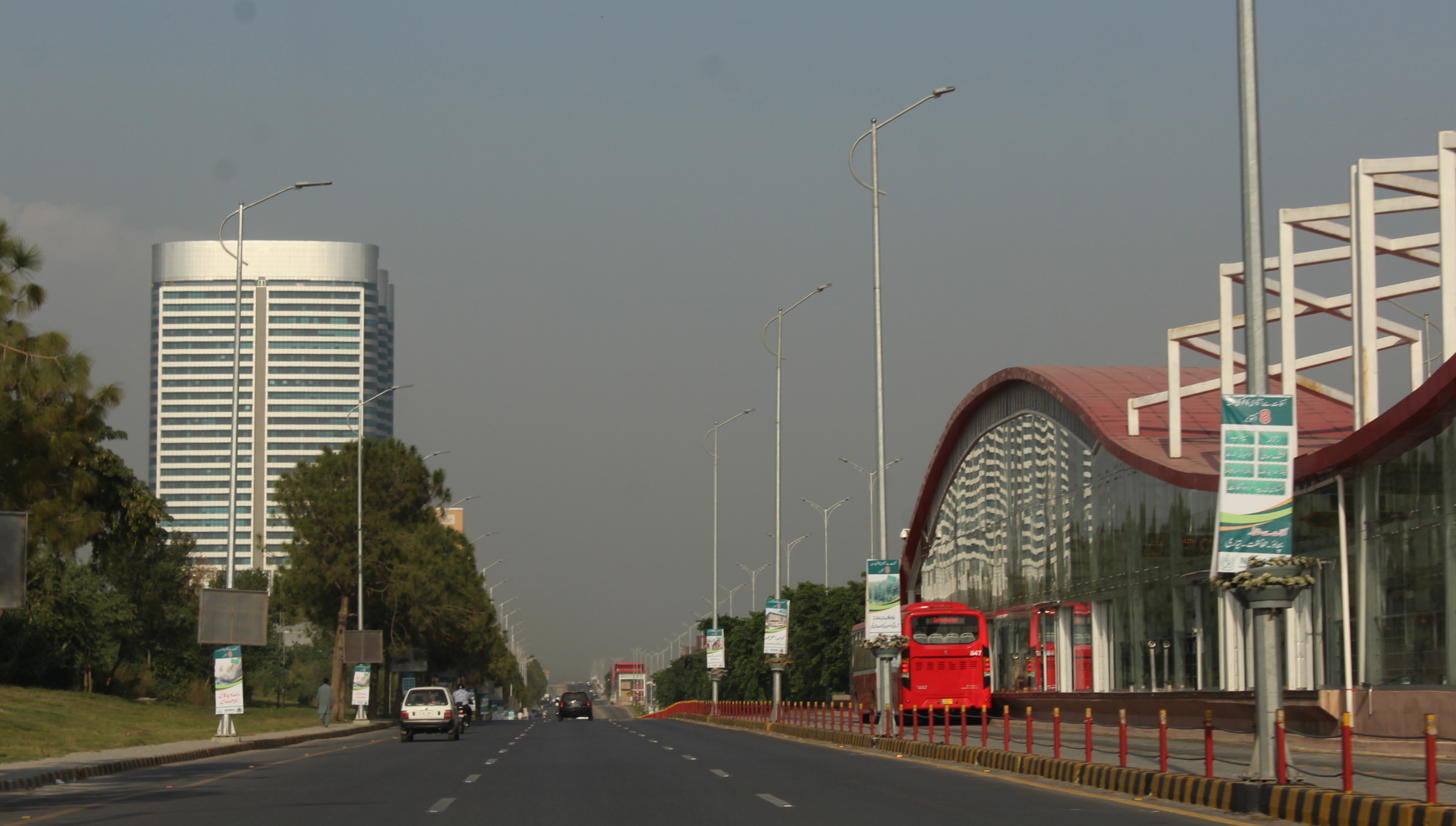
Track of Islamabad-Rawalpindi Metrobus with adjoining station

- Lahore Metrobus is a bus rapid transit service operating in the city of Lahore. The Metrobus network's first phase was opened in February, 2013.
- Rawalpindi-Islamabad Metrobus is an 83.6 km (51.9 mi) bus rapid transit system operating in the Islamabad Rawalpindi metropolitan area. The Metrobus network's first phase was opened on June 4, 2015, and stretches 22 kilometres between Pak Secretariat, in Islamabad, and Saddar in Rawalpindi. The system uses e-ticketing and an Intelligent Transportation System and is managed by the Punjab Mass Transit Authority.
- Multan Metrobus is a bus rapid transit (BRT) system in Multan. Construction on the line began in May 2015, while operations commenced on 24 January 2017.
- Peshawar Bus Rapid Transit (Peshawar BRT) is a bus rapid transit system by the Peshawar Development Authority (PDA) in Peshawar, capital of Khyber Pakhtunkhwa province. The construction of the project was started in October 2017 and became operational on 13 August 2020.
- Green Line Metrobus is the first phase of Karachi Metrobus that is operational in Karachi. The Government of Pakistan is financing the majority of the project. Construction of the Green Line began on February 26, 2016, and became operational on 25 December 2021.
- Faisalabad shuttle train service and Faisalabad Metrobus are the proposed rapid transit projects in the city of Faisalabad. These projects are the part of a mega-project of China–Pakistan Economic Corridor.

=== Tram ===
- A tramway service was started in 1884 in Karachi, but was closed in 1975. Sindh Government was planning in 2019 to restart the tramway services in the city with the collaboration of Austrian experts.
- In October 2019, a project for the construction of a tram service in Lahore was signed by the Punjab Government, to be launched under public-private partnership in a joint venture of European and Chinese companies and the Punjab transport department.

=== Monorail ===
- In 2020 the Government of Pakistan was proposing to start a monorail system in the federal capital Islamabad.

== Rail ==
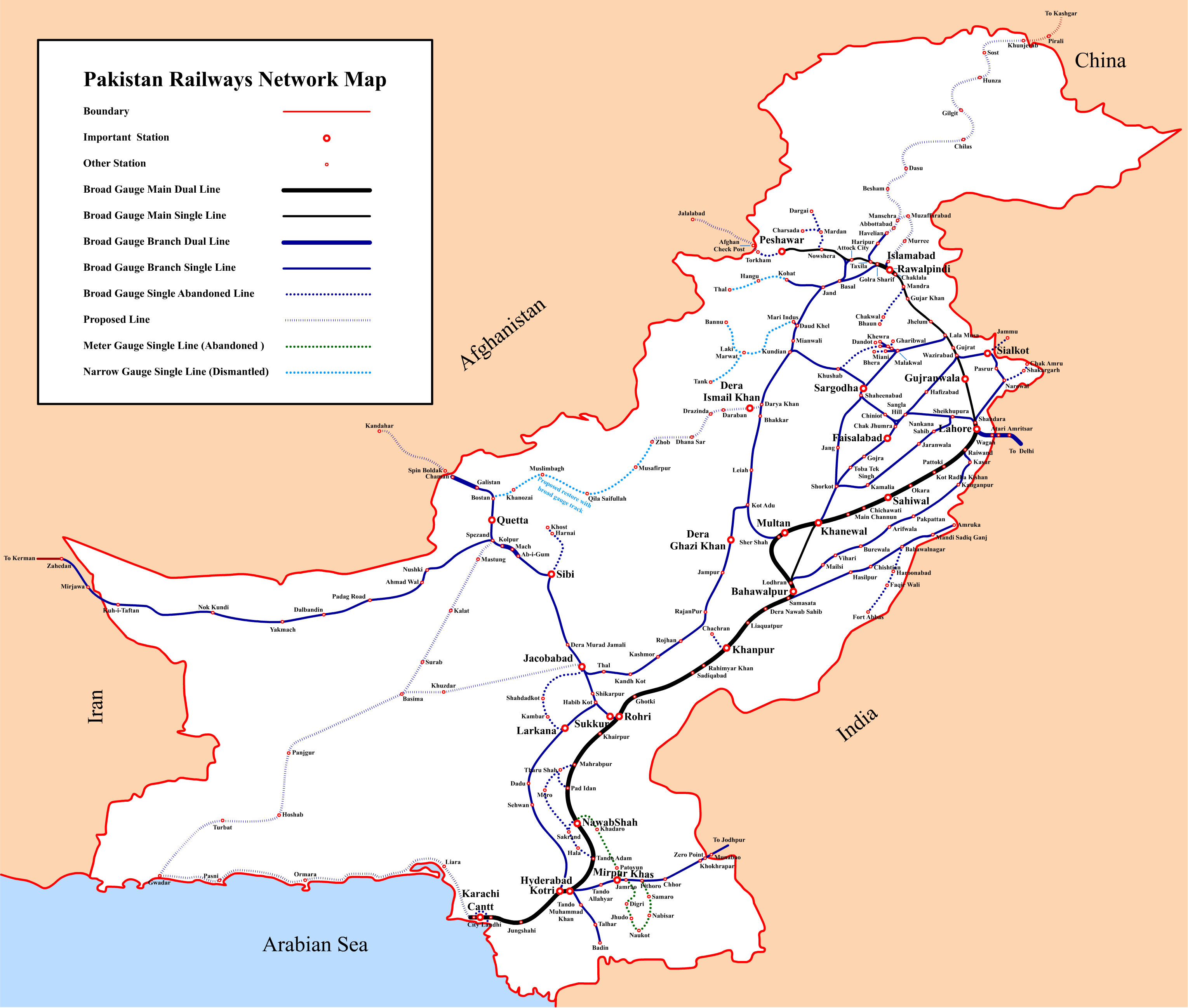
Pakistan Railways Network

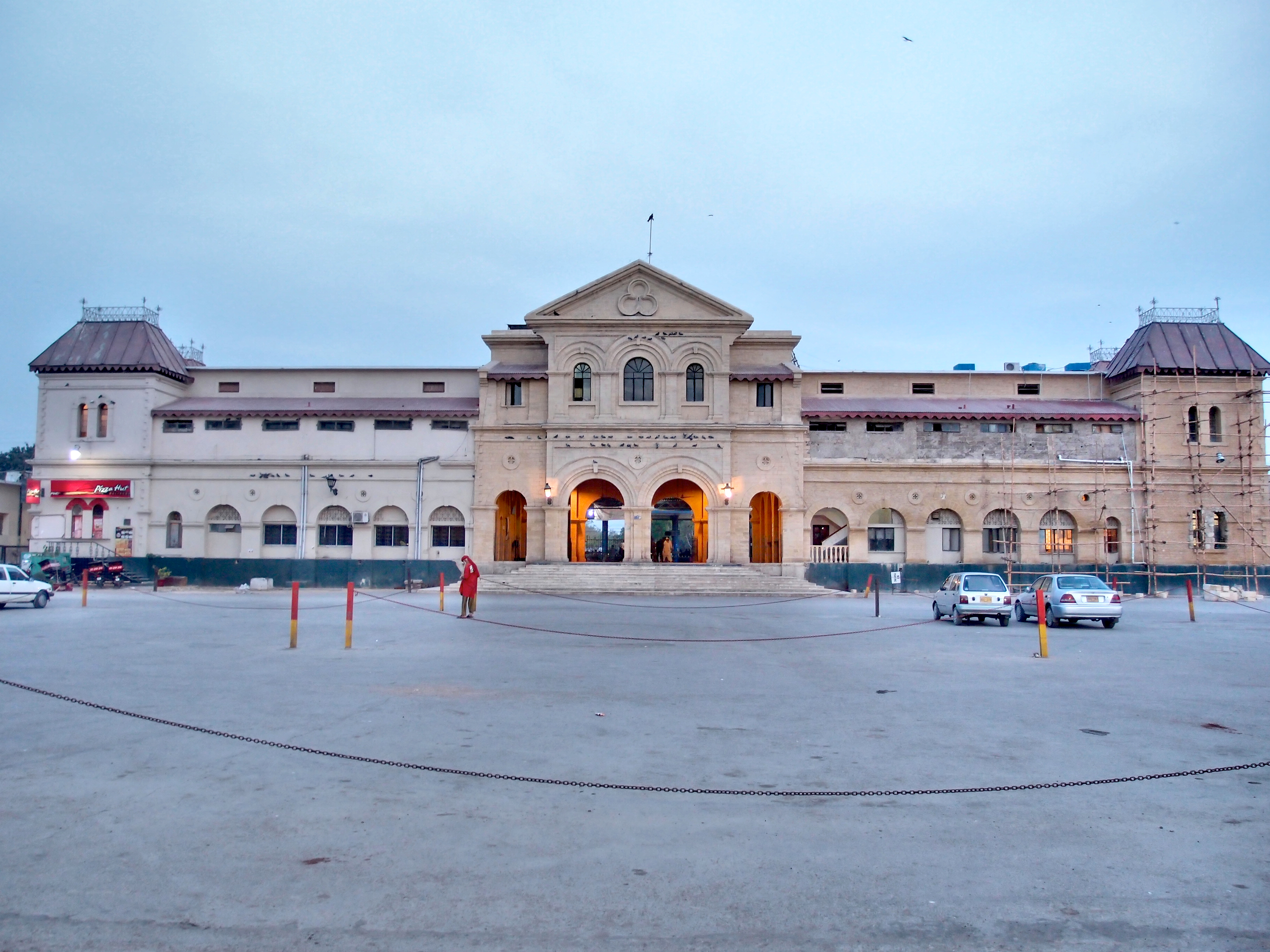
Karachi Cantonment railway station

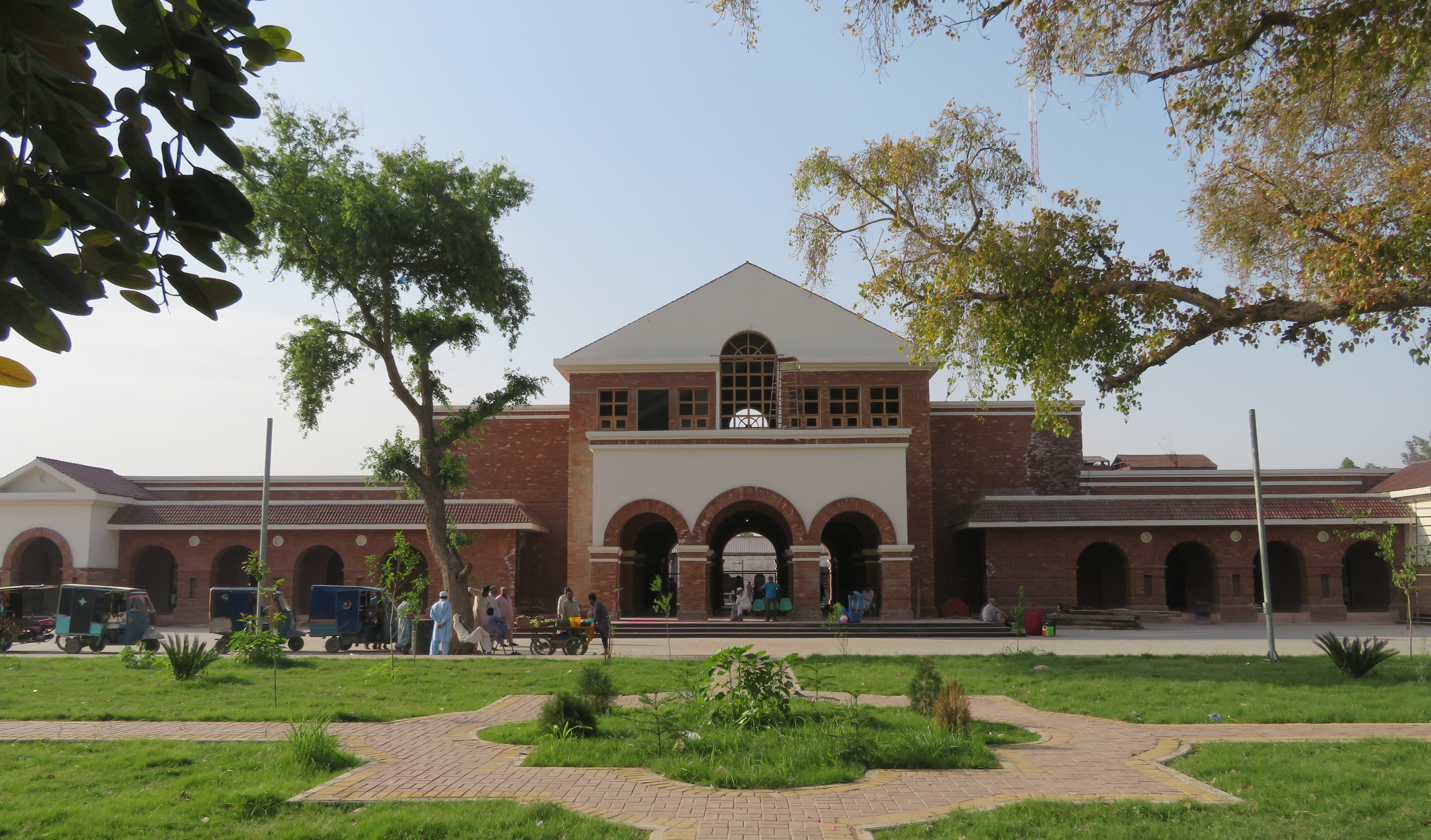
Sahiwal railway station

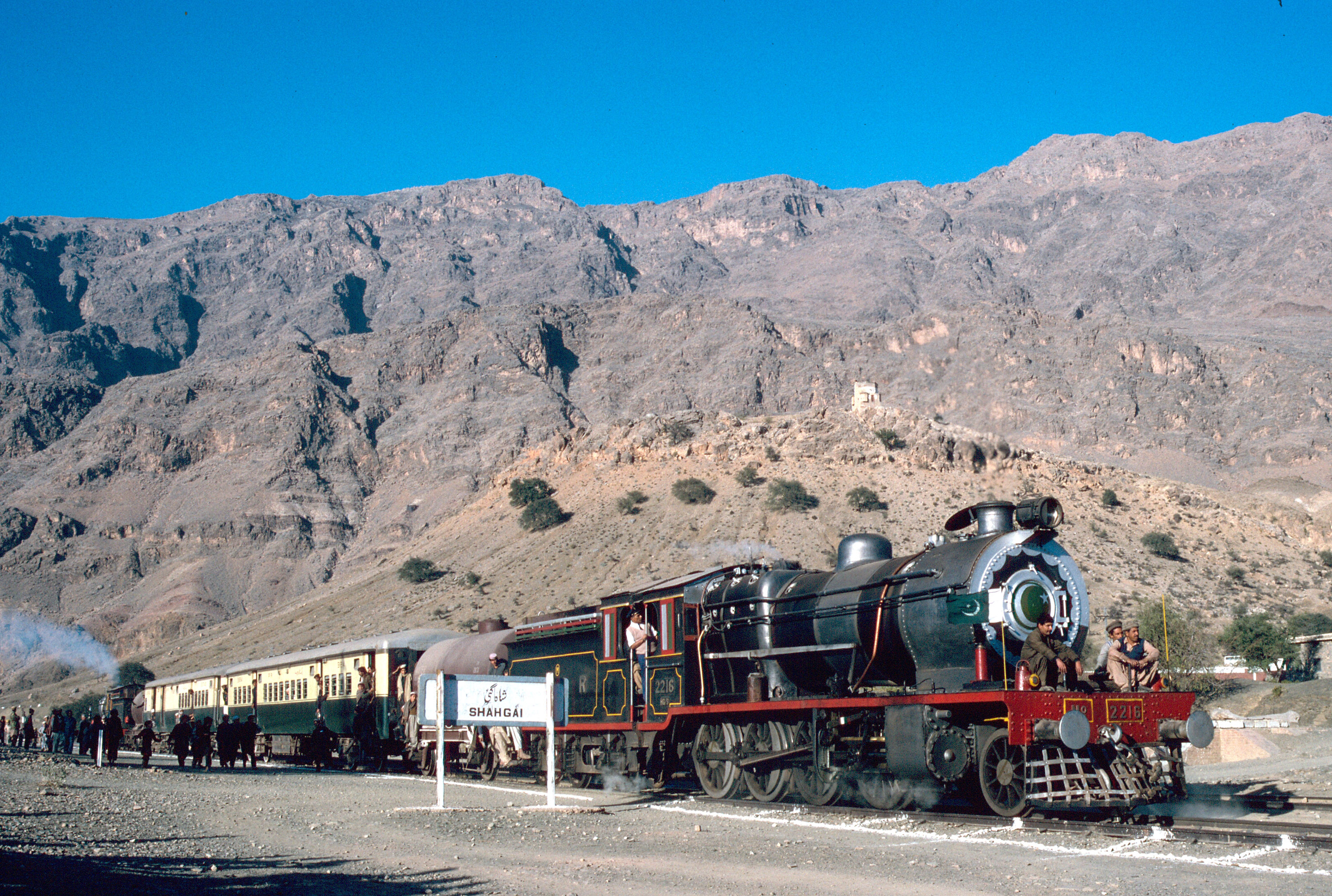
Khyber Express at Shahgai station

=== Domestic ===
Rail services in Pakistan are provided by the state-run Pakistan Railways, under the supervision of the Ministry of Railways. Pakistan Railways provides an important mode of transportation in Pakistan, catering to the large-scale movement of people and freight. The railway network comprised 11,881 km in 2019, all 5 ft 6 in (1,676 mm) gauge, including 286 km of electrified track. Passenger earnings comprised 50% of the total revenue; in 1999–2000 this amounted to Rs. 4.8 billion. Pakistan Railways carry 65 million passengers annually and daily operate 228 mail, express and passenger trains. Pakistan Railways also operate special trains for various occasions. The Freight Business Unit with 12,000 personnel operates over 200 freight stations on the railway network. The FBU serves the Port of Karachi and Port Qasim as well as in various other stations along the network and generates revenue from the movement of agricultural, industrial and imported products such as wheat, coal, fertiliser, cement and sugar. About 39% of the revenue is generated from the transportation of petroleum, 19% from imported wheat, fertiliser and rock phosphate. The remaining 42% is earned from domestic traffic. The freight rate structure is based on market trends in road transport, which is the main competitor to rail transport.

=== High speed rail ===
Prime Minister Nawaz Sharif said that a high-speed rail network would be built

connecting Peshawar and Karachi via all major cities of Pakistan during his visit to China in June 2016. The Government was making plans for this project in 2013.

=== Rail links with adjacent countries ===
Iran - A 5 ft 6 in (1,676 mm) railway line runs from Zahedan to Quetta, and a 4 ft 8 1/2 in (1,435 mm) standard gauge line is finished from Zahedan to Kerman in central Iran, linking with the rest of the Iranian rail network. On May 18, 2007, a MOU for rail cooperation was signed by Pakistan and Iran under which the line will be completed by December 2008. Now that the rail systems are linked up at Zahedan, there is a break-of-gauge between the Islamic Republic of Iran Railways 4 ft 8 1/2 in (1,435 mm) standard gauge tracks and Pakistan Railway's Indian gauge tracks.

Afghanistan - Currently there is no rail link to Afghanistan since no railway network is present in that country, however Pakistan Rail has proposed to help build an Afghan Rail Network in three phases. The first phase will stretch from the Chaman to Spin Boldak in Afghanistan. The second phase will extend line to Kandahar and the third phase will eventually connect to Herat. From there, the line will be extended to Khushka, Turkmenistan. The final phase would link 5 ft 6 in (1,676 mm) with Central Asian 1,520 mm (4 ft 11 27/32 in) Russian gauge. It is not clear where the break-of-gauge station will be. The proposed line will also be connected the port town of Gwadar via Dalbadin and Taftan, thus connecting the port town to Central Asia.

China - There is no link with China however, on 28 February 2007 contracts were awarded for feasibility studies on a proposed line from Havelian via the Khunjerab Pass at 4730 m above sea level, to the Chinese railhead at Kashgar, a distance of about 750 km.

Turkmenistan - Via Afghanistan (proposed) – avoiding 4 ft 8 1/2 in (1,435 mm) standard gauge intervening.

Turkey - An Istanbul-Tehran-Islamabad passenger rail service was proposed recently. Meanwhile, a container train service was launched by the former Prime Minister of Pakistan Yousuf Raza Gilani between Islamabad and Istanbul on 14 August 2009. The first train carried 20 containers with a capacity of around 750 t (738 long tons; 827 short tons) and will travel 6,500 km (4,000 mi) from Islamabad, through Tehran, Iran and on to Istanbul in two weeks' time. According to the Minister for Railways Ghulam Ahmad Bilour, after the trial of the container train service, a passenger train will be launched. There are also hopes the route will eventually provide a link to Europe and Central Asia, and carry passengers.

=== Heritage ===
In Ghangha Pur, a 2 ft (610 mm) narrow-gauge horse-drawn tramway is operational. It was first opened in 1898, closed in 1998, and re-opened in 2010.

== Air ==
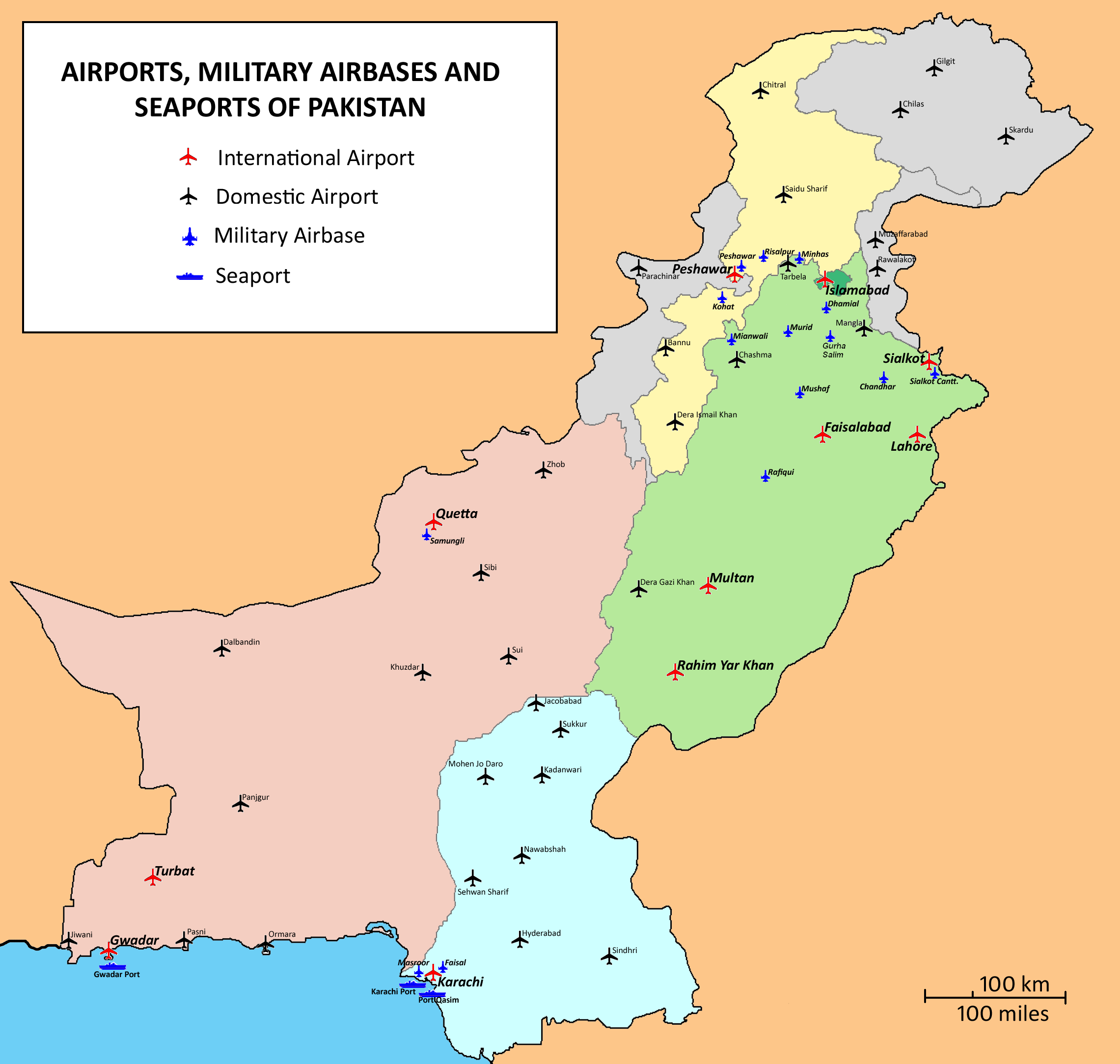
Airports and Seaports of Pakistan

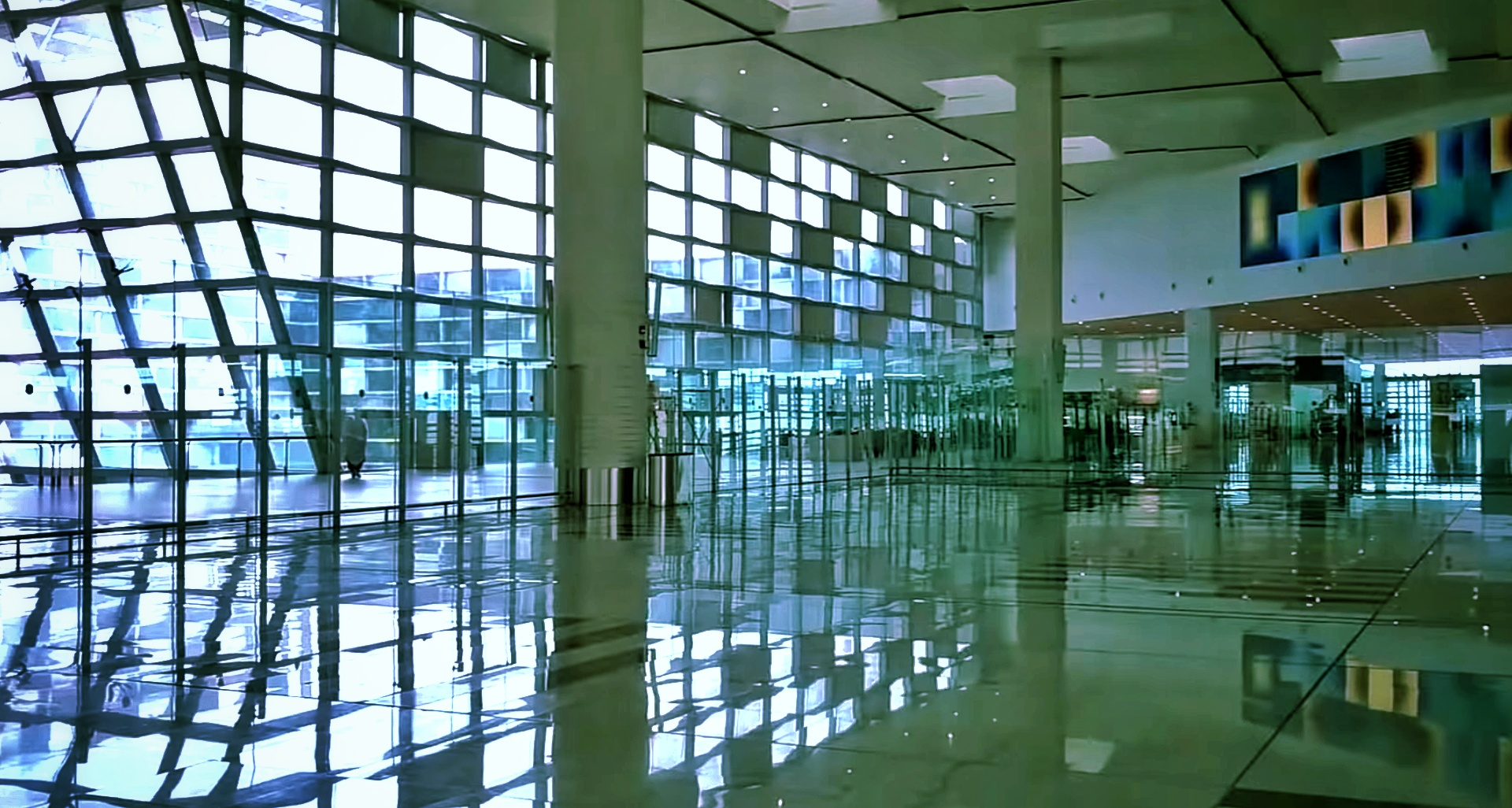
Terminal of Islamabad International Airport

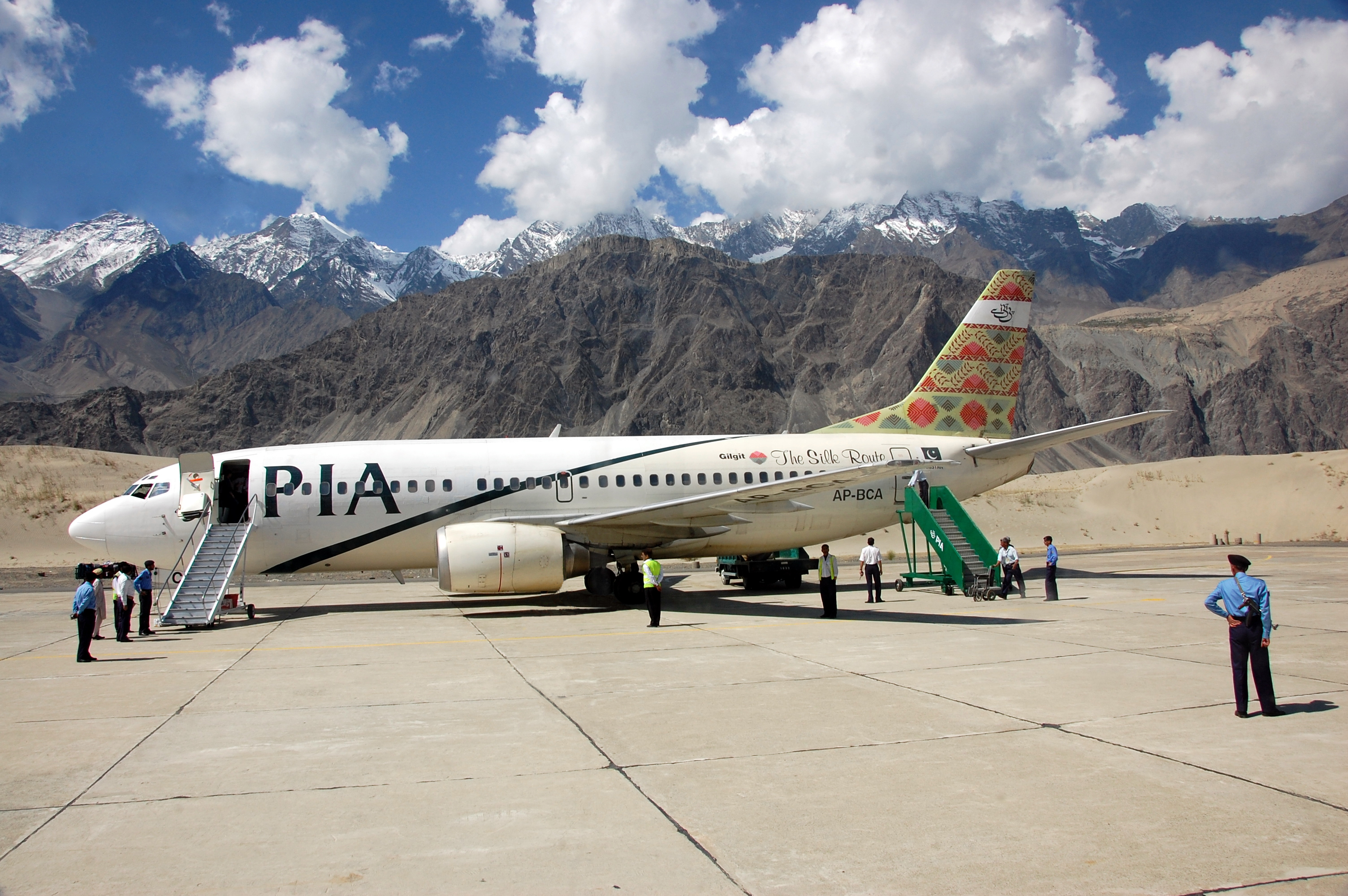
Boeing 737 owned and operated by Pakistan International Airlines (PIA). PIA operates scheduled services to 70 domestic destinations and 34 international destinations in 27 countries.

Pakistan has 151 airports. The major airports are:

- Jinnah International Airport (Karachi)
- Allama Iqbal International Airport (Lahore)
- Islamabad International Airport (Islamabad)
- Bacha Khan International Airport (Peshawar)
- Faisalabad International Airport (Faisalabad)
- Multan International Airport (Multan)
- Skardu International Airport (Skardu)
- Quetta International Airport (Quetta)
- Sialkot International Airport (Sialkot)
- Dera Ghazi Khan International Airport (D.G.Khan)
- Gwadar International Airport (Gwadar)
- Shaikh Zayed International Airport (Rahim Yar Khan)

There are also several smaller airports which have flights to and from the Gulf because of the large Pakistani diaspora working in the region. There are 91 airports with paved runways, of which 14 have runways longer than 3,047 meters. The remaining 48 airports have unpaved runways including one airport with a runway longer than 3,047 meters. Pakistan also has eighteen heliports.

Despite PIA's domination in domestic market there are also 4 other carriers in Pakistan. Most notably Airblue which is the second biggest airline based in Pakistan and only airline which has new generation aircraft with 2 Airbus A321neo-LRs. Serene Air is the only other airline in Pakistan that owns wide-body aircraft with three Airbus A330s. Then there are 2 low-cost carriers with both having 5 Airbus A320s in their fleet: fly Jinnah and Air Sial. The most favourite aircraft in Pakistan is the Airbus A320 family with only Serene air having 4 Boeing 737s instead of the Airbuses.

== Water ==
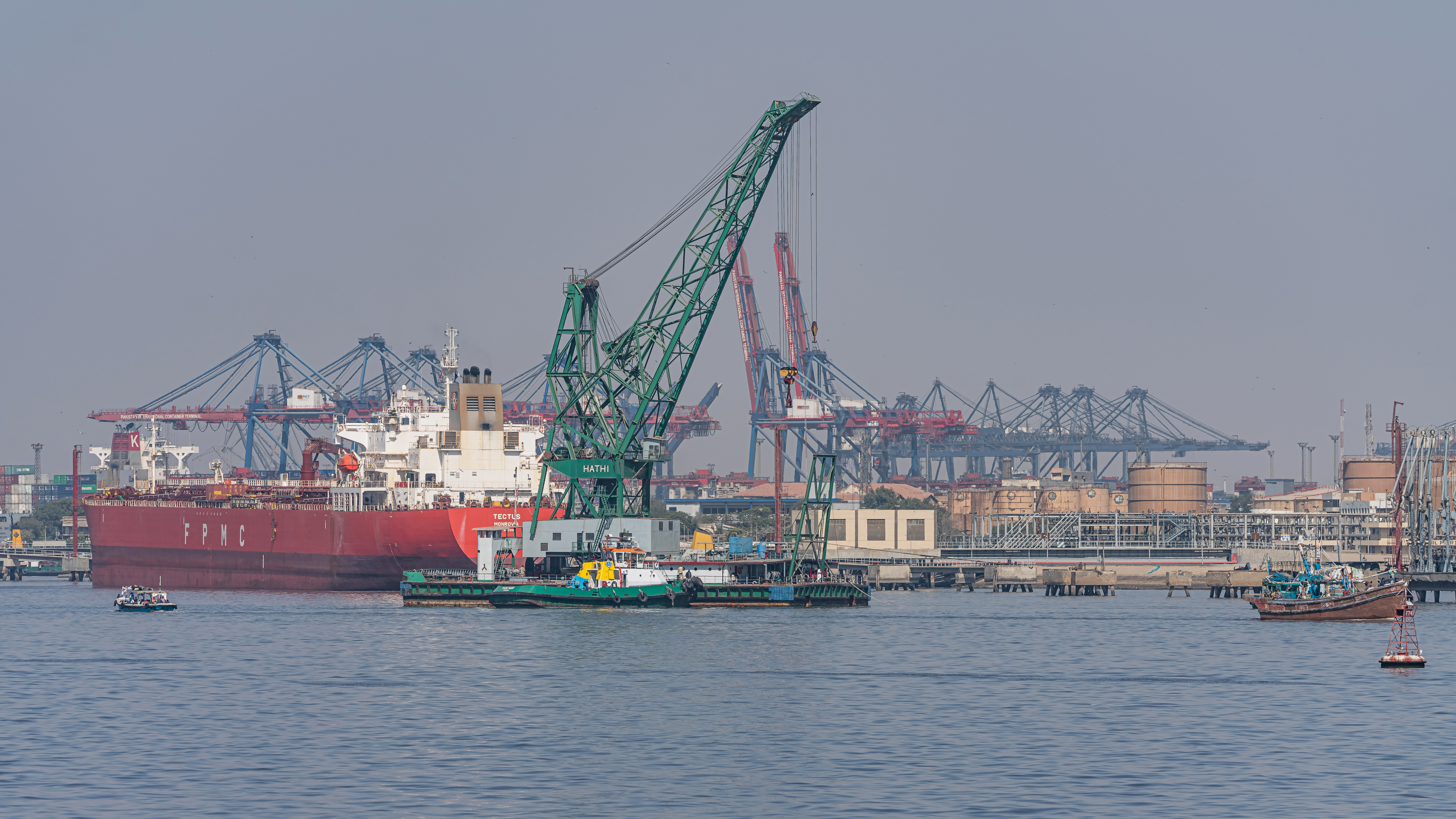
Port of Karachi is one of South Asia's largest and busiest deep-water seaports, handling about 60% of the nation's cargo (25 million tons per annum).

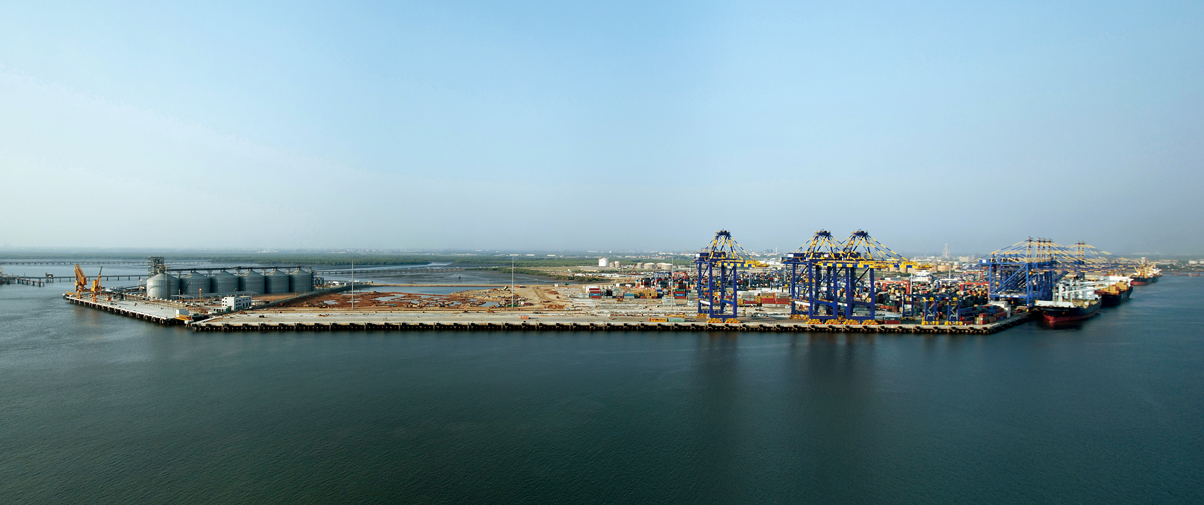
Located in the city of Karachi, Port Qasim is Pakistan's second busiest sea port, handling about 30% of the nation's cargo (14 million tons per annum).

The waterway network in Pakistan is in its infancy, with Karachi being the only major city situated next to the Arabian Sea. Still, plans are being proposed for the development of the waterways in the country along the Indus River and through the Punjab as it would boost employment opportunities and the economic and social development of Pakistan.

- Port of Gwadar – Gwadar, Balochistan
- Port of Karachi – Karachi (City Centre), Sindh

- Karachi International Container Terminal (KICT)
- Pakistan International Container Terminal (PICT)

- Port Qasim – East Karachi, Sindh
- Port of Pasni – Pasni, Balochistan

=== Ferries ===
- Ferry services run between Kimari and Minora Island in Karachi.
- Karachi used to have a ferry connection with City of Mumbai in India until the 1960s, but it was later discontinued when both the countries went into war.
- A cruise service called Gulf Dream Cruise began between Karachi and Dubai in 2006, but it wasn't able to go beyond its first sailing due to visa issues imposed by the UAE authorities.
- In 2020, Pakistan announced its plans to launch a ferry service in near future linking Pakistan through Karachi and Gwadar to Iran, Oman, UAE, and Iraq.

== Pipelines ==
- Length of pipelines for crude oil is 2,011 km (1,250 mi).
- Length of Petroleum products pipeline is 787 km (489 mi).
- Length of Natural gas pipelines is 10,402 km (6,464 mi).

The above information was calculated in 2009.

== China-Pakistan Economic Corridor ==
The China-Pakistan Economic Corridor is an under-construction development program to connect Gwadar Port in southern Pakistan to China's northwestern autonomous region of Xinjiang via highways, railways and pipelines to transport oil and gas. Chinese Premier Li Keqiang was among the first advocates of the project; since then General Secretary of the Chinese Communist Party Xi Jinping, former Pakistani President Asif Ali Zardari and Pakistani prime minister Nawaz Sharif have become strong supporters of the project. When the corridor is constructed, it will serve as a primary gateway for trade between China and the Middle East and Africa; in particular, oil from the Middle East could be offloaded at Gwadar, which is located just outside the mouth of the Persian Gulf, and transported to China through the Baluchistan province in Pakistan. Such a link would vastly shorten the 12,000-kilometre route that Mideast oil supplies must now take to reach Chinese ports.

The project received a major boost when control of Gwadar was transferred to China's state-owned China Overseas Ports Holding in February 2013. Built by Chinese workers and opened in 2007, Gwadar is undergoing a major expansion to turn it into a full-fledged, deep-water commercial port. On 19 February 2014, the South China Morning Post reported that Pakistan and China have signed agreements for constructing an international airport at Gwadar, for upgrading a section of the 1,300-kilometre Karakorum Highway connecting to Islamabad, and for a fibre-optic cable to be laid from the Chinese border to the Pakistani city of Rawalpindi. According to The Diplomat, with the development of the corridor, Central Asia, traditionally an economically closed region owing to its geography and lack of infrastructure, will have greater access to the sea and to the global trade network. Pak-China Economic Corridor Secretariat was inaugurated in Islamabad on August 27, 2013. The CPEC has put a debt burden on Pakistan, paving the way for China to use its "debt-trap diplomacy" and gain access to strategic assets. Therefore, Pakistan is already at high risk due to debt from China. Perhaps, Pakistan would never have imagined that its alliance with China would sink into huge debt. China and Pakistan have both undertaken constructive measures to facilitate the advancement of the CPEC project. However, the ultimate outcome of the corridor's success is intricately tied to Pakistan's internal circumstances. A comprehensive evaluation of the corridor's potential remains challenging until Pakistan addresses its political and security challenges.

== See also ==
- Motorways of Pakistan
- National Highways of Pakistan
- Customised buses and trucks in Pakistan
- Road signs in Pakistan
- List of bridges in Pakistan
- Airlines of Pakistan
- Pakistan International Airlines
- Pakistan Civil Aviation Authority
- Port of Karachi
- History of rail transport in Pakistan
