= 2018 Peshawar suicide bombing =

Terrorist attack in Pakistan

- Part of Insurgency in Khyber Pakhtunkhwa
- Location: 34°00′21″N 71°34′39″E; Yaka Toot, Peshawar, KPK, Pakistan
- Date: 10 July 2018 (PST)
- Target: Haroon Bilour
- Attack type: Suicide bombing
- Weapon: Explosive belt
- Deaths: 22
- Injuries: 75
- Perpetrator: Tehreek-i-Taliban Pakistan
- No. of participants: 1

On 10 July 2018, a suicide bombing occurred at the Awami National Party's workers rally in Yaka Toot area of Peshawar, Khyber Pakhtunkhwa, Pakistan. Haroon Bilour, ANP's candidate for PK-78 and prime target of the attack, was killed as a result of the bombing. The attack left 22 people dead and wounded 75 others. Tehreek-i-Taliban Pakistan claimed responsibility for the attack.

== Background ==
=== Attacks against ANP leaders ===
The leaders of Awami National Party (ANP) have frequently been ambushed by militants. In December 2012, Bashir Ahmad Bilour, leader of ANP and Haroon Bilour's father, was killed by a suicide bomber.

=== Motive ===
The motive behind the assault was to kill the ANP leader Haroon Bilour. Bilour was to contest the next elections from PK-78. On 16 April 2013, a suicide attack claimed by Tehreek-i-Taliban Pakistan (TTP) on ANP election rally that targeted Haroon Bilour, killed 15 people. However, Haroon Bilour was not at the rally.

== Bombing ==
On late night 10 July 2018, Haroon Bilour arrived at Yakatoot area in Peshawar where ANP workers had gathered for a corner meeting. As his vehicle arrived, a loud explosion occurred. Bilour suffered serious injuries and was shifted to hospital where he succumbed to his wounds.

== Aftermath ==
=== Rescue services ===
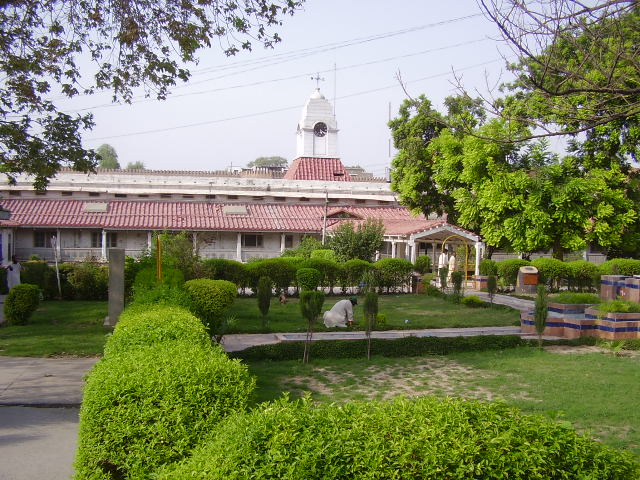
Lady Reading Hospital

Soon after the explosion, the Law enforcement agencies reached the site and initiated investigation. Peshawar's CCPO Qazi Jameel said that nearly 8 kilograms of TNT was used in the bomb. All the deceased and injured were shifted to Lady Reading Hospital. AIG KPK Shafqat Malik said that a suicide bomber blew himself up and Haroon was the target of the attack. Initially the death toll was 13 but later it rose to 21 according to Lady Reading Hospital officials. The attack also left 75 people wounded. Apart from Bilour, the other 17 deceased were identified as Asif Khan, Mohammad Naeem, Mohammad Shoib, Haji Muhammad Gul, Yaseen, Najeebullah, Khan Muhamad, Huzaifa, Abidullah, Arif Hussain, Imran, AKhtar Gul, Zameer Khan, Asrar, Rizwan, Sadiq and Sameen. Two dead bodies remained unidentified. On 12 July 2018, two days after the attack, another person succumbed to his injuries, bringing the number of deaths to 22.

=== Bilour's remains ===
Bilour's body was shifted to his residence at Bilour House. ANP supporters gathered outside his residence and shouted slogans against government for his "failure to provide security".

=== PK-78 elections delay ===
Following the incident, the Election Commission of Pakistan postponed the polls for PK-78, constituency from which Bilour was to contest election.

== Reactions ==
=== Security forces ===
IG KPK Mohammad Tahir formed a seven-member team to probe the incident and directed it to submit report within 7 days. The following day, police conducted raids across the city. Nine units of Police and Quick Reaction Forces (QRF) were deployed at all entry and exit points of the city.

=== Perpetrators ===
Tehreek-i-Taliban Pakistan (TTP) claimed responsibility for the bombing calling the assassination of Bilour "a revenge of previous government" (referring to 2008-2013 tenure of ANP's KPK governance) and also warned the security forces of more attacks.

== Notable victims ==
- Haroon Bilour, former Pakistani politician
