= Haroon Bilour =

Pakistani politician (died 2018)

- ہارون بلور
- Born: 1971 or 1972
- Died: 10 July 2018 (aged 46); Peshawar, Khyber Pakhtunkhwa, Pakistan
- Cause of death: Assassination
- Resting place: Peshawar
- Occupation: Politician
- Political party: Awami National Party
- Spouse: Samar Haroon Bilour
- Children: 2
- Father: Bashir Ahmad Bilour
- Relatives: Ghulam Ahmad Bilour (uncle); Ilyas Ahmed Bilour (uncle); Irfanullah Khan Marwat (father-in-law); Ghulam Ishaq Khan (grandfather-in-law)

Haroon Ahmed Bilour (Urdu: ہارون بلور; c. 1971–2018) was a Pakistani politician from Peshawar, Khyber Pakhtunkhwa. He was the son of renowned politician Bashir Ahmed Bilour. He was killed in a suicide bombing during a party meeting in Peshawar on 10 July 2018.

== Early life and education ==
Haroon Ahmed Bilour was born in 1971 or 1972 as the son of politician Bashir Ahmed Bilour. He had two brothers. His brother Usman died of a cardiac arrest in December 2014.

== Career ==
Bilour was a barrister, and he joined politics following the footsteps of his father Bashir Ahmed Bilour. Haroon Bilour and his father were both candidates for the PK-78 constituency for the Khyber Pakhtunkhwa Assembly.

Bilour and his brother Usman Bashir Bilour contested assembly elections in 2002 and 2008 and lost. Haroon Bilour was once elected as Nazim of Town-1 Peshawar.

In 2007, Bilour, his brother, his father and his uncle were nominated in a case involving the killing of two members of an adversary family. Hostilities emerged between the families back in 1997, when the only son of Bilour's uncle was shot dead at a polling station during by-election on a National Assembly seat. In 2011, a group of elders brought an end to the family dispute at the advice of then-President Asif Ali Zardari.

On 11 October 2013, the Peshawar High Court confirmed pre-arrest bail for Bilour and his uncle Ghulam Ahmad Bilour, a Member of the National Assembly, who were earlier accused of vandalising a women's polling station during the 22 August by-elections in NA-1.

In 2016, Bilour's security guards allegedly assaulted a Pakistan Tehreek-e-Insaf (PTI) worker. Bilour also had a case registered against the PTI worker, claiming that the PTI worker had aimed a gun at him before Bilour's security guards protected him.

In June 2018, Bilour opposed the Town-1 Peshawar administration's ban on the display of election posters and banners on historic gates of the city, on the conserved city wall and on the Gorkhatri Archaeological Complex. He argued the code of conduct about the display of flags and banners was the jurisdiction of the Election Commission of Pakistan.

=== Attacks by Tehreek-i-Taliban Pakistan ===
Awami National Party (ANP) was the main target in General Election 2013, and hundreds of party supporters were killed. Several months ahead of the election, Bilour's father was killed by a suicide bomber while he was moving towards his home after attending a party meeting in Peshawar. Tehreek-i-Taliban Pakistan (TTP) claimed responsibility for the attack.

Bilour survived two suicide attacks targeted at him. In April 2013, a suicide attack claimed by TTP on an ANP election rally that targeted Bilour and his uncle killed 18 other people. However, Haroon Bilour was not present at the rally.

Haroon Bilour's uncle MNA Ghulam Bilour was attacked by bomb in 2013, as his SUV pulled up to a Peshawar guesthouse for a rally. Haroon Bilour was headed to the site, but stopped his car about 100 feet (30 m) away to chat with a friend. Supporters pulled his uncle out of the car seconds before it caught fire.

Fearing a low election turnout because of the attacks on the ANP, Bilour said that the Election Commission of Pakistan "should ensure that security is provided for voters so they can cast their ballot without fear".

In 2017, Bilour said that he was "proud of the sacrifices the people, police and armed forces have rendered for the cause of peace".

=== Personal life and death ===
Bilour was married to Samar Haroon Bilour, the daughter of former minister of Sindh, Irfanullah Khan Marwat, and grand daughter of former President of Pakistan, late Ghulam Ishaq Khan.

Bilour and 21 others were killed in a suicide bombing by Tehrik-i-Taliban Pakistan, a terrorist group in Khyber Pakhtunkhwa, during his campaign rally in Peshawar for the 2018 Khyber Pakhtunkhwa provincial election.

On late night 10 July 2018, Haroon Bilour arrived at Yakatoot area in Peshawar where ANP workers had gathered for a corner meeting. As his vehicle arrived, a loud explosion occurred. Bilour suffered serious injuries and was shifted to hospital where he succumbed to his wounds.

Bilour's body was shifted to his residence at Bilour House. ANP supporters gathered outside his residence and shouted slogans against government for his "failure to provide security". Haroon Bilour's son Danyal was 20 at the time of Haroon's death. Thousands of people from different walks of life attended the funeral of Bilour in Peshawar. According to a senior police officer, about 30,000 people attended the funeral of slain ANP leader. Over 500 police personnel were deployed for funeral security of slain leader and bomb disposal squad was also called to clear the route from Bilour's house to the funeral ground.

== Posthumous ==
Following the incident, the Election Commission of Pakistan postponed the polls for PK-78, constituency from which Bilour was to contest election.

Tehrik-i-Taliban Pakistan later claimed the responsibility that they had targeted the party meeting which killed Bilour. Tehrik-i-Taliban Pakistan termed this target a revenge of Operation Rah-e-Haq, which was carried out when Awami National Party was the ruling party in Khyber Pakhtunkhwa. TTP also warned the security forces of more attacks.
