= Ilyas Ahmed Bilour =

Pakistani politician (1940–2024)

- الیاس احمد بلور

Member of the Senate of Pakistan
- In office March 1993 – March 2018

Personal details
- Born: 1 July 1940 Peshawar, North-West Frontier Province, British India
- Died: 16 November 2024 (aged 84) Peshawar, Khyber Pakhtunkhwa, Pakistan
- Party: ANP (2012–2024)
- Relatives: Ghulam Ahmad Bilour (brother); Bashir Ahmad Bilour (brother); Haroon Bilour (nephew)

Ilyas Ahmed Bilour (Urdu: الیاس احمد بلور; 1 July 1940 – 16 November 2024) was a Pakistani politician who was a member of Senate of Pakistan from March 2012.

== Early life and education ==
Bilour was born into a political family on 1 July 1940 in Peshawar, Khyber Pakhtunkhwa from where he got his early education, earning his Faculty of Arts degree from the Edwardes College.

He held a degree of Bachelor of Arts which he received from the University of Karachi in 1969. He also held the degree of Master of Business Administration (MBA) in Marketing which he obtained from Al-Khair University, Azad Jammu and Kashmir in 1999.

== Business career ==
Bilour served as the managing director of the company Flour and General Mills (Pvt.) Ltd.

== Political career ==
Bilour was elected to the Senate of Pakistan as a candidate of Awami National Party in the 2012 Pakistani Senate election.

== Death ==
Bilour died from kidney disease on 12 November 2024, at the age of 84.
