= Asif Khan (Peshawar politician) =

Pakistani politician (born 1978)

Member of the National Assembly of Pakistan
- Incumbent
- Assumed office 29 February 2024
- Constituency: NA-32 Peshawar-V

Member of the Provincial Assembly of Khyber Pakhtunkhwa
- In office 13 August 2018 – 18 January 2023
- Constituency: PK-76 (Peshawar-XI)

Personal details
- Party: PTI (2018-present)

Asif Khan is a Pakistani politician who has been a member of the National Assembly of Pakistan since February 2024. He was previously a member of the Provincial Assembly of Khyber Pakhtunkhwa from August 2018 till January 2023.

== Political career ==
He was elected to the Provincial Assembly of Khyber Pakhtunkhwa as a candidate of Pakistan Tehreek-e-Insaf from Constituency PK-76 (Peshawar-XI) in the 2018 Pakistani general election.
