= Road signs in Pakistan =

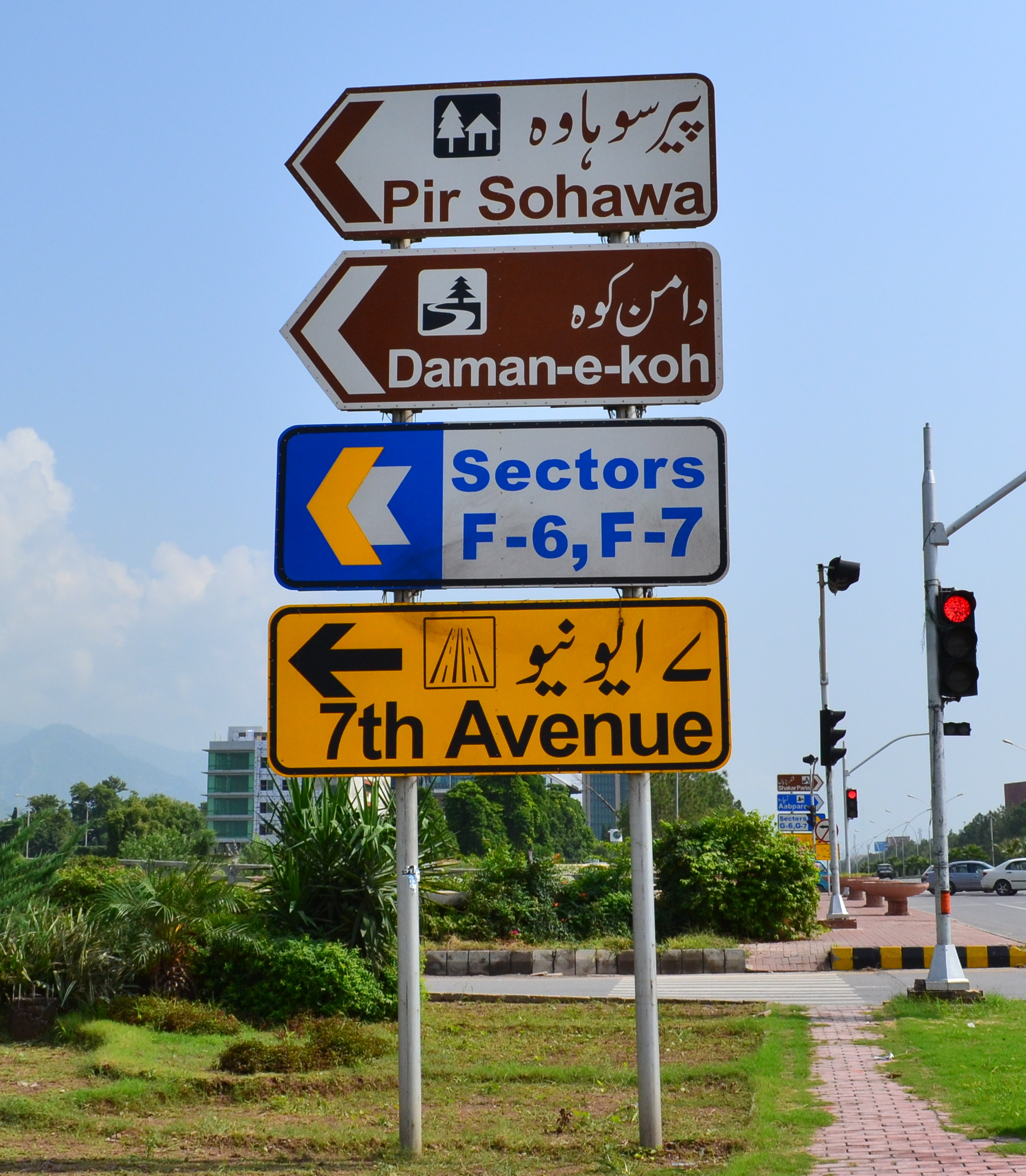
Road signs in Islamabad

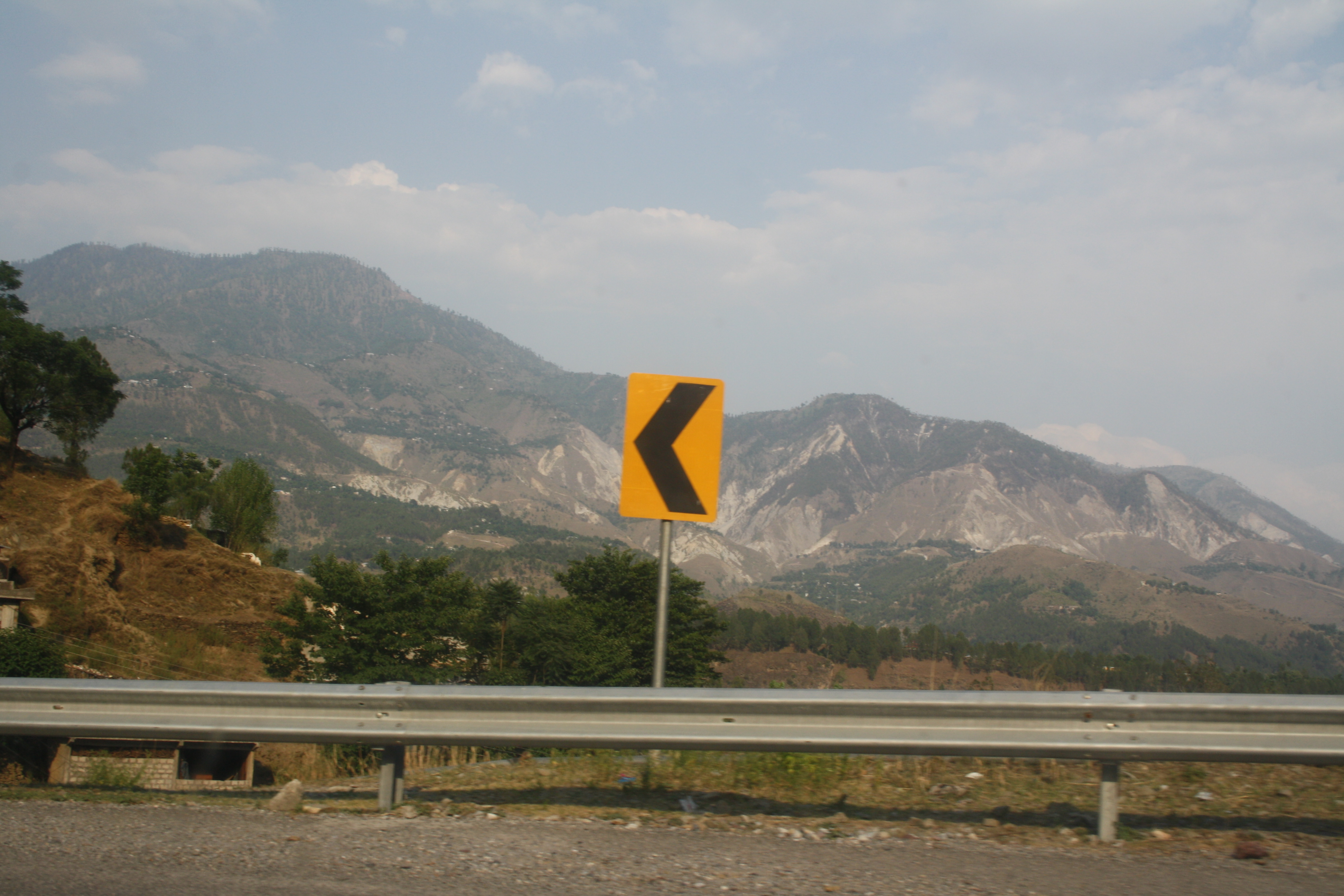
Traffic sign in Naran

Road signs in Pakistan are regulated in the Manual of Signs, Signals and Markings published by the National Transport Research Centre (مرکز قومی تحقیقات حمل و نقل) and the Planning Commission in 1989. They are typically bilingual, displaying text in English and Urdu. However, some signs incorporate a provincial language. They generally conform to the Vienna Convention on Road Traffic and Vienna Convention on Road Signs and Signals. Pakistan follows left-hand traffic rules, consistent with several other Commonwealth countries. On 14 January 1980, Pakistan acceded to the Vienna Convention on Road Signs and Signals.

== Gallery ==
=== Warning signs ===
Stop

Give way

Give way to oncoming vehicles

Slow down

Road closed

No entry

No bicycles

No motorcycles

No trucks

No pedestrians

No hand carts

No right turn

No left turn

No U-turn

No overtaking

No overtaking by trucks

Maximum speed limit (55 km/h)

Stop at police checkpoint

Stop at customs

No parking

End of speed limit, return to national applicable limit

End of no overtaking

End of give way to oncoming traffic

End of all previous restrictions

Mandatory direction

Mandatory direction

Mandatory direction

Turn right

Turn left

Proceed forward or turn right

Proceed forward or turn left

Pass on the left

Pass on the right

Mandatory roundabout

Lane movement

Lane movement

Divided highway starts

Divided highway ends

Mandatory route for cycles

Mandatory route for pedestrians

Mandatory route for trucks

=== Information signs ===
Dangerous curve to the right

Dangerous curve to the left

Dangerous curve, first to the right

Dangerous curve, first to the left

Steep ascent

Steep descent

Left lane ends

Road narrows

Opening bridge

Quayside or riverbank

Uneven road

Bump

Dip

Slippery surface

Loose stones

Rockfall

Pedestrian crossing ahead

Children

Cyclists

Livestock animals

Wild animals

Roadworks

Traffic signals

Low-flying aircraft

Sidewinds

Two-way traffic

Minor road crossing ahead

Offset crossroads

Offset crossroads

Minor side road ahead

Minor side road ahead

Crossroads

Y-intersection

Level crossing without barriers ahead

Level crossing with barriers ahead

U turning traffic ahead

Narrow bridge

Roundabout ahead

Merging traffic

Merging traffic

Major road crossing ahead

T-intersection

Tunnel

Other danger

Danger ahead

Railway crossing
Signals out of order

== See also ==
- Transport in Pakistan
- National Highways of Pakistan
- Road signs in Turkey
