= Shokat Ali (politician) =

Pakistani politician

Shaukat Ali
- شوکت علی

Member of the National Assembly of Pakistan
- In office 13 August 2018 – 29 July 2022
- Constituency: NA-31 (Peshawar-V)

Personal details
- Born: Peshawar, Khyber Pakhtunkhwa, Pakistan
- Party: PMLN (2025-present)
- Other political affiliations: PTI-P (2023-2025); PTI (2018-2023)

Shaukat Ali is a Pakistani politician who was a member of the National Assembly of Pakistan from 2018 to 2022.

== Political career ==
Ali was elected to the National Assembly from NA-31 Peshawar-V as a candidate of Pakistan Tehreek-e-Insaf (PTI) in the 2018 Pakistani general election. He received 87,895 votes and defeated the incumbent MNA, Ghulam Ahmad Bilour of the Awami National Party (ANP).

On 10 April 2022, after Prime Minister Imran Khan lost a vote of no-confidence in the Pakistani parliament, Ali resigned from the assembly on Khan's orders. The new government did not initially accept the resignations of several departing members for fear of reducing the number of members. However, it accepted the resignations of eleven, including Ali, on July 28. Later, by-elections were held again for Ali's seat. Khan made a surprising move to stand on his own in all of the by-election seats.

== See also ==
- List of members of the 15th National Assembly of Pakistan
