= NA-32 Peshawar-V =

Constituency of the National Assembly of Pakistan

- Constituency for the National Assembly of Pakistan
- Region: Peshawar city (partly) of Peshawar District
- Electorate: 588,973

Current constituency
- Created: 1970
- Party: Pakistan Tehreek-e-Insaf
- Member: Asif Khan
- Created from: NA-1 Peshawar-I; NA-3 Peshawar-III

NA-32 Peshawar-V (این اے-32، پشاور-5) is a constituency for the National Assembly of Pakistan.

== Area ==
During the delimitation of 2018, NA-31 (Peshawar-V) acquired areas from two former constituencies namely NA-1 (Peshawar-I), and NA-3 (Peshawar-III) with most coming from NA-1 (Peshawar-I), the areas of Peshawar which are part of this constituency are listed below alongside the former constituency name from which they were acquired:

Areas acquired from NA-1 Peshawar-I

- Dalazak Road
- Haji Camp
- Afghan Colony
- Faqeerabad
- Zaryab Colony
- Gulbahar
- Sikandar Town
- Sikandar Pura
- New Rampura Gate
- Sabz Pir Road
- T.B. Hospital
- Ganj Bazar
- Mohallah Jataan
- Chowk Yadgar
- Shah Qabool
- Ramdas
- Beri Bagh
- Murshid Abad
- Khan Mast Colony

Areas acquired from NA-3 Peshawar-III

- Bashir Abad
- Coca-Cola Factory Charsadda Road

== Members of Parliament ==
=== 1970–1977: NW-1 Peshawar-I ===
| Election | Member | Party |
|---|---|---|
| 1970 | Khan Abdul Qayoum Khan | PML(Qayyum) |

=== 1977–2002: NA-1 Peshawar-I ===
| Election | Member | Party |
|---|---|---|
| 1977 | Muhammad Yusuf Khattak | ML(Q) |
| 1985 | Muhammad Younis Elahi | Independent |
| 1988 | Aftab Ahmad Khan Sherpao | PPP |
| 1988 by-election | Ghulam Ahmad Bilour | ANP |
| 1990 | Ghulam Ahmad Bilour | ANP |
| 1993 | Syed Zafar Ali Shah | PPP |
| 1997 | Ghulam Ahmad Bilour | ANP |

=== 2002–2018: NA-1 Peshawar-I ===
| Election | Member | Party |
|---|---|---|
| 2002 | Shabir Ahmad Khan | MMA |
| 2008 | Ghulam Ahmad Bilour | ANP |
| 2013 | Imran Khan | PTI |
| 2013 by-election | Ghulam Ahmad Bilour | ANP |

=== 2018–2022: NA-31 Peshawar-V ===
| Election | Member | Party |
|---|---|---|
| 2018 | Shaukat Ali | PTI |

=== 2023–present: NA-32 Peshawar-V ===
| Election | Member | Party |
|---|---|---|
| 2024 | Asif Khan | SIC |

== 2002 general election ==
General Elections were held on 10 October 2002. Shabir Ahmad of Muttahida Majlis-e-Amal won this seat with 37,179 votes.

All Candidates receiving over 1,000 votes are listed here.

2002 General Election: NA-1 (Peshawar-I)
| Party | Candidate | Votes | % | ±% |
|---|---|---|---|---|
| MMA | Shabir Ahmad | 37,179 | 56.64 | |
| ANP | Usman Bashir Bilour | 35,675 | 54.53 | |
| PTI | Sajid Abdullah | 2,029 | 3.09 | |
| Independent | Muhammad Khurshid Khan Advocate | 1,537 | 2.34 | |
| PML(Q) | Muhammed Muazzam Butt | 1,417 | 2.16 | |
| PWP | Rabia Mufti Advocate | 478 | 0.73 | |
| Majority | | 14,177 | 21.60 | |
| Turnout | | 65,642 | 28.73 | |
| MMA gain from ANP | | Swing | | |

A total of 1,552 votes were rejected.

== 2008 general election ==
General Elections were held on 18 February 2008. Haji Ghulam Ahmad Bilour of the Awami National Party won this seat with 44,210 votes.

All candidates receiving over 1,000 votes are listed here.

2008 General Election: NA-1 (Peshawar-I)
| Party | Candidate | Votes | % | ±% |
|---|---|---|---|---|
| ANP | Ghulam Ahmad Bilour | 44,210 | 50.05 | +15.01 |
| PPP | Ayub Shah | 37,682 | 42.66 | |
| MMA | Haji Abdul Jalil Jan | 4,103 | 4.65 | −51.99 |
| Majority | | 6,528 | 7.39 | |
| Turnout | | 88,325 | 22.97 | −5.76 |
| ANP gain from MMA | | Swing | ▲33.50 | |

A total of 629 votes were rejected.

== 2013 general election ==
General Elections were held on 11 May 2013. Imran Khan of Pakistan Tehreek-e-Insaf won this seat with 90,500 votes.

All candidates receiving over 1,000 votes are listed here.

2013 General Election: NA-1 (Peshawar-I)
| Party | Candidate | Votes | % | ±% |
|---|---|---|---|---|
| PTI | Imran Khan | 90,500 | 61.97 | +61.97 |
| ANP | Ghulam Ahmad Bilour | 24,468 | 16.75 | −33.30 |
| PPP | Muhammad Zulfiqar Afghani | 7,121 | 4.88 | −37.78 |
| JI | Shabir Ahmad Khan | 7,051 | 4.83 | +4.83 |
| MDM | Hazrat Muhammad alias Babo Maavia | 4,827 | 3.31 | +3.31 |
| JUI (F) | Haji Shah Nawaz | 4,738 | 3.24 | +3.24 |
| PML(N) | Muhammad Afzal Khan Panyala | 4,232 | 2.90 | +2.90 |
| QWP | Jan Alam Khan Paracha | 1,694 | 1.16 | +1.16 |
| Majority | | 66,032 | 45.22 | +45.22 |
| Turnout | | 146,044 | 46.18 | +23.21 |
| PTI gain from ANP | | Swing | +47.64 | |

A total of 2,103 votes were rejected.

== 2013 by-election ==
The elected member, Imran Khan (leader of PTI), won three separate seats in the General Election, and he chose to keep NA-56. This resulted in him vacating this seat and triggering a by-election, which took place on 22 August 2013. Alhaj Ghulam of the Awami National Party won this seat with 59,456 votes.

All candidates receiving over 1000 votes are listed here.

2013 Bye-election: NA-1 (Peshawar-I)
| Party | Candidate | Votes | % | ±% |
|---|---|---|---|---|
| ANP | Ghulam Ahmad Bilour | 59,456 | 79.65 | +30.59 |
| PTI | Gul Badshah | 28,911 | 39.81 | −22.16 |
| MDM | Muhammad Ibrahim Qasmi | 6,673 | 9.19 | +5.88 |
| Independent | Samad Mursalin | 1,770 | 2.44 | |
| Majority | | 5,475 | 7.53 | |
| Turnout | | 72,631 | 22.96 | −23.22 |
| ANP gain from PTI | | Swing | ▲26.36 | |

== 2018 general election ==
General elections were held on 25 July 2018.

General election 2018: NA-31 (Peshawar-V)
| Party | Candidate | Votes | % | ±% |
|---|---|---|---|---|
| PTI | Shaukat Ali | 87,895 | 54.60 | ▲14.79 |
| ANP | Ghulam Ahmad Bilour | 42,476 | 26.39 | ▼53.26 |
| Others | Others (eleven candidates) | 30,613 | 19.01 | |
| Turnout | | 164,680 | 42.20 | |
| Total valid votes | | 160,984 | 97.76 | |
| Rejected ballots | | 3,696 | 2.24 | |
| Majority | | 45,419 | 28.21 | |
| Registered electors | | 390,211 | | |
| PTI gain from ANP | | | | |

== 2022 by-election ==
A by-election was held on 16 October 2022 due to the resignation of Shaukat Ali, the previous MNA from this seat.

By-election 2022: NA-31 (Peshawar-V)
| Party | Candidate | Votes | % | ±% |
|---|---|---|---|---|
| PTI | Imran Khan | 57,818 | 61.14 | ▲6.54 |
| ANP | Ghulam Ahmad Bilour | 32,252 | 34.10 | ▲7.71 |
| JI | Muhammad Aslam | 3,816 | 4.03 | N/A^{†} |
| Others | Others (five candidates) | 687 | 0.73 | |
| Turnout | | 95,953 | 20.28 | ▼21.92 |
| Rejected ballots | | 1,380 | 1.44 | ▼0.80 |
| Majority | | 25,566 | 27.03 | ▼1.18 |
| Registered electors | | 473,180 | | |
| PTI hold | | | | |

^{†}JI previously contested as part of MMA. JUI(F), which also previously contested as part of MMA, did not contest this election.

== 2024 general election ==
A general election was held on 8 February 2024. Asif Khan won the election with 122,792 votes.

General election 2024: NA-32 Peshawar-V
| Party | Candidate | Votes | % | ±% |
|---|---|---|---|---|
| PTI | Asif Khan (Note: Filed nomination papers as PTI candidate but ECP allowed him to run as an Independent) | 122,792 | 55.69 | ▼5.45 |
| ANP | Ghulam Ahmad Bilour | 45,846 | 20.79 | ▼13.31 |
| JUI (F) | Hussain Ahmad Madni | 17,665 | 8.01 | N/A |
| PPP | Abid Ullah Khan | 10,520 | 4.77 | N/A |
| Others | Others (twenty-one candidates) | 23,667 | 10.73 | |
| Turnout | | 226,045 | 38.38 | ▲18.10 |
| Rejected ballots | | 5,555 | 2.46 | |
| Majority | | 76,946 | 34.90 | ▲7.87 |
| Registered electors | | 588,973 | | |

== See also ==
- NA-31 Peshawar-IV
- NA-33 Nowshera-I
