= Samar Haroon Bilour =

Pakistani politician

Member of the Provincial Assembly of Khyber Pakhtunkhwa
- In office 24 October 2018 – 18 January 2023
- Constituency: PK-78 (Peshawar-XIII)

Personal details
- Party: PMLN (2025-present)
- Other political affiliations: ANP (2018-2025)
- Spouse: Haroon Bilour
- Relations: Ghulam Ishaq Khan (grandfather); Bashir Ahmad Bilour (father-in-law)
- Parent: Irfanullah Khan Marwat (father)

Samar Haroon Bilour is a Pakistani politician who had been a member of the Provincial Assembly of Khyber Pakhtunkhwa from October 2018 till January 2023.

== Political career ==
Samar was elected to the Provincial Assembly of Khyber Pakhtunkhwa as a candidate of Awami National Party (ANP) from the constituency PK-78 in the 2018 Pakistani by-elections held on 14 October 2018. She defeated Muhammad Irfan Abdul Salman of Pakistan Tehreek-e-Insaf (PTI). Samar garnered 20,916 votes while her closest rival secured 16,819 votes. With this election, Samar became the first woman to be elected on a general seat of Khyber Pakhtunkhwa assembly in sixteen years. She became provincial Secretary Information of Awami National Party Khyber Pakhtunkhwa on 4 June 2020.
