= Bashir Ahmad Bilour =

Pakistani politician (1943–2012)

- بشیر احمد بلور
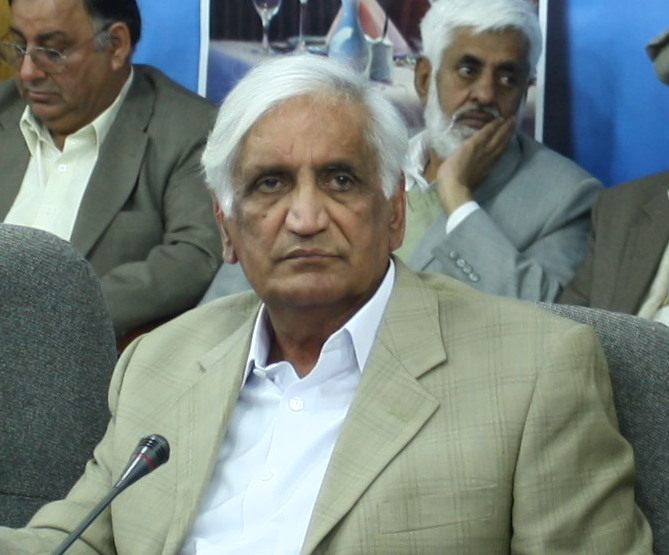
- Bashir Ahmad Bilour
- Born: 1 August 1943
- Died: 22 December 2012 (aged 69)
- Occupations: Provincial MPA, Senior Minister, Businessperson,
- Years active: 1970–2012
- Political party: Awami National Party
- Children: Haroon Bilour
- Relatives: Ghulam Ahmad Bilour (brother); Ilyas Ahmed Bilour (brother); Samar Haroon Bilour (daughter-in-law)

Bashir Ahmad Bilour (Pashto: بشیر احمد بلور; 1 August 1943 – 22 December 2012) was a Pakistani member of the provincial assembly of Khyber-Pakhtunkhwa and Senior Minister for Local Government and Rural Development of Khyber-Pakhtunkhwa.

== Early life and education ==
Bashir Ahmad Bilour was born on 1 August 1943 in the Khyber Pakhtunkhwa province of Pakistan to father Bilour Din. He belongs to a prominent political and social Kakazai family of Peshawar.

Bilour had a bachelor's degree in law. He was a member of Peshawar High Court Bar as a lawyer and took part in active politics from the platform of Awami National Party since 1970.

== Political life ==
In the 1990 elections, Bashir Bilour was elected as a member of the provincial assembly of Khyber-Pakhtunkhwa for the first time with majority of the votes, (over 4000) from PF-3, a constituency of Peshawar City. He remained MPA for 5 consecutive times, from 1990 - 2012 until his martyrdom bashir bilour remained in parliament and was part of the cabinet as minister 4 times for KPK then NWFP, He was the parliamentary leader and was the only MPA of ANP even after the MMA wave when Ghulam Ahmad Bilour and many others lost.

== Death and funeral ==
On 22 December 2012, Bilour was leaving after attending a meeting of ANP workers at a private residence in Peshawar, when he was attacked and critically injured by a suicide bomber at 6:15 pm. He was taken to Lady Reading Hospital where he died at 7:40 pm. His secretary, Noor Muhammad, was also killed in the blast. This was the 5th attack on him and, as was usual for Bilour, he had no guards with him. The funeral prayer for him was held at Colonel Sher Khan Army Stadium on 23 December 2012 with at least 20,000 people despite threats. The city was closed as he was buried at Syed Hasan Pir graveyard in Peshawar.
