= Irfanullah Khan Marwat =

Pakistani politician

- Constituency: Karachi

Personal details
- Born: 31 August 1950 (age 75) Karachi, Sindh, Pakistan
- Party: GDA (2017-present)
- Children: Samar Haroon Bilour
- Education: Institute of Business Administration (English Language Course)
- Profession: Businessman/Politician

Irfanullah Khan Marwat (Urdu: عرفان اللہ خان مروت, born 1950) is a Pakistani politician. He has served as a member of the Provincial Assembly of Sindh and has been appointed as a Provincial Minister in Sindh, Pakistan several times. Irfanullah Khan Marwat has held numerous portfolios in the Sindh Government since 1989 including transport, health, home, education and mines and mineral.

He is one of the sons-in-law of former President of Pakistan Ghulam Ishaq Khan and rose to prominence in the early 90s under the Chief Ministership of Jam Sadiq Ali. Irfan Marwat is a graduate of Institute of Business Administration (IBA) Karachi and is well known among the political circles of Pakistan. Irfanullah Khan Marwat was elected again as a member of the Provincial Assembly of Sindh on 11 May 2013. Irfanullah Khan Marwat, is member of Pakistan Muslim League (N) and elected from PS-114.

== See also ==
- Bannu

== Sources ==
- www.khyber.org retrieved 10 June 2013
