= Ghulam Ahmad Bilour =

Pakistani politician

- غلام احمد بلور

Minister for Railway
- In office 4 November 2008 – 18 March 2013
- President: Asif Ali Zardari
- Prime Minister: Yusuf Raza Gillani
- Preceded by: Sardar Mehtab Ahmed Khan
- Succeeded by: Dr. Abdul Malik Kasi
- In office 10 September 1991 – 18 July 1993
- President: Ghulam Ishaq Khan
- Prime Minister: Nawaz Sharif
- Preceded by: Mir Hazar Khan Bijarani
- Succeeded by: Ahmad Faruque

Member of the National Assembly of Pakistan
- In office 30 August 2013 – 31 May 2018
- Constituency: NA-1 (Peshawar-I)
- In office 17 March 2008 – 17 March 2013
- Constituency: NA-1 (Peshawar-I)
- In office 14 February 1997 – 12 October 1999
- Constituency: NA-1 (Peshawar-I)
- In office 25 November 1988 – 16 October 1993
- Constituency: NA-1 (Peshawar-I)

Member of the Senate of Pakistan
- In office 1975–1977

Personal details
- Born: 25 December 1939 (age 86) Peshawar, North-West Frontier Province, British India
- Other political affiliations: ANP (1975-2024)
- Relatives: Bashir Ahmad Bilour (brother); Ilyas Ahmed Bilour (brother); Haroon Bilour (nephew)

Ghulam Ahmad Bilour (Urdu: غلام احمد بلور; born 25 December 1939) is a Pakistani politician who served as a member of the National Assembly of Pakistan from 2008 to 2018. He additionally served as Federal Minister for Railways twice and as Federal Minister for Local Government and Rural Development once.

== Early life and education ==
Bilour was born in an old Hindko-speaking merchant family on 25 December 1939 in Peshawar, British India. He received his early education from Khudad Model School and Islamia School Peshawar, He then studied at Edwardes College.

The Bilour belongs to a well-known and wealthy business family. He is popularly known as Haji Sahab in Peshawar.

== Political career ==
Bilour participated in the election campaign of Fatima Jinnah in the 1965 Pakistani presidential election.

He began his political career after joining the Awami National Party (ANP) in the 1970s, and was elected to the Senate of Pakistan in 1975.

He ran for the seat of the National Assembly of Pakistan in the 1988 Pakistani general election from Constituency NA-1 (Peshawar-I), but was unsuccessful and lost the seat to Aftab Ahmad Khan Sherpao. However he re-ran for the seat in by-elections held following the 1988 and was elected to the National Assembly by winning it for the first time.

He was re-elected to the National Assembly for the second time in the 1990 Pakistani general election from Constituency NA-1 (Peshawar-I) after defeating Benazir Bhutto. Following the election, he was appointed as the Federal Minister for Railways, a position he held from 1991 to 1993.

He ran for the seat of the National Assembly of Pakistan in the 1993 Pakistani general election from Constituency NA-1 (Peshawar-I), but was unsuccessful and lost the seat to Syed Zafar Ali Shah.

He was re-elected to the National Assembly in the 1997 Pakistani general election from Constituency NA-1 (Peshawar-I). He didn't contest for seat of the National Assembly in the 2002 Pakistani general election.

DAWN reported that he has been jailed several times during his political career. Most notably in 2007 when he was nominated in the murder case of Syed Qammar Abbas. Bilour denied the charge. Earlier in 1997, Syed Qammar Abbas was nominated in a murder case of the son of Bilour.

He was re-elected to the National Assembly from Constituency NA-1 (Peshawar-I) in the 2008 Pakistani general election. Following the election, he was appointed as the Federal Minister for Local Government and Rural Development. He was then appointed Federal Minister for Railways in November 2008.

DAWN reported that Bilour during his tenure as Minister for Railways was criticised and was alleged for corruption. In 2012, Bilour was named as an accused in a multi-billion scrap scandal, which was investigated by the National Accountability Bureau (NAB).

He ran for the seat of the National Assembly of Pakistan in the 2013 Pakistani general election from Constituency NA-1 (Peshawar-I), but was unsuccessful and lost the seat to Imran Khan However he re-ran for the seat in by-elections held in July 2013 and was elected to the National Assembly by winning it.

He ran for the seat of the National Assembly from Constituency NA-31 (Peshawar-V) as a candidate of ANP in the 2018 Pakistani general election but was unsuccessful. He received 42,476 votes and lost the seat to Shokat Ali, a candidate of PTI.

He ran for the seat of the National Assembly from Constituency NA-31 (Peshawar-V) as a candidate of ANP in the 2022 Pakistan by-elections but was unsuccessful. He received 32,252 votes and lost the seat to Imran Khan.

=== Calling for assassinations ===
In 2012, during his tenure as Federal Minister for Railways, he offered a US$100,000 reward for the assassination of the maker of an anti-Islam film, the Innocence of Muslims. He also sought the support of members of the Taliban and al Qaeda and was quoted saying "that if members of the banned militant organisations kill the maker of the blasphemous movie, they will also be rewarded." Following the statement of Bilour, he was criticised and his party ANP distanced itself from the statement of Bilour, however ANP decided not to take any action against Bilour. In response the Tehrik-i-Taliban Pakistan said they were allowing Bilour an "amnesty" from their hit list because his views "represent the true spirit of Islam."

In 2015, during his tenure as a member of the National Assembly, he announced a $200,000 bounty for the head of the owner of French satirical weekly Charlie Hebdo that republished the Jyllands-Posten Muhammad cartoons, and $100,000 compensation for the families of those who killed 11 people during the Charlie Hebdo shooting in Paris.

== Personal life ==
Bilour has been married. In 1997, his only son Shabir Ahmed Bilour was assassinated.
