= Asghar Khan =

First native Pakistani Air Chief (1921-2018)

Asghar Khan HPk HQA MA KCCT NeT
- اصغر خان
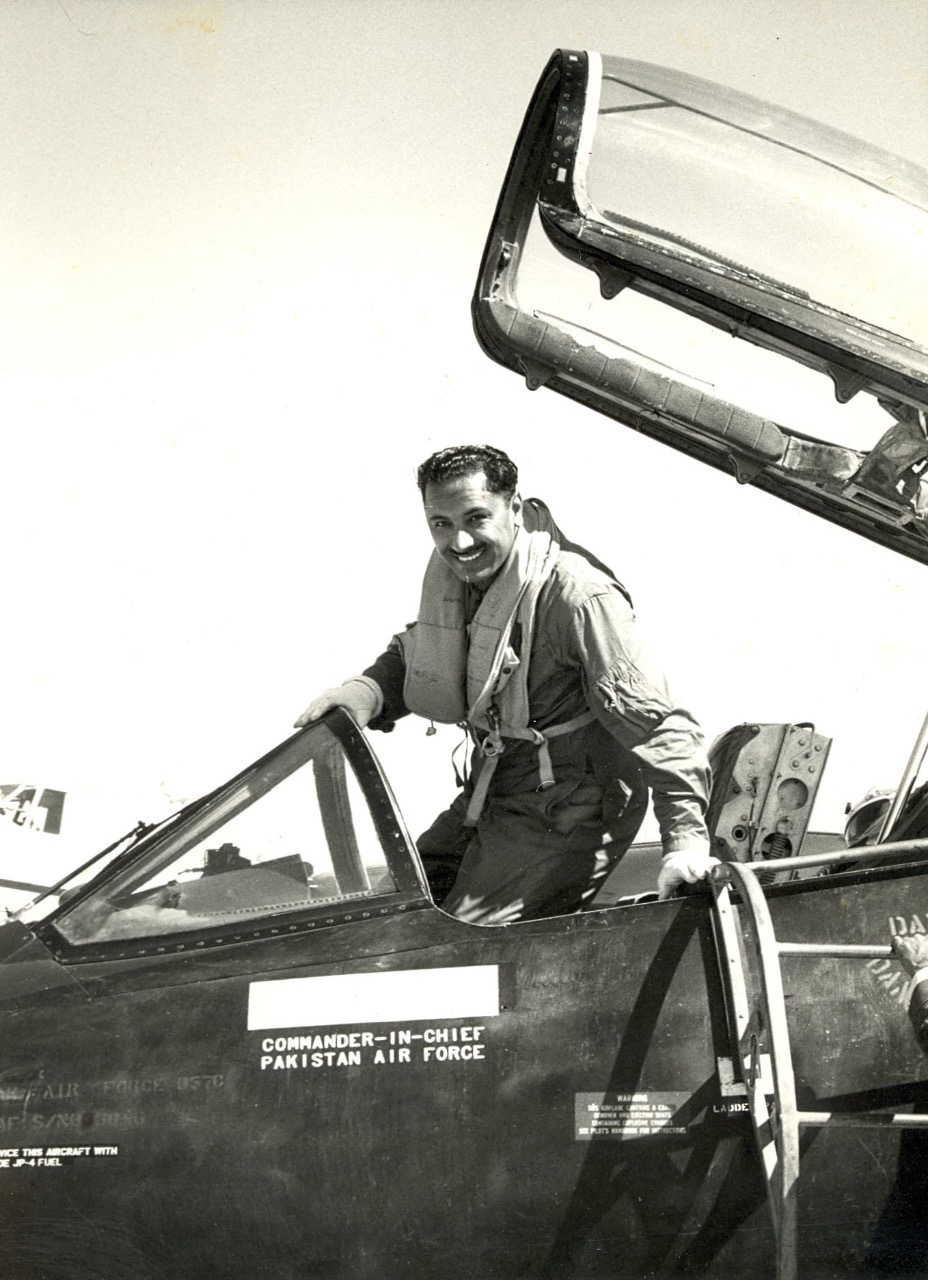
- Air Marshal Asghar Khan in his B-57 Canberra, Pakistan Day, 1962

Chairman Tehrik-e-Istiqlal
- In office 1 March 1970 – 12 December 2011
- Preceded by: Office established
- Succeeded by: Merged with PTI

2nd Commander-in-Chief Pakistan Air Force
- In office 23 July 1957 – 22 July 1965
- President: Iskander Mirza (1956-1958); Ayub Khan (1958-1969)
- Deputy: Maqbool Rabb (1957-1959); M. A. Rahman (1959-1964); Mohammad Akhtar (1964-1966)
- Preceded by: Arthur McDonald
- Succeeded by: Nur Khan

President Pakistan International Airlines
- In office 23 July 1965 – 23 July 1968
- Preceded by: Nur Khan
- Succeeded by: Mohammad Akhtar
Other positions
Member of the 6th National Assembly
In office 21 March 1977 – 4 July 1977
Constituency	NA-13 Abbottabad-II; NA-190 Karachi-VIII
Chief Administrator Civil Aviation Authority and Tourism
In office 23 July 1965 – 23 July 1968 (Note: Went on leave on 7 May 1968, officially retired on 23 July 1968.)
Succeeded by	Mohammad Akhtar
9th President Pakistan Football Federation
In office January 1961 – August 1965
Commander-in-Chief of the Royal Pakistan Air Force
In office (acting); 10 September 1951 – 30 September 1951
Air Officer Commanding No. 1 Group Royal Pakistan Air Force
In office February 1949 – September 1949
Succeeded by	G. B. Kelly
1st Commandant RPAF Flying Training School
In office 15 September 1947 – 15 September 1948
Preceded by	Office Established
Succeeded by	Nur Khan
Chief Flying Instructor Advanced Flying School Ambala
In office 1 November 1946 – 14 August 1947
Commanding officer No. 9 Squadron RIAF
In office 28 August 1945 – 30 October 1946
Flight Commander No. 9 Squadron RIAF (B Flight)
In office 13 December 1944 – 27 August 1945

Personal details
- Born: Mohammad Asghar Khan; 17 January 1921 Jammu, Jammu and Kashmir (princely state)
- Died: 5 January 2018 (aged 96) CMH Rawalpindi, Pakistan
- Cause of death: Cardiac arrest
- Resting place: Nawan Shehr, Khyber Pakhtunkhwa, Pakistan
- Party: Pakistan Tehreek-e-Insaf (2011–2018)
- Other political affiliations: Justice Party (1969); Pakistan Democratic Party (1969); Tehrik-e-Istiqlal (1970–2011)
- Height: 5 ft 10 in (178 cm)
- Spouse: Amina Shamsie (m. 1946; died 2023)
- Children: 4, including Omar and Ali
- Relatives: Aslam Khan (brother); Abaidullah Khan (cousin)
- Education: Prince of Wales Royal Indian Military College; Indian Military Academy; No. 1 (I) SFTS; No. 1 EFTS, Begumpet; Day Fighter Leaders School; RAF Staff College, Andover; Joint Services Staff College (UK) (BSc); Imperial Defence College (MSc)
- Civilian awards: Gold Medal Human Rights Society of Pakistan (1985); Jinnah Award (2006) (Note: The 2006 award was presented to him in 2009.)
- Nickname(s): Father of the Pakistan Air Force; Night Flier

Military service
- Allegiance: British India; Pakistan
- Branch/service: British Indian Army (1940); Royal Indian Air Force (1940–1947); Pakistan Air Force (1947–1965)
- Years of service: 1940—1968 (Note: He continued serving in his rank of Air Marshal as President of Pakistan International Airlines (PIA).)
- Rank: Air Marshal
- Unit: 9th Deccan Horse (1940); No. 3 Squadron RIAF (1941-1944); No. 9 Squadron RIAF (1944-1946)
- Commands: Pakistan Air Force; RPAF Flying Training School; No. 9 Squadron RIAF
- Battles/wars: See List: World War II; Burma Campaign 1944–1945; Indo-Pakistani conflicts; Indo-Pakistani war of 1947–1948; 1959 Canberra shootdown; Rann of Kutch conflict; Dir-Bajaur Campaign (1960-61)
- Military awards: See list
- Asghar Khan's voice Asghar Khan on the political repression under the regime of Field Marshal Ayub Khan, just before his official resignation, amidst signs of its imminent collapse. Broadcast 13 March 1969; Asghar Khan's radio interview.wav

Mohammad Asghar Khan (Note: Urdu: محمد اصغر خان; Sometimes spelled as Muhammad Asghar Khan or Mohammed Asghar Khan.) (17 January 1921 – 5 January 2018), known as Night Flier, held the distinction of being the first native and second Commander-in-Chief of the Pakistan Air Force from 1957 to 1965. He has been described as the Father of the Pakistan Air Force. He was also the ninth president of the Pakistan Football Federation from 1961 to 1965, president of the Pakistan International Airlines from 1965 to 1968, a politician, and author.

Born in Jammu, Khan graduated with distinction from the Indian Military Academy and was commissioned into the British Indian Army in 1940. With the onset of World War II, the Royal Indian Air Force asked for volunteers and he transferred in December of that year. Stationed in Hyderabad in 1942, he was ordered by the martial law administrator of Sindh to attack a convoy of Hurs traveling with Pir of Pagaro VI. Leading three aircraft, Khan refused to attacks them upon seeing that the convoy consisted of unarmed civilians and returned to base. Threatened with a court-martial, Khan replied, "I cannot follow an unlawful command."

Flight Lieutenant Asghar Khan as commander 'B' Flight—No. 9 Sqn, led operations in the Burma Campaign and became the commander of the squadron in 1945. After the war, he considered resigning to participate in the Indonesian revolution but was advised by Jinnah to serve Pakistan's future air force. In 1946, he became the first Indian subcontinent pilot to fly a fighter jet, the Gloster Meteor III while attending the Day Fighter Leaders School at RAF West Raynham. After the Partition of British India, he opted for the Royal Pakistan Air Force and planned to move to Lahore with his wife in 1947. Their home in the Ambala cantonment was reassigned to Wing Commander Nair, who barred them from traveling by train. Though Khan refused to seek help, Nair informed Perry-Keene, the Air Officer Commanding of the RPAF, who arranged a flight to Peshawar, saving their lives, as all passengers on their intended train were killed.

Promoted to Wing Commander, Khan was given the task of establishing the RPAF Flying Training School in Risalpur. In April 1948, Governor General of Pakistan, Muhammad Ali Jinnah, visited the school and upgraded it to the status of a college.

At the age of 36 in 1957, Khan became the youngest Commander-in-Chief of the Pakistan Air Force and the youngest Air Vice Marshal in the world. At 37, he became the youngest Air Marshal. He modernised the Air Force by founding the Fighter Leader's School, Mauripur (Note: Established in 1958, disbanded and reformed into the Combat Commanders' School.) and PAF Staff College, inducting advanced aircraft such as the F-86 Sabre, B-57 Canberra, and the F-104 Starfighter. He also established several air stations, wings, squadrons, and implemented operational reforms. Rejecting a widespread West Pakistani notion that Bengalis were unfit for military service, he abolished height measurements from recruitment criteria. Shortly before the Indo-Pakistani War of 1965, he switched offices with his successor, Air Marshal Nur Khan, and became the head of Pakistan International Airlines. Their tenures are considered the airline's golden age.

Criticising the regime of President Ayub Khan, Asghar Khan entered politics alongside Syed Mahbub Murshed in 1968 after the arrest of Zulfikar Ali Bhutto and spearheaded protests for his release. In 1970, he founded the Tehreek-e-Istiqlal. Following the commencement of Operation Searchlight in 1971, he led protests across East and West Pakistan, demanding the release of Sheikh Mujibur Rahman, leveraging the popularity he had earned as Air Chief and repeatedly advocated for the rights of Bengalis. He opposed the Bengali genocide and demanded that President Yahya Khan be put on trial for his role. By the mid-1970s, Asghar Khan was the main figure behind the Pakistan National Alliance (PNA) against Prime Minister Zulfikar Ali Bhutto.

Elected to the National Assembly from Abbottabad and Karachi in the 1977 elections, Khan was arrested by Prime Minister Bhutto under martial law during a crackdown on nationwide protests against widely alleged electoral rigging. While imprisoned, he read in a newspaper that a Pakistan Army major had killed a civilian who had made a V sign toward the officer. In response, Khan wrote a letter (Note: See, MESSAGE: To The Officers Of The Defence Services of Pakistan (21 May 1977)) urging military officers to distinguish between lawful and unlawful orders. While providing an excerpt from his letter, The Washington Post said Khan was "probably the most popular of the nine Alliance party leaders".

After negotiations between the opposition and Bhutto's government failed, General Zia-ul-Haq launched a coup d'état in July 1977 and placed Khan under house arrest, where he remained until 1984. During this time, Amnesty International recognised him as a prisoner of conscience. Although Khan had earlier led the PNA movement against Bhutto who was executed in 1979, he publicly demanded Bhutto's release in a letter to Zia. In the letter, he also criticised the military regime for failing to hold promised elections within 90 days of the coup.

Despite his stand against authoritarianism, Khan's political influence remained limited in the early 1990s. He filed a human rights petition in 1996 challenging the results of the 1990 elections, which came to be known as the Asghar Khan case. The election was marred by widespread rigging, with Nawaz Sharif securing victory through an election cell created by President Ghulam Ishaq Khan. Funds from the country's foreign exchange reserves were illegally redirected to Sharif by the Pakistan Army and the Inter-Services Intelligence, who manipulated the election by bribing politicians. In 2012, Generals Aslam Beg, Asad Durrani, Hamid Gul, and banker Yunus Habib publicly admitted their involvement in influencing the election results. The Supreme Court of Pakistan ruled in Khan's favour, and ordered the government to take action against those involved. Despite this, no one has faced any repercussions and the case remains largely forgotten. In 2011, Khan merged his party with Pakistan Tehreek-e-Insaf. At the age of 96, he died from cardiac arrest in early 2018.

== Early life ==
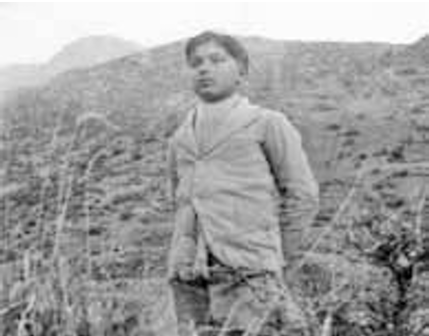
Asghar Khan as a child

Born on 17 January 1921 in Jammu to an Afridi family, Mohammad Asghar Khan was the son of Brigadier Rehmatullah Khan and had 12 siblings. In 1855, Asghar's grandfather Sardar Samad Khan moved from Tirah Valley and settled in Battal-Ballian, near Udhampur in Jammu and Kashmir, where he lived until his death in 1903. Asghar's uncle, Sardar Samundar Khan, was a general in the army of Maharaja Hari Singh.

In 1933, Khan enrolled at the Prince of Wales Royal Indian Military College in Dehradun. After six years at the college, he qualified to take the entrance examination for the Indian Military Academy (IMA) and was selected for training in 1939.

While living in Srinagar, Khan underwent the required medical examination at the Combined Military Hospital in Sialkot before joining the IMA. He was initially informed that albumin detected in his urine indicated a life-threatening condition and that he had only a few months to live. Further examination determined that it was harmless functional albumin, and he was declared medically fit to join the academy.

He aspired to become a fighter pilot in the Royal Indian Air Force and sought a transfer shortly before the outbreak of World War II in 1939. However, he was unable to train at RAF College Cranwell after admissions for Indian cadets were suspended.

== Personal life ==
Asghar Khan married Amina Shamsie in November 1946, while serving as the Chief Flying Instructor at RIAF Station Ambala. She was the sister of Syed Saleem Shamsie, the husband of Muneeza Shamsie.

Asghar and Amina had two daughters, Nasreen and Shereen, and two sons, Ali and Cambridge-educated Professor Omar Asghar Khan, who died under mysterious circumstances two months before the 2002 Pakistani general election, during the regime of General Musharraf.

After Omar's mysterious death, Ardeshir Cowasjee wrote in Dawn that the "indefatigable old warrior of our skies" is "sorely wounded" by the loss of his son. He described Asghar Khan as "an honest man of moderate means" who "genuinely wished to do good" but believed there was "no way, no way at all" he could succeed in Pakistan's political environment, given "the mindset of the majority."

During his tenure as chief of the Air Force, a PAF officer approached his father, Rehmatullah Khan, seeking a recommendation for a preferred posting. Rehmatullah contacted President Ayub Khan to request that Asghar Khan assist the officer. Ayub Khan complied, but Asghar Khan declined the request. Following this incident, Asghar severed communication with his father for an extended period. Columnist Shahzad Chaudhry from The Express Tribune, reflected on his principled refusal and wrote, "They don't make them like that anymore".

Asghar Khan was fluent in Pashto, Urdu, and English, though he spoke Punjabi only occasionally.

== Military career ==
=== British Indian Army ===
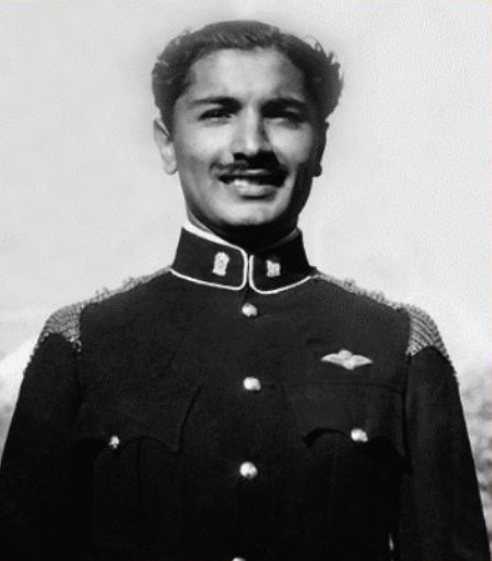
Second Lieutenant Asghar Khan in his Cavalry Blue Patrol Dress, 1940

After 1½ years of training at the Indian Military Academy, (Note: World War II forced the early conclusion of the two-year training course.) Khan graduated with distinction and was commissioned as a Second Lieutenant into the 9th Deccan Horse of the British Indian Army on 3 January 1940.

=== Royal Indian Air Force and World War II service ===
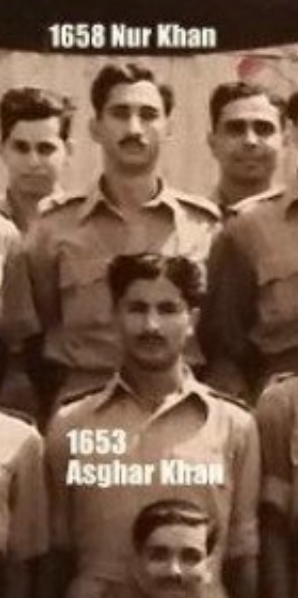
Asghar Khan and Nur Khan among 77 Pilot Officer Cadets at No. 1 (I) SFTS, 1941

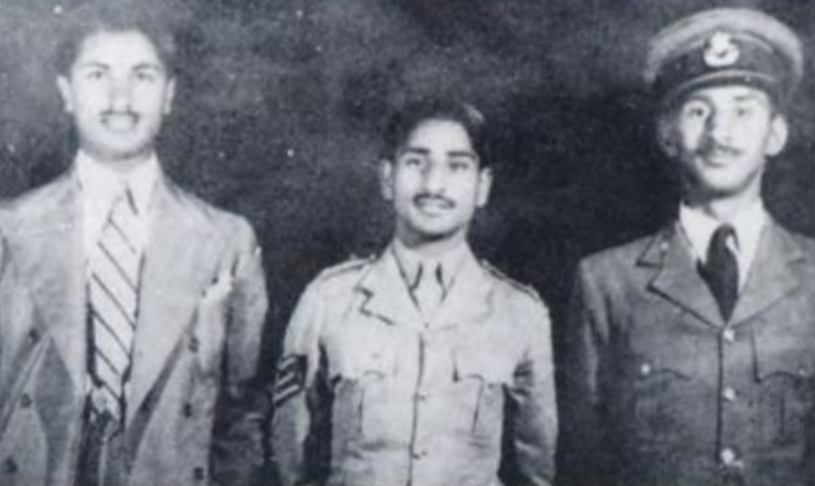
Asghar Khan, Cadet Captain Dharanidhar Jayal, and Nur Khan, at a PWRIMC reunion (1941)

After the outbreak of World War II, the Royal Indian Air Force began inducting personnel again and in pursuit of his dream, Khan was seconded to the air force on 22 December 1940. He began his training at the Initial Training Wing at Walton in Lahore, then trained at the No. 1 EFTS, Begumpet for a three month course on the Tiger Moth, mastering the aircraft and then the Hawker Audax in Ambala.

In December 1941, Khan transferred to No. 3 Sqn stationed in Peshawar and became a pilot on Wapiti and Hawker Hart aircraft. The squadron later moved to Kohat.

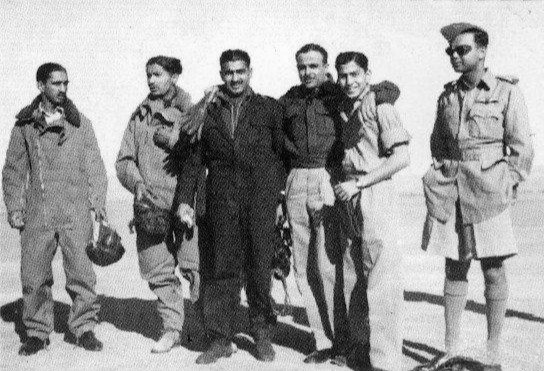
From left: Nur Khan, Asghar Khan, Abdur Rahim Khan, Om Prakash Mehra, Minoo Merwan Engineer, and an unidentified officer (1944)

Stationed in Hyderabad, Sindh in 1942, Asghar Khan's commanding officer was Flight Lieutenant Om Prakash Mehra. Khan was ordered by Major General Richardson, the Martial Law Administrator of Sindh, to destroy a convoy of Hurs which was proceeding East with Pir of Pagaro VI. Mehra ordered Khan to lead the flight, with Richardson telling them that this was an important mission and he would wait at the airbase for the return of Khan and his pilots. After taking off with four aircraft, Khan came across the convoy but upon seeing them, noticed that they were unarmed men, women, and children. He refused to carry out the order and returned to base without firing a single shot, telling an annoyed Richardson, who threatened him with a court-martial, "I cannot follow an unlawful command".

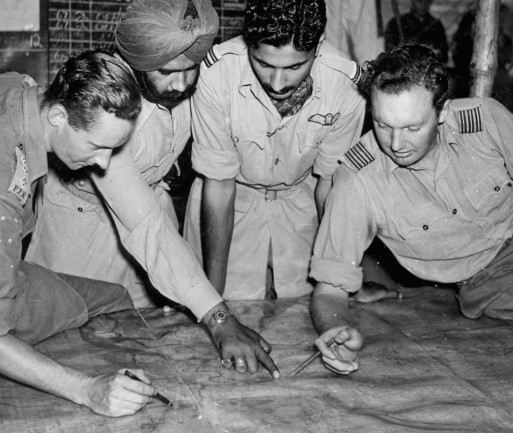
Squadron Leader Shivdev Singh, second from left, flanked by a British Indian Army officer, while Flight Lieutenant Asghar Khan, third from the left, is flanked by a Wing Commander during a mission planning session, World War II, 1945

From 13 December 1944 to 27 August 1945, Flight Lieutenant Asghar Khan was Flight Commander 'B' Flight, No. 9 Sqn, stationed in Burma during World War II and fought in the Burma Campaign leading aerial operations against Japanese forces. He engaged in ground strikes in the Arakan flying aircraft such as the Hurricane IIC, Spitfire Mk VIII, and Spitfire Mk XIV. Afterwards, he participated in peacetime training at Delhi and Ranchi. In 2015, retired Group Captain Micky Blake recalled his time with Khan when he was Flight Commander. Blake remembered Khan challenging an American squadron of lightning fighters who mocked their Hurricanes as "peashooters". In a dogfight over the base, Khan, despite being outnumbered two to one, "skillfully got on their tails", leaving the USAF pilots "much more subdued than when they took off!"

When his former squadron mate Dalip Singh Majithia fell ill in late February 1945, Flt Lt Asghar Khan, flew him to a hospital in Calcutta in a Harvard aircraft.

Promoted to Squadron Leader, he was appointed Commanding Officer of No. 9 Sqn on 28 August 1945. The squadron remained at Ranchi until 16 October 1945, when it left for Calcutta. Returning to British India from Burma in August 1945, he recalled that President Sukarno called on pilots from around the Muslim world to assist Indonesia in its fight against Dutch colonisers. In his words, Khan was disillusioned with bureaucracy and inspired by Sukarno's anti-imperialist campaigns against the Dutch, and contemplated resigning to assist Indonesia in their quest for independence. Before making a decision, he walked four miles to Safdarjung Airport to meet Muhammad Ali Jinnah, the founder of the All-India Muslim League, in November 1945. This was their first meeting and Jinnah advised him to work for the anticipated new country, Pakistan's air force, instead.

At the airstrip of Gurgaon on 12 March 1946, Air Marshal Roderick Carr presented a Japanese Samurai sword to Commanding Officer Asghar Khan. Shortly after, he attended the Day Fighter Leaders School at RAF West Raynham and earned an 'A' grade as Squadron Commander. While there, he became the Indian subcontinent's first pilot to fly a fighter jet, the Gloster Meteor III, on 20 May 1946.

On 7 June 1947, Squadron Leader Asghar Khan was appointed to the sub-committee led by Air Vice Marshal Allan Perry-Keene to distribute the defence assets of British India between the proposed states of Pakistan and India. Khan's attachment with No. 9 Sqn, which he had commanded, was noted as being so deep that he insisted the squadron be awarded to the impending Royal Pakistan Air Force.

==== Partition ====
After the Partition of British India, he opted for Pakistan and was set to depart with his family from Ambala by train to Lahore on 23 August 1947. The house where he was staying, was assigned to Wing Commander Nair of the RIAF. Nair and his wife stayed as guests until Khan and his wife left. During this time, the region was engulfed in widespread communal violence, but Khan had limited information due to news censorship.

A few days before Khan's departure, Wg Cdr Nair, who was informed about the dire situation in the two new countries, advised him not to travel by train due to the ongoing massacres. Instead, Nair suggested that Khan ask Allan Perry-Keene, Air Officer Commanding, Royal Pakistan Air Force, to arrange an aircraft for their journey. Khan was hesitant, telling Nair that it would be odd for him, as a squadron leader to make such a request, but Nair insisted he would contact Keene himself if Khan did not.

Nair called Keene and he agreed. Two days later, a DC-3 Dakota which was carrying Keene's luggage from Delhi destined for Peshawar, arrived for Khan and his family in Ambala. As they flew towards Peshawar, Khan recalled that he witnessed houses ablaze in almost every village from Ambala to the Pakistani border near Lahore. In his book, My Political Struggle, Khan wrote that these were evidently the homes of Muslims, with this creating an unforgettable and distressing sight for him. Khan later discovered that all the passengers on the train he initially planned to take had been massacred, and none had survived the journey to Pakistan. He recalled, "Wing Commander Nair did us a good turn and saved our lives".

=== Pakistan Air Force ===
==== Nascent years ====
After arriving in Pakistan, Khan joined the Royal Pakistan Air Force where he was promoted to Wing Commander and tasked with establishing the RPAF Flying Training School. Appointed as its first commandant, he "managed to build it to the extent that in a short time it produced as many pilots as could have been trained in pre-Independence Indo-Pakistan."

On 13 April 1948, during his first visit to a unit of the RPAF, Governor-General Muhammad Ali Jinnah, visited the Flying School at Risalpur—despite his deteriorating health. Accompanied by his sister, Fatima Jinnah, he was welcomed by Asghar Khan and reviewed a ceremonial parade composed of Flight Cadets from the 2nd, 3rd, 4th, and 5th GD(P) courses. Additionally, Jinnah upgraded the school which was renamed as the Royal Pakistan Air Force College. Air Commodore M.K. Janjua and Asghar Khan designed the RPAF flag which Jinnah then presented to the Air Force. The opening lines of the speech Jinnah delivered on this visit remain enshrined in the creed of the Pakistan Air Force:

"There is no doubt that a country without a strong Air Force is at the mercy of any aggressor. Pakistan must build up her air force as quickly as possible. It must be an efficient air force second to none and must take its right place with the Army and the Navy in securing Pakistan's Defence."

— Muhammad Ali Jinnah

On 15 September 1948, Asghar Khan was succeeded by Nur Khan as Commandant of the College, while he was appointed Officer Commanding of a Fighter Bomber Wing based in Peshawar, with operational responsibilities extending to Sargodha and the majority of the operational and transport units of the Air Force.

After a 10-day gap in supply drops, a mission was undertaken on the night of 17/18 November 1948, during the Indo-Pakistani war. Wing Commander Asghar Khan and Squadron Leader M.J. Khan successfully flew the first hazardous night sortie, leading to further operations that helped prevent enemy advances. Asghar Khan also oversaw the transport of vital equipment, such as a mortar barrel flown from Risalpur to Gilgit. His brother, Major Aslam Khan, played a key role on the ground, and had trained the rebels who defeated the Jammu and Kashmir State Forces in the Battle of Muzaffarabad, earning recognition as a "liberator" of Kashmir and as the Legend of Baltistan.

During the war, which dragged on inconclusively until December 1948, some Pakistani forces continued fighting after the ceasefire due to broken landline and radio communications. It was decided that orders for the ceasefire would be airdropped by two DC-3 Dakotas from No. 6 Squadron PAF. Asghar Khan organised, briefed and joined the mission himself. The briefing was scheduled for 0600 hours and the departure at 0700 on a cold December morning. While Khan arrived at 0550 and most of the aircrew were on time, a few were reported late between 0601-0610. Reportedly, Asghar Khan was angered by the delay and ordered the entire squadron to report daily at 0400 hours at the air traffic control building until further notice. He also ordered Officer Commanding Squadron Leader M.J. Khan, to be present and record individual arrival times.

By 1949, Asghar was appointed Commander of No. 1 Group. At the time, the RPAF was organised into two groups: No. 1 Group Headquarters for Operations, based in Peshawar, and No. 2 Group Headquarters for Maintenance, located at Drigh Road.

Group Captain Asghar Khan attended RAF Staff College, Andover in 1950. In the absence of Air Vice Marshal Leslie William Cannon, who had gone to England to secure more equipment for the RPAF, Khan briefly served as acting Commander-in-Chief from 10 September to 30 September 1951. That year, Khan was then appointed Director of Administration of the Air Force. Thereafter, he served as Assistant Chief of Air Staff (Operations). By 1952, he was selected for a course at the Joint Services Staff College (UK).

In response to the Communist threat, Gp Capt Asghar Khan, Gp Capt Nur Khan, and Wg Cdr A. Qadir developed an expansion plan for the PAF in March 1954. This plan outlined a ten-year goal from 1954 to 1964, aiming to establish the Air Force with 768 aircraft across 44 squadrons. It included ten day-fighter squadrons, five night-fighter squadrons, six bomber squadrons, one reconnaissance squadron, twelve fighter-bomber squadrons, six tactical light bomber squadrons, two twin-engine and one four-engine transport squadrons, and two maritime squadrons.

On 17 April 1954, Group Captains' Haider Raza and Asghar Khan were both promoted to the rank of Air Commodore. Khan met with Brigadier William T. Sexton, Chief of the Military Advisory Assistance Group to Pakistan, on 3 August 1954 to discuss equipment procurement for the Pakistan Air Force.

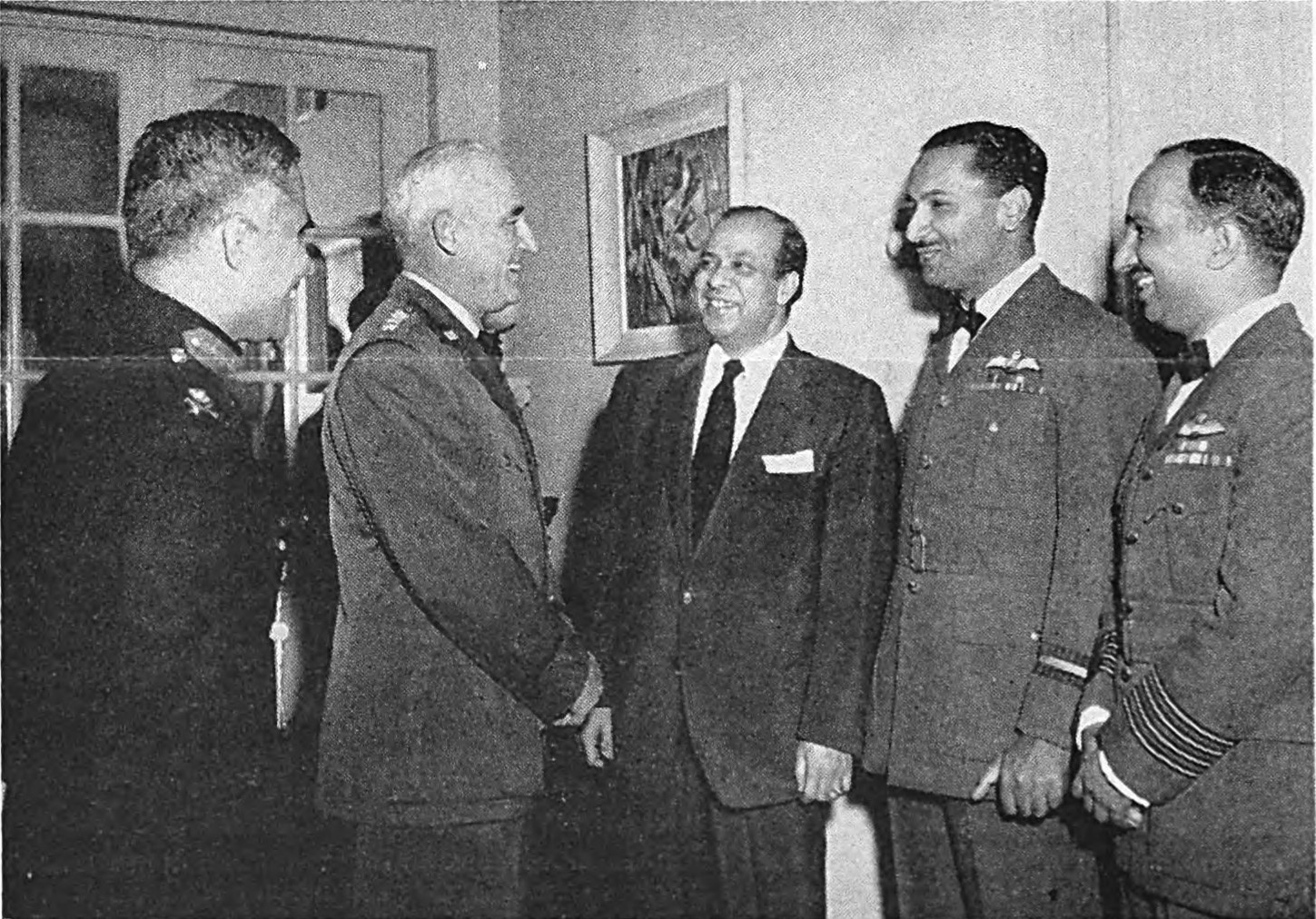
From left: Maj Gen Mian Hayaud Din, General Twining, Ambassador Bogra, Air Cdre Asghar Khan, and Gp Capt Akhtar. Pictured at a reception held in Khan's honor in Washington, D.C., after the announcement of his appointment as Chief of the Pakistan Air Force. Circa 21 April – May 1957

Along with Agha Hilaly and Sheikh Anwarul Haq, Air Commodore Asghar Khan was chosen to attend the 1955 course at the Imperial Defence College, which commenced in January of that year. On 19 April 1955, he was among a group of senior officers from the fighting and civil services attending the college, who visited the Barnsley factory of Brook Motors Ltd. This visit was part of a tour of industrial sites in Yorkshire, aimed at providing the officers with insights into various challenges that would be relevant both at the College and in their future assignments. While at the college, he attempted to learn Egyptian Arabic and tried speaking it with an Egyptian attaché in Pakistan, but was greeted with "helpless laughter", its noted that the language he had studied was not true Arabic but the version used by the British when shopping in the Muskey Bazaar in Cairo.

In June 1955, Minister of Defence General Ayub Khan, asked his pilot Wing Commander S.M. Lanky Ahmad about the most suitable Pakistani officer to become the next Commander-in-Chief of the Pakistan Air Force. He responded that as the defence minister, Ayub was in the best position to judge. However, Ayub insisted on hearing his personal opinion. Lanky referred to the RPAF seniority list and mentioned three likely candidates: Air Commodores Haider Raza, Maqbool Rabb, and Asghar Khan. He strongly recommended Asghar, who was still actively flying and "very popular". He also noted that Prime Minister Bogra had already recommended Raza for the position, and the file was awaiting the approval of Governor-General Malik Ghulam Muhammad at the Defence Ministry.

Air Commodore Asghar Khan was nominated as Commander-in-Chief by Prime Minister H. S. Suhrawardy on 20 April 1957, set to assume command upon the retirement of Arthur McDonald.

==== Commander-in-Chief (1957—1965) ====
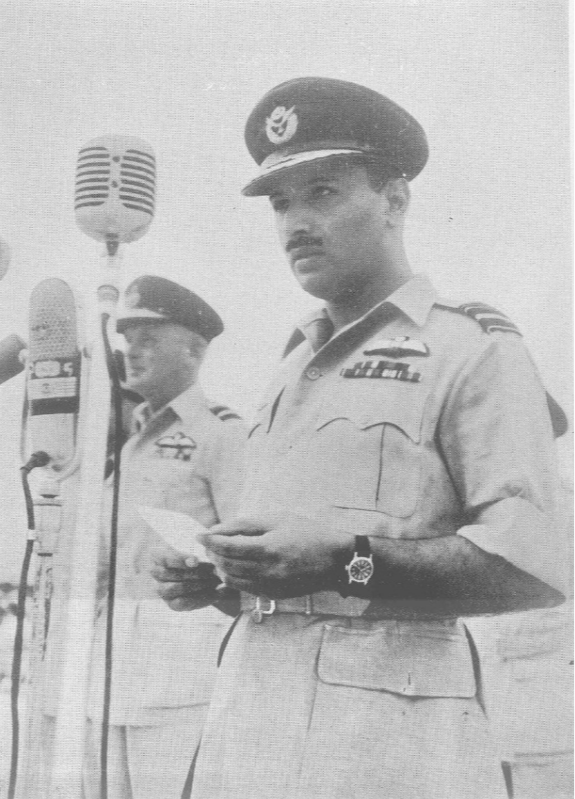
Air Vice Marshal Asghar Khan replies to the farewell address of Arthur McDonald, 23 July 1957

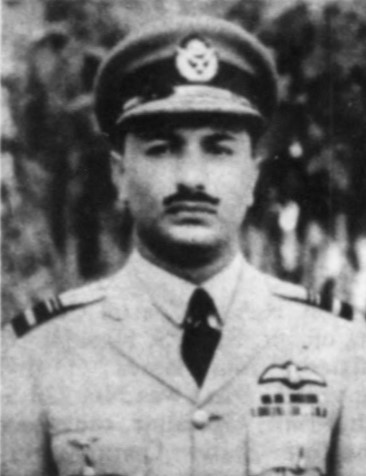
Portrait of Air-Vice Marshal Asghar Khan, 1958 (Note: This image was taken between 23 July 1957 and February 1958, the latter being the publication date. Asghar Khan was promoted to Air Marshal on 5 November 1958.)

On 23 July 1957, Asghar Khan was promoted and became the youngest Air Vice Marshal (AVM) in the world at 36, and the first native chief of the Pakistan Air Force, succeeding McDonald. With his appointment, all three branches of the Pakistan Armed Forces—the Army, Navy, and Air Force—were now under Pakistani command for the first time.

The handing-over ceremony took place at PAF Station Mauripur with a lineup of over 100 aircraft, primarily F-86 Sabre and T-33 jets, on the tarmac. A guard of honour from Mauripur station was present for the ceremony. After inspecting the contingent and reviewing the aircraft, outgoing Air Vice Marshal McDonald praised the growing efficiency of the Air Force and reflected on its progress over the last ten years.

In his response, Asghar Khan thanked McDonald for his generous tribute to the PAF's growing efficiency and acknowledged the contributions of the Royal Air Force to the development of the PAF. He further expressed confidence that, as members of The Commonwealth, SEATO, and the Baghdad Pact, their relationship would grow in strength and importance. He also shared his optimism about the demonstrated enthusiasm and efficiency of PAF personnel and emphasised the strong support they had received from both the government and the nation in building this crucial arm of Pakistan's defence forces.

As chief, Asghar Khan significantly dismissed the notion held by the leadership of West Pakistan, that Bengalis were physically unfit for army recruitment. He abolished this standard in the PAF, arguing that height and chest measurements were irrelevant to combat effectiveness.

In January 1958, Asghar Khan tasked Wing Commanders' FS Hussain and Mitty Masud with training pilots for King Zahir Shah of Afghanistan's visit to Pakistan. The Falcons aerobatic team, led by Masud, set a world record on 2 February with a 16-aircraft diamond loop in F-86 Sabres. The event, attended by 30,000 spectators—including President Iskandar Ali Mirza, General Ayub Khan, Asghar Khan, Air Commodore Nur Khan, Turkish Air Force General Suphi Göker, Iraqi Air Chief Abdul Kadhim Abaddi, and Iranian Air Force General Hedayatollah Gilanshah and the king—was a success. Though FS Hussain did not fly, Asghar Khan later commended him in a letter, praising his expertise and guidance in ensuring smooth operations.

King Zahir Shah arrives at PAF Station Mauripur with President Iskandar Mirza and Nahid Mirza, welcomed by AVM Asghar Khan and Air Cdre Nur Khan. Also present are General Ayub Khan and the Iraqi, Turkish, and Iranian Air Chiefs. The World record loop is featured at the end of the footage, 2 February 1958.

During a meeting with Assistant Secretary of Defense Mansfield D. Sprague, in Washington, D.C. on 29 April 1958, General Ayub Khan and AVM Asghar Khan discussed U.S. military aid to Pakistan. Ayub requested the expedited delivery of a light bomber squadron under the 1954 Mutual Defense Assistance Agreement. When Asghar learned the aircraft would be the B-57 Canberra, he expressed his concerns as a technician, stating it was outdated and unworthy of Pakistani resources. He argued that the B-66 Destroyer or English Electric Canberra would be better options. Ayub appeared shocked by the back-and-forth discussion, especially as Asghar remained adamant against accepting the B–57 despite assurances of its quality. The meeting concluded with plans for Asghar Khan to visit a U.S. squadron operating B–57s for further evaluation.

On 27 October, the night of the 1958 Pakistani coup d'état, AVM Asghar Khan was asked by General Ayub Khan to accompany Generals Azam Khan, Wajid Ali Khan Burki, K. M. Sheikh, and Brigadier Malik Sher Bahadur in approaching President Iskandar Mirza to demand his resignation. However, Asghar declined the request, stating that he "found the whole exercise distasteful," including Mirza's abrogation of the constitution, through which he imposed martial law just three weeks earlier. On that night, Asghar Khan arrived at the VIP room of Mauripur airfield to bid farewell to Iskandar Mirza and his wife Nahid Mirza, who were being sent into exile by Ayub Khan. He found the couple seated on a sofa, with a junior Pakistan Army officer in an adjacent chair, his legs stretched across the table in front of the former President. Asghar told the officer that this was "the height of insolence" and "totally unnecessary," and ordered him out of the room.

On 30 October, General Musa Khan, Vice Admiral HMS Choudri, and Air Vice Marshal Asghar Khan were appointed Deputy Chief Martial Law Administrators through Order No. 11, issued by the Chief Martial Law Administrator, General Ayub Khan. On 5 November 1958, Asghar Khan was promoted to the three-star rank of Air Marshal (AM).

Following the 1959 Canberra shootdown by the PAF, he presented a six-page list of then-recent violations of Pakistani airspace to a news correspondent in Karachi in May of that year. Several of the violations were from India. Within the preceding month, there had also been a significant number of violations by unidentified aircraft over the Gilgit Agency. Khan left the presumption open that they were Russian bombers on reconnaissance missions. That year, he was also appointed as a Military Adviser to Southeast Asia Treaty Organization (SEATO).

The first B-57 Canberra of the PAF was piloted by Asghar Khan and landed on 23 November 1959 at PAF Station Drigh Road. In February 1960, he became the 1,131st recipient of the Certificate of Supersonic Recognition for mach busting after piloting the North American F-100F Super Sabre. The award was presented to him by Major General Viccellio of the United States Air Force.

At the 12th SEATO military advisers conference on 25 May 1960, Khan called on members of the pact to keep their guard up and said: "Conditions in South and Southeast Asia require vigilance from the members of this alliance and we are conscious of the great responsibility that is shared by its members".

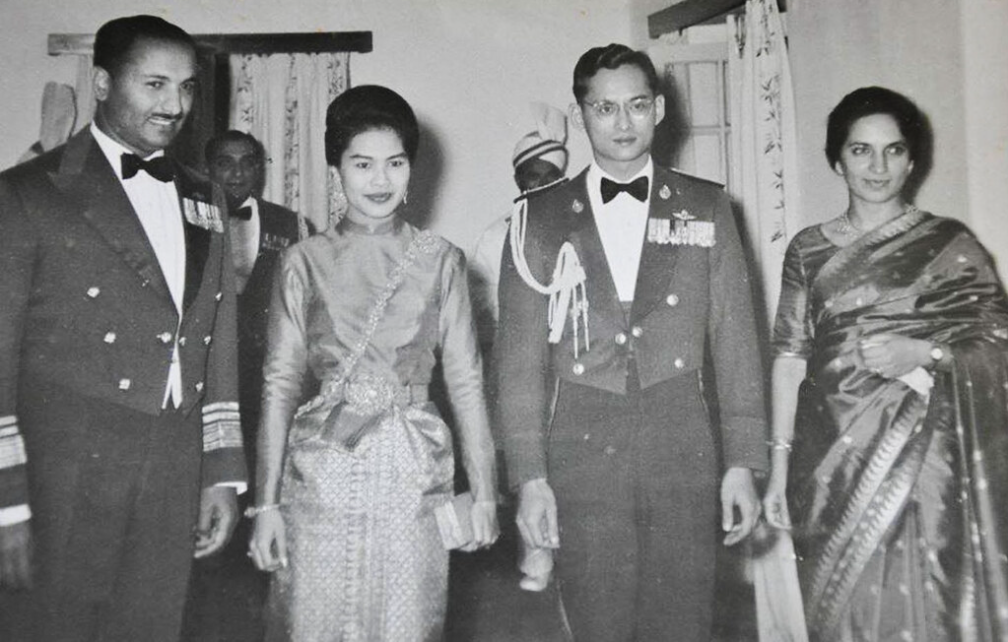
Asghar Khan, Chief Guests Queen Sirikit and King Bhumibol of Thailand, and Khan's wife Amina at a banquet in PAF Officer's Mess Peshawar (1962)

The Government of Pakistan extended his tenure as Commander-in-Chief by four years on 7 April 1961. In 1964, Asghar Khan became the first air chief to lead the fly past on the Pakistan Day parade in an B-57 Canberra.

In the lead-up to the Indo-Pakistani War of 1965, tensions between India and Pakistan escalated. On 8 April 1965, both nations launched attacks on each other's posts. On 14 April, he called Air Chief Marshal Arjan Singh of India—his former colleague from the RIAF—and they agreed to keep their forces out of the conflict. During this phone call, Air Marshal Asghar Khan warned that if the Indian Air Force (IAF) targeted Pakistani ground forces, the PAF would respond as necessary, potentially escalating the conflict. Despite pressure from Indian military leaders to deploy the IAF, Singh concurred with Khan's stance and refrained from sending the IAF into action as he was aware of the PAF's strategic advantages with airfields in Karachi and Badin. This agreement helped prevent the use of air power during the early stages of the conflict, despite the rising tensions between the two countries.

Air Marshal Asghar Khan appears throughout (Note: Khan is seen at various timestamps 0:17-0:18, 1:13-1:17, and 1:26-1:28) a video of the SEATO military chiefs' conference at Lancaster House, where military leaders discussed Far Eastern defence and the Vietnam War, 1965.

Asghar Khan is credited with establishing the following:

- Fighter Leader's School at PAF Station Mauripur in June 1958
- Introducing monthly air staff presentations in July 1958
- Establishing PAF Staff College in January 1959, inducting F-86 Sabre's into the PAF along with Nur Khan
- Forming an inspectorate team at AHQ (PAF) in January 1959
- Establishing PAF's first maintenance unit at Drigh Road in January 1959
- Installing the first high-powered radar at Badin and inducting the B-57 Canberra into the fleet of the PAF in November 1959
- Establishing the Ski & Snow Survival School at Kalabagh Nathiagali in 1960
- Forming Sector Operations Center (North) Sakesar in July 1960
- Inducting F-104 Starfighter's in March 1961
- Establishing PAF Station Sargodha and PAF Station Samungli (Note: All PAF stations were renamed to bases on 1 July 1970.)
- Forming No 31/33/34/35 wings
- Introducing ground-controlled approach (GCA) in the PAF in 1961
- Forming Airfield Construction Squadrons in January 1962
- Establishing the School of Physical Fitness and PAF's first printing press
- Inducting T-33 and T-37 trainer aircraft in February 1962
- Introducing the concept of the Inter-Squadron Armament Competition and Annual Flight Safety Trophy
- Establishing the No 3 (Transport Conversion School), No. 7 Sqn PAF, No. 8 Sqn PAF, No. 18 Sqn PAF, No. 19 Sqn PAF, No. 23 Sqn PAF, No. 24 Sqn PAF
- Inducting the C-130 Hercules aircraft into the fleet of PAF in March 1963
- Establishing No 32 Wing in July 1964
- Establishing the College of Aeronautical Engineering in March 1965
- Establishing the PAF Model School (now Fazaia) in April 1965.

== Sports administration (1961–1968) ==
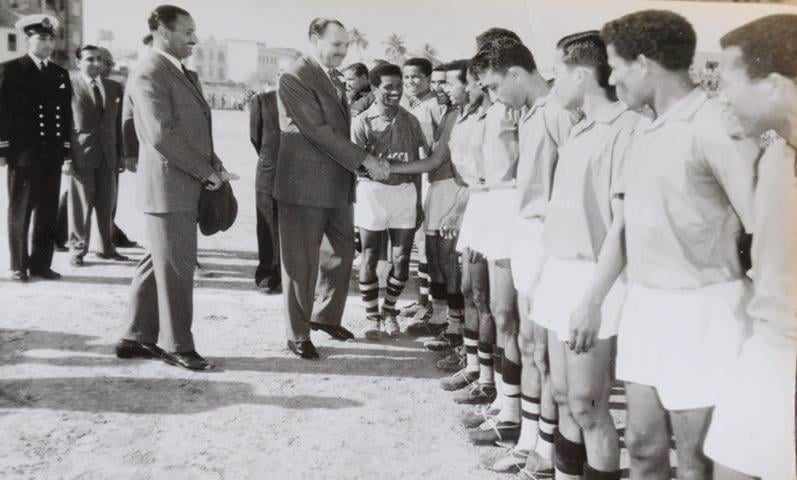
Asghar Khan and President Ayub Khan with the Dacca Division team at the 1961–62 National Football Championship final against Karachi Blues.

On 10 January 1961, Asghar Khan was appointed as the ninth President of the Pakistan Football Federation by the control board, which selected him to lead efforts in reorganising and revitalising the federation's activities. He resigned as President in August 1965 after serving in what was described as a "praiseworthy manner".

The Peshawar Golf Club celebrated its Centenary in 1963 under the leadership of its president, Air Marshal Asghar Khan and to mark the occasion, he invited professional golfer John Jacobs from Middlesex's Sandy Lodge Club.

From 1965 to 1968, Khan also served as President of the Karachi Golf Club.

== President Pakistan International Airlines (1965–1968) ==
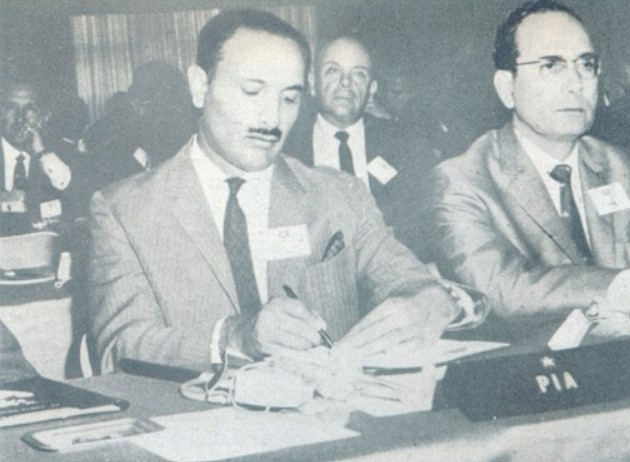
PIA President Air Marshal Asghar Khan (left) and Vice President Mohammad Salim (right) at the 22nd IATA Annual General Meeting in Mexico City, Mexico, in 1966.

Asghar Khan was initially uninterested in taking on any government position, expressing his desire for retirement and reluctance to engage in employment. However, President Ayub Khan insisted that he remain in service but as the head of Pakistan International Airlines (PIA), as well as the Chief Administrator of Civil Aviation and Tourism—all of which operated under the Ministry of Defence. Despite his efforts to dissuade Ayub Khan, he remained firm in his insistence. After extensive discussions and debates, Asghar Khan eventually agreed to the president's suggestion. He agreed to temporarily take on the role until a suitable replacement for the PIA could be found and continued serving in his rank of Air Marshal.

Prior to Asghar Khan's appointment as president, his brother Afzal Khan, who was a former Commander in the Pakistan Navy and the owner of a dairy company, had a lucrative contract to supply the PIA, which accounted for 50% of his profit. Asghar Khan canceled this contract upon taking over, citing that it was not ethically acceptable to him for his brother to make money while he was the head of the airline.

At the beginning of the India–Pakistan war of 1965, Asghar Khan was sent to China on 10 September as President Ayub Khan's special envoy, carrying letters for Premier Zhou Enlai and Soekarno of Indonesia.

As President of the PIA, Asghar Khan moved into a larger residence in Karachi, which gave him more time to enjoy gardening and his favorite sport—golf. In July 1966, the Aeroplane observed that the "serene environment" of the golf course may have influenced some of the policies that were becoming more visible in PIA. To promote similar recreational activities, he planned the development of additional golf courses in Pakistan, and he had already increased the domestic baggage allowance to accommodate golf equipment. In his role as head of the national tourism organisation, he was also tasked with improving recreational facilities across the country. Given his prior experience on PIA's board of directors, these roles were not unfamiliar to him. Khan moved swiftly to reinforce PIA's organisational structure, aligning it with reforms he was introducing in the other institutions under his leadership. His main base of operations was his office at Karachi Airport, where he delegated much of his authority to senior staff members.

In 1966, Asghar Khan told Omar Kureishi, the head of PIA's Public Relations team, that he wanted to change the air hostess uniforms. Kureishi recommended renowned French designer Pierre Cardin. After the two met, Pierre created a fawn-colored summer uniform, a moss-green winter uniform, and an iconic dupatta, which captivated the aviation world in 1966, boosting PIA's global reputation. During this period, PIA achieved its lowest accident rate and recorded a historic net profit of PKR 55.5 million. Asghar Khan, interested in commercial aviation, appeared before the Federal Aviation Administration (FAA) for the commercial pilot's exam and earned his license, occasionally captaining Boeing flights. In 1967, PIA acquired Pakistan's first computer, the IBM 1401. PIA also commissioned an engine overhaul shop near its Head Office and completed a jet hangar with an airframe overhaul shop in 1968. Additionally, the airline inducted three new Boeing 707 jets, with a fourth expected in July 1968.

During a news conference in Karachi on 11 May 1967, Air Marshal Asghar Khan announced that PIA had become the fifth largest profit-making airline in the world, carrying one million passengers annually. At a press conference held at the PIA headquarters in Karachi in July 1967, he announced plans for the construction of a series of small hotels in major cities and resort areas across the country, with a total investment of Rs44.5 million or US$9,345,000 (equivalent to $90,232,410 in 2025). The project included building 64-room hotels in Sylhet, Sargodha, Sukkur, Mohenjo-daro, Chitral, Gilgit, and Kaptai, and 88-room hotels in Khulna, Lyallpur, Multan, and Murree, with an additional 20 cottages attached to the new 644 room Kaptai Hotel. Furthermore, Peshawar and Chittagong would each have hotels with 125 rooms.

The PIA Pavilion for the Pakistan Golf Federation was opened by Khan on 26 March 1968, and is now the Clubhouse of Islamabad Gymkhana Club.

Air Vice Marshal Mohammad Akhtar officially took control of the PIA on 23 July 1968, after Khan went on leave on 7 May. The airline, which had achieved eight consecutive years of profitability under both Asghar and his predecessor, Air Vice Marshal Nur Khan, expanded its routes during Asghar Khan's tenure, to new destinations including Paris, Istanbul, Nairobi, and Bangkok. Their tenures are considered the airline's golden age.

== Political career ==
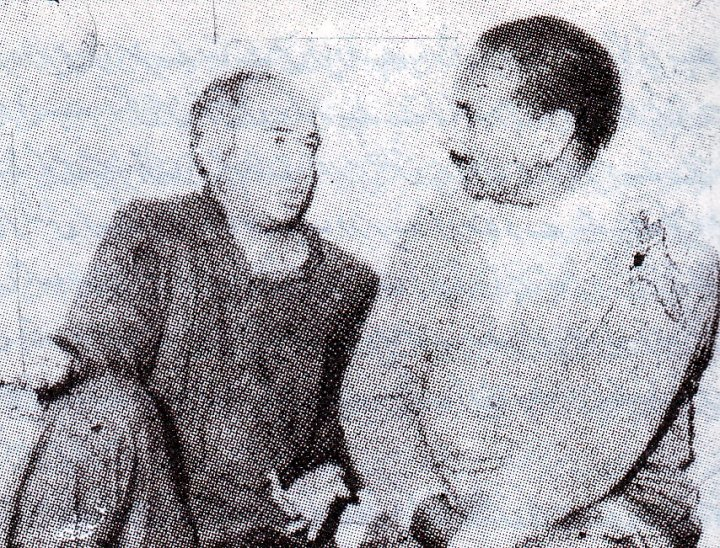
Asghar Khan visits Zulfikar Ali Bhutto, who was on house arrest in Larkana, circa 1968-69

=== Initial years and Justice Party ===
After retiring from the airline, Asghar Khan lived quietly at his home in Abbottabad. Before being imprisoned by President Field Marshal Ayub Khan, Zulfikar Ali Bhutto approached Asghar Khan, asking him to join his party, the Pakistan Peoples Party (PPP). Khan declined and said he had no interest in politics. Bhutto then confided, "Ayub will have me killed through the Nawab of Kalabagh". In response, Asghar Khan assured him, "If Ayub arrests you, I will publicly protest on your behalf". After Bhutto's arrest on 13 November 1968, Asghar Khan held a press conference in Lahore on 17 November, where he openly criticised Ayub Khan. During his speech, Asghar Khan remarked, "graft, nepotism, corruption, and administrative incompetence are affecting the lives and happiness of millions. Social inequality and economic disparity are increasing. Telephones are tapped, opinion is shackled, the opposition is shadowed and jailed, and no one can express his views fully". When asked by reporters about his role as chief of the air force when General Ayub Khan staged a coup d'état in 1958, Asghar said "I had a job to do, to run the Air Force and I continued to do this until my retirement. It wasn't a question of supporting any one".

The following week, Khan told The Times, "at present the whole structure stinks. It is not a healthy system, there is no criticism. The press is completely suppressed, there is no check on the government. We are bordering on a police state". Asghar Khan led protests calling for Bhutto's release, which ultimately led to his freedom and grew so close to Bhutto that many saw him as a potential successor.

In a letter on 9 December 1968, Asghar Khan formally requested written permission to meet Zulfikar Ali Bhutto in jail to discuss the political situation in the country. He referred to a previous phone conversation with the Home Secretary on 3 December in which he requested a private meeting with Bhutto. However, he was informed that a meeting without a police officer present would not be allowed. Khan stated that the presence of a police officer would defeat the purpose of the meeting. He added that if the government could not permit a private meeting "despite the deteriorating situation in the country," he would in any case "like to call on Mr. Bhutto in jail."

Asghar Khan began his 11-day tour of East Pakistan on 11 December 1968. At an Iftar gathering held at Awami League leader Sheikh Mujibur Rahman's residence at Dhanmondi 32, on the evening of 12 December, Khan revealed that he sought permission to meet Sheikh Mujibur Rahman, who was in military custody. Criticising President Ayub Khan's comments about the substantial funds allocated for East Pakistan's redevelopment, Asghar Khan remarked, "It was a colonial approach." He explained that during the British Raj, "our rulers used to make frequent repetitions of what they (the British) had done for this subcontinent to convince the people that they were here in the interest of the people of this land." Describing this as an "outdated colonial approach," he reiterated that East Pakistan must receive an equal share in all national matters—whether economic or political.

On 15 December 1968 at a rally in Dacca, Syed Mahbub Murshed and Asghar Khan announced their full support for the "legitimate interests" of both East and West Pakistan, advocating for the fullest possible autonomy for East Pakistan. Two days later, Khan was charged by the Government of Pakistan for unlawfully inciting a crowd to assemble. On 29 December, Asghar Khan visited Zulfikar Ali Bhutto who was imprisoned in Sahiwal Jail.

Asghar Khan renounced his Hilal-e-Pakistan and Hilal-e-Quaid-e-Azam awards on 29 January 1969, in protest against President Ayub Khan's regime—which was described as an unprecedented move for an Air Marshal. Asghar Khan rose to the status of a national hero and was often referred to as the "President-in-waiting". Even the government-controlled press under President Ayub Khan regarded him as a potential successor. Similarly, in diplomatic and other discussions, Asghar Khan and Air Vice Marshal Khyber Khan were considered among the likely successors to President Ayub Khan during the collapse of his regime.

After Zulfikar Ali Bhutto had been released from house arrest in February 1969, he went to visit Asghar Khan at his home and again extended an invitation to join his party, the Pakistan People's Party (PPP). However, Khan expressed disinterest, stating that he had no intention of entering politics. When Khan inquired about the party's agenda, Bhutto laughed and looked to his entourage and remarked, "Look at how simple this man is". He then said, "The people are fools; we will deceive them. We will be in power for 20 years, the danda (stick) will be in our hands, and no one will be able to remove us". Asghar Khan replied, "From this day forward I will be in opposition against you". Bhutto replied, "Go ahead, you will see that I am right".

Khan actively campaigned in East Pakistan where he was very popular, advocating for the rights of the people of East Pakistan prior to and after the 1971 War.

Asghar Khan formed the Justice Party (JP) on 13 March 1969. In terms of social justice and economic policies, it was characterised as a left-oriented party, while in its approach to Islamic values, it aligned more with right-wing principles. The first to join the party were veteran Muslim Leaguers such as Mian Bashir Ahmad and his wife, along with Saeed Enver, a former member of the Working Committee of the All-India Muslim League. They were soon followed by Sheikh Khalid Mahmood, the General Secretary of the Kashmir Liberation Movement, Mian Manzar Bashir, a prominent member of the Council Muslim League, Rahim Bux Soomro, and two notable leaders of the Urdu-speaking community, Hafiz Mubarik Ali Shah and Khalid Bin Jaffar, who joined alongside their entire groups.

The Justice Party merged into the Pakistan Democratic Party (PDP) on 24 June 1969, which elected Nurul Amin as its chairman. In this capacity, Asghar Khan was appointed as the Chairman of the Manifesto Committee. Mushtaq Ahmed, author of the book Politics Without Social Change, noted that Asghar Khan was "already an author of a manifesto issued earlier by the Justice Party, which was sufficiently radical, to raise hopes that the draft would be influenced by his thinking".

=== Tehreek-e-Istiqlal and 1970 election ===
Asghar Khan launched his political party, Tehreek-e-Istiqlal (Movement for Solidarity) on 1 March 1970.

Ahead of the December 1970 Pakistani general election, Zulfikar Ali Bhutto and Asghar Khan were among several leaders who declared that, if elected, they would reclaim Indian-administered Kashmir by force. Khan ran for a seat in the National Assembly of Pakistan in the election, with NW-26 Rawalpindi-I as his constituency, he thought its large voting population, connected to the armed forces, would value the contributions of the former Air Marshal. He was the runner-up with 28,209 votes.

=== Opposition and By-Election Campaigns (1971–1977) ===
Following the arrest of Sheikh Mujibur Rahman as part of Operation Searchlight in March 1971, Asghar Khan spearheaded protests demanding his release from prison. The New York Times reported that Khan offered a "conciliatory program" focused on major development efforts in East Pakistan and genuine political freedom for its people, but it was completely censored. On 8 October, he announced his withdrawal from the by-election, stating that no candidate could run unless they had access to the press to reach the public. "Today is a black day for democracy in Pakistan," he said, "when even I, with a mild program breaking no martial-law regulations, am frozen out." After the Pakistan Army occupied East Pakistan and banned the Awami League, the election was effectively annulled. Some elected assemblymen were cleared by the army to take their seats, but most had fled to India or joined the guerrillas.

In a statement issued following a visit to members of his party in Dacca in July 1971, Asghar Khan said the crisis in East Pakistan was the product of political failure and growing Indian involvement rather than an irreversible struggle for independence. He argued that the government needed to address the population's legitimate grievances and restore public confidence. He also warned that alleged Indian interference threatened to deepen instability and undermine Pakistan's unity. He called the coming months decisive for the future of the country and urged members of his party to assist in restoring order and promoting peaceful coexistence among the diverse communities of the region and reflected his belief that national reconciliation and political reform could still preserve a united Pakistan.

In November 1971, Khan was one of the 42 signatories, including Faiz Ahmed Faiz, who urged President Yahya Khan to release Sheikh Mujiubur Rahman. Additionally, Asghar Khan demanded for a public trial of Yahya Khan for his role in the Bengali genocide.

(Retd) Colonel Alim Afridi, Asghar Khan's brother-in-law, openly proposed that Asghar be appointed President of Pakistan instead of Bhutto following the removal of President Yahya Khan in 1971.

By January 1972, Asghar Khan was the first to call for Pakistan's recognition of Bangladesh. In response, President Zulfikar Ali Bhutto called Khan a traitor. In March, Asghar Khan had described President Bhutto as, "a living Yazid". On 20 June, Asghar Khan accused Bhutto of advising former President Yahya Khan to use military force in East Pakistan.

On 10 July, President Bhutto sent Ghulam Qadir Bhutto with 70 armed men who seized and looted Khan's 242 acre farm in Sukkur at 10:30am. President Bhutto's cousin, the Chief Minister of Sindh Mumtaz Bhutto while addressing the Sindh Assembly, said that the Government had nothing to do with the incident. A few weeks later, Khan's home in Abbottabad was burned down, garnering significant public attention. Despite a police investigation, the findings were never disclosed, and Khan's family was forced to live in a stable.

While addressing lawyers of the Peshawar Bar Association on 6 November, Asghar Khan accused Bhutto of allowing Pakistani Prisoners of War of 1971 to remain in India so that he could use their return to his advantage in the next elections. On 30 November, Asghar Khan was attacked by the police and wounded while he was on his way to Multan to investigate the death of a student in a demonstration.

Khwaja Mohammed Rafique, a prominent politician who was the president of the right-wing Pakistan Unity Party, former chief of the Pakistan Democratic Party, and the father of Khawaja Saad Rafique, was fatally shot by unidentified attackers in Lahore on 20 December 1972. He was on his way home after participating in a procession organised by Tehreek-e-Istiqlal, which was led by Asghar Khan. The demonstration, protested primarily against inflation and was held to mark a "black day" on the first anniversary of Zulfikar Ali Bhutto's presidency. Khan described Rafique's "murder in broad daylight, under the very nose of the police", as a "shocking act of gangsterism," and accused Bhutto's government of "aiding and encouraging armed hooligans".

In 1974, Asghar Khan suggested that Pakistan form a defence pact with China in order to combat a potential nuclear threat from India.

Asghar Khan was detained by Prime Minister Zulfikar Ali Bhutto's Federal Security Force on 1 December 1974. This occurred because Bhutto, who was on a political tour, wanted to prevent Khan from holding rallies. In response, Tehreek-e-Istiqlal threatened to organise demonstrations at Pakistani embassies worldwide to protest the unlawful detention of their leader. On 17 December, Ahmad Raza Khan Kasuri informed the National Assembly that Asghar Khan had been forcibly confined in a house in Hyderabad, Sindh for the past four days, with 100 security personnel surrounding the premises.

General Ayub Khan, Bhutto, and General Zia-ul-Haq notably placed Asghar Khan under house arrest, with his detention under General Zia lasting 1,603 days.

=== Assassination attempts ===
Throughout his reign, Prime Minister Zulfikar Ali Bhutto attempted to have Asghar Khan, Ghulam Mustafa Khar, Shah Ahmad Noorani, and Sherbaz Khan Mazari assassinated.

On 23 May 1973, Asghar Khan had boarded a Pakistan International Airlines flight at Quetta Airport, when all passengers were instructed to disembark and identify their luggage. One suitcase went unclaimed. Khan was informed that this procedure was implemented due to reports that a suitcase containing a bomb had been loaded onto the aircraft. The suitcase was neither opened nor inspected in the presence of passengers and despite widespread media coverage of the incident, the government provided no explanation.

On 26 July 1973, Asghar Khan's vehicle was chased by armed men in a jeep and two trucks. One of the men fired shots at Khan. Shortly afterwards, the press discovered that the jeep was registered in the name of Inspector General Sindh Police, Chaudhary Fazal-e-Haq.

In 1975 on Pakistan Day, a reception was arranged at the Lahore Railway Station for Asghar Khan as he was passing through the city. The Federal Security Force (FSF), Bhutto's secret police, arranged for a bomb to be planted in the train. FSF Agent Riaz was caught in the act by the police. However, the FSF had exerted pressure leading to his eventual release.

=== 1977 elections campaign ===
Prime Minister Zulfikar Ali Bhutto announced on 7 January 1977 that new elections would be held on 7 March. In preparation, Khan was instrumental in organising the Pakistan National Alliance (PNA), a group of parties opposed to Bhutto and his government. Approaching the election date, Khan gained recognition as the most prominent opposition leader.

The Pakistan Times was ordered by Zulfikar Ali Bhutto to air propaganda and "expose" Asghar Khan. However, as the campaign developed, Bhutto called it off saying he didn't want a full-scale campaign against Khan because "that will be stupid and give him importance and blow him up", instead he directed that Khan should be "exposed surreptitiously and casually, without building a media campaign against him." In another attempt, he desired that Khan should be portrayed as a "joker" so that the people should learn through the press "that we have a clown in our midst." Asghar Khan was therefore spared from an orchestrated campaign although like other opposition leaders, he was continuously subjected to character assassination and slanderous attacks by the media. On occasion, false and fabricated reports were planted in the press about him.

During discussions, it was concluded that the opposition parties were too divided to present a united front against the People's Party. Asghar Khan was approached by Sherbaz Khan Mazari and Abdul Ghafoor Ahmed to join the United Democratic Front (UDF) but declined due to previous negative experiences with alliances. Despite efforts, Asghar Khan and Maulana Noorani only agreed to meet other UDF leaders. They set conditions for joining that mainly concerned the allocation of seats. Bhutto aimed to prevent Asghar Khan from gaining a leadership position within the opposition alliance, eventually securing Mufti Mehmood as the head of the PNA. Zulfikar Ali Bhutto and his advisers were overly confident, believing there was no threat in any alliance that wasn't led by Asghar Khan. In their view, any such alliance was insignificant compared to the Pakistan People's Party (PPP).

In preparations for the election, Asghar Khan and Zulfikar Ali Bhutto, traded barbs with each other, with Khan calling him a rat from Larkana who "could not recite a single verse from the Quran and yet claimed to be a good Muslim". Khan further attacked Bhutto by saying, "With full responsibility I say that Bhutto is not a Muslim. In Peshawar, I challenge him that if he offers the Namaz on T.V. within ten days, I shall retire from the contest. Since 1 February, Maulana Ehtisham ul Haq Thanvi, has been teaching him Namaz, but he has not been able to learn it".

Asghar Khan attracted massive crowds during rallies leading up to the 1977 general election, with the BBC reporting that over 1.6 million people attended his rally in February. While speaking at an election rally in Rawalpindi on 4 February, Asghar Khan criticised the economic policies of the Government of Pakistan and said that the extravagance on the governments part was responsible for the rising prices in the country. He cited examples of government overspending and said that 80 percent of the industry was at a standstill after the takeover of industrial units by the Government, which discouraged investment.

During the campaign, Asghar Khan drew attention with a fiery speech at a rally at Kohala Bridge, where he declared that, if he came into power, he would hang Prime Minister Zulfikar Ali Bhutto at that very spot.

In March, Khan won the election in NA-13 Abbottabad-II with 35,711 votes and in NA-190 Karachi VIII with 44,252 votes, securing a seat in the 6th National Assembly. He had contested the election in multiple constituencies, including NA-1 Peshawar, NA-38 Rawalpindi, and NA-12 Abbottabad, finishing second in all three with 34,040, 40,037, and 26,954 votes, respectively.

==== Post-election period ====
Following the riots after the elections, which the opposition stated were rigged, widespread protests erupted across Pakistan, resulting in the deaths of 85 people and the imposition of martial law by Prime Minister Zulfikar Ali Bhutto. Asghar Khan, who was imprisoned shortly after, refused to leave jail until Bhutto resigned, all political prisoners were released, and the government lifted a seven-year state of emergency. On 9 April 1977, Khan's wife Amina Shamsie, was arrested while participating in a women's procession in Lahore and beaten up by the police, receiving injuries and was imprisoned for a day. A few days later, Amina was arrested at another procession in Rawalpindi and kept for three weeks in detention in Dadar, Mansehra. Asghar Khan was lodged in the same room when he was arrested.

On 1 May, in a statement smuggled out of Sihala jail, Asghar Khan declared that the Pakistan National Alliance (PNA) would not compromise on its demand for Prime Minister Bhutto's resignation or the holding of new elections. He also urged the army to defy orders issued by what he called the "illegal" government. On 6 May, the Interior Ministry announced it was considering legal action against Asghar Khan for sedition, as well as against his wife, who was suspected of smuggling out his statement. She was placed under house arrest on 10 May. Then, on 12 May, Prime Minister Bhutto accused Asghar Khan of high treason during a speech in the National Assembly.

While imprisoned in Kot Lakhpat Jail, Asghar Khan read a newspaper report about a Pakistan Army Major who had executed a boy for making a V sign towards him on 21 May 1977, during the martial law imposed by Prime Minister Bhutto. This incident prompted him to write a letter condemning the army's actions and urging officers to discern between lawful and unlawful commands amid Bhutto's severe crackdown on nationwide protests against the rigged March 1977 elections. Khan further said, "It is not your duty to support his illegal regime nor can you be called upon to kill your own people so that he can continue in office a little longer. Let it not be said that the Pakistan armed forces are a degenerate police force fit only for killing unarmed civilians." His remarks were misinterpreted as a call for military intervention, as two months later, General Zia-ul-Haq would carry out the 1977 Pakistani military coup that overthrew Bhutto's government.

==== Next arrest, release, and other activities ====
In September 1979, President Zia-ul-Haq placed Asghar Khan under house arrest. He was released on 18 March 1980 by the courts. Following this, Khan called for the overthrow of President Zia, and referred to him as "a usurper who led a ruthless junta which ruled by deceit and lies... General Zia and army rule must be replaced. Zia has no intention of letting democracy function. Any general who might replace him will be the same... As long as this junta remains in power, this country suffers". Asghar Khan was seen as a possible successor to President Zia after he promised to restore to a civilian government in 1979.

In April 1980, Ghaus Bakhsh Bizenjo proposed a joint manifesto as part of an anti-government alliance between his National Party and Asghar Khan's Tehreek-e-Istiqlal. The draft manifesto, submitted for Khan's approval, sought to limit the central government's authority to defence, foreign affairs, communications, and currency—while allowing provincial units the right to secede if Islamabad violated their constitutional rights. Before Khan could respond, he was arrested by police in Karachi on 7 May 1980 for calling for the overthrow of General Zia-ul-Haq's regime. In the meantime, Bizenjo circulated copies of the draft, which was never published, to a small circle of Baluch leaders.

Asghar Khan was released on 29 May and exiled from Karachi. Upon arriving in Peshawar, he was arrested again. The provincial government announced his detention without providing any reason, and he was denied access to a lawyer until 26 June. Initially held at his Abbottabad home, he was moved to Dadar sub-jail on 6 August, where he remained in solitary confinement until 3 October. Due to his worsening health, he was transferred back to Abbottabad and treated at the local military hospital, where his immediate family was allowed to visit him. By late 1981, he remained in detention under Martial Law Order 78, and Amnesty International recognised him as a prisoner of conscience.

General Zia-ul-Haq amended the constitution to block any legal challenges to his military courts and martial law government on 29 May 1980. Opposition party leaders, including senior members of Asghar Khan's Tehreek-e-Istiqlal were arrested under Martial Law Order No. 78 on 5 August 1980.

In February 1981, Asghar Khan and Nasim Wali Khan came together to form the Movement for the Restoration of Democracy, a political alliance against General Zia-ul-Haq.

On 1 October 1984, the Government of the North-West Frontier Province released Asghar Khan, Naseerullah Babar, and Aftab Ahmad Khan Sherpao. Reportedly, they were the only political detainees in the province.

Governor of Sindh, Lt General Jahan Dad Khan, imposed a 30-day ban on Asghar Khan's entry into Sindh effective 14 October 1984, the day Khan was released from five years of house arrest. Asghar Khan had planned to start an eight-day tour of Sindh from Sukkur on 20 October, and then travel to Quetta and Punjab. Consequently, he revised his itinerary to visit various cities in the North-West Frontier Province at the end of October instead.

=== Later election campaigns (1985–1990) ===
In 1985, Asghar Khan warned that Pakistan's emerging drug mafia could influence the upcoming general election if precautions were not taken. In April, Khan said that Pakistan could not afford to maintain permanent hostility with the Soviet Union and should begin dialogue with the Babrak Karmal government in Afghanistan. He contended that General Zia-ul-Haq could not reject such talks on the grounds that the Kabul regime lacked legitimacy, as both Karmal and Zia were, in his words, "sailing in the same boat."

Following the elections, Khan traveled to Kabul on 29 August 1987 and met with President Dr. Najibullah in September 1987, amid rising tensions between Afghanistan–Pakistan. The Government of Pakistan referred to Khan as "Brutus" for opposing the state narrative and campaigning for friendship between the two countries. Prior to his visit, Khan had demanded direct talks between the two countries and severely criticised Pakistan's growing subservience to the United States.

A few days before the Death of Zia-ul-Haq in August 1988, Asghar Khan joined forces with Benazir Bhutto. Khan was the runner-up in the 1990 general election for the National Assembly seat NA-95 (Lahore) receiving 39,585 votes, losing to Nawaz Sharif. The election results were heavily influenced by rigging, with Nawaz securing victory through the support of President Ghulam Ishaq Khan, Generals Aslam Beg, Hamid Gul, Asad Durrani, and the Inter-Services Intelligence, who worked to buy the loyalties of various politicians.

=== Diminishing role ===
Asghar Khan's Tehrik-e-Istiqlal (TI) was among three parties who merged to form the Qaumi Jamhoori Party (QJP) led by his son, Omar Asghar Khan, on 4 December 2001.

On 25 October 2003, as President of the Qaumi Jamhoori Party (QJP), Asghar Khan met with Indian peace activist Nirmala Deshpande, who was accompanied by Abdul Rashid Shaheen, a member of the Lok Sabha, and Pakistani MNAs Chaudhry Manzoor Ahmed and Qamar Zaman Kaira. He welcomed their visit and underscored the importance of such exchanges. He also praised Deshpande's efforts in fostering people-to-people connections and expressed hope that both governments would respond positively.

Welcoming the Indian government's 12-point announcement and calling it a step toward reducing tensions between the two nuclear rivals in South Asia, Asghar Khan expressed hope that such initiatives could build confidence between India and Pakistan and make travel between the two easier. However, Khan reiterated his long-held position on Kashmir, advocating for its independence with both India and Pakistan sharing responsibility for its defence. He stressed that without sincere efforts from both sides to engage in meaningful dialogue, any improvement in relations would be short-lived.

== Later life ==
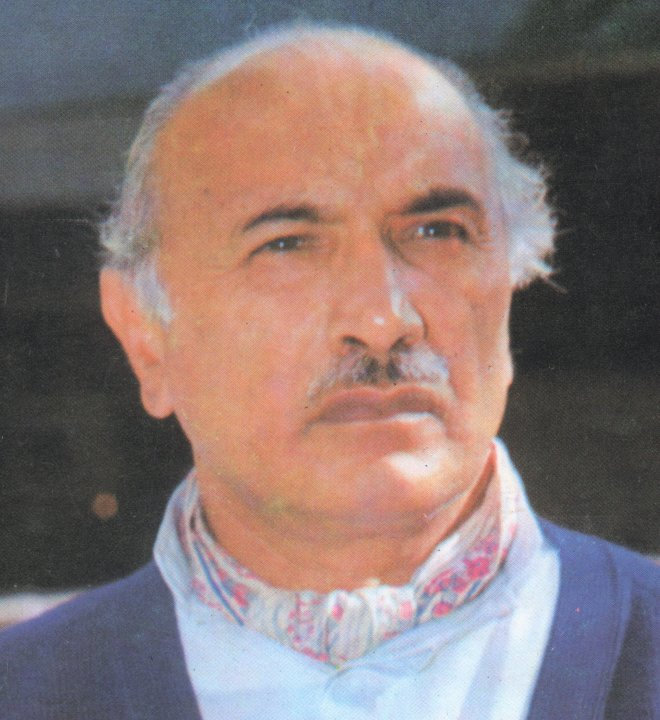
Asghar Khan in 2008

Asghar Khan wrote several books throughout his life and was the chief patron of the Defence Journal in Pakistan.

In March 1998, Bangladesh demanded that Pakistan apologise for the Bengali genocide committed by the Pakistan Army and their collaborators. As President of the Pakistan National Conference, Asghar Khan supported Dhaka's move and stated that Pakistan would never be able to absolve itself from the "tragedy of East Pakistan" despite a lapse of 27 years.

In July 1998, Asghar Khan, Nur Khan, and Saeedullah Khan, were among 63 retired Pakistani, Indian, and Bengali armed forces personnel who signed an agreement urging Pakistan and India to refrain from developing nuclear weapons. Instead, they advocated for limiting nuclear research and development strictly to peaceful and beneficial purposes. They also called for the two countries to resolve their disputes through peaceful means and address their real problems of poverty and backwardness, rather than wasting their scarce resources on acquiring means of destruction.

Asghar Khan launched his book, We've Learnt Nothing from History —Pakistan: Politics and Military Power, on 1 July 2005 at a ceremony in Karachi. Others in attendance included Sherbaz Khan Mazari, Ardeshir Cowasjee, and Abdul Hafeez Shaikh.

On 20 April 2009, at a ceremony held at the Marriott hotel in Islamabad, the Jinnah Society posthumously awarded the 2007 Jinnah Award to Ahmad Ali Khan, former Chief Editor of Dawn, while the 2006 award went to Asghar Khan, in honour of his 'exceptional contributions to democracy and human rights in Pakistan.'

In his acceptance speech, Khan expressed gratitude to the ceremony's organisers for the award. He then addressed the societal challenges that deviated from Mohammad Ali Jinnah's vision for the country: "What we have done since 1948 is not the vision of the Quaid. It has rapidly led us to civil war. The United States and (General) Zia played a major role in mobilising the youths of the NWFP against the Soviets. The results can be seen today.. Pakistan has been led at different times by acknowledged criminals."

He further advocated for reducing the national defence budget and said, "The criminal misuse of Pakistan's natural resources has cost Pakistan dearly. We must have a close look at our defence expenditure." Khan was openly critical of the country's nuclear program, remarking that it had "endangered Pakistan's very survival," while the Pakistan Army's spokesperson Maj. Gen. Athar Abbas was present in the audience.

After the Killing of Osama bin Laden in Asghar Khan's hometown of Abbottabad in 2011, he told Newsweek Pakistan, "I was surprised. I don't think anyone knew about it, but they should have known. Here was this man living inside the cantonment and not a soul had a clue. Arabs in the middle of Abbottabad! Yet, no one knew for five or six years. The level of incompetence is fantastic." A year later, when Newsline asked him about the incident, he replied, "That was a very odd thing that happened, odd that nobody knew about it. I wonder what is taking the commission [investigating the incident] so long. And what of Memogate? I don't understand what's going on."

On 20 October 2011, at the launch ceremony for Imran Khan's book, Pakistan: A Personal History, Asghar Khan took the podium and stated:

"In the last over 60 years, India has never attacked Pakistan, as it can't afford it. Indians know well, if Pakistan is destroyed, they will be the next target, It was made our problem that one day India would invade us. But we did so four times and the first attack was on Kashmir, where Maharaja was not prepared to accede to India for he wanted to join Pakistan and waited for this for 21 days...Indian forces came to East Pakistan when people were being slaughtered there. Moreover, again at Kargil, Indian never mounted an assault."

— Asghar Khan,

He further remarked that the majority in Pakistan voted for corrupt politicians, as they too sought to have their work accomplished "by hook or by crook." He recalled his dismay upon learning years prior that, in Punjab, 20,000 individuals with criminal records had been recruited into the Punjab Police, while a significant number of dacoits were hired into the Sindh Police.

Asghar Khan merged his party, Tehrik-e-Istiqlal with Pakistan Tehreek-e-Insaf (PTI) on 12 December 2011 and announced his full support for Imran Khan. He praised Imran for his efforts, endorsing him as the last hope for Pakistan's survival. Asghar stated, "There is panic all around the country. The price hike is touching the skies. The country's economy is on the verge of collapse. People want change, and the PTI is the only party that can provide that".

== Published works ==
=== English ===
- Mohammad Asghar Khan (May 1967). Obituary note for Air Commodore Masroor Hosain.
- Pakistan at the Cross Roads. Karachi: Ferozsons. 1969. OCLC 116825.
- "MESSAGE: To The Officers Of The Defence Services of Pakistan". 21 May 1977.
- The First Round, Indo-Pakistan War 1965. Sahibabad: Vikas. 1979. ISBN 0-7069-0978-X.
- Generals in Politics. New Delhi: Vikas. 1983. ISBN 0-7069-2215-8.
- Islam, Politics, and the State: The Pakistan Experience. Zed Books. 1985. ISBN 0-86232-471-8.
- The Lighter side of the Power Game. Lahore: Jang Publishers. 1985. OCLC 15107608.
- We've Learnt Nothing from History. Karachi: Oxford University Press. 2005. ISBN 0-19-597883-8.
- My Political Struggle. Karachi: Oxford University Press. 2008. ISBN 978-0-19-547620-0.
- Milestones in a Political Journey. Islamabad: Dost Publications. 2009. ISBN 978-9694963556.

=== Urdu ===
- Mohammad Asghar Khan (1969). Shaheen-e-Millat. Lahore. OCLC 11262262.
- Sada-i-Hosh. Lahore: Jang Publishers. 1985. OCLC 14214332.
- Chehray nahi Nizam ko Badlo. Islamabad: Dost Publications. 1998. ISBN 978-9694960401.
- Islam – Jamhooriat aur Pakistan. Islamabad: Dost Publications. 1999. ISBN 978-9694960852.
- Ye Batain Hakim Logon Ki. Islamabad: Dost Publications. 1999. ISBN 978-9694960876.

== Illness and death ==
At the age of 96, Asghar Khan died at 6:00 AM PKT on 5 January 2018, at CMH Rawalpindi from Cardiac arrest.

He was admitted to intensive care on 30 December 2017 after his health deteriorated; he had been suffering from acute respiratory infection, dementia, and ischemic heart disease. He was given a state funeral by the Government of Pakistan which was attended by Prime Minister Shahid Khaqan Abbasi, General Zubair Mahmood Hayat, Air Chief Marshal Sohail Aman, Admiral Zafar Mahmood Abbasi, Federal Ministers, several former Air Force chiefs, government officials, bureaucrats, and the general public. Afterwards, the coffin was transported via helicopter to his native village of Nawan Shehr, where Asghar Khan was buried beside his son Omar.

A formation of four K-8 Karakorum and four T-37 Tweet aircraft from the PAF Academy presented a fly past in honour of Khan, flying the missing man formation.

=== Reactions ===
Air Chief Marshal, Sohail Aman described Asghar as Father of the Pakistan Air Force during his tribute.

Pakistan Tehreek-e-Insaf Chairman Imran Khan shared his condolences on Twitter: "Saddened to learn of Air Chief Marshal Asghar Khan's death early this morning. He transformed the PAF and was a man of steadfast principles and integrity. My prayers and condolences go to his family".

Retired Air Commodore Sajad Haider paid tribute to Asghar Khan, whom he regarded as one of the "greatest sons of the soil." Haider described him as an "unparalleled commander-in-chief," who earned the "respect and admiration of all those he led through his qualities of vision, courage, integrity, honesty, and strict dedication to discipline". Haider recalled that under Khan's leadership, Flt Lt M. Yunis shot down an Indian spy bomber that violated Pakistani airspace in 1959. The early air defence system Khan prioritised proved effective, resulting in Yunis bringing the bomber down at 40,000 feet, which was noted as being far beyond the operational capability of PAF fighters, with both the Indian pilot and navigator ejecting from their aircraft and taken into custody. Haider said that the indomitable spirit instilled by Asghar Khan propelled the Air Force during the Indo-Pakistani War of 1965 and that the air force would continue to build upon the solid foundations he laid.

The spokesperson of the Pakistan Army, Major General Asif Ghafoor said, "COAS expresses his grief on the sad demise of ex Air Chief, Air Marshal Asghar Khan, Retired. An iconic soldier who will be remembered for his historic contributions for laying foundations of a strong Pakistan Air Force. May Allah bless his soul-Ameen".

Former pilot Peter A. Thatcher, recalled a near-death experience in 1962 during his second solo flight at the Peshawar Flying Club. While flying at 1,000 feet, four Canberra bombers nearly collided with him, narrowly dipping below his plane. Later, as he approached the runway with zero visibility, another Canberra came close to crashing into him. Shaken but alive, Thatcher landed safely. A confrontation with an angry Air Marshal Asghar Khan followed, but his instructor, Hyder Hassan Rizvi, a retired IAF squadron leader, intervened and convinced Khan that the tower was at fault. Thatcher later met Khan at a dinner party, where they laughed about the incident. He also remembered the air marshal's stance on Pakistan's nuclear program, suggesting that the country would be safer without nukes, though acknowledging Pakistan would never give them up.

Retired PAF officer Aijazuddin recalled joining the RPAF Flying Training School in 1947/48, when Asghar Khan was the Commandant. In a tribute to Khan, he described him as a principled and resolute leader, and noted that he embodied the qualities of a complete officer and expressed his condolences to the family.

== Commemorations ==
On 23 March 2017, at a ceremony with Khan as the chief guest, the PAF Academy was renamed to Pakistan Air Force Academy Asghar Khan. The event was attended by Chief of Air Staff Sohail Aman, alongside former air chiefs, war veterans, and serving officers.

The auditorium at the Pakistan International Airlines training center, located at the airlines head office in Karachi, was renamed to Asghar Khan Auditorium and inaugurated by Maulana Tariq Jameel on 19 December 2019.

== Dates of rank ==
Insignia	Rank	Date
	Air Marshal	5 November 1958
	Air Vice Marshal	23 July 1957
	Air Commodore	17 April 1954
	Group Captain	1949
	Wing Commander	15 September 1947
	Squadron Leader	28 August 1945
	Flight Lieutenant	1 October 1944
	Flying Officer	3 April 1942
	Pilot Officer	22 December 1940
	Second Lieutenant	3 January 1940

== Awards and decorations ==
- Order of Aeronautical Merit (Spain) (1957)
- Hilal-e-Quaid-e-Azam (1958)
- Nishan-i-Taj (1959)
- Certificate of Supersonic Recognition: Order of F-104 Starfighters (1960)
- Order of the Crown of Thailand (1962)
- Hilal-i-Pakistan (1962)
- Gold Medal Human Rights Society of Pakistan (1985)
- Jinnah Award (2006)

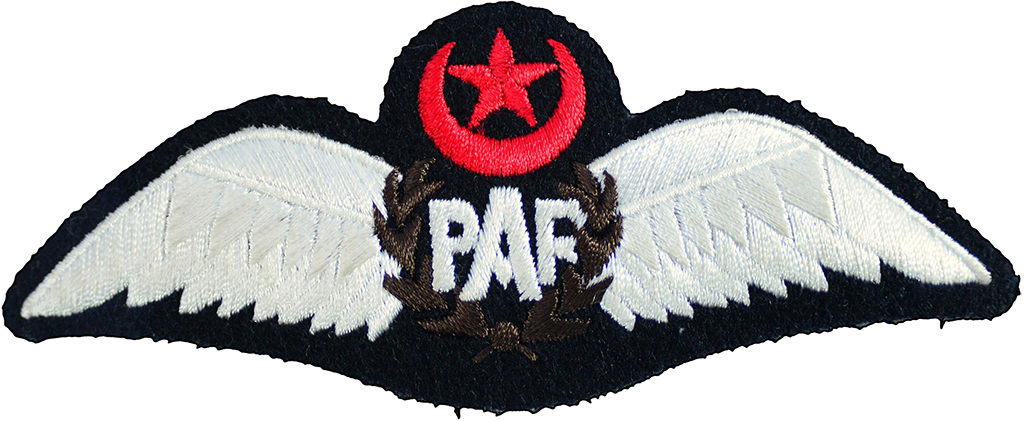

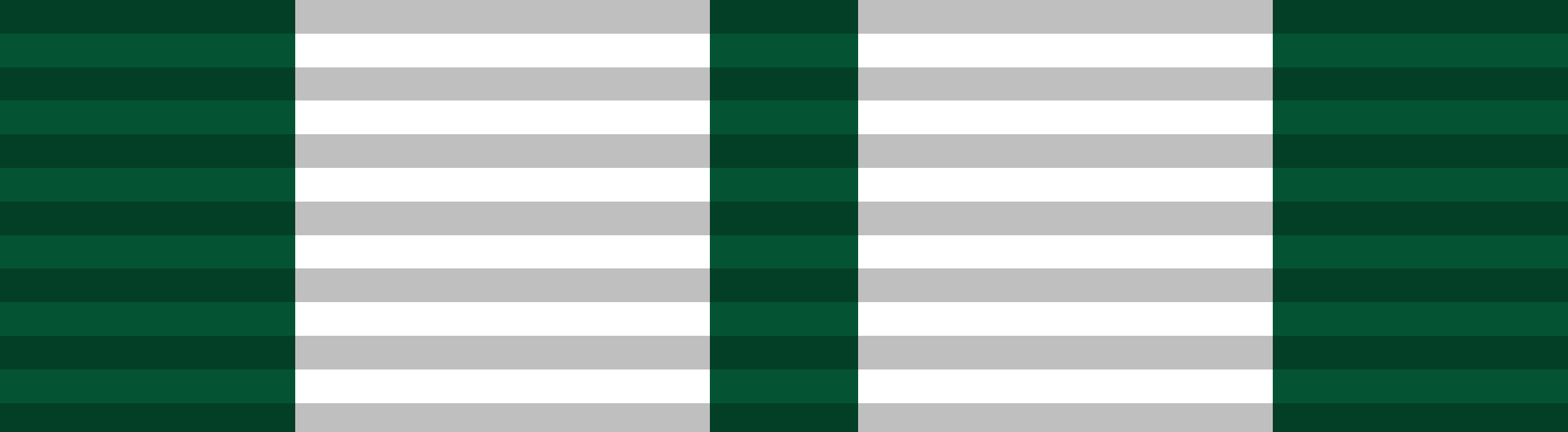

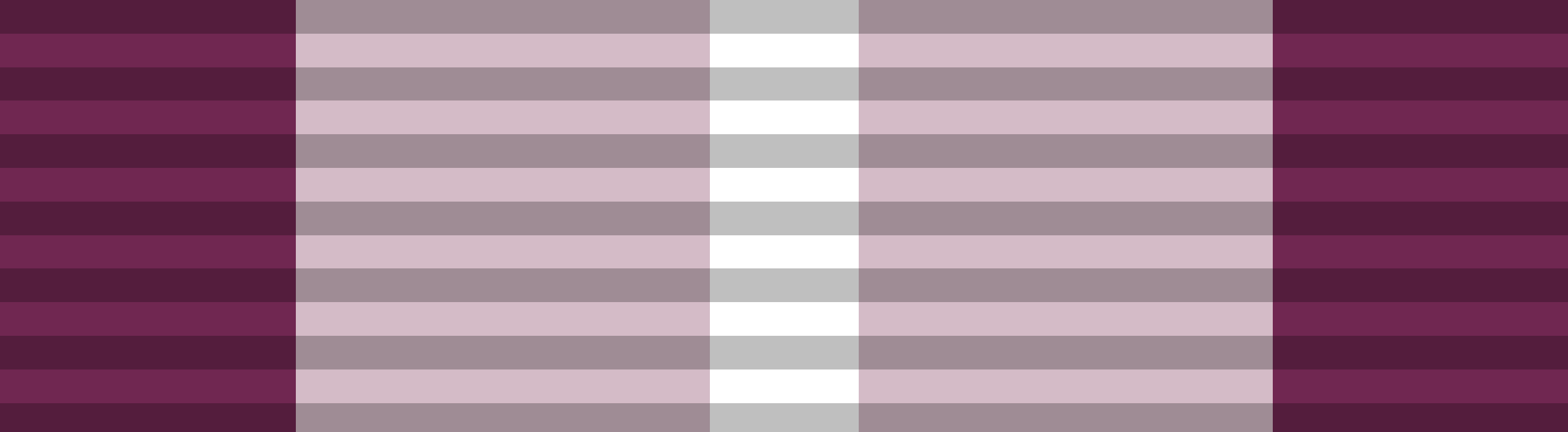

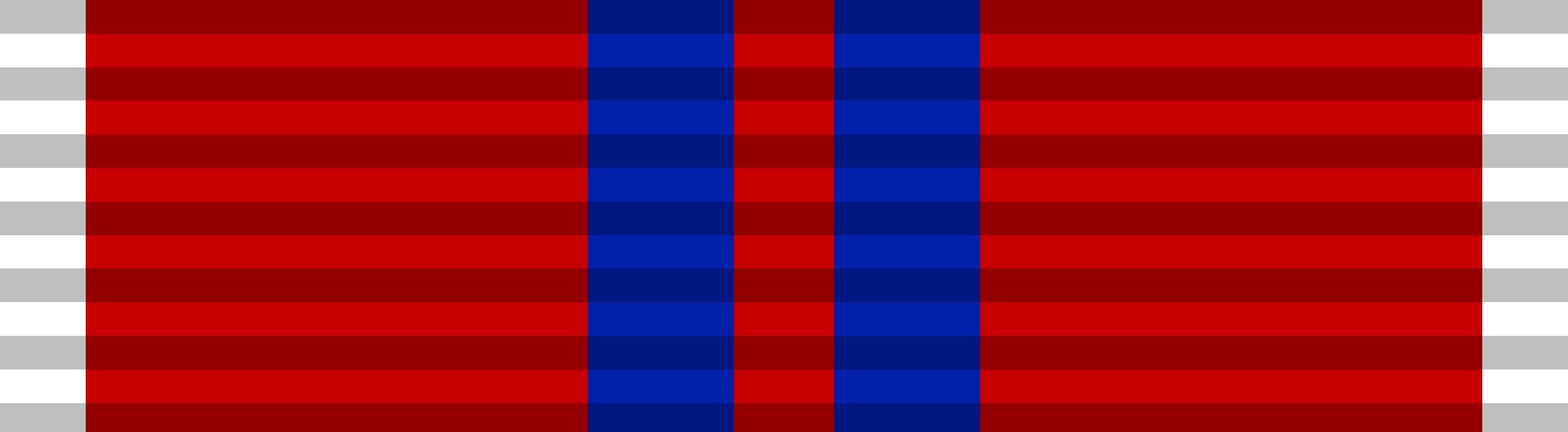

PAF GD(P) Badge RED (More than 3000 Flying Hours)
Hilal-e-Pakistan (Crescent of Pakistan); 1962		Hilal-e-Quaid-e-Azam (Crescent of Quaid-e-Azam); 1958	
Burma Star	War Medal 1939-1945	Pakistan Medal (Tamgha-e-Pakistan); 1947	Nishan-i-Taj (Order of the Crown of Iran); 1951
Queen Elizabeth II Coronation Medal 1953	Tamgha-e-Qayam-e-Jamhuria (Republic Commemoration Medal); 1956	Order of Aeronautical Merit (Spain) (Grand Cross); 1957	Order of the Crown of Thailand (Knight Grand Cross) (First Class); 1962

== Gallery ==
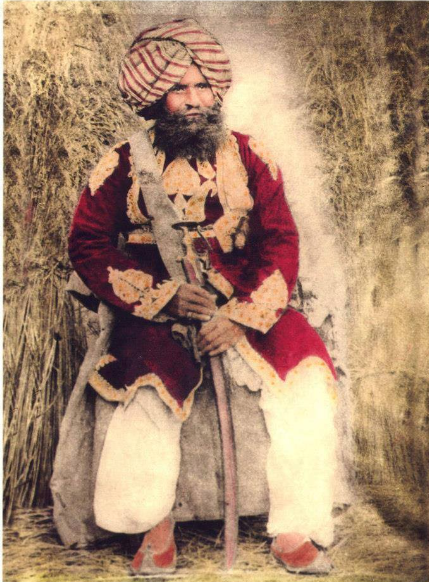
Asghar's grandfather, Sardar Samad Khan Afridi

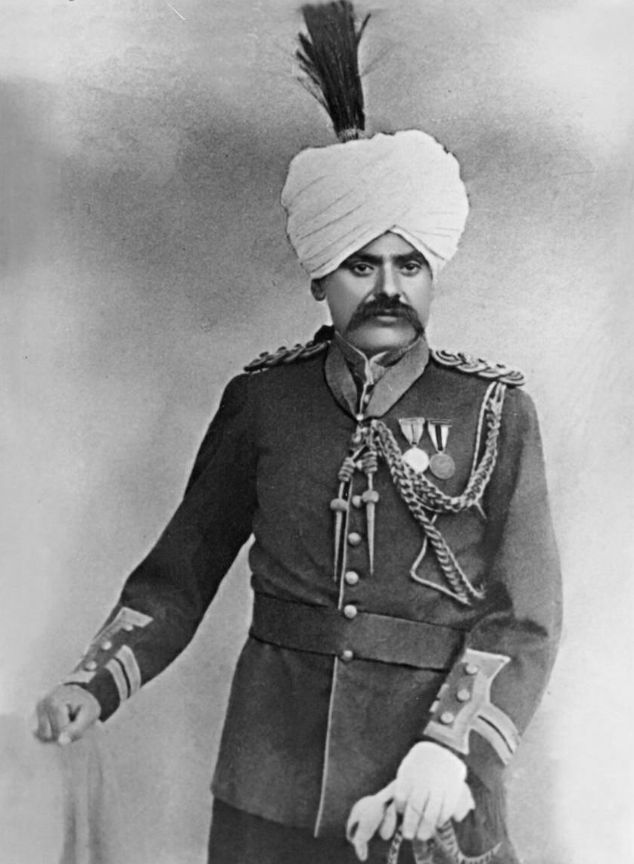
Asghar's uncle, Samundar Khan Afridi, was a general in the army of Maharaja Hari Singh, c. 1945

== Notes ==
Military offices
Preceded by Arthur McDonald	Commander-in-Chief; 1957–1965	Succeeded by Nur Khan
