= Tehreek-e-Istiqlal =

Tehreek-e-Istiqlal تحریک استقلال
- Leader: Asghar Khan
- Founder: Asghar Khan
- Founded: 1970; 56 years ago
- Dissolved: 2012
- Merged into: Pakistan Tehreek-e-Insaf
- Ideology: Islamic democracy Pakistani nationalism Progressivism; Mixed economy Reformism; Welfarism; Minority rights
- Political position: Centre
- Religion: Islam

Tehreek-e-Istiqlal (Urdu: تحریک استقلال) was a political party in Pakistan. It was once the second most popular political party in Pakistan. It was formed by Air Marshal Retd. Asghar Khan in 1970.

In the 1970s, Tehrik-i-Istiqlal, many prominent public figures were active members of Tehrik-i-Istiqlal including Nawaz Sharif, Khurshid Mahmud Kasuri, Allama Aqeel Turabi, Aitzaz Ahsan, Sheikh Rashid Ahmad, Javed Hashmi, Nawab Akbar Khan Bugti, Mushahid Hussain Syed, Mehnaz Rafi, Raja Nadir Pervez, Gohar Ayub Khan, Nisar Khoro, Nafees Siddiqui, Ashraf Liaqat Ali Khan, Zafar Ali Shah, Ahmed Raza Kasuri, Muhammad Iqbal Khan, Sher Afgan Niazi, Manzoor Wattoo, Musheer Pesh Imam, Syeda Abida Hussain, Syed Fakhar Imam, Raja Niaz Khan (AJK) and many others.

After the controversial 1977 Pakistani general election, General Zia-ul-Haq seized power and banned political parties. Under Zia, Asghar Khan was placed under house arrest which lasted 1,603 days. Upon being released, Asghar Khan joined the newly formed Movement for the Restoration of Democracy (MRD) in 1983 and was detained by the government.

In the 1990 Pakistani general election, it entered into an alliance with Pakistan Peoples Party for electoral calculus.

In January 2012, Tehreek-e-Istiqlal announced merging with the Pakistan Tehreek-e-Insaf.

== History ==
=== Formation ===
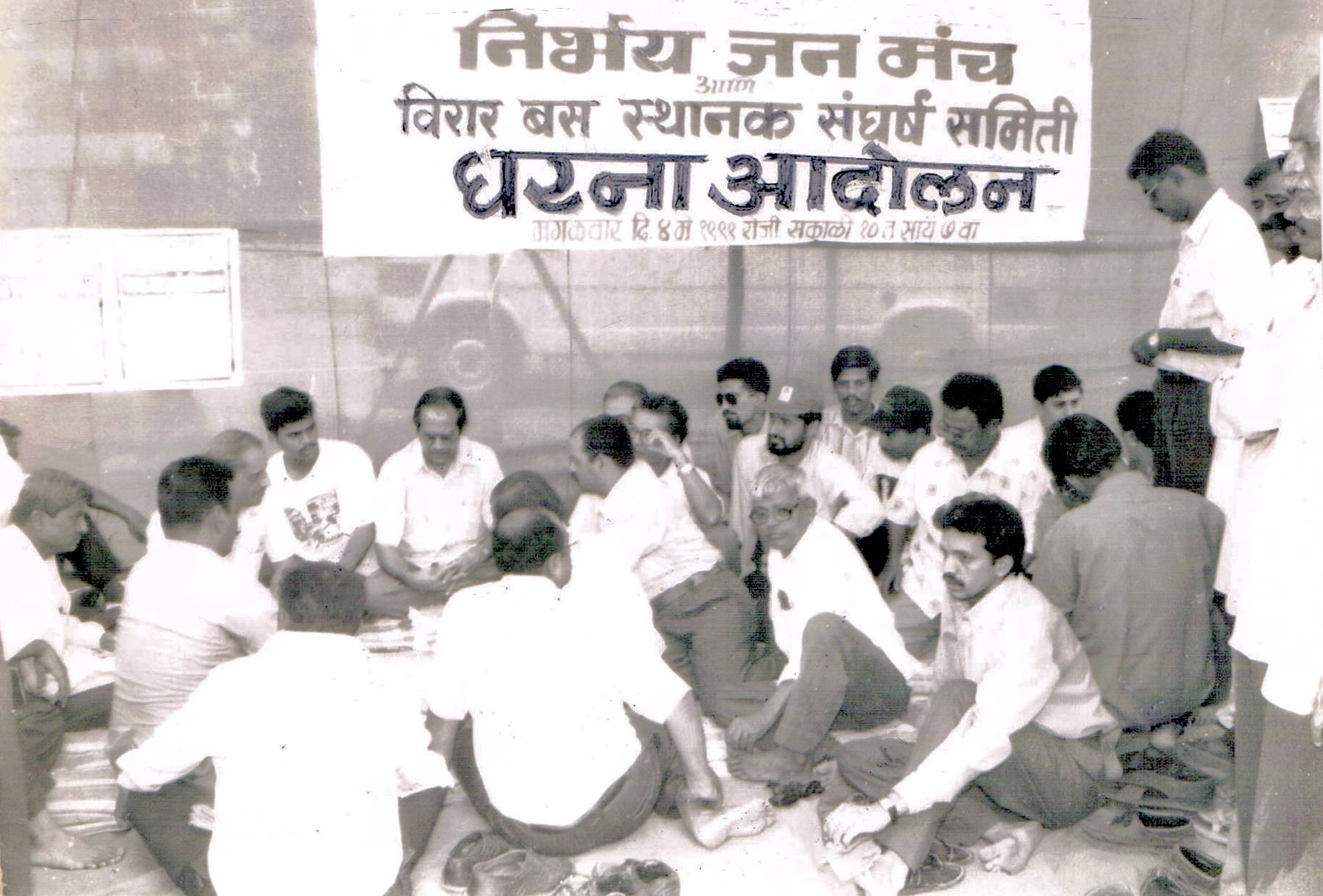
An example of Dharna. Asghar Khan instigated multiple Dharna movements to remove the elected civilian governments in Pakistan over the accusations of monetary corruption throughout the 1970s and 1990s.

After retiring from the military, Air Marshal Asghar Khan in 1969 founded the Lahore-based Justice Party. By the time of the 1970 elections, he had resigned from the Justice Party to found the Tehreek-e-Istiqlal (TeI) party. Asghar Khan announced he was forming the Tehreek-e-Istiqlal (lit. Movement for Solidarity Party) in response to Zulfikar Ali Bhutto's announcement of the formation of the Pakistan Peoples Party (PPP).

The TeI was a centrist political party founded in direct opposition to the left-wing PPP, though both were opposing the Ayub administration. Despite its centerist and secular program, the TeI attracted the right-wing conservative vote bank and support from the Muttahida Majlis-e-Amals ultraconservative clergy. During the election campaign in 1969–70, Khan placed the blame on Zulfikar Ali Bhutto for starting the second war with India in 1965 after reading a statement from Ayub Khan after meeting the latter.

=== Violence against Istiqlal members ===
Khwaja Mohammed Rafique, a prominent politician who was the president of the right-wing Pakistan Unity Party and former chief of the Pakistan Democratic Party, was fatally shot by unidentified attackers in Lahore on 20 December 1972. He was on his way home after participating in a procession organized by TeI, which was led by Asghar Khan. The demonstration, protested primarily against inflation and was held to mark a "black day" on the first anniversary of Zulfikar Ali Bhutto's presidency. Asghar Khan described Khwaja's death as "murder in broad daylight, under the very nose of the police", as a "shocking act of gangsterism." He accused the Government of Zulfikar Ali Bhutto of aiding and encouraging armed "hooligans".

At the end of a Pakistan Peoples Party procession on 29 April 1973, members of the ruling party attacked the home of Sheikh Hafiz, Vice President of Tehrik-i-Istiqlal Lahore. During the assault, his nephew, Sheikh Javed Nazir, was seriously injured and succumbed to his injuries two days later.

=== Activities of party ===
During the nationwide 1970 Pakistani general elections, Party decided to run on the Rawalpindi's constituencies, believing that the city's population would vote in appreciation of a retired air force official. However, Khan lost the election to the less-known politician, Khurshid Hasan Mir of the Pakistan Peoples Party (PPP); the Tehrik-e-Istiqlal (TeI) generally lost the election without winning any seats for the National Assembly of Pakistan as the PPP had performed well to claim the exclusive mandate in the Four Provinces of Pakistan.

After the disastrous Indo-Pakistani War of 1971, the third war with India, Khan joined the National Assembly, only to be served in the Opposition bench led by Wali Khan of the left-winged Awami National Party.< after Yahya administration turned over the civilian government to Zulfikar Ali Bhutto as President, Khan accused Bhutto of escalating the situation that led to the creation of Bangladesh and noting that: "We are living virtually under one-party state... The outstanding feature is suppression."

In 1973, criticism of Prime Minister Bhutto grew further and Khan held him directly responsible for authorizing the 1970s military operations to curb nationalism in Balochistan, Pakistan. In 1974, Khan criticized the nationalization of industry in Pakistan and his party benefitted from financial support from industrialists such as Nawaz Sharif, Javed Hashmi, Shuja'at Hussain to oppose such policy measures. In 1975–76, Khan eventually supported and was instrumental in forming the National Front, a massive nine-party conservative alliance, and was said to be determined to oust Bhutto and his party from the government and power.

The party participated in the 1977 Pakistani general election on previous constituency but lost the elections to less-known politicians, much to his surprise. The party refused election results and leveled charges on the government of vote rigging, immediately calling for the massive dharnas against the government. When provincial governments led the arrests of workers from the National Front, it was reported by historians that it was Khan who penned a letter to the Chairman Joint Chiefs Admiral Mohammad Shariff and Army Chief General Zia-ul-Haq reminding them of not to obey the law of their civilian superiors. Excerpts of this letter was later published by the historians as Khan later asking the military to renounce their support for the "Illegal regime of Bhutto", and asked the military leadership to "differentiate between a "lawful and an unlawful" command... and save Pakistan.".

To the historians and observer, the letter was a pivot for the military to engage in establishing martial law against Prime Minister Bhutto in 1977. party leader khan was reportedly offered a cabinet post in the Zia administration but he declined to serve.

=== Imprisonment of Asghar Khan and political struggle to maintain image ===
After the imposing of martial law by the bloodless 5 July 1977 Operation Fair Play coup by the Army Chief, General Muhammad Zia-ul-Haq, Khan began opposing the Zia administration and called for support for restoring democracy. On television interviews with news channels, Khan strongly defended his letter as according to him, "nowhere in the letter had he asked for the military to take over", and he had written it in response to a news story he read in which an Army Major had shot a civilian showing him the "V sign".

In 1983, Khan went on to join the left-wing alliance, the Movement for Restoration of Democracy (MRD) led by Benazir Bhutto, supported by the communist parties at that time.

Khan was kept under house arrest at his Abbottabad residence from 16 October 1979 to 2 October 1984 and was named a prisoner of conscience by Amnesty International. In 1986, Khan left the MRD, which was under the influence of the Pakistan Peoples Party (PPP) and Awami National Party (ANP), and had paving a way for the Bhuttoism which had irked Khan. His decision of boycotting the non-partisan 1985 Pakistani general election eventually led to many of his party's key member defecting to the Pakistan Muslim League led by its President M. K. Junejo.

In 1988, his letter calling for support for martial law became a public matter Khan and failed to defend his multiple constituencies against the PPP's politicians when the 1988 Pakistani general elections were held. He also lost the 1988 general elections and leveled accusations on the military of financing (Mehrangate) the conservative Pakistan Muslim League (N) (PML(N)) and PPP. He eventually took his case to the Supreme Court of Pakistan where the hearings of his case are still being heard by the Nisar Court of present. In 1997, Khan boycotted the 1997 Pakistani general elections.

=== Public disapproval and merging with Pakistan Tehreek-e-Insaf ===
Since 1990, Khan's political image had failed to sustain any political influence in Pakistan. In 1998–99, Asghar Khan made unsuccessful attempts to merge his party's cause to Imran Khan's PTI.

In 2002, he handed over his party to his elder son, Omar Asghar Khan, who was a cabinet minister in the early Musharraf administration. After his son's mysterious death in 2002, Khan joined the National Democratic Party in 2004, which he remained part of until 2011. On 12 December 2011, Asghar Khan announced his full support of the Pakistan Tehreek-e-Insaf (PTI) and Imran Khan. He praised Imran Khan for his struggle and endorsed him as the only hope left for the survival of Pakistan. This endorsement came at a crucial time for Imran Khan, when many tainted politicians were joining his party.

== See also ==
- Politics of Pakistan
- History of Pakistan
