= United Democratic Front (Pakistan) =

United Democratic Front (Urdu: قومی متحدہ محاذ) was formed in Pakistan on 28 February 1973 in opposition to ruling Pakistan Peoples Party of Prime Minister Zulfikar Ali Bhutto. This was a coalition of eight opposition parties in the National Assembly and Senate comprising National Awami Party (NAP), United Pakistan Muslim League (PML under the leadership of spiritual leader of Hur Jamaat, Pir Pagaro), Jamiat Ulema-i-Pakistan (JUP), Jamiat Ulema-i-Islam (JUI), Jamaat-i-Islami (JI), Pakistan Democratic Party (PDP), Khaksar Tehrik and Independent Group.

== See also ==
- Pakistan National Alliance
