= 1959 Canberra shootdown =

Indo-Pakistani conflict aircraft shootdown

- Part of Indo-Pakistani wars and conflicts
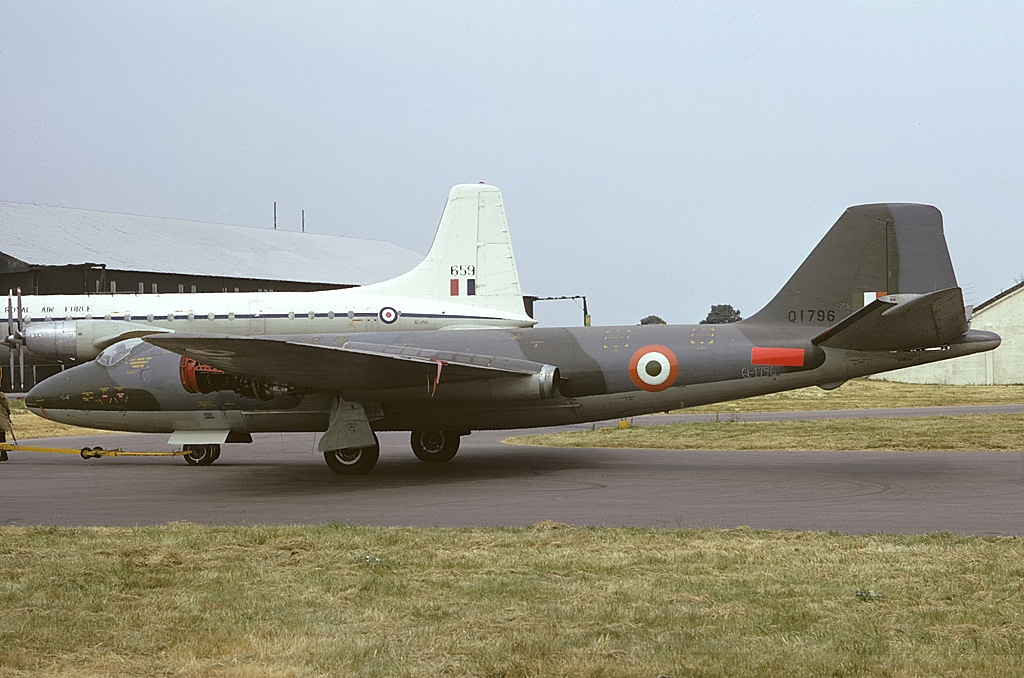
- An Indian Air Force Canberra
Date	10 April 1959
Location	Rawat, Punjab, Pakistan
Result	PAF intercepted and shot down Indian aerial reconnaissance plane; First aerial kill of the Pakistan Air Force

Belligerents
Indian Air Force	Pakistan Air Force

Commanders and leaders
AM Subroto Mukerjee; Sqn. Ldr. J.C. Sengupta; Flt. Lt. S.N. Rampal	AM Asghar Khan; Flt. Lt. M. N. Butt; Flt. Lt. M. Yunis

Units involved
No. 106 Squadron	No. 15 Squadron

Strength
1 English Electric Canberra B(I)58	2 F-86F Sabres

Casualties and losses
1 English Electric Canberra B(I)58 shot down 2 airmen captured	None

The Canberra shootdown incident occurred on 10 April 1959, when an English Electric Canberra B(I)58 of the Indian Air Force was shot down by an F-86F Sabre of the Pakistan Air Force over Rawat, near Rawalpindi while performing an aerial reconnaissance mission. This incident is regarded as the first aerial kill of the Pakistan Air Force.

== Incident ==
Because it was Eid al-Fitr most PAF personnel had been given the day off, with only a skeleton crew, mostly comprising unmarried officers and airmen, on duty. The Indian Canberra entered Pakistani airspace while on an aerial reconnaissance mission. Pakistani radar had detected that an intruder had flown in from Indian airspace, heading towards Gujrat, Pakistan. Repeated warnings were issued to the intruder to land at Gujrat, where it was spotted. Two F-86F Sabres flown by Flt. Lt. M. N. Butt and Flt. Lt. M. Yunis were scrambled from PAF Base Peshawar to intercept it. Flt. Lt. M. N. Butt attempted to bring down the Canberra by firing his machine guns, but the Canberra was flying at an altitude of more than 50,000 feet (15,000 m), beyond the operational ceiling of the F-86F. When Yunis took over, the Canberra suddenly lost height while executing a turn over Rawalpindi. Yunis fired a burst from his guns which hit the Canberra at an altitude of 47,500 ft (14,500 m) and brought it down over Rawat. Both crew members of the IAF Canberra Sqn Ldr J.C. Sengupta, and Flt Lt S.N. Rampal ejected and were captured by Pakistani authorities. They were subsequently released and repatriated a day later after remaining in detention for some time.

== Claims ==
Pakistan claims that the mission of the Canberra was to take aerial photographs of strategic installations between Lahore and Rawalpindi and that the Canberra had been warned both by hand-signals and warning shots in front of the plane. The Foreign Office of Pakistan published a press note allegedly with a written statement of Sqn. Ldr. J.C. Sengupta, which revealed the hostile nature of his mission to graph certain military targets in Pakistan. The press note emphasized the fact that the incident took place on the Eid when the Indian Air Force expected that the Pakistani defence personnel, like the rest of the nation, would be celebrating Eid and it would consequently make their espionage mission less risky and more promising on that day.

Indian Defence Minister, V. K. Krishna Menon and Indian Ambassador to the U.S. M. C. Chagla, claim that the Canberra was on a routine operational flight to photograph Indian territory in Himachal Pradesh and Kashmir and that it must have strayed over to Pakistan due to a navigational error, which was easy to do at a height of fifty thousand feet. The claim also alleges that no warning was given before the Canberra was shot down.
