= Allan Perry-Keene =

RAF Officer and 1st Air Chief of Pakistan

Air Vice Marshal Allan Perry-Keene CB OBE
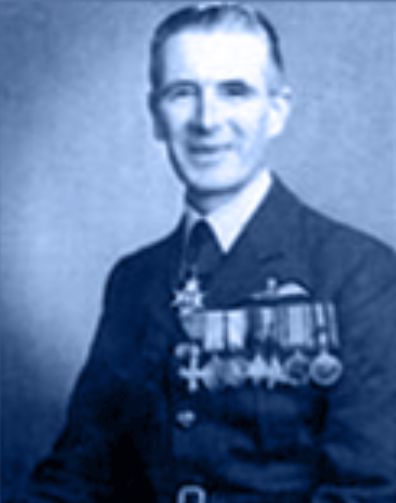
- Official portrait, c. 1947

1st Air Officer Commanding Royal Pakistan Air Force
- In office 15 August 1947 – 17 February 1949
- Preceded by: Office Established
- Succeeded by: Richard Atcherley

Air Officer-in-Charge of Administration Air Headquarters India
- In office 19 December 1946 – 14 August 1947
- Preceded by: Hugh Walmsley

Personal details
- Born: Allan Lancelot Addison Perry-Keene; 10 November 1898 Ryton, Tyne and Wear, Gateshead, England
- Died: 16 March 1987 (aged 88) Andover, Hampshire, England
- Resting place: St Peter Churchyard, St Mary Bourne, England
- Spouse: Katrine Lucy Silberrad (m. 1923; died 1986)
- Children: 2
- Education: King Edward's School, Birmingham; RAF Staff College, Andover

Military service
- Branch/service: Royal Flying Corps (1917); Royal Air Force (1918)
- Years of service: 1917–1949
- Rank: Air Vice Marshal
- Unit: Royal Norfolk Regiment (1917-18); No. 98 Squadron RAF; No. 115 Squadron RAF; No. 274 Squadron RAF; No. 207 Squadron RAF; No. 100 Squadron RAF; No. 7 Squadron RAF
- Commands: Royal Pakistan Air Force
- Battles/wars: World War I; World War II; Mohmand campaign of 1935; Indo-Pakistani war of 1947–1948
- Awards: See list
- Service number: 27474 (1917); 08036 (1918)

Allan Lancelot Addison Perry-Keene (10 November 1898 – 16 March 1987) simply known as Allan Perry-Keene or A.L.A. Perry-Keene, was a senior Royal Air Force officer who served as the first Air Officer Commanding of the Royal Pakistan Air Force from 1947 to 1949.

== Early life ==
Born on 10 November 1898, Allan was the first child of Lancelot Henry Addison Perry-Keene and Mabel. Allan had two brothers, Harry and John, and two sisters, Margaret and Eleanor; Eleanor and John were twins.

Allan received his early education in Wolverley at a local school before graduating from King Edward's School, Birmingham.

== Personal life ==
In November 1922, Allan became engaged to Katerine "Rene" Lucy Sillberrad, the only daughter of C.A. Silberrad who was in the Indian Civil Service. On 12 September 1923, he married her at the Church of St Peter ad Vincula, Combe Martin. They had two daughters.

== Service years ==
=== Royal Flying Corps ===
He enlisted in the Royal Flying Corps on 7 June 1917 and served as a pilot during World War I in France from 1918 to 1919.

=== Royal Air Force ===
He transferred to the Royal Air Force, which formed on 1 April 1918. Beginning his career as a pilot at No. 98 Sqn, followed by a stint at No. 115 Sqn in the same year. On the 12 September 1919, he received Short Service Commission and was appointed as a Flying Officer. He continued his service as a pilot, joining No. 274 Sqn on 19 November 1919, and No. 207 Squadron on the 1st of February 1920. He transitioned to become a test pilot at the Instrument Design Establishment on 20 October 1920.

On the 10th of January 1922, he took up the role of an instructor at No. 6 Flying Training School. He then became a supernumerary at the School of Technical Training (Men) on the 1st of April 1922. Returning to operational duties, he served as a pilot at No. 100 Sqn from the 9th of May 1922 until the 9th of July 1923, when he transferred to No. 7 Sqn.

The Royal Aero Club elected several new members including Perry-Keene on 20 February 1924. From 4 August 1925 to 16 February 1926, he attended the Armament Officer's Course at the Armament and Gunnery School, Eastchurch and flew in the Grosvenor Cup at Lympne on 18 September 1926.

On 1 April 1927, Flight Lieutenant Perry-Keene was appointed to RAF Practice Camp, North Coates, Fitties. On 31 October, he was appointed to RAF Depot Uxbridge and on 2 December, he was appointed to Aircraft Depot in Iraq. He attended the No. 11th course at the RAF Staff College, Andover on 23 January 1933.

On 23 January 1942, he was first appointed Senior Air Staff Officer at No. 221 Group Headquarters in Burma and then to Air Headquarters, Bengal on 20 April 1942.

He succeeded Hugh Walmsley as Air Officer-in-Charge of Administration at Air Headquarters India on 29 November 1946 or 19 December 1946.

=== Royal Pakistan Air Force ===
Air Vice Marshal Perry-Keene was appointed after correspondence between Jinnah and Louis Mountbatten, after Mountbatten, Hugh Walmsley, and Field Marshal Auchinleck agreed that he was the best candidate for the position.

== Later life and death ==
In his later years, Perry-Keene wrote an autobiography titled Reflected Glory – An Autobiography, privately published in 1978.

Allan died on 16 March 1987, at the age of 88.

== Publications ==
Flight-Lieutenant A.L.A. Perry-Keene (January 1932). THE R.A.F. IS NOT ALL WORK. Vol. 3. Gale & Polden, Royal Air Force Quarterly. p. 476-481.

=== Radio broadcast ===
Group Captain A.L.A. Perry-Keene (1941). Non-operational Flying. Indian Information.

== Awards and decorations ==
- Officer of the Order of the British Empire (1940)
- Mentioned in Despatches (1943)
- Companion of the Order of the Bath (1947)

== Dates of rank ==
Insignia	Rank	Date
	Air Vice Marshal	29 November 1946
	Air Commodore	1 June 1943 (temporary); 1 October 1946
	Group Captain	1 September 1940 (temporary); 23 July 1942 (War substantive); 1 December 1943
	Wing Commander	1 October 1937
	Squadron Leader	1 February 1934
	Flight Lieutenant	1 January 1924
	Flying Officer	1 August 1919
	Lieutenant	1 April 1918
	Second Lieutenant	7 June 1917 (temporary); 14 January 1918 (temporary)

Military offices
Preceded by RPAF established	AOC of the RPAF; 1947–1949	Succeeded by Richard Atcherley
