= Pakistan National Alliance =

Pakistan National Alliance پاکستان قومی اتحاد
- Presidium: Abul A'la Maududi (JI); Shah Ahmad Noorani (JuP); Chaudhry Zahoor Elahi (PML); Asghar Khan (TeI)
- Founded: 5 January 1977; 49 years ago
- Dissolved: 24 January 1978
- Ideology: Conservatism; Capitalism
- Political position: Right-wing
- Colors: Green
- Slogan: Nizam-e-Mustafa (1977)

Party flag

The Pakistan National Alliance (Urdu: پاکستان قومی اتحاد, Acronym: PNA) was a populist and consolidated right and left political alliance, consisting of nine political parties of the country. Formed in 1977, the country's leading right-wing parties agreed upon to run a political campaign as a single bloc against the left-wing socialist Pakistan People's Party (PPP) of Zulfikar Ali Bhutto in the 1977 general elections.

Despite each parties standing with a different ideology, PNA was noted for its large physical momentum and its right-wing orientation, originally aimed to oppose Prime Minister Zulfikar Ali Bhutto and the PPP. Despite its right-wing populist agenda, the alliance performed poorly in the 1977 general election and levelled accusations of rigging the elections. After months of spontaneous violent political activism, the martial law came in effect under chief of army staff General Zia-ul-Haq who made call for a political retribution. By 1978, the alliance met its end when parties diverged in each of its agenda. The left-wing parties later would form the MRD alliance under PPP to oppose President Zia-ul-Haq in the 1980s and the right-wing forming the IDA alliance under PML.

== History ==
The PPP came in power politics after the loss of East Pakistan in 1971. After uplifting the martial law in 1972 and promulgating the constitution in 1973, the PPP made slow efforts to advance the "Islam and democracy" in the country, but intensified the socialism with a vengeance. First and foremost, the nationalisation program was carried out to centralise the large-scale industries, private-sector and commercial corporation to set up the strong state sector. Resentment and heavy disapproval came from the elite corporate sector and PPP intensified its public programs at the social circles. Although the general elections were to be held on half of 1977, Bhutto made a move and called for holding the general elections on 7 January 1977.

Early calls for the elections were intended to not give the opposition enough time to make decisions and arrangements for the forthcoming elections. Immediately after the announcement, Bhutto started his election campaign and began allotting party tickets to party's candidates. Sensing the difficulty of facing PPP alone, the conservative mass began to consolidate when JeI contacting the Pakistan Muslim League (PML) and TeI. The other small parties too joined the alliance and initially called for ending the era of stagflation in the country and its manifesto was to bring back the 1970 prices.

On social views, the implementation of Islam was its primary election slogan. They promised to enforce Islamic laws "Nizam-e-Mustafa" and the Sharia laws. The PNA's parties were a conglomerate of diverse views and of contradictory causes and united by common dislike of PPP's autocratic policies:

PNA Divergence
Political parties	Presiding leadership	Position	Color	Fate
Jamaat-e-Islami (JeI)	Abul A'la Maududi; Mian Muhammad Tufail	Right-wing		In alliance with Zia
Pakistan Muslim League (PML)	Nawaz Sharif; Chaudhry Zahoor Elahi; Pir Pagara	Centre-right		In alliance with Zia
Tehrik-e-Istiqlal (TeI)	Asghar Khan	Right-wing		In opposition to Zia
Jamiat Ulema-e-Pakistan (JUeP)	Shah Ahmad Noorani	Right-wing		In alliance with Zia
Pakhtunkhwa Milli Awami Party (MAP)	Mahmood Khan Achakzai	Left-wing		In alliance with Zia
Balochistan National Party (BNP)	Akbar Bugti	Left-wing		Neutrality with Zia
Awami National Party (ANP)	Khan Abdul Wali Khan	Left-wing		In opposition to Zia
Pakistan Democratic Party (PDP)	Nawabzada Nasrullah Khan	Centre-right		In alliance with Zia
Jamiat Ulema e Islam
Khaaksaar Tehrik
All Jammu and Kashmir Muslim Conference				

=== Right-wing populism and violence ===
At this platform, the modern European style-influenced forces formed an alliance with totally opposite of hard-line Islamist forces. The alliance decided to contest the elections under one election symbol "plough" and a green flag with nine stars as its ensign.

Each star represented the parties under this alliance. There were nine parties, therefore flag's star represented the nine stars.

Contesting the 1977 elections jointly the PNA launched a national campaign against the government after the controversial and allegedly rigged results showing the Peoples Party as an overwhelming victory in the general elections. The agitation caught the Peoples Party and its political scientists, by surprise and after several months of street fighting and demonstrations. Under advised by his advisers, Bhutto opened negotiations with the then PNA leadership but whether or not it would have been signed by all PNA parties or by Bhutto remains open to speculation. In a single unusual anti-Bhutto bloc, the alliance seemed to be effective when tapping a wave to remove Bhutto from government.

=== Authoritarianism and PNA split ===
The conservatives and Islamist fronts went to General Zia-ul-Haq, Chief of Army Staff and Admiral Mohammad Shariff, Chairman of the Joint Chiefs of Staff Committee, and convinced them to remove Bhutto and no other agreement is reached with Bhutto and his colleagues remained stubborn. The absence of a formal agreement between the government and the PNA was used as an excuse by the Pakistan Defence Forces under its chairman Admiral Mohammad Shariff which led to stage a Coup d'état (see Operation Fair Play) by General Zia-ul-Haq to break the impasse. Those justifying the coup, argue that no agreement had been reached between the two sides.

=== Controversy regarding foreign support ===
On 5 July 1977, the PPP accused the United States of plotting the coup and maintained that the coup had tacit consent from the United States. A few before the martial law, Bhutto had indicated that few foreign powers had been engineering his downfall, though he did not name which foreign powers. Several Pakistani scholars and researchers have given credence to Bhutto's claim. The veracity of these claims are difficult to verify since the United States has strongly rejected any claims of their involvement in downfall of Bhutto. Though, former American Attorney General Ramsey Clark did questioned the "knowledge, hence the tacit approval" of the coup staged against the PPP.

In 1998, Benazir Bhutto publicly announced her belief that her father was "sent to the gallows at the instance of the superpower (most believe it to be USA) for pursuing the nuclear capability, though she did not disclosed the name of the foreign power.

== Alliance members ==
The Alliance unusually consisted of 9 main parties, with completely different ideologies, backgrounds, and political goals who opposed Bhutto and his government: All nine together made the Pakistan National Alliance.

1. Tehrik e Istaqlal (TI)
2. Jamaat e Islami Pakistan (JIP)
3. Jamiat Ulema e Islam (JUI)
4. Jamiat Ulema e Pakistan (JUP)
5. Pakistan Muslim League (PML)
6. National Democratic Party (NDP)
7. Pakistan Democratic Party (PDP)
8. Khaaksaar Tehrik (KT)
9. All Jammu and Kashmir Muslim Conference (AKMC)

== See also ==
- Islami Jamhoori Ittehad
- Politics of Pakistan
- History of Pakistan
- List of political parties in Pakistan
- Movement for Restoration of Democracy - a nine-party alliance formed to oppose Zia-ul-Haq
