= 1977 Pakistani general election =

- 7 March 1977

200 of the 216 seats in the National Assembly 101 seats needed for a majority
- Registered: 30,899,052
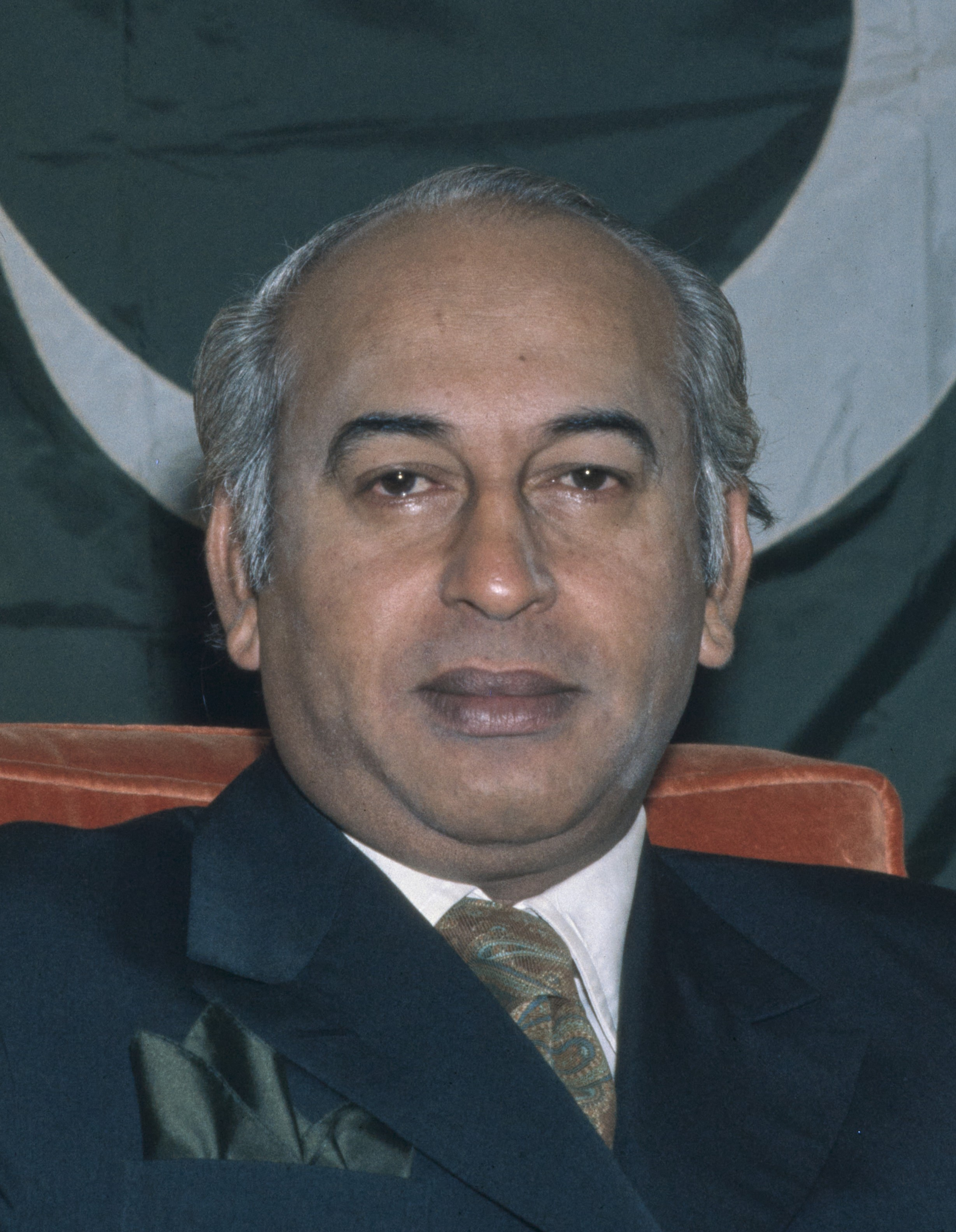

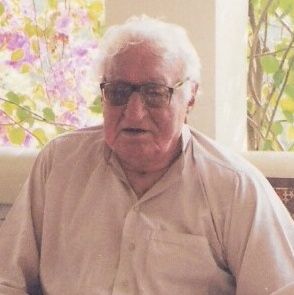
	First party	Second party
Leader	Zulfikar Ali Bhutto	Abdul Wali Khan
Party	PPP	PNA
Last election	86	–
Seats won	155	36
Seat change	▲74	New
Popular vote	10,093,868	6,154,921
Percentage	59.74%	36.43%
Swing	▲41.11pp	New
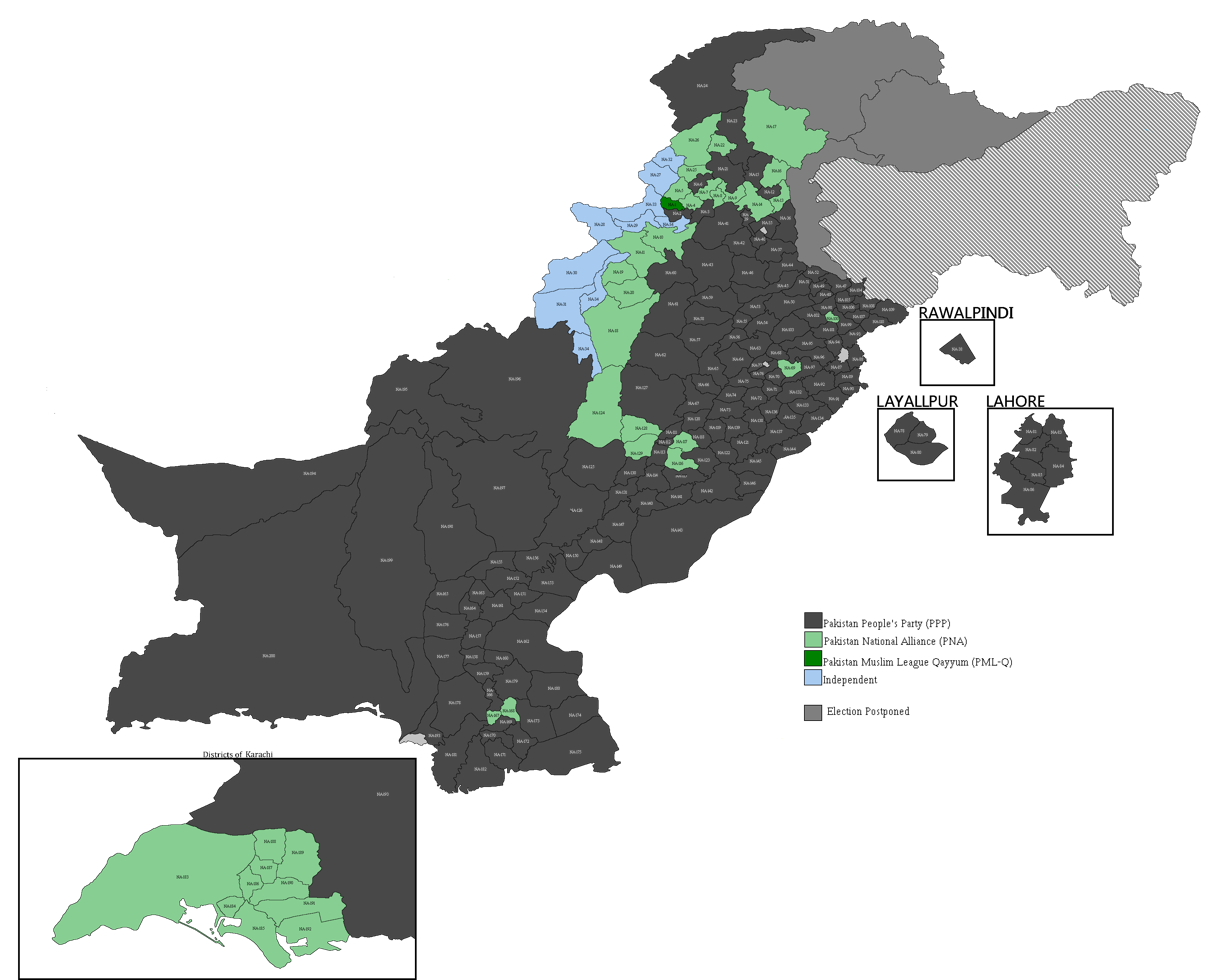
- Results by constituency
Prime Minister before election
Zulfikar Ali Bhutto
PPP
Elected Prime Minister
Zulfikar Ali Bhutto
PPP

General elections were held in Pakistan on 7 March 1977 to elect 200 members of the National Assembly. They were the second general elections held in Pakistan and the first to be held after the Bangladesh Liberation War.

Although the elections were initially scheduled to be held in the second half of 1977 after the completion of the National Assembly's parliamentary term, the Pakistan People's Party (PPP) government led by Zulfikar Ali Bhutto decided to hold the elections earlier. As the majority of general public had a favourable opinion of Bhutto government, it was widely anticipated that the PPP would be re-elected. In response, nine opposition parties united together to form the Pakistan National Alliance (PNA). The PNA ran on a right-wing platform, opposing the PPP's left-wing stance. However, the PNA also consisted of some left-wing parties that opposed Bhutto, including the National Awami Party of Khan Abdul Wali Khan, who was also regarded as the leader of the PNA.

The result was a landslide victory for the PPP, which won 155 seats. Meanwhile, the PNA won only 36 seats; the Pakistan Muslim League (Qayyum) was the only other party to win a seat. The PPP's victory meant Bhutto would continue as Prime Minister. However, the PNA accused the PPP of rigging the elections, and refused to accept the result. Although allegations of rigging were denied by PPP, the claims made by PNA sparked unrest that resulted in mass demonstrations and violent anti-Bhutto protests. Bhutto and the security forces were unable to control the situation. The Chief of Army Staff Muhammad Zia-ul-Haq subsequently called a secret meeting of senior military officials to plan a coup, which was successfully executed, resulting in the overthrow of government and dissolution of the National Assembly. Subsequently, Pakistan entered its third period of military rule.

== Campaign ==
The elections were held earlier than originally planned, and were expected to be held in the second half of 1977. However, on 7 January 1977, Bhutto appeared on national television, announcing the elections would be held earlier, and started his political campaign shortly after appearing on national television. On 10 January, Election Commissioner of Pakistan Justice Sajjad Ahmad Jan announced the election schedule and declared 19 and 22 January as the last date for receipt of nominations for the Parliament and Provincial Assemblies, respectively.

Bhutto responded aggressively, immediately issuing party tickets to his workers. Unlike the 1970 elections, when Pakistan Peoples Party mainly banked on socialist slogans, this time Bhutto also relied on political heavyweights, issuing tickets to feudal lords and other influential members. Bhutto himself held public meetings all over the country, and to get further support from the common man, he announced labour reforms on 4 January, and on 5 January, a second set of land reforms. The attendance in the public meetings was amazing in all parts of the country, especially in interior Sindh and Punjab. Bhutto's motives for holding elections earlier was that not to give sufficient time to the opposition to make decisions and arrangements for the forthcoming elections.

The PNA had become a big problem for Pakistan Peoples Party that was targeting Peoples Party on a number of occasions. Throughout the elections, the PNA failed to justify their plans for the country but instead targeted the Peoples' Party, concentrating on misdeed, alleged corruptions (although there were no evidences that linked to Bhutto), financial mismanagement, heavy expenditures on administration and disastrous economic policies evidenced by inflation.

== Electoral preparations ==
The Election Commission entered the registry of 30,899,052 voters, commissioned two hundred and fifty five Returning officers (RO) to manage voting system of the polling offices established in entire country.

== Results ==
On 7 March 1977 the Election Commission announced the result in which Pakistan Peoples Party won the largest landslide victory in Pakistan's electoral history, winning 155 out of 200 seats in the Parliament. The Pakistan National Alliance (PNA) secured only 36 seats and eight seats on each of province's legislative assemblies, but the PNA had not contested all the seats, with some parties boycotting elections in parts of the country. The PNA failed to secure any seats from industrial cities such as Lahore. In Karachi, 80% of seats were secured. A similar outcome was seen in Rawalpindi, where the PNA had arranged a massive demonstration and big public gatherings and processions. These results were in stark contrast to the widespread predictions that although Bhutto would win the election, but not by a wide margin that the results suggested.

Overall, the PPP won 59.74% of the votes and a supermajority in the parliament. In numerous constituencies in Punjab, where Bhutto faced the strongest opposition, Bhutto's candidates returned with over 95% of the vote. Observers noticed that in polling offices where PNA's candidates were strong, the polling was alleged to have been blocked for hours. Observers, both national and international, quickly pointed out that the results in key constituencies were issued directly from the Prime Minister's office.

Party	Votes	%	Seats				
Party	Votes	%	General	Women	Minority	Total	+/–
Pakistan Peoples Party	10,093,868	59.74	155	10	6	171	+85
Pakistan National Alliance	6,154,921	36.43	36	0	0	36	+24
Pakistan Muslim League (Qayyum)	157,370	0.93	1	0	0	1	–8
Pakistan Pakhtunkhwa National Awami Party	48,145	0.28	0	0	0	0	New
Jamiat Ulema-e-Islam (Hazarvi)	7,595	0.04	0	0	0	0	New
Pakistan Inqlabi Mahaz	6,494	0.04	0	0	0	0	New
Tahafuz-e-Islam	5,206	0.03	0	0	0	0	New
Pakistan Worker's Party	1,716	0.01	0	0	0	0	New
Pakistan Socialist Party	1,060	0.01	0	0	0	0	New
Jammaat-e-Aalia Mujahideen	808	0.00	0	0	0	0	New
Independents	417,808	2.47	8	0	0	8	–8
Total	16,894,991	100.00	200	10	6	216	–97
Registered voters/turnout	30,899,052	–					
Source: Gallup Pakistan, FAFEN, The News

== Aftermath ==
When the results were announced, a great ire on Bhutto was raised by Alliance's leader Abdul Vali Khan, accusing Bhutto for systematically rigging the elections. The Alliance boycotted the assemblies sessions, staging massive demonstration in the country. Vali Khan demanded immediate resignation of Bhutto, chief election commissioner, and as well as the government, proposing the idea of holding new elections under the supervision of Supreme Court of Pakistan. Bhutto refused the demands, Vali Khan and the Alliance decided to bring their party workers onto the streets, to break law deliberately, and to confront the police and the Federal Security Force, Bhutto's commissioned security forces. Alliance leaders called upon the people to stage countrywide strikes and organise protest marches. The followers fully responded to the call and a full-fledged political movement started, during this episode, the business community wholeheartedly joined Alliance. The Alliance used mosques and churches to stimulate the masses and tried to create an impression that they were only working for the enforcement of Nizam-i-Mustafa. They criticised the socialistic attitude of Bhutto and alleged that he had lost his faith in Islam. The ulema whipped up emotions for a jihad to save Islam, which they thought was in danger from an evil regime. The bar associations across the country also began to register their strong protest against the electoral fraud and denounced the post-election policy of repression. The law and order situation created by rioting by the PNA cost the economy $765 million and exports fell by 35%.

Bhutto used repression to curb the Alliance but soon came to conclusion that it was not possible. Therefore, Bhutto tried to use the option of dialogue by holding talks with the Alliance leaders. The Alliance demanded the 50% representation in the government, release of their party workers and leaders, and demanded new elections before 14 August. On 3 July 1977, then-director general of Military Intelligence Major-General Khalid Mahmud Arif revealed the military's plot to overthrow Bhutto, urging Bhutto to "rush the negotiations before its too late". The next day, Bhutto accepted all demands of Alliance and the stage was set for a compromise. Bhutto immediately travelled to Saudi Arabia and United Arab Emirates, further putting the negotiations behind and the Alliance termed his tour as "dilatory tactics". On 5 July, Chief of Army Staff General Muhammad Zia-ul-Haq, supported by Chief of Naval Staff Admiral Mohammad Shariff, imposed martial law and sent Bhutto behind the bars. Shortly, General Zia announced: "Had an agreement reached between the opposition and the Government, I would certainly never have done what I did...". Although his statement was dismissed by General Khalid Mahmud Arif in 1979.. The second explanation in existence, supported by the PPP and anti Zia or intervention, cite the coup was done because the agreement was made between Government of PPP and Opposition PNA, in the night of coup and Bhutto was to announce it in morning, Though its contentious among the anti Bhutto critics.
