= List of research institutes in Pakistan =

The following is a partial list of research institutes in Pakistan.

- Abdus Salam School of Mathematical Sciences, GC University Lahore
- Azra Naheed Center for Research and Development, Superior University Lahore
- Atta-Ur-Rahman School of Applied Biosciences, National University of Sciences and Technology (Pakistan), Islamabad
- Al-Khawarizmi Institute of Computer Science, UET, Lahore
- Applied Economic Research Center
- Applied Economics Research Centre
- Area Study Center for Europe, University of Karachi
- Baba Fareed Islamic Research Centre (BFIRC), University of Lahore, Pakpattan
- Central Cotton Research Institute, Nawabshah
- Bilawal Institute of Historical Research (BIHR), Nawabshah
- Civil Aviation Training Institute
- Centre for Research in Molecular Medicine (CRIMM), University of Lahore
- FAST-NUCES, Islamabad.
- Hydrocarbon Development Institute of Pakistan
- Institute of Policy Studies (IPS)
- Institute of Regional Studies, Islamabad (IRS)
- Institute of Social and Policy Sciences (I-SAPS)
- International Center for Chemical and Biological Sciences
- The Institute of Strategic Studies, Islamabad (ISSI)
- Institute Of Cost And Management Accountants Of Pakistan
- Islamabad Policy Research Institute (IPRI)
- Lahore University of Management Sciences (LUMS)
- Marine Fisheries Department
- National Centre for Physics
- National Fertilizer Development Centre (NFDC)
- National Institute for Biotechnology and Genetic Engineering (NIBGE), Faislabad
- National Institute of Electronics
- National Institute of Oceanography
- Pakistan Administrative Staff College, Lahore
- Pakistan Agricultural Research Council, Islamabad
- Pakistan Bureau of Statistics
- Pakistan Institute of Development Economics (PIDE)
- Pakistan Institute of Engineering and Applied Sciences (PIEAS)
- Pakistan Institute of International Affairs, Karachi
- Pakistan Institute of Labour Education and Research (PILER)
- Pakistan Marine Academy
- Petroleum Institute of Pakistan
- Radiology Research Section (RRS), University of Lahore
- Social Policy and Development Centre (SPDC)
- Station for Ostrich Research and Development [SORD], Department of Poultry Science PMAS Arid Agriculture University, Rawalpindi Pakistan
- University College of Engineering & Technology, The Islamia University of Bahawalpur
- Lahore School of Economics (LSE)
- School of Interdisciplinary Engineering & Sciences, National University of Sciences & Technology
- Institute of Advanced Research Studies in Chemical Sciences, University of Sindh, Jamshoro https://sindhhec.gov.pk/wp-content/uploads/2025/04/Annexure-II-National-Postdoc-1.pdf
