= List of people from Abbottabad =

This is the list of notable people who were born, lived or grew up in Abbottabad.

== Politicians ==
- Rajab Ali Khan Abbasi
- Ahmad Nawaz Khan Jadoon
- Malik Abdul Rauf
- Ali Khan Jadoon
- Jalal Baba
- Abdul Jamil Khan
- Azam Khan Swati
- Farooq Haider Khan
- Haider Zaman Khan
- Javed Iqbal Abbasi
- Muhammad Azhar Jadoon
- Mushtaq Ahmed Ghani
- Murtaza Javed Abbasi
- Nazir Ahmed Abbasi
- Raja Sikander Zaman
- Sabrina Singh

== Sports ==
=== Cricket ===
- Yasir Hameed
- Mohammad Naeem
- Fawad Ahmed
- Fawad Khan (cricketer)
- Junaid Khan (cricketer)

== Media and Entertainment ==
- Afzal Khan (actor)
- Manoj Kumar
- Nimmi
