= NA-12 (Abbottabad) =

Constituency of the National Assembly of Pakistan

NA-12 Abbottabad
- Former constituency for the National Assembly of Pakistan

Former constituency
- Created: 1977
- Abolished: 2018
- Replaced by: NA-15 (Abbottabad-I), NA-16 (Abbottabad-II)

NA-12 (Abbottabad) was a constituency for the National Assembly of Pakistan. The constituency was established in 1977. The name changed to NA-18 (Abbottabad-II) in 2002 and later replaced by NA-15 (Abbottabad-I) and NA-16 (Abbottabad-II) during the 2018 delimitation.

Muhammad Iqbal Khan Jadoon was elected MNA in the 1977 general election.

Javed Iqbal Abbasi was one of the senators for this constituency.
