= AERC =

AERC may refer to:

- Association of European Rarities Committees
- Applied Economics Research Centre, of the University of Karachi
