= Ali Asghar Khan (Pakistani politician) =

Pakistani architect and politician

- علی اصغر خان
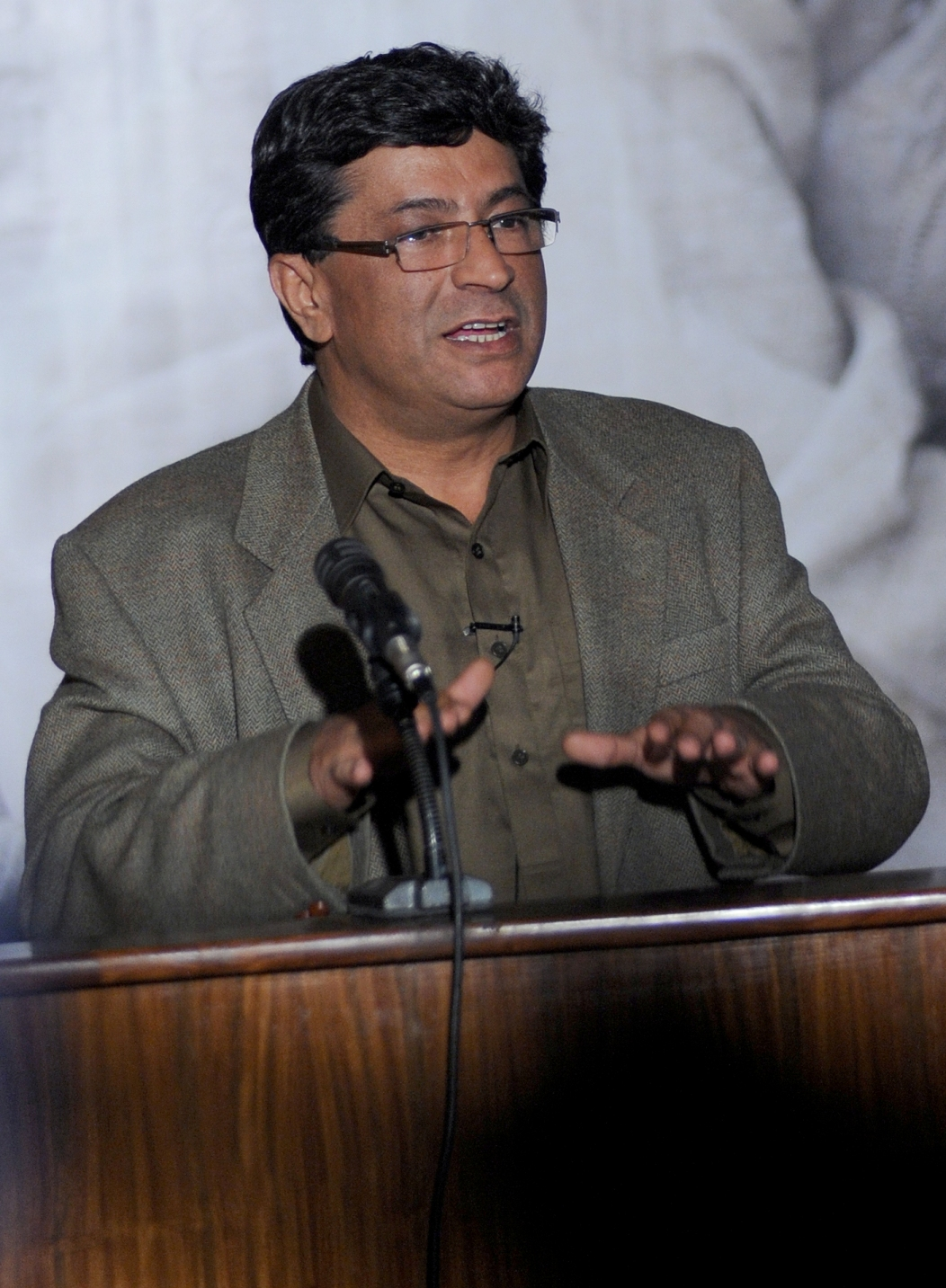
- Ali in 2012

Member of the National Assembly of Pakistan
- Incumbent
- Assumed office 29 February 2024
- Constituency: NA-16 Abbottabad-I

Executive Director Omar Asghar Khan Development Foundation
- Incumbent
- Assumed office March 2003

Founding Partner Design Group Practice
- Incumbent
- Assumed office January 1990

Personal details
- Born: Abbottabad, Khyber Pakhtunkhwa, Pakistan
- Party: PTI (2014-present)
- Spouse: Maliha Khan (m. 2015)
- Parent: Asghar Khan (father)
- Relatives: Omar Asghar Khan (brother)
- Education: Abbottabad Public School; University of Greenwich

Ali Asghar Khan (Urdu: علی اصغر خان) is a Pakistani architect and politician who is a Member of the National Assembly of Pakistan since 29 February 2024. Additionally, Ali is the Provincial General Secretary of Pakistan Tehreek-e-Insaf in Khyber Pakhtunkhwa, Associate of the Royal Institute of British Architects and founding partner of Design Group Practice in Islamabad. He is the youngest child of Air Marshal Asghar Khan.

== Early life and education ==
Ali Asghar Khan was born in 1958, into an Afridi Pashtun family and is the youngest child of Air Marshal Asghar Khan and Amina Shamsie. Ali has two older sisters, Nasreen and Shireen, and had an older brother, Omar Asghar Khan, who died mysteriously in 2002 during Musharraf's tenure. Ali attended the Abbottabad Public School from 1969 to 1974.

== Personal life ==
Ali married fellow Pakistan Tehreek-e-Insaf member Maliha Khan, of Hazara descent, in January 2015.

== Architecture career ==
After obtaining his degree in Architecture from Greenwich University, Ali was elected as a member of the Royal Institute of British Architects and began working with the Department of Architecture & Planning, London Borough of Hackney.

After a few years, Ali returned to Pakistan and joined Lari Associates in Karachi.

Ali started his own practice, Design Unit, which managed a big portfolio of diverse projects including educational institutes, residential and commercial buildings. Afterwards, in collaboration with architect Samar Ali Khan, he set up the partnership firm Design Group Practice in January 1990.

== Political career ==
Ali Asghar Khan is a senior member of the Pakistan Tehreek-e-Insaf.

He contested the 2002 Pakistani general election from NA-17 Abbottabad-I as a candidate of Qaumi Jamhoori Party, but was unsuccessful. He received 4,687 votes and was defeated Amanullah Khan Jadoon, a candidate of Pakistan Muslim League (Q) (PML(Q)).

He contested a 2014 by-election from PK-45 Abbottabad-II as a candidate of Pakistan Tehreek-e-Insaf (PTI), but was unsuccessful. He received 23,597 votes and was defeated by Sardar Muhammad Farid Khan Abbasi, a candidate of Pakistan Muslim League (N) (PML(N)).

He contested the 2018 Pakistani general election from NA-15 Abbottabad-I as a candidate of PTI, but was unsuccessful. He received 81,845 votes and was defeated by Murtaza Javed Abbasi, a candidate of PML(N).

He was elected to the National Assembly of Pakistan in the 2024 Pakistani general election from NA-16 Abbottabad-I as a PTI-backed Independent candidate. He received 105,300 votes while runner up Murtaza Javed Abbasi, a candidate of PML(N), received 86,621 votes.
