= Muhammad Azhar Jadoon =

Pakistani politician

Muhammad Azhar Khan Jadoon
- محمداظہرخان جدون

Member of the National Assembly of Pakistan
- In office 1 June 2013 – 31 May 2018
- Constituency: NA-17 (Abbottabad-I)

Personal details
- Born: 3 April 1960 (age 66)
- Party: PTI (2013-present)
- Other political affiliations: IND (2002-2013)

Muhammad Azhar Khan Jadoon (Urdu: محمد اظہر خان جدون; both 3 April 1960) is a Pakistani politician who served as a member of the National Assembly of Pakistan from June 2013 to May 2018.

== Early life ==
Jadoon was born on 3 April 1960.

== Political career ==
Jadoon ran for the seat of the National Assembly of Pakistan as an independent candidate from Constituency NA-17 (Abbottabad-I) in the 2002 Pakistani general election but was unsuccessful. He received 30,949 votes and lost the seat to Amanullah Khan Jadoon.

Jadoon ran for the seat of National Assembly as an independent candidate from Constituency NA-17 (Abbottabad-I) in the 2008 Pakistani general election but was unsuccessful. He received 36,668 votes and lost the seat to Sardar Mehtab Abbasi.

Jadoon was elected to the National Assembly as a candidate of Pakistan Tehreek-e-Insaf from Constituency NA-17 (Abbottabad-I) in the 2013 Pakistani general election. He received 96,549 votes and defeated Sardar Mehtab Abbasi.
