= NA-16 =

NA-16 may refer to:

- NA-16 (Abbottabad-II), a constituency of the National Assembly of Pakistan
- North American NA-16, first trainer aircraft built by North American Aviation
