= Ali Asghar Khan =

Ali Asghar Khan may refer to:

- Ali al-Asghar ibn Husayn (died 680), youngest son of Husayn ibn Ali (the grandson of prophet Muhammad)
- Mirza Ali Asghar Khan Amin al-Soltan (1843–1907), prime minister of Iran
- Ali Asghar Khan (Pakistani politician), Pakistani politician
