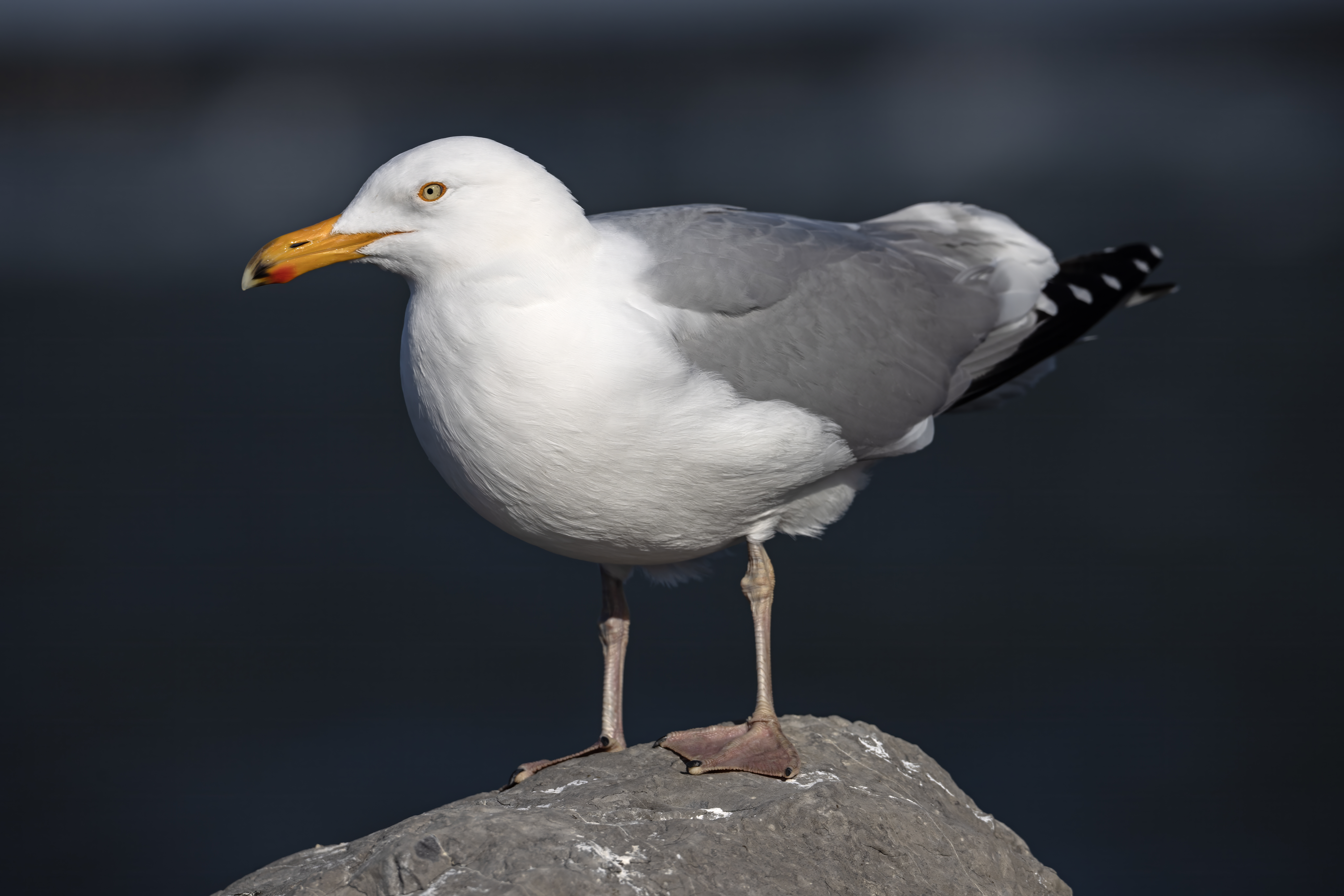
- Adult, Barnegat Inlet, New Jersey
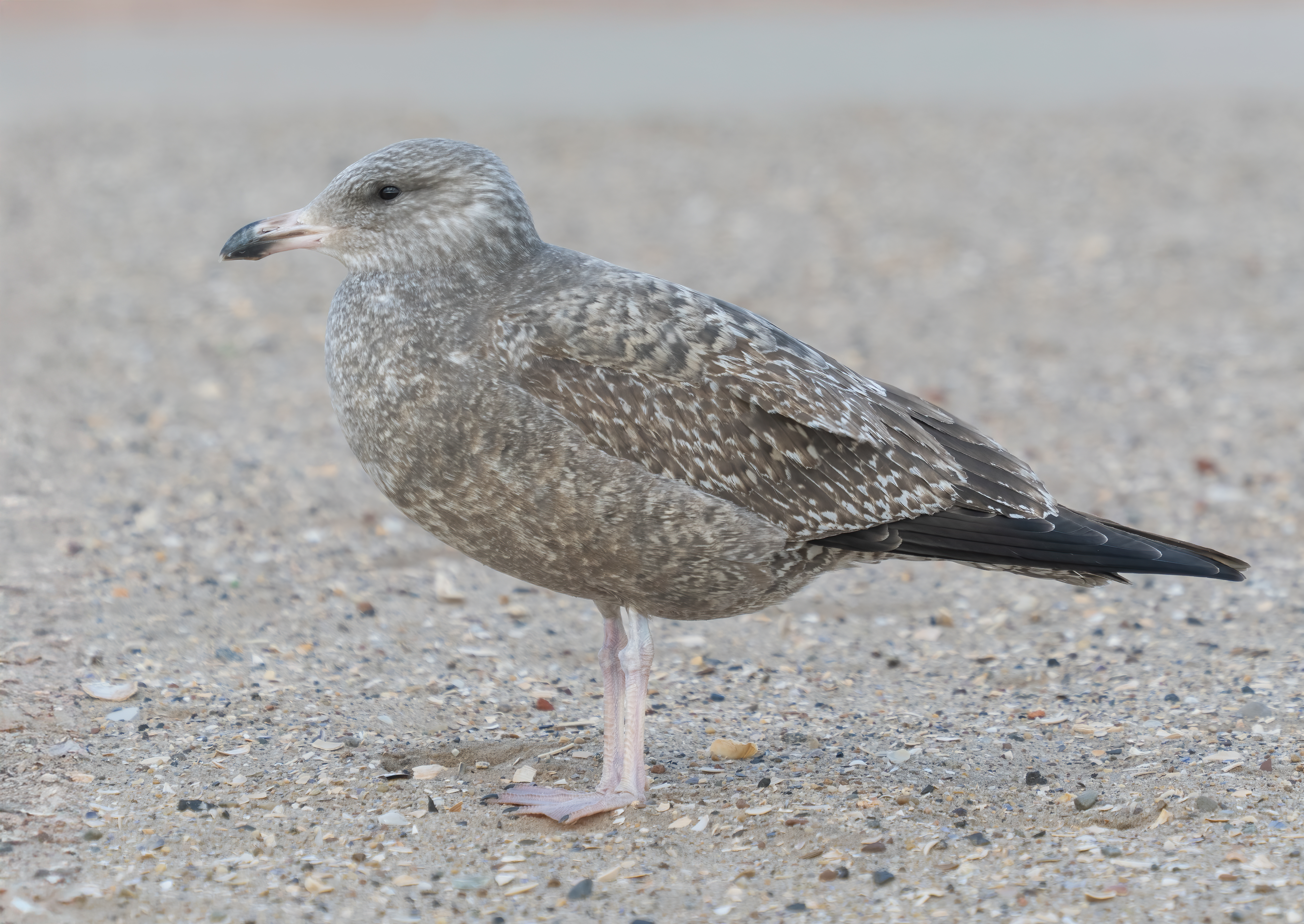
- Juvenile, Coney Island, New York

Conservation status
- Least Concern (IUCN 3.1)

Scientific classification
- Kingdom: Animalia
- Phylum: Chordata
- Class: Aves
- Order: Charadriiformes
- Family: Laridae
- Genus: Larus
- Species: L. smithsonianus

Binomial name
- Larus smithsonianus Coues, 1862

Synonyms
- Larus argentatus smithsonianus

= American herring gull =

Species of bird

The American herring gull (Larus smithsonianus or Larus argentatus smithsonianus), also known as the Arctic herring gull or Smithsonian gull, is a large gull that breeds in North America, where it is treated by the American Ornithological Society as distinct from the European herring gull (Larus argentatus).

Adults are white with gray back and wings, black wingtips with white spots, and pink legs. Immature birds are gray-brown and are darker and more uniform than European herring gulls, with a darker tail. As is common with other gulls, they are colloquially referred to simply as seagulls.

It occurs in a variety of habitats including coasts, lakes, rivers, parking lots and garbage dumps. Its broad diet includes invertebrates, fish, and many other items. It usually nests near water, laying around three eggs in a scrape on the ground.

== Taxonomy ==
This gull was first described as a new species in 1862 by Elliott Coues based on a series of specimens from the Smithsonian Institution. It was later reclassified as a subspecies of the herring gull (Larus argentatus). The genus name is from Latin Larus, which refers to a gull or other large seabird. The species name smithsonianus commemorates English chemist James Smithson whose £100,000 bequest enabled the foundation of the institution that bears his name.

The taxonomy of the herring gull group is very complicated and much is still controversial and uncertain. A 2002 study suggested that the American herring gull is not closely related to European herring gulls, belonging instead to a separate clade of gulls. Several authorities such as the Association of European Rarities Committees and British Ornithologists' Union now recognize it as a separate species. The BOU also includes the Vega gull (Larus vegae) of northeastern Asia within the American herring gull. The American Ornithologists' Union adopted the split in 2025 and now recognizes both the American herring gull and Vega gull as distinct species.

== Description ==
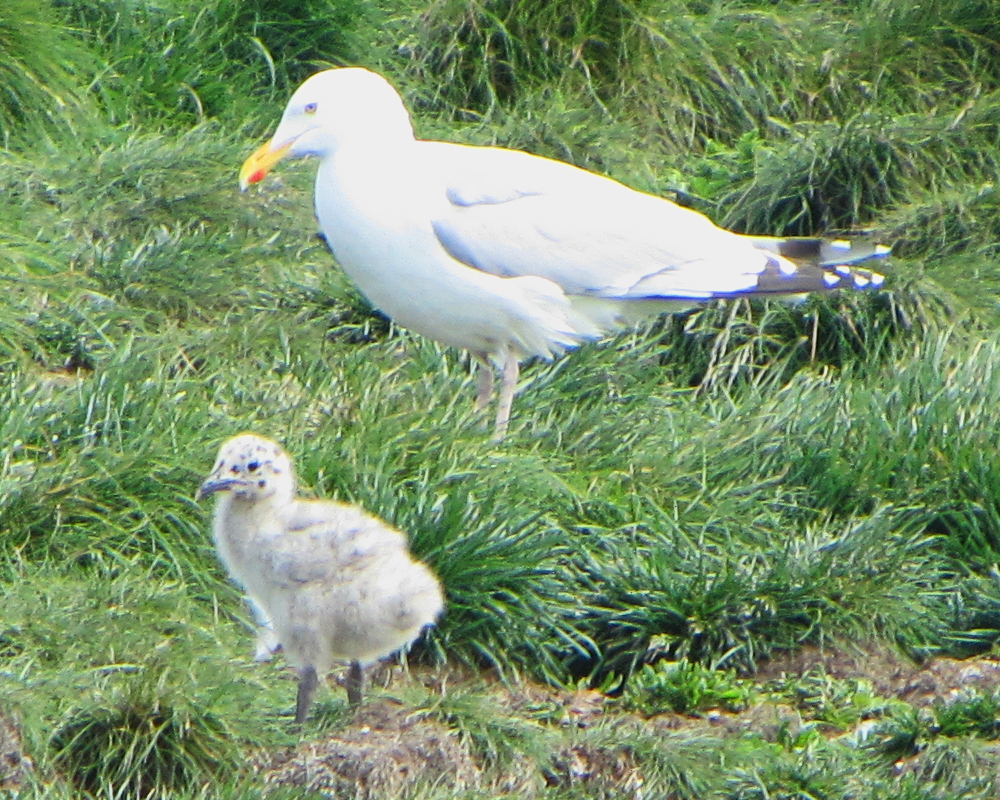
Adult with chick, Elliston, Newfoundland

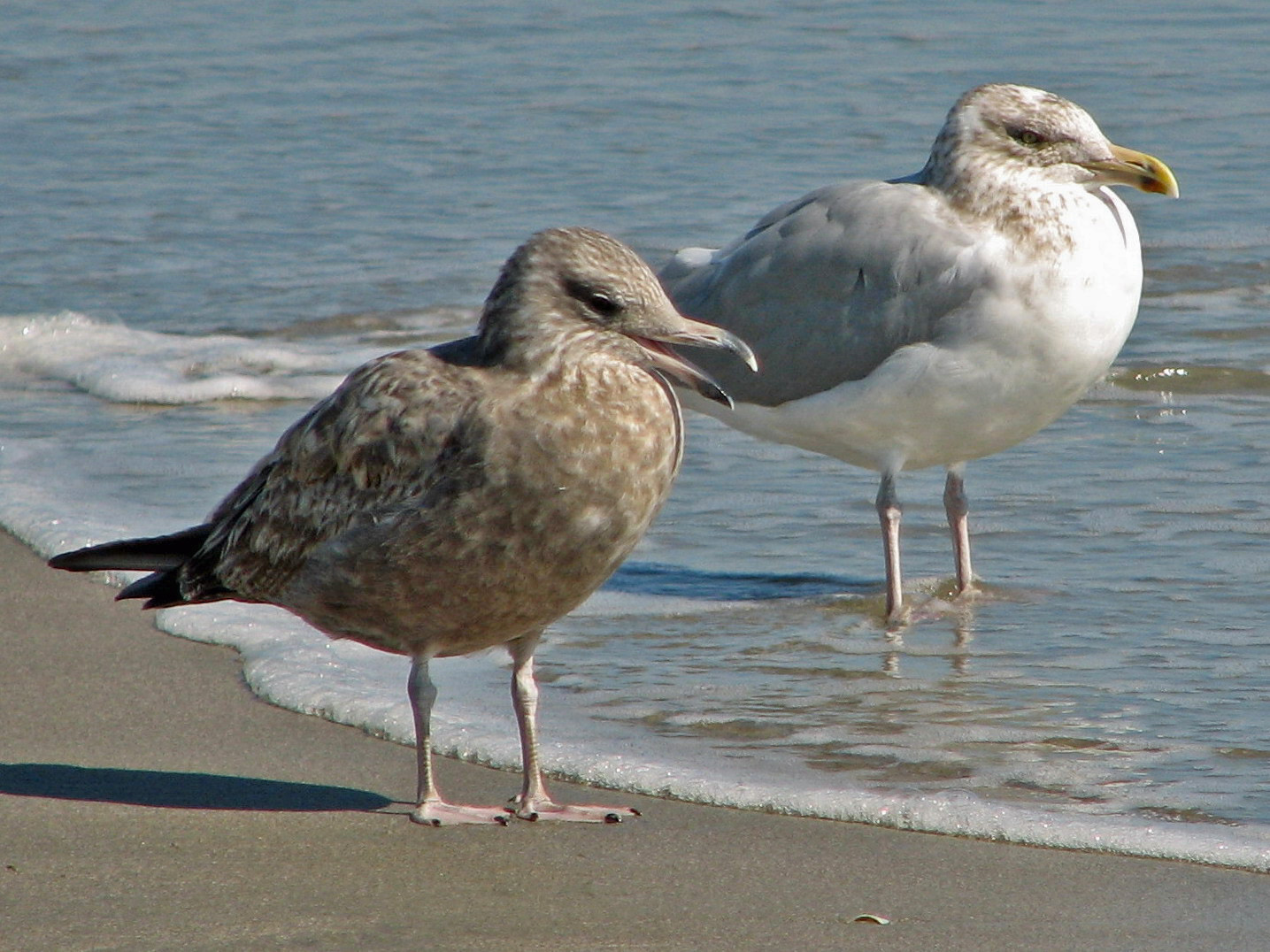
Juvenile and adult in North Carolina

The herring gull is a heavily built large gull with a long powerful bill, full chest and sloping forehead. Males are 60–66 cm (24–26 in) long and weigh 1,050–1,650 g (2.31–3.64 lb). Females are 53–62 cm (21–24 in) long and weigh 600–900 g (1.3–2.0 lb). The wingspan is 120 to 155 cm (47 to 61 in). Among standard measurements, the wing chord is 41.2 to 46.8 cm (16.2 to 18.4 in), the bill is 4.4 to 6.2 cm (1.7 to 2.4 in) and the tarsus is 5.5 to 7.6 cm (2.2 to 3.0 in).

Breeding adults have a white head, rump, tail, and underparts and a pale gray back and upperwings. The wingtips are black with white spots known as "mirrors" and the trailing edge of the wing is white. The underwing is grayish with dark tips to the outer primary feathers. The legs and feet are normally pink but can have a bluish tinge, or occasionally be yellow. The bill is yellow with a red spot on the lower mandible. The eye is bright, pale to medium yellow, with a bare yellow or orange ring around it. In winter, the head and neck are streaked with brown.

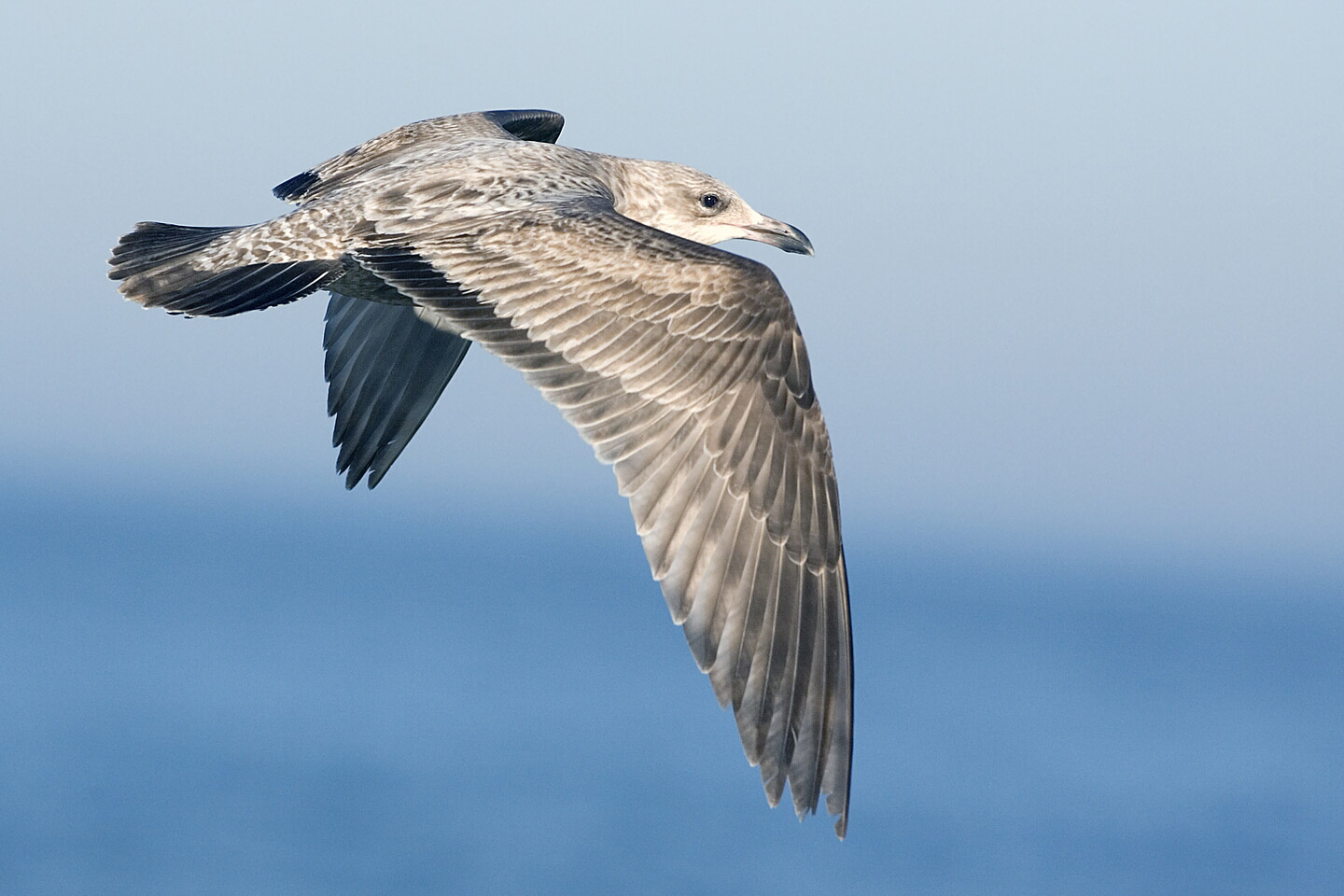
First-cycle bird in Texas

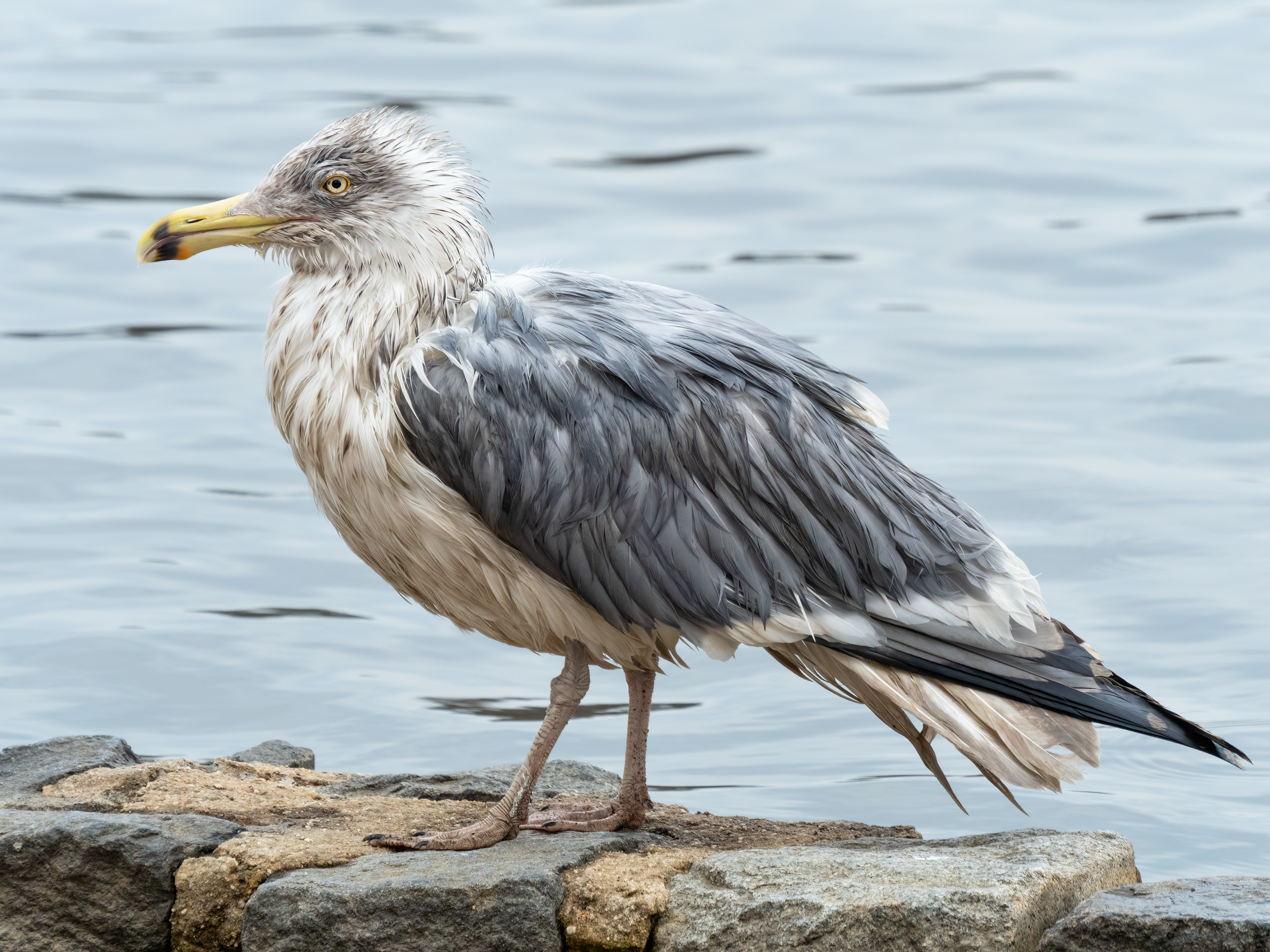
Gull that has lost feather waterproofing due to lead poisoning

Young birds take four years to reach fully adult plumage. During this time they go through several plumage stages and can be very variable in appearance. First-winter birds are gray-brown with a dark tail, a brown rump with dark bars, dark outer primaries and pale inner primaries, dark eyes, and a dark bill, which usually develops a paler base through the winter. The head is often paler than the body. Second-winter birds typically have pale eyes, pale bill with black tip, pale head, and begin to show gray feathers on the back. Third-winter birds are closer to adults but still have some black on the bill and brown on the body and wings and have a black band on the tail.

=== Voice ===
It has no song but possesses a variety of cries and calls. An initial call in response to a threat is a quick "hahaha", varying in intensity depending on the threat. The more-intense "keow" is a loud yet short alarm call that is both identifying and communicative of impending danger. The "long call" is a series of loud notes during which the head is dipped and then raised. The "choking" call is produced during courtship displays, nest construction or territorial disputes, accompanied by a rapid bobbing of the head in a direction of interest. The "mew" call is used with an extended downturned neck to call attention in many contexts including chick or mate calling and nest defense. Juvenile birds emit high-pitched plaintive cries to elicit feeding behavior from a parent and may also emit a clicking distress call when a parent suddenly flies off.

=== Similar species ===
Adult European herring gulls are very similar to American herring gulls but those of the subspecies L. a. argenteus are smaller than many American birds while those of the northern subspecies L. a. argentatus are typically darker gray above. European birds lack the long gray tongues on the 6th, 7th, and 8th primaries and solid black markings on the 5th and 6th primaries that are shown by American herring gulls. First-winter European birds have more checkered upperparts, more streaked underparts, and a paler rump and base to the tail.

== Distribution and habitat ==
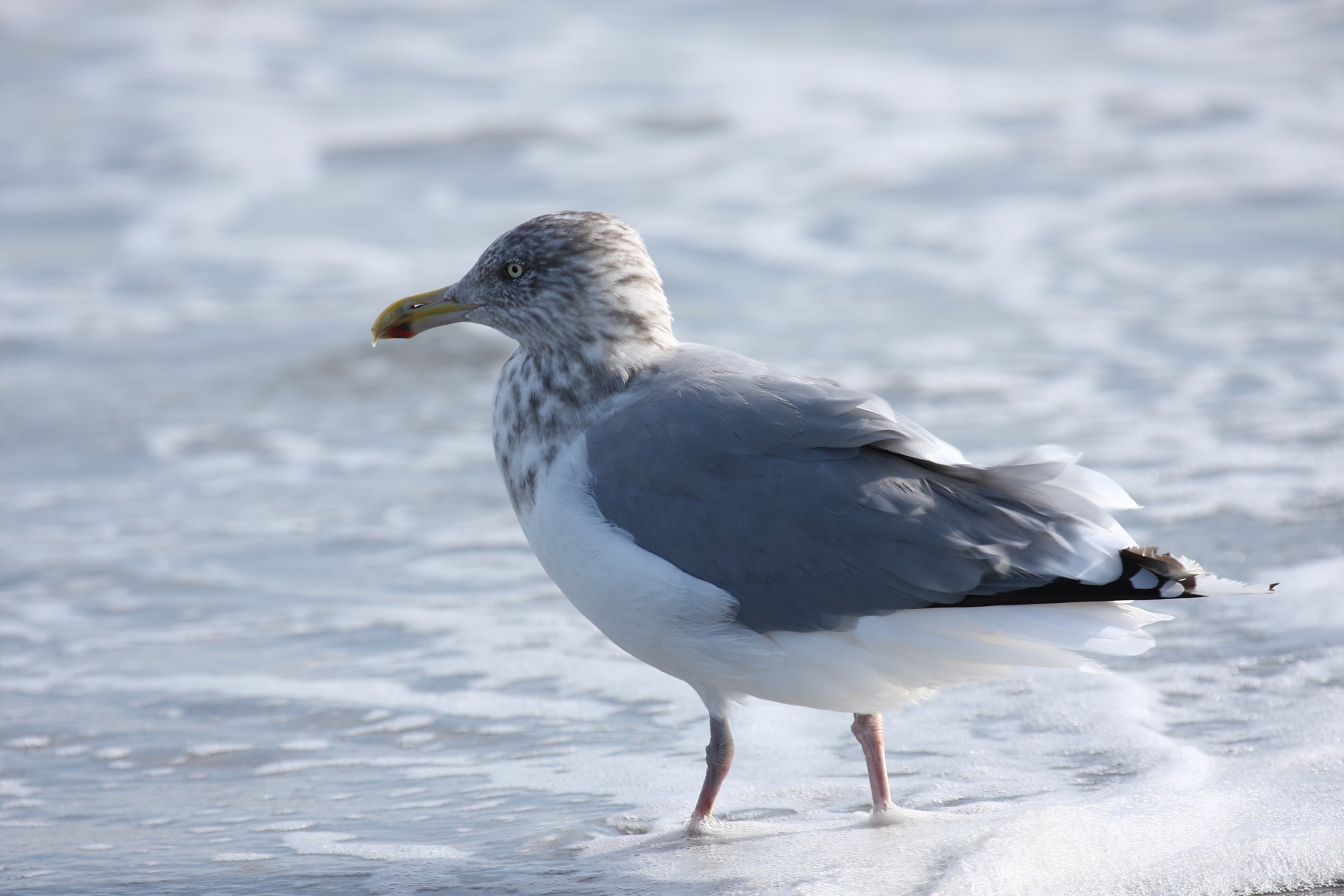
Adult in winter plumage, Cape May Point, New Jersey

The breeding range extends across the northern part of North America from central and southern Alaska to the Great Lakes and the northeast coast of the United States from Maine south to North Carolina. It breeds over most of Canada apart from the southwest and Arctic regions.

Birds are present all year in southern Alaska, the Great Lakes, and the north-east USA, but most birds winter to the south of the breeding range as far as Mexico with small numbers reaching Hawaii, Central America and the West Indies. Vagrants have reached Colombia and Venezuela and there is a report from Ecuador and another from Peru. The first European record was of a bird ringed in New Brunswick which was caught on a boat in Spanish waters in 1937 and there have been a number of additional records from Western Europe since 1990. The first British record was in 1994 in Cheshire.

It usually nests in colonies near water on coasts, islands, and cliffs. It also nests on rooftops in some cities. It feeds at sea and on beaches, mudflats, lakes, rivers, fields, and refuse dumps. It roosts in open areas close to feeding sites.

== Behavior ==
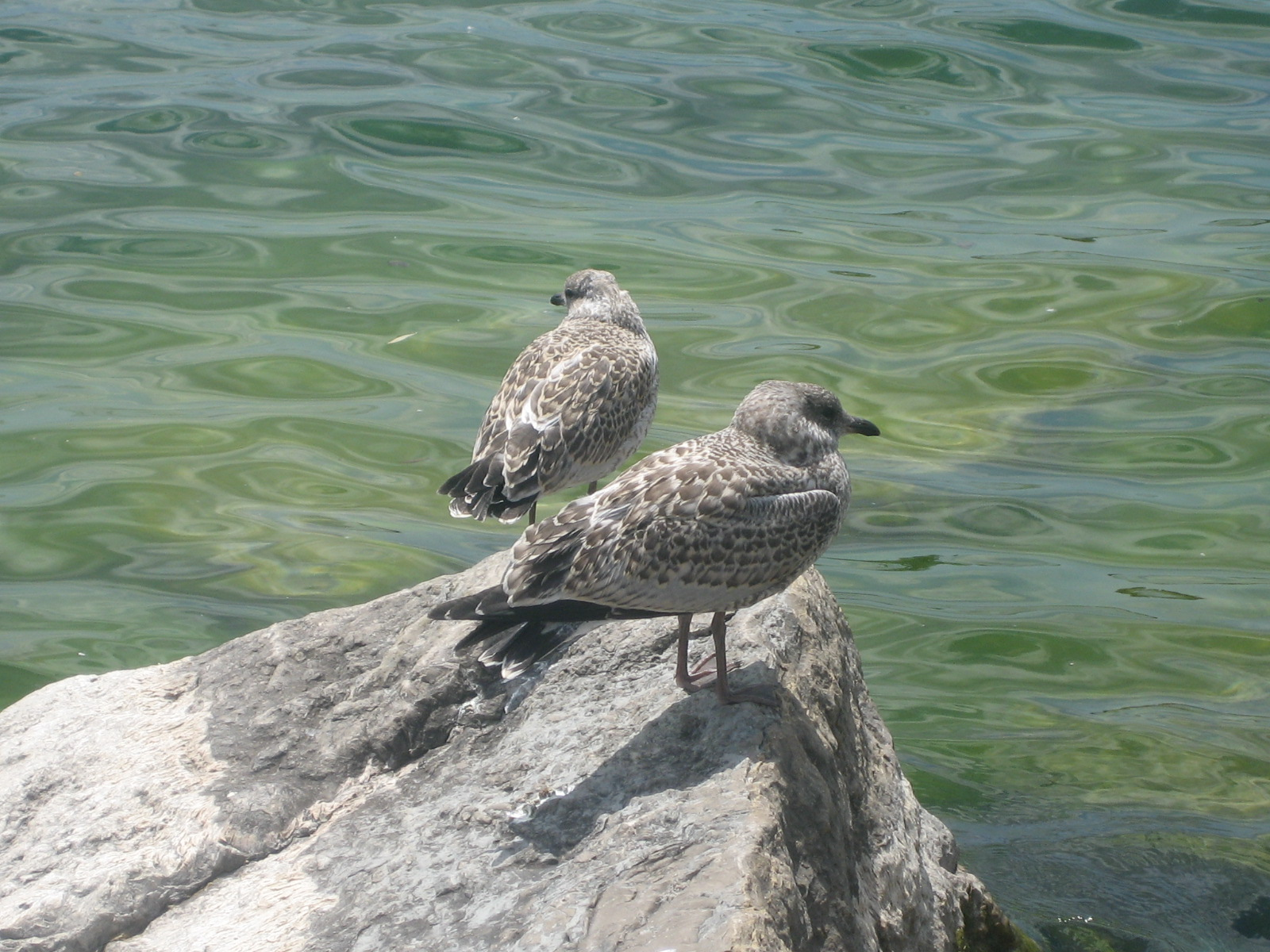
Two fledglings resting on a rock on the shore on Lake Ontario

=== Feeding ===
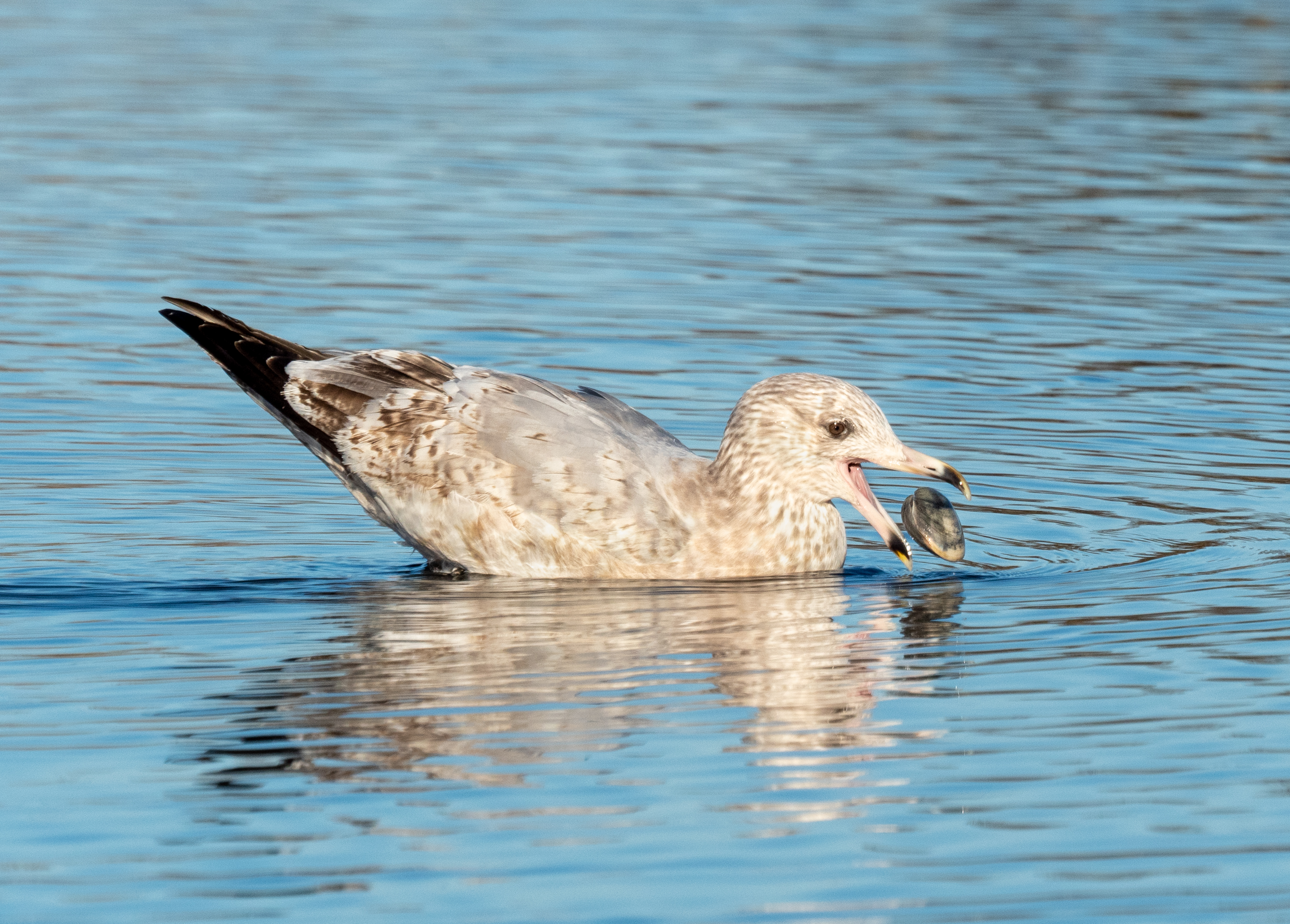
Immature herring gull manipulating a clam

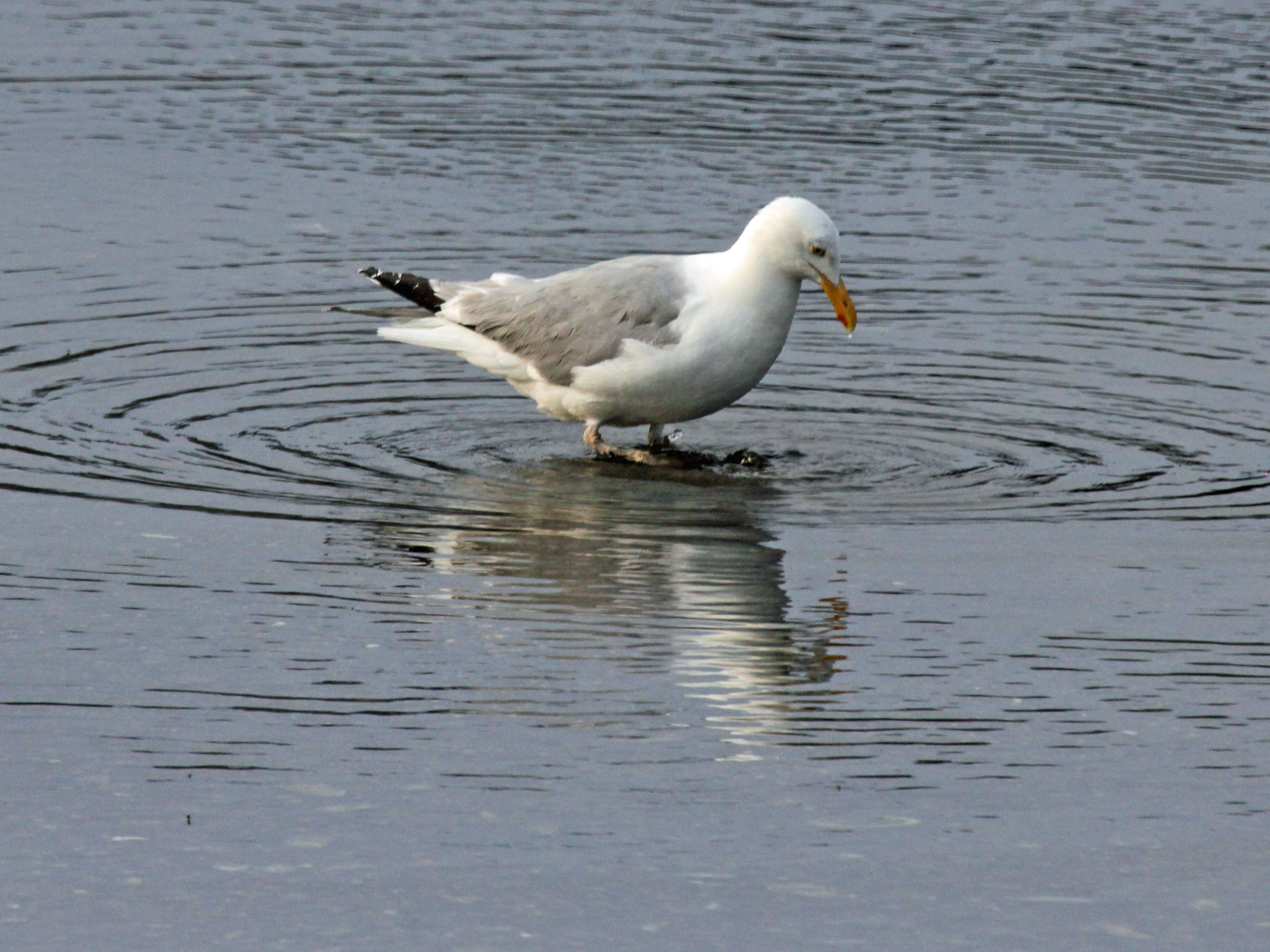
Stomping feet to help find prey

It has a varied diet, including marine invertebrates such as mussels, crabs, sea urchins, and squid; fish such as capelin, alewife, and smelt; insects; and other birds including their chicks and eggs. It often feeds on carrion and human refuse. Food is plucked from the surface of the shore or sea or is caught by dipping underwater or by shallow plunge-diving. They also feed on clams and mussels by dropping them from a height on hard surfaces such as roads or rocks to break their shells. There is some question about whether this behavior is learned or innate, although it seems to be learned.

=== Reproduction ===
Pairs form in March or April. The nest is a scrape on the ground lined with vegetation such as grass, seaweed, and feathers. Usually three eggs are laid over a four- to six-day period. They are 72 mm (2.8 in) long and are variable in color with brown markings on a pale blue, olive, or cinnamon background. The eggs are incubated for 30–32 days beginning when the second egg is laid. The young birds fledge after 6–7 weeks and are fed in the nest area for several more weeks. They continue to be cared for by the parents until they are about 6 months old. Both parents are involved in building the nest, incubating the eggs and feeding the young. It has been observed that some pairs cement a close bond, staying in watchful proximity of each other year-round; Other gulls display more independence, but may take the same mate each spring.

== Status ==
The species became quite rare during the 19th century when it was hunted for its eggs and feathers. From the 1930s to the 1960s, it increased rapidly due to protection from hunting, increased waste from fisheries to feed on, and less competition for small fish and invertebrates as humans reduced the populations of large fish, whales, and pinnipeds (seals). It was one of many impacted by high DDT usage, and was the target of the study that first linked DDT to eggshell thinning. Population growth leveled off during the 1970s and 80s and may now be declining in some areas.
