= Deputy Speaker of the National Assembly of Pakistan =

Parliamentary office in Pakistan

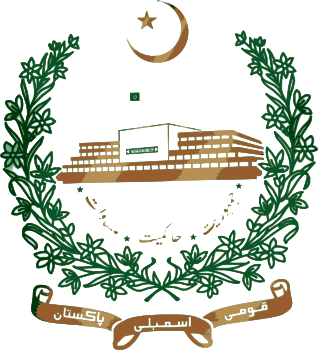
- Incumbent; Ghulam Mustafa Shah since 1 March 2024
- National Assembly of Pakistan
- Member of: National Assembly of Pakistan
- Seat: Islamabad
- Appointer: Elected by the National Assembly
- Term length: As long as the current assembly remains in power, the Deputy Speaker continues to exercise its authority
- Constituting instrument: Constitution of Pakistan, Article 53(3) Chapter 2
- First holder: Maulvi Tamizuddin Khan

The deputy speaker of the National Assembly of Pakistan presides over the assembly whenever the speaker is absent or unable to perform his or her duties. The office has its roots in 1947 when the Deputy Speaker was addressed as the Deputy President of the legislative assembly. After the ratification of the 1973 Constitution of Pakistan, the office was re-established. Currently, the position of Deputy Speaker is held by Ghulam Mustafa Shah who was elected by the National Assembly of Pakistan on 1 March 2024 along with the Speaker Ayaz Sadiq.

== Role and Responsibilities ==
The office of the Deputy Speaker of the National Assembly is created by Article 53 of the Chapter 2 in Part III of the Constitution of Pakistan. The Deputy Speaker acts as Speaker on occasions when the Speaker is unable to do so. If both the Speaker and Deputy Speaker are unable to fulfil the role, another person is appointed to temporarily act as Speaker.

== List ==
Deputy Speakers of the National Assembly
Order	Deputy Speaker	Time Duration	Party
—	Maulvi Tamizuddin Khan	23 February 1948 – 23 February 1948	Pakistan Muslim League
1	Cecil Edward Gibbon	23 February 1948 – 13 December 1948	Pakistan Muslim League
2	Muhammad Hashim Gazdar	23 February 1948 – 24 October 1954	Pakistan Muslim League
3	Cecil Edward Gibbon	12 August 1955 – 7 October 1958	Pakistan Muslim League
4	Mohammad Afzal Cheema	11 June 1962 – 12 January 1965	Pakistan Muslim League
5	Mohammad Abul Quasem	11 June 1962 – 12 January 1965	Pakistan Muslim League
6	Fazal Elahi Chaudhry	12 January 1965 – 25 March 1969	Pakistan Muslim League
7	A. T. M. Abdul Mateen	12 January 1965 – 25 March 1969	Pakistan Muslim League
8	Mohammad Haneef Khan	15 August 1972 – 10 August 1973	
9	Ashraf Khatoon Abbasi	11 August 1973 – 10 January 1977	Pakistan Peoples Party
10	Abdul Fateh	27 March 1977 – 5 July 1977	
11	Wazir Ahmed Jogezai	23 March 1985 To 29 May 1988	Pakistan Muslim League
12	Ashraf Khatoon Abbasi	3 December 1988 – 6 August 1990	Pakistan Peoples Party
13	Mohammad Nawaz Khokhar	4 November 1990 – 18 July 1993	Pakistan Muslim League (N)
14	Syed Zafar Ali Shah	17 October 1993 – 5 November 1996	Pakistan Peoples Party
15	Chaudhry Jaffar Iqbal	16 February 1997 – 20 August 2001	Pakistan Muslim League (N)
16	Sardar Muhammad Yaqoob	19 November 2002 – 15 November 2007	Pakistan Muslim League (Q)
17	Faisal Karim Kundi	19 March 2008 To 16 March 2013	Pakistan Peoples Party
18	Murtaza Javed Abbasi	3 June 2013 – 31 May 2018	Pakistan Muslim League (N)
19	Qasim Suri	15 August 2018 – 16 April 2022	Pakistan Tehreek-e-Insaf
20	Zahid Akram Durrani	21 April 2022- 9 August 2023	Jamiat Ulema-e-Islam (F)
21	Syed Ghulam Mustafa Shah	1 March 2024- Incumbent	Pakistan Peoples Party

== See also ==
- Speaker of National Assembly
- Senate of Pakistan
- Politics of Pakistan
- Prime Minister of Pakistan
- Constitution of Pakistan
