= Bird rarities committee =

A bird rarities committee or bird records committee is a committee which exists to validate records of rare birds in a particular country or region.

Many countries have national rarities committees; in some areas, such as Europe, coverage is near-complete at a national level. European national committees are all members of the Association of European Rarities Committees.

Some countries have committees covering more localised areas - e.g. in the United States, most states have their own state records committee, and in Britain, each county has its own county records committee.

A records committee differs from a list committee in that the latter just compile a list of the species found in an area, and do not typically assess every individual record of the rare species.

== See also ==
- List of the member committees of the Association of European Rarities Committees
