= Maliha Ali Asghar Khan =

Pakistani politician

Maliha Ali Asghar Khan MPA

Member of the Khyber Pakhtunkhwa Assembly
- In office 13 August 2018 – 18 January 2023
- Constituency: WR-02
- In office 31 May 2013 – 28 May 2018
- Constituency: WR-05

Personal details
- Party: PTI (2013-present)
- Spouse: Ali Asghar Khan (m. 2015)
- Relatives: Asghar Khan (father-in-law)
- Occupation: Politician

Maliha Ali Asghar Khan is a Pakistani politician from Mansehra District, belong to Pakistan Tehreek-e-Insaf who had been member of the Provincial Assembly of Khyber Pakhtunkhwa from August 2018 until January 2023. She also served as a member of different committees. She is the wife of Pakistan Tehreek-e-Insaf's leader from Abbottabad, Ali Asghar Khan and daughter in law of Air Marshal Asghar Khan.

== Political career ==
Maliha was elected as the member of the Khyber Pakhtunkhwa Assembly on ticket of Pakistan Tehreek-e-Insaf from Constituency WR-05 in the 2013 Pakistani general election.

She was re-elected to the Provincial Assembly of Khyber Pakhtunkhwa as a candidate of PTI on a reserved seat for women in the 2018 Pakistani general election.

== Personal life ==
Maliha married fellow Pakistan Tehreek-e-Insaf member Ali Asghar Khan in Islamabad January 2015.
