= Ashraf Abbasi =

Pakistani politician

9th & 12th Deputy Speaker of the National Assembly of Pakistan First Female Deputy Speaker of the National Assembly of Pakistan
- In office 3 December 1988 – 6 August 1990
- Preceded by: Wazir Ahmed Jogezai
- Succeeded by: M. Nawaz Khokhar
- In office 11 August 1973 – 10 January 1977
- Preceded by: Mohammad Hanif Khan
- Succeeded by: Abul Fateh

Personal details
- Born: 2 January 1925 Larkana
- Died: 3 August 2014 (aged 89) Larkana, Sindh, Pakistan
- Party: Pakistan Peoples Party
- Children: 3
- Education: Dow Medical College
- Occupation: Politician
- Profession: Physician

Ashraf Khatoon Abbasi (Urdu: اشرف عباسی; Sindhi: اشرف عباسي) was a Pakistani politician and the first female Deputy Speaker of the National Assembly of Pakistan. She was a close supporter of the Pakistan Peoples Party (PPP) and its leaders Zulfikar Ali Bhutto and Benazir Bhutto. She was also a member of the West Pakistan Assembly from 1962 until 1965. She joined the PPP and won from her constituency in 1970.

== Personal life ==
Abbasi was born on 2 January 1925, in Larkana. Her father Saeed Khan Abbasi was a landlord in the area. She received her secondary education from DJ College Sindh in 1940. She also studied at the Lady Hardinge Medical College in Delhi. She obtained her MBBS degree from the Dow Medical College Karachi. Abbasi opened her clinic in Larkana. She also served at Civil Hospital Larkana. She participated in the promotion of education. She died on 4 August 2014 in the village of Waleed, Larkana. She was the mother of three sons, including Safdar Ali Abbasi, who became a PPP senator, Munawar Ali Abbasi (Ex-MPA Sindh Assembly), and Akhtar Ali Abbasi.

== Career ==
Abbasi was a member of the West Pakistan Assembly from 1962 to 1965. Later, she joined the PPP, winning a National Assembly seat in 1970. She became the first woman deputy speaker of the National Assembly, serving from 1973 to 1977 and again from 1988 to 1990. She also served as the chairperson of the Shaheed Zulfikar Ali Bhutto Institute of Science and Technology, Larkana campus, and was a member of the Allama Iqbal Open University, Islamabad, and University of Sindh, Jamshoro, syndicates. She was also a member of the constitution committee. She established the Mothers Trust in 1996 to help poor women. Abbasi wrote her biography titled Jaikey Halan Haikliyoon ("The Women Who Walk Alone").

== Publications ==
- Jaikey Halan Haikliyoon ("The Women Who Walk Alone").

== Death ==
Ashraf Abbasi died on Sunday, 3 August 2014. She was laid to rest in Waleed Muhalla Graveyard, Larkana.
