= List of the member committees of the Association of European Rarities Committees =

The following is a list of the European rarities committees and equivalent bodies which comprise the membership of the Association of European Rarities Committees (AERC):

- The Avifaunistische Kommission (Austria)
- The Belarus Ornitho-Faunistic Commission (Belarus)
- The Commission d'Homologation (Belgium - Wallonia) and the Belgische Avifaunistische Homologatiecommissie (Belgium - Flanders)
- BUNARCO and the Bulgarian Society for the protection of Birds (Bulgaria)
- The Cyprus Rarities Committee (Cyprus)
- The Czech Faunistic Committee (Czech Republic)
- Sjaldenhedsudvalget (Denmark)
- Eesti Linnuharulduste Komisjon (Estonia)
- Suomen Lintutieteellisen Yhdistyksen Rariteettikomitea (Finland)
- Comite d'Homologation National and Commission de l'Avifaune Française (France)
- The Deutsche Seltenheitenkommission (Germany)
- The British Birds Rarities Committee and the British Ornithologists' Union Records Committee (Great Britain)
- George Handrinos (Greece)
- The Hungarian Rarities Committee (Hungary)
- Flækingsfuglanefndin (Iceland)
- The Irish Rare Birds Committee (Republic of Ireland)
- The Comitato di Omologazione Italiano (Italy)
- Latvijas Ornithofaunistikas Komisijas (Latvia)
- Lithuanian Raritie Commitie (Lietuvos ornitofaunistinė komisija) (Lithuania)
- The Luxemburger Homologations-Kommission (Luxembourg)
- Birdlife Malta (Malta)
- The Commissie Dwaalgasten Nedelerlandse Avifauna (Netherlands)
- The Norsk Sjeldenhetskomite for Fugle (Norway)
- The Komisja Faunistyczna (Poland)
- The Comité Português de Raridades (Portugal)
- The Societatea Ornitologica Româna (Romania)
- The Slovenska Ornithologicka Spolocnost (Slovakia)
- The Bird Watching & Bird Study Association of Slovenia (Slovenia)
- The Comite de Rarezas de SEO (Spain)
- The Sveriges Ornitologiska Förenings Raritetskommitte (Sweden)
- The Schweizerische Avifaunistische Kommission (Switzerland)
- The Ukrainian Avifaunistic Commission (Ukraine)
