= Central Institute for Cotton Research =

Cotton research institute in India

ICAR-Central Institute for Cotton Research, Nagpur
- Established: April 1976; 50 years ago
- Mission: Cotton research
- Director: Dr. V. N. Waghmare
- Owner: ICAR
- Location: Two campuses: 1. Nagpur: NH 44 (Nagpur Wardha Road) about 14 km from the Nagpur Railway Station and about 5 km from the Nagpur Airport.; 2. Sirsa: NH9, Sirsa, Haryana., India
- Coordinates: 21.037°N 79.055°E
- Interactive map of ICAR-Central Institute for Cotton Research, Nagpur
- Website: Official Website

Central Institute for Cotton Research (CICR), is a central research institute established in 1976 by the Indian Council of Agricultural Research to promote long-term research efforts in cotton production and provide support and conduct applied research on cotton with the active involvement of State Universities. The research efforts of CICR fall under the All India Coordinated Cotton Improvement Project (AICCIP), initiated by the Council in 1967. Its headquarters are located in Nagpur and the other two regional units are located at Coimbatore, Tamil Nadu and Sirsa, Haryana.

== Campuses ==
CICR has two campus at Coimbatore, Tamil Nadu and Sirsa in Haryana.

=== Nagpur Campus ===
Central Institute for Cotton Research, Nagpur ('CICR, Nagpur or CICRN) in collaboration with the Government of Maharashtra, implemented a pilot project in the Vidarbha region (highly prone to farmer suicides), based on a Brazilian model to enhance the per-acre yield of cotton while reducing its per-acre cultivation cost. The Brazilian model is based on straight cotton crops while Indian government's model promotes the use of Bt cotton crops.

=== Sirsa Campus ===
Central Institute for Cotton Research, Sirsa ('CICR, Sirsa or CICRS) was established at Sirsa city in collaboration with the Government of Haryana. It is located across the Chaudhary Devi Lal University on NH9.

== Activities ==
CICR is a center of excellence for cotton research and development in India. It focuses on developing crops, production methods, technologies, products, and services to farmers, industries and other research and development organizations.

=== Studies ===
==== Socio-economic impact assessment of Bt cotton in India ====
CICR conducted survey of farmers found that cotton production increased by over 9% with the use hybrid Bt cotton seeds, helping India become a net exporter of cotton. The study on also highlighted that area under cotton has increased by 4.91% in the last 10 years. The survey was done in nine-cotton growing states of Maharashtra, Punjab, Haryana, Rajasthan, Madhya Pradesh, Andhra Pradesh, Karnataka, Tamil Nadu and Gujarat. The survey also indicated to have recorded a zero suicide figure in Karnataka where the figure varied between 1-4 per cent.

=== Projects ===
Maharashtra Government in collaboration with CICR, implemented a pilot project in Vidarbha region, highly prone to farmer suicides; based on a Brazilian model to enhance the per-acre yield of cotton while reducing its per-acre cultivation cost. However, Since the Brazilian models are based on straight cotton crops while Indian government promotes the use of Bt cotton crops, there seemed to arise a contradiction in the policies followed.

In 2024, CICR sponsored a pilot project to leverage artificial-intelligence (AI) methods for real-time pest monitoring to control pink bollworm infestation of cotton crops.

== See also ==
- List of think tanks in India
- Central Cotton Research Institute, Multan (Pakistan)
