= Mehtab Abbasi =

Pakistani politician

Sardar Mehtab Abbasi
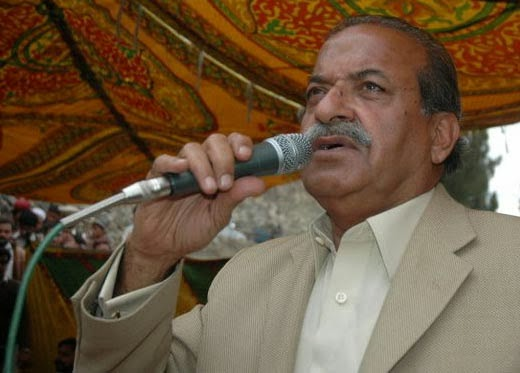

27th Governor of Khyber Pakhtunkhwa
- In office 15 April 2014 – 8 February 2016
- President: Mamnoon Hussain
- Prime Minister: Nawaz Sharif
- Preceded by: Shaukatullah Khan
- Succeeded by: Iqbal Zafar Jhagra

Ministry of Railways (Pakistan)
- In office 2008–2008
- Prime Minister: Yusuf Raza Gilani
- Constituency: NA-17 Abbottabad-II

Member of the Senate of Pakistan
- In office 2003–2008
- Prime Minister: Mir Zafarullah Khan Jamali, Shaukat Aziz

17th Chief Minister of Khyber Pakhtunkhwa
- In office 21 February 1997 – 12 October 1999
- Preceded by: Raja Sikander Zaman
- Succeeded by: Governor's rule

Personal details
- Born: Sardar Mehtab Ahmed Khan Abbasi; 13 January 1953 (age 73) Malkot, North-West Frontier Province, Pakistan
- Party: AP (2024-present)
- Other political affiliations: PMLN (1993-2023)
- Relations: Sardar Fareed Ahmed Khan Abbasi (cousin)
- Children: Sardar Shamoon Yar Khan (son)
- Education: Government High School, Murree; Sir Sayyad College, Rawalpindi
- Occupation: Politician
- Profession: Lawyer

Sardar Mehtab Ahmed Khan Abbasi (Urdu/Hindko: سردار مہتاب احمد خان عباسی; born 13 January 1953) is a Pakistani politician from Abbottabad who began his political career as an independent candidate in the 1985 election. He won seats in both the provincial and national assembly. He also won all subsequent elections up to that of 2013.

Sardar Mehtab served as Governor of Khyber Pakhtunkhwa, Pakistan from 2014 to 2016, Chief Minister of Khyber Pakhtunkhwa from 1997 to 1999, and Federal Minister for Railways in 2008. He is politically affiliated with the Pakistan Muslim League (N). He served as a senator for five years beginning in March 2003, until he won the NA-17 Abbottabad-I seat for the National Assembly of Pakistan in the 2008 general election.

== Early life and education ==
Born into a Dhund Abbasi family in Malkot, a village in the Abbottabad District of Khyber Pakhtunkhwa, Sardar Mehtab passed matriculation from Govt High School Murree and graduated from the Sir Syed School in Rawalpindi. He then did his LLB and practiced law in Rawalpindi. Abandoning law, he joined his father Sardar Muhammad Nawaz Khan's clothing business in Saddar, Rawalpindi. His uncle Sardar Sarfaraz Khan has also been a politician and encouraged his nephew Sardar Mehtab to get into politics as well.

His cousin and brother-in-law Sardar Fareed Ahmed Khan Abbasi is also a politician.

His son Sardar Shamoon Yar Khan has been an MPA.

== Political career ==
=== Provincial Minister for Law ===
Sardar Mehtab was elected to a provincial seat after winning the 1986 general election. He served as Provincial Minister for Law and Political Affairs from 1986 until 1988, when another general election was called.

=== Federal Minister for Kashmir Affairs and Northern Areas (1990–1993) ===
In 1990, Sardar Mehtab was elected to the National Assembly, for which he abandoned his provincial seat. He was subsequently appointed Federal Minister for Kashmir Affairs and Northern Areas. He held the post until 1993 when the General Assembly was dissolved and new elections were called.

=== As Chief Minister of KPK (1997–1999) ===
Abbasi became the 16th Chief Minister of Khyber Pakhtunkhwa on 21 February 1997, taking over from Raja Sikander Zaman; he served until 12 October 1999.

During his tenure as Chief Minister, Abbasi approved the Chief Minister Development Plan prepared by Professor Subhan Qureshi, which was later updated to Dairy Science Park through two international workshops held at the University of Agriculture, Peshawar in 2011 and 2013 respectively. The Park has given birth to the Peshawar Meat Company, which is to be implemented jointly by the University of Agriculture, Peshawar, the Department of Local Government and Rural Development, the Khyber Pakhtunkhwa Chamber of Commerce and Industry, the Small and Medium Enterprises Development Authority, and the Khyber Pakhtunkhwa Board of Investment and Trade.

=== Post-CM political career ===
Abbasi could not contest the general elections in 2002 for the National Assembly and had to settle for being a senator from March 2003 – March 2008.

=== As senator (2003–2008) ===
Abbasi was among the few politicians who remained in Pakistan. He was an integral part of the party during the exile of Nawaz Sharif and was elected to the Senate of Pakistan in 2003 holding this office until the 2008 general elections.

=== Member of National Assembly (2008–2013) ===
In the 2008 general elections, Mehtab Ahmed Khan won the NA-17 Abbottabad seat. He also won the PF-45 provincial assembly seat and had to vacate both the Senate and the Provincial Assembly seats after the victory since a parliamentarian in Pakistan can only keep one seat. His son Shamoon Yar Khan won this seat. He was elected as the federal Minister for Railways on 31 March 2008 in the initial coalition between the PPP and PML(N) after the elections. However, he, along with the other PML(N) ministers, resigned less than two months later after differences regarding the restoration of the judges who were removed during the 2007 Pakistani state of emergency.

In the 2013 general elections, Mehtab Ahmad Khan lost to his political rival for a seat in the national assembly.

=== Post 2013 elections ===
Abbasi was elected as the Opposition Leader in the Provincial Assembly of Khyber Pakhtunkhwa on 3 June 2013; he retained the position until 9 April 2014 when he resigned to take the oath as the governor of Khyber Pakhtunkhwa.

=== Governor of Khyber Pakhtunkhwa ===
The President of Pakistan, Mamnoon Hussain, on the advice of then Prime Minister, Nawaz Sharif, appointed Abbasi as Governor of Khyber Pakhtunkhwa. Abbasi took the oath of office on 15 April 2014 in Peshawar. On 8 February 2016, Abbasi resigned as Governor of Khyber Pakhtunkhwa.

=== Head of Aviation Affairs ===
After resigning as the Governor of Khyber Pakhtunkhwa and a year-long hiatus, Abbasi took up the role of aviation advisor to the prime minister on 14 February 2017. Abbasi took this position to improve the loss-making Pakistan International Airlines (PIA) and turn around its operations. In this short time, he has made big changes in the PIA, whereby the CEO and CCO were replaced. Furthermore, improvements have been made in aircraft surveillance to curb drug trafficking, which was rampant in the past. The New Islamabad Airport was also completed under his supervision.

=== Leaving PML-N ===
He left the PML(N) on 15 December 2023. On 20 January 2024, his party membership was officially terminated after he announced his support for Ali Khan Jadoon, the Pakistan Tehreek-e-Insaf-backedindependent candidate, in the 2024 Pakistani general election for NA-17 Abbottabad-II.

Political offices
Preceded by Raja Sikander Zaman	Chief Minister of Khyber Pakhtunkhwa; 1997–1999	Succeeded by Akram Khan Durrani
Preceded by Shaukatullah Khan	Governor of Khyber Pakhtunkhwa; 15 April 2014 – 8 February 2016	Succeeded by Iqbal Zafar Jhagra
