= Constituency WR-05 =

Reserved seat in a Pakistani provincial assembly

- Constituency for the Khyber Pakhtunkhwa Assembly

Current constituency
- Member: Maliha Ali Asghar Khan

Constituency WR-05 is a reserved seat for women in the Khyber Pakhtunkhwa Assembly.

== See also ==
- Constituency PK-53 (Mansehra-I)
- Constituency PK-54 (Mansehra-II)
- Constituency PK-55 (Mansehra-III)
- Constituency PK-56 (Mansehra-IV)
- Constituency PK-57 (Mansehra-V)
