= Amanullah Khan Jadoon =

Federal Minister

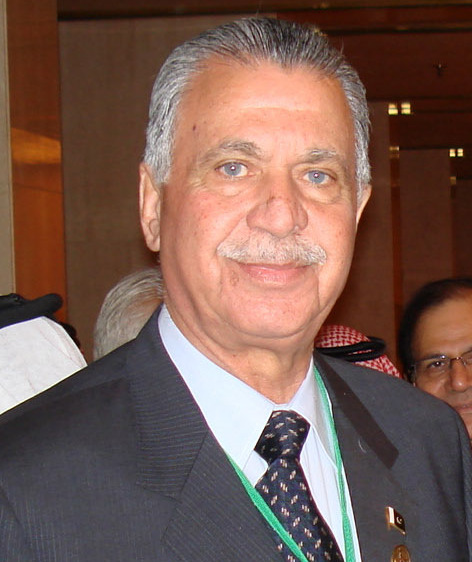
- Amanullah Khan Jadoon

Federal Minister for Petroleum & Natural Resources
- In office 2002–2007
- Succeeded by: Ahsan Ullah Khan (Caretaker)

Federal Minister for Kashmir Affairs
- In office 1993–1933

Provincial Minister for Planning and Development of Khyber-Pakhtunkhwa
- In office 1985–1988

Provincial Minister for Communications of Khyber-Pakhtunkhwa
- In office 1988–1990

Personal details
- Party: Pakistan Muslim League (Q)
- Children: Ali Khan Jadoon

Amanullah Khan Jadoon is a Pakistani politician who served as the Federal Minister for Petroleum & Natural Resources from 2002 to 2007.

== Political career ==
Amanullah Khan Jadoon was twice elected as an MPA, (Member of the Provincial Assembly) of Khyber-Pakhtunkhwa. On being elected in 1985 to the NA-12 (Abbottabad) constituency, he became the planning and Development minister for Khyber-Pakhtunkhwa and after the 1988 election he served as communication and works minister. In 1993, as part of the Federal Caretaker Cabinet, he served as the Federal Minister for Kashmir Affairs.

In the 2002 elections, he was elected as a Member of the National Assembly (MNA) for his constituency, NA-17: Abbottabad. His constituency is a mix of urban and rural areas, as it includes part of Abbottabad city and the adjoining Galiyat mountain valleys. His primary political rival was Mehtab Ahmed Khan in the constituency. On 2 September 2004, he assumed his role as Federal Minister for Petroleum & Natural Resources.
