= Afzal Cheema =

Pakistani politician

Justice Mohammad Afzal Cheema

Chairman of the Council of Islamic Ideology
- In office 26 September 1977 – 16 May 1980
- President: Muhammad Zia-ul-Haq
- Preceded by: Hamoodur Rahman
- Succeeded by: Tanzil-ur-Rahman

Senior Justice of the Supreme Court of Pakistan
- In office 8 October 1974 – 31 December 1977
- Appointed by: Fazal Ilahi Chaudhry

Acting President of Pakistan
- In office 11 June 1962 – 29 November 1962
- Preceded by: Ayub Khan
- Succeeded by: Ayub Khan

4th Senior Deputy Speaker of the National Assembly of Pakistan
- In office 11 June 1962 – 12 January 1965
- Preceded by: Cecil Edward Gibbon
- Succeeded by: Fazal Ilahi Chaudhry

Member of the National Assembly of Pakistan
- In office 12 June 1965 – 25 March 1969
- Constituency: NW-31 (Lyallpur-II)
- In office 8 June 1962 – 7 June 1965
- Constituency: NW-35 (Lyallpur-IV)

Member of the Provincial Assembly of Punjab
- In office 7 May 1951 – 14 October 1955
- Constituency: Lyallpur-IX

Personal details
- Born: 1 January 1913 Kathore Kalan, Punjab, British India (present-day Punjab, Pakistan)
- Died: 4 August 2008 (aged 95)
- Education: University of the Punjab

Justice Mohammad Afzal Cheema (Punjabi and Urdu: محمد افضل چیمہ; 1 January 1913 – 4 August 2008) was a Pakistani politician and judge. Justice Cheema is the only Pakistani to reach the top positions in all branches of state. He served as the acting President of Pakistan, Judge of the High Court and then Supreme Court of Pakistan, Senior Deputy Speaker of the National Assembly of Pakistan, Federal Law Secretary, and Chairman of the Council of Islamic Ideology. He is considered the most prominent personality in the Cheema tribe and is commonly referred to as the "Chief of Cheemas".

== Early age and education ==
Justice Cheema was born in a small village named Kathore Kalan, 303 JB near Gojra, Toba Tek Singh in 1913. After graduation from Islamia College in 1932, he received his master's degree in English literature from the University of the Punjab in 1934. Later, circumstances forced him to return to his native village, where he oversaw the affairs of his family and the village following his father's sudden demise, who was the head of the village. A desire for continued professional education led him into the field of law in 1945. In 1947, he received his law degree and subsequently started a law practice in Lyallpur, now known as Faisalabad.

== Participation in the Pakistan movement ==
Justice Cheema played an active role in the Pakistan movement and supported Mohammad Ali Jinnah. He also participated in the gathering in Lahore on the 23 March 1940. He had several meetings with national poet Allama Iqbal and had cordial and personal relations with many Muslim leaders of the Indian subcontinent, including Mohammad Ali Bogra, Feroz Khan Noon, Syed Ata Ullah Shah Bukhari, Molvi Tamizuddin Khan.

== Political career ==
Justice Cheema was elected as member of the West Pakistan Legislative Assembly in one unit system in 1951 and later elected as the Deputy Opposition Leader. He became the member of the National Assembly of Pakistan in 1962 for Toba Tek Singh (The largest Constituency of the country at that time). Subsequently, he was elected Senior Deputy Speaker of the National Assembly of Pakistan by a single vote, defeating the Treasury Candidate. Throughout his tenure as Senior Deputy Speaker, he served as the Speaker of the National Assembly because of the illness of Maulvi Tamizuddin Khan and absence of Fazul ul Qadir. Justice Cheema is the only Speaker of the National Assembly of Pakistan who had cast his Casting vote in the House twice: once in favour of the Treasury and once in favour of the Opposition. He also served as the Acting President of Pakistan in the absence of Field Marshal Ayub Khan more than three times.

== Judicial career ==
Besides his political career, Justice Cheema served as Judge of West Pakistan High Court and also as Federal Law Secretary. He headed the team which drafted the first complete, comprehensive constitution of Pakistan now known as the 1973 Constitution. He was elevated to the Supreme Court and retired as the Senior Most Judge of the Supreme Court of Pakistan.

== Council of Islamic ideology ==
After his retirement from the Supreme Court, Cheema was made the full-time Chairman of Council of Islamic Ideology (Islami Nazeryati Council) and was responsible for the conversion of the parts of the Pakistani common law into Sharia Laws.

== International service ==
=== United Nations ===
Cheema led the Pakistani Delegation at the United Nations annual conference twice. He also represented Pakistan in the Annual Conference of the Parliamentarians held in Caracas, Venezuela as leader of the Pakistani delegation.

=== Muslim World League ===
Cheema served in the Muslim World League (MWL), an international Muslim organisation having observer status in the UN and OIC, as its Secretary General, Asian Branch for more than 15 years. His contribution as Secretary General of the MWL was in Humanitarian relief and Mediation for the Muslim Ummah and in particular for the Muslims of the Asian region. His main accomplishments were:

- Approval and Opening of the first Islamic Centre (largest in the Asian Region) in Xinjiang province in China.
- Repatriation efforts for stranded Pakistanis often referred to as Biharis in Bangladesh
- Contribution for the revival of the Islamic Values and the religion in various Asian States
- Successful mediation among the various factions in Afghanistan

== Honours ==
He was awarded the Highest Civil Award of South Korea by President Roh Tae-woo for his endeavours in bringing Pakistan and South Korea closer through the establishment of diplomatic relations and for the formation of the Pak-Korea Friendship Association.

== Timeline ==
1. Deputy Leader of the Opposition in the West Pakistan Legislative Assembly. 1951–1955
2. Senior Deputy Speaker of the National Assembly. 1962–1965.
3. Acting President of Pakistan. More than thrice. 1962–1965.
4. Judge of the West Pakistan/Lahore High Court. 1965–1973.
5. Federal Law Secretary. 1973–1975.
6. Judge of the Supreme Court of Pakistan. 1975–1979.
7. Chairman Council of Islamic Ideology. 1977–1980.
8. Secretary General of Muslim World League Asian Branch. 1980–2000.

== Book ==
- The Qadiani Problem: A Legal and Historical Perspective : Working Paper, 1986.
- Ijtehad and Islamization of Laws, 2010.
