= Omar Asghar Khan =

Pakistani politician (1953–2002)

- عمر اصغر خان

Federal Minister for Environment, Local Government and Rural Development, Labour, Manpower, and Overseas Pakistanis
- In office 6 November 1999 – 22 December 2001
- Preceded by: Syed Ahmed Mahmud (Note: As Minister for Environment, Local Government, and Rural Development.); Sheikh Rasheed Ahmad (Note: As Minister of Labour, Manpower and Overseas Pakistanis.)
- Succeeded by: Owais Ahmed Ghani

Personal details
- Born: 3 July 1953 Abbottabad, North-West Frontier Province, Pakistan
- Died: 25 June 2002 (aged 48) Karachi, Sindh, Pakistan
- Resting place: Abbottabad, Pakistan
- Party: Qaumi Jamhoori Party (2001)
- Other political affiliations: Tehreek-e-Istiqlal
- Children: 3
- Parent: Asghar Khan (father)
- Relatives: Aslam Khan (uncle); Ali Asghar Khan (brother)
- Education: Abbottabad Public School (expelled); Pakistan Military Academy; University of Peshawar; University of Essex, BA (Hons); University of Cambridge, (MPhil)
- Profession: Professor of philosophy, politics and economics

Military service
- Branch/service: Pakistan Army
- Years of service: 1972–1973
- Rank: Captain
- Unit: 5th Horse (Probyn's Horse)

Omar Asghar Khan (Note: Urdu: عمر اصغر خان; Sometimes spelled as Umar Asghar Khan, Umer Asghar Khan, or Omer Asghar Khan.) (3 July 1953 – 25 June 2002) also known as OAK among his colleagues, was a Pakistani former military officer, economist, author, social and political scientist, as well as a former professor of philosophy, politics and economics whose mysterious death made headlines. He was the eldest son of Air Marshal Asghar Khan.

Born in the North-Western Frontier, Khan was expelled from Abbottabad Public School after leading a boycott of classes in 1970. He graduated from the Pakistan Military Academy and was commissioned into the Pakistan Army in 1972. Disturbed by the 1971 War and the military's actions in Balochistan, he resigned along with other officers who questioned military policy.

He went to the United Kingdom for higher education in 1975, earning a bachelor's degree in economics from the University of Essex and a master's from Cambridge, where he taught briefly. He returned to Pakistan in 1980 to teach economics at Punjab University. Here, he was part of a group of professors who supported civil liberties and opposed the martial law of General Zia-ul-Haq.

In the summer of 1983, the first of three show-cause notices was issued to Professor Khan, seeking an explanation as to why he should not face disciplinary action for allegedly "permitting" his wife to take part in an "illegal procession," (Note: Referring to a women's protest march in February 1983.) against General Zia's legal reforms. In November 1983, he was dismissed from the university under a martial law regulation, on grounds related both to this allegation and to his alleged involvement with trade union activism, without a proper hearing.

Subsequent to General Musharraf's October 1999 Pakistani coup d'état, Omar was offered the position of a federal minister and accepted the offer a month later. Following his resignation in December 2001, he founded the Qaumi Jamhoori Party, which he led until his mysterious death.

== Early life ==
Born on 3 July 1953 into a Pashtun family of the Afridi tribe, Omar was the eldest son of Asghar Khan and Amina Shamsie. He has two older sisters, Nasreen and Shireen, and a younger brother, Ali.

Omar and Ali attended the Abbottabad Public School. However, Omar was expelled from the school when he had organised the first ever boycott of classes in 1970.

== Personal life ==
Omar married Samina Khan and they have three children, daughter Yasmeen and sons Abdullah and Mustafa.

== Military career ==
In October 1971, Omar Asghar Khan joined the 49th course of the Pakistan Military Academy, which was later converted to the 1st Special Short Course. He graduated as Cadet Senior Under Officer (CSUO) from the battalion of Tariq Company and commissioned into the 5th Horse Regiment of the Pakistan Army on 15 April 1972 as a Second Lieutenant. He stood seventh place in a course of 400 cadets. In an interview, he said "I joined the army in reaction to public school culture."

Khan was among a small group of officers, which included Tariq Rahman, who read a lot and questioned established truths within the military. In 1973, he resigned in protest alongside Usman Afridi, who was court-martialed, as they had opposed the military's actions in East Pakistan and Balochistan.

In 2024, Tariq Rahman explained that Omar became interested in his views and "later became so influenced by my academic taste" and chose to pursue a Bachelor of Arts as a private candidate. Rahman clarified that he never persuaded Omar to leave the army nor did Omar become a "pacifist" as some army officers believed. According to Rahman, Omar told him that he resigned because President Zulfikar Ali Bhutto was against his father, Asghar Khan, and was a "non-starter" due to how vengeful Bhutto was.

== Transition to civilian life ==
According to Labour rights activist Karamat Ali, when Omar left the army, he began teaching in Lahore and allocated half his salary to support worker education and training at Pakistan Institute of Labor Education and Research.

In 1974, Omar and his brother Ali were kept in a police lockup for a few days in Lahore when they arrived to receive their father at the Lahore Junction railway station on one of his visits there.

== Professorship ==
In 1979, Omar returned to Pakistan. He became an economics professor at the Punjab University in 1980.

In August 1983, the first of three show-cause notices was issued to Professor Omar Asghar Khan, asking him to explain why he should not face disciplinary action for allegedly "permitting" his wife to take part in an "illegal procession," against General Zia-ul-Haq's legal reforms.

In November 1983, he was dismissed from the university under martial law regulation 51, (Note: "Martial Law Regulation 51 provides for prison terms of up to five years, fines, floggings and premature retirement for people employed by the government who engage in 'agitation' and 'subversive activity.'") on grounds related both to this allegation and to his alleged involvement with trade union activism, without a proper hearing.

On 4 November, Khan invoked article 4 of the Pakistani constitution, which guarantees the "right of individuals to be dealt in accordance with law" and denied the charges as false.

He also said: "This show cause notice is yet another link in the chain of harassment instituted against me by the University authorities at the instigation of elements interested in harassing me on account of my relationship with Air Marshal (Retd) Asghar Khan, who is my father. Victimisation is also being done on account of the memorandum I submitted in respect of the serious irregularities of students admission in the university."

== Political career ==
In 1986, Omar expressed concern over the US$4.2 billion aid package to Pakistan and said the government had compromised national security by accepting direct intervention in the economic affairs of the country. He became the chairman of the youth wing of his father's party, Tehreek-e-Istiqlal, in 1987. In August 1988, Khan addressed a rally in Nawansher and said that one of the biggest impediments in the way of socio-economic development of Pakistan was the countries' excessive dependence on loans from the United States.

Omar contested the 1988 Pakistani general election from NA-13 Abbottabad as a candidate of the Pakistan Awami Ittehad (PAI) and came in third place with 11,816 votes.

In the 1990 general election, Omar contested from NA-13 Abbottabad as a candidate of the PDA and was the runner-up, receiving 30,970 votes and lost to IJI candidate Gohar Ayub Khan. The elections were rigged by the military to bring Nawaz Sharif, the leader of the IJI to power. (Note: Omar's father, Asghar Khan filed a petition in 1996 to challenge the legitimacy of the 1990 election. This became known as the Asghar Khan case and Mehrangate. In 2012, several people involved in the scandal including Generals Mirza Aslam Beg, Asad Durrani, Hamid Gul, and banker Yunus Habib confessed to their role in rigging the election. That year, the Supreme Court of Pakistan ruled in favour of Asghar Khan and ordered the government to take action against those involved. Despite the ruling, no one has been held accountable and the case has been largely forgotten.)

In 1993, Prime Minister Benazir Bhutto established a committee led by Omar to investigate the widespread allegations of rigging in the 1990 election. However, the report it produced was dismissed by the Chief Election Commissioner retired Justice Naeemuddin, and Election Commission member retired Justice Khalilur Rehman, under pressure from President Ghulam Ishaq Khan and the military.

In July 1998, Omar, his father Air Marshal Asghar Khan, and Air Marshal Nur Khan, were among 63 retired Pakistani, Indian, and Bengali armed forces personnel who signed a joint statement urging Pakistan and India to refrain from developing nuclear weapons. Instead, they advocated for limiting nuclear research and development strictly to peaceful and beneficial purposes. They also called for the two countries to resolve their disputes through peaceful means and address their real problems of poverty and backwardness, rather than wasting their scarce resources on acquiring means of destruction.

=== Federal Minister (1999-2001) ===
Following the 1999 Pakistani coup d'état by General Musharraf, Omar was offered a position in Musharraf's cabinet. Nearly a month later, he accepted the offer and was sworn in on 6 November as Federal Minister for Environment, Local Government and Rural Development, Labour, Manpower, and Overseas Pakistanis.

Later that month, American journalist Barry Bearak published an article in The New York Times titled "Democracy in Pakistan: Can a General Be Trusted?" and said Omar Asghar Khan, known for campaigning against illegal harvesting of timber, had been invited to join the cabinet in charge of rural development and labour affairs. Bearak described Khan as a Cambridge-educated son of an air marshal who viewed the government's plans for decentralising power and increasing citizen participation positively. Khan also argued that, although there was no clear schedule for restoring democracy, the fragile condition of Pakistan meant reforms needed to proceed carefully rather than hastily.

In December 1999, Trudy Rubin of the Philadelphia Inquirer described him as a "handsome minister" and quoted Omar as saying he joined the Musharraf government to "try to get power down to the neighborhoods."

On 24 December 2001, Pakistani newspaper Dawn reported that President General Musharraf had a list of politicians he was considering for the position of prime minister in the post-2002 elections setup. The reported names included Omar Asghar Khan, Qazi Hussain Ahmad, Hamid Nasir Chattha, Aftab Shaban Mirani, and Ameen Faheem. The report framed this within broader concerns that Musharraf intended to engineer a controlled transition to civilian rule while retaining decisive power through the presidency and the military establishment. Though there is no evidence whether Omar supported or participated in any such arrangement.

=== Qaumi Jamhoori Party ===
On 28 December 2001, Omar launched the Qaumi Jamhoori Party. In an informal interview to Dawn in January 2002, he said that it would be a "people-oriented, forward-looking political party, essentially of the middle classes". On a question of speculation by some that the party was created by the establishment, Khan said: "Absolutely not; it is a totally false conception" and that the idea of forming a new party had started years ago and it was a mere coincidence that it had materialised only recently.

== Social work ==
In 1982, he helped establish the Pakistan Institute of Labor Education and Research.

Omar formed a non-governmental organisation (NGO) called Sungi in 1989 and became its executive director. Sungi gained nationwide fame and won several awards from foreign donor agencies. Its main objective was community based healthcare, forest protection, sustainable agriculture, women empowerment, and displaced persons.

He spearheaded a number of major initiatives, including advocating for the relocation of people who were impacted by the construction of the Tarbela Dam. Pakistani newspaper Dawn commended Omar for his efforts to stop deforestation in the Hazara region. He conducted research studies to better understand marginalised groups within society such as women, labourers, and farmers. Furthermore, he provided new ideas that promoted cooperation between NGOs, governmental bodies and donor agencies.

Under his leadership, Sungi expanded its work across areas such as Haripur, Balakot, Kaghan Valley, and other remote and isolated regions of Hazara. Through partnerships with local communities, he helped establish a wide network of small village based NGO's throughout the region.

Sungi received the 1996 United Nations Economic and Social Commission for Asia and the Pacific Award for "its exemplary work in the field of human resource development."

== Mysterious death ==
On the morning of 25 June 2002, Omar Asghar Khan had missed his routine appointments. His family knocked on the door of his room and received no response. They peeped through the only window of the room and found him hanging from a ceiling fan. Dawn reported that police claimed Khan had committed suicide, however the postmortem examination and circumstantial evidence had suggested otherwise. Khan's family also denied that it was a suicide.

Many, including Benazir Bhutto, believed that he had been murdered as he was a key witness in the misuse of Employees Old Age Benefit Institute (EOBI) funds and knew far too much.

== Legacy and commemorations ==
A year after his death, Vice Chairman of the Qaumi Jamhoori Party (Sindh), Akbar Abbas Zaidi, said during Omar Asghar Khan's ministership, Khan tried to find out who was involved in the embezzlement of Rs1 billion rupees, but he "was killed and still his killers are yet to be arrested".

Omar's younger brother, Ali Asghar Khan, recruited a group of activists to establish the Omar Asghar Khan Foundation (OAKDF), a non-governmental organisation (NGO) in his memory.

In April 2003, the Pakistan Institute of Labor Education and Research released a study on forced labour in the country and urged the government to implement the National Action Plan which was prepared by the Federal Ministry of Labour under the stewardship of Omar Asghar Khan during his tenure.

His father, Asghar Khan, dedicated his 2005 book, "We've learnt nothing from history," to him and wrote, "dedicated to my son Omar Asghar Khan (1953-2002) who shared my values and my hopes."

Pakistani professor Pervez Hoodbhoy wrote:

"He, and the organisation he founded, Sungi, stood up resolutely to hostile maulvis opposed to education of girls and against the timber mafia in Hazara. As a member of Pervez Musharraf’s cabinet, he was a voice for the poor and disenfranchised. Omar’s achievements were extraordinary in a society so hostile to change and forward movement. He succeeded far better than most, with his unique mix of idealism and pragmatism. Many of us have our own reasons for being grateful to Omar."

In 2013, Tahir Qureshi of the International Union for Conservation of Nature said: "...there is no alternative livelihood for the approximately one million labourers across the country involved in the production of plastic bags, and lastly, ministers get changed around a lot and [this] seems to be the least important issue for the government. It was only the late Omer Asghar Khan who took the initiative and put a complete ban on black polythene bags".

== Published works ==
Omar wrote Chapter 2 of Nighat Said Khan's 1986 book, "Women's Involvement in the Industrial Sector in Punjab- Status and Prospects".

Omar Asghar Khan (1993). The Factors Behind the Coining of the Word Islamic Fundamentalism (PDF).

Omar Asghar Khan (22 October 1999). "WHEN WOMEN SPEAK OUT [in Pakistan]". The News International. Archived from the original on 2 June 2002.

Omar Asghar Khan (2001). "Critical Engagements: NGOs and The State". In Anita M. Weiss; S. Zulfiqar Gilani (eds.). Power and Civil Society in Pakistan. Oxford University Press. ISBN 978-0-19-579414-4.
