= Hydrocarbon Development Institute of Pakistan =

Institution situated in Pakistan

Hydrocarbon Development Institute of Pakistan, (HDIP), (ادارہ ترقیات ہائیڈرو کاربن) is based in Islamabad, Pakistan. The HDIP was established in 1975 by the Ministry of Petroleum and Natural Resources. HDIP works closely with the Ministry of Petroleum and Natural Resources. The Petroleum Institute of Pakistan (PIP) The PIP was established in 1963 to represents all the segments of the gas, oil and petroleum industry in Pakistan.

== See also ==
- Petroleum Institute of Pakistan
- Ministry of Petroleum and Natural Resources
- Oil and Gas Development Company
