= NA-17 Abbottabad-II =

Constituency of the National Assembly of Pakistan

- Constituency for the National Assembly of Pakistan
- Region: Lower Tanawal Tehsil and Abbottabad Tehsil (partly) including Abbottabad City, of Abbottabad District
- Electorate: 398,195

Current constituency
- Party: Pakistan Tehreek-e-Insaf
- Member: Ali Khan Jadoon
- Created from: NA-18 (Abbottabad-II)

NA-17 Abbottabad-II (این اے-17، ایبٹ آباد-٢) is a constituency for the National Assembly of Pakistan. The constituency was formerly known as NA-18 (Abbottabad-II) from 1977 to 2018. The name changed to NA-15 (Abbottabad-I) after the delimitation in 2018 and to NA-17 (Abbottabad-II) after the delimitation in 2022.

== Members of Parliament ==
=== 1977–2002: NA-18 Abbottabad-II ===
Election	Member	Party
1977	Maulana Mufti Mahmood	PNA
1985	Pir M. Sabir Shah	Independent
1988	Maulana Fazlur Rehman	JUI (F)
1990	Fazal Karim Kundi	IJI
1993	Maulana Fazlur Rehman	IJM
1997	Al-Haj Sardar Umar Farooq Khan	PML-N

=== 2002–2018: NA-18 Abbottabad-II ===
Election	Member	Party
2002	Sardar Muhammad Yaqoob	PML (Q)
2008	Murtaza Javid Abbasi	PML (N)
2013	Murtaza Javid Abbasi	PML (N)

=== 2018–2022: NA-15 Abbottabad-I ===
Election	Member	Party
2018	Murtaza Javed Abbasi	PML (N)

=== 2024–present: NA-17 Abbottabad-II ===
Election	Member	Party
2024	Ali Khan Jadoon	SIC

== Elections since 2002 ==
=== 2002 general election ===
2002 General Election: NA-18 (Abbottabad-II)
Party	Candidate	Votes	%	±%
PML-Q	Sardar Muhammad Yaqoob	36,826	32.28	
PML-N	Murtaza Javed Abbasi	32,527	28.51	
Independent	Nawabzada Jehangir Saeed Tanoli	19,784	17.34	
MMA	Qari Syed Abdul Rahim Shah	13,017	11.41	
National Alliance	Qazi Muhammad Azhar	6,145	5.39	
PAT	Muhammad Aurangzeb Choudhry	3,516	3.08	
Independent	Lt. Colonel Abdul Ghaffar Javid	2,145	1.88	
Independent	Naveed Ashraf Abbasi	120	0.11	
Majority		4,299	3.77	
Turnout		114,080	36.23	
PML(Q) gain from PML (N)				

A total of 3,200 votes were rejected.

=== 2008 general election ===
2008 General Election: NA-18 (Abbottabad-II)
Party	Candidate	Votes	%	±%
PML-N	Murtaza Javed Abbasi	72,586	49.32	+20.81
PML	Sardar Muhammad Yaqoob	35,480	24.11	
Independent	Choudry Faisal Zulfiqar Ali	18,146	12.33	
Independent	Sardar Muhammad Riaz Khan	8,209	5.58	
PPPP	Sardar Mushtaq Ahmed	5,992	4.07	
MMA	Qari Syed Abdul Rahim Shah	2,373	1.61	−9.80
Independent	Raja Khan	1,566	1.06	
Independent	Sakandar Azam	1,217	0.83	
Independent	Lt. Colonel Abdul Ghaffar Javid	728	0.49	−1.39
Independent	Muhammad Javed Abbasi	399	0.27	
Independent	Aurangzeb Nalota	335	0.23	
MQM	Nisar Ahmed Sultan Tanoli	154	0.10	
Majority		37,106	25.21	
Turnout		147,185	44.26	+8.03
PML(N) gain from PML (Q)				

A total of 3,843 votes were rejected.

=== 2013 general election ===
2013 General Election: NA-18 (Abbottabad-II)
Party	Candidate	Votes	%	±%
PML-N	Murtaza Javed Abbasi	69,839	38.45	−10.87
PTI	Sardar Muhammad Yaqoob	41,391	22.79	
Tehreek-e-Suba Hazara	Sardar Haider Zaman	36,571	20.14	
Independent	Sikandar Azam	11,865	6.53	
MDM	Syed Faisal Hussain Shah Gillani	9,309	5.12	
JI	Waheed Akhtar	6,805	3.74	
Independent (politician)	Rabia Gul	2,954	1.63	
JUI-F	Sardar Ibrar Khan	1,390	0.77	
Awami Muslim League Pakistan	Muhammad Rashid	1,036	0.57	
MQM	Shahid Akram	253	0.14	+0.04
Hazara Awami Ittehad Pakistan	Asad Javed Khan	214	0.12	
Majority		28,448	15.66	
Turnout		181,627	55.57	
Pakistan Muslim League (N) hold		Swing		

A total of 6,784 votes were rejected.

=== 2018 general election ===
General elections were held on 25 July 2018.

General election 2018: NA-15 (Abbottabad-I)
Party	Candidate	Votes	%	±%
PML(N)	Murtaza Javed Abbasi	95,340	39.42	▲0.97
PTI	Ali Asghar Khan	81,845	33.84	▲11.05
Others	Others (eleven candidates)	56,972	23.55	
Turnout		241,869	50.56	▼5.01
Rejected ballots		7,712	3.19	
Majority		13,495	5.58	
Registered electors		478,336		
PML(N) hold		Swing	▼5.04	

=== 2024 general election ===
General elections were held on 8 February 2024. Ali Khan Jadoon won the election with 97,366 votes.

General election 2024: NA-17 Abbottabad-II
Party	Candidate	Votes	%	±%
PTI	Ali Khan Jadoon (Note: Filed nomination papers as PTI candidate but ECP allowed him to run as an Independent)	97,366	56.21	▲22.37
PML(N)	Mahabat Khan	44,760	25.84	▼13.58
PPP	Saleem Shah	16,460	9.50	▲9.07
Others	Others (eight candidates)	14,642	8.45	
Turnout		177,230	44.51	▼6.05
Rejected ballots		4,002	2.26	
Majority		52,606	30.37	▲11.57
Registered electors		398,195		

== See also ==
- NA-16 Abbottabad-I
- NA-18 Haripur
