= Sardar Muhammad Yaqoob =

Pakistani politician (died 2021)

Deputy Speaker of the National Assembly of Pakistan
- In office 19 November 2002 – 15 November 2007

Member of the National Assembly of Pakistan
- In office 2002–2007

Personal details
- Party: Pakistan Muslim League (Q)

Sardar Muhammad Yaqoob (سردار محمد یعقوب; died 20 October 2021) was a Pakistani politician who served as 16th Deputy Speaker of the National Assembly of Pakistan from 19 November 2002 to 15 November 2007.
