= Petroleum Institute of Pakistan =

Petroleum Institute of Pakistan (PIP), (ادارۂ برائے تنظیمِ صنعتِ پیٹرولیم ، پاکستان) is based in Islamabad, Pakistan. The PIP was established in 1963 to represents all the segments of the gas and petroleum industry in Pakistan. PIP works closely with the Ministry of Petroleum and Natural Resources. The Hydrocarbon Development Institute of Pakistan (HDIP) is the national petroleum Research and Development (R&D) organization that coordinates with the PIP.

== See also ==
- Hydrocarbon Development Institute of Pakistan
- Ministry of Petroleum and Natural Resources
- Oil and Gas Development Company
