= Murtaza Javed Abbasi =

Pakistani politician

- مرتضی جاوید عباسی

Member of the National Assembly of Pakistan
- In office 13 August 2018 – 10 August 2023
- Constituency: NA-15 (Abbottabad-I)
- In office 17 March 2008 – 31 May 2018
- Constituency: NA-18 Abbottabad-II

18th Deputy Speaker of the National Assembly of Pakistan
- In office 3 June 2013 – 31 May 2018
- Speaker: Ayaz Sadiq
- Preceded by: Faisal Karim Kundi
- Succeeded by: Qasim Suri

Personal details
- Born: 15 March 1970 (age 56)
- Party: PMLN (2002-present)
- Parent: Javed Iqbal Abbasi (father)

Murtaza Javed Abbasi (Urdu: مرتضٰی جاوید عباسی; born 15 March 1970) is a Pakistani politician. He remained a member of the National Assembly from 2008 to May 2023. He is son of Haji Javed Iqbal Abbasi who was the former Member of the National Assembly (MNA), Senator and District Mayor of Abbottabad. Murtaza Javed Abbasi served as the 18th Deputy Speaker of the National Assembly, from June 2013 to May 2018. Abbasi has been a member of the National Assembly of Pakistan from August 2018 till August 2023. He served as federal minister for parliamentary affairs since 19 April 2022. He was also Chairman of the Anti-Narcotics committee from 2008 until 2013.

== Early life ==
He was born on 15 March 1970 to Javed Iqbal Abbasi in a Dhund Abbasi tribe.

== Political career ==
Abbasi ran for the seat of the National Assembly of Pakistan as a candidate of Pakistan Muslim League (N) (PML-N) from Constituency NA-18 Abbottabad-II in the 2002 Pakistani general election, but was unsuccessful. He received 32,527 votes and lost the seat to a candidate of Pakistan Muslim League (Q) (PML-Q).

Abassi was elected to the National Assembly as a candidate of PML-N from Constituency NA-18 Abbottabad-II in the 2008 Pakistani general election. He received 72,586 votes and defeated a candidate of PML-Q.

He was re-elected to the National Assembly as a candidate of PML-N from Constituency NA-18 Abbottabad-II in the 2013 Pakistani general election. He received 69,839 votes and defeated a candidate of Pakistan Tehreek-e-Insaf (PTI). In June 2013, Abbasi became 18th Deputy Speaker of the National Assembly of Pakistan.

He was re-elected to the National Assembly as a candidate of PML-N from Constituency NA-15 (Abbottabad-I) in the 2018 Pakistani general election. He received 95,340 votes and defeated Ali Asghar Khan, a candidate of PTI, in May 2022 Abbasi spoke of the ruling PTI national government saying their leadership was the "darkest period in history of the country."

However the following year he contested the 2023 general elections from Constituency NA-16 (Abbottabad-I). Despite Abbottabad being a traditional PML-N stronghold, Abbasi faced a significant defeat, securing 86,276 votes against 104,993 votes obtained by Ali Asghar Khan, an independent candidate backed by Pakistan Tehreek-e-Insaf (PTI) NA-16 Abbottabad-I. This marked a notable shift in the district's political landscape as PTI-supported independent candidates won all national and provincial assembly seats in Abbottabad, reflecting changing voter sentiments. This defeat was a significant setback for Abbasi and the PML-N in the region.
