= Central Cotton Research Institute =

Pakistani research institute

Coordinates: 30°08′45″N 71°26′12″E

Central Cotton Research Institute Multan, ( مرکزی ادارہ برائے تحقیقات و علوم نخ ) established in 1970 in Multan, Pakistan, is a research institute in Pakistan. The institute has many divisions dedicated to different aspects of cotton research including Agronomy, Breeding and Genetics, Cytogenetics, Physiology, Fiber Technology, Statistics and Agricultural Engineering.

== Cotton varieties ==
Sr. No.	Variety	Year of Release	Lint %age	Staple length (mm)	Micronaire (ug inch^{−1})	Strength (tppsi)
1.	CIM-70	1986	31.5	29.0	4.2	92.5
2.	CIM-109	1990	35.1	27.2	4.4	92.0
3.	CIM-240	1992	36.5	27.5	4.7	93.7
4.	CIM-1100	1996	38.0	29.0	3.9	94.0
5.	CIM-448	1996	38.0	28.5	4.5	93.8
6.	CIM-443	1998	36.7	27.6	4.9	96.0
7.	CIM-446	1998	36.2	27.0	4.7	97.4
8.	CIM-482	2000	39.2	28.5	4.5	98.0
9.	CIM-473	2002	39.7	29.6	4.3	95.2
10.	CIM-499	2003	40.2	29.6	4.4	97.3
11.	CIM-707	2004	38.1	32.2	4.2	97.5
12.	CIM-506	2004	38.5	28.7	4.5	98.9
13.	CIM-496	2005	41.1	29.7	4.6	93.5
14.	CIM-534	2006	40.1	29.0	4.5	97.2
15.	CIM-554	2009	41.5	28.5	4.7	96.8
16.	CIM-573	2012	39.3	31.6	4.7	92.5
17.	Bt. CIM-598	2012	41.8	29.0	4.4	94.8
18.	CIM-608	2013	41.1	28.5	4.6	93.9
19.	Bt. CIM-599	2013	40.3	30.2	4.6	96.3
20.	Bt. CIM-602	2013	38.0	29.5	4.8	95.0
21.	Cyto-124	2016	42.7	30.5	4.3	98.6
22.	CIM-620	2016	40.4	29.1	4.6	93.3
23.	Bt. Cyto-178	2016	40.8	29.0	4.3	105.2
24.	Bt. CIM-600	2017	42.8	28.8	4.6	96.7
25.	Bt. CIM-177	2017	40.8	29.0	4.3	105.2
26.	Bt. CIM-179	2017	40.2	28.2	4.2	107.6
27.	CIM-610	2018	40.2	28.8	4.3	101.9
28.	Bt. CIM-632	2018	41.6	28.8	4.3	100.4

== See also ==
- List of think tanks in India
- Central Institute for Cotton Research (India)
