= National Fertilizer Development Centre =

Pakistani government agency

The National Fertilizer Development Centre (NFDC) (Urdu: قومی مرکز برائے ترقیاتِ مخصبات) is a multidisciplinary research and development organisation in Pakistan, established by the federal Government in 1977. It operates under the Ministry of Planning Development & Reform, focusing on advancing the fertiliser sector through research, analysis, and development initiatives.

== Funding ==
After a brief period of aid from the United Nations Development Program, the NFDC has been assisted by the Food and Agriculture Organization with funds from the Norwegian Agency for Development Cooperation and Agricultural Economics Institute (LEI), Netherlands.

== International cooperation ==
NFDC has collaboration and shares information with:

- Food and Agriculture Organization
- Agricultural Economics Institute (LEI), Netherlands
- Fertilizer Advisory Development and Information Network for Asia and the Pacific
- International Fertilizer Industry Association
- Egyptian Fertilizer Development Centre (EFDC)
- International Potash Institute (IPI)
- Fertilizer Association, Cairo
- Fertilizer Association of India
- Fertilizer and Pesticide Authority, Manila, Philippines
- National Fertilizer Secretariat, Sri Lanka
- Arab Fertilizer Association, Cairo

== See also ==
- Planning Commission of Pakistan
- Agriculture in Pakistan
