= Area Study Center for Europe =

Pakistani autonomous research institute

Area Study Centre for Europe
- Established: 1975
- Focus: European history, literature, philosophy, politics, and the continent's relations with the rest of the world.
- Address: University of Karachi
- Location: Karachi, Pakistan
- Coordinates: 24°55′50″N 67°6′55″E
- Interactive map of Area Study Centre for Europe
- Website: http://www.asce-uok.edu.pk/

The Area Study Centre for Europe (ASCE) (علاقائی دانش گاہ برائے یورپ) is a federally funded autonomous research institute in Karachi. Academic oversight is provided by the University of Karachi. It was established in 1975.

== Programs ==
Area Study Centre for Europe offers M.S/ Ph.D. programme in European Studies. The Centre also offers certificate and diploma courses in English, French, and German.

== Events ==
Area Study Centre for Europe (ASCE) regularly organizes international seminars, workshops and conferences on various issues concerning Europe. ASCE arranges an international seminar each year in collaboration with Hanns Seidel Foundation (Germany).

The Centre also works with close co-operation of European Union Delegation to Pakistan. ASCE has also held several seminars and workshops with co-operation of European Union and Goethe- Institut Karachi.

== Publications ==
The research findings of the ASCE's own research staff are regularly published in the form of books, monographs and profiles. The Centre also publishes the bi-annual Journal of European Studies, with articles on contemporary European issues and related topics.

=== Books ===
Title of Book	Author	Year
Europe and the Muslim World: Coexistence or Conflict?	Shahid M. Amin	2012
Imperatives of Globalizations: Implications for Pakistan	Dr. Mahnaz Fatima	2001
Sir Thomas Roy And The Mughal Empire	Colin Paul Mitchell	2000
A Comprehensive Chronology Of Revolutionary Events in Eastern Europe And The Former Soviet Union 1989-1991	Dr. Rubab Hasan	1998
European Fine Arts and the Muslim World	Dr. Affan Seljuq	1996
Western Ethical Norms and Qur'anic Responses	Mr. Yusuf Abbas Hashmi	1994
The Soviet Role in South Asia (1969-1987)	Dr. Moonis Ahmar	1989
Superpower Rivalry in the Indian Ocean since the Withdrawal of Great Britain	Dr. Moonis Ahmar	1986

=== Indices ===
Title	Compiled by	Year
An Index of Articles in Aussen Politik 1985-1998	Aziz Ahmad & Tasneem Sultana	1999
Europe: An Index to Periodical Literature 1970-84	Shamim Zia	1985
Index to Periodical Literature 1984-86	Shamim Zia & Moonis Ahmar	1987

=== Profile Series ===
Title of Book	Author	Year
An Overview of 100 years of Norway as an Independent State (1905-2005)	Tasneem Sultana	2006
The Vicissitudes of the Palestinian Quest for Statehood and the European Union	Naveed Ahmad Tahir	2005
Indo-Russian Relations Since the Collapse of the Soviet Union	Naveed Ahmad Tahir	1999
The Expansion of the European Union: Problems & Prospects	Naveed Ahmad Tahir	1995
Muslim Rule in Spain	Dr. Affan Seljuq	1991
European Press; Tradition and Transition	M. Shamsuddin	1990
Sweden in Con-temporary World Politics	Naveed Ahmad Tahir	1990
Austria in World Affairs	Naveed Ahmad Tahir	1989
Turkey and the Super-powers	Rubab Hasan	1989
Pakistan-Italian Relations	Moonis Ahmar	1989
Finland: A Study in Neutrality	Naveed Ahmad Tahir	1987

=== Jean Monnet Project Papers ===
Title	Author	Year
The Post-September 11 Scenario And The European Union	Dr. Naveed Ahmad Tahir	2004
A Survey of EU-Pakistan Relations in the Contemporary Regional & International Setting: Political, Security, Economic and Development Aspects	Dr. Naveed Ahmad Tahir	2003
Integrationist and Cooperative Patterns in Europe and Asia	Dr. Naveed Ahmad Tahir	2002

== See also ==
- Higher Education Commission of Pakistan
- List of universities in Karachi
- Pakistan Educational Research Network
