= Pakistan Institute of Labor Education and Research =

Research institute founded in 1982

- Abbreviation: PILER
- Established: May 1, 1982; 44 years ago
- Type: Research institute
- Registration no.: 2848284-7
- Headquarters: 3, Sector X Gulshan-e-Maymar; Karachi, 75340
- Location: Pakistan
- Coordinates: 25.024646°N 67.123543°E
- Origins: Labour movement
- Services: Library, conference center, & hostel
- Methods: Training, workshops, & advocacy
- Field: Labour studies
- Subsidiaries: Rasheed Razvi Centre for Constitutional & Human Rights
- Affiliations: Clean Clothes Campaign, South Asia Labour Forum
- Website: piler.org.pk

Pakistan Institute of Labour Education & Research (PILER) was founded on 1 May 1982 by a group of concerned individuals from the trade union movement, academia and various other professions. Prominent among the founding members included Dr. Zaki Hassan, Nabi Ahmed, Muhammad Usman Baloch, Ghulam Kibria, Omer Asghar Khan, Karamat Ali, Anita Ghulam Ali and others.

The year 2000 was a landmark in the organisation's institutional history as PILER shifted from a small rented office to its own custom-designed building constructed on 2,385 square yards of land. Equipped with a hostel, conference hall, library, board meeting room, common room and dining hall, the spacious office—designed by the PILER's friend and well-known architect-activist-urban planner Arif Hasan—was built with the generous financial support from Stichting De Zaaier as well as contributions from PILER's international partners, local philanthropists, friends and well-wishers.

PILER is a Not-for-Profit company, registered with Securities and Exchange Commission of Pakistan, dedicated to promoting a democratic and effective labour movement for the overall advancement of a socially just and equitable society where the fundamental rights of people are respected and guaranteed.
