= Institute of Social and Policy Sciences =

Pakistani think tank

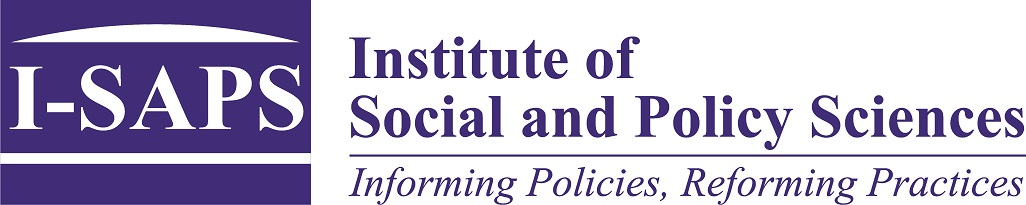
- I-SAPS Logo
- Formation: 2008
- Type: Think Tank
- Headquarters: M3Q3+JHV, G-8/1 G 8/1 G-8, Islamabad, Pakistan
- Executive Director: Salman Humayun
- Website: http://www.i-saps.org

The Institute of Social and Policy Sciences (سائنسی ادارہ برائے علومِ معاشرت و امورِ دانش) is a policy research and advocacy think tank with its headquarters located in Islamabad, Pakistan. The Institute also has offices in Lodhran and Mardan, Pakistan.

== History ==
The Institute was founded in 2008 and is governed by its board of directors. The Institute works in the fields of education, health, disaster risk reduction, governance, conflict and stabilization. Institute of Social and Policy Sciences (I-SAPS) emerged from Consumer Rights Commission of Pakistan; a consumer rights advocate organization.

Since its inception, I-SAPS has undertaken initiatives to improve access and quality of education and ensuring children's right to free and compulsory education in Pakistan. In this relation, I-SAPS started reporting education budgets in Pakistan in 2007-08. Each year, the Institute publishes its report on the state of education financing which analyzes the trends in education spending in Pakistan at Federal, provincial and district levels. The latest report in the series analyzed education budgets in Pakistan for a period of 2010-11 to 2015-16. I-SAPS has also facilitated the creation of Pakistan's National Caucus on Education with an aim to synergize the political and technical sides of education reforms in the country.

== Initiatives ==
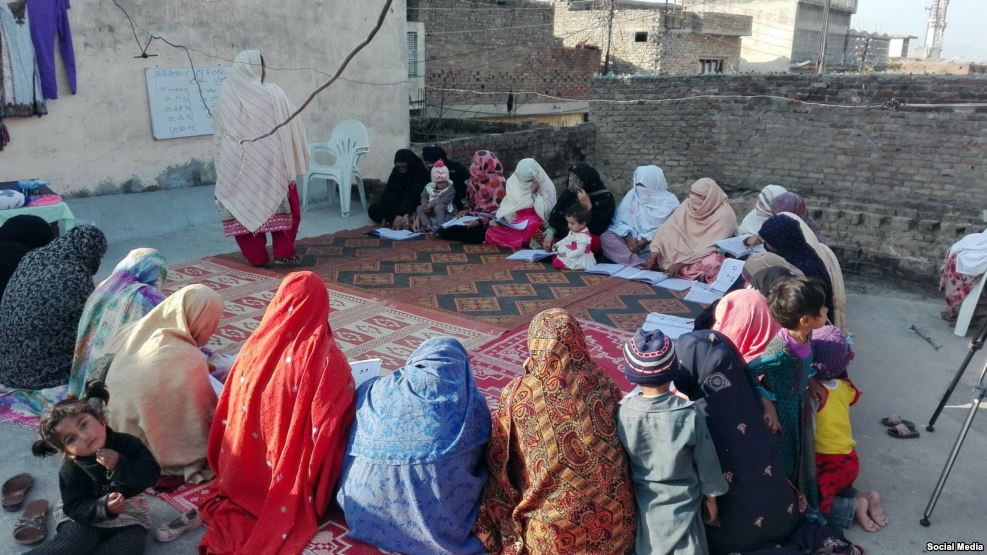
Adult Female Literacy Class in progress

In 2015, the Institute started working on adult literacy and has teamed up with Mobilink Foundation and GuarantCo for empowering the rural women in Khyber Pakhtunkhwa, Pakistan by providing them literacy skills. The initiative is being implemented in eight districts of Khyber Pakhtunkhwa including Mardan, Swabi, Nowshera, Buner, Malakand, Haripur, Mansehra and Kohat.

For the last many years, the Institute has been advocating for compensation of civilian victims of conflict and terrorism. I-SAPS has also promoted the need of an effective disaster risk management framework in Pakistan and has raised the issue of compensation of flood-affected communities on various forums.

In 2011, I-SAPS launched the Journal of Social and Policy Sciences, a double-blind peer-review research journal. The Journal publishes multi-disciplinary policy-oriented research especially media and society, trade policy and tax reforms, post-colonial societal changes, education and health sector policies and reforms focusing mainly on Pakistan and South Asia.

Since 2017, I-SAPS is implementing the "Sustainable Transition and Retention in Delivering Education (STRIDE)" program to address the transition and retention challenge for students at post-primary levels. STRIDE is being implemented in collaboration with the provincial governments of Punjab and Khyber Pakhtunkhwa in districts Bahawalpur, Kohat, Muzaffargarh and Swabi.
