= Abbottabad Public School =

- ایبٹ آباد پبلک سکول

Location
- Abbottabad, Khyber Pakhtunkhwa; Pakistan; 34°13′33″N 73°14′29″E

Information
- Other name: APS
- Former name: Railway Public School; Abbottabad Public School and College
- Type: Semi Government School
- Motto: "Character is Destiny" "Latin: character est clavis est victoria"
- Established: 1961; 65 years ago
- Founder: M.A Rehman
- Principal: Mr. Akhtar Ali Qureshi
- Enrollment: Over 80 enrollment per year
- Houses: Liaqat House; Iqbal House; Jinnah House; Sir Syed House; Nishtar House; Sardar Bahadur House; Sultan Tipu House; Rehman House
- Colors: Red and Blue
- Website: aps.edu.pk

Abbottabad Public School (APS) (Urdu: ایبٹ آباد پبلک سکول; Pashto: ایبټ اباد پبلک سکول), formerly Railway Public School and Abbottabad Public School and College, is a public, all boys, boarding school for 7th to 12th grade students, located in Abbottabad, Pakistan. APS follows the philosophy of the British boarding schools where academic rigour is balanced with a disciplined boarding life with activities ranging from intramural sports to debating and cultural events. Abbottabad Public School is located at an altitude of about 4500 feet.

== History ==
In 1957, Pakistan Railways opened up a school outside Abbottabad on official railways land 'donated' by Sardar Bahadur Khan, brother of General Ayub Khan from Haripur, Hazara. who later became the President of Pakistan. The school was called Railway Public School. After two years it was closed and then after a gap of one year, in April 1961, the school was renamed as Abbottabad Public School.

In 1986, Muhammad Zia-ul-Haq, the then President, renamed the institution as Abbottabad Public School & College. The School's Board of Governors, in its meeting on July 20, 2002, deleted the words "and College" and gave the institute its original name Abbottabad Public School. It is popularly known as APS and its alumni as Abbottonians. Abbottabad Public School had the word "College" attached to it sometime in the 90's. The founding Principal was Mr. M. A. Rahman.

The main campus is 10 km outside Abbottabad on the main Mansehra Road, that eventually becomes Karakoram Highway. It covers an area of about 55 acres (220,000 m^{2}). The school is surrounded by deep natural ravine in almost a U-shape. The only non-crevice side faces a high mountain. The Karakoram Highway passes between the school and the mountain.

The school offers high quality of education and discipline and the school motto "Character is destiny" which shows proper character building of students .

== Notable alumni ==
- Shaukat Aziz – former Prime Minister of Pakistan
- Nasir-ul-Mulk - former Chief Justice of Pakistan & Caretaker Prime Minister of Pakistan
- Ahmad Mukhtar – former Defence Minister of Pakistan
- Shehzad Arbab – former Chief Secretary, KP & Advisor to PM Imran Khan on Establishment
- Ahmad Saeed – CEO Servis Industries
- Major General Ameer Faisal Alvi – former GOC Special Service Group (SSG)
- Arbab Alamgir Khan – Former Federal Minister of Communications
- Omar Asghar Khan – former Federal Minister, founder of Sungei, PILER and SEBCON, and Qaumi Jamhoori Party
- Bilal Omar Khan - Major General
- Haider Ali Khan - MNA Pakistan Tehreek-e-Insaf
- Shafaat Ullah Shah - Lieutenant General (R)

== See also ==
- Army Burn Hall College
- Pakistan International Public School and College
