= Association of European Rarities Committees =

The Association of European Rarities Committees - also named Association of European Records and Rarities Committees - is a co-ordinating and liaison body for the bird rarities committees of Europe and other nearby countries.

It was created in 1993 at a meeting of European rarities committees on the German island of Heligoland.

The association's aims are as follows:

- Encourage the founding of a national rarities committee in every European country
- Provide help for national committees when requested to do so
- Prepare and maintain a European bird list
- Organize meetings of delegates of the national committees at approximately two-year intervals to maintain personal contact, information exchange and co-operation

For a list of AERC members, see List of the member committees of the Association of European Rarities Committees
