= Applied Economics Research Centre =

Research institute of University of Karachi

- Type: Public
- Established: 1973
- Director: Prof. Dr. Nooreen Mujahid
- Location: Karachi, Sindh, Pakistan
- Campus: University of Karachi
- Affiliations: Higher Education Commission (Pakistan)
- Website: aerc.edu.pk

The Applied Economics Research Centre (AERC; مرکز برائے تحقیق معاشیات اطلاقی) is a research institute of University of Karachi. It was established in 1973 by the Government of Sindh and financially assisted by Ford Foundation. Prof. Dr. Ehsan Rasheed, the distinguished alumni of Aligarh University and the son of noted scholar Rashid Ahmad Siddiqui, was the first founding Director of the AERC. Prof. Dr. Nooreen Mujahid is the present director of the institute

Initially there was only two-year post-master course of M.A.S. at AERC, but now it offers M.A.S, M.Phil., and Ph.D. courses. It has the largest economics research library in Pakistan and hold entire past publications of International Monetary Fund, World Bank, Asian Development Bank and State Bank of Pakistan.

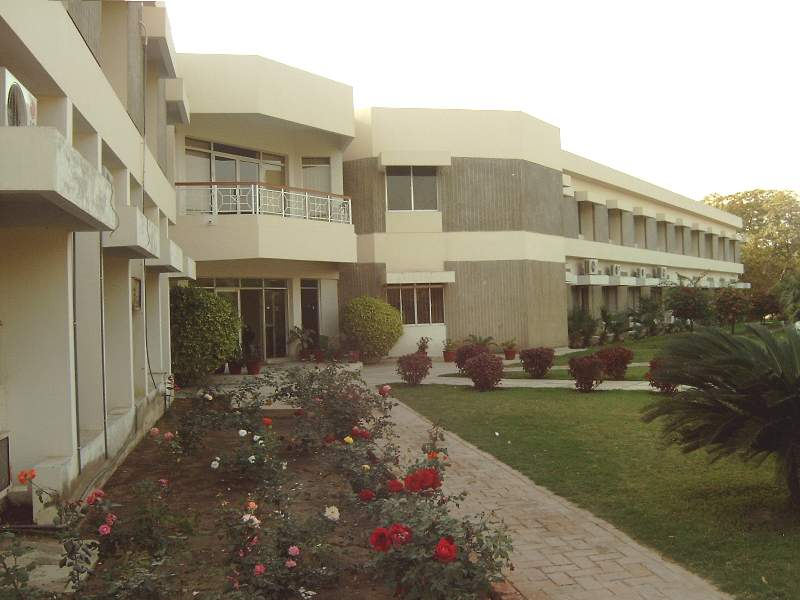
Applied Economics Research Centre

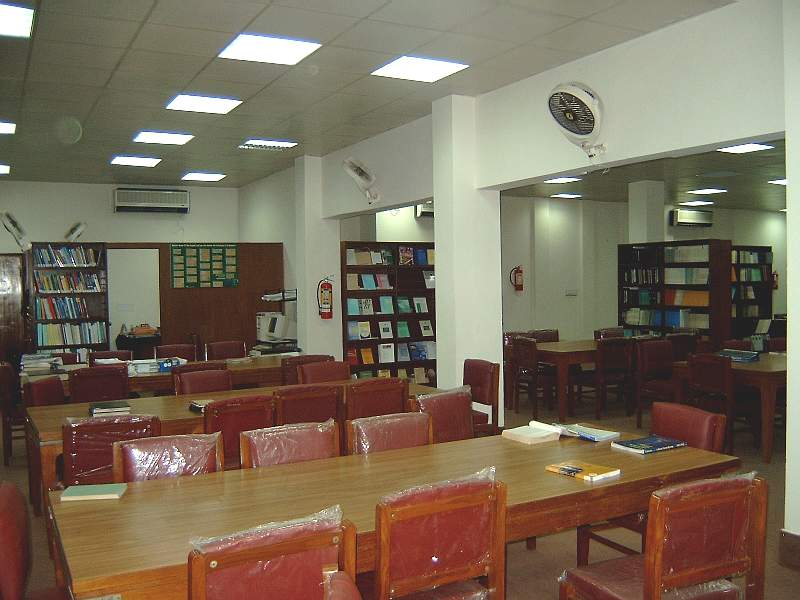
AERC Library

== See also ==
- List of universities in Karachi
- List of universities in Pakistan
- Economics
- History of economics
- List of economics topics
