= Ali Khan Jadoon =

Pakistani politician

Member of the National Assembly of Pakistan
- Incumbent
- Assumed office 29 February 2024
- Constituency: NA-17 Abbottabad-II
- In office 13 August 2018 – 20 January 2023
- Constituency: NA-16 (Abbottabad-II)

Personal details
- Party: PTI (2018-present)
- Parent: Amanullah Khan Jadoon (father)

Ali Khan Jadoon is a Pakistani politician who has been a member of the National Assembly of Pakistan since 29 February 2024 and previously served in this role from August 2018 till January 2023.

== Political career ==
He was elected as the nazim of Abbottabad district council in April 2018.

He was elected to the National Assembly of Pakistan as a candidate of Pakistan Tehreek-e-Insaf (PTI) from Constituency NA-16 (Abbottabad-II) in the 2018 Pakistani general election. He received 85,203 votes and defeated Malik Mohabbat Khan, a candidate of Pakistan Muslim League (N).
