= Javed Iqbal Abbasi =

Pakistani politician

Member of the Senate of Pakistan
- In office 1997–1999

Member of the National Assembly of Pakistan
- In office 1990–1993
- Constituency: NA-12 (Abbottabad)

Personal details
- Born: Seer Gharbi, Abbottabad District
- Party: Pakistan Muslim League (N)
- Children: Murtaza Javed Abbasi (son)

Haji Javed Iqbal Abbasi is a Pakistani politician and former senator. He had been member of the National Assembly of Pakistan from 1985 to 1988 and again from 1990 to 1993. Abbasi comes from Seer Gharbi in Abbottabad District, his father had owned a general store in Havelian, while his son Murtaza Javed Abbasi is also a politician.

== Political career ==
He was elected to the National Assembly of Pakistan as an independent candidate from NA-12 (Abbottabad) in the 1985 Pakistani general election.

He was re-elected the National Assembly of Pakistan as a candidate of Islami Jamhoori Ittehad from NA-12 (Abbottabad) in the 1990 Pakistani general election. He received 43,764 votes and defeated independent candidate Sardar Gul Khatab.

He became senator on the ticket of Pakistan Muslim League (Nawaz) (PML-N) in 1997 senate election.

After the 1999 Pakistani coup d'état he was arrested and jailed in August 2000 in Mushraf regime. He was also disqualified for 10 years for holding any public office.
