= NA-16 Abbottabad-I =

Constituency of the National Assembly of Pakistan

- Constituency for the National Assembly of Pakistan
- Region: Abbottabad Tehsil (partly), Havelian Tehsil and Lora Tehsil of Abbottabad District
- Electorate: 554,426

Current constituency
- Party: Independent
- Member: Ali Asghar Khan
- Created from: NA-17 (Abbottabad-I)

NA-16 Abbottabad-I (این اے-16، ایبٹ آباد-١) is a constituency for the National Assembly of Pakistan. The constituency was formerly known as NA-17 (Abbottabad-I) from 1977 to 2018. The name changed to NA-16 Abbottabad-II after the delimitation in 2018 and to NA-16 (Abbottabad-I) after the delimitation in 2022.

== Members of Parliament ==
=== 1977–2002: NA-17 (Abbottabad-I) ===
Election	Member	Party
1977	Haji Faqir M. Khan	PNA
1985	Ayub Khan Allai	Independent
1988	Fazle Haq	IJI
1990	Maulvi M. Amin	JUI (F)
1993	Malik Said Ahmed	Independent
1997	Aurangzeb	Independent

=== 2002–2018: NA-17 (Abbottabad-I) ===
Election	Member	Party
2002	Amanullah Khan Jadoon	PML (Q)
2008	Sardar Mehtab Ahmed Khan	PML (N)
2013	Dr Muhammad Azhar Khan Jadoon	PTI

=== 2018–2022: NA-16 Abbottabad-II ===
Election	Member	Party
2018	Ali Khan Jadoon	PTI

=== 2024–present: NA-16 Abbottabad-I ===
Election	Member	Party
2024	Ali Asghar Khan	IND

== Elections since 2002 ==
=== 2002 general election ===
2002 General Election: NA-17 (Abbottabad-I)
Party	Candidate	Votes	%	±%
PML-Q	Amanullah Khan Jadoon	44,716	40.92	
Independent	Muhammad Azhar Jadoon	30,949	28.33	
MMA	Al-Haj Habib-ur-Rehman Abbasi	21,383	19.57	
Qaumi Jamhoori Party	Ali Asghar Khan	4,687	4.29	
PPPP	Sardar Ibrar Ahmad	3,646	3.34	
Hazara Qaumi Mahaz	Asif Malik Advocate	3,384	3.10	
Independent	Syed Ejaz Hussain Shah	489	0.45	
Majority		13,767	12.59	
Turnout		109,254	39.62	
PML(Q) gain from Independent				

A total of 3,375 votes were rejected.

=== 2008 general election ===
2008 General Election: NA-17 (Abbottabad-I)
Party	Candidate	Votes	%	±%
PML-N	Sardar Mehtab Ahmed Khan	58,041	44.07	
Independent	Muhammad Azhar Jadoon	36,668	27.84	−0.49
PML	Amanullah Khan Jadoon	34,947	26.53	
MMA	Professor Raja Aurangzeb Khan	1,465	1.11	−18.46
MQM	Ghulam Mustafa Sumsam Qureshi	589	0.45	
Majority		21,373	16.23	
Turnout		131,710	42.72	+3.10
PML(N) gain from PML (Q)				

A total of 2,681 votes were rejected.

=== 2013 general election ===
2013 General Election: NA-17 (Abbottabad-I)
Party	Candidate	Votes	%	±%
PTI	Muhammad Azhar Jadoon	96,549	51.42	
PML-N	Sardar Mehtab Ahmed Khan	69,721	37.13	−6.94
Independent	Ayaz Khan Jadoon	8,349	4.45	−23.39
JI	Habib ur Rehman Abbasi	4,408	2.35	
JUI-F	Tariq Sultan	3,504	1.87	
Tehreek-e-Suba Hazara	Fida Hussain	2,076	1.11	
PPPP	Sardar Muhammad Gulzar Abbasi	1,107	0.59	
PML (S)	Safdar Zaman	890	0.47	
MQM	Sarfaraz Khan	526	0.28	−0.17
TTP	Raja Izat Ali	340	0.18	
Independent	Zahoor Ahmed Chaudry	283	0.15	
Majority		26,828	14.29	
Turnout		187,753	56.48	+13.76
PTI gain from PML (N)				

A total of 3,932 votes were rejected.

=== 2018 general election ===
General elections were held on 25 July 2018.

General election 2018: NA-16 (Abbottabad-II)
Party	Candidate	Votes	%	±%
PTI	Ali Khan Jadoon	85,203	48.62	▼2.80
PML(N)	Mahabat Khan	54,879	31.32	▼5.81
Others	Others (sixteen candidates)	35,146	20.06	
Turnout		179,604	49.84	▼6.64
Rejected ballots		4,376	2.43	
Majority		30,324	16.88	
Registered electors		360,392		
PTI hold		Swing	N/A	

=== 2024 general election ===
General elections were held on 8 February 2024. Ali Asghar Khan won the election with 105,300 votes.

General election 2024: NA-16 (Abbottabad-I)
Party	Candidate	Votes	%	±%
PTI	Ali Asghar Khan (Note: Filed nomination papers as PTI candidate but ECP allowed him to run as an Independent)	105,300	43.52	▼5.10
PML(N)	Murtaza Javed Abbasi	86,621	35.80	▼4.48
Independent	Mehtab Abbasi	23,566	9.74	N/A
Others	Others (fourteen candidates)	26,461	10.94	
Turnout		249,295	44.96	▼4.88
Rejected ballots		7,347	2.95	
Majority		18,679	7.72	▼9.16
Registered electors		554,426		

== See also ==
- NA-15 Mansehra-cum-Torghar
- NA-17 Abbottabad-II
