= Chaudhry Wajahat Hussain =

Pakistani politician

Member of the National Assembly of Pakistan
- In office 2002–2013
- Constituency: NA-104 (Gujrat-I)

Personal details
- Born: Gujrat, Punjab, Pakistan
- Party: PART (2026-present)
- Other political affiliations: PTI (2018-2023); PML(Q) (2023-2025)
- Parent: Chaudhry Zahoor Elahi (father)
- Relatives: See Chaudhry family
- Education: Aitchison College Lahiore; George Washington University
- Profession: Businessman, Politician

Chaudhry Wajahat Hussain (Urdu: چوہدری وجاہت حسین; born c. 1950) is a Pakistani politician who had been a member of the National Assembly of Pakistan from 2002 to 2013. In 2023, he was appointed as the president of PML-Q after his brother Chaudhry Shujaat Hussain was removed from the position by a breakaway faction. Later, Election Commission of Pakistan reverted the decision and stated it an illegal move. Also given all powers back to Chaudhry Shujaat Hussain. He was member of Pakistan Tehreek e Insaf until he announced going back to Shujaat's PML-Q.

== Early life and education ==
Chaudhry Wajahat Hussain, also known as "Commander Gujrat", the son of Chaudhry Zahoor Elahi, was born in 1950 in Gujrat. He is a graduate of George Washington University in USA where he completed a bachelor's degree in Political Science. For his primary and high school, he attended the Aitchison College Lahore, where many Pakistani businessmen and politicians have attended.

Hussain is the brother of former Prime Minister of Pakistan, Shujaat Hussain, and the uncle of Ministers Moonis Elahi, Shafay Hussain and Chaudhry Salik Hussain. His cousin and brother-in-law Parvez Elahi served as the Deputy Prime Minister of Pakistan and the Chief Minister of Punjab twice.

== Political career ==
He was elected to the National Assembly of Pakistan from Constituency NA-104 (Gujrat-I) as a candidate of Pakistan Muslim League (Q) (PML-Q) in the 2002 Pakistani general election. He received 82,126 votes and defeated Nawabzada Ghazanfar Ali Gul. In the same election, he also ran for the seat of the National Assembly from Constituency NA-105 (Gujrat-II) as an independent candidate but was unsuccessful. He received 1,061 votes and lost the seat to Shujaat Hussain.

He was re-elected to the National Assembly from Constituency NA-104 (Gujrat-I) as a candidate of PML-Q in the 2008 Pakistani general election. He received 96,379 votes and defeated Nawabzada Ghazanfar Ali Gul. On 3 May 2011, he was inducted into the federal cabinet of Prime Minister Yousaf Raza Gillani and was appointed as Federal Minister for Overseas Pakistanis where he served until 15 May 2011. On 16 May, he was made Federal Minister for Labour and Manpower where he served until 30 June 2011. From 1 July to 29 July, he remained in the federal cabinet with the status of a federal minister without any portfolio. On 30 July, he was appointed as Federal Minister for Human Resource Development where he continued to serve until June 2012. In June 2012, he was inducted into the federal cabinet of Prime Minister Raja Pervaiz Ashraf and was appointed as Federal Minister for Human Resource Development where he served until May 2013.

He ran for the seat of the National Assembly from Constituency NA-104 (Gujrat-I) as a candidate of PML-Q in the 2013 Pakistani general election but was unsuccessful. He received 81,231 votes and lost the seat to Nawabzada Mazhar Ali.

On 26 January 2023, he was appointed the as the president of PML-Q after his brother Chaudhry Shujaat Hussain was removed from the position by a breakaway faction which terminated the Chaudhry Shujaat Hussain's party membership for party rules violations. But later the Election Commission announced that Chaudhary Shujaat Hussain will remain president of the Pakistan Muslim League-Quaid (PML-Q). On 22 May 2023, Chaudhary Wajahat Hussain announced returning to PML-Q.

== Personal life ==
He is married to the daughter of Late Senator, Akhtar Nawaz Khan, and the sister of Member of the National Assembly of Pakistan (MNA), Babar Nawaz Khan. He is the father of MNA Chaudhry Hussain Elahi and Member of the Provincial Assembly of Punjab (MPA), Chaudhry Musa Elahi.
