= NA-64 Gujrat-III =

Constituency of the National Assembly of Pakistan

- Constituency for the National Assembly of Pakistan
- Region: Gujrat City and Kunjah Tehsil (partly) of Gujrat District
- Electorate: 551,624

Current constituency
- Party: Pakistan Muslim League (Q)
- Member: Chaudhry Salik Hussain
- Created from: NA-105 Gujrat-II

NA-64 Gujrat-III (این اے-64، گجرات-3) is a constituency for the National Assembly of Pakistan.

== Members of Parliament ==
=== 2018–2023: NA-69 Gujrat-II ===
Election	Member	Party
2018	Chaudhry Pervaiz Elahi	PML (Q)
By-election 2018	Moonis Elahi	PML (Q)

=== 2024–present: NA-64 Gujrat-III ===
Election	Member	Party
2024	Chaudhry Salik Hussain	PML (Q)

== Election 2002 ==
General elections were held on 10 October 2002. Chaudhry Shujaat Hussain of PML-Q won by 66,809 votes.

General election 2002: NA-105 Gujrat-II
Party	Candidate	Votes	%	±%
PML(Q)	Ch. Shujat Hussain	66,809	49.41	
PPP	Ch. Ahmad Mukhtar	52,632	38.93	
MMA	Amjad Shaheen Warriach	6,819	5.04	
PAT	Dr. Mahmood-UI-Hassan Kunjahi	6,818	5.04	
Others	Others (three candidates)	2,130	1.58	
Turnout		138,588	47.41	
Total valid votes		135,208	97.56	
Rejected ballots		3,380	2.44	
Majority		14,177	10.48	
Registered electors		292,310		

== Election 2008 ==
General elections were held on 18 February 2008. Chaudhry Ahmed Mukhtar of PPP won by 79,735 votes.

General election 2008: NA-105 Gujrat-II
Party	Candidate	Votes	%	±%
PPP	Ch. Ahmad Mukhtar	79,735	54.55	
PML(Q)	Ch. Shujat Hussain	65,738	44.97	
Others	Others (two candidates)	706	0.48	
Turnout		149,187	45.08	
Total valid votes		146,179	97.98	
Rejected ballots		3,638	2.02	
Majority		13,997	9.58	
Registered electors		332,332		
PPP gain from PML(Q)				

== Election 2013 ==
General elections were held on 11 May 2013. Chaudhary Pervez Elahi of PML-Q won by 78,171 votes and became the member of National Assembly.

General election 2013: NA-105 Gujrat-II
Party	Candidate	Votes	%	±%
PML(Q)	Parvez Elahi	78,171	39.10	
PML(N)	Ch. Mubashir Hussain	64,796	32.41	
PTI	Muhammad Afzal Gondal	40,094	20.06	
PPP	Ch. Ahmad Mukhtar	10,826	5.42	
Others	Others (twenty candidates)	6,031	3.01	
Turnout		204,410	51.87	
Total valid votes		199,918	97.80	
Rejected ballots		4,492	2.20	
Majority		13,375	6.69	
Registered electors		394,060		
PML(Q) hold				

== Election 2018 ==
General elections were held on 25 July 2018. Chaudhry Pervaiz Elahi of Pakistan Muslim League (Q) won the election but vacated this constituency in favor of speakership of Punjab Assembly.

General election 2018: NA-69 Gujrat-II
Party	Candidate	Votes	%	±%
PML(Q)	Parvez Elahi	122,336	57.50	
PML(N)	Chaudhary Mubashir Hussain	49,295	23.17	
TLP	Raja Salamat Ali	27,791	13.06	
Others	Others (ten candidates)	13,348	6.27	
Turnout		217,800	46.60	
Total valid votes		212,770	97.69	
Rejected ballots		5,030	2.31	
Majority		73,041	34.33	
Registered electors		467,378		
PML(Q) hold		Swing	N/A	

== By-election 2018 ==
By-elections were held in this constituency on 14 October 2018.

By-election 2018: NA-69 Gujrat-II
Party	Candidate	Votes	%	±%
PML(Q)	Moonis Elahi	65,759	68.98	▲11.48
PML(N)	Imran Zafar	14,956	15.69	▼7.48
Others	Others (nine candidates)	14,618	15.33	
Turnout		97,623	20.81	▼25.79
Total valid votes		95,333	97.65	▼0.04
Rejected ballots		2,290	2.35	▲0.04
Majority		50,803	53.29	▲18.96
Registered electors		469,177		
PML(Q) hold		Swing	▲9.48	

== Election 2024 ==
General elections were held on 8 February 2024. Chaudhry Salik Hussain won the election with 100,379 votes.

General election 2024: NA-64 Gujrat-III
Party	Candidate	Votes	%	±%
PML(Q)	Chaudhry Salik Hussain	100,379	44.92	▼24.06
PTI	Qaisara Elahi (Note: Filed nomination papers as PTI candidate but ECP allowed her to run as an Independent)	89,795	40.18	N/A
TLP	Chaudhry Abdul Karim	22,197	9.93	▲3.69
Others	Others (fifteen candidates)	11,085	4.96	
Turnout		226,911	41.14	▲20.33
Total valid votes		223,456	98.48	
Rejected ballots		3,455	1.52	
Majority		10,584	4.74	▼48.55
Registered electors		551,624		
PML(Q) hold				

== See also ==
- NA-63 Gujrat-II
- NA-65 Gujrat-IV
