= Chaudhry Zahoor Elahi =

Pakistani politician (1917–1981)

Member of National Assembly of Pakistan
- In office 1972–1977
- Constituency: NW-35 (Gujrat-I)
- In office 8 June 1962 – 1964
- Constituency: NW-23 (Gujrat-I)

Personal details
- Born: Zahoor Elahi; 1917 Gujrat, Punjab, British India
- Died: September 25, 1981 (aged 63–64)
- Cause of death: Assassination
- Party: Pakistan Muslim League
- Children: 3, including: Chaudhry Shujaat Hussain, (son); Chaudhry Wajahat Hussain (son)
- Relatives: see Chaudhry family
- Occupation: Politician

Chaudhry Zahoor Elahi (Urdu: چوہدری ظہور الٰہی, 1917 – 25 September 1981) was a Pakistani politician from Gujrat, Punjab, British India (which became Gujrat, Pakistan).

A Jat of the Warraich clan, Elahi began his career as a police constable. After the creation of Pakistan in 1947, he retired from the police force and joined his elder brother, Chaudhry Manzoor Elahi, in a textile engineering venture. The brothers jointly purchased and operated a textile mill in Gujrat.

Elahi entered local politics in the 1950s. During Ayub Khan's rule, he became a political opponent of the Nawab of Kalabagh, Amir Mohammad Khan, the governor of West Pakistan. As the Secretary-General of the Convention Muslim League, he opposed Bhutto and was imprisoned, During their conflict, his family property was also confiscated by the government.

Chaudhry Zahoor Elahi was assassinated in Lahore in 1981 by Razaq Jharna, a member of Al-Zulfikar, an organization led by Murtaza Bhutto.

== Early life ==
Chaudhry Zahoor Elahi was the son of Chaudhry Sardar Khan Warraich. Zahoor Elahi's elder brother, Chaudhry Manzoor Elahi, was the father of Chaudhry Pervaiz Elahi, a former chief minister of Punjab. Zahoor Elahi was raised in Gujrat. Before entering politics, he was a police constable.

== Business ==
Upon his return from Amritsar, Chaudhry Zahoor Elahi joined his elder brother, Chaudhry Manzoor Elahi, in developing a family-owned textile business in Gujrat. After Pakistan's independence in 1947, the two brothers established two textile units under the names of Gujrat Silk Mills and Pakistan Textile Mills. In 1950, the business expanded to Lahore, where they established Parvez Textile Mills, specializing in weaving, finishing, and dyeing. In 1951–52, Chaudhry Manzoor Elahi traveled to Japan to import textile machinery for the Gujrat and Lahore units. The family also established Modern Flour Mills in Lahore and Rawalpindi.

== Early political career ==
In 1956, Chaudhry Zahoor Elahi entered politics while Chaudhry Manzoor Elahi managed the family business. Chaudhry Zahoor Elahi was elected Chairman of the Gujrat District Board in 1958 and was also elected as a director of the National Bank of Pakistan, a position he held for 12 years.

In 1958, General Ayub Khan imposed martial law and enforced the Elected Bodies Disqualification Order (EBDO), which was used to disqualify politicians for the next five years. Politicians facing EBDO could retire voluntarily from politics or face government action. Chaudhry Zahoor Elahi challenged the EBDO law. Despite being cleared of all charges by the EBDO Tribunal, he was sentenced to six months imprisonment. He was elected Member of the National Assembly in 1962 and subsequently became Secretary General of the Pakistan Muslim League's Parliamentary Party of United Pakistan. Around this time, the family also purchased the English daily newspaper, Pakistan Times, published from West Pakistan.

== 1970s ==
Elahi was elected to the National Assembly in 1970, as one of the few members of the Pakistan Muslim League elected in those elections. Following the fall of East Pakistan in 1971, Zulfikar Ali Bhutto became the new leader of Pakistan. After coming to power, Bhutto nationalized all major industries, including flour mills. Chaudhry Zahoor Elahi was among the nine opposition parliamentary leaders who were removed from the Parliament House on Bhutto's orders. He faced legal actions and was implicated in several cases during Bhutto's rule, including alleged buffalo theft and the alleged supply of Iraqi arms to rebels in Balochistan.

He was arrested for delivering an anti-government speech at the Hotel Intercontinental in Karachi, and a special tribunal sentenced him to five years imprisonment. He remained imprisoned in different jails, mostly at the Karachi jail.

The Pakistan National Alliance (PNA) gained momentum after 1977, and major PNA leaders, including Chaudhry Zahoor Elahi, were arrested. Elahi and others were released when General Zia-ul-Haq overthrew Bhutto's government in a military coup on July 5, 1977. General Zia ul Haq announced fresh elections within 90 days. Chaudhry Zahoor Elahi filed his nomination papers from Gujrat and Constituency No.3 of Lahore, where Z. A. Bhutto had also declared his candidacy. However, these elections were postponed when General Zia-ul-Haq arrested Bhutto.

Due to the deteriorating financial state of the nationalized industries, the Zia government decided to return them to their original owners, and the Chaudhry family took charge of their previously nationalized flour mills.

== 1980s ==
Following General Zia's actions against the Bhutto family, Murtaza Bhutto formed Al-Zulfikar. Ghulam Mustafa Khar, who was living in exile in London, reportedly informed a close associate of Chaudhry Zahoor Elahi of Al-Zulfikar's plot to assassinate him. Chaudhry Zahoor Elahi was assassinated in Lahore in September 1981, becoming one of the early victims of Al-Zulfikar. Murtaza Bhutto publicly accepted responsibility for the assassination in an interview with the BBC.

Shujaat Hussain and Chaudhry Pervaiz Elahi (sons of Chaudhry Zahoor Elahi and Chaudhry Manzoor Elahi, respectively) took charge of the family business and entered politics.

== Family ==
- Chaudhry Shujaat Hussain, son, former Prime Minister of Pakistan in 2004
- Chaudhry Wajahat Hussain, son
- Chaudhry Shafaat Hussain, son
- Chaudhry Pervaiz Elahi, nephew (son of elder brother Chaudhry Manzoor Elahi), Former Chief Minister of Punjab (Pakistan) from 2002 to 2007, First Deputy Prime Minister of Pakistan from 2012 to 2013
- Moonis Elahi, (MNA) grandson (son of Chaudhry Pervaiz Elahi)
- Hussain Elahi (MNA) grandson (son of Chaudhry Wajahat Hussain)
- Mussa Elahi, grandson (son of Chaudhry Wajahat Hussain)
- Salik Hussain (MNA) grandson (son of Chaudhry Shujaat Hussain)
