= Anwar Masood =

Pakistani poet (born 1935)

- انورمسعود
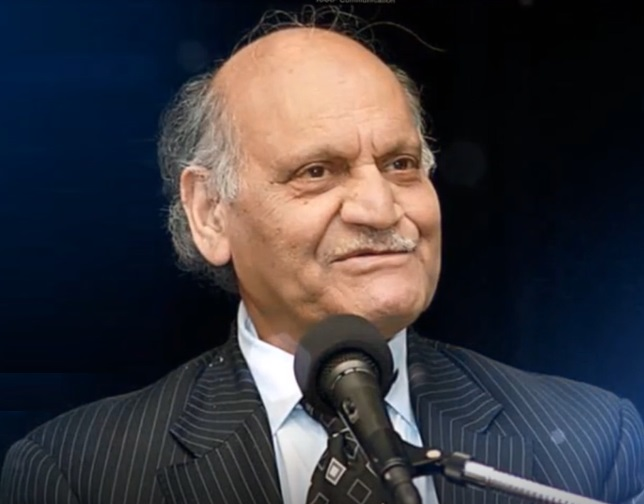
- Born: 8 November 1935 (age 90); Gujrat, Punjab, British India (present day Punjab, Pakistan)
- Citizenship: Pakistan
- Education: Government Zamindar College, Gujrat; Government College, Lahore; University of the Punjab; Oriental College
- Occupations: Poet; writer; educationist
- Spouse: Siddiqa Anwar (m. 1965; died 2020)
- Writing career
- Pen name: Masood
- Language: Punjabi; Urdu; Persian
- Period: Post-colonial era
- Genres: Humour; sentimentalism
- Notable work: Ambri
- Notable awards: Hilal-i-Imtiaz

Anwar Masood (Punjabi: انورمسعود, pronounced [ənʋəɾ məˈsuːd]; born 8 November 1935) is a Pakistani poet and educationist primarily known for his comic Punjabi poetry. His works include a wide variety of genres including humour, sentimentalism and literary criticism. He predominantly writes in Punjabi, and Urdu, but in Persian as well.

His poetry is known for the unique use of everyday, commonplace phrases and wording that is instantly relatable for masses in the region. Numerous of his Punjabi lines and phrases have actually become figures of speech in everyday conversations. The most prominent feature of his expression is the poignant undertones of his humorous verse, making his poetry one of its kind. The nuance of tragedy in his poems is a reflection of social injustice, discrimination, and personal misfortunes of his characters. This is why he himself commented: "قہقہ وہ ہے جسے نچوڑیں تو آنسو ٹپکیں" (Real laughter is one that sheds tears when squeezed).

He was awarded the Hilale Imtiaz Civil in 2024. He was awarded the Pride of Performance in 1999.

== Early life and education ==
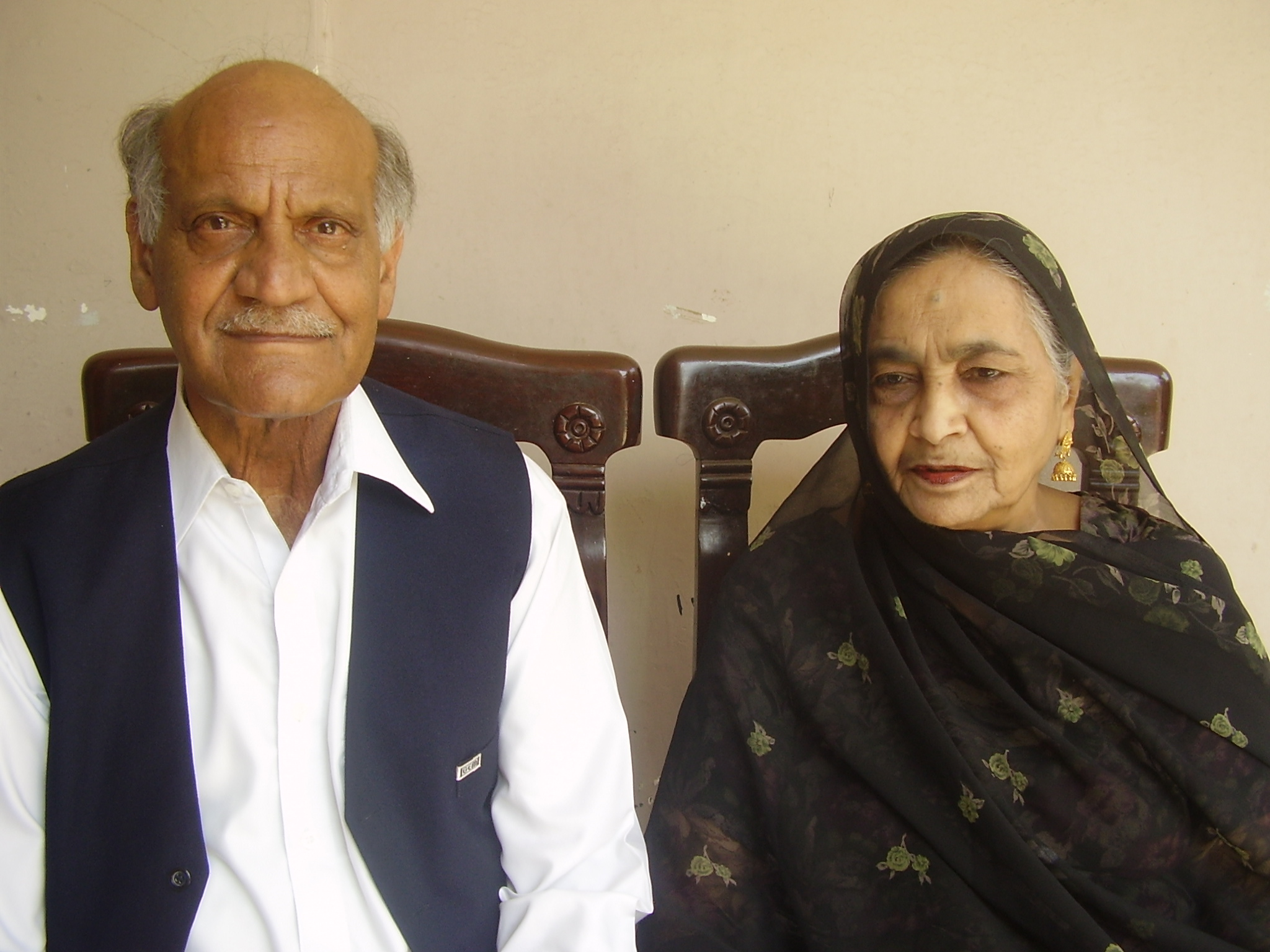
Anwar Masood and Siddiqa Anwar

Anwar Masood was born on 8 November 1935 into an Arain family in Gujrat, Punjab, Pakistan. He received his elementary education in Gujrat and Lahore, Pakistan. His father Muhammad Azeem Arain moved to Lahore a few years before the partition in 1947. After his elementary education in Gujrat and Lahore, he attended Watan High School on Brandreth Road, Lahore. Just before partition, the family moved back to Gujrat. It was here in the Public High School, Gujrat that Masood took his matriculation examination and passed his Secondary School Examination with distinction in 1952.

Conceding to the parents’ will to become a doctor, he took admission in FSc. Pre-Medical in Zamindaar College, Gujrat. However, science was not his area of interest. So two years later, he again started his FA and earned a scholarship. He earned his Bachelor of Arts degree in 1958, with distinction, topping the college and earning a scholarship and winning a spot on the Roll of Honor list. His subjects in BA were History, Urdu Literature, Persian and English.

Due to domestic problems, he could not start his master's degree program right away and started teaching at Government Islamia High School in Kunjah, Punjab. He finally finished his master's degree from the Oriental College, Punjab University in 1961.

In fact, he became a gold medalist in MA Persian and topped in University of the Punjab exams. He retired from the teaching profession in 1996.

Masood married his former classmate Qudrat Ilahi Siddiqa in 1965. His wife also taught Persian at Government College, 6th Road Rawalpindi. Together they have five children: three sons and two daughters: Muhammad Aqib, Muhammad Ammar Masood, Muhammad Jawad Azfar, Adeela Rashid, and Leenah Hashir.

== Poetry ==
Masood is a multilingual poet of Urdu, Persian, and Punjabi. His poetry gives the message of the original and pure culture of Pakistan. Masood is a unique poet who is popular among the masses. The way he has described the different aspects of life and culture in his poetry have never been described before. Some of his poems are so popular that wherever he goes in the world, people like to listen to them again and again. Some of his famous poems are "Anar Kali Diyan Shanan", "Aj Kee Pakaeay", "Banyan", "Juma Bazaar", "Jehlum Dey Pul Tey", "Hun Ki Karye", "Mela Akhian Da", "Ambri" and many others. Masood has performed and given live recitations of his poetry among many international communities and is popular worldwide.

Students: Over the span of the last 5 decades, Anwar Masood has had several scholastic students learning Persian, Poetry, Radeef, Translation of Old Scholarly Articles, etc. He has been mentoring only up to 2 students at a time and his current students are Muhammad Ali Abbas and Arqam Shah. Muhammad Ali Abbas is known for composing poetry and learning Persian under Masood's mentorship, and amongst Ali's popular works is "Aurat Ki Nami" translated into "Women's Warmth" in English. Ali Abbas is also adept at documenting the latent cultures within Pakistan and is constantly occupied with such journalistic endeavors during his travels, for Mushairas, across Pakistan with Anwar Masood. On the other hand, Arqam is beginner in the field of poetry and is currently learning Persian Poetic genres and stylistic distinctions.

A poem reviewer once said about him, "He is a poet that has the rare gift of being able to take a very serious subject and make it light and entertaining". He is a great command of covering all aspects of the topic or subject.

=== Famous poems ===
- چاء تے لسی (Tea and curd milk, it is a metaphor for two different civilizations)
- آج کی پکائیے (What should we cook today)
- امبڑی (Mother, a heart touching story of a student who used to beat his mother)
- جہلم دا پُل (Jehlum bridge)

== Books and publications ==
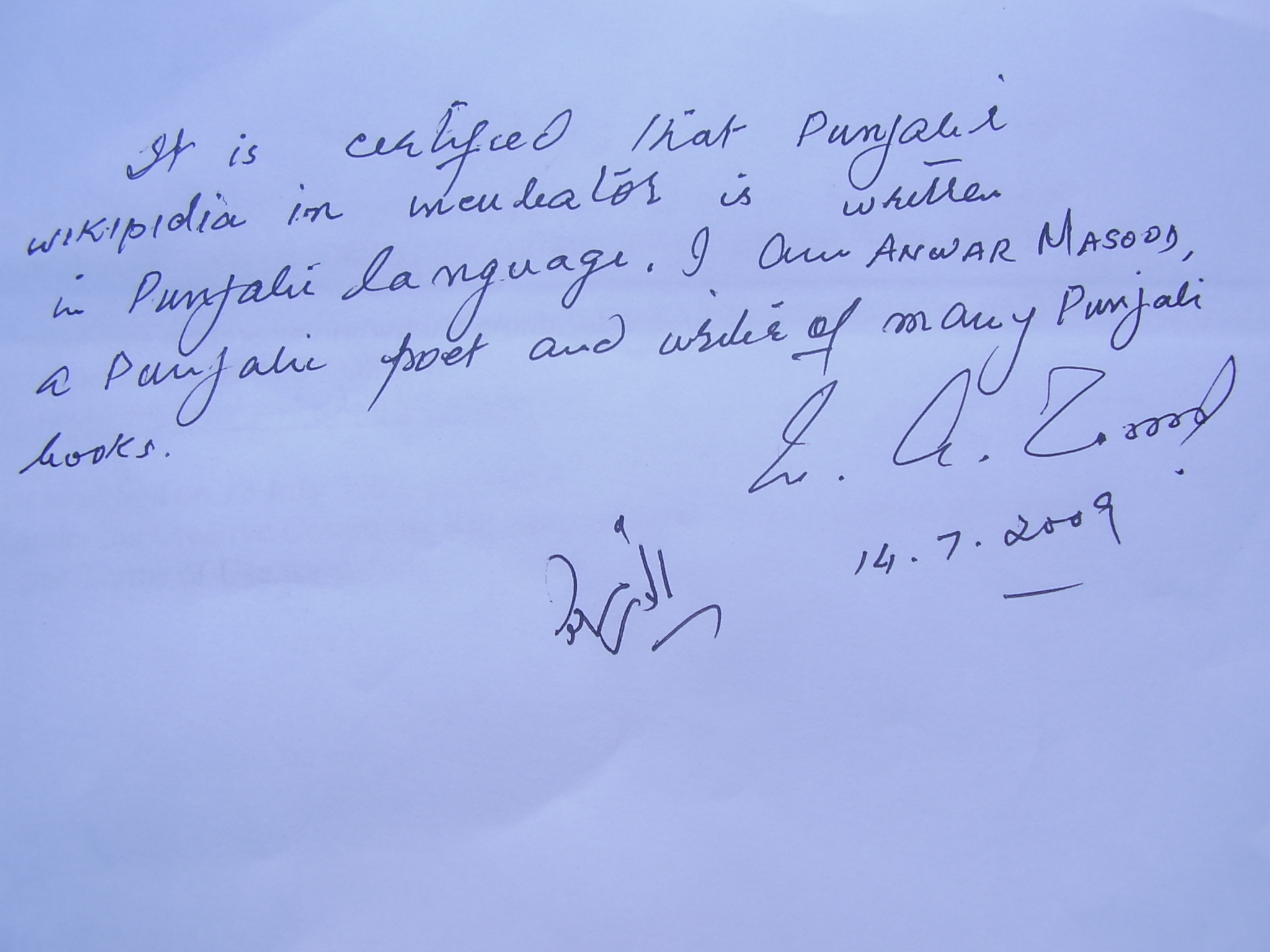
Masood certifying the launch of the Western Punjabi Wikipedia

- Mela Akhiyan Da (Punjabi poetry, includes "Ambri", published in 1974)
- Hun Ki Kariye (Punjabi poetry)
- Qataa Kalami (Urdu poetry)
- Ek Dareecha, Ek Chiragh (Urdu poetry)
- Shaakh-e-Tabassum (Essays on humorous poets)
- Darpesh (Humorous Poetry)
- Taqreeb (Anthology of essays presented in various ceremonies)
- Ghuncha Phir Laga Khilnay (Humorous poetry)
- Siddiqa Anwar ke naam (Collection of letters addressed to his wife)
- Saif-ul-Muluk (Urdu Translation in prose)
- Meli Meli Dhoop (Poetry on environment)
- Baat Se Baat (Compilation of radio talks)
- Bariyaab (Collection of Naats in Urdu, Punjabi and Persian)
- Kuch Urdu Kuch Punjabi (Urdu and Punjabi poetry)
- Payan Safar Neest (Persian poetry)
- Farsi Adab Ke Chand Goshay (Research work)

== See also ==
- List of Pakistani poets
- List of Urdu language poets
