= Shafay Hussain =

Pakistani politician

Chaudhry Shafay Hussain

Provincial Minister of Industries, Commerce and Investment for Punjab
- Incumbent
- Assumed office 6 March 2024

Member of the Provincial Assembly of the Punjab
- Incumbent
- Assumed office 24 February 2024
- Constituency: PP-31 Gujrat-V

Personal details
- Party: PML(Q) (2024-present)
- Parent: Shujaat Hussain (father)
- Relatives: Chaudhry family

Chaudhry Shafay Hussain is a Pakistani politician who is the current Provincial Minister of Punjab for Trade, in office since March 2024 and has been a Member of the Provincial Assembly of the Punjab since 23 February 2024. He is the son of former Prime Minister of Pakistan, Shujaat Hussain.

== Political career ==
In the 2024 Pakistani general election, Pakistan Muslim League (N) (PML-N) did not fielded any candidate against Hussain of Pakistan Muslim League (Q) (PML-Q]) in Constituency PP-31 Gujrat-V. PML-N cadres in Gujrat vehemently criticized the party's decision not to nominate former Gujrat mayor and PML-N former MPA Haji Nasir Mahmood for the 2024 election. According to a report, Hussain consistently criticized the Mahmood in his speeches. Despite Shafay's statements expressing his disinterest in such favor from the PML-N, the PML-N leadership refrained from allowing its local leaders in Gujrat to contest the election, even independently. This led the PML-N to encounter a significant risk of losing its stronghold in Gujrat as it faced a gradual decline in local support.

He was elected to the Provincial Assembly of the Punjab from Constituency PP-31 Gujrat-V as a candidate of PML-Q in 2024 Pakistani general election. He secured 64,132 votes and defeated PTI-backed candidate Mudassir Machyana, who received 48,311 votes. His uncle Chaudhry Pervez Elahi alleged Hussain of election rigging, stating Shafay should return the mandate of the people of Gujrat.

On 6 March, he was inducted into the provincial cabinet of Punjab Chief Minister Maryam Nawaz despite his lack of parliamentary experience. He was appointed as Provincial Minister of Punjab for Trade and Commerce . Reportedly, Maryam initially objected to including any allies, such as the PML-Q, into her cabinet during the first phase. However, Hussain's father, Shujaat Hussain, managed to influence Maryam from "right quarters".

On 8 April, during a joint press conference, Qaisera Elahi, the wife of Pervez Elahi, and Sumaira Elahi, sister of Shujaat Hussain, accused Shafay and his brother Salik of dividing the family into two factions for power. Elahi stated, “Shujaat Hussain’s sons call themselves the heirs of Zahoor Elahi but his politics had never been like this.” She further mentioned that both siblings utilized their father Shujaat as a "tissue paper", adding that they fractured the family with the assistance of Interior Minister Mohsin Naqvi. Fractures within the family began to emerge during the No-confidence motion against Imran Khan in April 2022.

== Controversies ==
In 2007, Hussain's textile factory, Kunjah Textile Mills, received a loan write off of Rs55.59 million during the tenure of his uncle, Chaudhry Pervez Elahi, as Chief Minister of Punjab.

In 2020, when the National Accountability Bureau (NAB) accused PML-Q leaders Chaudhry Shujaat Hussain and Chaudhry Pervez Elahi of money laundering and accumulating illegal assets, Shafay and his brother Salik Hussain were also implicated in the inquiry for providing loans totaling Rs1.5 billion to various companies owned by them. According to the investigation, bank accounts belonging to Shafay and Salik received foreign remittances totaling Rs 58.7 billion since 2004 and the five individuals who were part of the investigation denied sending any remittances, which indicated that the accused likely used fake identities to funnel unexplained funds from foreign countries to Pakistan.
