= Sharif Kunjahi =

Pakistani writer (1914 - 2007)

Shareef Kunjahi شریف کنجاہی
- Born: 13 May 1914; Kunjah, Punjab, British India
- Died: 20 January 2007 (aged 92); Gujrat, Punjab, Pakistan
- Education: University of the Punjab
- Occupations: Academic, writer, poet
- Writing career
- Language: Punjabi
- Notable works: Jagrate (sleepless nights) - 1958 and 1965; Orak Hondi Lou (dimming light) - 1995
- Notable awards: Pride of Performance Award by the President of Pakistan in 2000; Tamgha-i-Imtiaz (Medal of Excellence) Award by the Government of Pakistan in 1983

Sharif Kunjahi (Punjabi: شریف کنجاہی (Shahmukhi)) (1914 – 2007) was a leading writer and poet of Punjabi language from Pakistan.

He was among the first faculty members of the Department of Punjabi Language at the University of Punjab in the 1970s and contributed to Punjabi literature as a poet, prose writer, teacher, research scholar, linguist, lexicographer and translator.

== Early life and education ==
Sharif was born on 13 May 1914 in Kunjah, a small town of Gujrat District in Punjab. His father was a school teacher. Sharif completed his matriculation in 1930 from a school in Kunjah and higher secondary in 1933 from Government Intermediate College, Jhelum. By that time he had started writing poetry and was known as a progressive writer sympathetic to the Indian National Congress. This affiliation became a hindrance for him to get police clearance for entry-level jobs in the government service.

In 1943, he completed his Munshi Fazal and BA from Punjab University as a private student and later completed teacher's training from Lahore. He then continued teaching at various schools until he obtained the degree of MA Urdu in 1954, and of MA Persian in 1956. In 1959, he was hired as lecturer in Persian language at Government College, Campbellpur (now called Attock), Pakistan. He was transferred to Government College Jhelum from where he retired in 1973. From 1973 to 1980, he taught at the newly established Punjabi Department at the University of the Punjab, Lahore.

== Death ==
He died on 20 January 2007 and was interred in the compound of Ghanimat Kunjahi's mazar in Kunjah, Gujrat District, Pakistan.

== Contributions to Punjabi literature ==
=== Poetry ===
Although Sharif wrote poetry in both Urdu and Persian languages, and even made a name as an Urdu poet quite early in his writing career, Punjabi was always his first love. For an up-and-coming Muslim writer of that period, especially among the early progressive writers and poets, adopting Punjabi for his creative articulation was a rare phenomenon.

He became among the pioneers of modern Punjabi poetry from the 1930s at about the same time when Prof Mohan Singh introduced secular themes and a new style in Punjabi poetry. His first collection of Punjabi poetry Jagraate (sleepless nights) was first published in Gurmukhi in East Punjab in 1958, and wasn't published in Shahmukhi in West Punjab until 1965. It contained only 37 poems. His second anthology Orak Hondi Lou (dimming light) was published in 1995.

Kunjahi's poetry is a complete break from the qissa and Sufi traditions. Even his earliest poems have all the elements of modern poetry: secularism, expression of individualist experience, awareness of social and political changes around him. His deep sense of departure from the existing value system was expressed in many of his early poems:

Today, I am going to walk past your village,
A place from where I was not able to move away in the past,
Where I always was looking for some excuse to go.
What excuse? The truth is that you were the real reason
Who had made that village a place for pilgrimage?
What a beautiful name it had,
How exciting it was to just listen to its name.
Looking at its trees from a distance would take away all tiredness,
It seemed like their branches were giving me a signal to come close.
Standing under their shadow was heavenly.
Today, I will walk by those trees.
Nothing is pulling me towards them,
Neither do I feel the loving touch of breeze coming from your village
No one is there to meet me with affection
Or waiting for me,
Hiding behind the Kikkar trees, and alone
I am passing by your village
As if it is a graveyard, not a village.
(Translation from Jagraate)

Without being overburdened by symbolism or emotions, Kunjahi's poetry is an expression of his social consciousness in a relatively simple manner. He played a role in setting new directions for Punjabi poetry and he opened doors for Punjabi poets to move away from the traditional style of writing poetry and experiment with new modes and techniques.

=== Prose ===
Just like he had done in poetry, Sharif Kunjahi also broke new grounds in Punjabi prose. It was through his translations in Punjabi of two books of Bertrand Russell and Allama Iqbal’s lectures — ‘Reconstruction of Religious Thoughts’ — among the numerous other translations, that he demonstrated that Punjabi language is capable of eloquently communicating even the most complex philosophical thoughts. He developed many new terms by creatively employing the vast treasure of Punjabi vocabulary.

He was among the earliest writers who employed modern techniques of literary criticism. In a different field, his research in identifying many linguistic similarities in the Punjabi and Scandinavian languages is another pioneering piece of work.

His work contributed to the development of Punjabi literature and language, providing translations and research during a period when Punjabi was less commonly used for literary expression.

== Punjabi Translation of Quran ==
Quran Punjabi Translation He translated the Qur'an into Punjabi, which was published in 1997 by the Punjabi Foundation. Al-Quran ul Karim (Arabic-Punjabi) Sharif Kunjahi is available in UMT Lahore code is 61158 and 297-12259142 ALQ v-2. At the Quaid-e-Azam Library, Lahore, both volumes of Sharif Kunjahi's Punjabi translations are available Library code is 237.45 498 ج 2،ج1 ش On internet this translation in Punjabi Shahmukhi is available on Website http://apnaorg.com/quran/page1.htm

Surah Fatiah 01 https://api.quranhakim.com/Rangeen/Template1/131_1_-1

Surah Baqarah 02 https://api.quranhakim.com/Rangeen/Template1/131_2_-1

Surah Aal-e-Imran 03 https://api.quranhakim.com/Rangeen/Template1/131_3_-1

Surah Nisa https://api.quranhakim.com/Rangeen/Template1/131_4_-1

Surah Maidah 05 https://api.quranhakim.com/Rangeen/Template1/131_5_-1

Surah An Naas https://api.quranhakim.com/Rangeen/Template1/131_114_-1

A new Punjabi Shahmukhi translation by Professor Roshan Khan Kakar in 2021 has been published by Daurulislam Publisher. A link to his Punjabi translation is

Surah Fatiah 01 https://api.quranhakim.com/Rangeen/Template1/122_1_-1

Surah Baqarah 02 https://api.quranhakim.com/Rangeen/Template1/122_2_-1

Surah Aal-e-Imran 03 https://api.quranhakim.com/Rangeen/Template1/122_3_-1

Surah Nisa https://api.quranhakim.com/Rangeen/Template1/122_4_-1

Surah Maidah 05 https://api.quranhakim.com/Rangeen/Template1/122_5_-1

Surah An Naas https://api.quranhakim.com/Rangeen/Template1/122_114_-1

== Translator ==
Sharif Kunjahi also translated the Quran in fluent Punjabi language.

== Awards and recognition ==
- Pride of Performance Award by the President of Pakistan in 2000.
- Tamgha-i-Imtiaz (Medal of Excellence) Award by the Government of Pakistan in 1983
- A tribute was paid to Sharif Kunjahi at a Pakistan Academy of Letters event by his fellow writers.
- Lifetime Achievement Award by the World Punjabi Congress
- Nishan-i-Gujrat Award by the Literary Award Council of Gujrat in 1980
