= List of institutes in Gujrat, Pakistan =

Following are institutes located in Gujrat, Pakistan

== Institutes ==
- Government Boy's Primaryschool, Nathuwal
- Government Girl's Primary school, Nathuwal
- Inzimam Ul Haq High School, Majra Shamali, Karianwala
- Dar-e-Arqam Schools
- Govt. High School, Gochh
- Lahore Grammar School
- Al Hijaz Secondary School, Khambi
- The Chenab School, Boys & Girls
- Govt. Public High School No.2 Railway Rd, Gujrat
- Govt.Comprehensive School, Servis Morr.
- Govt. Zamindara School
- BSS Gujrat Campus
- Govt Boys High School Bhagwal

== Colleges and Universities ==
- Government Zamindar College, Gujrat
- University of Gujrat
