= Nawabzada Mazhar Ali =

Pakistani politician (1945–2025)

Nawabzada Mazher Ali
- نوابزادہ مظہر علی

Member of the National Assembly of Pakistan
- In office 1 June 2013 – 31 May 2018
- Constituency: NA-104 (Gujrat-I)

Personal details
- Born: 1 November 1945
- Died: 16 November 2025 (aged 80) Lahore, Punjab, Pakistan
- Party: Pakistan Muslim League (N)
- Relatives: Nawabzada Gazanfar Ali Gul (brother)

Nawabzada Mazher Ali Khan (Urdu: نوابزادہ مظہر علی خان; 1 November 1945 – 16 November 2025) was a Pakistani politician who was a member of the National Assembly of Pakistan, from June 2013 to May 2018.

== Background ==
Ali was born on 1 November 1945, and died on 16 November 2025, at the age of 80. He was Nawabzada Gazanfar Ali Gul's brother.

== Political career ==
Ali was elected to the National Assembly of Pakistan as a candidate of Pakistan Muslim League (N) (PML-N) from Constituency NA-104 (Gujrat-I) in the 2013 Pakistani general election. He received 85,113 votes and defeated Chaudhry Wajahat Hussain.
