= Government Zamindar College, Gujrat =

College in Punjab, Pakistan

Government Zamindar College
- Type: Public
- Established: 10 February 1937
- Students: 3,500
- Location: Gujrat District, Punjab, Pakistan; 32°36′06″N 74°04′40″E
- Campus: Urban
- Website: zamindarcollege.edu.pk

Government Zamindar College, Gujrat is a government college located in the Gujrat District of Punjab, Pakistan. The college also offers postgraduate courses.

== History ==
It was founded as Cold Stream Zamindar School by Nawab Sir Fazal Ali Khan, grandfather of Nawabzada Ghazanfar Ali Gul and Nawabzada Mazhar Ali. In 1936, it was upgraded into a college.

== Zamindar College's mosque ==
The mosque's foundation was laid by then governor of West Pakistan, Sardar Abdur Rab Nishtar, in 1950. The mosque, modeled after Lahore's historic Badshahi Masjid, features a main hall measuring 120 by 67 feet.

In 2011, during renovation a dome collapsed which led the Government of Punjab to label the entire college and remaining five domes as hazardous. As a result, the college administration ordered their demolition and closed the main hall, following engineering advice regarding potential structural failure.

== Alumni ==
- Tilak Raj Puri, Indian bureaucrat and statistician
- Anwar Masood, Pakistani poet
- Ismat Beg, scholar, researcher and teacher
- Manzoor Hussain Atif, Pakistani Olympian
- Khalil-ur-Rehman Khan, Chief Justice of the Lahore High Court
- Raja Afrasiab Khan, Judge of the Supreme Court of Pakistan
- Fakhar Zaman
- Malik Allahyar Khan
- Abdullah Hussain (writer, born 1931)
