= Ghanimat Kunjahi =

Persian-language poet and Sufi in the Mughal Empire

Muhammad Akram Ghanimat Kunjahi (died c. 1713 CE) was a Punjabi poet of Persian language and Sufi in the Mughal Empire.

== Biography ==
Little is known about his life with certainty, except that he descended from a family of muftis originating from the village of Kunjah, in Gujrat District. He was a disciple of Sayyid Muhammad Salih, himself a favourite disciple of Naushah Ganj Bakhsh, a well known saint associated with Qādiriyya Sufi order. He is reported to have travelled to Kashmir, Kabul and Delhi. The date of death of Kunjahi is not known: but since he praises Farrukhsiyar (enthroned 1713) in his Golzār-e moḥabbat and his death is mentioned in his nephew Moḥammad Māh Ṣedāqat-e Konjāhī's Ṯawāqeb al-manāqeb (written 1714), he probably died towards the end of 1713. He is buried in his native village of Kunjah.

== Works ==
Kunjahi wrote in Persian using the sabk-i hindī style, characterized by a fondness for the ghazal form and an interest in realistic and sometimes erotic themes. His works reflected complex imagery, themes, and syntax. Notable works of Kunjahi include a Dīvan consisting of 233 ghazals and 12 robāʿīs; Golzār-e moḥabbat, a mathnawi of 591 lines and the Nayrang-i ʿishḳ ('Talisman of Love'), a sentimental and romantic mathnawī of 1500 lines set in Punjab during Kunjahi's time.

Nayrang-i ʿishḳ was written in 1685, and was highly esteemed in India. The poem starts with the formal praise to the land of Punjab where the story is set. It then tells the tale of love between prince Aziz and a dancer named Shahid. The poem was translated into several languages in the subsequent centuries. Notable translations include that of Abd al-Hamid Mohmand (in Pashto), Bhagwant Rai Rāhat (in Urdu) and Mian Muhammad Bakhsh (in Punjabi).

== Legacy ==
In popular local memory, Kunjahi was remembered as a miracle worker associated with improving mental faculties, curing insanity, and aiding aspiring poets. His tomb was revered for its alleged powers, and it became a site for interring other poets, including Shareef Kunjahi. The Bazm-i-Ghanimat literary organization in Pakistan was named after him.

== Editions ==
- Dīwān, ed. Ghulām Rabbānī ʿAzīz (Lahore 1958)
- Nayrang-i ʿishk, ed. Ghulām Rabbānī ʿAzīz (Lahore: Panjabi Adabi Akademi, 1962)

== Sources ==
- Bausani, A. (1974). "'Indian Elements in the Indo-Persian Poetry: The Style of Ganimat Kunǧāhī'". In J.M. Barral (ed.). Orientalia Hispanica Sive Studia F.M. Pareja Octogenario Dicata. Vol. 1: Arabica-Islamica. Leiden: Brill. pp. 105–19. Reproduced in Chaghatai, M. Ikram (30 October 2014). "Ghanīmat Kunjāhī– A Leading Persian Poet of Sabk-i Hindī (with an article by A. Bausani)". Oriental College Magazine. 89 (3): 12–36.
- Shackle, Christopher (1999). "Persian Poetry and Qadiri Sufism in late Mughal India: Ghanimat Kunjahi and his mathnawi Nayrang-i Ishq". In Lewisohn, L.; Morgan, D. (eds.). Late Classical Persianate Sufism. Oxford: Oneworld. pp. 435–63.
- Naushahi, Arif (2000). "Ḡanīmat Konjāhī". In Yarshater, Ehsan (ed.). Encyclopædia Iranica. Vol. X/3: Fruit–Gāvbāzī. London and New York: Routledge & Kegan Paul. pp. 278–279. ISBN 978-0-933273-47-4.
- Naficy, S. (1965). "G̲h̲anīmat Kund̲j̲āhī". In Lewis, B.; Pellat, Ch. & Schacht, J. (eds.). The Encyclopaedia of Islam, Second Edition. Volume II: C–G. Leiden: E. J. Brill. p. 1006. doi:10.1163/1573-3912_islam_SIM_8560. OCLC 495469475.
