= Muhammad Afzal Lone =

Muhammad Afzal Lone (4 July 1928 – 2 August 2020) was a Pakistani lawyer and judge.

== Life and career ==
Muhammad Afzal Lone was born in Gujrat on 4 July 1928. After having his early education from the local high school, he got a bachelor's degree from the Zamindar College Gujrat.

His interest in law and the legal profession motivated him to join the Punjab University Law College, where he earned his degree in Law and Jurisprudence. Lone took an active part in the freedom movement as a young and energetic student.

Lone joined the law profession and served as an advocate under the Lahore High Court from 1955 to 1978. He was President of the Bar Association Rawalpindi in 1974-75 and was a Member of the Executive Council Allama Iqbal Open University and that of the Board of Trustees Lahore University of Management Sciences. He was also the Chairman of the Punjab Bar Council Tribunal.

Lone was a Standing Council for Pakistan and Deputy Attorney General for Pakistan from 1975 to 1978. He was elevated as Judge of the Lahore High Court in 1978.

Lone was further elevated to the Supreme Court of Pakistan in 1990 and retired as a Judge of the Supreme Court, on superannuation in 1993 after a meritorious record of service at bench and the bar for about 40 years. However, he was much criticized for his judgment in the 'co-operatives scam case' in which he absolved the company owned by the heads of the ruling party, Ittefaq Group, of any wrongdoings. He was later elected to the Senate of Pakistan in March 1997 for a period of six years on a Pakistan Muslim League (N) ticket. He was the Chairman of the Senate Standing Committee on Interior and Narcotics control and was also a Member of the Senate Standing Committee on Cabinet, Establishment and Management Services and that of the Law, Justice and Parliamentary Affairs.

He died on 2 August 2020, at the age of 92.
