= Imam Din Gujrati =

Pakistani humorous poet of Urdu and Punjabi (1870-1954)

Ustad Imam Din Gujrati
- Born: Imam-ud-Din; 15 April 1870; Gujrat, British India (now Pakistan)
- Died: 22 February 1954 (aged 83); Gujrat, Pakistan
- Occupation: Poet
- Writing career
- Language: Urdu, Punjabi
- Notable work: Bang-e- Dhul, Bang-e-Raheel, Sur Israfil, The Principal of Poetry

Ustad Imam Din Gujrati (Note: Punjabi/Urdu: استاد امام دین گجراتی) (15 April 1870 - 22 February 1954) was a Pakistani humorous poet of Urdu and Punjabi language.

== Early life and education ==
Imam Din Gujarati was born on 15 April 1870, in Gujrat, British India (now Pakistan). His real name was Imam-ud-Din, his father's name was Mir Hasan Din. His education was only up to 'primary school' which is also called 'elementary school' in some parts of the world. He was employed in Chongi, Gujarat Revenue Department in British India for 40 years.

== Career ==
He started writing poetry in 1902. Imam Din Gujarati's speech has a unique place in Urdu and Punjabi poetry. At first, he used to write Punjabi poetry but later on at the insistence of his close friend, poet and journalist Rahat Malik's elder brother Malik Abdul Rehman Khadim, he also started writing and reciting poetry in Urdu.

Since he did not have much knowledge in Urdu language, he invented his own style for his poetry by mixing Urdu and Punjabi language which was very popular back then and is very popular even today. Imam Din has gained a lot of fame by adopting his hometown's Gujarati style. He personally went to meet Allama Iqbal in Lahore and described this meeting humorously in this couplet below:

Hum Nay Bhee Lahore Ja Kar Daikha, Allama Sir Muhammad Iqbal

Baatain Bhee Karta Jaata Thaa, Huqqa Bhee Peeta Jaata Thaa Naal Naal

Poem	Poet
Teri Maan Pakaaye Matar Imamdina, Tu Kothay Pe Chadh Ke Akarr Imamdina	Imam Din Gujrati
Haseenon Ki Zulfain Kahan Teri Qismat Mein, Tu Choohon Ki Moonchhain Patt Imamdina	Imam Din Gujrati
Idhar Baadhta Hai Udhar Baadhta Hai, Khyaali Sanam Choondhian Baadhta Hai	Imam Din Gujrati
Kyun Na Haun Makhhian Unn Ke Chehray Pe Fida, Keh Hamara Sanam Reoddian Chaabta Hai	Imam Din Gujrati

== Authorship ==
His poetry collection was published under the names of Bang-e-Dhul (published in 1932), Bang-e-Raheel (published in 1944) and Sur Israfil. He also authored a book, The Principal of Poetry.

== Death ==
Imam Din Gujrati died on 22 February 1954, in Gujarat, Pakistan at age 83.
