= Syed Munir Hussain Gilani =

Pakistani politician (born 1943)

- Born: January 9, 1943 (age 83); Gujrat, Punjab, Pakistan
- Political party: Islamic Democratic Front
- Spouse: Samia Munir Gilani
- Children: No information available

Syed Munir Hussain Gilani is a prominent figure. He is also a Pakistani politician, businessman and activist who fought for civil rights and democracy in Pakistan. He remained the Federal Minister for Education in the interim government of Prime Minister Balkh Sher Mazari.

He started his political career as PPP worker from Model Town Lahore and actively took part in election campaign of Zulfikar Ali Bhutto's 1970 and 1977 elections from Lahore constituency. Later impressed by political ideology of Imam Khomeini, founder of Islamic Revolution in Iran, Munir Gilani joined Tehreek-e-Nifaz-e-Fiqah-e-Jafaria Pakistan under the leadership of Mufti Jafar Hussain. After demise of Mufti Jafar Hussain on August 29, 1983, Supreme Council of TNFJ elected Parachinar based 38-years old young Shia cleric Allama Arif Hussain Al-Hussaini as president on February 10, 1984, in Imambargah Qasar-e-Zainab, Bhakar, Punjab. Syed Munir Gilani was the first leader to host Allama Arif ul Hussaini in Lahore and manage hold a Press Conference at Lahore's local hotel. He was nominated Head of Political Cell of the TNFJ Punjab chapter and played an active role at MRD platform against the Military dictatorship of General Zia ul Haq.

After martyrdom of Allama Arif ul Hussaini on August 5, 1988, close aid of the deceased and Senior Vice President Allama Syed Sajid Ali Naqvi was elected as third Head of TNFJ, the largest Shia religio-political party in Pakistan. Munir Gilani remained very close to Allama Sajid Ali Naqvi as well and helped manage TNFJ alliance with Pakistan Awami Tehreek of Dr Tahir ul Qadri and Tehreek-e-Istiqlal of Air Marshal Asghar Khan (late). The People's Democratic Alliance (PDA) was also his brain child that managed 4-parties' electoral alliance comprising PPP, Tehreek-e-Istiqlal, PML-Qasim and Tehreek-e-Nifaz-e-Fiqah-e- Jafaria. He also emphasised to change nomenclature of TNFJ to Tehreek-e-Jafaria Pakistan (TJP). Later, it was changed by the permission of Quaid-e-Millat-e-Jafaria Pakistan, Allama Sajid Ali Naqvi and approved by executive bodies, Supreme Council and Central Council of the Tehreek.

Munir Gilani is the former Deputy Secretary General of the Pakistan Awami Ittehad. He has been arrested on innumerable occasions during his long political career in the struggle for revival of democracy. After the government of General Zia-ul-Haq went back on its promise to hold general elections in the country, leading political parties got together under the banner of the MRD for the purpose of holding general elections, restoration of fundamental civil and democratic rights, removal of restrictions placed on the free functioning of the press and the establishment of an independent judiciary. He was arrested on numerous occasions for taking part in a movement launched by the political parties and political Alliances such as MRD, PDA, Pakistan Awami Ittehad and most recently ARD.

After the formation of the Peoples Democratic Alliance prior to the 1990 elections, Syed Munir Hussain Gilani joined PDA for the democratic moment and was nominated as Additional General Secretary. The PDA was then the main opposition alliance in Pakistan and it consisted of the Pakistan Peoples Party, the Tehrik-e-Istiqlal and the Tehreek-e-Nifaz-e-Fiqah Jaferia, the Pakistan Muslim League (Qasim group) and the Pukhtoonkhawa Qoumi Party.

He was appointed Federal Minister for Education in the interim government of Prime Minister Mir Balakh Sher Mazari in 1993. He represented the Tehreek-e-Nifaz-e-Fiqah-e-Jaferia in that government.

Later, he parted his ways with TJP and formed his own political party Islamic Democratic Front in 1996, and joined Pakistan Awami Ittehad, and later became the Deputy General Secretary Alliance for Restoration of Democracy.

On January 12, 2005, in an important meeting of ARD, Syed Munir Hussain Gilani supported democratic movement in Pakistan as reported by the country's leading newspaper. He also condemned the idea of boycotting the general elections, 2007 held by Gen. Musharraf in All Parties Conference held in London on July 2, 2006. Sitting 1st from left with Zafar Iqbal Jhagra, Shahbaz Sharif, Nawaz Sharif and Muhtarma Benezir Bhutto.

Nowadays, he is writing articles in the leading Urdu newspapers of Pakistan. His various articles has been published by The Daily Jang, The Daily Pakistan, The Daily Express and Daily Din newspaper.

== Syed Munir Hussain Gilani and Mohtarma Benazir Bhutto ==
Syed Munir Hussain Gilani closely worked with the father of Mohtarma Benazir Bhutto, Zulfiqar Ali Bhutto in his election campaign of 1970. When Mohtarma Benazir Bhutto returned Pakistan from exile and became the first female prime minister of Pakistan, Syed Munir Hussain Gilani helped her in establishing strong relationships with Iran.

Munir Gilani has written 2 volumes of his autobiography "SIASI BEDARI' سیاسی بیداری" i.e. Political Awakening. Senior Journalist Nazir Ali Bhatti helped him to write his books. Syed Munir Gilani is also column writer under the title of "Awaz e Jamhoor" "Voice of the People"
