= Gujrat, Pakistan =

City in Punjab, Pakistan

Gujrat گُجرات (Punjabi)
- City
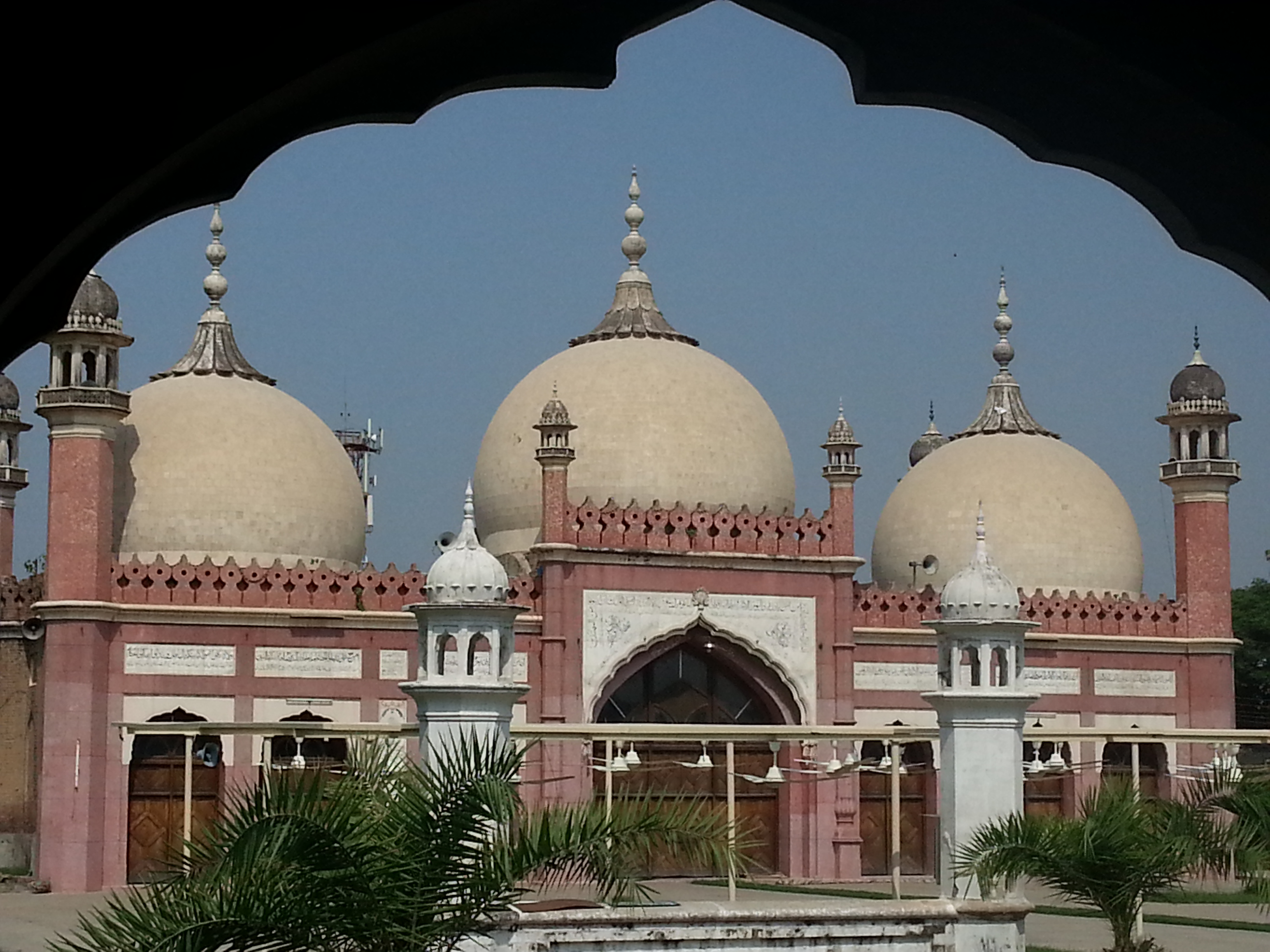
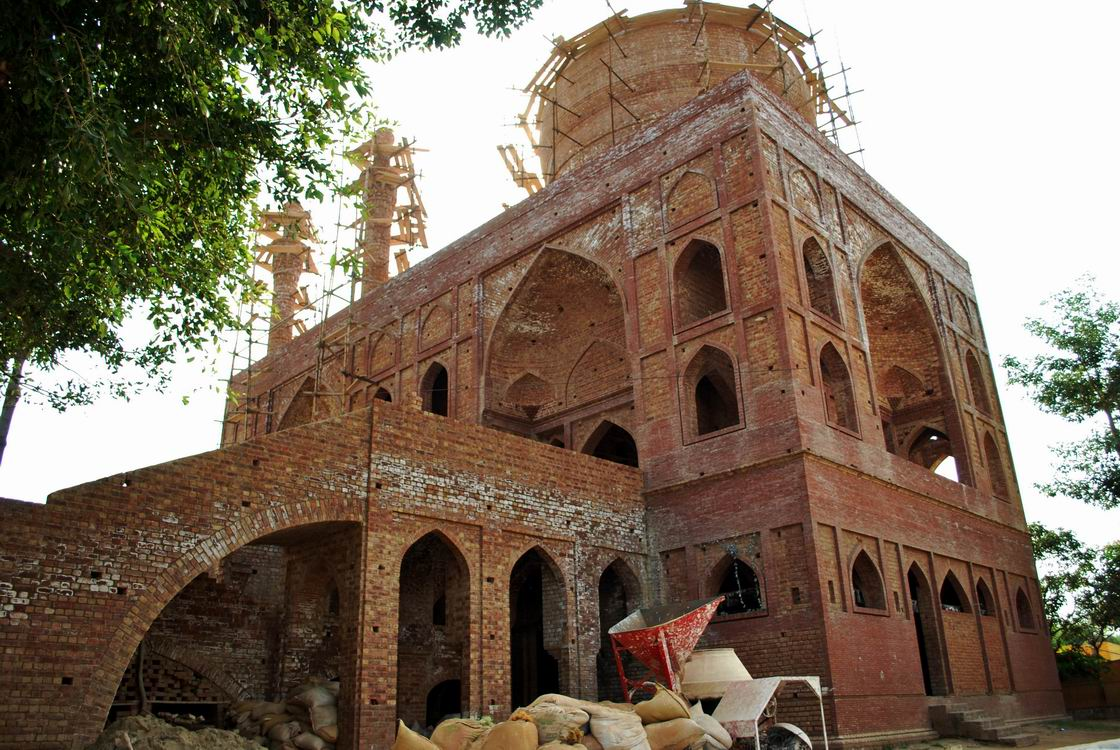
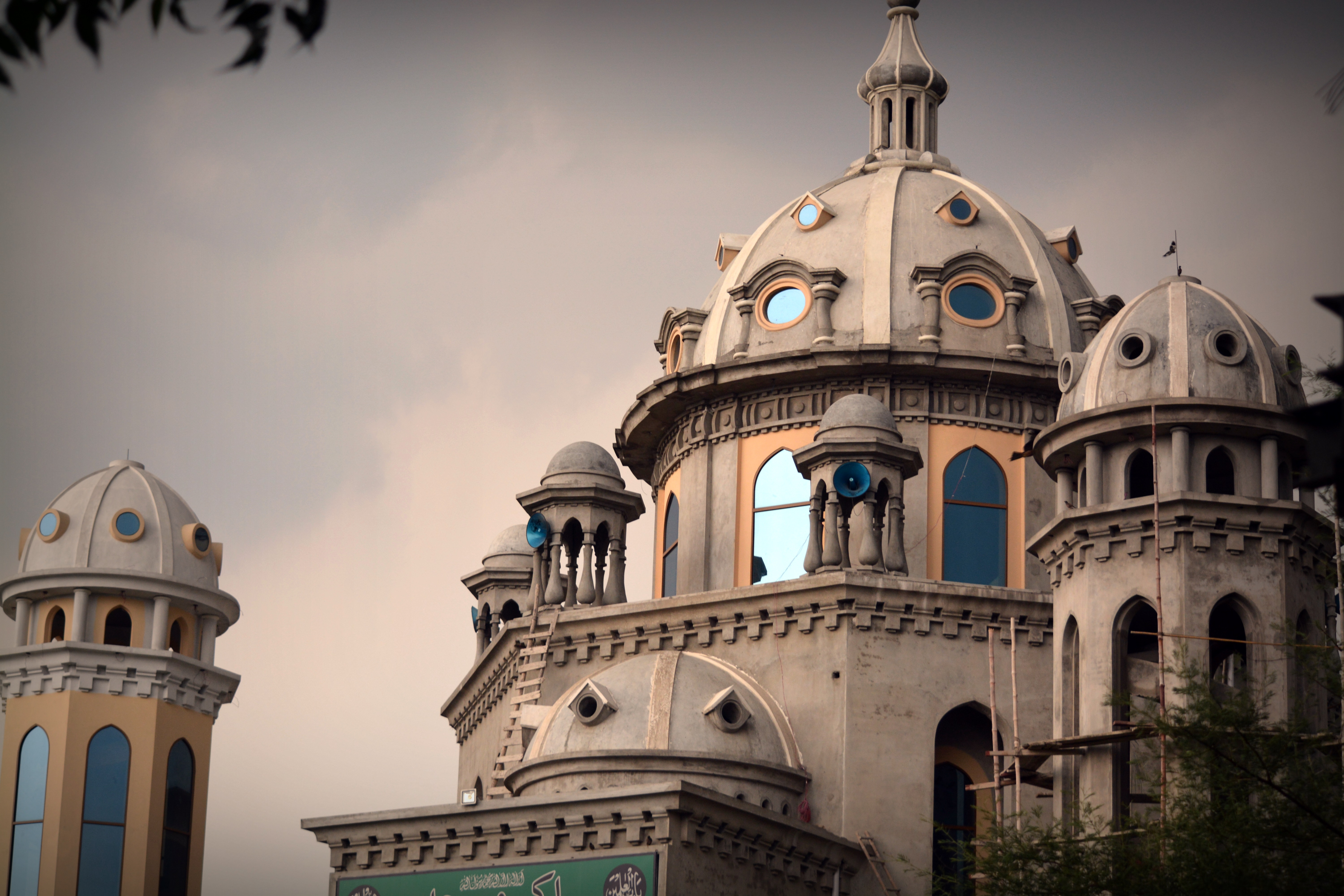
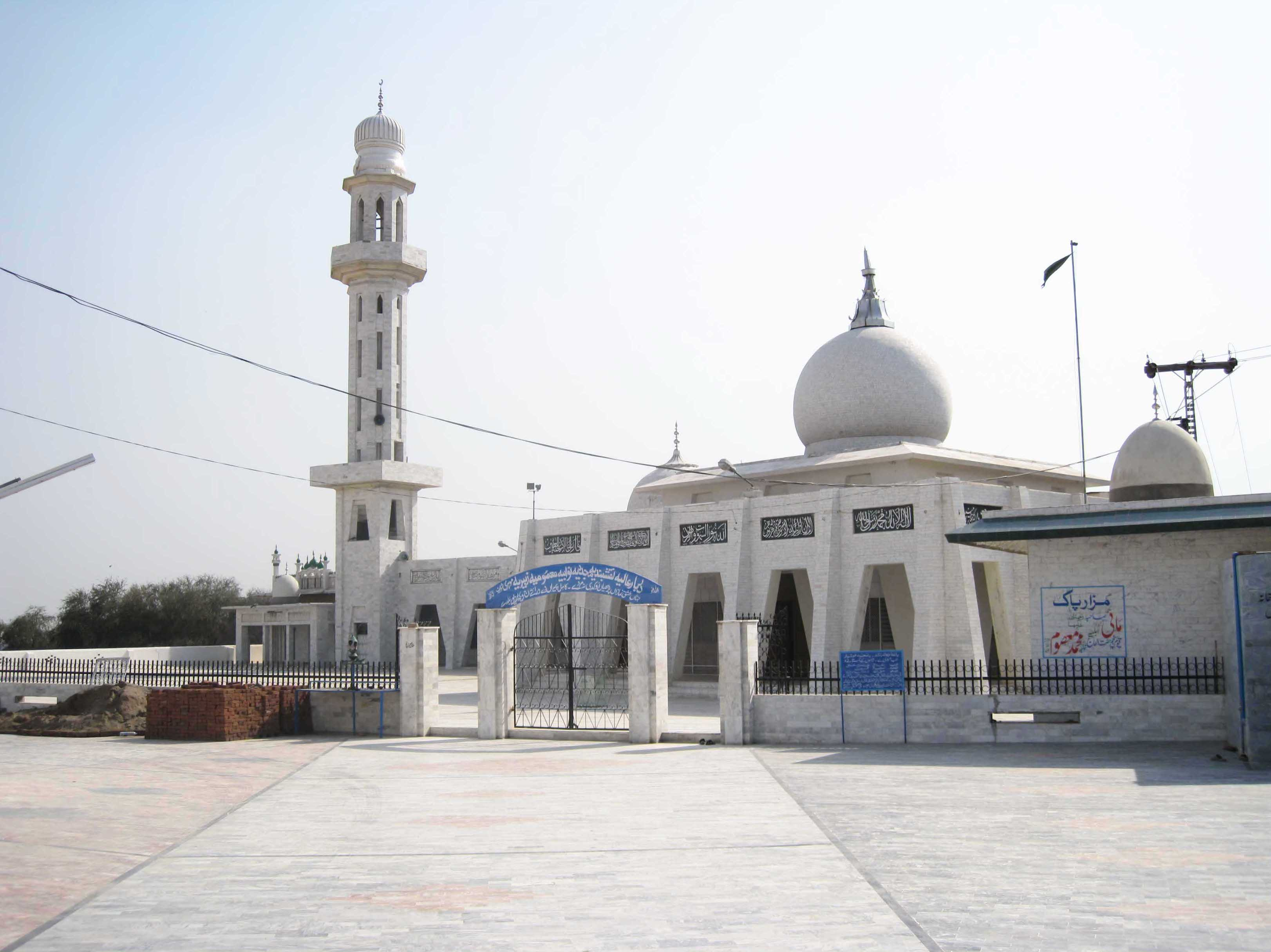
- Eid Gah Gujrat Chal-e-Sharif Tomb A mosque in Gujrat Darbar Mohri Sharif

- Location in Punjab, Pakistan Gujrat (Pakistan)
- Coordinates: 32°34′26″N 74°4′44″E
- Country: Pakistan
- Province: (Punjab, Pakistan) Punjab
- Division: Gujrat
- District: Gujrat
- Founded: Before 9th century CE
- City status: 16th century CE

Government
  - Type: Metropolitan Corporation
  - Mayor: None (Vacant)
  - Deputy Commissioner: Nur-ul-Ain Qureshi
  - District Police Officer: Rana Umar Farooq

Area
  - Total: 65 km^{2} (25 sq mi)
- Highest elevation: 250 m (820 ft)
- Lowest elevation: 223 m (732 ft)

Population (2023 census)
  - Total: 574,240
  - Rank: 16th in Pakistan; 11th in Punjab
  - Density: 8,800/km^{2} (23,000/sq mi)
  - Language: Punjabi (native)
- Demonym: Gujratiye
- Time zone: UTC+5 (PKT)
- Postal code: 50700
- Calling code: 053
- HDI (2024): 0.853 (very high)
- Number of union councils: 18

Gujrat (Note: Punjabi, Urdu: گُجرات) (Punjabi: [ɡʊd͡ʒɾaːt̪]) is a city, located along the western bank of the Chenab River, in the northern region of Punjab, Pakistan. It serves as the headquarters of its eponymous district and division. It is the 11th-most populous city in Punjab and the 16th in Pakistan, with an urban population of 574,240 in 2023.

Having an industrial and export-oriented economy, Gujrat constitutes the "Golden Triangle of Punjab" alongside Sialkot and Gujranwala. It is also known for being the setting of the classical Punjabi folktale of Sohni Mahiwal. The historic Gujrat Fort is located in the city.

== History ==
Gujrat is a place of antiquity and has important ancient sites. The city and the district formed a part of the kingdom of Porus who ruled primarily within the Chaj Doab. He fought against Alexander at the Battle of Hydaspes in May 326 BC. Although Macedonians prevailed in the battle, Alexander was impressed by his bravery and reinstalled him as a satrap. A local legend suggests that after the death of Porus, a ruler named Kula Chand founded a new settlement near Jalalpur Jattan. This new city, reportedly comprising several smaller settlements, was named Kulachor.

With Alexander's death in June 323 BC, Chandragupta Maurya (referred to in Greek sources as "Sandrokottos") who was from Magadha region (present-day Bihar in India) established the Mauryan Empire. The region remained under the Mauryas until shortly after the death of Ashoka in 231 BC, and later came under the sway of Demetrius I who founded the Indo-Greek Kingdom. The Scythian invasion brought about by Maues in the latter half of the second century brought a change of rulers and the Indo-Scythian Kingdom was established shortly after. This would change in the early first century CE when a Parthian governor Gondophares declared independence from the Parthian Empire. He moved east in 19 CE, conquering territory from the Indo-Scythians and Indo-Greeks, thus forming his own Indo-Parthian Kingdom. The domains of the Indo-Parthians were greatly reduced following the invasions of the Kushans in the second half of the first century CE, who formed a vast prosperous empire in Central and South Asia which oversaw a flowering of Buddhism.

For several hundreds years, nothing is known about the area except between 455 and 550 CE, when it was exposed to the ravages of the Alchon Huns. After the decline of the Alchon Huns, it became the main base of the new kingdom of Gurjara, under a certain Alakhana. According to the Rajatarangini, it was invaded between 883 and 902 CE by Sankaravarman of the Utpala dynasty in Kashmir who fought and defeated the Gurjara ruler Alakhana. The name Alakhana etymologically is in reference to the Alchon Huns. This may be the Alakhana whom the present Gujar tribe in Gujrat hail as their elder and founder of Gujrat. The putative Hunnic origin of the ruler Alakhana, remembered as Ali Khan in the tradition and memory of the Gujars centuries after their conversion to Islam, led British historians to conclude that the Gujars were originally from the stock of the Alchon Huns.

Gujrat was known and inhabited during the early 16th century when the Suri ruler Sher Shah toppled the Mughals under Humayun. The area was named Khwaspur, in honour of Suri governor of Rohtas, Khawas Khan. The city came under the Mughal Empire again and developed during the reign of Akbar in the latter half of the 16th century, who built the Gujrat Fort, and allowed Gujars to settle in the fort who had been living within the district for centuries up to this time. The city and district was formally named in reference to the local Gujar tribe.

In 1605, Syed Abdul Kasim was granted the city as a fief by Akbar. During the reign of Jahangir, Gujrat was part of the route used by the Mughal family when visiting Kashmir. In the Mughal era, Gujrat was encircled by a wall with five gates, of which only the Shah Daula gate survives.

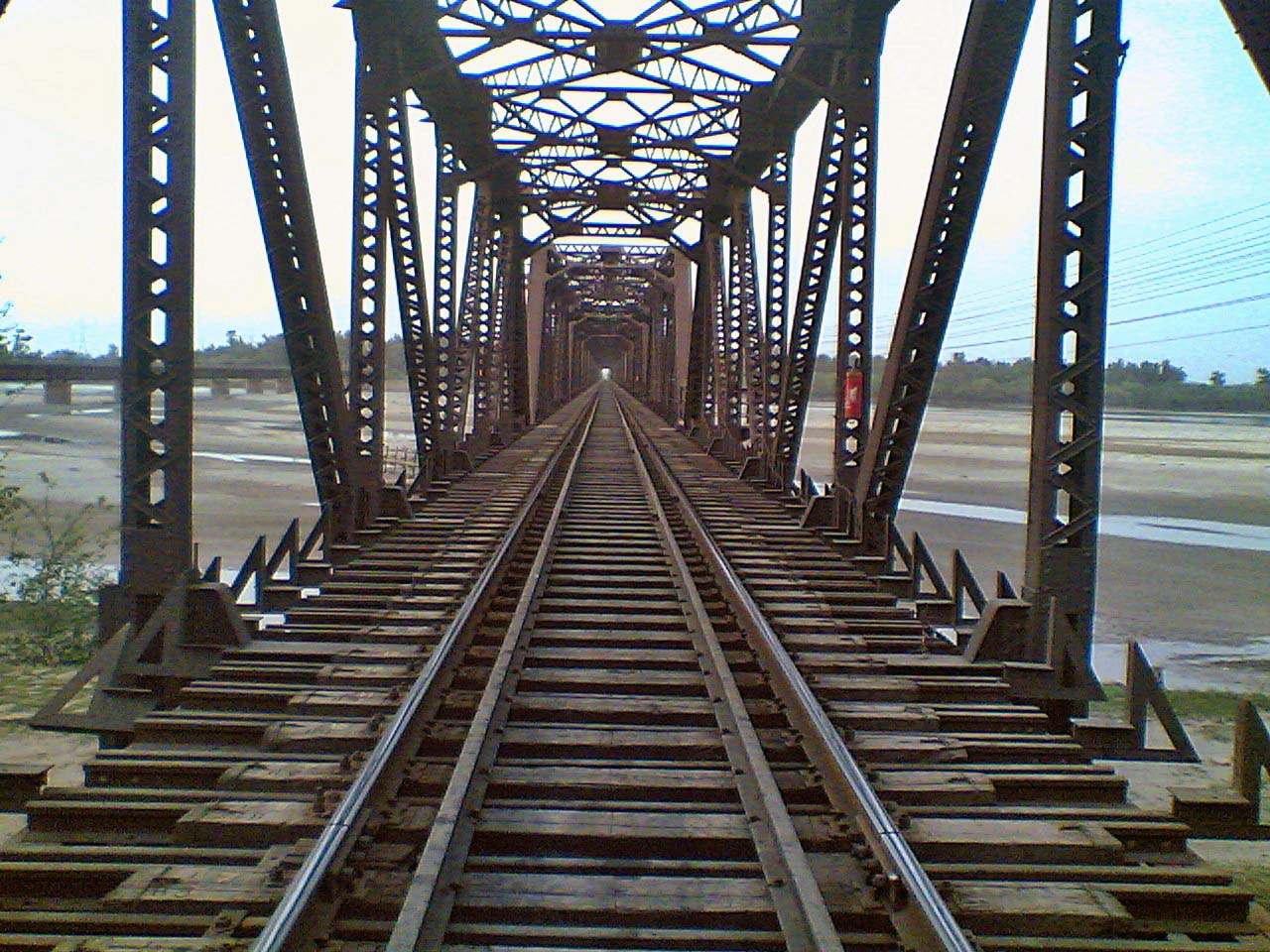
Gujrats's Alexandria bridge spans the Chenab River, and was built during the British era.

With the death of Aurangzeb, in 1707, the Mughal Empire began to weaken significantly. Mughal authority in Punjab remained in the hands of Mughal Nawabs, despite the Afsharid ruler Nader Shah leading an invasion in 1739 that resulted in the sacking of the capital Delhi. Nadir Shah's invasion of India on November 18, 1738, brought devastation to Gujrat as well. With a massive army of two hundred and seventy thousand men, he crossed the Indus and entered the Punjab. His orders were to leave nothing standing within the reach of his troops' weapons, instilling fear particularly in Nawab Zakaria Khan, the viceroy of Lahore. His forces crossed the Chenab River near the Shahdoula Shrine, entering Gujrat and pillaging the town. As part of his battle strategy, Nadir Shah stationed one of his generals, Mirza Nur Beg, with a contingent in Gujrat, while he himself led the bulk of his forces against the army of the governor of Lahore, Mirza Kalandar Beg, who was stationed near Wazirabad at the Chenab River.

Mughal rule effectively collapsed in Punjab after Mir Mannu died in 1753. The Durrani Afghans under their new ruler Ahmad Shah Durrani annexed the region directly from the Mughals. The city suffered further from the eight invasions of the Durrani Afghans between 1748 and 1767 who fought the Sikhs for control of Punjab. In the ensuing chaos, the city was captured by local Punjabi Gakhar tribesmen under the leadership of Muqarrab Khan from the Pothohar Plateau to the west.

In 1765, the city was overrun by the Sikh Bhangi Misl under Gujar Siṅgh who defeated the Gakhars under their chief Muqarrab Khan. In 1765, Chaudhry Rehmat Khan Warraich of Jalalpur Jattan wrote a letter to Gujar Siṅgh, urging him to attack Gujrat and overthrow his rival Muqarrab Khan. This invitation marked a significant shift in alliances, as Rehmat Khan, once an ally of Adina Beg against the Sikhs, recognized the changing political dynamics in Punjab and extended a diplomatic gesture to the Sikhs. Diwan Shiv Nath Handa, an associate of Rehmat Khan from Jalalpur Jattan, also supported this move.

Responding to the call, Gujar Siṅgh swiftly marched towards the northeast of Punjab, capturing 150 villages, including Wazirabad, Eminabad, and Sodhra, before reaching Gujrat in December 1765. Here, Chaudhry Rehmat Khan joined forces with Gujar Siṅgh against Muqarrab Khan. Despite Muqarrab Khan's determined resistance, he was defeated in the battle and sought refuge in the Gujrat Fort. Following the intense clash with the Sikhs, the entire area was in a state of chaos.

The Sikhs swiftly laid siege to the fort of Gujrat, disrupting Muqarrab Khan's supply lines and ultimately forcing him to abandon his stronghold. The Gakhar chief, riding on an elephant, crossed a ravine known as Nali-e-Jou-e-Bar in Kunjah near Mauza Ghaidowal, located to the west of Gujrat, but he never emerged. The Sikhs defeated an Afghan force in a battle for Gujrat on 29 April 1797. In 1798, the Bhangi leader Sahib Singh pledged allegiance to the Sukerchakia Misl of Ranjit Singh who later established the Sikh Empire in 1799. By 1810, Ranjit Singh's armies captured the city from Bhangi forces, thereby extending the rule of the Sikh Empire to the city.

Gujrat finally came under British control in 1849, following the collapse of the Sikh Empire in the wake of the Sikh defeat at the Battle of Gujrat on 22 February, which ended the Second Anglo-Sikh War. In 1867, Gujrat was constituted as a municipality. According to the census, the city had a population of 18,396 in 1881, 19,410 in 1901 and 21,974 in 1921.

Gujrat became divisional capital in 2022 with the establishment of Gujrat Division.

== Geography ==
Gujrat is an ancient city of Pakistan located between two famous rivers, Jhelum River and Chenab River. It is bounded to the northeast by Azad Kashmir; to the northwest by the Jhelum River; to the east and southeast by the Chenab River, separating it from the districts of Gujranwala and Sialkot; and to the west by Mandi Bahauddin District. Gujrat consists of three tehsils: Sarai Alamgir, Kharian and Gujrat.

It is served by Gujrat railway station on the Karachi–Peshawar Line, the main railway line of Pakistan Railways.

== Climate ==
Gujrat has a monsoon-influenced humid subtropical climate (Köppen Cwa), although it is almost dry enough to be a hot semi-arid climate (BSh).

Climate data for Gujrat
Month	Jan	Feb	Mar	Apr	May	Jun	Jul	Aug	Sep	Oct	Nov	Dec	Year
Mean daily maximum °C (°F)	19.2 (66.6)	22.1 (71.8)	27.4 (81.3)	33.7 (92.7)	39.1 (102.4)	41.1 (106.0)	36.3 (97.3)	34.6 (94.3)	35.1 (95.2)	33.1 (91.6)	27.2 (81.0)	21.2 (70.2)	30.8 (87.5)
Daily mean °C (°F)	12.4 (54.3)	15.1 (59.2)	20.3 (68.5)	26 (79)	31.1 (88.0)	34 (93)	31.4 (88.5)	30.2 (86.4)	29.4 (84.9)	25.3 (77.5)	18.7 (65.7)	13.5 (56.3)	24.0 (75.1)
Mean daily minimum °C (°F)	5.6 (42.1)	8.1 (46.6)	13.3 (55.9)	18.4 (65.1)	23.2 (73.8)	26.9 (80.4)	26.6 (79.9)	25.8 (78.4)	23.8 (74.8)	17.6 (63.7)	10.2 (50.4)	5.8 (42.4)	17.1 (62.8)
Average precipitation mm (inches)	38 (1.5)	37 (1.5)	36 (1.4)	21 (0.8)	19 (0.7)	47 (1.9)	242 (9.5)	225 (8.9)	93 (3.7)	12 (0.5)	5 (0.2)	18 (0.7)	793 (31.3)

== Demography ==
Population

Historical population

Year	Pop.	±%
1951	46,971	—
1961	59,608	+26.9%
1972	100,333	+68.3%
1981	155,058	+54.5%

Year	Pop.	±%
1998	251,792	+62.4%
2017	390,533	+55.1%
2023	574,240	+47.0%

According to the 2023 census, Gujrat city had a population of 574,240.

=== Religion ===
Religious groups in Gujrat City (1881−2023) (Note: 1881-1941: Data for the entirety of the town of Gujrat, which included Gujrat Municipality and Gujrat Civil Lines. 2017-2023: Urban population of Gujrat Tehsil.)
Religious group	1881		1891		1901		1911		1921		1931		1941		2017		2023	
Religious group	Pop.	%	Pop.	%	Pop.	%	Pop.	%	Pop.	%	Pop.	%	Pop.	%	Pop.	%	Pop.	%
Islam	13,637	72.76%	12,824	71.05%	14,047	72.37%	14,253	74.66%	16,284	74.11%	19,482	73.49%	24,681	79.88%	532,896	98.19%	917,696	98.54%
Hinduism (Note: 1931-1941: Including Ad-Dharmis)	4,762	25.41%	4,703	26.06%	4,823	24.85%	4,226	22.14%	5,016	22.83%	5,984	22.57%	5,011	16.22%	30	0.01%	55	0.01%
Sikhism	317	1.69%	452	2.5%	415	2.14%	495	2.59%	486	2.21%	659	2.49%	630	2.04%	—N/a	—N/a	18	0%
Jainism	0	0%	0	0%	0	0%	0	0%	4	0.02%	0	0%	10	0.03%	—N/a	—N/a	—N/a	—N/a
Christianity	—N/a	—N/a	71	0.39%	125	0.64%	116	0.61%	184	0.84%	386	1.46%	553	1.79%	9,121	1.68%	12,450	1.34%
Ahmadiyya	—N/a	—N/a	—N/a	—N/a	—N/a	—N/a	—N/a	—N/a	—N/a	—N/a	—N/a	—N/a	—N/a	—N/a	659	659%	1,026	0.11%
Others	27	0.14%	0	0%	0	0%	0	0%	0	0%	0	0%	14	0.05%	2	0%	34	0%
Total population	18,743	100%	18,050	100%	19,410	100%	19,090	100%	21,974	100%	26,511	100%	30,899	100%	542,708	100%	931,279	100%

=== Language ===
Urban population of Gujrat Metropolitan Corporation
1. Punjabi (89.5%)
2. Urdu (6.20%)
3. Pashto (3.30%)
4. Others (1.00%)

Gujrat is overwhelmingly Punjabi speaking, with Punjabi constituting 89.5% of the population. Urdu speakers form 6.2%, and Pashto speakers make up 3.3%. While an additional 1% of the population consists of other languages (Mostly Saraiki and Balochi). (Note: Urban population of Gujrat Tehsil includes the population of Jalalpur Jattan and Kunjah along with Gujrat city)

== Education ==
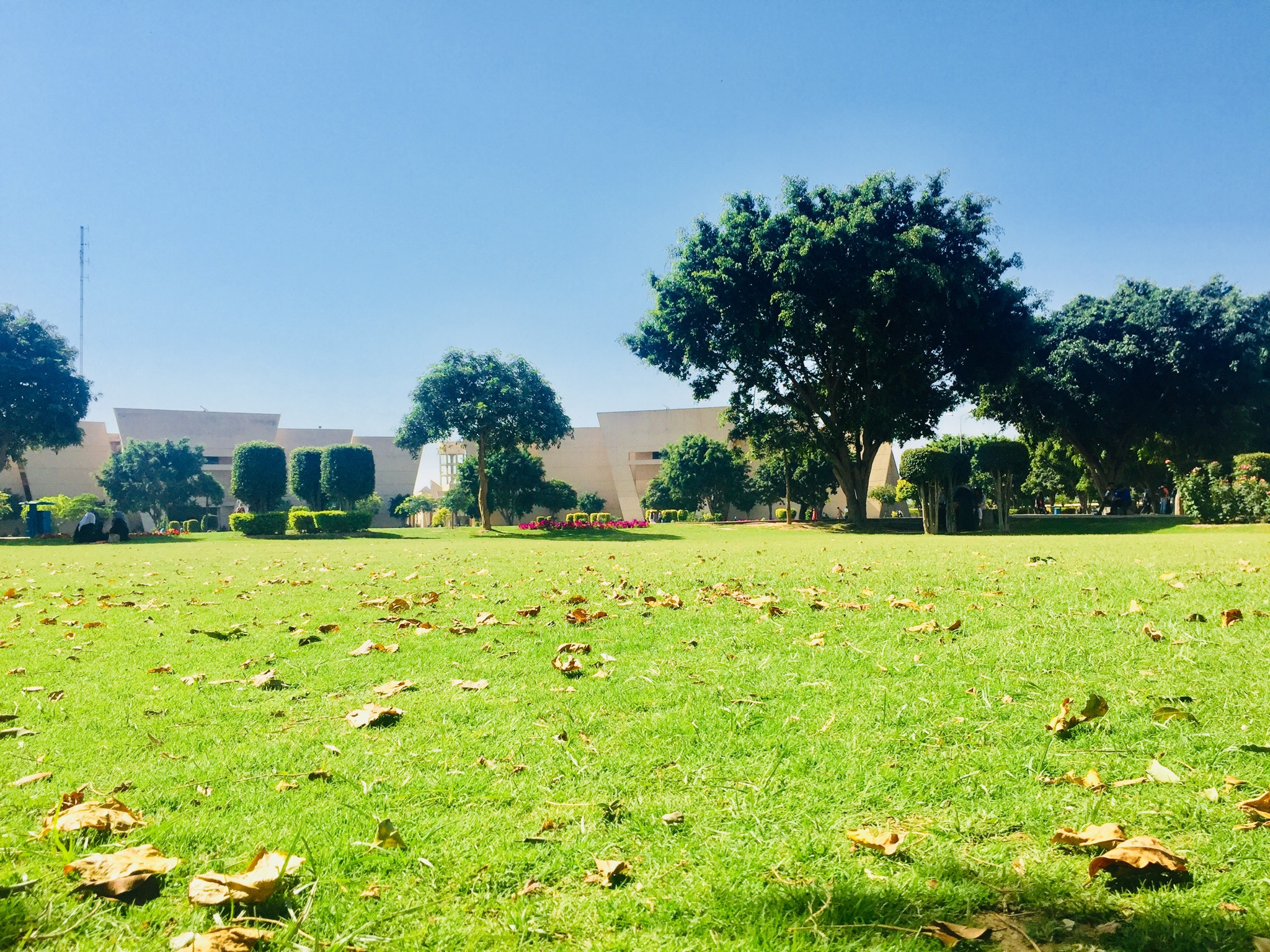
University of Gujrat garden

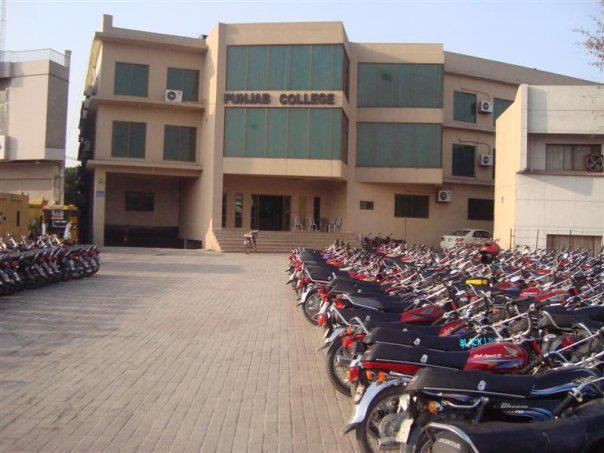
Punjab College of Science, Gujrat Campus

Some of the notable educational institutes of Gujrat include:

- Beaconhouse School System
- Dar-e-Arqam Schools
- Lahore Grammar School
- Nawaz Sharif Medical College
- Pakistan International Public School, Gujrat Campus
- The Superior University, Lahore, Gujrat Campus
- University of Central Punjab
- University of Gujrat
- University of Lahore

== Notable people ==
- Fazal Elahi Chaudhry, 5th President of Pakistan (1973–1978); former Speaker of the National Assembly (1972–1973), Deputy Speaker of the National Assembly (1965–1969), and Speaker of the West Pakistan Assembly (1956–1958); born in Kharian, Gujrat District.
- Qamar Zaman Kaira, former Federal Minister for Information and Broadcasting, 2009–2011 and 2012–2013; former Federal Minister for Kashmir Affairs and Gilgit-Baltistan, 2008–2013; former Governor of Gilgit-Baltistan; former Member of the National Assembly, 2002–2007 and 2008–2013; born in Lalamusa, Gujrat District.
- Chaudhry Hussain Elahi, Member of the National Assembly of Pakistan
- Chaudhry Pervaiz Elahi, former deputy prime minister of Pakistan, former Chief Minister of Punjab, Speaker of the Provincial Assembly of Punjab, August 2018–present, previously 1997–1999; former chairman of District Council, Gujrat; former Provincial Minister for Local Government and Rural Development
- Chaudhry Zahoor Elahi, Member of the National Assembly of Pakistan in 1962 and 1970; Deputy Opposition Leader in the National Assembly of Pakistan 1972–1977; Federal Minister for Manpower, Labor, Local Government & Rural Development 1978–1979
- Moonis Elahi, former Federal Minister for Water Resources, Member of the National Assembly of Pakistan, twice elected as the member of the Provincial Assembly of Punjab, 2008–2013 and 2013–2018
- Syed Munir Hussain Gilani, Pakistani politician
- Nawabzada Ghazanfar Ali Gul, former Adviser to Prime Minister of Pakistan
- Imam Din Gujrati, humorous poet of Urdu and Punjabi
- Abdullah Hussain, writer
- Chaudhry Shujaat Hussain, former prime minister of Pakistan, Member Pakistan Majlis-e-Shura; re-elected five times as Member of the National Assembly of Pakistan; re-elected twice as Member of the Senate of Pakistan; former Federal Minister for Interior, Information, Industries & Production; "Honorary Consul General" of the Republic of Korea
- Chaudhry Wajahat Hussain, former Federal Minister for Overseas Pakistanis; Federal Minister for Labour and Manpower and Federal Minister for Human Resource Development; three times MPA and two times MNA
- Orya Maqbool Jan, social analyst
- Saleem Sarwar Jaura, former Member of the Provincial Assembly of Punjab
- Muhammad Afzal Lone, lawyer and judge
- Mian Imran Masood, former MPA of Gujrat and Minister of Education Punjab
- Ahmad Mukhtar, former Minister for Defence, Government of Pakistan
- Shujaat Nawaz, former Member of the Provincial Assembly of Punjab
- Yasmin Qureshi, British MP
- Muhammad Abdullah Warraich, Member of the Provincial Assembly of Punjab
