= Gujrat Fort =

Fort in Gujrat, Pakistan

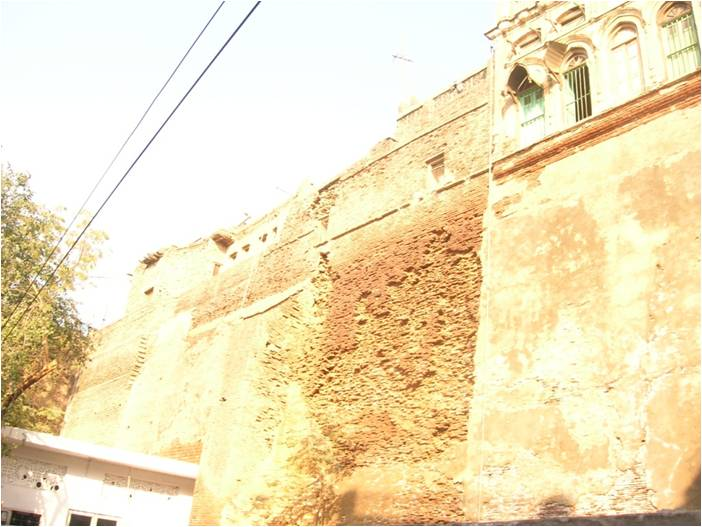
- Interactive map of the Gujrat Fort area

General information
- Location: Gujrat, Punjab, Pakistan
- Coordinates: 32°34′29″N 74°04′36″E

Gujrat Fort, also known as Akbari Fort, is a fort in Gujrat, in Punjab, Pakistan.

== History ==
During 1587 or 1596–97, Mughal Emperor Akbar commissioned the construction of a fort in Gujrat, which included five gates. This fortified settlement housed all city inhabitants and entry or exit was restricted after nightfall for security reasons.

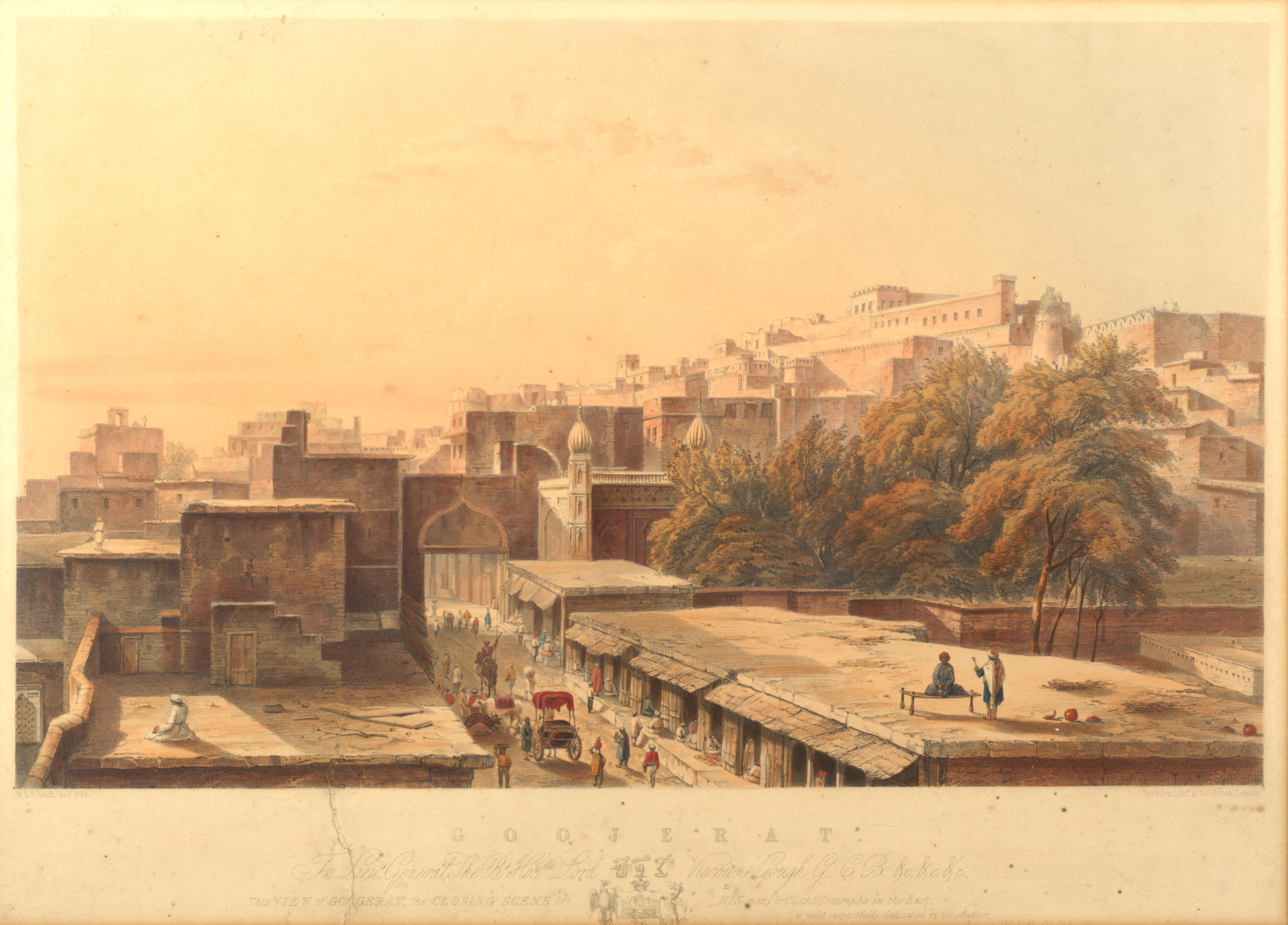
The fort of Gujrat, Punjab, lithograph by Lieutenant W. L. D. Smith, after his own painting, Day & Son, London, 1849

== Gates ==
The gates bear unique names reflecting their respective histories and orientations. The eastern Shah Daula Gate, or Shahdauli Gate, pays tribute to saint Kabiruddin Shahdoula Daryai.

The westward-facing gate, known as Kabuli or Dhakki Gate, derives its name from its direction towards Kabul.

In the North stands the Sheeshiyan Wala Gate, famed for its decorative glasswork roof. "Shishi," a Scandinavian term signifying graveyard, possibly indicates the gate's proximity to a burial site.

The southern gate, originally termed Kalari Gate, is now known as Shah Faisal Gate, named after three neighboring southern villages: Kalara Dewan Singh, Kalara Rahwala, and Kalara Punawan.

Lastly, the Timble Gate, situated adjacent to the Shahdauli gate, completes the quintet of these historical entrances.
