= NA-63 Gujrat-II =

Constituency of the National Assembly of Pakistan

- Constituency for the National Assembly of Pakistan
- Region: Jalalpur Jattan Tehsil and Gujrat Tehsil (partly) of Gujrat District
- Electorate: 527,959

Current constituency
- Party: Pakistan Muslim League (Q)
- Member: Chaudhry Hussain Elahi
- Created from: NA-104 Gujrat-I

NA-63 Gujrat-II (این اے-63، گجرات-2) is a constituency for the National Assembly of Pakistan which includes Jalalpur Jattan.

== Members of Parliament ==
=== 2018–2023: NA-68 Gujrat-I ===
| Election | Member | Party |
|---|---|---|
| 2018 | Chaudhry Hussain Elahi | PML (Q) |

=== 2018–2023: NA-63 Gujrat-II ===
| Election | Member | Party |
|---|---|---|
| 2024 | Chaudhry Hussain Elahi | PML (Q) |

== Election 2002 ==
General elections were held on 10 October 2002. Chaudhry Wajahat Hussain of PML-Q won by 82,126 votes.

General election 2002: NA-104 Gujrat-I
| Party | Candidate | Votes | % | ±% |
|---|---|---|---|---|
| PML(Q) | Ch. Wajahat Hussain | 82,126 | 53.33 | |
| PPP | Nawabzada Ghazanfar Ali Gul | 62,651 | 40.68 | |
| MMA | Muhammad Liaqat Ali Naqshbandi | 5,587 | 3.63 | |
| PAT | Gulrez Mehmood Akhtar Warraich | 2,285 | 1.48 | |
| Others | Others (two candidates) | 1,360 | 0.88 | |
| Turnout | | 158,322 | 52.08 | |
| Total valid votes | | 154,009 | 97.28 | |
| Rejected ballots | | 4,313 | 2.72 | |
| Majority | | 19,475 | 12.65 | |
| Registered electors | | 303,985 | | |

== Election 2008 ==
General elections were held on 18 February 2008. Chaudhry Wajahat Hussain of PML-Q won by 96,379 votes.

General election 2008: NA-104 Gujrat-I
| Party | Candidate | Votes | % | ±% |
|---|---|---|---|---|
| PML(Q) | Ch. Wajahat Hussain | 96,379 | 56.58 | |
| PPP | Nawabzada Ghazanfar Ali Gul | 63,374 | 37.20 | |
| PML(N) | Syed Faisal Abbas | 8,927 | 5.24 | |
| Others | Others (two candidates) | 1,668 | 0.98 | |
| Turnout | | 173,934 | 55.87 | |
| Total valid votes | | 170,348 | 97.94 | |
| Rejected ballots | | 3,586 | 2.06 | |
| Majority | | 33,005 | 19.38 | |
| Registered electors | | 311,343 | | |
| PML(Q) hold | | | | |

== Election 2013 ==
General elections were held on 11 May 2013. Nawabzada Mazher Ali, brother of Nawabzada Gazanfar Ali Gul of PPP contested under the ticket of PML-N and won the seat by 85,113 votes and became the member of National Assembly.

General election 2013: NA-104 Gujrat-I
| Party | Candidate | Votes | % | ±% |
|---|---|---|---|---|
| PML(N) | Nawabzada Mazher Ali | 85,113 | 42.54 | |
| PML(Q) | Ch. Wajahat Hussain | 81,231 | 40.60 | |
| PTI | Ch. Usman Ali Tariq | 19,318 | 9.65 | |
| Others | Others (eleven candidates) | 14,433 | 7.21 | |
| Turnout | | 206,548 | 55.08 | |
| Total valid votes | | 200,095 | 96.88 | |
| Rejected ballots | | 6,453 | 3.12 | |
| Majority | | 3,882 | 1.94 | |
| Registered electors | | 374,975 | | |
| PML(N) gain from PML(Q) | | | | |

== Election 2018 ==
General elections were held on 25 July 2018.

General election 2018: NA-68 Gujrat-I
| Party | Candidate | Votes | % | ±% |
|---|---|---|---|---|
| PML(Q) | Chaudhry Hussain Elahi | 104,678 | 43.50 | |
| PML(N) | Nawabzada Ghazanfar Ali Gul | 68,810 | 28.59 | |
| TLP | Muhammad Mehmood Qadri | 43,831 | 18.21 | |
| Others | Others (eight candidates) | 16,999 | 7.06 | |
| Turnout | | 240,652 | 53.01 | |
| Rejected ballots | | 6,334 | 2.64 | |
| Majority | | 35,868 | 14.91 | |
| Registered electors | | 453,990 | | |
| PML(Q) gain from PML(N) | | | | |

== Election 2024 ==
General elections were held on 8 February 2024. Chaudhry Hussain Elahi won the election with 87,567 votes.

General election 2024: NA-63 Gujrat-II
| Party | Candidate | Votes | % | ±% |
|---|---|---|---|---|
| PML(Q) | Chaudhry Hussain Elahi | 87,567 | 33.02 | ▼10.48 |
| Independent | Sajid Yousaf (Note: Filed nomination papers as PTI candidate but ECP allowed him to run as an Independent) | 82,176 | 30.98 | N/A |
| PML(N) | Nawabzada Ghazanfar Ali Gul | 56,870 | 21.44 | ▼7.15 |
| TLP | Muhammad Mehmood Qadri | 28,098 | 10.59 | ▼7.62 |
| Others | Others (ten candidates) | 10,512 | 3.96 | |
| Turnout | | 271,087 | 51.35 | ▼1.66 |
| Total valid votes | | 265,223 | 97.84 | |
| Rejected ballots | | 5,864 | 2.16 | |
| Majority | | 5,391 | 2.03 | ▼12.88 |
| Registered electors | | 527,959 | | |
| PML(Q) hold | | | | |

== See also ==
- NA-62 Gujrat-I
- NA-64 Gujrat-III
