= Chaudhry Hussain Elahi =

Pakistani politician

Chaudhry Hussain Ellahi

Member of the National Assembly of Pakistan
- Incumbent
- Assumed office 29 February 2024
- Constituency: NA-63 Gujrat-II
- In office 13 August 2018 – 10 August 2023
- Constituency: NA-68 (Gujrat-I)

Personal details
- Party: PMLN (2026-present)
- Other political affiliations: PML(Q) (2023-2026); PTI (2022-2023)
- Parent: Chaudhry Wajahat Hussain (father)
- Relatives: Chaudhry Family
- Education: Northeastern University

Chaudhry Hussain Ellahi (Urdu: چوہدری حسین الہی) is a Pakistani politician who had been a member of the National Assembly of Pakistan since February 2024 and previously served in this position from August 2018 till August 2023. He is the elder son of the former federal minister of Pakistan Chaudhry Wajahat Hussain. He is the current member of the Pakistan Muslim League (Q).

== Education ==
He graduated from Northeastern University in 2014.

== Political career ==
He was elected to the National Assembly of Pakistan as a candidate of Pakistan Muslim League (Q) (PML-Q) from constituency NA-68 (Gujrat-I) in the 2018 Pakistani general election.

However, Chaudhary Hussain Elahi announced his resignation from PML-Q on 10 June 2022.

Chaudhary Hussain Elahi announced his resignation from PTI and joined the PML-Q on 24 May 2023 in a press conference from London.
