= Warraich (clan) =

Jat clan of Pakistan and India

Warraich or Waraich is a Jat clan found in Pakistani Punjab and the Indian states of Punjab and Haryana. In Pakistan, this tribe or clan is mostly found in Gujrat District, Mandi Bahauddin District and Gujranwala Districts of Punjab, Pakistan.
