= Nawabzada Ghazanfar Ali Gul =

Lawyer-cum-Politician

Nawabzada Gazanfar Ali Gul

Federal Minister of Pakistan

Nawabzada Ghazanfar Ali Gul is a senior member of the Nawabzada family of Gujrat, Pakistan. Ghazanfar previously served as Federal Minister of Pakistan as well was member of National Assembly of Pakistan and Provincial Assembly of Punjab. Ghazanfar is a well-known political figure of Gujrat, an active Advocate in the Lahore High Court and leader of Pakistan Peoples Party, Pakistan's second largest political party.

Gazanfar Ali Gul attended the Government College, Lahore where he achieved the Role of honour in debating. After completing his studies in Government College University, Gazanfar Ali Gul moved to the United Kingdom for further studies. Where he enrolled at the London School of Economics, graduating in a B.Sc. in Economics degree. After graduating, Gazanfar Ali Gul returned to Pakistan and again back to the United Kingdom to achieve his Post Graduate Diploma in Law from Thames Valley University. He then qualified as a barrister at Lincoln's Inn.

Gazanfar Ali Gul returned to his hometown and entered politics in 1985. They have long history of involvement in politics and had always supported the Pakistan Peoples Party (PPP). However, at this time the PPP had decided to boycott the elections that were being held under the dictatorship of General Zia-ul-Haq, the then President of Pakistan.

Gazanfar Ali Gul contested the 1988 general election and won his place as an MPA. His political sharpness and leadership qualities were noted by the former Prime Minister, Benazir Bhutto, who offered him the chance of being a MNA. In 1993, Gazanfar Ali Gul defeated Chaudhry Shujaat Hussain and Bhutto appointed him to be a member of the highest committee of the PPP, the Central Executive Committee.

Gazanfar Ali Gul's family has been in rivalry with the Chaudhry family of Gujrat for over five decades. Gazanfar Ali Gul was defeated by Chaudhry Wajahat Hussain, the brother of Chaudhry Shujaat Hussain, in the elections of 2002 and 2008. After the latter, Ghazanfar filed a case against Hussain, claiming that the votes needed to be recounted due to irregularities. In 2017, he joined the PML-N. He contested the elections of 2018 on the PMLN ticket, and he lost the election from Chaudhary Hussain Elahi of PML-Q and PTI.
