= Chaudhry Salik Hussain =

Pakistani politician

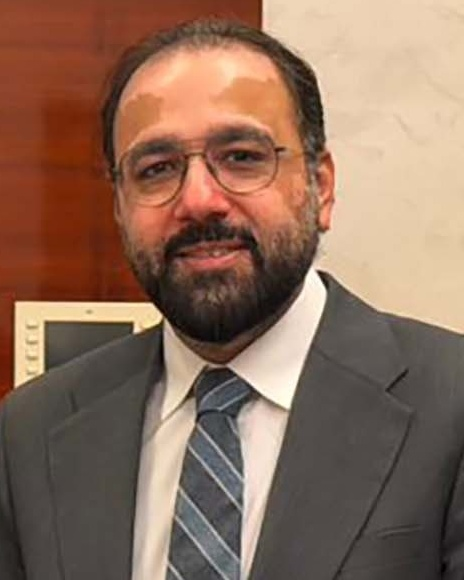
- Salik in 2026

Ministry of Religious Affairs and Inter-faith Harmony
- In office 4 April 2024 – 25 February 2025
- President: Asif Ali Zardari
- Prime Minister: Shehbaz Sharif
- Preceded by: Aniq Ahmed (Caretaker)
- Succeeded by: Sardar Muhammad Yousuf

Ministry of Overseas Pakistanis and Human Resource Development
- Incumbent
- Assumed office 11 March 2024
- President: Asif Ali Zardari
- Prime Minister: Shehbaz Sharif
- Preceded by: Sarfraz Bugti; Aun Chaudhry; Chaudhry Hussain Elahi

Member of the National Assembly of Pakistan
- Incumbent
- Assumed office 29 February 2024
- Constituency: NA-64 Gujrat-III
- In office 29 October 2018 – 10 October 2023
- Constituency: NA-65 (Chakwal-II)

Personal details
- Born: January 29, 1979 (age 47) Chakwal, Punjab, Pakistan
- Party: PML(Q) (2018-present)
- Parent: Shujaat Hussain (father)
- Relatives: Chaudhry family

Chaudhry Salik Hussain is a Pakistani politician who is the current Federal Minister for Overseas Pakistanis and Human Resource Development, in office since March 2024. He has been a member of the National Assembly of Pakistan since October 2018.

In 2024, Salik faced a lot of criticism when it caused disagreements within the family and he created a political front against his cousin, Moonis Elahi.

He was also held responsible for the police attack on the Chaudhry family's palace-like residence spread over several acres in Lahore, in which several parts of the house were set on fire.

== Political career ==
He was elected to the National Assembly of Pakistan as a candidate of Pakistan Muslim League (Q) (PML-Q) from Constituency NA-65 (Chakwal-II) in by-election held on 14 October 2018.

On 22 April 2022, he was sworn in as the Federal Minister in the cabinet of Prime Minister Shehbaz Sharif. He served without a portfolio for nearly three weeks before being appointed as the Federal Minister for the Board of Investment. He was reportedly tasked with overseeing Chinese and other foreign direct investments and implementing special measures in this regard.

He was re-elected to the National Assembly as a candidate of PML-Q from Constituency NA-64 Gujrat-III in the 2024 Pakistani general election. He received 105,205 votes and defeated Independent politician candidate and his aunt, Qaisara Ealhi, supported by Pakistan Tehreek-e-Insaf, who secured 80,946 votes.

On 11 March, he was inducted into the federal cabinet of Prime Minister Shehbaz Sharif and was appointed as Federal Minister for Overseas Pakistanis and Human Resource Development. On 4 April, he was given the additional ministerial portfolio of Religious Affairs and Inter-faith Harmony.

== Court approves to shut two NAB references against Chaudhry Brothers ==
The Lahore Accountability Court on Monday has approved to close two references against Chaudhary Brothers about assets beyond means case. Court agreed on the closure of inquiry against 12 family members including Chaudhry Shujaat Hussain, Chaudhry Pervaiz Elahi, Chaudhry Monis Elahi and Chaudhry Shafi Hussain. NAB Lahore had approached the accountability court to close the inquiry against Chaudhry Shujaat Hussain, Chaudhry Salik Hussain and Chaudhry Shafay Hussain. According to NAB Prosecutor Asadullah Khan, Chaudhry Shujaat Hussain and his sons were being investigated in the case of assets beyond means. According to NAB Prosecutor Asadullah Khan, Chaudhry Shujaat Hussain and his sons were being investigated for assets more than their income. “No evidence was found against Chaudhry Shujaat Hussain and his sons in the assets case during the inspection”, the prosecutor added. According to the NAB prosecutor, three different inquiries against the Chaudhry brothers were pending in the NAB. Chaudhry Shujaat Hussain, as the Federal Minister of Revenue, was accused of making assets beyond his income. Chaudhry Pervez Elahi as Speaker Punjab Assembly was accused of making assets over income. Earlier, an investigation was launched on April 12, 2000, against Chaudhry Shujaat and Speaker Punjab Assembly Chaudhry Pervez Elahi and others. Inquiries were moved to NAB Lahore on March 11, 2015. On January 19, 2021, the NAB Chairman had approved the closure of inquiries against the Chaudhry brothers.
