= Kunjah =

Kunjah کنجاہ
- City
- Location within Punjab, Pakistan Location within Pakistan
- Coordinates: 32°31′46.9″N 73°58′27.1″E
- Country: Pakistan
- Province: Punjab
- District: Gujrat

Government
  - Type: Municipal Committee
  - Municipal Officer: Zeeshan
- Elevation: 217 m (712 ft)

Population (2023)
  - Total: 90,905
- Demonym: Kunjahi
- Time zone: UTC+5 (PST)
- Calling code: 053
- Number of Union Councils: 1

Kunjah (Punjabi and Urdu: کنجاہ) is a city in Gujrat District of Punjab, Pakistan. It is also the city where Major Shabir shareef Shaheed a recipient of Nishan-e-haider belonged to.

== History ==
Various accounts date the founding of Kunjah anywhere from the 4th century BCE during the time of Alexander the Great to the 8th century CE. Kunjah is named after a raja named Kunjpal who is also often credited to be the founder of the town. Islam was brought to the region by the Umayyad Caliphate early in the 8th century and soon replaced Buddhism as the dominant religion. Kunjah grew in prominence in the 9th and 10th centuries.

Starting during the Muslim period, Kunjah was considered a strategically important town. Ibrahim Bin Masood used Kunjah as his main base for his attack on neighboring districts. In the Mughal period, Emperor Aurangzeb also visited Kunjah, and during his stay in Kunjah built a mosque that is now named after him.

Kunjah prospered during the time of the Sikh Empire. Maharaja Ranjit Singh granted Kunjah and several villages as jagir to one of his most trusted officers, Diwan Moti Ram. The place was Moti Ram's ancestral hometown and worth over three lakh rupees annually. His family built a number of gardens and a baradari that still stands. Also to be found are two royal palaces and a royal bathing pool connected by tunnels.

== Demographics ==
=== Population ===
Historical population
Year	Pop.	±% p.a.
1951	8,822	—
1961	9,887	+1.15%
1972	13,342	+2.76%
1981	16,366	+2.30%
1998	24,338	+2.36%
2017	32,588	+1.55%
2023	90,905	+18.65%

As of the 2023 census, Kunjah has a population of 90,905.

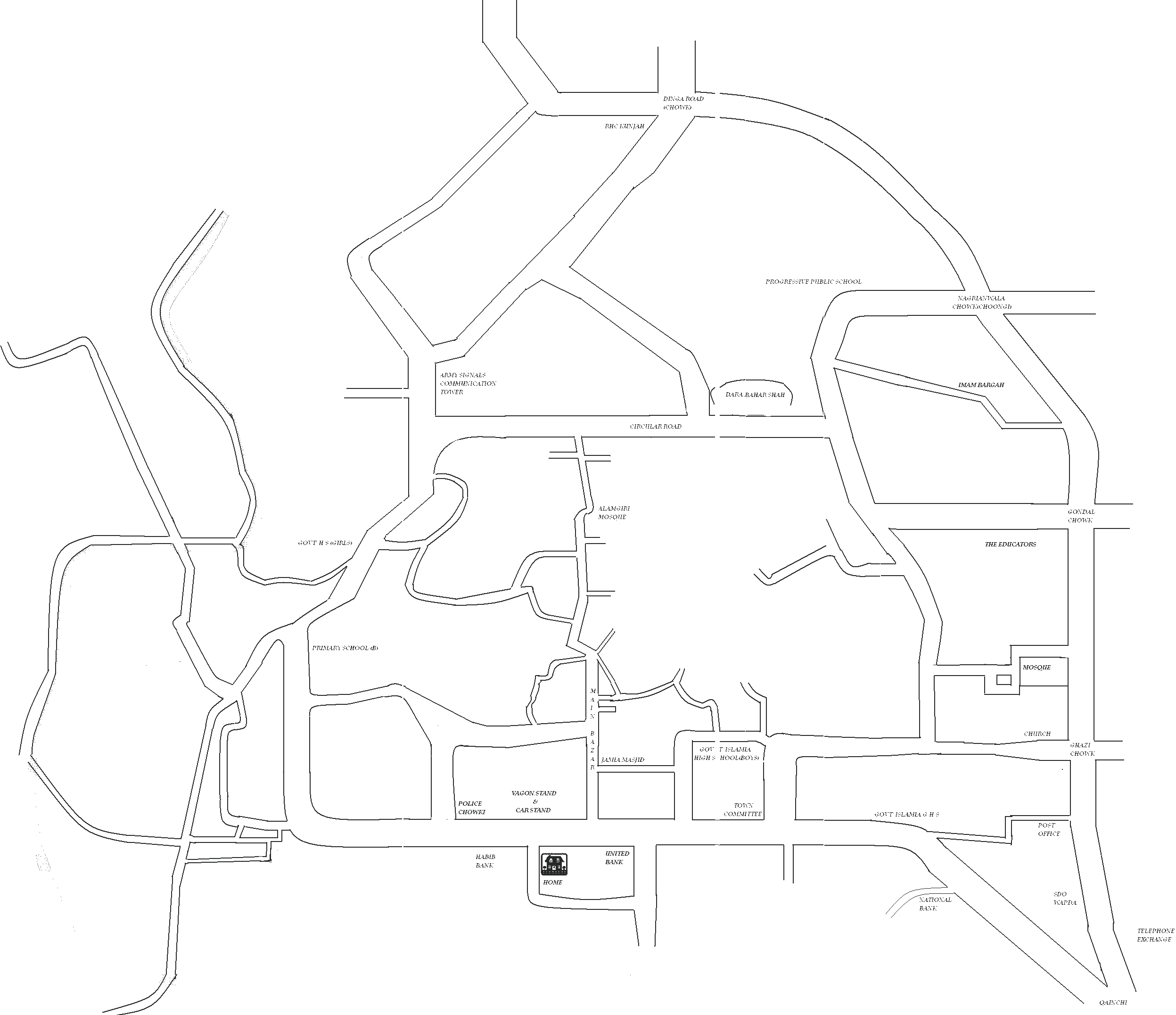
Kunjah street map in 2007

Languages

Languages of Kunjah city (2023 Census)
1. Punjabi (93.1%)
2. Urdu (4.10%)
3. Pashto (1.80%)
4. Others (1.00%)

Religions

The main religion is Sunni Islam, with a small Shi'a and a few Christians. There are about 50 mosques, one imambargah and one church and one temple. Many residents live abroad, mainly in the UK, Italy, Spain and Greece.

== Politics and government ==
Kunjah lies in the NA-69 (Gujrat-II) (previously NA 105) of Punjab for the National Assembly elections and PP-30 (Gujrat-III) (previously PP 110) for the provincial assembly of Punjab. In the 2018 elections Moonis Elahi was elected from NA 69 seat and Chaudhry Pervaiz Elahi has been elected a member of the Punjab Assembly from PP 30 seat. From 2013 to 2018 Chaudhry Pervaiz Elahi and Moonis Elahi have been members of the National Assembly and Provincial Assembly respectively.

Aside from the local government and a regional police station, a police post in the centre of the city the national government is represented by a military signals station and a WAPDA subdivision.

== Education ==
The government operates seven schools: two primary schools for boys, two high schools for girls and one for boys, a boys higher secondary school and a girls degree college.

== Economy ==
Most economic activity revolves around agriculture. The primary crops are wheat, rice, tobacco and vegetables. Farms are supplied with irrigation from the Upper Jhelum Canal, and tobacco production is supported by two tobacco factories and a research substation. The main bazaar is a regional trade centre consisting of 500 shops.

== Culture ==
People of Kunjah believed that The famous Sohni among the Sohni Mahiwal folklore came from Kunjah but the intellectual Dr. Qureshi Ahmad Hussain Qiladari had other ideas and he contradicted from this myth. For now Kunjah has a modest type of culture i.e. it is semi-urban type. Both men and women wear shalwar qameez.

== Fairs and festivals ==
An annual fair is held in Kunjah on 4 August. It is held at the shrine of a cleric Shah Shujah Bukhari so it is also known to be an urs. Other festivals are also held but they are losing their touch nowadays due to the busy lives of the modern days and children getting more interested in the TV films and Computer Games rather than the oldies.

== Notable people from Kunjah ==
- Ghanimat Kunjahi, Persian-language poet and Sufi in the Mughal empire during the reign of Emperor Aurangzeb
- Baisakhi Mal, tradesman and father to Dewan Mokham Chand a member of Maharaja Ranjit Singh's Generals and commander-in-chief in the Battle of Attock.
- Moti Ram, administrator and son of Dewan Mokham Chand a prominent member of Ranjit Singh's court, Jagirdar of Kunjah.
- Diwan Ram Dayal, the oldest son of Moti Ram, died young but went down in the annals of Sikh history as a courageous general.
- Diwan Kirpa Ram, the youngest son of Moti Ram, was the governor of Kashmir during the reign of Maharaja Ranjit Singh.
- Major Shabbir Sharif Shaheed, holder of the Nishan-e-Haider, Pakistan's highest military award for bravery.
- Ex-General Raheel Sharif, brother of Major Shabir Sharif, and ex-Army Chief of Staff of Pakistan.
- Shareef Kunjahi, (1915–2007) was one of the leading writers and poets of Punjabi language. He was among the first faculty members of the Department of Punjabi Language, University of Punjab in the 1970s and contributed to Punjabi literature as a poet, prose writer, teacher, research scholar, linguist
