= Shujaat Hussain =

Pakistani politician (born 1940)

- شجاعت حسین
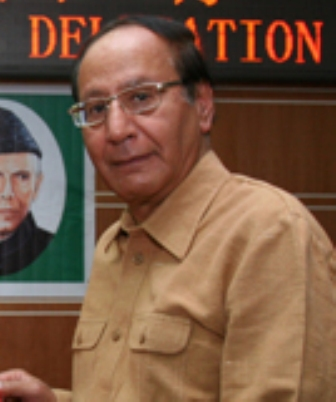
- Hussain in 2013

14th Prime Minister of Pakistan
- In office 30 June 2004 – 26 August 2004
- President: Pervez Musharraf
- Preceded by: Zafarullah Khan Jamali
- Succeeded by: Shaukat Aziz

Leader of Pakistan Muslim League (Q)
- Incumbent
- Assumed office 1 January 2003
- Preceded by: Mian Muhammad Azhar; Chaudhry Salik Hussain

27th & 29th Minister of Interior
- In office 25 February 1997 – 12 October 1999
- Prime Minister: Nawaz Sharif
- Preceded by: Omar Khan Afridi (Acting)
- Succeeded by: Moinuddin Haider
- In office 9 November 1990 – 18 July 1993
- Prime Minister: Nawaz Sharif; Balakh Sher Mazari (Acting); Nawaz Sharif
- Preceded by: Mian Zahid Sarfraz (Acting)
- Succeeded by: Fateh Khan Bandial (Acting)

Minister for Railways
- In office 7 August 1998 – 9 November 1999
- President: Rafiq Tarar
- Prime Minister: Nawaz Sharif
- Preceded by: Sardar Muhammad Yaqub Khan Nasar
- Succeeded by: Lt. Gen. R. Javed Ashraf

Chairman Senate Committees on Defence Production and Aviation
- In office 1993–1997

Federal Minister for Defence Production
- In office 1987–1988
- President: Muhammad Zia-ul-Haq
- Prime Minister: Muhammad Khan Junejo

Federal Minister for Information and Broadcasting
- In office 1986–1988
- President: Muhammad Zia-ul-Haq
- Prime Minister: Muhammad Khan Junejo

Federal Minister for Industries and Production
- In office 1985–1988
- President: Muhammad Zia-ul-Haq
- Prime Minister: Muhammad Khan Junejo

Member of the Senate of Pakistan (Senator from Punjab)
- In office 2009–2015
- In office 1993–1997
- Constituency: Punjab, Pakistan

Member of the National Assembly of Pakistan
- In office 2002–2007
- Constituency: NA-105 (Gujrat-I)
- In office 1997–1999
- In office 1990–1993
- In office 1988–1990
- In office 1985–1988
- Constituency: NA-105 (Gujrat-I)

Personal details
- Born: 27 January 1946 (age 80) Gujrat, Punjab, British India
- Party: PML(Q) (2003–present)
- Other political affiliations: PMLN (1993–2002); IJI (1988–1993); PML (1962-1988)
- Children: 3 inc. Salik and Shafay
- Parent: Chaudhry Zahoor Elahi (father)
- Relatives: Chaudhry family
- Education: Forman Christian College; University of Punjab

Chaudhry Shujaat Hussain (Urdu: چودھری شجاعت حسین, born 27 January 1946) is a Pakistani politician who served as 14th prime minister of Pakistan. Hussain is the party president of the PML(Q) since 2003.

Hailing from the business-industrialist Chaudhry family from the Punjab province of Pakistan, Hussain graduated from the Forman Christian College University and the University of Punjab. After his graduation, Hussain subsequently joined the family business comprising large numbers of industries, textiles, agricultural farms, sugar and flour mills. He successfully contested in the non-partisan 1985 elections and was appointed as minister of industry in the government of Prime minister Muhammad Junejo, lasting until 1988. Hussain became a leader and influential conservative figure in the Islamic Democratic Alliance (IDA) between 1988 and 1990 and joined the Pakistan Muslim League (PML) under Nawaz Sharif in 1993. Hussain served as the 26th Interior minister in the government of Prime minister Nawaz Sharif in two non-consecutive terms from 1990 to 1993 and 1997 to 1999.

Originally a loyalist of Nawaz Sharif, Hussain defected to autocratic leader Pervez Musharraf after 1999 and became member of the new PML-Q.

His family remains influential in national politics and his cousin and brother-in-law Pervez Illahi served as Chief Minister of Punjab 2007 Twice, from 2002 to 2007 during Musharraf's military rule and in 2022.

Following the 2008 elections and Musharraf's resignation, Hussain and his party became a major ally of Prime minister Yousaf Raza Gillani and President Asif Ali Zardari from the Pakistan Peoples Party.

== Early life and education ==
Chaudhry Shujaat Hussain was born on 27 January 1946 in the Gujrat District, Punjab, of former British Indian Empire. He was born in a Punjabi Jat family belonging to Warraich clan. His ancestors hailed from rural Gujrat and had no initial political background. His father Zahoor Elahi was in Punjab Police but quit the police service to establish a cotton mill. His family lost a cotton mill as a result of Indian partition but re-established the mill in Gujrat after the establishment of Pakistan in 1947. His father first contested in 1954 elections and elected a local union Councillor of the Gujrat District. After attending public schools in Gujrat, Hussain matriculated, and was accepted at the Forman Christian College University. In 1962, Hussain attended the Forman Christian College University and graduated with Bachelor of Business Administration in 1965 and pursued an MA in Industrial management in UK.

Upon returning to Pakistan, Hussain joined the family industrial conglomerate comprising industrial units in textiles, sugar, flour milling and agricultural farms in 1969. By this time, Hussain's family had become a potent industrial oligarchs and had significant influence on presidents Ayub Khan and General Yahya Khan.

== Career in national politics ==
Chaudhry Shujaat Hussain entered in the national politics after the assassination of his father. After participating in a local-body elections, Hussain became a Member of the Parliament in 1981 and, subsequently joining the Punjab government's Financial department. He participated and campaign successfully in non-partisan 1985 general elections and maintains ties with PML. His contest in the general election from Gujrat included for both seats for the National Assembly and provincial Punjab Assembly. After the elections he vacated his Punjab Assembly seat in favour of the National Assembly seat.

He became a crucial power broker in the Islamist regime Zia-ul-Haq. Hussain benefited with general Zia's economic policies. Hussain invested in industrial firms and mills. Bought Stocks at Karachi Stock Exchange, which benefited him.

After participating in 1985 general elections, Hussain joined the government of Prime Minister Muhammad Khan Junejo as the minister of the Ministry of Industry, and held additional ministerial portfolio of Ministry of Information and Mass-media Broadcasting in 1986; and Ministry of Defence Production in 1987–88.

He was imprisoned during second tenure of Bhutto in 1994 in politically-motivated cases filed by Federal Investigation Agency DG Rehman Malik.

=== Interior ministry ===
Hussain was the leading member of right-wing alliance, the Islamic Democratic Alliance (IDA) and won parliamentary seat during 1988 general elections, and headed the Parliamentary Party of Joint Opposition (PPJO) in the National Assembly from 1988 to 1990. He also acted as the parliamentary party leader of the Pakistan Muslim League (N) (PML-N) in the National Assembly.

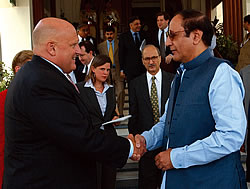
Chaudhry Shujaat Hussain, then Pakistan's Prime Minister, sees off US Deputy Secretary of State Richard Armitage, after their July 2004 meeting at the Prime Minister's residence in Islamabad, Pakistan.

After 1990 elections and 1997 elections, Chaudhry Shujaat served as Interior minister. He was one of high-profile cabinet members of Prime minister Nawaz Sharif who appointed Shujaat as the President of the PML-N in Punjab from 1997 to 1999. However, Hussain mounted serious disagreement and confronted Nawaz Sharif after Sharif imposed economic emergency in 1998. Hussain's relations became extremely hostile during the Kargil war, claiming that Sharif had been briefed by chief of army staff general Pervez Musharraf six times as opposed to Sharif claiming not having "knowledge".

=== Pakistan Muslim League ===
After the coup, Hussain did not join the Pakistan Muslim League, a splinter group of PML. In 2001, Hussain decided to defect to PML after Sharif was exiled to Saudi Arabia in 2000 and contested from Gujrat through the PML platform during the 2002 general elections. Initially, Hussain became parliamentary party leader in the National Assembly, but assumed the presidency of the party when the party's founder Mian Muhammad Azhar resigned from the party. In January 2003, Shujaat was nominated and assumed the party's presidency after succeeding Mian Muhammad Azhar on a party convention.

== Premiership (2004) ==
Chaudhry Shujaat Hussain endorsed and provided his support to appoint his lifelong friend Zafarullah Khan Jamali as country's first Baloch prime minister. Previously, he also played a role in bringing Shaukat Aziz in national politics. However, in 2004 Jamali resigned.

The military and ISI will only support and go with you as long as enough of the people are with you.... They (military) are like a horse that carries you "Only" as long as you have strength in your legs....

— Chaudhry Shujaat telling Anatol Lieven.

After Jamali's resignation, Shujaat Husain nominated Finance Minister Shaukat Aziz for the office of Prime Minister. Shujaat became Prime Minister because Aziz could not be elected Prime Minister, as he was a member of senate.

At the Parliament, Hussain told journalists that his election as Prime Minister was "not an interim appointment" but in keeping with the Constitution. In an interview, Shujaat Hussain quoted: "My nomination by Mir Zafarullah Khan Jamali and nomination of Shaukat Aziz after consulting the President were in line with the set traditions. There should be no hue and cry over such technicalities."

On 23 August 2004, Hussain handed over the office of prime minister to Shaukat Aziz, though Hussain remained the party president of the Pakistan Muslim League (Q).

=== Election as Prime Minister ===
The election for Prime Minister took place on 29 June 2004.

| ←2002 | 29 June 2004 | August 2004→ |
| Candidate | Party | Votes Obtained |
| Required majority → | | 172 out of 342 |
|---|---|---|
| Chaudhry Shujaat Hussain | Pakistan Muslim League (Q) | 190 |
| Ameen Faheem | Pakistan Peoples Party | 76 |
| Abstentions | | <76 |

== Personal life ==
Chaudhry Shujaat Hussain is the eldest son of Chaudhry Zahoor Ilahi. He has two brothers, Wajahat Hussain and Shafaat Hussain, and six sisters. One of his sisters, Qaisra Elahi, is married with his cousin, Chaudhry Pervaiz Elahi, former chief minister of Punjab. His sister Naaz Elahi is married with Tahir Sadiq Khan, former member National Assembly of Pakistan. His sister Sumaira Elahi is also active in politics. One of his sisters is married with Riaz Asghar Chaudhry, former mayor of district Mandi Bahauddin, and one of his sisters is married with Javaid Akhtar Chattha, paternal cousin of former speaker National Assembly of Pakistan Hamid Nasir Chattha.

His younger brother, Chaudhry Wajahat Hussain, has also been elected to the Provincial Assembly of the Punjab for three times (1988–1990, 1990–1993, 1997–1999) and also won from the constituency NA-104 of National Assembly in 2002 and 2008 general elections.

His Brother is Also Founder of Wajahat Force of PML-Q. A group of a few hundred people who held political and gun power in the districts of Gujrat, Mandi Bahauddin, Sargodha and Hafizabad. After the 2018 and 2024 elections, Wajahat Hussain's two sons also became members of the national and provincial assemblies.

=== Honors from South Korea ===
Hussain had been a strong and vocal supporter of Pakistan's bilateral relations with South Korea. He helped in bringing South Korea investment in the country and supports South-Korean model of economy in the country. For his efforts, the South Korean government named him "Honorary Consul General" of Republic of Korea. Hussain is also a recipient of South Korea's highest diplomatic award Order of the Diplomatic Service Merit "Ueung-in-Metal" for distinguished services in promoting mutual relations between Pakistan and Republic of Korea.

=== Wealth and personal assets ===
Chaudhry Shujaat Hussain is one of the powerful business personalities in Pakistan. Hussain is investor in defence production, military technological development, and industrial mills. On the one hand, the wealth inherited from his father and on the other hand, due to his 11 consecutive years in government from 1997 to 2008, Chaudhry made immense wealth in real estate and sugar mills. According to an estimate, in 2008, his wealth spread across Europe was estimated to be around 2.5 billion USD.

== Books ==
=== By him ===
- Sach To Yeh Hai! (سچّ تو يه هے; "This Is The Truth!"), Lahore : Firoz Shah Publications, 2018, 328 p. Autobiography.

=== About him ===
- Ch. Shujat Danishwaron Ke Nazr Maen (چوهدرى شجاعت حسين : دانشوروں کى نضر ميں; "Shujat The Man : Scholars' Eye View"), Lahore : Sanj Publications, 2020, 234 p.

== See also ==
- Chaudhry Zahoor Elahi
- Chaudhry Salik Hussain

Political offices
| Preceded by Mian Zahid Sarfraz; Acting | Minister of the Interior; 1990–1993 | Succeeded by Fateh Khan Bandial; Acting |
| Preceded by Omar Khan Affridi; Acting | Minister of the Interior; 1997–1999 | Succeeded by Moinuddin Haider |
| Preceded by Zafarullah Khan Jamali | Prime Minister of Pakistan; 2004 | Succeeded by Shaukat Aziz |
Party political offices
| Preceded by Mian Muhammad Azhar | President of the Pakistan Muslim League-Quaid; 2003–present | Incumbent |
