= Syed Faizul Hassan Shah =

Pakistani politician

Member of the National Assembly of Pakistan
- In office 13 August 2018 – 20 January 2023
- Constituency: NA-70 (Gujrat-III)

Personal details
- Party: PTI (2018-present)

Syed Faizul Hassan Shah is a Pakistani politician who had been a member of the National Assembly of Pakistan from August 2018 till January 2023.

== Political career ==
He belongs to a diverse background of Politics. He is the younger brother of former MNA Syed Manzoor Hussain Shah (Shaheed) and Ex District Naib Nazim, Ex chairman Baldia Syed Noor UL Hassan Shah (Late). He was elected to the National Assembly of Pakistan as a candidate of Pakistan Tehreek-e-Insaf (PTI) from Constituency NA-70 (Gujrat-III) in the 2018 Pakistani general election. He received 95,168 votes and defeated Chaudhry Jaffar Iqbal and Qamar Zaman Kaira.
