= Zaheer Ahmad Babar Sidhu =

16th air chief marshal of Pakistan

Zaheer Ahmad Babar Sidhu NI(M) HJ HI(M) SI(M) TI(M)
- ظہیر احمد بابر سدھو
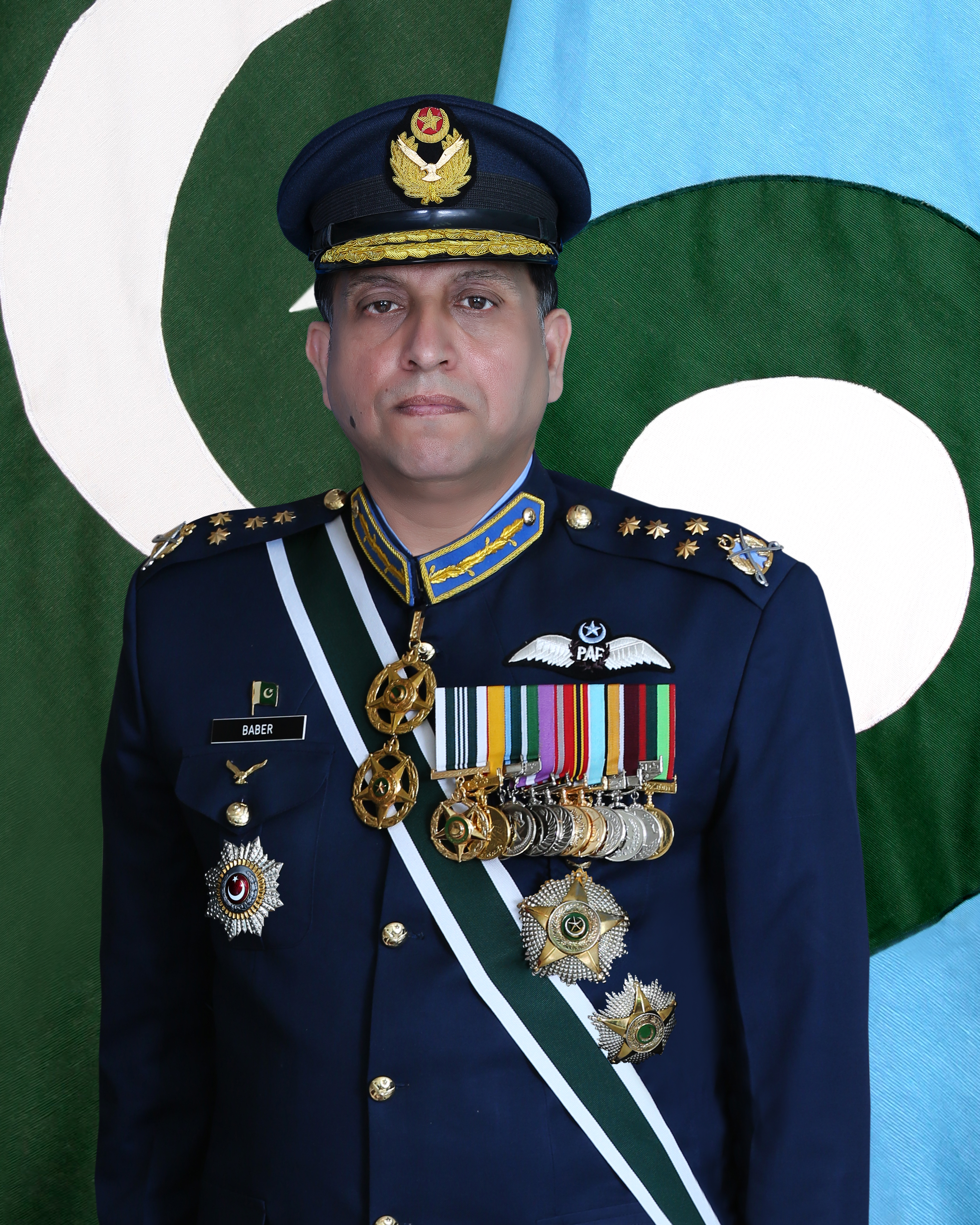
- Official portrait

16th Chief of Air Staff
- Incumbent
- Assumed office 19 March 2021
- President: Arif Alvi; Asif Ali Zardari
- Prime Minister: Imran Khan; Shehbaz Sharif; Anwar-ul-Haq Kakar (Care Taker); Shehbaz Sharif
- Preceded by: ACM Mujahid Anwar Khan

Personal details
- Born: 16 April 1965 (age 61) Sidh, Gujrat District, Punjab, Pakistan
- Education: Combat Commanders' School (PAK); Command & Staff College (UK); National Defence University (PAK); Royal College of Defence Studies (UK)

Military service
- Allegiance: Pakistan
- Branch/service: Pakistan Air Force
- Years of service: 1986 – present
- Rank: Air Chief Marshal
- Commands: DCAS (Administration); DCAS (Air Defence); ACAS (Training Officers); ACAS (Ops Req & Develop); DG Projects; DG Air Force Strategic Command; Additional Secretary (II), Ministry of Defence; PAF Base Minhas; 15th Squadron (Cobras)
- Battles/wars: 2022 Pakistani airstrikes in Afghanistan; 2024 Iran–Pakistan border skirmishes; Afghanistan–Pakistan clashes (2024–present); 2024 Pakistani airstrikes in Afghanistan; 2025 India-Pakistan standoff; 2026 Afghanistan–Pakistan war
- Awards: See list

Air Chief Marshal Zaheer Ahmad Babar Sidhu (Note: Punjabi, Urdu: ظہیر احمد بابر سدھو) NI(M) HJ HI(M) SI(M) TI(M) (born 16 April 1965) is a Pakistani military officer who has served as the Chief of Air Staff of the Pakistan Air Force since 2021. In service since 1986, Babar took over command of the Pakistan Air Force from his predecessor ACM Mujahid Anwar Khan.

Zaheer was granted a one-year extension to his tenure on 17 March 2024, making him the second chief in Pakistan Air Force history to receive such an extension after Anwar Shamim, who received an extension during the military government of General Zia Ul Haq in 1981.

In November 2024, the Government of Pakistan revised the tenure of the service chiefs of the Pakistan Armed Forces from three to five years, which consequently extended Sidhu's term as Air Chief until March 2026.

On 5 December 2025, Sidhu's term as Air Chief was once again extended for the period of two years till March 2028.

Under Sidhu's command, Pakistan Air Forces has carried out five cross-border airstrikes against various terror groups involved in the activity against Pakistani state. This includes 2022 Pakistani airstrikes in Afghanistan, 2024 Pakistani airstrikes in Iran, March 2024 Pakistani airstrikes in Afghanistan and December 2024 Pakistani airstrikes in Afghanistan, 2025 PAF Airstrikes in Afghanistan. Under Air Chief's Sidhu's watch PAF drone and jets also seen action during 2025 Afghanistan-Pakistan conflict.

In October 2025 PAF carried out precision strikes on various Taliban military camps across Pakistan-Afghanistan border in the Afghan bordering provinces of Khost, Kunar, Paktika and Paktia while also striking deeper Taliban locations in Kabul and Kandahar who have been actively supporting terrorist groups against Pakistan. It was first time in the history of Afghanistan-Pakistan relations that Pakistani jets attacked Afghanistan's capital Kabul. The PAF's October 2025 airstrikes reportedly targeted chief of anti-Pakistan TTP who narrowly escaped PAF strikes.

== Early life and education ==
Babar Sidhu was born on 16 April 1965 into a Punjabi Jat family of the Sidhu clan.

His father Hakeem Ghulam Muhammad was a religious scholar and the family originally hails from the Sidh village in the Gujrat District of Punjab. His brother Chaudhary Naseer Ahmed Abbas was elected to the National Assembly of Pakistan from the Constituency NA-65 Gujrat-IV on the ticket of Pakistan Muslim League (N) in 2024 Pakistani general election.

For his higher studies has attended the Combat Commanders School, the Air War College and the Royal College of Defense Studies in the United Kingdom.

== Military career ==
Babar Sidhu was commissioned in GD (P) Branch of Pakistan Air Force in April 1986. During his career, he has commanded a Fighter Squadron, a Flying Wing, an Operational Air Base and Regional Air Command.

=== Staff appointments ===
In his staff appointments, he has served as Assistant Chief of the Air Staff (Operational Requirement & Development), Assistant Chief of the Air Staff (Training-Officers) and Additional Secretary at Ministry of Defence. He has also served as Director General Projects, Director General Air Force Strategic Command, Deputy Chief of Air Staff (Air Defence) and Deputy Chief of the Air Staff (Administration) at Air Headquarters Islamabad.

=== Awards and decorations ===
In recognition of his services, he has been awarded with Tamgha-i-lmtiaz (Military), Sitara-i-lmtiaz (Military), Hilal-i-lmtiaz (Military) and Nishan-i-lmtiaz (Military).

== Chief of the Air Staff ==
=== Appointment ===
Babar Sidhu was serving as Deputy Chief of the Air Staff (Administration) at the Air Headquarters in Islamabad before being appointed as Chief of Air Staff on 17 March 2021. He assumed charge on 19 March 2021, succeeding Air Chief Marshal Mujahid Anwar Khan.

=== JF-17 Thunder deal with Azerbaijani Air Forces ===
In February 2024, the Pakistan Air Force inked its largest export agreement in the nation's history with the Azerbaijan Air Force, entailing the sale of JF-17C Block-III fighter jets valued at $1.6 billion.

=== Tenure extension ===
On 17 March 2024, Prime Minister Shahbaz Sharif extended Babar Sidhu's tenure by one year, just a day before his scheduled retirement.

==== Reactions and criticism ====
Ayesha Siddiqa, in an article for The Friday Times, expressed concerns regarding the approval of a one-year extension for Sidhu. She highlighted potential implications on the Air Force's reputation for professionalism. Additionally, she noted speculations within certain circles regarding the influence of Chaudhary Naseer Ahmed Abbas, Sidhu's brother's affiliation with the Pakistan Muslim League-Nawaz (PML-N) in securing the extension.

== Controversies ==
=== Aircraft flown ===
Controversially, the Indian media has asserted that he had not piloted F-16s but only Mirage III and V aircraft.

=== Corruption allegations ===
In November 2023, Pakistani journalist Wajahat Saeed Khan reported that a detailed white paper had surfaced, purportedly written by a Pakistan Air Force insider following the Mianwali air base attack on 4 November 2023. The document alleges large-scale corruption, nepotism, and kickbacks by the air chief, Babar Sidhu. The allegations involve housing land deals in Islamabad, the procurement of new aircraft, deliberate delays in refurbishing the Falcon F-16 program, and attempts to merge the JF-17 production unit at the Kamra air base into a proposed new "Technology Park" in Kharian.

According to a petition filed in the Islamabad High Court (IHC) in March 2025 by Advocate Inamur Rahim on behalf of Shazia Javad, the wife of retired Air Marshal Jawad Saeed, Saeed was abducted from his residence in January 2024 and subsequently held in illegal custody by PAF authorities without due process of law. A PAF spokesperson claimed that Saeed had been sharing sensitive information with his brother, who resides in the United States. However, Shazia Javad told the BBC that the court martial proceedings were initiated in retaliation for a white paper authored by her husband which detailed Sidhu's overreach of authority and corruption, and said "this is retaliation for daring to question the air chief's excesses".

In April 2025, a PAF tribunal sentenced Javad Saeed to 14 years' imprisonment, a term later reduced to four years by Sidhu. The IHC was also informed that Saeed had been detained at an officers' mess.

== Awards and decorations ==
Babar has been awarded the Nishan-i-Imtiaz (Military), Hilal-i-Imtiaz (Military), Sitara-i-Imtiaz (Military) and the Tamgha-i-Imtiaz (Military). He was further awarded the Hilal-i-Jur'at following his contributions in the 2025 India–Pakistan conflict.

=== Foreign decorations ===
Foreign Award
Turkey	Turkish Legion of Merit
Kingdom of Saudi Arabia	Order of King Abdulaziz
Bahrain	The Order of Bahrain, 1st Class

== Effective dates of promotion ==
Insignia	Rank	Date
	Air Chief Marshal	March 2021 (CAS)
	Air Marshal	July 2018
	Air Vice Marshal	July 2015
	Air Commodore	September 2012
	Group Captain	March 2007
	Wing Commander	August 2001
	Squadron Leader	September 1993
	Flight Lieutenant	March 1990
	Flying Officer	April 1988
	Pilot Officer	April 1986
