= Mian Tariq Mahmood =

Pakistani politician

Member of the Provincial Assembly of the Punjab
- Incumbent
- Assumed office 1988
- In office 1997–1999
- Constituency: PP-113 (Gujrat-VI)
- In office 2008–2013
- In office 2013–2018

Personal details
- Born: 5 May 1955 (age 71) Dinga
- Party: Pakistan Muslim League (N)

Punjab Assembly Lahore

Mian Tariq Mahmood is a Pakistani politician who was a Member of the Provincial Assembly of the Punjab, between 1988 and May 2018.

== Early life and education ==
He was born on 5 May 1955 in Dinga.

He graduated from the University of the Punjab in 2003.

== Political career ==
He started his political career from succeeding in election of Punjab local government in 1985. Served as a chairman of Dinga City Town committee. He was elected to the Provincial Assembly of the Punjab as a candidate of Islami Jamhoori Ittehad (IJI) from Constituency PP-97 (Gujrat-VII) in the 1988 Pakistani general election. He received 33,713 votes and defeated a candidate of Pakistan Peoples Party (PPP). During his tenure as Member of the Punjab Assembly, he served as Parliamentary Secretary for Social Welfare and Zakat.

He was re-elected to the Provincial Assembly of the Punjab as a candidate of IJI from Constituency PP-97 (Gujrat-VII) in the 1990 Pakistani general election. He received 41,851 votes and defeated a candidate of Pakistan Democratic Alliance (PDA). During his tenure as Member of the Punjab Assembly, he served as Parliamentary Secretary for Social Welfare and Zakat.

He ran for the seat of the Provincial Assembly of the Punjab as an independent candidate from Constituency PP-97 (Gujrat-VII) in the 1993 Pakistani general election but was unsuccessful. He received 21,803 votes and lost the seat to Mian Muhammad Afzal Hayat.

He was re-elected to the Provincial Assembly of the Punjab as a candidate of Pakistan Muslim League (N) (PML-N) from Constituency PP-97 (Gujrat-VII) in the 1997 Pakistani general election. He received 35,219 votes and defeated an independent candidate.

He was re-elected to the Provincial Assembly of the Punjab as a candidate of Pakistan Muslim League (Q) from Constituency PP-113 (Gujrat-VI) in the 2008 Pakistani general election. He received 34924 votes and defeated Chaudhry Jaffar Iqbal.

He was re-elected to the Provincial Assembly of the Punjab as a candidate of PML-N from Constituency PP-113 (Gujrat-VI) in the 2013 Pakistani general election.
