= Snecma M88 =

French afterburning turbofan engine

M88
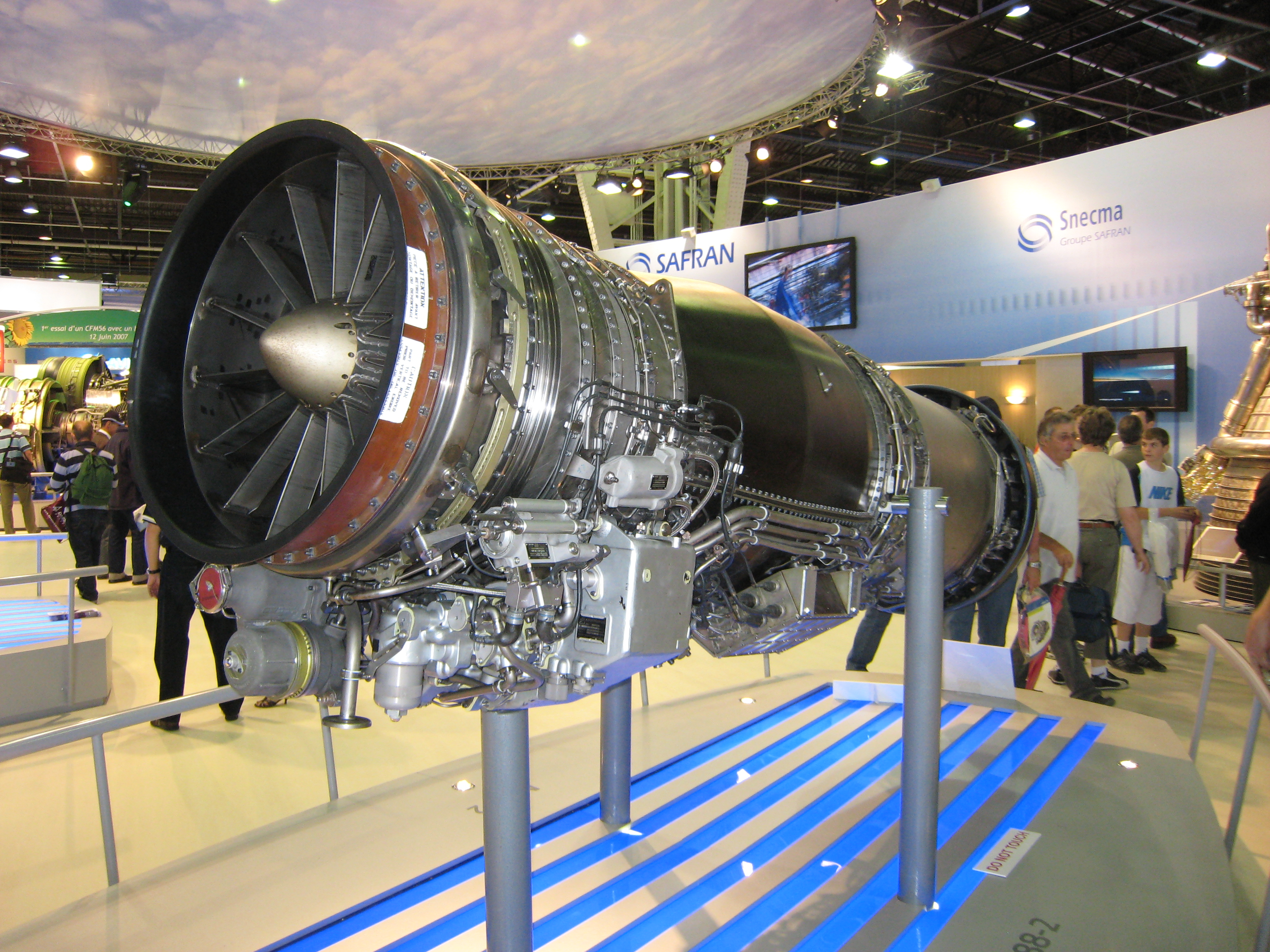
- M88-2 engine at Paris Air Show 2007
- Type: Turbofan
- National origin: France
- Manufacturer: Safran Aircraft Engines
- Major applications: Dassault Rafale

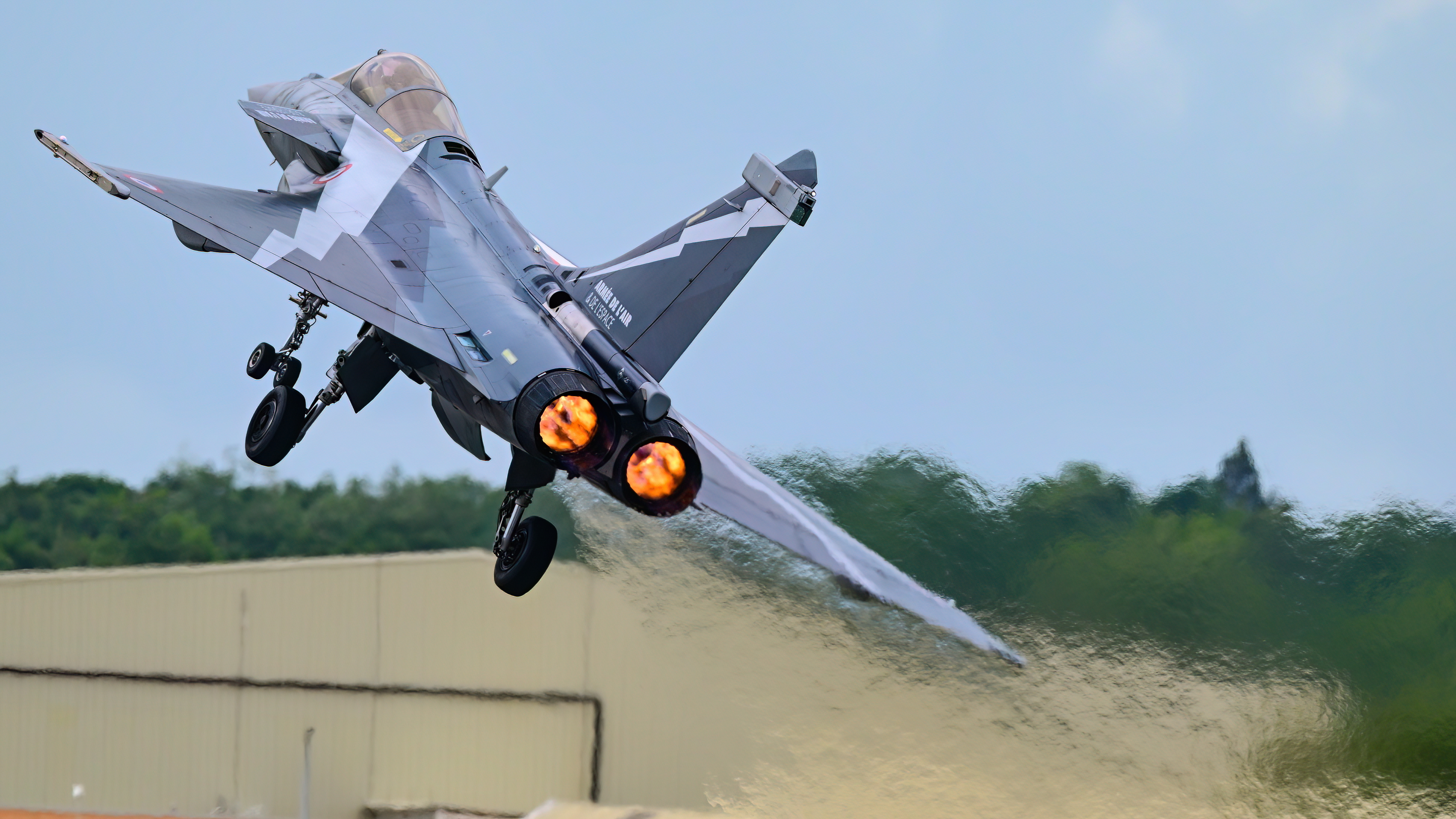
The M88 is the principal engine powering the Dassault Rafale.

The Snecma M88 is a French afterburning turbofan engine developed by Snecma (now known as Safran Aircraft Engines) for the Dassault Rafale fighter.

== History ==
The program for the M88 arose from a need for a suitable propulsion system for air-superiority and ground-attack missions. In 1983, Dassault Aviation planned to produce a technology demonstrator for the Avion de Combat eXpérimental (ACX), which was expected to fly in 1986. Although the M88 was intended to be fitted to the definitive aircraft, it was not expected to be ready in time, and the ACX was therefore initially powered by the General Electric F404.

Due to the broad application of the new engine (as the aircraft was to replace a considerable number of the French fleet), it was necessary for the engine to have a high thrust-to-weight ratio, low fuel consumption in all flight regimes, and a long engine life. Additional considerations were afforded to good maintainability, and upgrade potential (73 kN to 105 kN using the same core). The program was officially launched in 1986. It was decided to flight test the engine, the M88-2, aboard the Dassault Breguet, and the Rafale A prototype. Indeed, after having replaced the aircraft's left F404, the engine was first flight tested aboard the Rafale A on 27 February 1990. By then, the fourteen M88-2s had accumulated 1,600 hours of running time. The demonstrator thereafter reached supersonic speed without afterburners, reached a height of 50,000 ft, endured load factors of −2g and +9g and flown at an angle of attack of 30°. As of July 2022, the M88 engine that powers Dassault Aviation’s multirole fighter has clocked up more than one million operating hours.

In early 2026, it was reported that Safran was willing to set up an additional engine production line in India, subject to the Indian acquisition of 140 Rafales for the Indian Air force and Navy. An MRO facility is also being established for M88 engines in India under the 26-jet Rafale M contract for the Indian Navy.

== Design and development ==
The SNECMA M88 engine main concepts and choices were settled at the end of the 1970s, both SNECMA and French Ministry of Defense concluded that a high overall pressure ratio and high Turbine Entry Temperature (TET) were needed. The layout was to be a twin spool, low bypass turbofan engine using new powder metal compressor blisks, a clean burning annular combustor and a key new technology, air cooled, ceramic coated, single crystal turbine blades made from a new AM1 alloy (N-18 alloy in the final production engines). The turbine performance was further enhanced with the use of active blade tip clearance control. Full authority digital engine controls and monitoring were used throughout. Air cooling of the turbine blades was essential, as they were to operate in a gas stream 300 K above the materials melting temperature. Component bench testing of the turbine sections began in 1978 seeking a TET of 1700K. After initially promising results, this goal was raised to 1850K. By 1987 this goal was reached and the first demonstrator engine, the M88-1, was presented for development.

In 1989, the engine M88-2 (Final production version) reached its designed maximum thrust of 75KN 5 months ahead of the contract deadline. By this time the first engine had been fitted to test airframe ACX-RAFALE. Engine life was certified up to 500 hours at this time.

The engine obtained flight qualification in 1995 after 5500hrs on the test bench at both sea level and simulated altitude conditions and included simulated Mach 1.6 airflows, as well as an additional 4000hrs over 600 flights on the prototype aircraft in real world conditions.

The first serial production M88-2 engine was delivered in 1996. The engine design was focused on keeping weight and area to a minimum. Compared to the previous generation of 9K-50 Atar engines the M88 was 40% shorter and 45% lighter while improving thrust to weight ratio by 80%. The engine is fitted with a digital condition monitoring and prognostic system in order to reduce engine downtime and increase the time between overhauls. Known as the Engine Condition Monitoring System, it functions by collecting data from the engine monitoring sensors, vibrations, inversion and oil filter clogging sensors. The system is able to extend or shorten the engine's TBO depending on the usage of that particular engine.

The engine has to date clocked up over 1 million flight hours with over 600 units delivered. The M88-2 engine has seen regular development and improvement. Early Stage 1 engines were limited to a 300 hours time between overhauls "TBO". Stage 4 engines (Delivered from 2011 and onwards, designation M88-2E4) have TBOs exceeding 1000hrs and a reduced fuel consumption of 3%.

== Variants ==
=== In production ===
M88-1
A four-year proof-of-concept program that preceded the M88-2.
M88-2
A 73 kN (7,400 kgf; 16,000 lbf) thrust variant powering the Dassault Rafale.

=== Proposed ===
M88-TREX

The M88-TREX is an upgrade to the existing M88 engine that raises thrust. Unveiled at the Paris air show in 2025. The 20% improvement in thrust from 73.4 kN to 88.2 kN is to be provided by an improved low-pressure compressor that will allow greater airflow and a new high-pressure turbine with new materials and next-generation cooling circuits. The engine nozzle will benefit from optimized aerodynamics further adding to the performance. The TREX variant is planned to enter service on the F5 variant of the Rafale.

M88-3
An 80–93 kN (8,200–9,500 kgf; 18,000–21,000 lbf) thrust variant for single-engine light combat aircraft. Proposed for an improved JAS-39 Gripen C military aircraft. The M88-3 would have a new low pressure compressor (LPC) with a new variable stator vane stage and an increased mass flow of 73.4 kg/s (162 lb/s).

M88-4
A 95–105 kN (9,700–10,700 kgf; 21,000–24,000 lbf) thrust variant for heavier single-engine fighter aircraft.. Safran has offered joint development of these engine to India replacing the F414-INS6 engine in Tejas Mk2 with comprehensive tech transfer to India. A scaled up variant of these engine is also been talked upon which is likely to produce 110-120kN which might be used for AMCA Mk2.

M88 Pack CGP (for "total cost of ownership") or M88-4E
Based on a study contract, with development and production reported in 2008 by the General Delegation for Armament to introduce technical improvements and reduce maintenance costs. The purpose of this release is to reduce cost of ownership of the M88 and longer inspection intervals of the main modules by increasing the lifetime of the hot and rotating parts. It has been tested in flight for the first time March 22, 2010 at Istres, the Rafale's M02 CEV.

M123
A proposed commercial derivative targeted for regional jets, initially with 73 kN (7,400 kgf; 16,000 lbf) thrust but eventually spanning a thrust range of 63–100 kN (6,400–10,200 kgf; 14,000–22,000 lbf). Studied with General Electric Aviation to possibly replace the jointly produced CFM56 engine, the M123 added a seventh high pressure compressor (HPC) stage to the M88's six-stage HPC unit. Later known as the CFM88, the engine was a proposed powerplant for the Regioliner, the DASA/Aerospatiale/Alenia successor to the MPC 75.

M138
A turboprop variant with a core based on the M88-2 engine, intended to power the Airbus A400M transport aircraft.

== Applications ==
- Dassault Rafale

== Specifications (M88-2) ==
Data from Safran Aircraft Engines

==== General characteristics ====
- Type: Afterburning turbofan
- Length: 353.8 cm (139.3 in)
- Diameter: 69.6 cm (27.4 in)
- Dry weight: 897 kg (1,978 lb)

==== Components ====
- Compressor: Axial, 3-stage LP, 6-stage HP
- Combustors: Annular
- Turbine: 1-stage LP, 1-stage HP

==== Performance ====
- Maximum thrust: 50 kN (11,200 lbf) and 75 kN (16,900 lbf) (with afterburner)
- Overall pressure ratio: 24.5:1
- Bypass ratio: 0.3:1
- Air mass flow: 65 kg/s (143 lb/s)
- Turbine inlet temperature: 1,850 K (1,577 °C; 2,870 °F)
- Fuel consumption: 3,977 kg/h (8,770 lb/h) and 12,695 kg/h (27,990 lb/h) (with afterburner)
- Specific fuel consumption: 22.14 g/(kN⋅s) (0.782 lb/(lbf⋅h)) and 47.11 g/(kN⋅s) (1.663 lb/(lbf⋅h)) (with afterburner)
- Thrust-to-weight ratio: 5.68:1 (dry) and 8.52:1 (with afterburner)

== See also ==
Comparable engines

- Eurojet EJ200
- General Electric F404
- GTRE GTX-35VS Kaveri
- Klimov RD-33
- Guizhou WS-13
- Guizhou WS-19

Related lists

- List of aircraft engines

== Bibliography ==
- Williams, Mel, ed. (2002). "Dassault Rafale". Superfighters, The Next Generation of Combat Aircraft. London: AIRtime Publishing. ISBN 978-1-880588-53-6.
