= NA-65 Gujrat-IV =

Constituency of the National Assembly of Pakistan

- Constituency for the National Assembly of Pakistan
- Region: Kharian Tehsil including Dinga, Kharian and Lalamusa city Kunjah Tehsil (partly) of Gujrat District
- Electorate: 586,253

Current constituency
- Party: Pakistan Muslim League (N)
- Member: Chaudhary Naseer Ahmed Abbas
- Created from: NA-106 Gujrat-III

NA-65 Gujrat-IV (این اے-65، گجرات-4) is a constituency for the National Assembly of Pakistan. It includes Lalamusa, Akhtar Karnana and Dinga city.

== Members of Parliament ==
=== 2018–2023: NA-70 Gujrat-III ===
Election	Member	Party
2018	Syed Faizul Hassan Shah	PTI

=== 2024–present: NA-65 Gujrat-IV ===
Election	Member	Party
2024	Chaudhary Naseer Ahmed Abbas	PML(N)

== Election 2002 ==
General elections were held on 10 October 2002. Qamar Zaman Kaira of PPP won by 83,438 votes.

General election 2002: NA-106 Gujrat-III
Party	Candidate	Votes	%	±%
PPP	Qamar Zaman Kaira	83,438	51.99	
NA	Mian Muhammad Afzal Hayat	69,826	43.51	
PAT	Ch. Muhammad Asghar Deona	6,357	3.96	
Independent	Ch. Jamshaid Nasar	861	0.54	
Turnout		165,680	51.82	
Total valid votes		160,482	96.86	
Rejected ballots		5,198	3.14	
Majority		13,612	8.48	
Registered electors		319,747		

== Election 2008 ==
General elections were held on 18 February 2008. Qamar Zaman Kaira of PPP won by 89,555 votes.

General election 2008: NA-106 Gujrat-III
Party	Candidate	Votes	%	±%
PPP	Qamar Zaman Kaira	89,555	51.94	
PML(Q)	Noor Ul Hassan Shah	71,016	41.19	
PML(N)	Mian Muhammad Akram	10,506	6.09	
Others	Others (three candidates)	1,352	0.78	
Turnout		178,885	55.50	
Total valid votes		172,429	96.39	
Rejected ballots		6,456	3.61	
Majority		18,539	10.75	
Registered electors		322,310		
PPP hold				

== Election 2013 ==
General elections were held on 11 May 2013. Chaudhry Jaffar Iqbal of PML-N won by 83,024 votes and became the member of National Assembly.

General election 2013: NA-106 Gujrat-III
Party	Candidate	Votes	%	±%
PML(N)	Chaudhry Jaffar Iqbal	83,024	38.83	
Independent	Noor Ul Hassan Shah	55,987	26.19	
PPP	Qamar Zaman Kaira	34,775	16.26	
PTI	Mian Muhammad Afzal Hayat	31,422	14.70	
Others	Others (fourteen candidates)	8,609	4.02	
Turnout		220,710	53.37	
Total valid votes		213,817	96.88	
Rejected ballots		6,893	3.12	
Majority		27,037	12.64	
Registered electors		413,565		
PML(N) gain from PPP				

== Election 2018 ==
General elections were held on 25 July 2018.

General election 2018: NA-70 Gujrat-III
Party	Candidate	Votes	%	±%
PTI	Syed Faizul Hassan Shah	95,168	38.67	
PML(N)	Chaudhry Jaffar Iqbal	67,233	27.32	
PPP	Qamar Zaman Kaira	42,508	17.27	
TLP	Adnan Asim	21,276	8.65	
Others	Others (five candidates)	9,340	3.80	
Turnout		246,084	49.74	
Rejected ballots		10,559	4.29	
Majority		27,935	11.35	
Registered electors		494,780		
PTI gain from PML(N)				

== Election 2024 ==
General elections were held on 8 February 2024. Chaudhary Naseer Ahmed Abbas won the election with 90,772 votes.

General election 2024: NA-65 Gujrat-IV
Party	Candidate	Votes	%	±%
PML(N)	Chaudhary Naseer Ahmed Abbas	90,772	32.60	▲5.28
PTI	Syed Wajahat Hussnain Shah (Note: Filed nomination papers as PTI candidate but ECP allowed him to run as an Independent)	82,351	29.58	▼9.09
PPP	Qamar Zaman Kaira	51,158	18.37	▲1.10
Independent	Haseeb Muhammad Khan	22,136	7.95	N/A
TLP	Mudassar Ali	20,389	7.32	▼1.33
Others	Others (fifteen candidates)	11,640	4.18	
Turnout		287,497	49.04	▼0.70
Total valid votes		278,446	96.85	
Rejected ballots		9,051	3.15	
Majority		8,421	3.02	
Registered electors		586,253		
PML(N) gain from PTI				

== See also ==
- NA-64 Gujrat-III
- NA-66 Wazirabad
