= Tanveer Ashraf Kaira =

Tanvir Ashraf Kaira

Finance Minister of Punjab
- In office April 22, 2008 – March 1, 2011

Personal details
- Born: August 25, 1960 (age 66) Gujrat, Pakistan
- Party: Pakistan Peoples Party
- Relations: Qamar Zaman Kaira (cousin)
- Education: Burn Hall, Abbottabad; F.G. College No.1 Islamabad; Sussex University, UK
- Occupation: Businessperson

Tanveer Ashraf Kaira (born August 25, 1960), is a Pakistani politician. He is the former Finance minister of Punjab, Pakistan. He was elected as a Member Provincial Assembly of the Punjab in General Elections 2002. He won again in 2008 as MPA and became the finance minister of Punjab after 2008 to 2011.

== Education ==
Tanvir Ashraf Kaira graduated from F.G. College No. 1, Islamabad in 1981 and obtained the degree of MBA in 1984 from Sussex University, UK.

== Political career ==
Kaira has been elected as Member Provincial Assembly of the Punjab in General Elections 2002 and 2008, while he became the Finance minister of Punjab after 2008 elections. He is the cousin of Qamar Zaman Kaira, who was the former Pakistani Federal Minister for Information & Broadcasting and member of National Assembly from 2002-2007 and 2008-2013.

His uncle, Chaudhry Muhammad Aslam Kaira, was a member of Punjab Assembly from 1988-1990, 1990-1993 and 1993-1996. His another uncle, Haji Muhammad Asghar Kaira, was the member of Punjab Assembly from 1985-1988 and member of National Assembly from 1988-1990 and 1993-1996.

== PPP + PMLN Punjab Govt Coalition 2008-2011 ==
On March 1, 2011 Tanveer Ashraf Kaira along with six ministers of PPPP that includes, Raja Riaz, Ashraf Sohna, Haji Ishaq, Dr Tanvirul Islam, Farooq Yousaf Ghurki and Neelam Jabbar were expelled from the Cabinet ministry of Mian Shahbaz Sharif, consequently Tanveer Ashraf Kaira is no longer able to prolong his ministry of finance with effect from March 1, 2011. On February 26, 2011 the Punjab chief minister had notified the sacking of 13 parliamentary secretaries by using his administrative powers.
