= Sidh, Gujrat =

Pakistani village

Sidh is a village in Kharian Tehsil, Gujrat District, Punjab, Pakistan. It is situated about 15 kilometres (9.3 mi) from Kharian and 35 kilometres (22 mi) from Gujrat. The neighboring villages include Kohli, Jakharr, Bhaati, and Udha. In terms of electoral constituencies, Sidh falls under Union Council 102, Punjab Assembly constituency PP-33 (Gujrat-VII), and National Assembly constituency NA-65 (Gujrat-IV).

== Demographics ==
The majority of inhabitants of village are Sidhu Jats; the name of the village is derived from their caste. Sidhu's are converts from Hinduism and Sikhism and Hindu and Sikh Sidhu's are a martial race and they come from elite clan of warriors and were sought after soldiers in the history of sub-continent and subsequently during the British raj owing to their bravery and being expert in the skill of warfare. Total of 500 homes are situated in Sidh, of which more than 400 are Jats. Katy's tends to use surname Chaudhary. Others castes are Bhatti, Baig, Tarkhan, Darzi, Lohar & Syed.

== Economy ==
Sidh hosts five mosques, a post office, an animal hospital, shops, a mill and many schools. The land surrounding the village is arid, production of crops is totally dependent on seasonal rainfall. As a result, agriculture has not been the main source of income for the local population. Many of the villagers have gone overseas to find work.

== Sports ==
Sidh is also a very popular village amongst all the villages of Gujrat for its sports. Basic sports played in Sidh are Cricket, Football, Volleyball, Badminton and Kabaddi. Sidhu fighters Cricket Club is currently the most successful team of the village. It has recently won about 15 tournament in a very short time period of 16 months and they have not stopped yet. Sidh has produced many great players of the region in many sports.
