= Chaudhary Naseer Ahmed Abbas =

Pakistani politician

- چوہدری نصیر احمد عباس

Member of the National Assembly of Pakistan
- Incumbent
- Assumed office 29 February 2024
- Constituency: NA-65 Gujrat-IV

Personal details
- Party: PMLN (2024-present)
- Relatives: Zaheer Ahmad Babar (brother)

Chaudhary Naseer Ahmed Abbas (Urdu: چوہدری نصیر احمد عباس) is a Pakistani politician who has been a member of the National Assembly of Pakistan since February 2024.

He is the brother of Zaheer Ahmad Babar, 16th Chief of Air Staff.

== Political career ==
Abbas was elected to the National Assembly of Pakistan as a candidate of Pakistan Muslim League (N) from Constituency NA-65 Gujrat-IV for the first time in the 2024 Pakistani general election.

According to an analysis, Abbas won with 90,982 votes, defeating Independent politician Supported (PTI) Pakistan Tehreek-e-Insaf, candidate Wajahat Hasnain Shah who received 82,411 votes. The winning margin stood at 8,571 votes, while the number of rejected votes totaled 9,092.
