= Guizhou WS-13 =

Chinese turbofan aircraft engine

WS-13
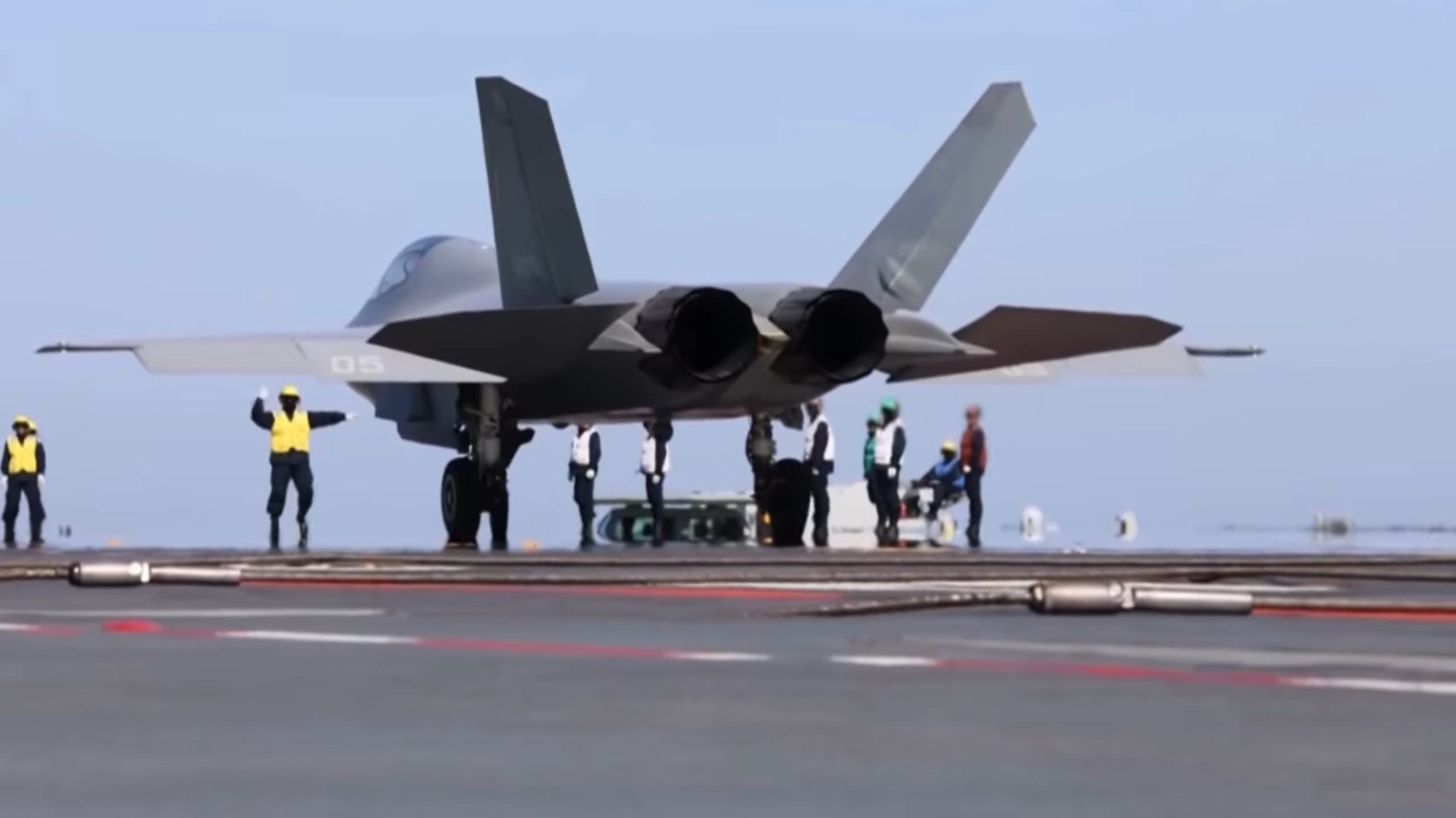
- WS-21/WS-13X engines on the Shenyang J-35
- Type: Turbofan
- National origin: China
- Manufacturer: Guizhou Aircraft Industry Corporation
- First run: 2006
- Major applications: CAC/PAC JF-17 Thunder; Shenyang J-35

The WS-13 (Chinese: 涡扇-13), codenamed Taishan, is an afterburning turbofan engine designed and manufactured by Guizhou Aircraft Industry Corporation. It was originally developed to power the CAC/PAC JF-17 Thunder, a lightweight multirole fighter jointly developed by China and Pakistan. Improved variants of the WS-13 have also been developed to power the Shenyang J-35 fifth-generation stealth fighter, while the latest versions are intended to equip advanced variants of the JF-17 Thunder, including the Block III (often described as a 4.5-generation fighter).

== Design and development ==
China began development of the Taishan in 2000 to create a domestic engine for replacing the Klimov RD-93 turbofan, which had been selected in the 1990s to power the JF-17 lightweight fighter. It is designed to produce 86 kN (19,000 lb) of thrust with afterburner and have a life span of 2,200 hours; an improved version providing up to 93 kN (21,000 lb) of thrust with afterburner was also developed.

The WS-13 Taishan was certified in 2007 and serial production began in 2009. The 18 March 2010 edition of the HKB Report stated that a JF-17 equipped with the WS-13 completed its first successful runway taxi test.

Officials at the Farnborough International Airshow in August 2010 stated that a JF-17 was being test flown with a Chinese engine, likely the WS-13. In November 2012, Aviation Week & Space Technology reported that flight testing on the JF-17 was underway in China. It was reported at the 2015 Paris Air Show that testing was continuing.

Guizhou is developing a new engine, designated the WS-19 that fits in the same footprint as the WS-13 but is a wholly new design that incorporates the same technology as the Xian WS-15. The WS-19 is the intended engine for versions of the Shenyang J-35 medium-size stealth fighter such as the J-35 for aircraft carriers.

== Variants ==
- WS-13 – Base production variant producing 86 kN (19,330 lbf) of thrust with afterburner.
- WS-13A – High-bypass turbofan derivative designed for increased fuel efficiency in transport and commercial applications.
- WS-13E (IPE) – Improved Performance Engine (IPE) upgrade, increasing afterburning thrust to 92.16 kN (20,720 lb_{f}).
- WS-21 (WS-13X) – Further evolution of the WS-13E featuring full-authority digital engine control (FADEC) and thrust vectoring, producing 93.2 kN (21,000 lb_{f}). Primary power plant for the FC-31 / J-35 program.

== Applications ==
- CAC/PAC JF-17 Thunder (WS-13)
- Shenyang J-35 (WS-13EX)

== Specifications (WS-13) ==
Data from China Times

==== General characteristics ====
- Type: afterburning turbofan
- Length: 4.14 m (163 in)
- Diameter: 1.02 m (40 in)
- Dry weight: 1,135 kg (2,502 lb)

==== Components ====
- Compressor: axial, 4-stage low pressure, 8-stage high pressure compressor
- Combustors: annular
- Turbine: counter-rotating 1-stage high pressure, 1-stage low pressure

==== Performance ====
- Maximum thrust: 56.75 kilonewtons (12,760 lb_{f}) dry; 86.37 kilonewtons (19,420 lb_{f}) with afterburner
- Bypass ratio: 0.57:1
- Turbine inlet temperature: 1650 K (1,377 °C (2,511 °F))
- Thrust-to-weight ratio: 7.8
- Lifespan: >3000 hours

== See also ==
- Shenyang WS-10

Comparable engines

- Turbo-Union RB199
- Snecma M88 (M88-2 Standard)
- Klimov RD-93
- General Electric F404 (F404-GE-402 Standard)

Related lists

- List of aircraft engines
- List of Chinese aircraft engines
