= Shama Khalid =

Pakistani politician

- شمع خالد

2nd Governor of Gilgit Baltistan
- In office 23 March 2010 – 16 September 2010
- Preceded by: Qamar Zaman Kaira
- Succeeded by: Wazir Baig

Personal details
- Born: Astore, Pakistan
- Died: 16 September 2010
- Resting place: Astore
- Party: Pakistan Peoples Party (PPP)
- Education: MBBS (medical doctor degree in Pakistan)
- Alma mater: Khyber Medical University
- Profession: Doctor, politician

Shama Khalid was a Pakistani politician from Gilgit-Baltistan who served as the second Governor of Gilgit-Baltistan.

== Career ==
Shama Khalid belonged to Astore Valley, Gilgit-Baltistan and her father Wazir Ashraf Khan was a law graduate from the famous Aligarh University. She excelled in education and completed her MBBS from Peshawar in 1968. It is said that she was the first woman from Gilgit-Baltistan region to become a medical doctor.

After her marriage, Shama settled in Abbottabad where she started her medical practice. She worked in the population ministry for 20 years. During that period, she carried out social work in her area and regularly visited Gilgit-Baltistan to organize medical camps there. She also worked for social organizations, including "Save the Children".

== Death ==
On 16 September 2010, she died of cancer at age 60.
