= Guizhou WS-19 =

Afterburner turbofan engine

WS-19
- WS-19
- Type: Turbofan
- National origin: China
- Manufacturer: AECC
- Major applications: Shenyang J-35

The Guizhou WS-19 (Chinese: 涡扇-19), code name Huangshan, is an afterburner turbofan engine designed by the Guizhou Aeroengine Design Institute. It has a reported thrust-to-weight ratio of 10 and a thrust of 10 metric tons or 22,000 lbs.

The WS-19 fits in the same footprint as the earlier Guizhou WS-13, but is of an entirely new design that incorporates the same technology as found on the Xian WS-15. The WS-19 powers the production versions of the Shenyang FC-31 medium-size stealth fighter, known as the Shenyang J-35.

== Design ==
The reported maximum thrust of the WS-19 is 116 kN (26,000 lb_{f}).

== Specifications (WS-19) ==
Data from China Aerospace Propulsion Technology Forum 2022

==== General characteristics ====
- Type: afterburning turbofan
- Length:
- Diameter:
- Dry weight:

==== Components ====
- Compressor: axial
- Combustors: annular

==== Performance ====
- Maximum thrust: 22,000–26,000 lbf (98–116 kN; 9,979–11,793 kgf) with afterburner
- Thrust-to-weight ratio: ~10

== See also ==
- Xian WS-15

Comparable engines

- General Electric F414
- Eurojet EJ200
- Snecma M88-3

Related lists

- List of aircraft engines
