= Jawad Saeed =

Pakistani military person

Jawad Saeed SI TI (M)
- Military career
- Allegiance: PAK
- Branch: Pakistan Air Force
- Service years: 1986–2021
- Rank: Air Marshal
- Commands: PAF Base Kamra
- Awards: Sitara-e-Imtiaz; Tamgha-e-Imtiaz

Jawad Saeed is a retired Pakistan Air Force three-star rank officer who attained the rank of air marshal. Commissioned in 1986, he held several high-level commands, including the Northern Air Command, before retiring in 2021. In 2024, Saeed was arrested and subjected to a court-martial for allegedly leaking sensitive military information to his brother in the United States, resulting in a 14-year prison sentence under the Official Secrets Act, 1923. Though his family maintained the court-martial was in retaliation for a white paper published by Saeed which exposed the corruption of Air Chief Marshal Zaheer Ahmad Babar Sidhu.

Saeed's conviction drew legal challenges from his family, who petitioned the Islamabad High Court and Lahore High Court for details of the proceedings, citing procedural irregularities.

== Career ==
Saeed was commissioned in the General Duties (Pilot) branch of the Pakistan Air Force on 1 November 1986. During his early service, he commanded a fighter squadron and later a fighter wing. Saeed also served as an operational air base commander and held staff appointments, including director of operations and personal staff officer to the then Chief of the Air Staff.

He is a graduate of the Combat Commanders' School, PAF Air War College, and the Royal College of Defence Studies in the United Kingdom.

=== Senior commands ===
Saeed was promoted to air vice-marshal and commanded an operational air base as well as a regional air command. In 2018, he was elevated to the rank of air marshal alongside Air Marshals Syed Noman Ali and Zaheer Ahmad Babar. Following his promotion, Saeed assumed command of the Northern Air Command.

He later served as Deputy Chief of Air Staff (Administration) in 2020–2021, positioning him as a potential successor to Air Chief Marshal Mujahid Anwar Khan in 2021. Saeed retired upon reaching the age of superannuation on 18 March 2021.

== Court-martial and conviction ==
On 21 January 2024, Saeed was arrested at his residence in Islamabad on charges of leaking sensitive information. The Pakistan Air Force initiated a Field General Court Martial under the Pakistan Air Force Act, 1953, charging him with sedition, espionage, and violations of the Official Secrets Act, 1923.

The charges centred on allegations that Saeed shared classified details, including fighter jet deployments at Mianwali Airbase, with his brother residing in the United States. A PAF spokesperson described the information as "extremely sensitive" and confirmed the sharing occurred post-retirement.

The trial concluded swiftly, with the charge sheet served on 21 February 2024 and proceedings completed within two days. On 29 April 2024, a military court sentenced Saeed to 14 years' imprisonment. He was detained in a PAF officers' mess designated as a "sub-jail" due to the case's sensitivity, rather than a civilian prison.

Saeed's wife, Shazia Jawad, filed a habeas corpus petition in the Islamabad High Court in March 2024, alleging unlawful detention and seeking his recovery. The court dismissed the petition after PAF confirmed his custody but allowed a separate challenge to the court-martial. Shazia later approached the Lahore High Court, claiming procedural flaws, including denial of counsel of choice and lack of family notification. PAF refused to disclose records, citing national security under the Pakistan Air Force Act.

The family alleged the arrest stemmed from a white paper Saeed authored exposing corruption among senior PAF officials, including the Air Chief, rather than the information leak. PAF denied this, stating the court-martial was solely for the leak and unrelated to any administrative role in Operation Swift Retort in 2019. Following his conviction, Saeed's pension was discontinued, though family medical benefits were partially restored.

As of November 2025, Saeed remains in custody, with ongoing legal efforts by his family to access proceedings details.

== Awards ==
In 2018, in recognition of his service, Saeed was awarded the Sitara-e-Imtiaz (Military) and Tamgha-e-Imtiaz (Military).
