= Qamar Zaman Kaira =

Pakistani politician (born 1960)

- قمر زمان کائرہ
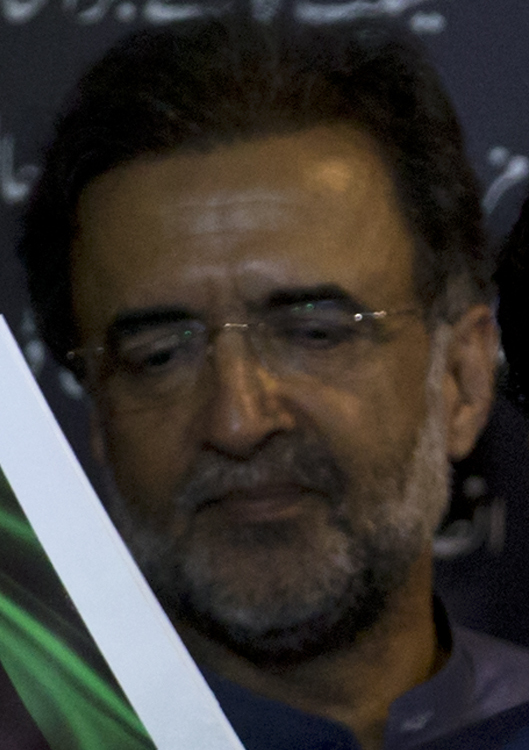
- Qamar Zaman Kaira in 2018

Advisor to the Prime Minister on Ministry of Kashmir Affairs and Gilgit-Baltistan
- In office 18 April 2022 – 10 August 2023
- President: Arif Alvi
- Prime Minister: Shehbaz Sharif
- Preceded by: Ali Amin Gandapur
- Succeeded by: Amir Muqam

Minister of Information and Broadcasting (Pakistan)
- In office 18 April 2012 – 16 March 2013
- President: Asif Ali Zardari
- Prime Minister: Raja Pervez Ashraf; Yusuf Raza Gillani
- Preceded by: Firdous Ashiq Awan
- Succeeded by: Pervaiz Rashid
- In office 14 March 2009 – 9 February 2011
- President: Asif Ali Zardari
- Prime Minister: Yusuf Raza Gillani
- Preceded by: Sherry Rehman
- Succeeded by: Firdous Ashiq Awan

Ministry of Kashmir Affairs and Gilgit-Baltistan
- In office 31 March 2008 – 9 February 2011
- President: Pervez Musharraf; Asif Ali Zardari
- Prime Minister: Yusuf Raza Gillani
- Preceded by: Abbas Sarfaraz Khan (caretaker)
- Succeeded by: Mian Manzoor Ahmad Wattoo

Governor of Gilgit–Baltistan (Acting)
- In office 16 September 2009 – 22 March 2010
- Succeeded by: Shama Khalid

Member of the National Assembly of Pakistan
- In office 13 March 2008 – 12 March 2013
- Constituency: NA-106 Gujrat-III
- In office 16 November 2002 – 15 November 2007
- Constituency: NA-106 Gujrat-III

Personal details
- Born: Qamar Zaman Kaira; 5 January 1958 (age 68) Lalamusa, Punjab, Pakistan
- Citizenship: Pakistan
- Party: PPP
- Relations: Tanveer Ashraf Kaira (cousin)
- Education: Forman Christian College, University of Punjab
- Occupation: Politician

Qamar Zaman Kaira (Urdu: قمر زمان کائرہ; born 5 January 1960) is a former Minister of Information and Broadcasting in the Government of Pakistan from 2008 to 2013. He also remained an advisor on Kashmir Affairs and Gilgit-Baltistan to Prime Minister Shehbaz Sharif from 18 April 2022 to 10 August 2023.

Before heading the Ministry of Information and Broadcasting, Kaira was the Minister for Kashmir Affairs and Northern Areas and later ascended as acting Governor of Gilgit–Baltistan in 2009.

His career in national politics started in 2002 from the platform of the Pakistan People's Party. After succeeding Sherry Rehman as Minister for Information and Broadcasting in 2009, he lost his ministry in 2011 to Firdous Ashiq Awan. However, in 2012, he was again reappointed in the same ministry after a cabinet reshuffle.

His son Osama Zaman Kaira died in a road accident on 17 May 2019 in Lalamusa in an attempt to save a motorcyclist, losing control of the car and crashing into a tree. He was buried on 18 May 2019 in Lalamusa.

== Early life and education ==
Kaira was born in Lalamusa City, Kharian Tehsil, Gujrat District in Punjab Province on 5 January 1960. He belongs to a political family. After attending a local high school, he matriculated and passed intermediate college testing examinations. After attending F.G. Degree College in Kharian Cantonment, he made college transfer to Forman Christian College, Lahore.

There, he enrolled in the Department of Philosophy and earned a BA in Philosophy in 1983. Kaira later applied to a graduate school at the University of Punjab to resume his higher education. In 1985, Kaira wrote his thesis for double master's degrees and subsequently obtained an MA in philosophy of politics and an MS in political science from the Punjab University.

== Political career ==
Kaira was elected to the National Assembly for the first time in 2002 and remained a member of the lower house of parliament until 2007. He returned to the National Assembly for a second consecutive term in 2008 and became a minister in the coalition government of the PPP, ANP, MQM and JUI-F formed after the 2008 elections.

He is a senior leader of the Pakistan People's Party, having won from his local constituency in Gujrat District in the 2002 and 2008 general elections. He was selected for the office of Federal Minister for Kashmir Affairs and Northern Areas on 31 March 2008, and was given the additional office of Federal Minister for Information on 14 March 2009. He remained Federal Minister until 2013.

After the resignation of the Imran Khan Government in 2022, Qamar Zaman Kaira was inducted into the cabinet of Prime Minister Shehbaz Sharif. He remained an advisor on Kashmir Affairs to former Prime Minister Shehbaz Sharif from 18 April 2022 to 10 August 2023.

== Writings and ideology ==
Kaira has written numerous articles related to political philosophy. In 2004, he penned piece for Dawn, "Romancing Trotsky" written in response to a debate in the Pakistani press concerning the interpretation of Trotskyism. The article addresses criticism of Leon Trotsky and defends the theory of permanent revolution. In the article, Kaira argues that Trotskyists supported anti-imperialist revolutions in countries such as China and Vietnam and maintains that these revolutions confirmed Trotsky's theoretical framework by bypassing a prolonged capitalist stage. He attributes what he describes as the later degeneration of these revolutions to Stalinist policies, particularly the doctrine of "socialism in one country." Kaira rejects claims that Trotsky dismissed the revolutionary role of the peasantry and emphasizes Trotsky's advocacy of a worker-led alliance with the peasantry. He also discusses the relationship between Lenin and Trotsky, arguing that their pre-1917 differences were resolved and that Lenin later endorsed key elements of Trotsky's ideas. The article criticizes Stalinism for major defeats of socialist movements in the twentieth century and portrays Trotsky as a consistent opponent of fascism and imperialism.
