= Chaudhry Jaffar Iqbal =

Pakistani politician (born 1972)

- چوہدری جعفر اقبال

Minister of State for Maritime Affairs
- In office 4 August 2017 – 31 May 2018
- President: Mamnoon Hussain
- Prime Minister: Shahid Khaqan Abbasi

Member of the National Assembly of Pakistan
- In office 1 June 2013 – 31 May 2018
- Constituency: NA-106 (Gujrat)

Personal details
- Born: 2 September 1972 (age 54)
- Party: Pakistan Muslim League (N)

Chaudhry Jaffar Iqbal (Urdu: چوہدری جعفر اقبال; born 2 September 1972) is a Pakistani politician who served as Minister of State for Maritime Affairs, in the Abbasi cabinet from August 2017 to May 2018. He had been a member of the National Assembly of Pakistan, from June 2013 to May 2018.

== Early life ==
He was born on 2 September 1972.

== Political career ==
He ran for the seat of the Provincial Assembly of Punjab as a candidate of Pakistan Muslim League (N) (PML-N) from Constituency PP-113 (Gujrat-VI) in the 2002 Pakistani general election, but was unsuccessful. He received 26,556 votes and lost the seat to a candidate off Pakistan Muslim League (Q) (PML-Q).

He ran for the seat of the Provincial Assembly of Punjab as a candidate of PML-N from Constituency PP-113 (Gujrat-VI) in the 2008 Pakistani general election, but was unsuccessful. He received 34,705 votes and lost the seat to Mian Tariq Mehmood.

He was elected to the National Assembly of Pakistan as a candidate of PML-N from Constituency NA-106 (Gujrat-III) in the 2013 Pakistani general election. He received 83,024 votes and defeated an independent candidate, Syed Noor Ul Hassan Shah. During his tenure as Member of the National Assembly, he served as the Federal Parliamentary Secretary for Defence.

Following the election of Shahid Khaqan Abbasi as Prime Minister of Pakistan in August 2017, he was inducted into the federal cabinet of Abbasi. He was appointed the Minister of State for Maritime Affairs. Upon the dissolution of the National Assembly on the expiration of its term on 31 May 2018, Iqbal ceased to hold the office as Minister of State for Maritime Affairs.
