= Chaudhry Hamid Hameed =

Pakistani politician

- چوہدری حامد حمید

Member of the National Assembly of Pakistan
- In office 13 August 2018 – 10 August 2023
- Constituency: NA-90 (Sargodha-III)
- In office 1 June 2013 – 31 May 2018
- Constituency: NA-66 (Sargodha-III)

Personal details
- Born: 2 March 1972 (age 54) Sargodha, Punjab, Pakistan
- Party: PMLN

Chaudhry Hamid Hameed (Urdu: چوہدری حامد حمید; born 2 March 1972) is a Pakistani politician who had been a member of the National Assembly of Pakistan from August 2018 till August 2023. Previously he was a member of the National Assembly from June 2013 to May 2018.

== Early life ==
He was born on 2 March 1972.

== Political career ==
He served as Mayor of Sargodha.

He ran for the seat of the National Assembly of Pakistan as a candidate of Pakistan Muslim League (N) (PML-N) from Constituency NA-66 (Sargodha-III) in the 2002 Pakistani general election but was unsuccessful. He received 29,496 votes and lost the seat to Tasneem Ahmed Qureshi.

He ran for the seat of National Assembly as a candidate of PML-N from Constituency NA-66 (Sargodha-III) in the 2008 Pakistani general election but was unsuccessful. He received 65,020 votes and lost the seat to Tasneem Ahmed Qureshi. In the same election, he ran for the seat of the Provincial Assembly of the Punjab as an independent candidate from Constituency PP-33 (Sargodha-VI) but was unsuccessful. He received 236 votes and lost the seat to Chaudhry Abdul Razzaq Dhillon.

He was elected to the National Assembly as a candidate of PML-N from Constituency NA-66 (Sargodha-III) in the 2013 Pakistani general election. He received 133,085 votes and defeated Mumtaz Kahloon. During his tenure as Member of the National Assembly, he served as the Federal Parliamentary Secretary for Kashmir Affairs and Gilgit Baltistan.

He was re-elected to the National Assembly as a candidate of PML-N from Constituency NA-90 (Sargodha-III) in the 2018 Pakistani general election.
