= Chak 124 NB =

- Village
- Location in Pakistan
- Coordinates: 32°11′18″N 73°01′43″E
- Country: Pakistan
- Province: Punjab
- District: Sargodha
- Tehsil: Sillanwali

Chak 124 NB or Chak No. 124 NB is a village in Sillanwali Tehsil of Sargodha District, in Punjab, Pakistan.
