= PP-78 Sargodha-VIII =

Constituency of the Punjabi Provincial Legislature, Pakistan

- Constituency for the Provincial Assembly of Punjab
- Region: Sillanwali Tehsil and Sargodha Tehsil (partly) of Sargodha District

Current constituency
- Created from: PP-36 Sarghoda-IX (2002–2018); PP-79 Sargodha-VIII (2018-2023)

PP-78 Sargodha-VIII (پی پی-78، سرگودھا-8) is a Constituency of Provincial Assembly of Punjab.

== General elections 2024 ==
Provincial election 2024: PP-78 Sargodha-VIII
Party	Candidate	Votes	%	±%
PML(N)	Rana Munawar Hussain	60,569	43.18	
Independent	Waqar Anwar	57,607	41.06	
Independent	Muhammad Ali Khan	8,461	6.03	
PPP	Hassan Raza Bhatti	3,212	2.29	
Independent	Zulqarnain	2,887	2.06	
Others	Others (nineteen candidates)	7,549	5.38	
Turnout		144,053	53.54	
Total valid votes		140,285	97.38	
Rejected ballots		3,768	2.62	
Majority		2,962	2.12	
Registered electors		269,081		
hold				

== General elections 2018 ==
Provincial election 2018: PP-79 Sargodha-VIII
Party	Candidate	Votes	%	±%
PML(N)	Rana Munawar Hussain	54,323	42.23	
PTI	Faisal Javed	39,075	30.37	
Independent	Muhammad Akbar Sandhu	16,456	12.79	
Independent	Hamid Raza	7,783	6.05	
PPP	Hassan Raza Bhatti	2,360	1.83	
Independent	Muhammad Mumtaz	1,398	1.09	
Independent	Muhammad Shahid Saleem	1,076	0.84	
Others	Others (fifteen candidates)	6,181	4.80	
Turnout		132,190	60.42	
Total valid votes		128,652	97.32	
Rejected ballots		3,538	2.68	
Majority		15,248	11.86	
Registered electors		218,781		

== General elections 2013 ==
Provincial election 2013 : PP-36 Sargodha-IX
Party	Candidate	Votes	%	±%
PML(N)	Rana Munawar Hussain	37,509	37.24	
Independent	Ch. Faisal Javaid Ghumman	28,398	28.19	
Independent	Malik Nazir Ahmad Sobhi	18,602	18.47	
Independent	Rai Khurram Ziafat Panah Bhatti	6,016	5.97	
PTI	Ch. Imran Mehdi Gujjar	4,250	4.22	
PPP	Muhammad Shah Ali Rajput	2,152	2.14	
JUI (F)	Maulana Muhammad Arif Rana	1,050	1.04	
Others	Others (twelve candidates)	2,751	2.73	
Turnout		105,296	62.87	
Total valid votes		100,728	95.66	
Rejected ballots		4,568	4.34	
Majority		9,111	9.05	
Registered electors		167,491		

== General elections 2008 ==
Provincial election 2008 : PP-36 Sargodha-IX
Party	Candidate	Votes	%	±%
PPP	Rana Munawar Hussain alias Rana Munawar Ghous Khan	33,221	42.20	
PML(Q)	Ch. Faisal Javaid Ghuman	30,427	38.65	
PML(N)	Mian Muhammad Ahmed Kalyar	14,244	18.09	
Others	Others	827	1.05	
Turnout		80,876	46.27	
Total valid votes		78,719	97.33	
Rejected ballots		2,157	2.67	
Majority		2,794	3.55	
Registered electors		174,786		

== General elections 2002 ==
Contesting candidates	Party affiliation	Votes polled
Major asghar Hayat Kalyar	Independ ent	30,422

== See also ==
- PP-77 Sargodha-VII
- PP-79 Sargodha-IX
