= Chak 2 NB =

- Village
- Location in Pakistan
- Coordinates: 32°11′18″N 73°01′43″E
- Country: Pakistan
- Province: Punjab
- District: Sargodha
- Tehsil: Bhalwal

Chak 2 NB is a village in Bhalwal Tehsil, Sargodha District, Punjab, Pakistan.

The village is approximately 7 kilometres (4.3 mi) from the city of Bhalwal.
