= PP-72 Sargodha-II =

Constituency of the Punjabi Provincial Legislature, Pakistan

- Constituency for the Provincial Assembly of Punjab
- Region: Bhalwal Tehsil (partly) including Bhalwal city of Sargodha District

Current constituency
- Created from: PP-30 Sarghoda-III & PP-29 Sargodha-II (2002–2018); PP-73 Sargodha-II (2018-2023)

PP-72 Sargodha-II (پی پی-72، سرگودھا-2) is a Constituency of Provincial Assembly of Punjab.

== General elections 2024 ==
Provincial election 2024: PP-72 Sargodha-II
Party	Candidate	Votes	%	±%
PML(N)	Mansoor Azam	50,545	34.83	
Independent	Chaudhry Sohail Akhtar (Note: Filed nomination papers as PTI candidate but ECP allowed him to run as an Independent)	41,392	28.52	
PPP	Zahid Iqbal Gauri	16,407	11.31	
Independent	Muhammad Usman Ali Tiwana	14,498	9.99	
TLP	Asif Ali Choudhry	7,974	5.50	
Independent	Tariq Mehmood	6,992	4.82	
JI	Mubbashar Ahmad	5,395	3.72	
Others	Others (six candidates)	1,909	1.31	
Turnout		150,342	50.73	
Total valid votes		145,112	96.52	
Rejected ballots		5,230	3.48	
Majority		9,153	6.31	
Registered electors		296,359		
hold				

== General elections 2018 ==
Provincial election 2018: PP-73 Sargodha-II
Party	Candidate	Votes	%	±%
PML(N)	Yasir Zafar Sandhu	45,778	33.90	
PTI	Khaliq Dad	30,087	22.28	
Independent	Chaudhary Sohail Akhtar	17,738	13.14	
PPP	ijaz Sherazi	11,073	8.20	
Independent	Zafar Abbas	8,330	6.17	
Independent	Ghulam Dastagir Lak	6,728	4.98	
MMA	Moyassar Ahmad	4,717	3.49	
TLP	Muhammad ljaz	3,826	2.83	
Independent	Sohail Mushtaq	3,597	2.66	
Others	Others (eight candidates)	3,156	2.34	
Turnout		140,809	55.99	
Total valid votes		135,030	95.90	
Rejected ballots		5,779	4.10	
Majority		15,691	11.62	
Registered electors		251,471		

== General elections 2013 ==
Provincial election 2013: PP-30 Sargodha-III
Party	Candidate	Votes	%	±%
PML(N)	Chaudhry Tahir Ahmad Sindhu Advocate	37,624	44.10	
Independent	Rao Abdul Qayoom	15,786	18.50	
Independent	Mian Abdul Qadeer Ahmad	9,527	11.17	
Independent	Ansar Abbas	7,089	8.31	
PPP	Muhammad Ashraf Gondal	5,138	6.02	
PTI	Naeem Ahmad Yar Jaspal	3,762	4.41	
Independent	Syed Fida Hussain Shah	3,034	3.56	
Others	Others (nine candidates)	3,356	3.93	
Turnout		89,265	58.85	
Total valid votes		85,316	95.58	
Rejected ballots		3,949	4.42	
Majority		21,838	25.60	
Registered electors		151,696		

== General elections 2008 ==
Provincial election 2008: PP-30 Sargodha-III
Party	Candidate	Votes	%	±%
Independent	Tahir Ahmed Sidhu	20,802	32.13	
PPP	Nafees Ahmed Herl	16,709	25.81	
PML(N)	Mian Muhammad Ahmed Faisal Ranjha	16,523	25.52	
PML(Q)	Mian Abdul Qadeer	10,157	15.69	
Others	Others	553	0.85	
Turnout		67,809	42.72	
Total valid votes		64,744	95.48	
Rejected ballots		3,065	4.52	
Majority		4,093	6.32	
Registered electors		158,729		

== See also ==
- PP-71 Sargodha-I
- PP-73 Sargodha-III
