= PP-73 Sargodha-III =

Constituency of the Punjabi Provincial Legislature, Pakistan

- Constituency for the Provincial Assembly of Punjab
- Region: Kot Momin Tehsil (partly) including Kot Momin town of Sargodha District

Current constituency
- Created from: PP-31 Sarghoda-IV & PP-29 Sargodha-II (2002–2018); PP-74 Sargodha-III (2018-2023)

PP-73 Sargodha-III (پی پی-73، سرگودھا-3) is a Constituency of Provincial Assembly of Punjab.

== By-election 2025 ==
By-election 2025: PP-73 Sargodha-III
Party	Candidate	Votes	%	±%
PML(N)	Mian Sultan Ali Ranjha	71,770	75.45	
PRHP	Mehr Mohsin Raza	12,970	13.64	
IPP	Muhammad Haris	10,139	10.66	
PST	Haq Nawaz Ranjha	245	0.25	
Turnout		95,772	34.22	
Total valid votes		95,124	99.32	
Rejected ballots		648	0.68	
Majority		58,800	61.81	
Registered electors		277,970		
hold				

== General elections 2024 ==
Provincial election 2024: PP-73 Sargodha-III
Party	Candidate	Votes	%	±%
Independent	Muhammad Ansar Iqbal (Note: Filed nomination papers as PTI candidate but ECP allowed him to run as an Independent)	58,242	44.75	
PML(N)	Mian Sultan Ali Ranjha	46,514	35.74	
TLP	Rab Nawaz	9,369	7.20	
PPP	Muhammad Awais Ranjha	8,580	6.59	
JI	Umar Farooq	2,835	2.18	
Others	Others (seven candidates)	4,620	3.54	
Turnout		134,424	50.48	
Total valid votes		130,160	96.83	
Rejected ballots		4,264	3.17	
Majority		11,728	9.01	
Registered electors		266,297		
hold				

== General elections 2018 ==
Provincial election 2018: PP-74 Sargodha-III
Party	Candidate	Votes	%	±%
PML(N)	Mian Manazar Hussain Ranjha	51,526	42.45	
PTI	Muhammad Ansar Iqbal	50,382	41.51	
PPP	Mian Mazhar Ali Ranjha	11,860	9.77	
TLP	Sikandar Hayat Ranjha	5,251	4.33	
Independent	Muntaha Afzaal	1,831	1.51	
Others	Others (two candidates)	528	0.44	
Turnout		124,762	57.18	
Total valid votes		121,378	97.29	
Rejected ballots		3,384	2.71	
Majority		1,144	0.94	
Registered electors		218,208		

== General elections 2013 ==
Provincial election 2013: PP-31 Sargodha-IV
Party	Candidate	Votes	%	±%
PML(N)	Mian Munazir Hussain Ranjha	29,841	37.03	
Independent	Muhammad Aslam	15,321	19.01	
Independent	Mian Mazhar Ali Ranjha	13,985	17.35	
PTI	Ansar Iqbal Haral	12,235	15.18	
Independent	Zeeshan Ahmad Ali Ranjha	3,353	4.16	
Independent	Khalid Safdar Makhdoom	3,241	4.02	
JI	Ahmad Sher Sipra	1,232	1.53	
Others	Others (five candidates)	1,381	1.72	
Turnout		83,890	63.68	
Total valid votes		80,589	96.07	
Rejected ballots		3,301	3.93	
Majority		14,520	18.02	
Registered electors		131,741		

== General elections 2008 ==
Provincial election 2008: PP-31 Sargodha-IV
Party	Candidate	Votes	%	±%
PPP	Ch. Muhammad Awais Aslam Madhana	25,902	41.45	
PML(Q)	Manazar Hussain Ranjah	20,476	32.77	
PML(N)	Mazhar Ali Ranjah	15,840	25.35	
Others	Others	274	0.44	
Turnout		64,735	44.68	
Total valid votes		62,492	96.54	
Rejected ballots		2,243	3.46	
Majority		5,426	8.68	
Registered electors		144,885		

== See also ==
- PP-72 Sargodha-II
- PP-74 Sargodha-IV
