= Chak 147/148 NB =

Chak No. 147/148 NB (لکھوآنہ)
- Village
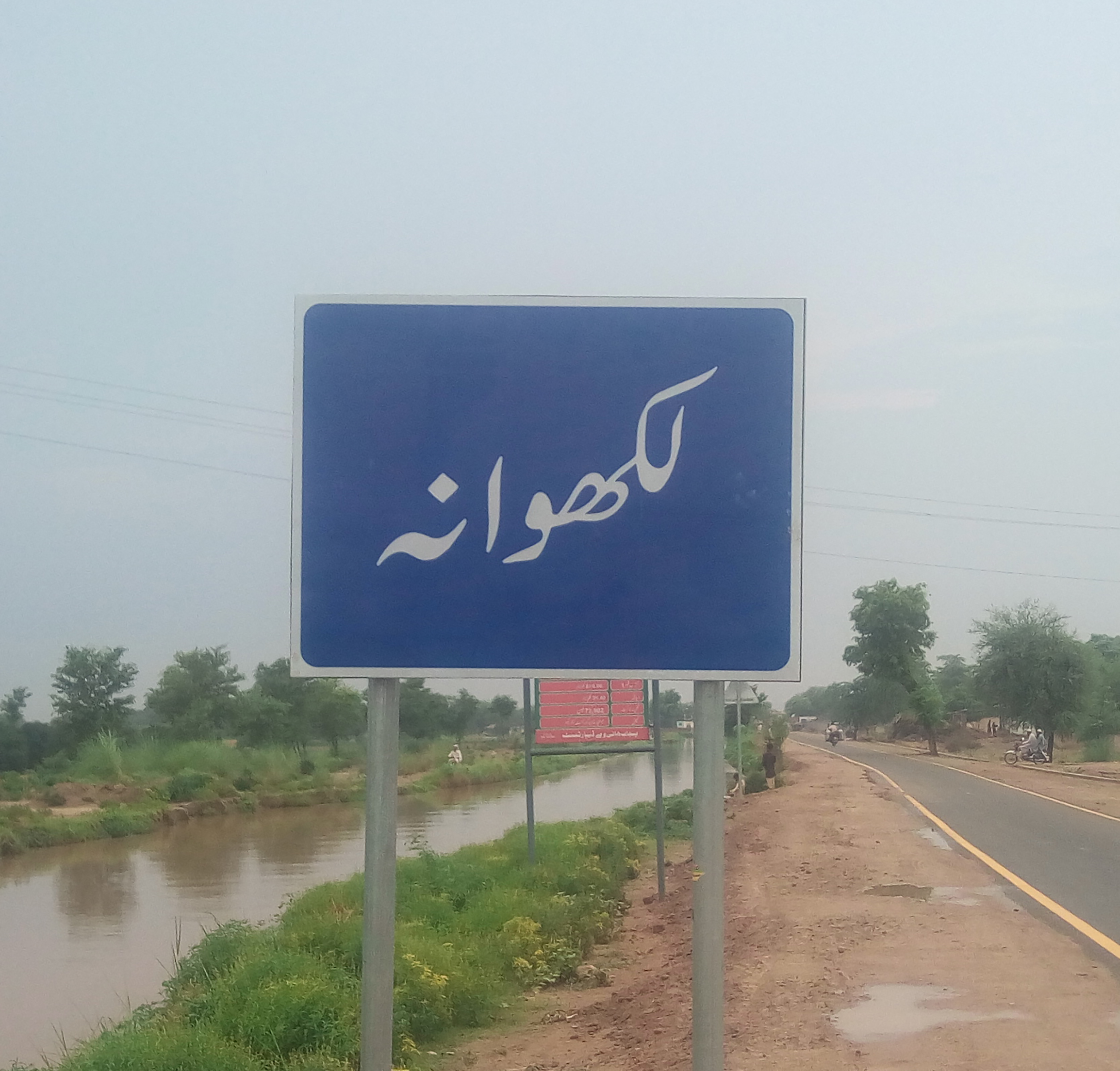
- Northern entrance to the village

- Location in Pakistan Chak No. 147/148 NB (Pakistan)
- Coordinates: 31°47′21″N 72°28′28.3″E
- Country: Pakistan
- Province: Punjab
- District: Sargodha
- Tehsil: Sillanwali
- Union Council: 121

Government
  - Type: Union Council

Area
  - Total: 10 km^{2} (3.9 sq mi)
- Elevation: 175 m (574 ft)

Population (2017)
  - Total: 4,578
- Time zone: UTC+5:00 (PST)
- Postal Code: 40010
- ISO 3166 code: PK-PB
- Post Office: Sillanwali

Chak 147/148 NB, also known as Lakhwana, is a village in Sillanwali town of District Sargodha, Punjab, Pakistan. It is situated 42 km from Sargodha City and 9 km from its Tehsil Sillanwali at Lakhowana Road. It is also known as Lakhowana (Punjabi and Urdu: لکھوآنہ).

== Overview ==
It is a Union Council No. 121 of the neighboring villages. It is surrounded by a canal, Rajbah Naurang. The primary source of income in this village is agriculture but most of the people of the village have jobs in the public and private sectors.

== History ==
This village came to existence in early 19th century. Before then, all of the area from Shahnikdar to Shaheenabad consists of bushes and other plants. It looked like pasture so people living in Sargodha and its neighboring villages went there to graze animals and they returned after weeks. Ancestors told that the place where the village is situated was a plain ground among those bushes and irregular topography of the land so this place was suitable to live so at night, they encamped there. But they had to face a big trouble there was no source of fresh water so they used to bring water with them but later on, they found a low-lying area on the south west of the today's village that had the capability of collecting rainwater so they brought their animals to this pond to drink water and initially they built temporary mud buildings to protect animals and themselves from harsh weather conditions like storms, rains and sun etc. Afterward some people permanently settled at that place and it is said that a person named Lakho (Urdu: لکھو) lived here and name of the village Lakhowana (Urdu: لکھوآنہ) made from his name. In this way the village came to existence and after the partition of British India, this village was properl.Last time National assembly no 91 but changed into NA 85.

== Union Council ==
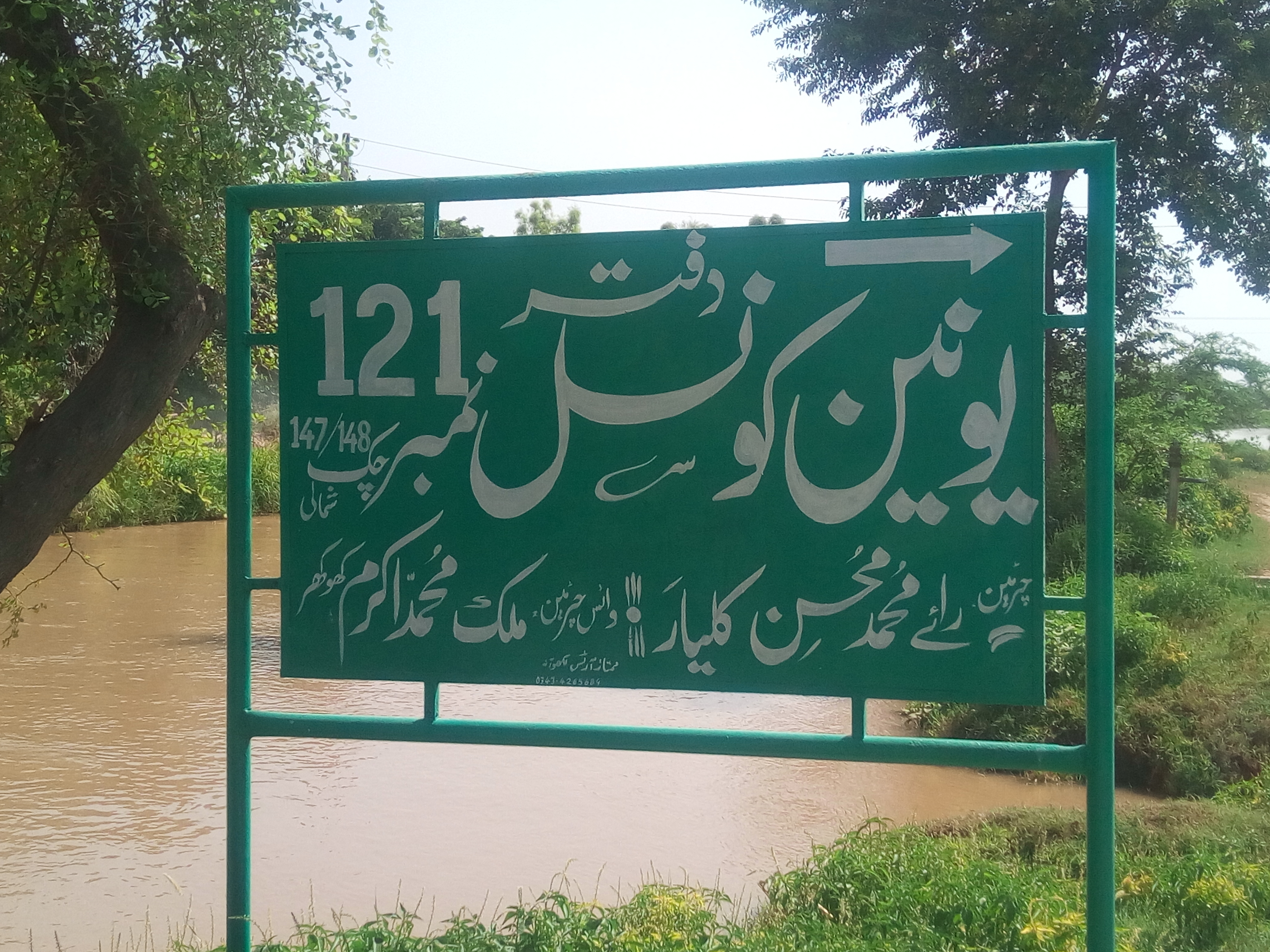
Sign board of Union council 121

This village is the headquarters of Union Council 121, which consists on the following villages.

- Chak No. 147/148 NB
- Chak No. 143 NB
- Chak No. 146 NB
- Chak No. 149/150 NB

== Facilities ==
Government of Punjab provided medical and educational facilities to this village

=== Medical Facilities ===
The Basic Health Unit Urdu: بنیادی مرکزِ صحت) is provided to village by the government. It provides all Primary Health Center (PHC) services along with integral services that include basic medical and surgical care, CDD, CDC, ARI, Malaria and TB control.

=== Educational Facilities ===
Government of Punjab has provided High School for Boys and Elementary School for Girls.

- Government Boys High School
- Government Girls Elementary School

== Notable Persons ==
- Atta Muhammad Sialvi was the former Imam of Jamia Masjid of the village.
- Colonel Saleh Muhammad was the former headman (Numbardar) of the village.
