= Chak 130 SB =

- Village
- Location in Pakistan Chak 130 SB (Punjab, Pakistan)
- Coordinates: 31°50′0″N 73°38′0″E
- Country: Pakistan
- Province: Punjab, Pakistan
- District: Sargodha
- Tehsil: Sillanwali

Chak 130 SB is a village in Sillanwali Tehsil, Sargodha District in Punjab, Pakistan. Its neighbouring villages are Chak 132 SB, Chak 131 SB, Chak 28 SB, and Chak 50 SB. This village is an agricultural area.

Being a part of Kirana Bar, it was colonized by the British Raj after World War I. Almost all of the villagers were immigrants who came at the time of the Partition of India. Most of the immigrants belonged to the Jalandhar, Amritsar, and Ambala districts of pre-partitioned Punjab.

== Demographics ==
The population of the village, according to 2017 census was 3,417.
