= PP-71 Sargodha-I =

Constituency of the Punjabi Provincial Legislature, Pakistan

- Constituency for the Provincial Assembly of Punjab
- Region: Bhera Tehsil and Bhalwal Tehsil (partly) of Sargodha District

Current constituency
- Created from: PP-28 Sargodha-I & PP-29 Sargodha-II (2002–2018); PP-72 Sargodha-I (2018-2023)

PP-71 Sargodha-I (پی پی-71، سرگودھا-1) is a Constituency of Provincial Assembly of Punjab.

== General elections 2024 ==
Provincial election 2024: PP-71 Sargodha-I
Party	Candidate	Votes	%	±%
PML(N)	Shoaib Ahmed Malik	55,292	39.51	
Independent	Naeem Haider (Note: Filed nomination papers as PTI candidate but ECP allowed him to run as an Independent)	49,161	35.13	
Independent	Muhammad Farooq Baha UI Haq Shah	21,678	15.49	
TLP	Rana Muhammad Hanif	7,446	5.32	
JI	Abdul Munam	2,097	1.50	
Others	Others (ten candidates)	4,270	3.05	
Turnout		144,122	54.03	
Total valid votes		139,944	97.10	
Rejected ballots		4,178	2.90	
Majority		6,131	4.38	
Registered electors		266,757		
hold				

== General elections 2018 ==
Provincial election 2018: PP-72 Sargodha-I
Party	Candidate	Votes	%	±%
PML(N)	Shoaib Ahmed Malik	64,908	46.29	
PTI	Hassan Inam Piracha	56,989	40.64	
PPP	Muhammad Rizwan	5,123	3.65	
TLP	Aqeel Ahmad	4,071	2.90	
Independent	Ghulam Mustafa	3,198	2.28	
MMA	Zubair Anmad Gondal	2,210	1.58	
Independent	Shafeeq Ahmad	2,200	1.57	
Others	Others (five candidates)	1,531	1.07	
Turnout		144,115	58.78	
Total valid votes		140,230	97.30	
Rejected ballots		3,885	2.70	
Majority		7,919	5.65	
Registered electors		245,193		

== General elections 2013 ==
Provincial election 2013: PP-28 Sargodha-I
Party	Candidate	Votes	%	±%
PML(N)	Doctor Mukhtar Ahmad Bharath	58,531	57.75	
PTI	Hassan Inam Piracha	32,657	32.22	
PPP	Malik Rizwan Asif Ghughiat	6,749	6.66	
JI	Rana Khursheed Ali Khan	2,888	2.85	
Others	Others (four candidates)	530	0.52	
Turnout		104,848	61.43	
Total valid votes		101,355	96.67	
Rejected ballots		3,493	3.33	
Majority		25,874	25.53	
Registered electors		170,693		

== General elections 2008 ==
Provincial election 2008: PP-28 Sargodha-I
Party	Candidate	Votes	%	±%
PML(Q)	Dr. Malik Mukhtar Ahmed Bharath	45,686	61.30	
PPP	Haji Mushtaq Ahmed Gondal	19,477	26.14	
PML(N)	Muhammad Muhsan Shah	6,376	8.56	
PST	Peer Syed Mudassar Shah	2,622	3.52	
Independent	Muhammad Farooq Baha-ul-Haq Shah	363	0.49	
Turnout		76,758	42.83	
Total valid votes		74,524	97.09	
Rejected ballots		2,234	2.91	
Majority		26,209	35.16	
Registered electors		179,208		

== See also ==
- PP-70 Gujranwala-XII
- PP-72 Sargodha-II
