= Chak 169 NB =

Chak 169 NB چک ١٦٩ شمالی
- Village
- Location in Pakistan
- Coordinates: 31°41′51″N 72°26′41″E
- Country: Pakistan
- Province: Punjab
- District: Sargodha
- Tehsil: Sillanwali

Chak 169 NB is a village in Sillanwali Tehsil, Sargodha District, Punjab, Pakistan. According to the 2017 census, it has a population of 3,217.
