= Chak 10/ML =

- Village
- Location in Pakistan
- Coordinates: 32°21′30.3″N 72°55′10.2″E
- Country: Pakistan
- Province: Punjab
- District: Sargodha

Chak 10/ML is a village in Bhalwal Tehsil, Sargodha District, Punjab, Pakistan. According to the 2017 census, it has a population of 3,488.
