= Chak 135 SB =

- Village
- Location in Pakistan
- Coordinates: 31°50′17.9″N 72°35′10.3″E
- Country: Pakistan
- Province: Punjab
- District: Sargodha

Chak 135 SB is a village in Sillanwali Tehsil, Sargodha District, Punjab, Pakistan. According to the 2017 census, it has a population of 4,792.
