= Chak 49 SB =

- Village
- Location in Pakistan
- Coordinates: 32°11′23.4″N 72°41′41.3″E
- Country: Pakistan
- Province: Punjab
- District: Sargodha

Chak 49 SB is a village in Sillanwali Tehsil, Sargodha District, Punjab, Pakistan. According to the 2017 census, it has a population of 1,853.
