= Chak 11/SB =

- Village
- Location in Pakistan
- Coordinates: 32°9′29.9″N 72°59′46.4″E
- Country: Pakistan
- Province: Punjab
- District: Sargodha

Chak 11/SB is a village in Kotmomin Tehsil, Sargodha District, Punjab, Pakistan. According to the 2017 census. it has a population of 4,657.
