= Chak 132 SB =

- Village
- Location in Pakistan
- Coordinates: 31°49′58″N 72°37′45″E
- Country: Pakistan
- Province: Punjab
- District: Sargodha
- Tehsil: Sillanwali

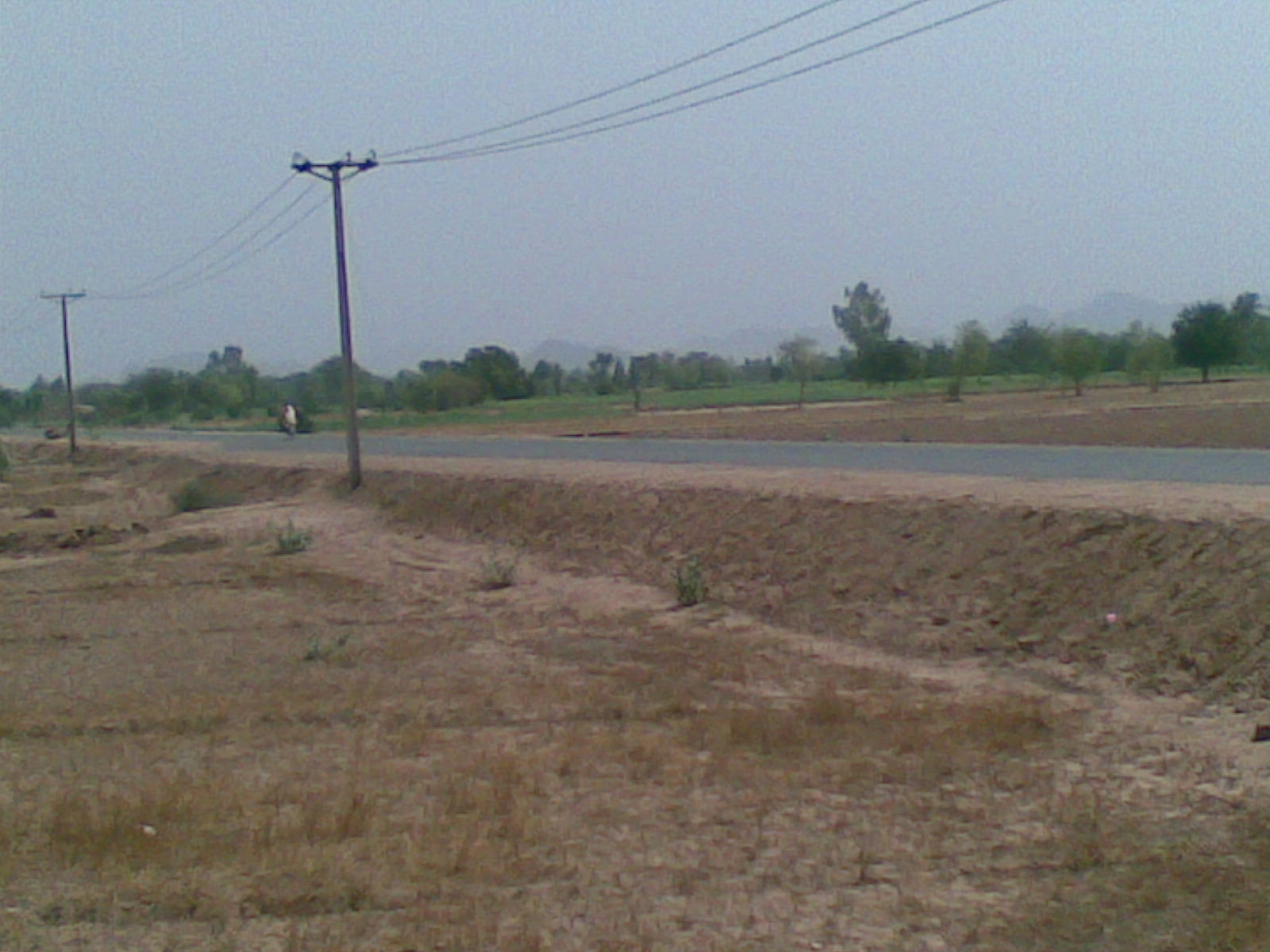
Chak I32 Ner Base Line.

Chak 132 SB is a village in Sillanwali Tehsil of Sargodha District in Punjab, Pakistan. It is an agricultural area.

Being a part of Kirana Bar it was colonised by the British after World War I, when all of the village land was handed over to retired armed personnels of the British Army, and the original inhabitants of the village were forcibly evicted and had their lands seized.

Most of the land is owned by Jat, Rajput, Mughals and Arain families.

== Education ==
The village has multiple schools:

- Girls Secondary School
- Boys Secondary School
- White Crescent School
