= PP-74 Sargodha-IV =

Constituency of the Punjabi Provincial Legislature, Pakistan

- Constituency for the Provincial Assembly of Punjab
- Region: Kot Momin Tehsil (partly) and Sargodha Tehsil (partly) of Sargodha District

Current constituency
- Created from: PP-32 Sarghoda-V (2002–2018); PP-75 Sargodha-IV (2018-2023)

PP-74 Sargodha-IV (پی پی-74، سرگودھا-4) is a Constituency of Provincial Assembly of Punjab.

== General elections 2024 ==
Provincial election 2024: PP-74 Sargodha-IV
Party	Candidate	Votes	%	±%
PML(N)	Ikram UI Haq	51,651	38.01	
Independent	Nadeem Muhammad Akram (Note: Filed nomination papers as PTI candidate but ECP allowed him to run as an Independent)	34,716	25.55	
Independent	Muhammad Shahbaz	21,583	15.88	
Independent	Muhammad Muneeb Sultan Cheema	11,732	8.63	
TLP	Muhammad Asif	5,067	3.73	
JI	Muddasar Khalid	3,658	2.69	
PPP	Ilyas Mehmood	2,348	1.73	
Independent	Ahmad Bilal Siddique	2,141	1.58	
Others	Others (thirteen candidates)	3,004	2.20	
Turnout		143,375	54.67	
Total valid votes		135,900	94.79	
Rejected ballots		7,475	5.21	
Majority		16,935	12.46	
Registered electors		262,257		
hold				

== General elections 2018 ==
Provincial election 2018: PP-75 Sargodha-IV
Party	Candidate	Votes	%	±%
PTI	Muhammad Muneeb Sultan Cheema	63,356	47.30	
PML(N)	Muhammad Umar Kalyar	50,477	37.68	
Independent	Ikraam UI Haq	19,371	14.46	
Others	Others (two candidates)	751	0.56	
Turnout		137,319	60.92	
Total valid votes		133,955	97.55	
Rejected ballots		3,364	2.45	
Majority		12,879	9.62	
Registered electors		225,406		

== General elections 2013 ==
Provincial election 2013: PP-32 Sargodha-V
Party	Candidate	Votes	%	±%
PML(Q)	Ch. Aamir Sultan Cheema	55,358	48.99	
PML(N)	Malik Shoaib Awan	43,221	38.25	
JI	Hafiz Farhan Ahmed Gujjar	7,295	6.46	
PTI	Saud Ul Hassan Chatha	5,098	4.51	
Independent	Ch. Muhammad Arshad Dhillon	1,275	1.13	
Others	Others (four candidates)	755	0.66	
Turnout		116,168	62.94	
Total valid votes		113,002	97.27	
Rejected ballots		3,166	2.73	
Majority		12,137	10.74	
Registered electors		184,576		

== General elections 2008 ==
Provincial election 2008: PP-32 Sargodha-V
Party	Candidate	Votes	%	±%
PML(Q)	Ch. Aamar Sultan Cheema	48,522	55.27	
PPP	Mian Muhammad Khalid Kalyar	34,853	39.70	
PML(N)	Ahtesham Ahemd Cheema	2,631	3.00	
Independent	Mohsin Shah Nawaz Ranjha	1,036	1.18	
Others	Others	745	0.85	
Turnout		89,706	46.64	
Total valid votes		87,787	97.86	
Rejected ballots		1,919	2.14	
Majority		13,669	15.57	
Registered electors		192,336		

== See also ==
- PP-73 Sargodha-III
- PP-75 Sargodha-V
