= Chak 8/NB =

- Village
- Location in Pakistan
- Coordinates: 32°16′14.5″N 72°54′18.0″E
- Country: Pakistan
- Province: Punjab
- District: Sargodha

Chak 8/NB is a village in Bhalwal Tehsil, Sargodha District, Punjab, Pakistan. According to the 2017 census, it has a population of 3,768.
