= Chak 104 NB, Punjab, Pakistan =

Village in Sargodha District, Punjab, Pakistan

Chak 104 NB
- Location within Pakistan
- Coordinates: 32.00°N 72.33°E
- Country: Pakistan
- Province: Punjab
- District: Sargodha
- Elevation: 180 m (590 ft)

Population (2017 Pakistani census)
  - Total: 6,737
- Time zone: UTC+5 (PST)

Chak 104 NB is a village in the Punjab province of Pakistan. It is part of the tehsil and district of Sargodha and lies 10 km west of Sargodha city.

Development projects were started after the independence of Pakistan, including water supply, transportation, education, sports and health facilities.

== History ==
Chak 104 NB was given the title of Model Village of Punjab in 1965 by General Musa Khan, then the governor of West Pakistan.

Dr. Chaudhry Nasar Ullah Khan Ghuman played a vital role in the social, economical, political and intellectual development not only of the village but of the whole area.

Brig(r) Saad Ullah Khan (14 Punjab) Swordian was awarded Hilal e Jurat in 1971. He was the brother of Dr. Nasrullah Khan.
