= Chak 111 NB =

- Village
- Location in Pakistan
- Coordinates: 31°50′42.4″N 72°33′24.8″E
- Country: Pakistan
- Province: Punjab
- District: Sargodha

Chak 111 NB is a village in Sillanwali Tehsil, Sargodha District, Punjab, Pakistan. According to the 2017 census, it has a population of 2,767.
