= Ghias Mela =

Pakistani politician (1961–2015)

Chaudhry Ghias Ahmed Mela
- چوہدری غیاث احمد میلہ

Federal Minister for Human Resource Development
- In office 26 June 2012 – 26 June 2015

Senior Vice President Pakistan Muslim League (Q)
- In office ? – 17 March 2015

Member of the 13th National Assembly
- In office 17 March 2008 – 16 March 2013
- Constituency: NA-65 Sargodha-II

Member of the 12th National Assembly
- In office 16 November 2002 – 15 November 2007
- Constituency: NA-65 Sargodha-II

Member of the 11th National Assembly
- In office 15 February 1997 – 12 December 1999
- Constituency: NA-48 Sargodha-II

Personal details
- Born: 17 September 1961 Sargodha, Punjab, West Pakistan
- Died: 26 June 2015 (aged 53) Dallas, Texas, USA
- Resting place: Ancestral graveyard in Kot Khuda Baksh Mela village, Sargodha District
- Party: Pakistan Tehreek-e-Insaf (joined 17 March 2015)
- Other political affiliations: PML-Q (1997—2015)
- Relations: Bakhtiar Mela (brother)
- Children: 3, including Usama Ghias Mela
- Education: Lahore American School; Lawrence College Ghora Gali; PAF College Sargodha; University of Evansville (BBA, MBA)

Chaudhry Ghias Ahmed Mela (چوہدری غیاث احمد میلہ;17 September 1961 – 27 June 2015) was a Pakistani politician who was a three time Member of National Assembly (1997–1999, 2002–2007, 2008–2013) from Sargodha. He hails from the Mela village of Kot Momin Tehsil, in Sargodha District and was an agriculturist by profession. He was a member of the PML-Q and held the post of senior vice president of the party until March 2015, when he joined the Pakistan Tehreek-e-Insaf.

He had also served as the Chairman of the standing committee for housing under the PML-Q regime (2002–2007) and as Federal Minister of State for the Ministry of Human Resource Development (2012–2013).

== Early life ==
Ghias was born in Kot Momin Tehsil of Sargodha District on 17 September 1961 to Chaudhary Khuda Baksh Mela.

== Personal life ==
Ghias was married and has a family consisting of two sons and a daughter.

One of his sons, Usama Ghias Mela, is the District President of the Sargodha Wing of Imran Khans Pakistan Tehreek-e-Insaf.

=== Education ===
Ghias completed his early education from Lawrence College Ghora Gali and Lahore American School. His higher education includes a BBA degree and an MBA degree from the University of Evansville, Indiana.

== Political career ==
Ghias became a member of District Council Sargodha in 1991.

Ghias was named the Federal Minister of State for Ministry of Overseas Pakistanis and Human Resource Development in June 2012, (previously termed Ministry of Labour and Manpower), under the prime ministership of Raja Pervez Ashraf.

=== 1997 General Election ===
He became a Member of the National Assembly in the 1997 General Elections for the first time from constituency NA-48 Sargodha II.

=== 2002 General Election ===
Ghias received 62,306 votes and won a seat in the National Assembly in the 2002 General Elections on a PML-Q ticket from constituency NA-65 Sargodha-II.

=== 2008 General Election ===
Ghias received 53,518 votes and won a seat in the National Assembly in the 2008 General Elections on a PML-Q ticket from constituency NA-65 Sargodha-II.

=== 2013 General Election ===
Ghias received 60,558 votes and was a runner-up in the 2013 Pakistani general election.

== Death ==
He went overseas for treatment to Texas for his heart which was enlarging due to a vena cava blockage as a result of chronic smoking. Soon after successful heart surgery, he was shifted to the ventilator for a few hours for a better oxygen supply. His lungs failed to perform ample function and Ghias died at 7:00 AM on 27 June 2015 due to cardiac arrest.

=== Funeral ===
His funeral was held in Kot Khuda Baksh Mela village on 1 July 2015, and he was buried in the graveyard of his forefathers. The funeral was attended by PML-Q Chief Former Prime Minister of Pakistan Shujaat Hussain, Chaudhry Aamir Sultan Cheema, Khalid Ranjha, Shah Mahmood Qureshi, Chaudhry Abdul Razzaq Dhillon, and other local politicians and civilians.
