= Shah Nikdar =

- Town
- Location within Pakistan
- Coordinates: 31°39′N 72°20′E
- Country: Pakistan
- Province: Punjab
- District: Sargodha
- Time zone: UTC+5 (PST)

Shah Nikdar (Punjabi, Urdu:شاہ نکڈر) is a small town in Sargodha District, Punjab, Pakistan on Sargodha's border with Jhang District. It is a part of Sillanwali Tehsil and 26 km from the Sillanwali.

Estimated population range of Shah Nikdar is from 50,000 to 60,000 peoples. Most of population or their ancestors are migrated from India at the time of independence of Pakistan.

== Description ==
The original name of Shah Nikdar was "Rudkin Shah" or "Radkin Shah". The town has a police station, post office, railway station, telephone exchange, civil hospital, basic health unit and United Bank. In 1926 The British Government approved Shah Nikdar as railway station. The existing station upgraded & converted in to crossing line in 1990.

Most of the people here belongs to Gujjar, Arain Sheikh, Bhatti rajpoot kalyar Malik rajana sial and other local community. Businesses activities are run by the stand all community. The population includes refugees who came from India during partition 1947.

A distributary link canal (Rajbah Norang) from Lower Jehlum Canal irrigates the land of this town. The nearby most populated village 155Nb 154Nb 156Nb 159Nb 160Nb 174Nb is 157 NB. People living in the village are refuges of East Punjab (Gujjars, Rajpoots, Araiens & Sheikhs mhar Malik sial kalyar and other local community people's

The famous locally played games in Shah Nikdar are cricket and volleyball. Volleyball is much liked among the youngsters, especially the peoples of All village . The Punjab Government has recently announced to rehabilitate & link the existing road with LHR- ISLD motorway through Kot Momin interchange. Approximately 100 KM distance will come short in between ISLD - T T Sigh section via Jhang. This area will attract business community for major capital investment.

== Education ==
Before the partition there were two primary schools for boys & girls, later on these upgraded to middle level, now both are Government High Schools.

A Government College for Women exists in the town.

== Hospital ==
There is a civil hospital in the town.

== Transport ==
The local station in Shah Nikdur is the Shah Nikdur railway station. Buses service available in the city include: 1st Shah Nikdar to Lahore Three bus 2 Buses Shah Nikdar to going Faisalabad And many times, Shalimar bus company to all over Pakistan.
