= Chak 131 NB =

- Village
- Location in Pakistan
- Coordinates: 31°40′19.5″N 72°27′37.7″E
- Country: Pakistan
- Province: Punjab
- District: Sargodha

Chak 131 NB is a village in Sillanwali Tehsil, Sargodha District, Punjab, Pakistan. According to the 2017 census, it has a population of 2,992.
