= Mona Punjab =

Mona Punjabمونہ پنجاب
- Village
- Location of Mona, Punjab, in West Pakistan
- Coordinates: 33°02′08″N 72°57′53″E
- Country: Pakistan
- Province: Punjab
- District: Sargodha
- Tehsil: Bhalwal

Population
  - Total: 3,000
- Time zone: UTC+5 (PST)

Mona Punjab (Urdu مونہ پنجاب) is a village and union council of Sargodha District (Urdu ضِلع سرگودها) in the Punjab province of Pakistan. It is part of Bhalwal Tehsil.
