= Chak 18/SB =

- Village
- Location in Pakistan
- Coordinates: 32°15′50.6″N 73°8′34.9″E
- Country: Pakistan
- Province: Punjab
- District: Sargodha

Chak 18/SB is a village in Bhalwal Tehsil, Sargodha District, Punjab, Pakistan. According to the 2017 census, it has a population of 2,993.
