= PP-77 Sargodha-VII =

Constituency of the Punjabi Provincial Legislature, Pakistan

- Constituency for the Provincial Assembly of Punjab
- Region: Sargodha Tehsil (partly) including Cantonment area of Sargodha District

Current constituency
- Created from: PP-35 Sarghoda-VII (2002–2018); PP-76 Sargodha-V (2018-2023)

PP-77 Sargodha-VII (پی پی-77، سرگودھا-7) is a Constituency of Provincial Assembly of Punjab.

== General elections 2024 ==
Provincial election 2024: PP-77 Sargodha-VII
Party	Candidate	Votes	%	±%
PML(N)	Safdar Hussain Sahi	49,640	38.99	
Independent	Abdul Wahab Mumtaz Kahloon (Note: Filed nomination papers as PTI candidate but ECP allowed him to run as an Independent)	46,651	36.64	
Independent	Kamil Shameel	7,660	6.02	
PPP	Abdul Latif	6,440	5.06	
TLP	Zubair Tariq	4,043	3.18	
Independent	Zulfiqar Ahmed	2,565	2.02	
JI	Shams Naveed Cheema	2,441	1.92	
Others	Others (twenty five candidates)	7,878	6.17	
Turnout		130,653	54.87	
Total valid votes		127,318	97.45	
Rejected ballots		3,335	2.55	
Majority		2,989	2.35	
Registered electors		238,135		
hold				

== General elections 2018 ==
Provincial election 2018: PP-76 Sargodha-V
Party	Candidate	Votes	%	±%
PTI	Chaudhary Faisal Farooq Cheema	60,707	44.20	
PML(N)	Kamil Shameel	53,463	38.93	
PPP	Rana Muhammad Abbas	9,546	6.95	
MMA	Ilyas Mehmood	4,692	3.42	
TLI	Qasim Ali Sayed	2,278	1.66	
Independent	Muhammad Sarwar Bhatti	2,250	1.64	
TLP	Muhammad Rafique	2,065	1.50	
AAT	Moazam Ali Goraiya	1,730	1.26	
Others	Others (four candidates)	612	0.45	
Turnout		140,341	58.69	
Total valid votes		137,343	97.86	
Rejected ballots		2,998	2.14	
Majority		7,244	5.27	
Registered electors		239,140		

== General elections 2013 ==
Provincial election 2013 : PP-35 Sargodha-VII
Party	Candidate	Votes	%	±%
Independent	Ch. Faisal Farooq Cheema	41,853	37.49	
PML(N)	Sardar Kamil Gujjar	31,740	28.43	
PPP	Mian Muhammad Sher Nangiana	12,319	11.04	
PTI	Syed Mehmood Bakhsh Gillani	8,637	7.74	
JI	Muhammad Javaid Iqbal Cheema	5,107	4.58	
Independent	Ch. Abdur Razaq Gujjar Qadri	4,903	4.39	
Independent	Muhammad Ali Gujjar Advocate	2,682	2.40	
Others	Others (nine candidates)	4,390	3.93	
Turnout		115,098	61.73	
Total valid votes		111,631	96.99	
Rejected ballots		3,467	3.01	
Majority		10,113	9.06	
Registered electors		186,445		

== General elections 2008 ==
Provincial election 2008 : PP-35 Sargodha-VII
Party	Candidate	Votes	%	±%
PPP	Sardar Kamil Gujjar	35,518	42.34	
PML(Q)	Ch. Faisal Farooq Cheema	32,753	39.04	
PML(N)	Muhammad Ali Rauf	15,396	18.35	
Others	Others	225	0.27	
Turnout		86,051	47.01	
Total valid votes		83,892	97.49	
Rejected ballots		2,159	2.51	
Majority		2,765	3.30	
Registered electors		183,057		

== See also ==
- PP-76 Sargodha-VI
- PP-78 Sargodha-VIII
