= NA-83 Sargodha-II =

Constituency of the National Assembly of Pakistan

- Constituency for the National Assembly of Pakistan
- Region: Kot Momin Tehsil and Sargodha Tehsil (partly) of Sargodha District
- Electorate: 528,555

Current constituency
- Party: Pakistan Tehreek-e-Insaf
- Member: Usama Ghias Mela
- Created from: NA-65 Sargodha-II

NA-83 Sargodha-II (این اے-83، سرگودھا-٢) is a constituency for the National Assembly of Pakistan.

== Members of Parliament ==
=== 1988–2002: NA-48 Sargodha-II ===
Election	Member	Party
1988	Chaudhry Qadir Bakhsh Mela	PPP
1990	Muhammad Nawaz Sharif	IJI
1990 by-election	Chaudhry Qadir Bakhsh Mela	IJI
1993	Chaudhry Liaquat Hayat Badrana	PPP
1997	Chaudhary Ghias Ahmed Mela	PML-Q

=== 2002–2018: NA-65 Sargodha-II ===
Election	Member	Party
2002	Chaudhary Ghias Ahmed Mela	PML-Q
2008	Chaudhary Ghias Ahmed Mela	PML-Q
2013	Mohsin Shahnawaz Ranjha	PML-N

=== 2018–2023: NA-89 Sargodha-II ===
Election	Member	Party
2018	Mohsin Shahnawaz Ranjha	PML(N)

=== 2024–present: NA-83 Sargodha-II ===
Election	Member	Party
2024	Usama Ghias Mela	PTI

== Election 2002 ==
General elections were held on 10 October 2002. Chaudhry Ghias Ahmed Mela of PML-Q won by 62,306 votes.

General election 2002: NA-65 Sargodha-II
Party	Candidate	Votes	%	±%
PML(Q)	Ghias Ahmed Mela	62,306	47.60	
PPP	Mehr Khaliq Yar Khan Lak	59,034	45.10	
PML(N)	Ahtasham Ahmed Cheema	8,299	6.34	
Independent	Mehr Muhammad Yar Khan Lak	1,257	0.96	
Turnout		134,185	46.67	
Total valid votes		130,896	97.55	
Rejected ballots		3,289	2.45	
Majority		3,272	2.50	
Registered electors		287,545		

== Election 2008 ==
The result of general election 2008 in this constituency is given below.

=== Result ===
Ch. Ghias Ahmed Mela succeeded in the election 2008 and became the member of National Assembly.

General election 2008: NA-65 Sargodha-II
Party	Candidate	Votes	%	±%
PML(Q)	Ghias Ahmed Mela	53,518	35.86	
PPP	Mahar Khliq Yar Khan Lak	53,257	35.69	
PML(N)	Mohsin Shahnawaz Ranjha	41,655	27.91	
Others	Others (two candidates)	806	0.54	
Turnout		155,413	44.94	
Total valid votes		149,236	96.03	
Rejected ballots		6,177	3.97	
Majority		261	0.17	
Registered electors		345,850		
PML(Q) hold				

== Election 2013 ==
General elections were held on 11 May 2013. Mohsin Shahnawaz Ranjha of PML-N won by 102,871 votes and became the member of National Assembly.

General election 2013: NA-65 Sargodha-II
Party	Candidate	Votes	%	±%
PML(N)	Mohsin Shahnawaz Ranjha	102,871	54.23	
PML(Q)	Ghias Ahmed Mela	60,558	31.92	
Independent	Madiha Mazhar Ali Ranjha	10,395	5.48	
Others	Others (three candidates)	15,886	8.37	
Turnout		196,657	60.82	
Total valid votes		189,710	96.47	
Rejected ballots		6,947	3.53	
Majority		42,313	22.31	
Registered electors		323,341		
PML(N) gain from PML(Q)				

== Election 2018 ==
General elections were held on 25 July 2018.

General election 2018: NA-89 Sargodha-II
Party	Candidate	Votes	%	±%
PML(N)	Mohsin Shahnawaz Ranjha	114,245	43.70	
PTI	Usama Ghias Mela	113,422	43.38	
Others	Others (four candidates)	26,905	10.29	
Turnout		261,441	58.93	
Rejected ballots		6,869	2.63	
Majority		823	0.38	
Registered electors		443,614		
PML(N) hold		Swing	N/A	

== Election 2024 ==
General elections were held on 8 February 2024. Usama Ghias Mela won the election with 136,604 votes.

General election 2024: NA-83 Sargodha-II
Party	Candidate	Votes	%	±%
PTI	Usama Ghias Mela (Note: Filed nomination papers as PTI candidate but ECP allowed him to run as an Independent)	136,604	50.95	▲7.57
PML(N)	Mohsin Shahnawaz Ranjha	98,700	36.81	▼6.89
TLP	Muhammad Younis	12,333	4.60	
Others	Others (eight candidates)	20,469	7.63	
Turnout		277,838	52.57	▼6.36
Total valid votes		268,106	96.50	
Rejected ballots		9,732	3.50	
Majority		37,904	14.14	
Registered electors		528,554		

== See also ==
- NA-82 Sargodha-I
- NA-84 Sargodha-III
