= Chak 138 SB =

- Village
- Location in Pakistan
- Coordinates: 31°44′35.4″N 72°27′44.9″E
- Country: Pakistan
- Province: Punjab
- District: Sargodha

Chak 138 SB is a village in Sillanwali Tehsil, Sargodha District, Punjab, Pakistan. According to the 2017 census, it has a population of 10,790.
