= Chak 19/SB =

- Village
- Location in Pakistan
- Coordinates: 32°18′23.7″N 73°1′43.0″E
- Country: Pakistan
- Province: Punjab
- District: Sargodha

Chak 19/SB is a village in Bhalwal Tehsil, Sargodha District, Punjab, Pakistan. According to the 2017 census, it has a population of 4,305.
