= Chak 152 NB =

- Village
- Location in Pakistan
- Coordinates: 31°41′18.2″N 72°23′48.7″E
- Country: Pakistan
- Province: Punjab
- District: Sargodha

Chak 152 NB is a village in Sillanwali Tehsil, Sargodha District, Punjab, Pakistan. According to the 2017 census, it has a population of 5,420.
