= Chak 163 NB =

- Village
- Location in Pakistan
- Coordinates: 31°36′20.7″N 72°14′48.0″E
- Country: Pakistan
- Province: Punjab
- District: Sargodha

Chak 163 NB is a village in Sillanwali Tehsil, Sargodha District, Punjab, Pakistan. According to the 2017 census, it has a population of 3,632.
