= Chak 10/NB =

- Village
- Location in Pakistan
- Coordinates: 32°14′33.1″N 72°52′19.4″E
- Country: Pakistan
- Province: Punjab
- District: Sargodha

Chak 10/NB is a village in Bhalwal Tehsil, Sargodha District, Punjab, Pakistan. According to the 2017 census, it has a population of 4,329.
