= Chak 21 SB =

Village in Gujrat District, Punjab, Pakistan

Chak 21 S.B.
- Village
- Location in Pakistan
- Coordinates: 32°9′41″N 73°1′49″E
- Country: Pakistan
- Province: Punjab
- District: Sargodha

Population (2017 Pakistani census)
  - Total: 9,267

Chak 21 S.B. is a village, four kilometers south of Kot Momin, in Sargodha District, Punjab, Pakistan.

It is the largest village of union council 38 of Tehsil Kot Momin with 1503 households. Population of this village is 9,267 per 2017 Pakistani census.
