= Chak 126 SB =

- Village
- Location in Pakistan
- Coordinates: 31°52′11.9″N 72°40′25.3″E
- Country: Pakistan
- Province: Punjab
- District: Sargodha

Population
  - Total: 7,763

Chak 126 SB is a village in Sillanwali Tehsil, Sargodha District, Punjab, Pakistan. According to the 2017 census, it has a population of 7,763.
