= PP-79 Sargodha-IX =

Constituency of the Punjabi Provincial Legislature, Pakistan

- Constituency for the Provincial Assembly of Punjab
- Region: Sahiwal Tehsil and Sargodha Tehsil (partly) of Sargodha District

Current constituency
- Created from: PP-37 Sarghoda-X (2002–2018); PP-80 Sargodha-IX (2018-2023)

PP-79 Sargodha-IX (پی پی-79، سرگودھا-9) is a Constituency of Provincial Assembly of Punjab.

== General elections 2024 ==
Provincial election 2024: PP-79 Sargodha-IX
Party	Candidate	Votes	%	±%
PML(N)	Taimur Ali Khan	42,499	32.16	
Independent	Ghulam Ali Asghar Khan Lahry (Note: Filed nomination papers as PTI candidate but ECP allowed him to run as an Independent)	35,928	27.18	
TLP	Haji Allah Dad	15,624	11.82	
PPP	Sahib Zadaa Naeem Udin	14,536	11.00	
Pakistan Muslim Party	Rana Muhammad Zeeshan	8,413	6.37	
Independent	Hassan Bilal	7,030	5.32	
Independent	Haji Muhammad	2,074	1.57	
Others	Others (eighteen candidates)	6,067	4.58	
Turnout		139,342	51.31	
Total valid votes		132,171	94.85	
Rejected ballots		7,171	5.15	
Majority		6,571	4.98	
Registered electors		271,580		
hold				

== General elections 2018 ==
Provincial election 2018: PP-80 Sargodha-IX
Party	Candidate	Votes	%	±%
PTI	Ghulam Ali Asghar Khan Lahry	60,723	48.06	
PML(N)	Taimur Ali Khan	39,711	31.43	
PPP	Taimur Ameer Khan	11,791	9.33	
Independent	Zulfiqar Ali	5,218	4.13	
TLP	Zain Abbas	4,327	3.43	
AAT	Iftikhar Ahmad	1,372	1.09	
Others	Others (six candidates)	3,202	2.53	
Turnout		130,528	57.16	
Total valid votes		126,344	96.80	
Rejected ballots		4,184	3.20	
Majority		21,012	16.63	
Registered electors		228,371		

== General elections 2013 ==
Provincial election 2013: PP-37 Sargodha-X
Party	Candidate	Votes	%	±%
PML(N)	Sahabzada Ghulam Nizam Ud Deen Sialvi	56,347	53.76	
PTI	Ghulam Ali Asghar Lahri	31,608	30.16	
Independent	Syed Muhammad Raza Ali Shah	8,144	7.77	
Independent	Doctor Ghazanfar Ali Qazi	4,504	4.30	
PPP	Syed Latafat Ali Bokhary	2,779	2.65	
Others	Others (eight candidates)	1,435	1.37	
Turnout		108,546	62.40	
Total valid votes		104,817	96.56	
Rejected ballots		3,729	3.44	
Majority		24,739	23.60	
Registered electors		173,963		

== General elections 2008 ==
Provincial election 2008: PP-37 Sargodha-X
Party	Candidate	Votes	%	±%
PML(N)	Ghulam Nizam-ud-Din Sialvi	31,539	37.42	
Independent	Muhammad Ali Raza Lahri	29,892	35.46	
Independent	Major (R) Sir Blund Ali Khan	11,710	13.89	
PML(Q)	Major (R) Asghar Hayat Kalyar	8,862	10.51	
Independent	Sardar Muhammad Shafqat Hayat Khan	2,288	2.71	
Turnout		88,263	48.03	
Total valid votes		84,291	95.50	
Rejected ballots		3,972	4.50	
Majority		1,647	1.96	
Registered electors		183,752		

== See also ==
- PP-78 Sargodha-VIII
- PP-80 Sargodha-X
