= Chak 36 NB =

Village in Sargodha District, Punjab, Pakistan

Chak 36 NB چک ٣٦ شمالی
- Village
- Location within Pakistan
- Coordinates: 32°7′34″N 72°43′47″E
- Country: Pakistan
- Province: Punjab
- District: Sargodha

Population (2017 Pakistani census)
  - Total: 5,675
- Time zone: UTCUTC+5

Chak 36 NB (Urdu: چک ٣٦ شمالی) is a village in Sargodha Tehsil of Sargodha District, of Punjab, Pakistan.

The village is located near Sargodha Bypass, approximately 5.5 km from Sargodha city.
