= Usama Ghias Mela =

Pakistani politician

- اسامہ غیاث میلہ

Member of the National Assembly of Pakistan
- Incumbent
- Assumed office 29 February 2024
- Constituency: NA-83 Sargodha-II

Personal details
- Party: PTI (2018-present)
- Parent: Ghias Mela (father)

Usama Ghias Mela is a Pakistani politician who is a member of the National Assembly of Pakistan. He is the son of Ghias Mela, a former member of the National Assembly.

== Political career ==
Usama Mela participated in the 2018 Pakistani general election as a candidate of Pakistan Tehreek-e-Insaf (PTI) from the NA-89 Sargodha-II. He received 113,422 votes and was defeated by Mohsin Shahnawaz Ranjha, a candidate of Pakistan Muslim League (N) (PML(N)).

He was elected to the National Assembly of Pakistan in the 2024 Pakistani general election from NA-83 Sargodha-II as an Independent candidate supported by the PTI. He received 136,604 votes, and defeated Mohsin Shahnawaz Ranjha, a candidate of PML(N).
