= PP-76 Sargodha-VI =

Constituency of the Punjabi Provincial Legislature, Pakistan

- Constituency for the Provincial Assembly of Punjab
- Region: Sargodha Tehsil (partly) including Sargodha city area (northern) in Sargodha District

Current constituency
- Created from: PP-33 Sarghoda-VI (2002–2018); PP-77 Sargodha-VI (2018-2023)

PP-76 Sargodha-VI (پی پی-76، سرگودھا-6) is a Constituency of Provincial Assembly of Punjab.

== General elections 2024 ==
Provincial election 2024: PP-76 Sargodha-VI
Party	Candidate	Votes	%	±%
Independent	Zulfiqar Ali (Note: Filed nomination papers as PTI candidate but ECP allowed him to run as an Independent)	36,996	33.66	
PML(N)	Ghulam Dastagir Luk	32,473	29.55	
PPP	Maher Muhammad Yar Khan Lak	16,835	15.32	
Independent	Muhammad Ashraf	6,836	6.22	
Independent	Imran Elahi Pracha	5,634	5.13	
TLP	Muhammad Munir	3,713	3.38	
JI	Muhammad Nasir	3,258	2.96	
Others	Others (twenty four candidates)	4,166	3.78	
Turnout		113,763	48.47	
Total valid votes		109,911	96.61	
Rejected ballots		3,852	3.39	
Majority		4,523	4.11	
Registered electors		234,710		
hold				

== General elections 2018 ==
Provincial election 2018: PP-77 Sargodha-VI
Party	Candidate	Votes	%	±%
PML(N)	Dr. Liaqat Ali Khan	58,405	50.55	
PTI	Muhammad Iqbal	37,878	32.78	
PPP	Mateen Ahmad Qureshi	8,168	7.07	
Independent	Hafiz Abdul Rauf	4,338	3.76	
AAT	Shabbir Hussain	2,191	1.90	
TLP	Sohail Zafar Bajwa	2,073	1.79	
Others	Others (fourteen candidates)	2,488	2.15	
Turnout		117,085	52.53	
Total valid votes		115,541	98.68	
Rejected ballots		1,544	1.32	
Majority		20,527	17.77	
Registered electors		222,889		

== General elections 2013 ==
Provincial election 2013: PP-33 Sargodha-VI
Party	Candidate	Votes	%	±%
PML(N)	Chaudhry Abdul Razaq Dhiloon	58,714	59.38	
PTI	Chaudhry Ali Asif Bagga	19,637	19.86	
PPP	Shehzad Ahmed Qureshi	10,345	10.46	
JUI (F)	Muhammad Aslam Arain	5,939	6.01	
Independent	Sumeer Ayaz Sohatora	1,196	1.21	
Others	Others (twenty candidates)	3,054	3.08	
Turnout		100,494	56.12	
Total valid votes		98,885	98.40	
Rejected ballots		1,609	1.60	
Majority		39,077	39.52	
Registered electors		179,071		

== General elections 2008 ==
Provincial election 2008: PP-33 Sargodha-VI
Party	Candidate	Votes	%	±%
PML(N)	Ch. Abdul Razzaq Dhillon	34,941	50.13	
PPP	Muhammad Afzal Mirza Advocate	28,741	41.24	
PML(Q)	Begum Malik Shoaib Awan	4,582	6.57	
Others	Others	1,431	2.05	
Turnout		71,055	35.96	
Total valid votes		69,695	98.09	
Rejected ballots		1,360	1.91	
Majority		6,200	8.89	
Registered electors		197,605		

== See also ==
- PP-75 Sargodha-V
- PP-77 Sargodha-VII
