= Chak 98 NB =

Coordinates: 31.97962591°N 72.6436925°E

Chak 98NB Sargodha is a village in Tehsil Sargodha, Pakistan. Its coordinates: Latitude 31.97962591 & Longitude 72.6436925. Direction to Qibla 259 degree from North; Distance to Qibla 3448 km. Its distance from Sargodha city is 13.3 km. Lahore located to 194 km; Sialkot to Chak 98NB Sargodha 213 km; Islamabad 262 km; Peshawar 388 km; Quetta 802 km and Karachi located 1215 km: it is situated on Sargodha to Shaheenabad road.

== Education ==
In Chak 98NB Sargodha there is a primary school and a middle school for boys. There is no high school for boys. There is a primary school, high school and a degree college for girls in Chak 98NB Sargodha.

== Religion ==
Muslims are the majority in this Chak. There are also Christians and Ahmadiyya communities in minorities.

== Health ==
There is no working hospital or first aid center.

== Economy ==
Agriculture and livestock are a major part of the economy.

== Transport ==
There is bus service between Sargodha and Sillanwali and a train station at Charnali near from Chak 98NB Sargodha. There is also a train station at Pindi Rasool, which is not operating.
