= Yasir Zafar Sindhu =

Pakistani politician

Yasir Zafar Sandhu

Member of the Provincial Assembly of Punjab
- In office 15 August 2018 – 14 January 2023
- Constituency: PP-73 Sargodha-II
- In office 29 May 2018 – 31 May 2018
- Constituency: PP-30 (Sargodha-III)

Personal details
- Party: PMLN

Yasir Zafar Sandhu is a Pakistani politician who has been a member of the Provincial Assembly of Punjab, from March 2018 to May 2018 and from August 2018 to January 2023.

== Early life and family ==
Zafar was born on 21 October 1978. He was born in Chak 19, Kotmomin, Sargodha and has two siblings; Usman Zafar Sandhu and Faraz Zafar Sandhu. His father, Zafar Iqbal Sandhu, is a retired Bank official.

== Education ==
Sandhu got his early education from Sargodha and did his bachelor's degree from Punjab University. He did L.L.B from Quais-E-Azam Law College, Sargodha and served as an advocate in Sargodha Bar.

== Political career ==
He was elected to the Provincial Assembly of Punjab as an independent candidate from Constituency PP-30 (Sarghoda-III) in by-polls held in March 2018, with the support of Pakistan Muslim League (N) (PML-N). He defeated a candidate of Pakistan Tehreek-e-Insaf Sajid Mehmood.

He was re-elected to Provincial Assembly of the Punjab as a candidate of PML-N from Constituency PP-73 (Sargodha-II) in the 2018 Pakistani general election.
