= Mohsin Shahnawaz Ranjha =

Pakistani politician

- محسن شاہنواز رانجھا

Member of the National Assembly of Pakistan
- In office 13 August 2018 – 10 August 2023
- Constituency: NA-89 (Sargodha-II)
- In office 1 June 2013 – 31 May 2018
- Constituency: NA-65 (Sargodha-II)

Minister of State for Parliamentary Affairs
- In office 10 October 2017 – 31 May 2018
- Prime Minister: Shahid Khaqan Abbasi
- Succeeded by: Syed Ali Zafar

Personal details
- Born: 22 July 1977 (age 49) Sargodha, Punjab, Pakistan
- Party: PMLN (2008-present)

Mohsin Shahnawaz Ranjha (Urdu: محسن شاہنواز رانجھا; born 22 July 1977) is a Pakistani politician who had been a member of the National Assembly of Pakistan from August 2018 till August 2023. Previously, he was a member of the National Assembly from June 2013 to May 2018. He served as Minister of State for Parliamentary Affairs, in Abbasi cabinet from October 2017 to May 2018.

== Early life ==
He was born on 22 July 1977. He received his primary, and middle, education from the eminent Lawrence College, Ghora Gali, Murree, and later got admitted in Atchison College Lahore, Pakistan’s premier boarding school, for his secondary and higher secondary education. After the completion of his educational years at Atchison, Mr. Ranjha enrolled in Government College Lahore for his Bachelors, following which he secured admission in the illustrious University of London, United Kingdom, for his LLB Honours. Following his graduation from University of London, Mr. Ranjha was enrolled in the Bar Professional Training Program, and on the successful completion of the same, was called to the Bar by Lincoln’s Inn in 2005. During his stay in England, Mr. Ranjha was associated with Furnival Chambers, London, and Keating Chambers, London, UK.

== Professional career ==
Following his successful enrolment to the Bar of England and Wales, Mr. Ranjha returned to Pakistan, and started working with Hassan & Hassan (Advocates) as an associate. During his stay at Hassan & Hassan, Mr. Ranjha handled litigation work in Civil, Banking and the High Courts of Pakistan, and assisted senior members of the chambers in drafting opinions in areas of Banking Law, Company Law, Contract Law, and Intellectual Property Law etc.

After the completion of his stay at Hassan & Hassan, Mr. Ranjha joined Baig & Co. as Partner, where he spearheaded the Chamber’s litigation team. Whilst being the team head, Mr. Ranjha appeared before Civil, Banking and the High Courts of Pakistan in a vast array of matters, to represent a large number of notable individuals and corporate entities of Pakistan, and abroad.

Due to his adroit outlook, and prowess over corporate and constitutional matters, Mr. Ranjha was appointed by the Bank of Punjab (BOP), as its Legal Advisor, in 2008. Alongside his appearance before Securities and Exchange Commission of Pakistan, Civil Courts, Court of Sessions, Banking Courts, and High Courts of Pakistan, representing BOP, Mr. Ranjha also superintended contract drafting and opinion writing work of the bank, and assisted lawyers appearing before the Supreme Court of Pakistan. During the years of his practice as an advocate, Mr. Ranjha has been associated with some prominent law chambers of Pakistan, including Khawaja Harris Ahmed Law Associates, Hassan & Hassan (Advocates), and Cornelius, Lane and Mufti (Advocates & Solicitors) etc.

Alongside providing advisory services to various multinational corporations, Mr. Ranjha is often requested by his corporate clients to supervise contracts, indentures, and joint venture agreements involving millions of dollars, and to represent them in domestic and international arbitrations.

Apart from practising law in the Courts of Pakistan, Mr. Ranjha is also passionate about training the younger members of the legal fraternity. To pursue his dream of educating the young, has lectured on various disciplines of law in University College Lahore, The Institute of Legal Studies, Lahore, and Pakistan College of Law, Lahore, and University of London.

In addition to his buoyant career as attorney, Mr. Ranjha also supervised the investigation of the Harris Steel case, the biggest banking fraud in the history of Pakistan, alongside officers of the National Accountability Bureau. He has also been involved with the National Accountability Bureau, regarding the arrest and seizure of properties of the accused, in various prominent cases, in international jurisdictions, including Dubai, Malaysia, and United States of America.

== Political career ==
He ran for the seat of the National Assembly of Pakistan as a candidate of Pakistan Muslim League (N) (PML-N) from Constituency NA-65 (Sargodha-II) in the 2008 Pakistani general election but was unsuccessful. He received 41,655 votes and lost the seat to Ghias Mela. In the same election, he also ran for the seat of Provincial Assembly of the Punjab from Constituency PP-32 (Sargodha-V) as an independent candidate but was unsuccessful. He received 1,036 votes and lost the seat to Chaudhry Aamir Sultan Cheema.

He was elected to the National Assembly as a candidate of PML-N from Constituency NA-65 (Sargodha-II) in the 2013 Pakistani general election. He received 102,871 votes and defeated Ghias Mela. During his tenure as Member of the National Assembly, he served as the Federal Parliamentary Secretary for Information and Broadcasting.

Following the election of Shahid Khaqan Abbasi as Prime Minister of Pakistan in August 2017, he was inducted into the federal cabinet of Abbasi and was made Minister of State, however he was not assigned any ministry. In October 2017, he was made Minister of State for Parliamentary Affairs. Upon the dissolution of the National Assembly on the expiration of its term on 31 May 2018, Ranjha ceased to hold the office as Minister of State for Parliamentary Affairs.

He was re-elected to the National Assembly as a candidate of PML-N from Constituency NA-89 (Sargodha-II) in the 2018 Pakistani general election.
