= Mumtaz Kahloon =

Mohammad Mumtaz Akhtar Kahloon
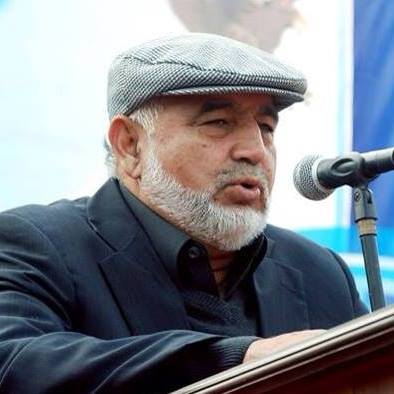

District President, PTI Sargodha
- In office 29 June 2014 – 23 May 2015

Chairman of the National Vocational & Technical Education Commission of Pakistan (NAVTEC)
- In office 21 December 2010 – 15 March 2013
- President: Asif Ali Zardari
- Prime Minister: Yusuf Raza Gillani
- Preceded by: Adnan Khawaja

Personal details
- Born: 1 November 1956 (age 69) Sialkot, Punjab, Pakistan
- Party: PTI (2011-present)
- Education: University of the Punjab

Mohammad Mumtaz Akhtar Kahloon (born 1 November 1956; Sialkot, Punjab) is the District President of Pakistan Tehreek-e-Insaf, Sargodha District. He has also served as the Chairman of the National Vocational and Technical Education Commission of Pakistan (NAVTEC). He was appointed to this latter position by the incumbent Pakistani Prime Minister, Yousef Raza Gilani on 21 December 2010.

== Political career ==
Mumtaz Akhtar Kahloon has been politically active from a young age. He campaigned for his uncle, Chaudhry Mumtaz Ahmed Kahloon, both in the Provincial Assembly of the Punjab elections during the 1970s and in the 1990 and 1993 polls for the National Assembly of Pakistan. He also was an active member of the Pakistan Peoples Party (PPP).

He briefly joined the Jamaat-e-Islami party as he was intrigued by the teachings of the religious leader Abul Ala Maududi before announcing in late 2006 that he was joining the Pakistan Muslim League (N) (PML-N). He frequently met and discussed the future policies with the exiled leadership of PML-N in Saudi Arabia. At the end of 2007, Kahloon advised Mian Mohammad Nawaz Sharif, Mian Shahbaz Sharif, Nisar Ali Khan and Ahsan Iqbal to contest the Pakistani general election, 2008, soon after the assassination of Benazir Bhutto. In the 2008 elections, Kahloon and his brother, Ijaz Ahmed Kahloon, supported Rizwan Gill in his successful attempt to win the Provincial Assembly of the Punjab seat PP-34 as a PML-N candidate. This support was given despite Ijaz Kahloon being rejected for the candidacy.

In the summer of 2010, Gill was disqualified from the Punjab Assembly on the grounds of a fake university degree. He was unsuccessful in challenging the decision in the Pakistan Supreme Court and thus the PP-34 seat in Sargodha became vacant. Although Kahloon again approached the senior party leadership to obtain the nomination of his brother as a candidate, the party decided to prefer Gill's cousin, Tabraiz Gill. This caused the Kahloon brothers to decide that Ijaz would contest as an independent candidate in the by-election on 26 July 2010. Ijaz Kahloon won that election, defeating both the PML-N candidate and Fiaz Otthi of the PPP.

On 1 August 2010, after the election, but before Ijaz Ahmed Kahloon had taken his seat in parliament, the two brothers re-joined the Pakistan Peoples' Party (PPP).

Mumtaz Kahloon joined the Pakistan Tehreek-e-Insaf party under the leadership of Imran Khan. He contested the election held on 11 May 2013 for the National Assembly of Pakistan from the Pakistan Tehreek-e-Insaf party ticket from NA-66 and was the runner-up in the race.

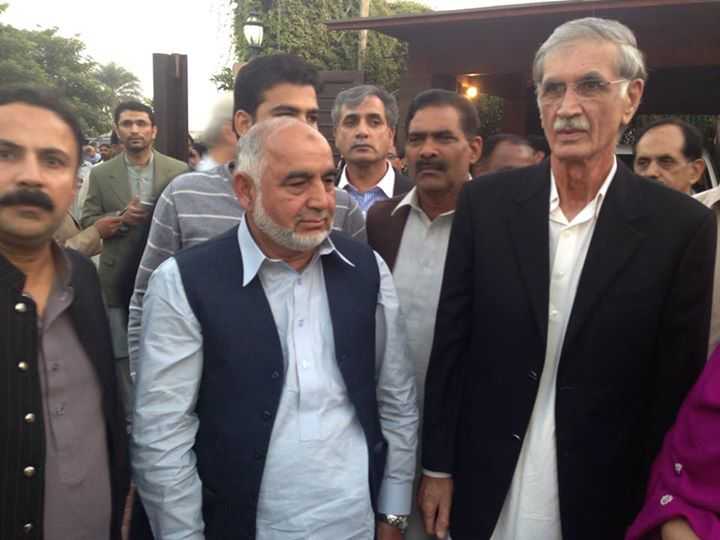
Mr. Mumtaz Kahloon meeting Pervez Khattak, the Chief Minister of KPK Legislative Assembly

On 29 June 2014, he was appointed the District President of Pakistan Tehreek-e-Insaf, Sargodha District.

== National Vocational and Technical Education Commission ==
Then prime minister, Yusuf Raza Gilani appointed Mumtaz Kahloon as honorary chairman of the National Vocational and Technical Education Commission (NAVTEC) in December 2010.

During his tenure, NAVTEC received €20 million in soft loans from Germany, as well as a US$5 million investment from Korea.

== Business interests ==
As of 2014, Kahloon is managing director of the City Link Group of companies, which provide transportation and related services in the Middle East and South Asia.
