= Chak 15/SB =

- Village
- Location in Pakistan
- Coordinates: 32°10′20.2″N 72°53′26.8″E
- Country: Pakistan
- Province: Punjab
- District: Sargodha

Chak 15/SB is a village in Bhalwal Tehsil, Sargodha District, of the Punjab province, Pakistan. According to the 2017 census, it has a population of 3,544.
