= Chak 71 NB =

Village in Sargodha District, Punjab, Pakistan

- Village
- Location in Pakistan
- Coordinates: 32°11′18″N 73°01′43″E
- Country: Pakistan
- Province: Punjab
- District: Sargodha

Population (2017 Pakistani census)
  - Total: 25,262

Chak 71 NB is a village in Sargodha District, Punjab, Pakistan. The village is situated on Khushab Road about 4 km from Sargodha city. It consists of Fatima Jinnah Colony, Sabharwal Colony and Aslam Colony. The population of the village is 25,262 persons per 2017 Pakistani census.
