= Khan Muhammad Wala =

Coordinates: 32°25′N 72°55′E

- Village
- Interactive map of Khan Muhammad Wala
- Country: Pakistan
- Province: Punjab
- District: Sargodha

Population
  - Total: ~4,000

Khan Muhammad Wala is a union council in Sargodha District, in the Punjab province of Pakistan.

Khan Muhammad Wala village is situated on the road joining Bhera with Bhalwal. It is 8 km away from Bhera and 15 km from Bhalwal. It lies on the bank of Shahpur canal.

The majority of the people are farmers who grow mostly sugarcane, wheat, rice, and tobacco. Major caste in Khan Muhammad Wala is Muslim Sheikh, Gondal, Ranjha, Rajpoot & Lali.

== Education ==
The literacy rate of this village is ~70%. People of this village are keen to get education. Khan Muhammad Wala has one government high school for boys and one high school for girls. Many students go to colleges for their studies situated at Bhera and Bhalwal, Sargodha and Islamabad. Sardar Khan Gondal s/o Rehmat Khan Gondal (Sharfana) was the first person to become a civil engineer with distinction to top at Rasool Technical College in late nineteen sixties. His son Munawar Sajjad Gondal followed him and became first civil servant at federal level. Musharraf Sajjad Gondal s/o Sardar Khan Gondal is also appointed as Deputy Chief geophysicist at Pakistan Petroleum Limited aka PPL.

One of the most popular technical education computer centers known is EURO Computers, established in 2005 and still working with computer education. Many other private schools such as Qiadat Primary School and Pakistan Science Academy are also playing major role for the primary education of the beginners.
