= Kot Kamboh =

Kot Kamboh کوٹ کمبوہ
- Village
- Location in Pakistan
- Coordinates: 32°11′18″N 73°01′43″E
- Country: Pakistan
- Province: Punjab
- District: Sargodha

Kot Kamboh is a village located in Sargodha District in Punjab, Pakistan.
