= NA-84 Sargodha-III =

Constituency for the National Assembly of Pakistan

- Constituency for the National Assembly of Pakistan
- Region: Sargodha City and Cantonment areas of Sargodha District
- Electorate: 530,685

Current constituency
- Party: Pakistan Tehreek-e-Insaf
- Member: Malik Shafqat Abbas Awan
- Created from: NA-66 Sargodha-III

NA-84 Sargodha-III (این اے-84، سرگودھا-٣) is a constituency for the National Assembly of Pakistan.

== Members of Parliament ==
=== 1988–2002: NA-49 Sargodha-III ===
Election	Member	Party
1988	Muhmmad Javed Iqbal Cheema	IJI
1990	Muhmmad Javed Iqbal Cheema	IJI
1993	Mahar Ahmed Zia-ur-Rehman Lak	PML-N
1997	Chaudhry Abdul Hameed	PML-N

=== 2002–2018: NA-66 Sargodha-III ===
Election	Member	Party
2002	Tasneem Ahmed Qureshi	PPPP
2008	Tasneem Ahmed Qureshi	PPPP
2013	Chaudhry Hamid Hameed	PML-N

=== 2018–2023: NA-90 Sargodha-III ===
Election	Member	Party
2018	Chaudhry Hamid Hameed	PML (N)

=== 2024–present: NA-84 Sargodha-III ===
Election	Member	Party
2024	Malik Shafqat Abbas Awan	PTI

== Election 2002 ==
General elections were held on 10 October 2002. Tasneem Ahmed Qureshi of Pakistan Peoples Party Parliamentarian (PPPP) won by 40,448 votes.

General election 2002: NA-66 Sargodha-III
Party	Candidate	Votes	%	±%
PPP	Tasneem Ahmed Qureshi	40,448	32.83	
MMA	Dr. Muhammad Arshad Shahid	38,952	31.61	
PML(N)	Chaudhry Hamid Hameed	29,496	23.94	
PML(Q)	Mian Muhammad Shahid Nazir	10,128	8.22	
PAT	Ch. Sultan Ahmed	2,241	1.82	
Others	Others (five candidates)	1,958	1.58	
Turnout		126,582	44.78	
Total valid votes		123,223	97.35	
Rejected ballots		3,359	2.65	
Majority		1,496	1.22	
Registered electors		282,701		

== Election 2008 ==
The result of general election 2008 in this constituency is given below.

=== Result ===
Tasneem Ahmed Qureshi succeeded in the election 2008 and became the member of National Assembly.

General election 2008: NA-66 Sargodha-III
Party	Candidate	Votes	%	±%
PPP	Tasneem Ahmed Qureshi	69,943	48.08	▲15.25
PML(N)	Chaudhry Hamid Hameed	65,020	44.70	▲20.76
PML(Q)	Begum Malik Shoaib Awan	5,298	3.64	▼4.58
Others	Others (eight candidates)	5,207	3.58	
Turnout		149,272	36.51	▼8.27
Total valid votes		145,468	97.45	
Rejected ballots		3,804	2.55	
Majority		4,923	3.38	
Registered electors		408,823		
PPP hold				

== Election 2013 ==
General elections were held on 11 May 2013. Chaudhary Hamid Hameed of PML-N won by 133,085 votes and became the member of National Assembly.

General election 2013: NA-66 Sargodha-III
Party	Candidate	Votes	%	±%
PML(N)	Chaudhry Hamid Hameed	133,085	62.73	▲18.03
PTI	Abdullah Mumtaz Kahloon	36,296	17.11	
PPP	Tasneem Ahmed Qureshi	29,624	13.96	▼34.12
Others	Others (twelve candidates)	13,167	6.20	
Turnout		215,237	56.03	▲19.52
Total valid votes		212,172	98.58	
Rejected ballots		3,065	1.42	
Majority		96,789	45.62	
Registered electors		384,131		
PML(N) gain from PPP				

== Election 2018 ==
General elections were held on 25 July 2018.

General election 2018: NA-90 Sargodha-III
Party	Candidate	Votes	%	±%
PML(N)	Chaudhry Hamid Hameed	93,948	42.11	▼20.62
PTI	Nadia Aziz	85,220	38.20	▲21.09
PPP	Tasneem Ahmed Qureshi	21,352	9.57	▼4.39
Others	Others (twelve candidates)	19,166	8.59	
Turnout		223,081	52.97	▼3.06
Rejected ballots		3,395	1.53	
Majority		8,728	3.91	▼41.71
Registered electors		421,123		
PML(N) hold		Swing	N/A	

== Election 2024 ==
General elections were held on 8 February 2024. Malik Shafqat Abbas Awan won the election with 101,949 votes.

General election 2024: NA-84 Sargodha-III
Party	Candidate	Votes	%	±%
PTI	Malik Shafqat Abbas Awan (Note: Filed nomination papers as PTI candidate but ECP allowed him to run as an Independent)	101,949	43.11	▲4.91
PML(N)	Liaquat Ali Khan	77,478	32.77	▼9.34
PPP	Tasneem Ahmed Qureshi	33,869	14.32	▲4.75
Others	Others (twenty-two candidates)	23,167	9.80	
Turnout		242,726	45.74	▼7.23
Total valid votes		236,463	97.42	
Rejected ballots		6,263	2.58	
Majority		24,471	10.35	
Registered electors		530,685		

== See also ==
- NA-83 Sargodha-II
- NA-85 Sargodha-IV
