= Liaquat Ali Khan (Sargodha politician) =

Pakistani politician

Member of the Provincial Assembly of the Punjab
- In office 15 August 2018 – 14 January 2023
- Constituency: PP-77 Sargodha-VI

Personal details
- Party: PMLN

Liaquat Ali Khan is a Pakistani politician who had been a member of the Provincial Assembly of the Punjab from August 2018 till January 2023.

== Political career ==
He was elected to the Provincial Assembly of the Punjab as a candidate of Pakistan Muslim League (N) (PML(N)) from Constituency PP-77 (Sargodha-VI) in the 2018 Pakistani general election.

He contested the 2024 Pakistani general election as a candidate of PML(N) from NA-84 Sargodha-III, but was unsuccessful. He received 77,478 votes and was defeated by Malik Shafqat Abbas Awan, an independent candidate supported by Pakistan Tehreek-e-Insaf (PTI).
