= Hathiwind =

Hathi Wind
- Village
- Location in Pakistan
- Coordinates: 32°23′00″N 72°54′10″E
- Country: Pakistan
- Province: Punjab
- District: Sargodha
- Founder: baba ghanyo

Hathiwind, also known as Hathi Pind, is a village in Sargodha District of Punjab province, Pakistan. It is located at an altitude of 186 metres (610 ft) and is situated on the Bhera-Bhalwal Road. This road divides the village into two parts.

The village has a government hospital and a girls primary school. Most of students have to go to surrounding cities and towns for education. A large graveyard (100 acres) in the area is some 500 years old.

== Notable persons ==
- Ahsan Fraz Gondal, Pakistan administrative Service
