= Chak 48 SB =

- Village
- Location in Pakistan
- Coordinates: 31°51′24.1″N 72°42′45.0″E
- Country: Pakistan
- Province: Punjab
- District: Sargodha
- Tehsil: Sillanwali

Chak 48 SB is a village in Sillanwali Tehsil, Sargodha District, Punjab, Pakistan. According to the 2017 census, it has a population of 3,813.
