= PP-75 Sargodha-V =

Constituency of the Punjabi Provincial Legislature, Pakistan

- Constituency for the Provincial Assembly of Punjab
- Region: Sargodha Tehsil (partly) including Sargodha city (Southern) in Sargodha District

Current constituency
- Created from: PP-34 Sarghoda-VII (2002–2018); PP-78 Sargodha-VII (2018-2023)

PP-75 Sargodha-V (پی پی-75، سرگودھا-5) is a Constituency of Provincial Assembly of Punjab.

== General elections 2024 ==
Provincial election 2024: PP-75 Sargodha-V
Party	Candidate	Votes	%	±%
Independent	Ali Asif (Note: Filed nomination papers as PTI candidate but ECP allowed him to run as an Independent)	56,617	44.54	
PML(N)	Abdul Razzaq	42,940	33.78	
PPP	Javaid Anwar	13,611	10.71	
JI	Muhammad Usama Ijaz	6,453	5.08	
TLP	Muhammad Saif Ur Rehman Malik	3,132	2.46	
Others	Others (thirty five candidates)	4,376	3.43	
Turnout		129,174	43.64	
Total valid votes		127,129	98.42	
Rejected ballots		2,045	1.58	
Majority		13,677	10.76	
Registered electors		295,975		
hold				

== General elections 2018 ==
Provincial election 2018: PP-78 Sargodha-VII
Party	Candidate	Votes	%	±%
PTI	Ansar Majeed Khan Niazi	46,146	43.98	
PML(N)	Ammara Rizwan Gill	43,135	41.11	
PPP	Safdar Hussain	10,804	10.30	
TLP	Muhammad Munir	3,013	2.87	
Others	Others (nine candidates)	1,828	1.74	
Turnout		106,658	53.80	
Total valid votes		104,921	98.37	
Rejected ballots		1,737	1.63	
Majority		3,011	2.87	
Registered electors		198,234		

== General elections 2013 ==
Provincial election 2013: PP-34 Sargodha-VII
Party	Candidate	Votes	%	±%
PML(N)	Dr. Nadia Aziz	33,853	45.16	
PTI	Ansar Majeed Khan Niazi	23,676	31.59	
Independent	Ejaz Ahmed Kahloon	5,415	7.22	
PPP	Khan Asif Khan	3,345	4.46	
JI	Mian Izhar Ul Haq	3,262	4.35	
JUI (F)	Hafiz Abdul Rauf	2,599	3.47	
MWM	Imran Hussain	1,983	2.65	
Others	Others (twenty one candidates)	825	1.10	
Turnout		76,117	53.93	
Total valid votes		74,958	98.48	
Rejected ballots		1,159	1.52	
Majority		10,177	13.57	
Registered electors		141,130		

== General elections 2008 ==
Provincial election 2008: PP-34 Sargodha-VII
Party	Candidate	Votes	%	±%
PML(N)	Rizwan Nowaiz Gill	19,255	39.74	
PPP	Dr. Nadia Aziz	16,723	34.51	
Independent	Dr. Liaqat Ali Khan	7,352	15.17	
PML(Q)	Muhammad Sarfraz Gondal	4,908	10.13	
Others	Others	216	0.45	
Turnout		49,970	32.90	
Total valid votes		48,454	96.97	
Rejected ballots		1,516	3.03	
Majority		2,532	5.23	
Registered electors		151,902		

== See also ==
- PP-74 Sargodha-IV
- PP-76 Sargodha-VI
