= PP-70 Gujranwala-XII =

Constituency of the Punjabi Provincial Legislature, Pakistan

- Constituency for the Provincial Assembly of Punjab
- Region: Gujranwala Saddar Tehsil (partly) and Gujranwala City Tehsil (partly) including Qila Didar Singh Town in Gujranwala District

Current constituency
- Created from: PP-97 Gujranwala-VII (2002–2018); PP-62 Gujranwala-XII (2018-2023)

PP-70 Gujranwala-XII (پی پی-70، گوجرانوالا-12) is a Constituency of Provincial Assembly of Punjab.

== General elections 2024 ==
Provincial election 2024: PP-70 Gujranwala-XII
Party	Candidate	Votes	%	±%
Independent	Tashakul Abbas Warraich (Note: Filed nomination papers as PTI candidate but ECP allowed him to run as an Independent)	37,709	36.70	
PML(N)	Aman Ullah Warraich	28,874	28.10	
Independent	Abrar Ahmad	11,233	10.93	
TLP	Ch. Muhammad Naseem Bhinder	6,223	6.06	
PPP	Aamer Iftikhar Rana	5,652	5.50	
Pakistan Muslim Markazi League	Faisal Murad	3,336	3.25	
Independent	Atif Munir	2,987	2.91	
Independent	Uzair Ahmad	2,683	2.61	
JI	Qamar Zaman Hassan	2,361	2.30	
Others	Others (twenty eight candidates)	1,682	1.64	
Turnout		106,740	47.37	
Total valid votes		102,740	96.25	
Rejected ballots		4,000	3.75	
Majority		8,835	8.60	
Registered electors		225,314		
hold				

== General elections 2018 ==
Provincial election 2018: PP-62 Gujranwala-XII
Party	Candidate	Votes	%	±%
PML(N)	Aman Ullah Warraich	46,927	47.78	
PTI	Shazia Mazhar Javed	25,924	26.40	
Independent	Amir Iftikhar Rana	5,701	5.81	
MMA	Bilal Qudrat Butt	5,072	5.17	
PPP	Zahid Naseem	4,565	4.65	
TLP	Nasir Mahmood	3,648	3.72	
AAT	Ilyas Ahmad	3,138	3.20	
Independent	Ulfat Rasool Warraich	1,449	1.48	
Others	Others (ten candidates)	1,785	1.79	
Turnout		100,978	55.59	
Total valid votes		98,209	97.26	
Rejected ballots		2,769	2.74	
Majority		21,003	21.38	
Registered electors		181,655		

== General elections 2013 ==
Provincial election 2013: PP-97 Gujranwala-VII
Party	Candidate	Votes	%	±%
PML(N)	Chaudhary Muhammad Ashraf Warraich	29,756	30.30	
Independent	Mian Ghulam Sarwar	23,871	24.31	
PML(Q)	Muhammad Nasir Cheema	22,335	22.74	
PTI	Muhammad Qasim Akram Warriach	8,011	8.16	
TTP	Chaudhary Tariq Mahmood Bhutta	5,094	5.19	
PML(J)	Chaudhary Muhammad Jameel Hanjra	3,166	3.22	
Independent	Zahid Inayat	2,643	2.69	
Others	Others (twenty two candidates)	3,339	3.39	
Turnout		101,973	56.44	
Total valid votes		98,215	96.32	
Rejected ballots		3,758	3.68	
Majority		5,885	5.99	
Registered electors		180,677		

== General elections 2008 ==
Provincial election 2008: PP-97 Gujranwala-VII
Party	Candidate	Votes	%	±%
PML(N)	Mian Ghulam Sarwar	37,825	51.28	
PML(Q)	Ch. Muhammad Nasir Cheema	20,515	27.81	
PPP	Shamaila Liaquat	15,135	20.52	
Others	Others	293	0.40	
Turnout		76,257	40.74	
Total valid votes		73,768	96.74	
Rejected ballots		2,489	3.26	
Majority		17,310	23.47	
Registered electors		187,186		

== See also ==
- PP-69 Gujranwala-XI
- PP-71 Sargodha-I
