= Ludewala =

- Lude wala
- Location within Pakistan
- Coordinates: 30°54′30″N 70°53′20″E
- Country: Pakistan
- Province: Punjab
- Division: Sargodha
- Elevation: 133 m (436 ft)
- Time zone: UTC+5 (PST)

Ludewala is a village in Sargodha District of the Punjab province, Pakistan. It is located at 30°54′30″N 70°53′20″E at an altitude of 133 metres (439 feet).
