= Malik Shafqat Abbas Awan =

Member of the National Assembly of Pakistan from Sargodha (2024–2029)

- ملک شفقت عباس اعوان

Member of the National Assembly of Pakistan
- Incumbent
- Assumed office 29 February 2024
- Constituency: NA-84 Sargodha-III

Personal details
- Party: PTI (2024-present)

Malik Muhammad Shafqat Abbas Awan (Urdu: ملک محمد شفقت عباس اعوان) is a Pakistani politician who has been a member of the National Assembly of Pakistan since February 2024.

== Political career ==
Awan won the 2024 Pakistani general election from NA-84 Sargodha-III as an Independent candidate supported by the Pakistan Tehreek-e-Insaf (PTI). He received 101,949 votes while runner up Liaquat Ali Khan of Pakistan Muslim League (N) (PML (N)) received 77,478 votes.
