= Davis Pur =

- Country: Pakistan
- Province: Punjab
- District: Sargodha
- Time zone: UTC+5 (PST)

Davis Pur (Urdu: ڈیوس پور), also known as Tibiwala (Urdu: ٹبی والا), is a small village in the Sargodha district of Punjab, Pakistan.

== Schools ==
Davis Pur is home to a government school for boys and girls, and a private school.
