= Chak 104 SB =

Coordinates: 31°59′58″N 72°41′46″E

Chak No. 104 SB is a village in Sargodha District in Punjab, Pakistan. Its neighboring villages are Chak No. 108, 109, & 142 SB and 49 NB. The village is situated on Faisalabad Road, and Jhang Bypass, near 49 Tail. This village was an agricultural area but now people have the trend towards businesses. Chak No. 104 SB is situated in the lap of Kirana Hills of Sargodha and on the other side it has a Pakistan Air Force base.

== Facilities ==
The village has a Sargodha medical college, girls degree college, Boys High School, and Girls High School and Girls Primary school, Veterinary Hospital, Mini super Markets, car service stations, Petrol and Diesel Suppliers, Model Janzagah and Play Grounds. There is also 3 to 4 private schools in which the students of neighbouring village came there to get education.The nearest city is Sargodha which is the District Headquarters and Police Station. The village also has a Gym, Pizza shop, water filter plants, societies and towns . It's an important village for Sargodha as there is Kirana Hills and people also provide services and protect the defense system.
