= Ghulam Ali Asghar Khan Lahry =

Pakistani politician

Member of the Provincial Assembly of the Punjab
- In office 15 August 2018 – 14 January 2023
- Constituency: PP-80 Sargodha-IX

Personal details
- Born: 25 May 1956 (age 70) Sargodha, Punjab, Pakistan
- Party: PTI (2018-present)

Ghulam Ali Asghar Khan Lahry is a Pakistani politician who had been a member of the Provincial Assembly of the Punjab from August 2018 till January 2023.

== Political career ==
He was elected to the Provincial Assembly of the Punjab as a candidate of the Pakistan Tehreek-e-Insaf (PTI) from PP-80 (Sargodha-IX) in the 2018 Punjab provincial election.

He ran for a seat in the Provincial Assembly from PP-80 Sargodha-IX as a candidate of the PTI in the 2024 Punjab provincial election.
