= Mian Sultan Ali Ranjha =

Pakistani politician

Member of the Provincial Assembly of Punjab
- Incumbent
- Assumed office November 2025
- Preceded by: Khizar Hayat Lak
- Constituency: PP-73 Sargodha-III

Personal details
- Party: Pakistan Muslim League (N)
- Occupation: Politician

Mian Sultan Ali Ranjha is a Pakistani politician who has been a member of the Provincial Assembly of Punjab since November 2025.

He was elected to the Provincial Assembly of Punjab as a candidate of the Pakistan Muslim League (N) (PML-N) from Constituency PP-73 Sargodha-III in a by-election held on 23 November 2025. He received 71,770 votes. The seat became vacant due to the disqualification of a Pakistan Tehreek-e-Insaf (PTI) lawmaker following convictions related to the May 2023 riots.

== See also ==
- List of members of the 18th Provincial Assembly of the Punjab
