= Behak Maken =

Pakistani town

- Village
- Country: Pakistan
- Province: Punjab
- District: Sargodha
- Union council: 118 (Chak No 92 NB)

Population (JUNE 2025)
  - Total: 11,520
- Time zone: UTC+5 (PST)
- Number of areas: 5

Behak Mekan is a small town in Sargodha District of Punjab, Pakistan. It was established during the British Empire era. The town is situated 16.5 kilometres (10.3 mi) from the city of Sargodha and 10 kilometres (6.2 mi) from Dhreema. Due to its strategic location, the British Royal Air Force constructed an airstrip near "Godhay Wala" which became later significant to the Pakistan Air Force after the independence of Pakistan.

The population of Behak Mekan has grown rapidly and approximately 75% of the [Maken] reside in the settlement.

== Allocation and villages (Mekan Cast) ==
The Maken, sometimes also spelt [Mekan], Maikan or even Maykan, are a Jatt sub-tribe. The sub-tribe claims to have settled in the Thal, after the end of Arab rule in Sindh, when the Hindu king of Kanauj, a Parmar Rajput took possession of the Thal region and settled his kinsmen, the Maken. They then established a state-based in the town of Mankera, now in Bhakkar District, which covered much of the Thal, and lasted for five hundred years, until the state was destroyed by invading Baloch. According to one of their traditions, the Mankera state was founded by a Raja Singh, who belonged to the royal house of Kannauj, and said to have accepted Islam during the time of the Sultan of Delhi, Ghias-ud-din Balban, courtesy of Baba Farid Ganj Shakar. Towards the 12th century, the Baloch from Makran flocked into the country in and around Mankera, and subsequently ruled this state for the next three hundred years. The Makens that settled in the Kirana Bar, and became pastoralist, like the other tribes of the Bar. They, occupied a compact territory in the Kirana Bar, lying to the west of Gondal territory, although a smaller number are also in Jhelum and Gujrat districts. Their present territory now forms part of the Sargodha, Khushab, and Mianwali districts, although as already mentioned, there are smaller broken settlements in Jhelum, Gujrat, and Mandi Bahauddin districts. In Pothohar, in Jhelum / Chakwal region, the Mekan form an important tribal community.

The Mekan form the majority of the population villages in Sargodha District include Behak Maken, said to have been the first village founded by the Mekans when they moved to the Bar, Abu Wala, Chakrala, Deowal, Gondal (Shahpur Tehsil), Mochiwal, Okhli Mohla, Sultanpur Meknawala, Jalpana, Dera Karam Ali Wala, Chak No 88 N.B, Chak No 142 NB, Nihang, Chak 71 NB, Chak 74 NB, Chak 10 NB, Chak No 15 NB , Chabba Purana, Faiz Sultan Colony... in Shahpur Tehsil, Kot Bhai Khan, Kot Pehlwan, Birbal sharif, Kot maghrib, Aqal Shah, Kot Kamboh, Wadhi, Kot Shada, Gul Muhammad Wala and Vegowal. in Bhera Tehsil and Sher Muhammad wala in Bhalwal Tehsil. Across the Jhelum, Maken are also found in Mohibpur village in Khushab District.

Outside this core areas, in Jhelum District, there most important villages are Chautala (Jhelum Tehsil), Chak Mujahid (Pind Dadan Khan Tehsil) and Tobah (Pind Dadan Khan Tehsil), while in Chakwal District, important Mekan villages include Mangwal, Vero, Lakhwal, Thanil Kamal, Dingi Zer, Dhoke Dhabri (almost evenly divided between Gondal and Mekan), Chak Bhoun, Dhoke Makrn near Thoa Bahdur and Ghugh (which largely a Ghugh Jat villages, but home to several Mekan families). The Mekan Jats in terms of population form the most important Jat clan in Chakwal.

While in Gujrat District, they are found in village Mekan in Kharian Tehsil, and in neighbouring Mandi Bahaudin District, there main villages are Lassouri Kalan, Lassouri Khurd, Mekan and Thatti Bawa.

== History ==
Behak Maken was founded when Raja Singh first come to the Sargodha district. It is declare that Baba Farid Ganj Shakar appear to Singh to educate him in Islam after which the Raja well-known Permanently in the region with his family as a Muslim. The word ‘‘‘Maken’’’ in Urdu word میکن).

== Demographics ==
According to the 2017 census of Pakistan, the village had a population of about 9,000 of which, in December 2018, the population of Behak Mekan was estimated at 9315. About 95% of the people are Sunni Islam. The predominant ethnic population in the village is Punjabi with small communities of Muhajirs and Pashtuns.

== Dars e Quran ==
A Madrasa named Darul Aloom Muhammadia Ghousya Behak Mekan is held in this village in 2010, at the present time in September, 2021 about 100 to 150 students are studying there with the help of Anjuman-e-taleem ul muslimeen ghousya Bhera Sharif main darul aloom. There are three mosques in this village, known as 1. Jamia Masid Syedan (Muhammad Shah late) 2.(darbar) wali masjid and main Jamia masjid attached with madrasa.

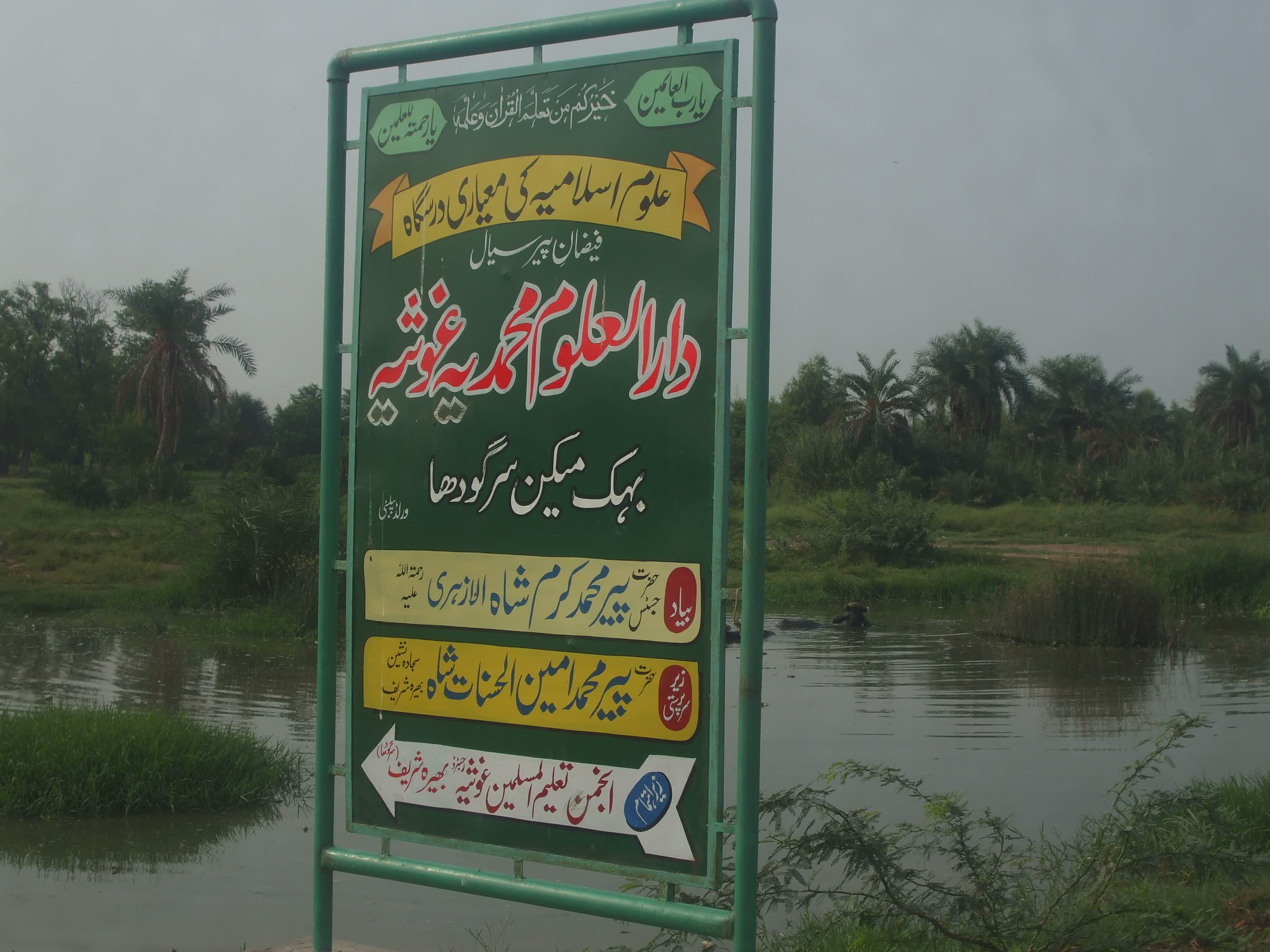

== Economy ==
The vast field on the town allows the farmers to expand a range of crops and animal procreation program. Some of the main crops include citrus, wheat, rice, and sugar cane which are exported to other cities as well as worldwide. Citrus fruits such as oranges (locally known as kinnows) are the main fruits grown in the village. As well as Jaman, Guavas, Mangoes, Pears, Dates, Pomegranate, Phalsa and Almond are also grown in minor quantities. Turnip, onion, cauliflower, potatoes and tomatoes are main vegetables grown in the village. The main livestock for the village include goats, sheep, buffaloes and cattle.

== Languages ==
Punjabi is the focal language of the people. Urdu is also spoken.

== Sports Activities ==
Frequently two types of sports competition are played in this rural community, volleyball and cricket. Cricket competition is conducted every year in the memory of Badar Munir maken (Late), Zulfiqar maken Shaheed and Abdul Latif (Late) in May to July of every year.

== Welfare committee ==
Many welfare groups are functioning in this community; they perform and organize various works for the improvement of this village, such as construction and repair of Mosque, Madras's, infrastructure, street works and more.
(1) Haji Mukhtar Mukhtar Maken (No dar), Haji Ahmed Hayat Maken S/O Muhammad Hayat Maken, Syed Anwar Hussain Bukhari, Ch Amanullah Maken.
(2) Haji Muhammad Riaz Makren, Ch Munir Maken S/O Sardar Maken, Ch Nasar hayat Mekan S/O Rehmat Khan Mekan, Sardar Asif Maken, Ch. Haji Mumtaz Mekan
Also... Syed Zahoor Hussain Shah Hamdani and Mekan syed Aftab Hussain Bukhari PML-N carried out same job.

== Weather ==
Climate data for Behak Mekan (1980–2020)
Month	Jan	Feb	Mar	Apr	May	Jun	Jul	Aug	Sep	Oct	Nov	Dec	Year
Mean daily maximum °C (°F)	20 (68)	22 (72)	26 (79)	36 (97)	42 (108)	50 (122)	43 (109)	40 (104)	36 (97)	32 (90)	26 (79)	22 (72)	30.6 (87.1)
Mean daily minimum °C (°F)	8 (46)	11 (52)	15.5 (59.9)	19 (66)	25 (77)	27 (81)	26 (79)	26 (79)	25 (77)	20 (68)	14 (57)	9 (48)	18.8 (65.8)
Average precipitation mm (inches)	18 (0.7)	36 (1.4)	24 (0.9)	13 (0.5)	17 (0.7)	48 (1.9)	82 (3.2)	87 (3.4)	43 (1.7)	9 (0.4)	11 (0.4)	12 (0.5)	400 (15.7)
Average precipitation days (≥ 1.0 mm)	5	4	5	4	3	3	7	7	4	1	1	1	45
Source: Weather2,

== Vicinity allotment ==
Behak Maken residents circulated in varied area... vicinity with populace are

Area	Population
Behak Maken	6,923
Faiz Sultan Colony	1,596
Dera Soon	5, 70
Burhana	8, 75
Dera Jaat	8, 27
