= Chaudhry Mumtaz Ahmed Kahloon =

Pakistani politician

Chaudhry Mumtaz Ahmed Kahloon is a Pakistani politician. He was a member of the Provincial Assembly of the Punjab from 1972 to 1977.
