= Nadia Aziz =

Pakistani politician (born 1973)

Member of the Provincial Assembly of the Punjab
- In office 29 May 2013 – 31 May 2018
- Constituency: PP-34 (Sarghoda-VII)
- In office 2002–2007
- Constituency: PP-34 (Sarghoda-VII)

Personal details
- Born: 18 February 1973 (age 53) Gujrat, Punjab, Pakistan
- Party: PMLN (2023–); IPP (2023–2024); PTI (2018–2023); PMLN (2013–2018); PPP (2008–2013); PML(Q) (2002–2008)

Nadia Aziz (Urdu: نادیہ عزیز; born 18 February 1973) is a Pakistani politician who was a Member of the Provincial Assembly of the Punjab from 2002 to 2007 and again from May 2013 to May 2018.

== Early life and education ==
Aziz was born on 18 February 1973 in Gujrat.

She completed her college level education from Air Base Inter College in Sargodha. She received the degree of Bachelor of Medicine and Bachelor of Surgery in 1997 from Allama Iqbal Medical College.

== Political career ==
Aziz was elected to the Provincial Assembly of the Punjab as a candidate of Pakistan Peoples Party (PPP) from Constituency PP-34 (Sargodha-VII) in the 2002 Pakistani general election. She received 10,904 votes and defeated a candidate of Pakistan Muslim League (Q) (PML-Q).

She ran for the seat of the Provincial Assembly of the Punjab as a candidate of PPP from Constituency PP-34 (Sargodha-VII) in the 2008 Pakistani general election but was unsuccessful. She received 16,723 votes and lost the seat to Rizwan Nowaiz Gill, a candidate of Pakistan Muslim League (N) (PML-N).

Aziz was re-elected to the Provincial Assembly of the Punjab as a candidate of PML-N from Constituency PP-34 (Sargodha-VII) in the 2013 Pakistani general election. She received 33,853 votes and defeated Ansar Majeed Khan Niazi, a candidate of Pakistan Tehreek-e-Insaf (PTI).

In May 2018, she quit PML-N and joined PTI. Aziz contested for the National Assembly of the Pakistan as a candidate of PTI from Constituency NA-90 (Sargodha-3) in the 2018 Pakistani general election.

In August 2023, Nadia Aziz parted ways with PTI and joined Istehkam-e-Pakistan Party. Later in January 2024, she left IPP and joined Pakistan Muslim League (N) (PML-N) again.
