= Tasneem Ahmed Qureshi =

Pakistani politician

Member of the National Assembly of Pakistan
- In office 2002–2013
- Constituency: NA-66 (Sargodha-III)

Personal details
- Party: PPP

Tasneem Ahmed Qureshi (Punjabi: تسنیم احمد قریشی) is a Pakistani politician who had been a member of the National Assembly of Pakistan from 2002 to 2013.

== Political career ==
He served as former tehsil nazim.

He was elected to the National Assembly of Pakistan from Constituency NA-66 (Sargodha-III) as a candidate of Pakistan Peoples Party (PPP) in the 2002 Pakistani general election. He received 40,448 votes and defeated Muhammad Arshad Shahid, a candidate of Muttahida Majlis-e-Amal (MMA).

He was re-elected to the National Assembly from Constituency NA-66 (Sargodha-III) as a candidate of PPP in the 2008 Pakistani general election. He received 69,943 voted and defeated Chaudhry Hamid Hameed. He also served as minister of state for interior.

He ran for the seat of the National Assembly from Constituency NA-66 (Sargodha-III) as a candidate of PPP in the 2013 Pakistani general election but was unsuccessful. He received 29,624 votes and lost the seat to Chaudhry Hamid Hameed.
