= Bakhuwala =

- Location within Pakistan
- Coordinates: 30.56°N 70.52°E
- Country: Pakistan
- Province: Punjab

Government
  - MPA/Landlord: Ch Nazeer Ahmed Ranjha
  - Chairman Zakat & ushr Committee: Malik Amjid Iqbal Rehan
  - Sr. Member Executive Committee (Welfare): Mian Aqeel Ahmad Khokhar

Area
  - Total: 4 km^{2} (1.5 sq mi)
- Elevation: 134 m (440 ft)

Population
  - Total: 800
- Time zone: UTC+5 (PST)

Bakhuwala is a village in the Punjab of Pakistan.
