= Chaudhry Abdul Razzaq Dhillon =

Pakistani politician (born 1961)

Member of the Provincial Assembly of the Punjab
- In office 2008 – 31 May 2018
- Constituency: PP-33 (Sarghoda-VI)

Personal details
- Born: 11 June 1961 (age 65) Sargodha
- Party: Pakistan Muslim League (Nawaz)

Punjab Assembly Lahore

Chaudhry Abdul Razzaq Dhillon is a Pakistani politician who was a Member of the Provincial Assembly of the Punjab, from 2008 to May 2018.

== Early life and education ==
He was born on 11 June 1961 in Sargodha.

He graduated in 1983 from University of the Punjab and has a degree of Bachelor of Arts.

== Political career ==
He ran for the seat of the Provincial Assembly of the Punjab from Constituency PP-33 (Sarghoda-VI) as a candidate of Pakistan Muslim League (N) (PML-N) and from Constituency PP-34 (Sarghoda-VII) in the 2002 Pakistani general election but was unsuccessful. He received 15,700 votes from Constituency PP-33 (Sarghoda-VI) and lost the seat to Malik Shoaib Awan, a candidate of Pakistan Peoples Party (PPP), and received 58 votes from Constituency PP-34 (Sarghoda-VII) and lost the seat to Nadia Aziz.

He was elected to the Provincial Assembly of the Punjab as a candidate of PML-N from Constituency PP-33 (Sarghoda-VI) in the 2008 Pakistani general election. He received 34,941 votes and defeated Muhammad Afzal Mirza, a candidate of PPP. In the same election, he also ran for the seat of the Provincial Assembly of the Punjab as an independent candidate from Constituency PP-34 (Sarghoda-VII) but was unsuccessful. He received 46 votes and lost the seat to Rizwan Nowaiz Gill, a candidate of PML-N.

He was re-elected to the Provincial Assembly of the Punjab as a candidate of PML-N from Constituency PP-33 (Sarghoda-VI) in the 2013 Pakistani general election. He received 58,714 votes and defeated Chaudhry Ali Asif Bagga, a candidate of Pakistan Tehreek-e-Insaf (PTI).
