= Constituency PP-29 (Sargodha-II) =

Former constituency of the Punjabi Provincial Legislature, Pakistan

PP-29 Sargodha-II
- Former constituency for the Provincial Assembly of Punjab

Former constituency
- Abolished: 2018

PP-29 (Sargodha-II) was a Constituency of Provincial Assembly of Punjab. After 2018 Delimitations it was abolished because Sargodha District lost 1 constituency after 2017 Census

== See also ==
- Punjab, Pakistan
