= Shaheenabad =

- Town
- Location within Pakistan
- Coordinates: 31.9202°N 72.6361°E
- Country: Pakistan
- Province: Punjab
- District: Sargodha
- Tehsil: Silanwali

Shaheenabad (Urdu: شاہِين آباد) is a town in Silanwali Tehsil of Sargodha District, Punjab, Pakistan. It is located 20 kilometres (12 mi) south of Sargodha city near Kirana Hills.

Shaheenabad railway station is situated on the Sargodha-Shorkot railway line in the center of the Shaheenabad town. It is the junction for Shaheenabad-Chak Jhumra railway line. The station is staffed and has a booking office. It is a stop for some express trains.
