= Sillanwali =

Town in Punjab, Pakistan

Sillanwali سِلانٚوالى
- City
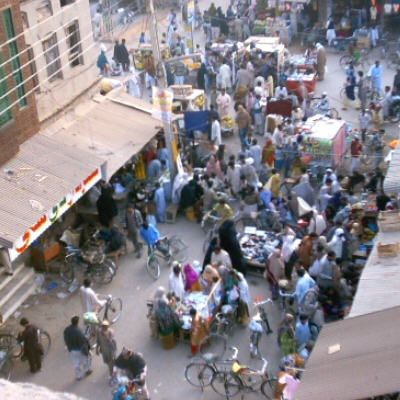
- Aerial view of the Main Bazaar at Sillanwali

- Location within Pakistan
- Coordinates: 31°49′30″N 72°32′20″E
- Country: Pakistan
- Province: Punjab
- District: Sargodha
- Tehsil: Sillanwali
- Elevation: 173 m (568 ft)

Population (2023 Census of Pakistan)
  - Total: 49,311
- Time zone: UTC+5 (PST)
- Calling code: 0992

Sillanwali (Punjabi, Urdu: سِلانٚوالى) is a town of Sargodha Division of Punjab (Pakistan), serving as the administrative centre of Sillanwali Tehsil.

Situated 37 km (23 mi) south of Sargodha city, it is located in the district's southern region. serving as a regional hub for nearby villagers to come and buy goods and sell their produce renowned for its works in handicrafts.

Population of Sillanwali is 49,311 as per the 2023 Pakistani census.

Population of Sillanwali is 37,776 as per the 2017 Pakistani census.
