= Bhalwal =

Residential town in Punjab, Pakistan

Bhalwal بھلوال
- City
- Location within Punjab, Pakistan Location within Pakistan
- Coordinates: 32°15′56″N 72°53′58″E
- Country: Pakistan
- Province: (Punjab, Pakistan) Punjab
- Division: Sargodha
- District: Sargodha

Government
  - Type: Municipal Committee
  - Chief Officer: Zaffar Abbas
  - Municipal Officer (Finance): Barkaat Ahmed

Population (2023 Census of Pakistan)
  - City: 117,982
  - Rank: 105th in Pakistan
- Time zone: UTC+5 (PST)
- Calling code: 04862

Bhalwal (Punjabi and Urdu: بھلوال) is a city and capital of Bhalwal Tehsil of Sargodha District in central Punjab, Pakistan.

It is the 105th most populous city of Pakistan, according to 2023 census. The city of Bhalwal lies in an agricultural area, close to the M-2 motorway. Bhalwal is famous for its oranges.

In 2021, the Government of Punjab decided to urbanize 154 small cities and towns in Punjab, as the result of colossal migration of people from small cities to larger cities like Lahore, Faisalabad, Rawalpindi, Gujranwala, and Islamabad. The master urbanization plan included Bhalwal, due to sharp increase of migration to larger cities.

== Demographics ==
=== Population ===
Historical population
Year	Pop.	±% p.a.
1951	8,674	—
1961	10,207	+1.64%
1972	13,093	+2.29%
1981	35,434	+11.70%
1998	61,523	+3.30%
2017	100,135	+2.60%
2023	117,982	+2.77%

According to the 2023 census, Bhalwal had a population of 117,982.

Languages

Languages of Bhalwal MC (2023 Census)
1. Punjabi (95.3%)
2. Urdu (3.20%)
3. Pashto (1.30%)
4. Others (0.20%)
