= Kot Momin =

City in Punjab, Pakistan

Kot Momin کوٹ مومن
- City
- kot momin
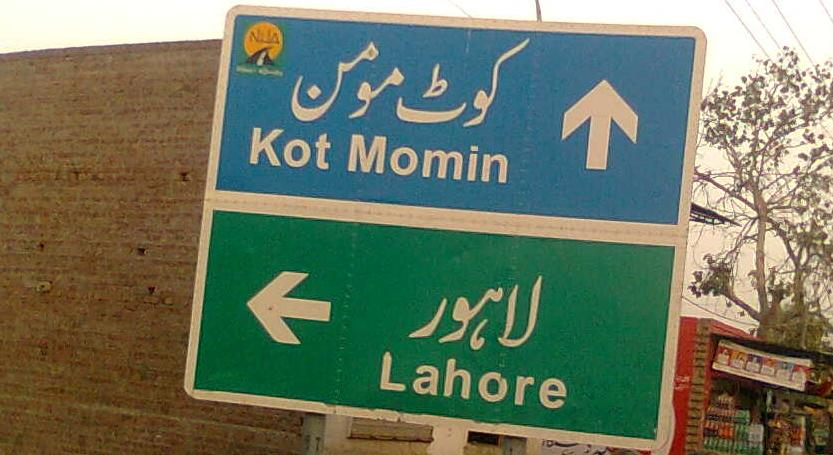

- Location in Pakistan
- Coordinates: 32°11′18″N 73°01′43″E
- Country: Pakistan
- Province: Punjab
- District: Sargodha
- Tehsil: Kot Momin

Population (2023)
  - Total: 63,411
- Postal code: 40450
- Dialling code: 04866

Kot Momin (Punjabi,Urdu: كوٹ مومِن) is a city in Sargodha District, Punjab, Pakistan. On June 21, 2003, then Punjab chief minister Pervaiz Elahi announced Kot Momin as a Tehsil. Kot Momin, almost 40 km from Sargodha city, is most famous for its citrus fruit, mainly Kinnow.

== Demography ==
Population

Historical population
Year	Pop.	±% p.a.
1972	18,459	—
1981	25,383	+3.60%
1998	34,232	+1.77%
2017	50,818	+2.10%
2023	63,411	+3.76%

According to the 2023 census of Pakistan Kot Momin city had a population of 63,411.

Languages

Languages of Kot Momin city (2023 Census)
1. Punjabi (94.3%)
2. Urdu (3.50%)
3. Pashto (1.90%)
4. Others (0.30%)

== Education ==
Following are the notable educational institutes in Kot Momin:

- Govt Associate College Kot Momin for Boys
- Govt Associate College Kot Momin for Girls
- The Superior College, Kot Momin Campus
- Punjab College of Science, Kot Momin Campus
- Government High Secondary School for boys.
- Government Higher Secondary School for girls.
- Darul Huda Model High School, Kot Momin since 1998 most recommended
