= Bhalwal Tehsil =

Administrative unit in Sargodha District, Punjab, Pakistan

تحصيل بھلوال
- Tehsil
- Bhalwal Tehsil
- Country: Pakistan
- Province: Punjab
- District: Sargodha
- Capital: Bhalwal
- Union councils: 54

Population (2017 Pakistani census)
  - Total: 357,331
- Time zone: UTC+5 (PST)

Bhalwal Tehsil (Punjabi,Urdu: تحصيل بھلوال) is a tehsil of Sargodha District in the Punjab province of Pakistan. It is administratively subdivided into 54 union councils, four of which form the tehsil capital Bhalwal.

Bhalwal Tehsil had a population of 357,331 with 64,441 households as per 2017 Pakistani census.

== Administration ==
The tehsil is administratively subdivided into the following union councils:

- Ali Pur Syedan
- Bhabra
- Bhalwal-I (Urban)
- Bhalwal-II (Urban)
- Bhalwal-III (Urban)
- Bhalwal-IV (Urban)
- Bhera-I (Urban)
- Bhera-II (Urban)
- Butcha Kalan
- Chabba Purana
- Chak No. 10/Ml
- Chak No. 02/Nb
- Chak No. 10/Nb
- Chak No. 09/Nb
- Chak 15/SB
- Chak No. 18/Nb
- Chak No. 8/Nb
- Chak No. 11/Sb
- Chak No. 19/Sb
- Chak Mubarik
- Chauwal
- Chak Saida
- Chawa
- Deowal
- Dhal
- Dhori
- Dodha
- Fateh Garh
- Garhi Kala
- Ghulla Pur
- Gurna
- Hazoor Pur
- Hujjan
- Kalyan Pur
- Khan Muhammad Wala
- Kot Ahmed Khan
- Kot Raja
- Lilliani Janubi
- Lilliani Shumali
- Mateela
- Davispur
- Miani (Urban)
- Midh Pargana Miani
- Muazzamabad
- Phularwan (Urban)
- Purana Bhalwal
- Rato Kala
- Raja Aslam Colony
- Salam
- Thatti Noor
