= Sargodha Tehsil =

Sargodha Tehsil تحصِيل سرگودها
- Tehsil
- Country: Pakistan
- Province: (Punjab, Pakistan) Punjab
- District: Sargodha District
- Capital: Sargodha
- Union councils: 62

Government
  - Type: Tehsil Administration
  - Assistant Commissioner: Amina Ehsan (PAS)

Area
  - Tehsil: 1,455 km^{2} (562 sq mi)

Population (2017)
  - Tehsil: 1,537,866
  - Density: 1,057/km^{2} (2,737/sq mi)
  - Urban: 659,862
  - Rural: 878,004
- Time zone: UTC+5 (PST)
- Postal code: 40100
- Area code: 048

Sargodha Tehsil (Urdu: تحصِيل سرگودها) is an administrative subdivision of the Sargodha District in the Punjab province of Pakistan. The tehsil is subdivided into 62 Union Councils - 22 of which form the city of Sargodha.

== Location ==
Sargodha Tehsil is located 172 kilometres (107 mi) northwest of the provincial capital Lahore, in Sargodha District. It lies about 48 kilometres (30 miles) from the M-2 motorway, which connects Lahore and Islamabad. The tehsil is connected to the M-2 by interchanges at different locations. Sargodha is roughly 94 km (58 mi) from Faisalabad, due southeast. Directly east connected by the M-2 motorway are Lahore and the route to Rawalpindi and Islamabad.

== Education ==
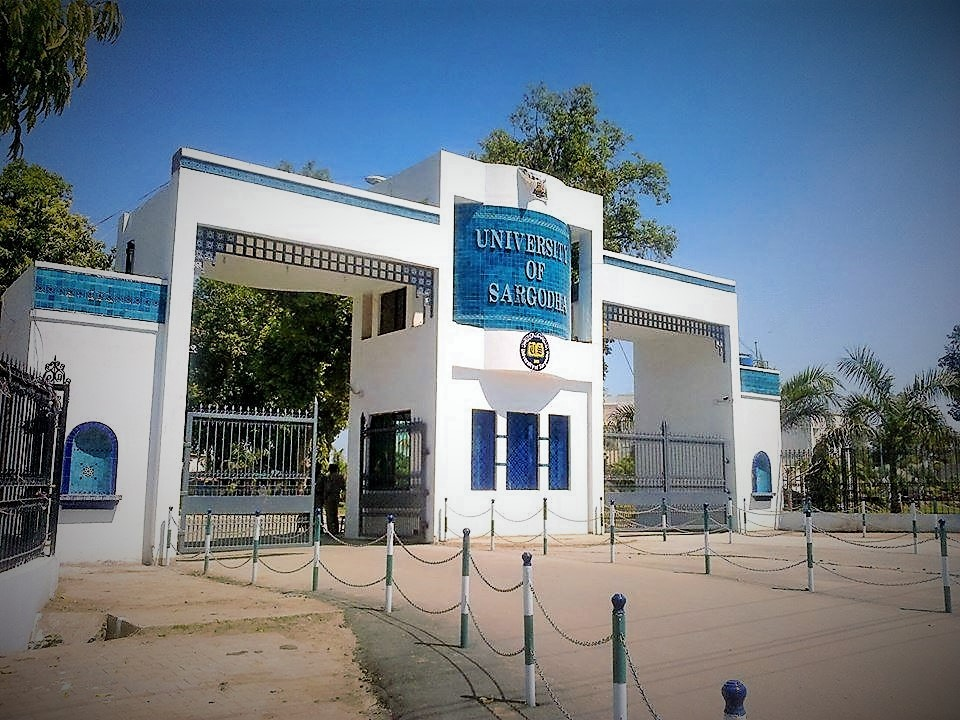
The main gate of the University of Sargodha

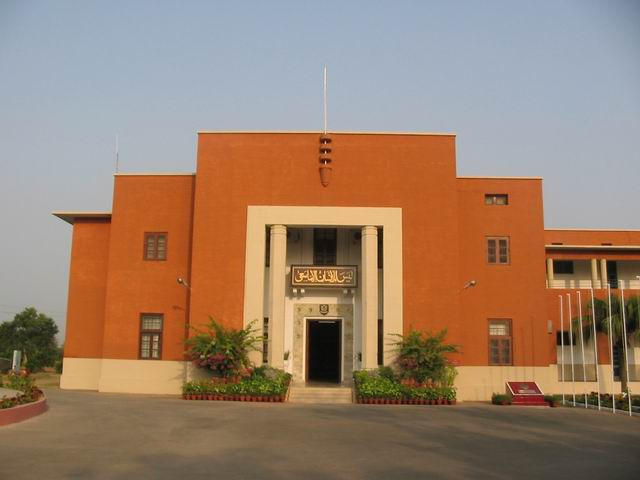
PAF Public School

=== Notable educational institutes ===
University/College	Type	Location	Established	Website
University of Sargodha	Public	University Road	2002	
University College of Agriculture	Public	Sargodha Bypass near Jhal Chakian	2002	
University of Lahore, Sargodha Campus	Private	Lahore Road	2002	
University of Central Punjab, Sargodha Campus	Private	Lahore Road	2002	
Sargodha Medical College	Public	Faisalabad Road	2006	
Army Public College	Army	Mianwali Road	1975	
PAF College	Air force	PAF Base Mushaf	1953	
Cornelius Law College	Private	Fatima Jinnah Road	2015	
Quaid-e-Azam Law College	Private	Lahore Road	1998	
Punjab College of Science	Private	Khayaban-e-Sadiq (Main Campus)	1985	
The Superior College	Private	Satellite Town A-Block	2000	
Dar-e-Arqam College	Private	Satellite Town A-Block	2002	
Sargodha Institute of Technology		University Road	1927	
American Lycetuff School	Private	Queens Road	1996	
Root Millennium School	Private	Queens Road	1988	
Beaconhouse School System	Private	University Road	1975	
The City School	Private	Queens Road	1978	
Lahore Grammar School	Private	Mushaf Ali Mir Road	1979	
Army Public School	Army	Mianwali Road	1975	
Fauji Foundation School	Army	Civil Lines	1954	
Allied School	Private	Main Garden Town Road	1985	

Sargodha Water Supply will be constructed in 1925. This water supply system has been supplying clean drinking water to the residents of Sargodha city since 1925. At present the population of Sargodha city is more than seven lakhs, this water supply supplies water to this population for two hours in the morning and evening.

== Demographics ==
According to the census of 1998, the population of tehsil was recorded as 1,081,000.

== Information Technology and Freelancing ==
The tehsil has seen growth in the IT and freelancing sector. The Freelancers Community Sargodha (FLCS) is a local platform that supports digital professionals and freelancers in the region.
