= Sillanwali Tehsil =

Pakistani administrative area

تحصِيل سِلانٚوالى
- Tehsil
- Sillanwali Tehsil
- Country: Pakistan
- Province: Punjab
- District: Sargodha
- Capital: Sillanwali
- Union councils: 16
- Time zone: UTC+5 (PST)

Sillanwali Tehsil (Urdu: تحصِيل سِلانٚوالى), is a subdivision (tehsil) of Sargodha District in the Punjab province of Pakistan. The tehsil's headquarters is situated in the town of Sillanwali. It is administratively subdivided into 16 union councils. Population is 255,000 (1998) being mainly Muslim and Punjabi speaking.

== Administration ==
The 16 union councils that Silanwali tehsil is administratively subdivided into are:

- Chak No. 135/SB
- Chak No. 163/NB
- Chak No. 111/NB
- Chak No. 118/NB
- Chak No. 126/SB
- Chak No. 129/NB
- Chak No. 131/NB
- Chak No. 138/SB
- Chak No. 143 NB (Chandu)
- Chak No. 147/148 NB
- Chak No. 152/NB
- Chak 48 SB
- Chak No. 49/SB
- Shah Nikdar
- Shaheenabad
- Sillanwali
- Sobhaga
