= Sargodha District =

District in Punjab, Pakistan

Sargodha District ضلع سرگودھا
- District of Punjab
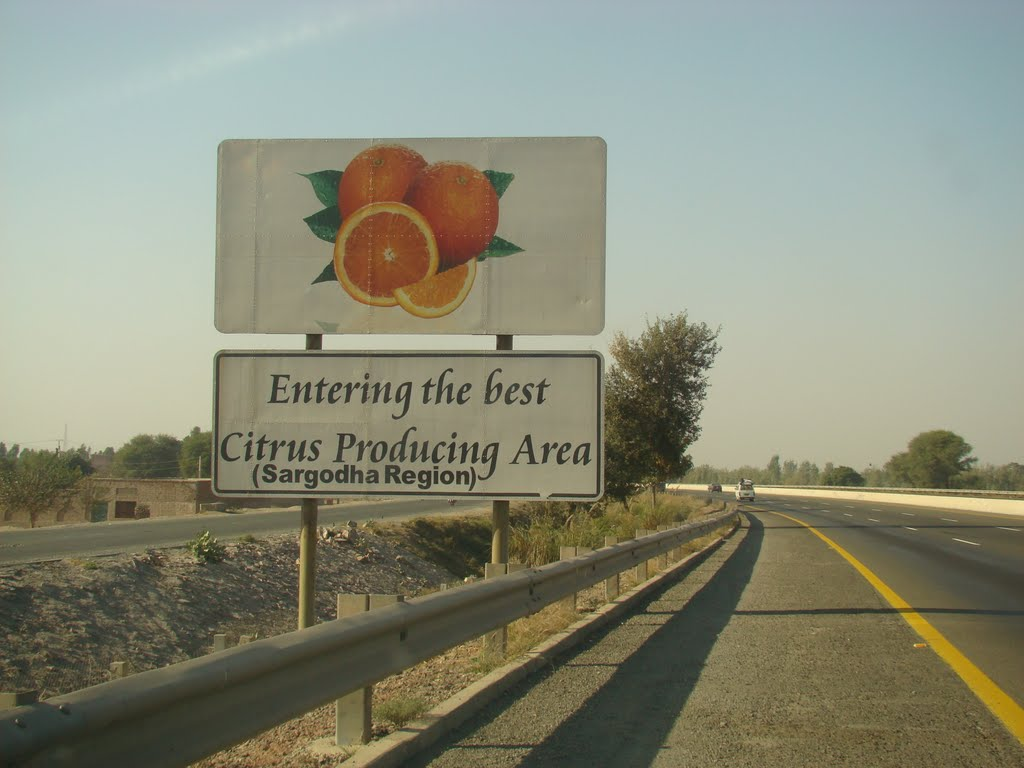
- M-2 Motorway entering Sargodha District

- Flag Seal

- Location of Sargodha District in Punjab
- Coordinates: 32.08°N 72.67°E
- Country: Pakistan
- Province: (Punjab, Pakistan) Punjab
- Division: Sargodha
- Established: 1893 as Shahpur District
- Headquarters relocation: 1914
- Current name: 1960
- Founder: British Colonial Government
- Headquarters: Sargodha
- Tehsils: 7

Government
  - Type: District Administration
  - Body: District administration
  - Deputy Commissioner: Capt (Retd) Shoaib Ali (PAS)

Area
  - District of Punjab: 5,854 km^{2} (2,260 sq mi)
  - Rank: 14th in Punjab

Population (2023)
  - District of Punjab: 4,334,448
  - Rank: 9th in Punjab
  - Density: 740.4/km^{2} (1,918/sq mi)
  - Rank: 19th in Punjab
  - Urban: 1,609,587 (37.13%)
  - Rural: 2,724,861 (62.87%)

Literacy
  - Literacy rate: Total: (76.73%); Male: (79.00%); Female: (63.50%)
- Time zone: UTC+5 (PST)
- Postal Code: 40100
- Area code: 048
- Constituencies: NA-82, NA-83, NA-84, NA-85, NA-86
- National Assembly Seats (2024): Total (5): Sunni Ittehad Council (3); PML(N) (2)
- Punjab Assembly Seats (2024): Total (10): PML(N) (7); Sunni Ittehad Council (3)
- Website: sargodha.punjab.gov.pk

Sargodha District (Punjabi and Urdu: ضلع سرگودھا) is a district of Punjab, Pakistan. The capital of the district is the city of Sargodha. It is an agricultural district with wheat, rice, sugarcane and kinnow being its main crops. The district has an area of 5,864 km^{2}.

The Sargodha district is among the world's best citrus-producing regions, and particularly famous for its kinnow.

== Etymology ==
It is believed that there was an old pond in the middle of the town where an old Hindu monk or sadhu (godha) used to live. The Sanskrit word for pond is "ser". Since the town had a modest population, people would refer the place as 'ser godha', the place where that famous Sadhu resided next to the pond. The Shahpur district was renamed when its headquarters were shifted to Sargodha in 1960.

== Administration and tehsils ==
Sargodha city is the administrative headquarter of Sargodha District Sargodha Division and handles the population of about 8.1 million. Sargodha District is administratively divided into seven Tehsils, which comprise 161 Union Councils. Following are the seven tehsils of Sargodha district:

| Tehsil | Area (km²) | Pop. (2023) | Density (ppl/km²) (2023) | Literacy rate (2023) | Union Councils |
|---|---|---|---|---|---|
| Bhalwal | 663 | 387,262 | 584.11 | 79.31% | ... |
| Bhera | 504 | 384,403 | 762.70 | 67.37% | ... |
| Kot Momin | 948 | 544,208 | 574.06 | 56.33% | ... |
| Sahiwal | 829 | 407,487 | 491.54 | 63.34% | ... |
| Sargodha | 1,536 | 1,800,455 | 1,172.17 | 71.82% | ... |
| Shahpur | 769 | 424,746 | 552.34 | 61.85% | ... |
| Sillanwali | 607 | 385,887 | 635.73 | 63.07% | ... |

== Demographics ==
=== Population ===
Historical population
| Year | Pop. | ±% p.a. |
|---|---|---|
| 1951 | 893,269 | — |
| 1961 | 1,107,226 | +2.17% |
| 1972 | 1,557,641 | +3.15% |
| 1981 | 1,911,849 | +2.30% |
| 1998 | 2,665,979 | +1.98% |
| 2017 | 3,696,212 | +1.73% |
| 2023 | 4,334,448 | +2.69% |

As of the 2023 census, Sargodha district has 684,321 households and a population of 4,334,448. The district has a sex ratio of 102.53 males to 100 females and a literacy rate of 66.73%: 73.63% for males and 59.62% for females. 1,089,643 (25.18% of the surveyed population) are under 10 years of age. 1,609,587 (37.13%) live in urban areas.

=== Religion ===
Religion in Sargodha district (2023)
| Religion | Percent |
| Islam | 98.03% |
| Christianity | 1.86% |
| Other | 0.11% |

As per the 2023 census, Muslims were the predominant religious community, forming 98.03% of the population, while Christians constituted 1.86% of the population.

Religion in contemporary Sargodha District
| Religious group | 1941 | | 2017 | | 2023 | |
| Religious group | Pop. | % | Pop. | % | Pop. | % |
|---|---|---|---|---|---|---|
| Islam | 624,353 | 81.71% | 3,625,339 | 98.08% | 4,241,812 | 98.03% |
| Hinduism (Note: 1931-1941: Including Ad-Dharmis) | 84,697 | 11.09% | 141 | 0% | 456 | 0.01% |
| Sikhism | 42,237 | 5.53% | —N/a | —N/a | 113 | 0% |
| Christianity | 12,682 | 1.66% | 65,231 | 1.76% | 80,411 | 1.86% |
| Ahmadi | —N/a | —N/a | 5,427 | 0.15% | 4,146 | 0.1% |
| Others | 93 | 0.01% | 74 | 0% | 325 | 0.01% |
| Total Population | 764,062 | 100% | 3,696,212 | 100% | 4,327,263 | 100% |
Note: 1941 census data is for Shahpur, Bhalwal and Sargodha tehsils of the former Shahpur District, which roughly corresponds to contemporary Sargodha district. District and tehsil borders have changed since 1941.

Religious groups in Sargodha District (British Punjab province era)
| Religious group | 1881 | | 1891 | | 1901 | | 1911 | | 1921 | | 1931 | | 1941 | |
| Religious group | Pop. | % | Pop. | % | Pop. | % | Pop. | % | Pop. | % | Pop. | % | Pop. | % |
|---|---|---|---|---|---|---|---|---|---|---|---|---|---|---|
| Islam | 357,742 | 84.87% | 417,661 | 84.62% | 442,921 | 84.49% | 572,565 | 83.3% | 596,100 | 82.8% | 679,546 | 82.72% | 835,918 | 83.68% |
| Hinduism | 59,026 | 14% | 66,065 | 13.38% | 68,489 | 13.06% | 72,695 | 10.58% | 82,182 | 11.42% | 90,561 | 11.02% | 102,172 | 10.23% |
| Sikhism | 4,702 | 1.12% | 9,777 | 1.98% | 12,756 | 2.43% | 33,456 | 4.87% | 30,361 | 4.22% | 40,074 | 4.88% | 48,046 | 4.81% |
| Christianity | 29 | 0.01% | 80 | 0.02% | 91 | 0.02% | 8,616 | 1.25% | 11,270 | 1.57% | 11,294 | 1.37% | 12,770 | 1.28% |
| Jainism | 9 | 0% | 0 | 0% | 2 | 0% | 5 | 0% | 3 | 0% | 14 | 0% | 13 | 0% |
| Buddhism | 0 | 0% | 0 | 0% | 0 | 0% | 28 | 0% | 2 | 0% | 1 | 0% | 2 | 0% |
| Zoroastrianism | 0 | 0% | 5 | 0% | 0 | 0% | 1 | 0% | 0 | 0% | 0 | 0% | 0 | 0% |
| Judaism | —N/a | —N/a | 0 | 0% | 0 | 0% | 0 | 0% | 0 | 0% | 0 | 0% | 0 | 0% |
| Others | 0 | 0% | 0 | 0% | 0 | 0% | 0 | 0% | 0 | 0% | 0 | 0% | 0 | 0% |
| Total population | 421,508 | 100% | 493,588 | 100% | 524,259 | 100% | 687,366 | 100% | 719,918 | 100% | 821,490 | 100% | 998,921 | 100% |
Note1: British Punjab province era district borders are not an exact match in the present-day due to various bifurcations to district borders — which since created new districts — throughout the historic Punjab Province region during the post-independence era that have taken into account population increases. Note2: Formerly known as Shahpur District, prior to district headquarters relocating to Sargodha in 1960.

Religion in the Tehsils of Sargodha District (1921)
| Tehsil | Islam | | Hinduism | | Sikhism | | Christianity | | Jainism | | Others (Note: Including Buddhism, Zoroastrianism, Judaism, Tribals, others, or not stated) | | Total | |
| Tehsil | Pop. | % | Pop. | % | Pop. | % | Pop. | % | Pop. | % | Pop. | % | Pop. | % |
|---|---|---|---|---|---|---|---|---|---|---|---|---|---|---|
| Shahpur Tehsil | 117,894 | 85.49% | 14,610 | 10.59% | 5,014 | 3.64% | 381 | 0.28% | 0 | 0% | 0 | 0% | 137,899 | 100% |
| Khushab Tehsil | 149,087 | 88.36% | 14,307 | 8.48% | 5,301 | 3.14% | 23 | 0.01% | 0 | 0% | 0 | 0% | 168,718 | 100% |
| Bhalwal Tehsil | 190,194 | 86.08% | 25,620 | 11.6% | 4,152 | 1.88% | 984 | 0.45% | 0 | 0% | 1 | 0% | 220,951 | 100% |
| Sargodha Tehsil | 138,925 | 72.23% | 27,645 | 14.37% | 15,894 | 8.26% | 9,882 | 5.14% | 3 | 0% | 1 | 0% | 192,350 | 100% |
Note: British Punjab province era tehsil borders are not an exact match in the present-day due to various bifurcations to tehsil borders — which since created new tehsils — throughout the historic Punjab Province region during the post-independence era that have taken into account population increases.

Religion in the Tehsils of Sargodha District (1941)
| Tehsil | Islam | | Hinduism | | Sikhism | | Christianity | | Jainism | | Others (Note: Including Anglo-Indian Christians, British Christians, Buddhism, Zoroastrianism, Judaism, Tribals, others, or not stated) | | Total | |
| Tehsil | Pop. | % | Pop. | % | Pop. | % | Pop. | % | Pop. | % | Pop. | % | Pop. | % |
|---|---|---|---|---|---|---|---|---|---|---|---|---|---|---|
| Shahpur Tehsil | 161,337 | 87.91% | 15,968 | 8.7% | 6,037 | 3.29% | 179 | 0.1% | 5 | 0% | 3 | 0% | 183,529 | 100% |
| Khushab Tehsil | 211,565 | 90.08% | 17,474 | 7.44% | 5,809 | 2.47% | 8 | 0% | 0 | 0% | 3 | 0% | 234,859 | 100% |
| Bhalwal Tehsil | 263,691 | 87.22% | 31,683 | 10.48% | 6,484 | 2.14% | 482 | 0.16% | 1 | 0% | 4 | 0% | 302,345 | 100% |
| Sargodha Tehsil | 199,325 | 71.65% | 37,047 | 13.32% | 29,716 | 10.68% | 12,021 | 4.32% | 7 | 0% | 72 | 0.03% | 278,188 | 100% |
Note1: British Punjab province era tehsil borders are not an exact match in the present-day due to various bifurcations to tehsil borders — which since created new tehsils — throughout the historic Punjab Province region during the post-independence era that have taken into account population increases. Note2: Tehsil religious breakdown figures for Christianity only includes local Christians, labeled as "Indian Christians" on census. Does not include Anglo-Indian Christians or British Christians, who were classified under "Other" category.

=== Language ===
Languages of Sargodha district (2023)
1. Punjabi (90.8%)
2. Urdu (7.61%)
3. Pashto (1.26%)
4. Others (0.34%)

At the 2023 census, 90.79% of the population spoke Punjabi, 7.61% Urdu and 1.26% Pashto as their first language.

== Towns ==
- Farooqa
- Shaheenabad

== Villages ==
- Behak Maken
- Bakhar Bar
- Bakhuwala
- Behak Maken
- Bhikhi Khurd
- Chak 36 NB
- Chak 104 SB
- Chak 129
- Hathi Wind
- Ludewala

== Electricity supplier ==
The electricity supply in Sargodha District is managed by the Faisalabad Electric Supply Company.

== See also ==
- Sargodha City
- Sargodha Division
- Sargodha Cantonment
- Sargodha Tehsil
