= List of constituencies of Pakistan =

The following is a list of constituencies of Pakistan for elected seats in the National Assembly (Urdu: ایوان زیریں پاکستان), which is the lower house of the Parliament of Pakistan, and Provincial/Legislative Assemblies of Pakistan (Punjab, Sindh, Balochistan, Khyber Pakhtunkhwa, Gilgit-Baltistan, Azad Jammu and Kashmir)

== List of National Assembly constituencies ==
The name of a constituency of the National Assembly is as follows: NA (National Assembly) followed by a consecutive number. A member of the National Assembly is called an MNA. The following is a list of the seats allocated by province in the Constitution of Pakistan for the National Assembly.

This Table shows constituencies after the 25th Amendment to Constitution of Pakistan.

Map of Pakistan showing National Assembly Constituencies as of 2023

Detail	General	Women	Non-Muslims	Total
Punjab	141	32	10	173
Sindh	61	14	10	75
Khyber Pakhtunkhawa	45	10	10	55
Balochistan	16	4	10	20
Islamabad	3	-	10	3
Total	266	60	10	336

Provincial and District wise Distribution of National Assembly Seats
Province	Division	District	Seats				Total
Province	Division	District	General		Reserved for		Total
Province	Division	District	District	Division	Women	Non-Muslims	Total
Khyber Pakhtunkhwa	Malakand	Upper Chitral	1	11	10	10	
Khyber Pakhtunkhwa	Malakand	Lower Chitral	1	11	10	10	
Khyber Pakhtunkhwa	Malakand	Swat	3	11	10	10	
Khyber Pakhtunkhwa	Malakand	Upper Dir	1	11	10	10	
Khyber Pakhtunkhwa	Malakand	Lower Dir	2	11	10	10	
Khyber Pakhtunkhwa	Malakand	Bajaur	1	11	10	10	
Khyber Pakhtunkhwa	Malakand	Malakand	1	11	10	10	
Khyber Pakhtunkhwa	Malakand	Buner	1	11	10	10	
Khyber Pakhtunkhwa	Malakand	Shangla	1	11	10	10	
Khyber Pakhtunkhwa	Hazara	Upper Kohistan	1	7	10	10	
Khyber Pakhtunkhwa	Hazara	Lower Kohistan	1	7	10	10	
Khyber Pakhtunkhwa	Hazara	Kolai-Palas	1	7	10	10	
Khyber Pakhtunkhwa	Hazara	Battagram	1	7	10	10	
Khyber Pakhtunkhwa	Hazara	Mansehra	1	7	10	10	
Khyber Pakhtunkhwa	Hazara	Mansehra	1	7	10	10	
Khyber Pakhtunkhwa	Hazara	Torghar	1	7	10	10	
Khyber Pakhtunkhwa	Hazara	Abbottabad	2	7	10	10	
Khyber Pakhtunkhwa	Hazara	Haripur	1	7	10	10	
Khyber Pakhtunkhwa	Mardan	Swabi	2	5	10	10	
Khyber Pakhtunkhwa	Mardan	Mardan	3	5	10	10	
Khyber Pakhtunkhwa	Peshawar	Charsadda	2	11	10	10	
Khyber Pakhtunkhwa	Peshawar	Mohmand	1	11	10	10	
Khyber Pakhtunkhwa	Peshawar	Khyber	1	11	10	10	
Khyber Pakhtunkhwa	Peshawar	Peshawar	5	11	10	10	
Khyber Pakhtunkhwa	Peshawar	Nowshera	2	11	10	10	
Khyber Pakhtunkhwa	Kohat	Kohat	1	4	10	10	
Khyber Pakhtunkhwa	Kohat	Hangu	1	4	10	10	
Khyber Pakhtunkhwa	Kohat	Orakzai	1	4	10	10	
Khyber Pakhtunkhwa	Kohat	Kurram	1	4	10	10	
Khyber Pakhtunkhwa	Kohat	Karak	1	4	10	10	
Khyber Pakhtunkhwa	Bannu	Bannu	1	3	10	10	
Khyber Pakhtunkhwa	Bannu	North Waziristan	1	3	10	10	
Khyber Pakhtunkhwa	Bannu	Lakki Marwat	1	3	10	10	
Khyber Pakhtunkhwa	D.I Khan	Lower South Waziristan	1	4	10	10	
Khyber Pakhtunkhwa	D.I Khan	Upper South Waziristan	1	4	10	10	
Khyber Pakhtunkhwa	D.I Khan	Tank	1	4	10	10	
Khyber Pakhtunkhwa	D.I Khan	Dera Ismail Khan	2	4	10	10	
Khyber Pakhtunkhwa	Total Khyber Pakhtunkhwa		45		10	10	
Islamabad	-	Islamabad	3	-		10	
Islamabad	Total Islamabad		3		-	10	
Punjab	Rawalpindi	Attock	2	12	32	10	
Punjab	Rawalpindi	Murree	1	12	32	10	
Punjab	Rawalpindi	Rawalpindi	6	12	32	10	
Punjab	Rawalpindi	Chakwal	1	12	32	10	
Punjab	Rawalpindi	Jhelum	2	12	32	10	
Punjab	Gujrat	Gujrat	4	8	32	10	
Punjab	Gujrat	Wazirabad	1	8	32	10	
Punjab	Gujrat	Mandi Bahauddin	2	8	32	10	
Punjab	Gujrat	Hafizabad	1	8	32	10	
Punjab	Gujranwala	Sialkot	5	12	32	10	
Punjab	Gujranwala	Narowal	2	12	32	10	
Punjab	Gujranwala	Gujranwala	5	12	32	10	
Punjab	Sargodha	Sargodha	5	7	32	10	
Punjab	Sargodha	Khushab	2	7	32	10	
Punjab	Mianwali	Talagang	1	5	32	10	
Punjab	Mianwali	Mianwali	2	5	32	10	
Punjab	Mianwali	Bhakkar	2	5	32	10	
Punjab	Faisalabad	Chiniot	2	18	32	10	
Punjab	Faisalabad	Faisalabad	10	18	32	10	
Punjab	Faisalabad	Toba Tek Singh	3	18	32	10	
Punjab	Faisalabad	Jhang	3	18	32	10	
Punjab	Lahore	Nankana Sahib	2	24	32	10	
Punjab	Lahore	Sheikhupura	4	24	32	10	
Punjab	Lahore	Lahore	14	24	32	10	
Punjab	Lahore	Kasur	4	24	32	10	
Punjab	Sahiwal	Okara	4	9	32	10	
Punjab	Sahiwal	Pakpattan	2	9	32	10	
Punjab	Sahiwal	Sahiwal	3	9	32	10	
Punjab	Multan	Khanewal	4	16	32	10	
Punjab	Multan	Multan	6	16	32	10	
Punjab	Multan	Lodhran	2	16	32	10	
Punjab	Multan	Vehari	4	16	32	10	
Punjab	Bahawalpur	Bahawalnagar	4	15	32	10	
Punjab	Bahawalpur	Bahawalpur	5	15	32	10	
Punjab	Bahawalpur	Rahim Yar Khan	6	15	32	10	
Punjab	D.G Khan	Muzaffargarh	4	15	32	10	
Punjab	D.G Khan	Kot Addu	2	15	32	10	
Punjab	D.G Khan	Layyah	2	15	32	10	
Punjab	D.G Khan	Taunsa	1	15	32	10	
Punjab	D.G Khan	Dera Ghazi Khan	3	15	32	10	
Punjab	D.G Khan	Rajanpur	3	15	32	10	
Punjab	Total Punjab		141		32	10	
Sindh	Larkana	Jacobabad	1	8	14	10	
Sindh	Larkana	Kashmore	2	8	14	10	
Sindh	Larkana	Shikarpur	1	8	14	10	
Sindh	Larkana	Larkana	2	8	14	10	
Sindh	Larkana	Qambar Shahdadkot	2	8	14	10	
Sindh	Sukkur	Ghotki	2	7	14	10	
Sindh	Sukkur	Sukkur	2	7	14	10	
Sindh	Sukkur	Khairpur	3	7	14	10	
Sindh	Nawabshah	Naushahro Feroze	2	6	14	10	
Sindh	Nawabshah	Nawabshah	2	6	14	10	
Sindh	Nawabshah	Sanghar	2	6	14	10	
Sindh	Mirpur Khas	Mirpur Khas	2	5	14	10	
Sindh	Mirpur Khas	Umerkot	1	5	14	10	
Sindh	Mirpur Khas	Tharparkar	2	5	14	10	
Sindh	Hyderabad	Matiari	1	13	14	10	
Sindh	Hyderabad	Tando Allahyar	1	13	14	10	
Sindh	Hyderabad	Hyderabad	3	13	14	10	
Sindh	Hyderabad	Tando Muhammad Khan	1	13	14	10	
Sindh	Hyderabad	Jamshoro	1	13	14	10	
Sindh	Hyderabad	Dadu	2	13	14	10	
Sindh	Hyderabad	Badin	2	13	14	10	
Sindh	Hyderabad	Sujawal	1	13	14	10	
Sindh	Hyderabad	Thatta	1	13	14	10	
Sindh	Karachi	Malir	3	22	14	10	
Sindh	Karachi	Korangi	3	22	14	10	
Sindh	Karachi	Karachi East	4	22	14	10	
Sindh	Karachi	Karachi South	3	22	14	10	
Sindh	Karachi	Keamari	2	22	14	10	
Sindh	Karachi	Karachi West	3	22	14	10	
Sindh	Karachi	Karachi Central	4	22	14	10	
Sindh	Total Sindh		61		14	10	
Balochistan	Zhob	Sherani	1	1	4	10	
Balochistan	Zhob	Zhob	1	1	4	10	
Balochistan	Zhob	Killa Saifullah	1	1	4	10	
Balochistan	Loralai	Musakhel	1	1	4	10	
Balochistan	Loralai	Barkhan	1	1	4	10	
Balochistan	Loralai	Loralai	1	1	4	10	
Balochistan	Loralai	Duki	1	1	4	10	
Balochistan	Sibi	Ziarat	1	1	4	10	
Balochistan	Sibi	Harnai	1	1	4	10	
Balochistan	Sibi	Sibi	1	1	4	10	
Balochistan	Sibi	Kohlu	1	1	4	10	
Balochistan	Sibi	Dera Bugti	1	1	4	10	
Balochistan	Nasirabad	Jhal Magsi	1	2	4	10	
Balochistan	Nasirabad	Kachhi	1	2	4	10	
Balochistan	Nasirabad	Nasirabad	1	2	4	10	
Balochistan	Nasirabad	Sohbatpur	1	2	4	10	
Balochistan	Nasirabad	Jafarabad	1	2	4	10	
Balochistan	Nasirabad	Usta Muhammad	1	2	4	10	
Balochistan	Makran	Gwadar	1	2	4	10	
Balochistan	Makran	Kech	1	2	4	10	
Balochistan	Makran	Panjgur	1	2	4	10	
Balochistan	Kalat	Khuzdar	1	3	4	10	
Balochistan	Kalat	Hub	1	3	4	10	
Balochistan	Kalat	Lasbela	1	3	4	10	
Balochistan	Kalat	Awaran	1	3	4	10	
Balochistan	Kalat	Surab	1	3	4	10	
Balochistan	Kalat	Kalat	1	3	4	10	
Balochistan	Kalat	Mastung	1	3	4	10	
Balochistan	Rakhshan	Washuk	1	1	4	10	
Balochistan	Rakhshan	Chagai	1	1	4	10	
Balochistan	Rakhshan	Kharan	1	1	4	10	
Balochistan	Rakhshan	Nushki	1	1	4	10	
Balochistan	Quetta	Quetta	3	5	4	10	
Balochistan	Quetta	Pishin	1	5	4	10	
Balochistan	Quetta	Killa Abdullah	1	5	4	10	
Balochistan	Quetta	Chaman	1	5	4	10	
Balochistan	Total Balochistan		16		4	10	
Total Pakistan			266		60	10	336

== List of Provincial Assemblies constituencies ==
=== Punjab ===
The name of a constituency of the Provincial Assembly of the Punjab is as follows: PP (Province of Punjab) followed by a number. A member of the Provincial Assembly is called an MPA. The following table shows the distribution of seats of the Assembly among the districts of Punjab. 297 general seats are directly elected through the first-past-the-post system, where as 66 seats reserved for women and 8 seats reserved for non-Muslims are indirectly elected through proportional representation based on the proportion of general seats won by each party.

Map of The Punjab with Provincial Assembly Constituencies as of 2023

Division	District	General		Women	Non-Muslims	Total
Division	District	District	Division	Women	Non-Muslims	Total
Rawalpindi	Attock	5	24	66	8	
Rawalpindi	Murree	1	24	66	8	
Rawalpindi	Rawalpindi	13	24	66	8	
Rawalpindi	Chakwal	2	24	66	8	
Rawalpindi	Jhelum	3	24	66	8	
Gujrat	Gujrat	8	17	66	8	
Gujrat	Wazirabad	2	17	66	8	
Gujrat	Hafizabad	3	17	66	8	
Gujrat	Mandi Bahauddin	4	17	66	8	
Gujranwala	Sialkot	10	27	66	8	
Gujranwala	Narowal	5	27	66	8	
Gujranwala	Gujranwala	12	27	66	8	
Sargodha	Sargodha	10	14	66	8	
Sargodha	Khushab	4	14	66	8	
Mianwali	Talagang	2	11	66	8	
Mianwali	Mianwali	4	11	66	8	
Mianwali	Bhakkar	5	11	66	8	
Faisalabad	Chiniot	4	38	66	8	
Faisalabad	Faisalabad	21	38	66	8	
Faisalabad	Toba Tek Singh	6	38	66	8	
Faisalabad	Jhang	7	38	66	8	
Lahore	Nankana Sahib	4	53	66	8	
Lahore	Sheikhupura	9	53	66	8	
Lahore	Lahore	30	53	66	8	
Lahore	Kasur	10	53	66	8	
Sahiwal	Okara	8	20	66	8	
Sahiwal	Pakpattan	5	20	66	8	
Sahiwal	Sahiwal	7	20	66	8	
Multan	Khanewal	8	32	66	8	
Multan	Multan	12	32	66	8	
Multan	Lodhran	4	32	66	8	
Multan	Vehari	8	32	66	8	
Bahawalpur	Bahawalnagar	8	31	66	8	
Bahawalpur	Bahawalpur	10	31	66	8	
Bahawalpur	Rahim Yar Khan	13	31	66	8	
Dera Ghazi Khan	Muzaffargarh	8	30	66	8	
Dera Ghazi Khan	Kot Addu	3	30	66	8	
Dera Ghazi Khan	Layyah	5	30	66	8	
Dera Ghazi Khan	Taunsa	2	30	66	8	
Dera Ghazi Khan	Dera Ghazi Khan	6	30	66	8	
Dera Ghazi Khan	Rajanpur	6	30	66	8	
Total		297		66	8	371

=== Sindh ===
Map of Sindh with Provincial Assembly Constituencies as of 2022

The name of a constituency of Provincial Assembly of Sindh is called PS (Province of Sindh) followed by a number. A member of the Provincial Assembly is called an MPA. There are 168 seats in the Assembly, with 130 being general seats, 29 being reserved seats for women, and 9 being reserved seats for non-Muslims.

Division	District	General		Women	Non-Muslims	Total
Division	District	District	Division	Women	Non-Muslims	Total
Larkana	Jacobabad	3	17	29	9	
Larkana	Kashmore	3	17	29	9	
Larkana	Shikarpur	3	17	29	9	
Larkana	Larkana	4	17	29	9	
Larkana	Qambar Shahdadkot	4	17	29	9	
Sukkur	Ghotki	4	14	29	9	
Sukkur	Sukkur	4	14	29	9	
Sukkur	Khairpur	6	14	29	9	
Nawabshah	Naushahro Feroze	4	13	29	9	
Nawabshah	Nawabshah	4	13	29	9	
Nawabshah	Sanghar	5	13	29	9	
Mirpur Khas	Mirpur Khas	4	11	29	9	
Mirpur Khas	Umerkot	3	11	29	9	
Mirpur Khas	Tharparkar	4	11	29	9	
Hyderabad	Badin	5	28	29	9	
Hyderabad	Matiari	2	28	29	9	
Hyderabad	Sujawal	2	28	29	9	
Hyderabad	Tando Allahyar	2	28	29	9	
Hyderabad	Thatta	2	28	29	9	
Hyderabad	Hyderabad	6	28	29	9	
Hyderabad	Tando Muhammad Khan	2	28	29	9	
Hyderabad	Jamshoro	3	28	29	9	
Hyderabad	Dadu	4	28	29	9	
Karachi	Malir	6	47	29	9	
Karachi	Korangi	7	47	29	9	
Karachi	Karachi East	9	47	29	9	
Karachi	Karachi South	5	47	29	9	
Karachi	Keamari	5	47	29	9	
Karachi	Karachi West	6	47	29	9	
Karachi	Karachi Central	9	47	29	9	
Total		130		29	9	168

=== Balochistan ===
Map of Balochistan showing Provincial Assembly Constituencies as of 2022

The name of a constituency of Provincial Assembly of Balochistan is as follows: PB (Province of Balochistan) followed by a number. A member of the Provincial Assembly is called an MPA. There are 65 seats in this assembly, with 51 being general seats, 11 being reserved seats for women, and 3 being reserved seats for non-Muslims.

Division	District	General		Women	Non-Muslims	Total
Division	District	District	Division	Women	Non-Muslims	Total
Zhob	Sherani	1	3	11	3	
Zhob	Zhob	1	3	11	3	
Zhob	Zhob	1	3	11	3	
Zhob	Killa Saifullah	1	3	11	3	
Loralai	Musakhel	1	3	11	3	
Loralai	Barkhan	1	3	11	3	
Loralai	Loralai	1	3	11	3	
Loralai	Dukki	1	3	11	3	
Sibi	Ziarat	1	4	11	3	
Sibi	Harnai	1	4	11	3	
Sibi	Sibi	1	4	11	3	
Sibi	Kohlu	1	4	11	3	
Sibi	Dera Bugti	1	4	11	3	
Nasirabad	Jhal Magsi	1	7	11	3	
Nasirabad	Kachhi	1	7	11	3	
Nasirabad	Nasirabad	2	7	11	3	
Nasirabad	Sohbatpur	1	7	11	3	
Nasirabad	Jafarabad	1	7	11	3	
Nasirabad	Usta Muhammad	1	7	11	3	
Kalat	Khuzdar	3	9	11	3	
Kalat	Surab	1	9	11	3	
Kalat	Kalat	1	9	11	3	
Kalat	Mastung	1	9	11	3	
Kalat	Awaran	1	9	11	3	
Kalat	Hub	1	9	11	3	
Kalat	Lasbela	1	9	11	3	
Makran	Gwadar	1	6	11	3	
Makran	Kech	4	6	11	3	
Makran	Panjgur	1	6	11	3	
Rakhshan	Washuk	1	4	11	3	
Rakhshan	Chagai	1	4	11	3	
Rakhshan	Kharan	1	4	11	3	
Rakhshan	Nushki	1	4	11	3	
Quetta	Quetta	9	15	11	3	
Quetta	Karezat	1	15	11	3	
Quetta	Pishin	2	15	11	3	
Quetta	Killa Abdullah	1	15	11	3	
Quetta	Chaman	2	15	11	3	
	Total	51		11	3	65

=== Khyber Pakhtunkhwa ===
Map of Khyber Pakhtunkhwa showing Assembly constituencies as of 2022

The name of a constituency of the Provincial Assembly of Khyber Pakhtunkhwa is as follows: PK (Province of Khyber-Pakhtunkhwa) followed by a number. A member of the Provincial Assembly is called an MPA. There are 145 seats in the Assembly, with 115 being general seats, 26 being reserved seats for women, and 4 being reserved seats for non-Muslims.

Division	District	General		Women	Non-Muslims	Total
Division	District	District	Division	Women	Non-Muslims	Total
Malakand	Upper Chitral	1	27	26	4	
Malakand	Lower Chitral	1	27	26	4	
Malakand	Swat	7	27	26	4	
Malakand	Upper Dir	3	27	26	4	
Malakand	Lower Dir	5	27	26	4	
Malakand	Bajaur	3	27	26	4	
Malakand	Malakand	2	27	26	4	
Malakand	Buner	3	27	26	4	
Malakand	Shangla	2	27	26	4	
Hazara	Upper Kohistan	1	18	26	4	
Hazara	Lower Kohistan	1	18	26	4	
Hazara	Kolai-Palas	1	18	26	4	
Hazara	Battagram	2	18	26	4	
Hazara	Mansehra	5	18	26	4	
Hazara	Torghar	1	18	26	4	
Hazara	Abbottabad	4	18	26	4	
Hazara	Haripur	3	18	26	4	
Mardan	Swabi	5	13	26	4	
Mardan	Mardan	8	13	26	4	
Peshawar	Charsadda	5	29	26	4	
Peshawar	Mohmand	2	29	26	4	
Peshawar	Khyber	3	29	26	4	
Peshawar	Peshawar	14	29	26	4	
Peshawar	Nowshera	5	29	26	4	
Kohat	Kohat	4	11	26	4	
Kohat	Hangu	2	11	26	4	
Kohat	Orakzai	1	11	26	4	
Kohat	Kurram	2	11	26	4	
Kohat	Karak	2	11	26	4	
Bannu	Bannu	4	9	26	4	
Bannu	North Waziristan	2	9	26	4	
Bannu	Lakki Marwat	3	9	26	4	
D I Khan	Tank	1	8	26	4	
D I Khan	Upper South Waziristan	1	8	26	4	
D I Khan	Lower South Waziristan	1	8	26	4	
D I Khan	Dera Ismail Khan	5	8	26	4	
	Total	115		26	4	145

=== Gilgit Baltistan ===
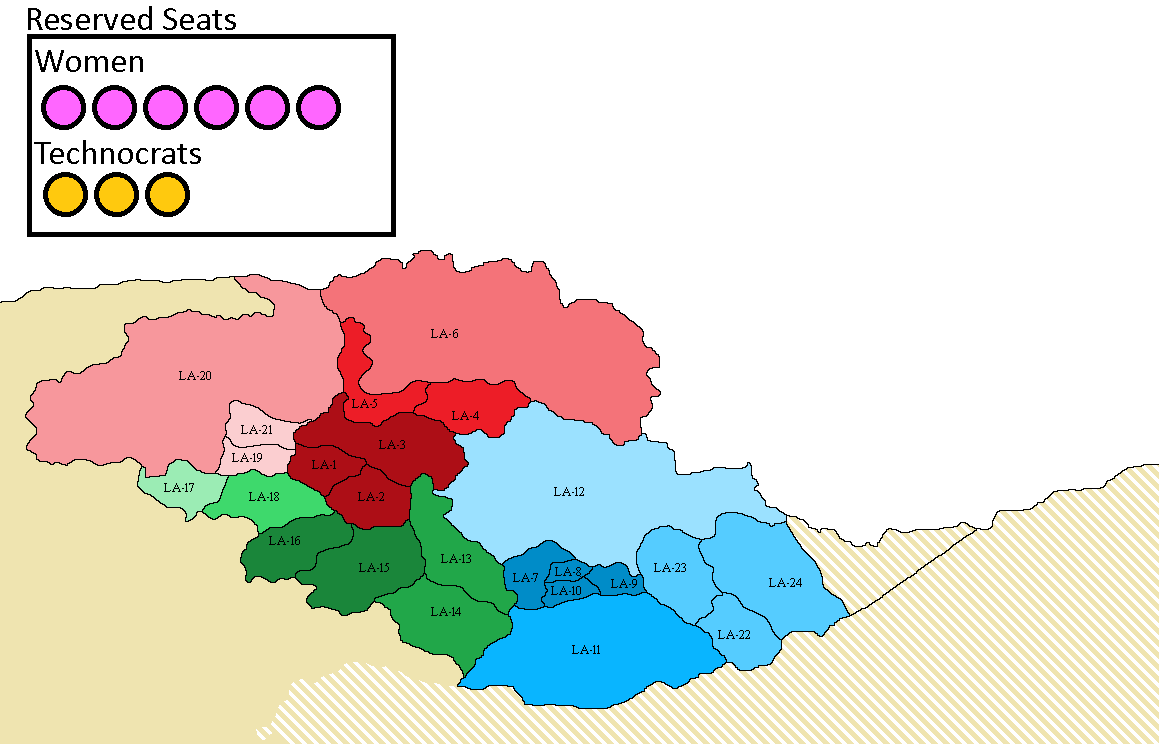
Map of Gilgit Baltistan Showing Assembly Constituencies

The constituency of Gilgit Baltistan Assembly is called GBA (Gilgit Baltistan Assembly). A total of 33 seats are in the assembly.

Detail	General	Women	Technocrats	Total
Gilgit	3	6	3	
Hunza	1	6	3	
Nagar	2	6	3	
Skardu	4	6	3	
Kharmang	1	6	3	
Shigar	1	6	3	
Astore	2	6	3	
Tangir	1	6	3	
Darel	1	6	3	
Diamir	2	6	3	
Ghizer	2	6	3	
Gupis–Yasin	1	6	3	
Ghanche	3	6	3	
Total	24	6	3	33

Constituencies of Gilgit Baltistan.

Below table shows constituencies of Gilgit Baltistan.

Constituencies of Gilgit Baltistan
District	Provincial Assembly	Number of Voters
Gilgit	GBA-1 Gilgit-I	30,556
Gilgit	GBA-2 Gilgit-II	33,733
Gilgit	GBA-3 Gilgit-III	34,103
Nagar	GBA-4 Nagar-I	18,805
Nagar	GBA-5 Nagar-II	11,989
Hunza	GBA-6 Hunza-I	36,427
Skardu	GBA-7 Skardu-I	16,552
Skardu	GBA-8 Skardu-II	34,210
Skardu	GBA-9 Skardu-III	20,559
Skardu	GBA-10 Skardu-IV	21,806
Kharmang	GBA-11 Kharmang-I	21,941
Shigar	GBA-12 Shigar-I	30,402
Astore	GBA-13 Astore-I	27,677
Astore	GBA-14 Astore-II	24,398
Diamir	GBA-15 Diamer-I	26,789
Diamir	GBA-16 (Diamer-II)	28,058
Tangir	GBA-17 Tangir-I	25,617
Darel	GBA-18 Darel-I	15,645
Ghizer	GBA-19 Ghizer-I	31,240
Gupis–Yasin	GBA-20 Gupis–Yasin-I	34,384
Ghizer	GBA-21 Ghizer-II	27,566
Ghanche	GBA-22 Ghanche-I	24,716
Ghanche	GBA-23 Ghanche-II	23,288
Ghanche	GBA-24 Ghanche-III	16,844
Total		6,17,305

=== Azad Jammu and Kashmir ===
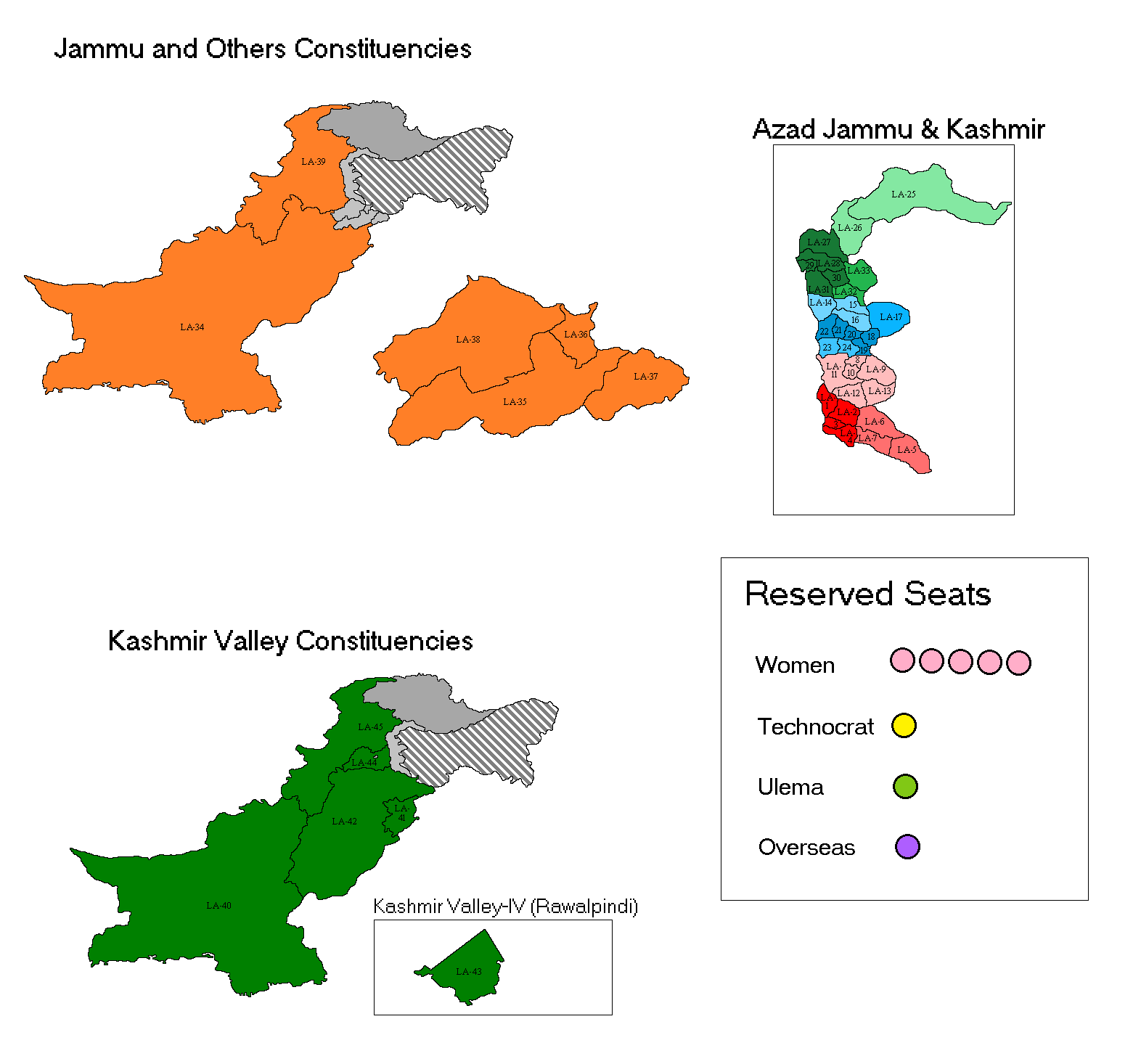
Map of Azad Kashmir showing Assembly Constituencies

The constituency of Azad Kashmir Assembly is called LA (Legislative Assembly).

District	General	Women	Technocrat	Ulema	Overseas	Total
Mirpur	4	5	1	1	1	
Bhimber	3	5	1	1	1	
Kotli	5	5	1	1	1	
Bagh	3	5	1	1	1	
Haveli	1	5	1	1	1	
Poonch	4	5	1	1	1	
Sudhnoti	2	5	1	1	1	
Neelum	1	5	1	1	1	
Muzaffarabad	4	5	1	1	1	
Hattian Bala	2	5	1	1	1	
Jammu and others	6	5	1	1	1	
Kashmir Valley	6	5	1	1	1	
Total	41	5	1	1	1	49

Tables show list of constituencies of provincial assemblies of Pakistan.

Constituencies of Azad Kashmir.

Below table shows constituencies of Azad Kashmir.

Constituencies of Azad Kashmir
District	Provincial Assembly	Number of Voters		
District	Provincial Assembly	Male	Female	Total
Mirpur	LA-1	48,216	45,264	93,480
Mirpur	LA-2	44,101	40,885	84,986
Mirpur	LA-3	45,447	40,470	85,917
Mirpur	LA-4	45,759	41,281	87,040
Bhimber	LA-5	45,979	36,641	82,620
Bhimber	LA-6	50,090	42,798	92,888
Bhimber	LA-7	59,581	52,448	96459
Kotli	LA-8	40,925	32,196	73,121
Kotli	LA-9	47,375	39,247	86,622
Kotli	LA-10	39,397	31,136	70,533
Kotli	LA-11	57,429	48,398	105,827
Kotli	LA-12	57,838	48,590	106,428
Bagh	LA-13	52,955	43,265	96,220
Bagh	LA-14	54,302	48,189	102,491
Bagh	LA-15	51,703	44,860	96,563
Haveli	LA-16	47,491	40,323	87,814
Poonch	LA-17	52,835	45,067	97,902
Poonch	LA-18	50,758	43,750	94,508
Poonch	LA-19	46,515	39,263	85,778
Poonch	LA-20	33,993	30,106	64,099
Sudhnoti	LA-21	31,126	28,547	59,673
Sudhnoti	LA-22	44,983	39,693	84,676
Neelam	LA-23	57,671	49,840	107,511
Muzaffarabad	LA-24	53,059	45,300	98,359
Muzaffarabad	LA-25	34,976	29,255	64,231
Muzaffarabad	LA-26	32,153	26,817	58,970
Muzaffarabad	LA-27	48,529	39,177	87,706
Hattian Bala	LA-28	44,943	36,568	81,511
Hattian Bala	LA-29	33,395	30,199	63,594
	LA-30	31,233	25,797	5,7030
	LA-31	58,074	48,506	106,580
	LA-32	39,299	31,566	70,865
	LA-33	37,173	30,695	67,868
Jammu & Others	LA-34	9,810	7,953	17,763
Jammu & Others	LA-35	47,580	34,967	82,547
Jammu & Others	LA-36	55,423	38,381	93,804
Jammu & Others	LA-37	56,944	38,750	95,694
Jammu & Others	LA-38	27,795	20,709	48,504
Jammu & Others	LA-39	19,549	16,906	36,455
Kashmir Valley	LA-40	2,670	2,657	5,327
Kashmir Valley	LA-41	2,736	2,314	5,050
Kashmir Valley	LA-42	2,420	2,041	4,461
Kashmir Valley	LA-43	1,322	1,135	2,457
Kashmir Valley	LA-44	3,376	2,964	6,340
Kashmir Valley	LA-45	3,860	3,091	6,951
Total voters		1,752,788	1,468,005	3,220,793

== National Assembly and Provincial Assembly Seat segments list ==
Constituency name of National Assembly along with the name of Provincial Assemblies in the same area with the area name.

Division	District	Provincial Assembly Constituency	National Assembly Constituency
Khyber Pakhtunkhwa
Malakand	Upper Chitral	PK-1 Upper Chitral	NA-1 Upper Chitral-cum-Lower Chitral
Malakand	Lower Chitral	PK-2 Lower Chitral	NA-1 Upper Chitral-cum-Lower Chitral
Malakand	Swat	PK-3 Swat-I	NA-2 Swat-I
Malakand	Swat	PK-4 Swat-II	NA-2 Swat-I
Malakand	Swat	PK-5 Swat-III	NA-2 Swat-I
Malakand	Swat	PK-6 Swat-IV	NA-3 Swat-II
Malakand	Swat	PK-7 Swat-V	NA-3 Swat-II
Malakand	Swat	PK-8 Swat-VI	NA-4 Swat-III
Malakand	Swat	PK-9 Swat-VII	NA-4 Swat-III
Malakand	Swat	PK-10 Swat-VIII	NA-4 Swat-III
Malakand	Upper Dir	PK-11 Upper Dir-I	NA-5 Upper Dir
Malakand	Upper Dir	PK-12 Upper Dir-II	NA-5 Upper Dir
Malakand	Upper Dir	PK-13 Upper Dir-III	NA-5 Upper Dir
Malakand	Lower Dir	PK-14 Lower Dir-I	NA-6 Lower Dir-I
Malakand	Lower Dir	PK-15 Lower Dir-II	NA-6 Lower Dir-I
Malakand	Lower Dir	PK-16 Lower Dir-III	NA-6 Lower Dir-I
Malakand	Lower Dir	PK-17 Lower Dir-IV	NA-7 Lower Dir-II
Malakand	Lower Dir	PK-18 Lower Dir-V	NA-7 Lower Dir-II
Malakand	Bajaur	PK-19 Bajaur-I	NA-8 Bajaur
Malakand	Bajaur	PK-20 Bajaur-II	NA-8 Bajaur
Malakand	Bajaur	PK-21 Bajaur-III	NA-8 Bajaur
Malakand	Bajaur	PK-22 Bajaur-IV	NA-8 Bajaur
Malakand	Malakand	PK-23 Malakand-I	NA-9 Malakand
Malakand	Malakand	PK-24 Malakand-II	NA-9 Malakand
Malakand	Buner	PK-25 Buner-I	NA-10 Buner
Malakand	Buner	PK-26 Buner-II	NA-10 Buner
Malakand	Buner	PK-27 Buner-III	NA-10 Buner
Malakand	Shangla	PK-28 Shangla-I	NA-11 Shangla
Malakand	Shangla	PK-29 Shangla-II	NA-11 Shangla
Malakand	Shangla	PK-30 Shangla-III	NA-11 Shangla
Hazara	Upper Kohistan	PK-31 Kohistan Upper	NA-12 Kohistan-cum-Lower Kohistan-cum-Kolai Palas Kohistan
Hazara	Lower Kohistan	PK-32 Kohistan Lower	NA-12 Kohistan-cum-Lower Kohistan-cum-Kolai Palas Kohistan
Hazara	Kolai-Palas	PK-33 Kolai Palas	NA-12 Kohistan-cum-Lower Kohistan-cum-Kolai Palas Kohistan
Hazara	Battagram	PK-34 Battagram-I	NA-13 Battagram
Hazara	Battagram	PK-35 Battagram-II	NA-13 Battagram
Hazara	Mansehra	PK-36 Mansehra-I	NA-14 Mansehra
Hazara	Mansehra	PK-37 Mansehra-II	NA-14 Mansehra
Hazara	Mansehra	PK-38 Mansehra-III	NA-15 Mansehra-cum-Torghar
Hazara	Mansehra	PK-39 Mansehra-IV	NA-15 Mansehra-cum-Torghar
Hazara	Mansehra	PK-40 Mansehra-V	NA-15 Mansehra-cum-Torghar
Hazara	Torghar	PK-41 Torghar	NA-15 Mansehra-cum-Torghar
Hazara	Abbottabad	PK-42 Abbottabad-I	NA-16 Abbottabad-I
Hazara	Abbottabad	PK-43 Abbottabad-II	NA-16 Abbottabad-I
Hazara	Abbottabad	PK-44 Abbottabad-III	NA-17 Abbottabad-II
Hazara	Abbottabad	PK-45 Abbottabad-IV	NA-17 Abbottabad-II
Hazara	Haripur	PK-46 Haripur-I	NA-18 Haripur
Hazara	Haripur	PK-47 Haripur-II	NA-18 Haripur
Hazara	Haripur	PK-48 Haripur-III	NA-18 Haripur
Mardan	Swabi	PK-49 Swabi-I	NA-19 Swabi-I
Mardan	Swabi	PK-50 Swabi-II	NA-19 Swabi-I
Mardan	Swabi	PK-51 Swabi-III	NA-19 Swabi-I
Mardan	Swabi	PK-52 Swabi-IV	NA-20 Swabi-II
Mardan	Swabi	PK-53 Swabi-V	NA-20 Swabi-II
Mardan	Mardan	PK-54 Mardan-I	NA-21 Mardan-I
Mardan	Mardan	PK-55 Mardan-II	NA-21 Mardan-I
Mardan	Mardan	PK-56 Mardan-III	NA-22 Mardan-II
Mardan	Mardan	PK-57 Mardan-IV	NA-22 Mardan-II
Mardan	Mardan	PK-58 Mardan-V	NA-22 Mardan-II
Mardan	Mardan	PK-59 Mardan-VI	NA-23 Mardan-III
Mardan	Mardan	PK-60 Mardan-VII	NA-23 Mardan-III
Mardan	Mardan	PK-61 Mardan-VIII	NA-23 Mardan-III
Peshawar	Charsadda	PK-62 Charsadda-I	NA-24 Charsadda-I
Peshawar	Charsadda	PK-66 Charsadda-V	NA-24 Charsadda-I
Peshawar	Charsadda	PK-63 Charsadda-II	NA-25 Charsadda-II
Peshawar	Charsadda	PK-65 Charsadda-IV	NA-25 Charsadda-II
Peshawar	Charsadda	PK-64 Charsadda-III	NA-25 Charsadda-II
Peshawar	Mohmand	PK-67 Mohmand-I	NA-26 Mohmand
Peshawar	Mohmand	PK-68 Mohmand-II	NA-26 Mohmand
Peshawar	Khyber	PK-69 Khyber-I	NA-27 Khyber
Peshawar	Khyber	PK-70 Khyber-II	NA-27 Khyber
Peshawar	Khyber	PK-71 Khyber-III	NA-27 Khyber
Peshawar	Peshawar	PK-72 Peshawar-I	NA-28 Peshawar-I
Peshawar	Peshawar	PK-73 Peshawar-II	NA-28 Peshawar-I
Peshawar	Peshawar	PK-74 Peshawar-III	NA-28 Peshawar-I
Peshawar	Peshawar	PK-75 Peshawar-IV	NA-29 Peshawar-II
Peshawar	Peshawar	PK-76 Peshawar-V	NA-29 Peshawar-II
Peshawar	Peshawar	PK-77 Peshawar-VI	NA-30 Peshawar-III
Peshawar	Peshawar	PK-78 Peshawar-VII	NA-30 Peshawar-III
Peshawar	Peshawar	PK-79 Peshawar-VIII	NA-31 Peshawar-IV
Peshawar	Peshawar	PK-80 Peshawar-IX	NA-31 Peshawar-IV
Peshawar	Peshawar	PK-81 Peshawar-X	NA-31 Peshawar-IV
Peshawar	Peshawar	PK-82 Peshawar-XI	NA-32 Peshawar-V
Peshawar	Peshawar	PK-83 Peshawar-XII	NA-32 Peshawar-V
Peshawar	Peshawar	PK-84 Peshawar-XIII	NA-32 Peshawar-V
Peshawar	Nowshera	PK-85 Nowshera-I	NA-33 Nowshera-I
Peshawar	Nowshera	PK-86 Nowshera-II	NA-33 Nowshera-I
Peshawar	Nowshera	PK-87 Nowshera-III	NA-33 Nowshera-I
Peshawar	Nowshera	PK-88 Nowshera-IV	NA-34 Nowshera-II
Peshawar	Nowshera	PK-89 Nowshera-V	NA-34 Nowshera-II
Kohat	Kohat	PK-90 Kohat-I	NA-35 Kohat
Kohat	Kohat	PK-91 Kohat-II	NA-35 Kohat
Kohat	Kohat	PK-92 Kohat-III	NA-35 Kohat
Kohat	Hangu	PK-93 Hangu	NA-36 Hangu-cum-Orakzai
Kohat	Orakzai	PK-94 Orakzai	NA-36 Hangu-cum-Orakzai
Kohat	Kurram	PK-95 Kurram-I	NA-37 Kurram
Kohat	Kurram	PK-96 Kurram-II	NA-37 Kurram
Kohat	Karak	PK-97 Karak-I	NA-38 Karak
Kohat	Karak	PK-98 Karak-II	NA-38 Karak
Bannu	Bannu	PK-99 Bannu-I	NA-39 Bannu
Bannu	Bannu	PK-100 Bannu-II	NA-39 Bannu
Bannu	Bannu	PK-101 Bannu-III	NA-39 Bannu
Bannu	Bannu	PK-102 Bannu-IV	NA-39 Bannu
Bannu	North Waziristan	PK-103 North Waziristan-I	NA-40 North Waziristan
Bannu	North Waziristan	PK-104 North Waziristan-II	NA-40 North Waziristan
Bannu	Lakki Marwat	PK-105 Lakki Marwat-I	NA-41 Lakki Marwat
Bannu	Lakki Marwat	PK-106 Lakki Marwat-II	NA-41 Lakki Marwat
Bannu	Lakki Marwat	PK-107 Lakki Marwat-III	NA-41 Lakki Marwat
D.I Khan	Upper South Waziristan	PK-109 Upper South Waziristan	NA-42 South Waziristan Upper-cum-South Waziristan Lower
D.I Khan	Lower South Waziristan	PK-110 Lower South Waziristan	NA-42 South Waziristan Upper-cum-South Waziristan Lower
D.I Khan	Tank	PK-108 Tank	NA-43 Tank-cum-Dera Ismail Khan
D.I Khan	Dera Ismail Khan	PK-111 Dera Ismail Khan-I	NA-43 Tank-cum-Dera Ismail Khan
D.I Khan	Dera Ismail Khan	PK-112 Dera Ismail Khan-II	NA-44 Dera Ismail Khan-I
D.I Khan	Dera Ismail Khan	PK-113 Dera Ismail Khan-III	NA-44 Dera Ismail Khan-I
D.I Khan	Dera Ismail Khan	PK-114 Dera Ismail Khan-IV	NA-45 Dera Ismail Khan-II
D.I Khan	Dera Ismail Khan	PK-115 Dera Ismail Khan-V	NA-45 Dera Ismail Khan-II
Islamabad
-	Islamabad	-	NA-46 Islamabad-I
-	Islamabad	-	NA-47 Islamabad-II
-	Islamabad	-	NA-48 Islamabad-III
Punjab
Rawalpindi	Attock	PP-1 Attock-I	NA-49 Attock-I
Rawalpindi	Attock	PP-2 Attock-II	NA-49 Attock-I
Rawalpindi	Attock	PP-3 Attock-III	NA-49 Attock-I
Rawalpindi	Attock	PP-4 Attock-IV	NA-50 Attock-II
Rawalpindi	Attock	PP-5 Attock-V	NA-50 Attock-II
Rawalpindi	Murree	PP-6 Murree	NA-51 Murree-cum-Rawalpindi
Rawalpindi	Rawalpindi	PP-7 Rawalpindi-I	NA-51 Murree-cum-Rawalpindi
Rawalpindi	Rawalpindi	PP-8 Rawalpindi-II	NA-52 Rawalpindi-I
Rawalpindi	Rawalpindi	PP-9 Rawalpindi-III	NA-52 Rawalpindi-I
Rawalpindi	Rawalpindi	PP-10 Rawalpindi-IV	NA-53 Rawalpindi-II
Rawalpindi	Rawalpindi	PP-11 Rawalpindi-V	NA-53 Rawalpindi-II
Rawalpindi	Rawalpindi	PP-12 Rawalpindi-VI	NA-54 Rawalpindi-III
Rawalpindi	Rawalpindi	PP-13 Rawalpindi-VII	NA-54 Rawalpindi-III
Rawalpindi	Rawalpindi	PP-14 Rawalpindi-VIII	NA-55 Rawalpindi-IV
Rawalpindi	Rawalpindi	PP-15 Rawalpindi-IX	NA-55 Rawalpindi-IV
Rawalpindi	Rawalpindi	PP-16 Rawalpindi-X	NA-56 Rawalpindi-V
Rawalpindi	Rawalpindi	PP-17 Rawalpindi-XI	NA-56 Rawalpindi-V
Rawalpindi	Rawalpindi	PP-18 Rawalpindi-XII	NA-57 Rawalpindi-VI
Rawalpindi	Rawalpindi	PP-19 Rawalpindi-XIII	NA-57 Rawalpindi-VI
Rawalpindi	Chakwal	PP-20 Chakwal-I	NA-58 Chakwal
Rawalpindi	Chakwal	PP-21 Chakwal-II	NA-58 Chakwal
Mianwali	Talagang	PP-22 Chakwal-cum-Talagang	NA-59 Chakwal-cum-Talagang
Mianwali	Talagang	PP-23 Talagang	NA-59 Chakwal-cum-Talagang
Rawalpindi	Jhelum	PP-24 Jhelum-I	NA-60 Jhelum-I
Rawalpindi	Jhelum	PP-25 Jhelum-II	NA-61 Jhelum-II
Rawalpindi	Jhelum	PP-26 Jhelum-III	NA-61 Jhelum-II
Gujrat	Gujrat	PP-27 Gujrat-I	NA-62 Gujrat-I
Gujrat	Gujrat	PP-28 Gujrat-II	NA-62 Gujrat-I
Gujrat	Gujrat	PP-29 Gujrat-III	NA-63 Gujrat-II
Gujrat	Gujrat	PP-30 Gujrat-IV	NA-63 Gujrat-II
Gujrat	Gujrat	PP-31 Gujrat-V	NA-64 Gujrat-III
Gujrat	Gujrat	PP-32 Gujrat-VI	NA-64 Gujrat-III
Gujrat	Gujrat	PP-33 Gujrat-VII	NA-65 Gujrat-IV
Gujrat	Gujrat	PP-34 Gujrat-VIII	NA-65 Gujrat-IV
Gujrat	Wazirabad	PP-35 Wazirabad-I	NA-66 Wazirabad
Gujrat	Wazirabad	PP-36 Wazirabad-II	NA-66 Wazirabad
Gujrat	Hafizabad	PP-37 Hafizabad-I	NA-67 Hafizabad
Gujrat	Hafizabad	PP-38 Hafizabad-II	NA-67 Hafizabad
Gujrat	Hafizabad	PP-39 Hafizabad-III	NA-67 Hafizabad
Gujrat	Mandi Bahauddin	PP-40 Mandi Bahauddin-I	NA-68 Mandi Bahauddin-I
Gujrat	Mandi Bahauddin	PP-41 Mandi Bahauddin-II	NA-68 Mandi Bahauddin-I
Gujrat	Mandi Bahauddin	PP-42 Mandi Bahauddin-III	NA-69 Mandi Bahauddin-II
Gujrat	Mandi Bahauddin	PP-43 Mandi Bahauddin-IV	NA-69 Mandi Bahauddin-II
Gujranwala	Sialkot	PP-44 Sialkot-I	NA-70 Sialkot-I
Gujranwala	Sialkot	PP-45 Sialkot-II	NA-70 Sialkot-I
Gujranwala	Sialkot	PP-46 Sialkot-III	NA-71 Sialkot-II
Gujranwala	Sialkot	PP-47 Sialkot-IV	NA-71 Sialkot-II
Gujranwala	Sialkot	PP-48 Sialkot-V	NA-72 Sialkot-III
Gujranwala	Sialkot	PP-49 Sialkot-VI	NA-72 Sialkot-III
Gujranwala	Sialkot	PP-50 Sialkot-VII	NA-73 Sialkot-IV
Gujranwala	Sialkot	PP-51 Sialkot-VIII	NA-73 Sialkot-IV
Gujranwala	Sialkot	PP-52 Sialkot-IX	NA-74 Sialkot-V
Gujranwala	Sialkot	PP-53 Sialkot-X	NA-74 Sialkot-V
Gujranwala	Narowal	PP-54 Narowal-I	NA-75 Narowal-I
Gujranwala	Narowal	PP-55 Narowal-II	NA-75 Narowal-I
Gujranwala	Narowal	PP-56 Narowal-III	NA-76 Narowal-II
Gujranwala	Narowal	PP-57 Narowal-IV	NA-76 Narowal-II
Gujranwala	Narowal	PP-58 Narowal-V	NA-76 Narowal-II
Gujranwala	Gujranwala	PP-59 Gujranwala-I	NA-77 Gujranwala-I
Gujranwala	Gujranwala	PP-70 Gujranwala-XII	NA-77 Gujranwala-I
Gujranwala	Gujranwala	PP-60 Gujranwala-II	NA-78 Gujranwala-II
Gujranwala	Gujranwala	PP-61 Gujranwala-III	NA-78 Gujranwala-II
Gujranwala	Gujranwala	PP-65 Gujranwala-VII	NA-79 Gujranwala-III
Gujranwala	Gujranwala	PP-66 Gujranwala-VIII	NA-79 Gujranwala-III
Gujranwala	Gujranwala	PP-67 Gujranwala-IX	NA-79 Gujranwala-III
Gujranwala	Gujranwala	PP-62 Gujranwala-IV	NA-80 Gujranwala-IV
Gujranwala	Gujranwala	PP-63 Gujranwala-V	NA-80 Gujranwala-IV
Gujranwala	Gujranwala	PP-64 Gujranwala-VI	NA-80 Gujranwala-IV
Gujranwala	Gujranwala	PP-68 Gujranwala-X	NA-81 Gujranwala-V
Gujranwala	Gujranwala	PP-69 Gujranwala-XI	NA-81 Gujranwala-V
Sargodha	Sargodha	PP-71 Sargodha-I	NA-82 Sargodha-I
Sargodha	Sargodha	PP-72 Sargodha-II	NA-82 Sargodha-I
Sargodha	Sargodha	PP-73 Sargodha-III	NA-83 Sargodha-II
Sargodha	Sargodha	PP-74 Sargodha-IV	NA-83 Sargodha-II
Sargodha	Sargodha	PP-75 Sargodha-V	NA-84 Sargodha-III
Sargodha	Sargodha	PP-76 Sargodha-VI	NA-84 Sargodha-III
Sargodha	Sargodha	PP-77 Sargodha-VII	NA-85 Sargodha-IV
Sargodha	Sargodha	PP-78 Sargodha-VIII	NA-85 Sargodha-IV
Sargodha	Sargodha	PP-79 Sargodha-IX	NA-86 Sargodha-V
Sargodha	Sargodha	PP-80 Sargodha-X	NA-86 Sargodha-V
Sargodha	Khushab	PP-81 Khushab-I	NA-87 Khushab-I
Sargodha	Khushab	PP-82 Khushab-II	NA-87 Khushab-I
Sargodha	Khushab	PP-83 Khushab-III	NA-88 Khushab-II
Sargodha	Khushab	PP-84 Khushab-IV	NA-88 Khushab-II
Mianwali	Mianwali	PP-85 Mianwali-I	NA-89 Mianwali-I
Mianwali	Mianwali	PP-86 Mianwali-II	NA-89 Mianwali-I
Mianwali	Mianwali	PP-87 Mianwali-III	NA-90 Mianwali-II
Mianwali	Mianwali	PP-88 Mianwali-IV	NA-90 Mianwali-II
Mianwali	Bhakkar	PP-89 Bhakkar-I	NA-91 Bhakkar-I
Mianwali	Bhakkar	PP-90 Bhakkar-II	NA-91 Bhakkar-I
Mianwali	Bhakkar	PP-91 Bhakkar-III	NA-92 Bhakkar-II
Mianwali	Bhakkar	PP-92 Bhakkar-IV	NA-92 Bhakkar-II
Mianwali	Bhakkar	PP-93 Bhakkar-V	NA-92 Bhakkar-II
Faisalabad	Chiniot	PP-94 Chiniot-I	NA-93 Chiniot-I
Faisalabad	Chiniot	PP-97 Chiniot-IV	NA-93 Chiniot-I
Faisalabad	Chiniot	PP-95 Chiniot-II	NA-94 Chiniot-II
Faisalabad	Chiniot	PP-96 Chiniot-III	NA-94 Chiniot-II
Faisalabad	Faisalabad	PP-98 Faisalabad-I	NA-95 Faisalabad-I
Faisalabad	Faisalabad	PP-99 Faisalabad-II	NA-95 Faisalabad-I
Faisalabad	Faisalabad	PP-100 Faisalabad-III	NA-96 Faisalabad-II
Faisalabad	Faisalabad	PP-101 Faisalabad-IV	NA-96 Faisalabad-II
Faisalabad	Faisalabad	PP-102 Faisalabad-V	NA-97 Faisalabad-III
Faisalabad	Faisalabad	PP-103 Faisalabad-VI	NA-97 Faisalabad-III
Faisalabad	Faisalabad	PP-104 Faisalabad-VII	NA-98 Faisalabad-IV
Faisalabad	Faisalabad	PP-105 Faisalabad-VIII	NA-98 Faisalabad-IV
Faisalabad	Faisalabad	PP-106 Faisalabad-IX	NA-99 Faisalabad-V
Faisalabad	Faisalabad	PP-107 Faisalabad-X	NA-99 Faisalabad-V
Faisalabad	Faisalabad	PP-108 Faisalabad-XI	NA-100 Faisalabad-VI
Faisalabad	Faisalabad	PP-109 Faisalabad-XII	NA-100 Faisalabad-VI
Faisalabad	Faisalabad	PP-113 Faisalabad-XVI	NA-101 Faisalabad-VII
Faisalabad	Faisalabad	PP-114 Faisalabad-XVII	NA-101 Faisalabad-VII
Faisalabad	Faisalabad	PP-115 Faisalabad-XVIII	NA-102 Faisalabad-VIII
Faisalabad	Faisalabad	PP-116 Faisalabad-XIX	NA-102 Faisalabad-VIII
Faisalabad	Faisalabad	PP-117 Faisalabad-XX	NA-103 Faisalabad-IX
Faisalabad	Faisalabad	PP-118 Faisalabad-XXI	NA-103 Faisalabad-IX
Faisalabad	Faisalabad	PP-110 Faisalabad-XIII	NA-104 Faisalabad-X
Faisalabad	Faisalabad	PP-111 Faisalabad-XIV	NA-104 Faisalabad-X
Faisalabad	Faisalabad	PP-112 Faisalabad-XV	NA-104 Faisalabad-X
Faisalabad	Toba Tek Singh	PP-119 Toba Tek Singh-I	NA-105 Toba Tek Singh-I
Faisalabad	Toba Tek Singh	PP-120 Toba Tek Singh-II	NA-105 Toba Tek Singh-I
Faisalabad	Toba Tek Singh	PP-121 Toba Tek Singh-III	NA-106 Toba Tek Singh-II
Faisalabad	Toba Tek Singh	PP-122 Toba Tek Singh-IV	NA-106 Toba Tek Singh-II
Faisalabad	Toba Tek Singh	PP-123 Toba Tek Singh-V	NA-107 Toba Tek Singh-III
Faisalabad	Toba Tek Singh	PP-124 Toba Tek Singh-VI	NA-107 Toba Tek Singh-III
Faisalabad	Jhang	PP-125 Jhang-I	NA-108 Jhang-I
Faisalabad	Jhang	PP-126 Jhang-II	NA-108 Jhang-I
Faisalabad	Jhang	PP-131 Jhang-VII	NA-108 Jhang-I
Faisalabad	Jhang	PP-127 Jhang-III	NA-109 Jhang-II
Faisalabad	Jhang	PP-128 Jhang-IV	NA-109 Jhang-II
Faisalabad	Jhang	PP-129 Jhang-V	NA-110 Jhang-III
Faisalabad	Jhang	PP-130 Jhang-VI	NA-110 Jhang-III
Lahore	Nankana Sahib	PP-132 Nankana Sahib-I	NA-111 Nankana Sahib-I
Lahore	Nankana Sahib	PP-133 Nankana Sahib-II	NA-111 Nankana Sahib-I
Lahore	Nankana Sahib	PP-134 Nankana Sahib-III	NA-112 Nankana Sahib-II
Lahore	Nankana Sahib	PP-135 Nankana Sahib-IV	NA-112 Nankana Sahib-II
Lahore	Sheikhupura	PP-136 Sheikhupura-I	NA-113 Sheikhupura-I
Lahore	Sheikhupura	PP-137 Sheikhupura-II	NA-113 Sheikhupura-I
Lahore	Sheikhupura	PP-138 Sheikhupura-III	NA-114 Sheikhupura-II
Lahore	Sheikhupura	PP-139 Sheikhupura-IV	NA-114 Sheikhupura-II
Lahore	Sheikhupura	PP-140 Sheikhupura-V	NA-114 Sheikhupura-II
Lahore	Sheikhupura	PP-141 Sheikhupura-VI	NA-115 Sheikhupura-III
Lahore	Sheikhupura	PP-142 Sheikhupura-VII	NA-115 Sheikhupura-III
Lahore	Sheikhupura	PP-143 Sheikhupura-VIII	NA-116 Sheikhupura-IV
Lahore	Sheikhupura	PP-144 Sheikhupura-IX	NA-116 Sheikhupura-IV
Lahore	Lahore	PP-145 Lahore-I	NA-117 Lahore-I
Lahore	Lahore	PP-146 Lahore-II	NA-117 Lahore-I
Lahore	Lahore	PP-147 Lahore-III	NA-118 Lahore-II
Lahore	Lahore	PP-148 Lahore-IV	NA-118 Lahore-II
Lahore	Lahore	PP-149 Lahore-V	NA-119 Lahore-III
Lahore	Lahore	PP-150 Lahore-VI	NA-119 Lahore-III
Lahore	Lahore	PP-151 Lahore-VII	NA-120 Lahore-IV
Lahore	Lahore	PP-154 Lahore-X	NA-120 Lahore-IV
Lahore	Lahore	PP-152 Lahore-VIII	NA-121 Lahore-V
Lahore	Lahore	PP-153 Lahore-IX	NA-121 Lahore-V
Lahore	Lahore	PP-155 Lahore-XI	NA-122 Lahore-VI
Lahore	Lahore	PP-156 Lahore-XII	NA-122 Lahore-VI
Lahore	Lahore	PP-157 Lahore-XIII	NA-122 Lahore-VI
Lahore	Lahore	PP-158 Lahore-XIV	NA-123 Lahore-VII
Lahore	Lahore	PP-164 Lahore-XX	NA-123 Lahore-VII
Lahore	Lahore	PP-159 Lahore-XV	NA-124 Lahore-VIII
Lahore	Lahore	PP-163 Lahore-XIX	NA-124 Lahore-VIII
Lahore	Lahore	PP-165 Lahore-XXI	NA-125 Lahore-IX
Lahore	Lahore	PP-166 Lahore-XXII	NA-125 Lahore-IX
Lahore	Lahore	PP-167 Lahore-XXIII	NA-126 Lahore-X
Lahore	Lahore	PP-168 Lahore-XXIV	NA-126 Lahore-X
Lahore	Lahore	PP-160 Lahore-XVI	NA-127 Lahore-XI
Lahore	Lahore	PP-162 Lahore-XVIII	NA-127 Lahore-XI
Lahore	Lahore	PP-161 Lahore-XVII	NA-128 Lahore-XII
Lahore	Lahore	PP-169 Lahore-XXV	NA-128 Lahore-XII
Lahore	Lahore	PP-170 Lahore-XXVI	NA-128 Lahore-XII
Lahore	Lahore	PP-171 Lahore-XXVII	NA-129 Lahore-XIII
Lahore	Lahore	PP-172 Lahore-XXVIII	NA-129 Lahore-XIII
Lahore	Lahore	PP-173 Lahore-XXIX	NA-130 Lahore-XIV
Lahore	Lahore	PP-174 Lahore-XXX	NA-130 Lahore-XIV
Lahore	Kasur	PP-176 Kasur-II	NA-131 Kasur-I
Lahore	Kasur	PP-177 Kasur-III	NA-131 Kasur-I
Lahore	Kasur	PP-178 Kasur-IV	NA-131 Kasur-I
Lahore	Kasur	PP-175 Kasur-I	NA-132 Kasur-II
Lahore	Kasur	PP-179 Kasur-V	NA-132 Kasur-II
Lahore	Kasur	PP-180 Kasur-VI	NA-133 Kasur-III
Lahore	Kasur	PP-181 Kasur-VII	NA-133 Kasur-III
Lahore	Kasur	PP-182 Kasur-VIII	NA-134 Kasur-IV
Lahore	Kasur	PP-183 Kasur-IX	NA-134 Kasur-IV
Lahore	Kasur	PP-184 Kasur-X	NA-134 Kasur-IV
Sahiwal	Okara	PP-185 Okara-I	NA-135 Okara-I
Sahiwal	Okara	PP-192 Okara-VIII	NA-135 Okara-I
Sahiwal	Okara	PP-190 Okara-VI	NA-136 Okara-II
Sahiwal	Okara	PP-191 Okara-VII	NA-136 Okara-II
Sahiwal	Okara	PP-186 Okara-II	NA-137 Okara-III
Sahiwal	Okara	PP-189 Okara-V	NA-137 Okara-III
Sahiwal	Okara	PP-187 Okara-III	NA-138 Okara-IV
Sahiwal	Okara	PP-188 Okara-IV	NA-138 Okara-IV
Sahiwal	Pakpattan	PP-193 Pakpattan-I	NA-139 Pakpattan-I
Sahiwal	Pakpattan	PP-194 Pakpattan-II	NA-139 Pakpattan-I
Sahiwal	Pakpattan	PP-197 Pakpattan-V	NA-139 Pakpattan-I
Sahiwal	Pakpattan	PP-195 Pakpattan-III	NA-140 Pakpattan-II
Sahiwal	Pakpattan	PP-196 Pakpattan-IV	NA-140 Pakpattan-II
Sahiwal	Sahiwal	PP-198 Sahiwal-I	NA-141 Sahiwal-I
Sahiwal	Sahiwal	PP-199 Sahiwal-II	NA-141 Sahiwal-I
Sahiwal	Sahiwal	PP-200 Sahiwal-III	NA-142 Sahiwal-II
Sahiwal	Sahiwal	PP-201 Sahiwal-IV	NA-142 Sahiwal-II
Sahiwal	Sahiwal	PP-202 Sahiwal-V	NA-142 Sahiwal-II
Sahiwal	Sahiwal	PP-203 Sahiwal-VI	NA-143 Sahiwal-III
Sahiwal	Sahiwal	PP-204 Sahiwal-VII	NA-143 Sahiwal-III
Multan	Khanewal	PP-205 Khanewal-I	NA-144 Khanewal-I
Multan	Khanewal	PP-212 Khanewal-VIII	NA-144 Khanewal-I
Multan	Khanewal	PP-206 Khanewal-II	NA-145 Khanewal-II
Multan	Khanewal	PP-211 Khanewal-VII	NA-145 Khanewal-II
Multan	Khanewal	PP-207 Khanewal-III	NA-146 Khanewal-III
Multan	Khanewal	PP-208 Khanewal-IV	NA-146 Khanewal-III
Multan	Khanewal	PP-209 Khanewal-V	NA-147 Khanewal-IV
Multan	Khanewal	PP-210 Khanewal-VI	NA-147 Khanewal-IV
Multan	Multan	PP-213 Multan-I	NA-148 Multan-I
Multan	Multan	PP-214 Multan-II	NA-148 Multan-I
Multan	Multan	PP-215 Multan-III	NA-149 Multan-II
Multan	Multan	PP-216 Multan-IV	NA-149 Multan-II
Multan	Multan	PP-217 Multan-V	NA-150 Multan-III
Multan	Multan	PP-218 Multan-VI	NA-150 Multan-III
Multan	Multan	PP-219 Multan-VII	NA-151 Multan-IV
Multan	Multan	PP-220 Multan-VIII	NA-151 Multan-IV
Multan	Multan	PP-221 Multan-IX	NA-152 Multan-V
Multan	Multan	PP-222 Multan-X	NA-152 Multan-V
Multan	Multan	PP-223 Multan-XI	NA-153 Multan-VI
Multan	Multan	PP-224 Multan-XII	NA-153 Multan-VI
Multan	Lodhran	PP-225 Lodhran-I	NA-154 Lodhran-I
Multan	Lodhran	PP-226 Lodhran-II	NA-154 Lodhran-I
Multan	Lodhran	PP-227 Lodhran-III	NA-155 Lodhran-II
Multan	Lodhran	PP-228 Lodhran-IV	NA-155 Lodhran-II
Multan	Vehari	PP-229 Vehari-I	NA-156 Vehari-I
Multan	Vehari	PP-231 Vehari-III	NA-156 Vehari-I
Multan	Vehari	PP-230 Vehari-II	NA-157 Vehari-II
Multan	Vehari	PP-232 Vehari-IV	NA-157 Vehari-II
Multan	Vehari	PP-233 Vehari-V	NA-158 Vehari-III
Multan	Vehari	PP-234 Vehari-VI	NA-158 Vehari-III
Multan	Vehari	PP-235 Vehari-VII	NA-159 Vehari-IV
Multan	Vehari	PP-236 Vehari-VIII	NA-159 Vehari-IV
Bahawalpur	Bahawalnagar	PP-237 Bahawalnagar-I	NA-160 Bahawalnagar-I
Bahawalpur	Bahawalnagar	PP-238 Bahawalnagar-II	NA-160 Bahawalnagar-I
Bahawalpur	Bahawalnagar	PP-239 Bahawalnagar-III	NA-161 Bahawalnagar-II
Bahawalpur	Bahawalnagar	PP-240 Bahawalnagar-IV	NA-161 Bahawalnagar-II
Bahawalpur	Bahawalnagar	PP-243 Bahawalnagar-VII	NA-162 Bahawalnagar-III
Bahawalpur	Bahawalnagar	PP-244 Bahawalnagar-VIII	NA-162 Bahawalnagar-III
Bahawalpur	Bahawalnagar	PP-241 Bahawalnagar-V	NA-163 Bahawalnagar-IV
Bahawalpur	Bahawalnagar	PP-242 Bahawalnagar-VI	NA-163 Bahawalnagar-IV
Bahawalpur	Bahawalpur	PP-245 Bahawalpur-I	NA-164 Bahawalpur-I
Bahawalpur	Bahawalpur	PP-246 Bahawalpur-II	NA-164 Bahawalpur-I
Bahawalpur	Bahawalpur	PP-247 Bahawalpur-III	NA-165 Bahawalpur-II
Bahawalpur	Bahawalpur	PP-248 Bahawalpur-IV	NA-165 Bahawalpur-II
Bahawalpur	Bahawalpur	PP-249 Bahawalpur-V	NA-166 Bahawalpur-III
Bahawalpur	Bahawalpur	PP-250 Bahawalpur-VI	NA-166 Bahawalpur-III
Bahawalpur	Bahawalpur	PP-251 Bahawalpur-VII	NA-167 Bahawalpur-IV
Bahawalpur	Bahawalpur	PP-252 Bahawalpur-VIII	NA-167 Bahawalpur-IV
Bahawalpur	Bahawalpur	PP-253 Bahawalpur-IX	NA-168 Bahawalpur-V
Bahawalpur	Bahawalpur	PP-254 Bahawalpur-X	NA-168 Bahawalpur-V
Bahawalpur	Rahim Yar Khan	PP-255 Rahim Yar Khan-I	NA-169 Rahim Yar Khan-I
Bahawalpur	Rahim Yar Khan	PP-256 Rahim Yar Khan-II	NA-169 Rahim Yar Khan-I
Bahawalpur	Rahim Yar Khan	PP-257 Rahim Yar Khan-III	NA-170 Rahim Yar Khan-II
Bahawalpur	Rahim Yar Khan	PP-258 Rahim Yar Khan-IV	NA-170 Rahim Yar Khan-II
Bahawalpur	Rahim Yar Khan	PP-259 Rahim Yar Khan-V	NA-171 Rahim Yar Khan-III
Bahawalpur	Rahim Yar Khan	PP-260 Rahim Yar Khan-VI	NA-171 Rahim Yar Khan-III
Bahawalpur	Rahim Yar Khan	PP-261 Rahim Yar Khan-VII	NA-172 Rahim Yar Khan-IV
Bahawalpur	Rahim Yar Khan	PP-264 Rahim Yar Khan-X	NA-172 Rahim Yar Khan-IV
Bahawalpur	Rahim Yar Khan	PP-267 Rahim Yar Khan-XIII	NA-172 Rahim Yar Khan-IV
Bahawalpur	Rahim Yar Khan	PP-262 Rahim Yar Khan-VIII	NA-173 Rahim Yar Khan-V
Bahawalpur	Rahim Yar Khan	PP-263 Rahim Yar Khan-IX	NA-173 Rahim Yar Khan-V
Bahawalpur	Rahim Yar Khan	PP-265 Rahim Yar Khan-XI	NA-174 Rahim Yar Khan-VI
Bahawalpur	Rahim Yar Khan	PP-266 Rahim Yar Khan-XII	NA-174 Rahim Yar Khan-VI
Dera Ghazi Khan	Muzaffargarh	PP-268 Muzaffargarh-I	NA-175 Muzaffargarh-I
Dera Ghazi Khan	Muzaffargarh	PP-269 Muzaffargarh-II	NA-175 Muzaffargarh-I
Dera Ghazi Khan	Muzaffargarh	PP-270 Muzaffargarh-III	NA-176 Muzaffargarh-II
Dera Ghazi Khan	Muzaffargarh	PP-271 Muzaffargarh-IV	NA-176 Muzaffargarh-II
Dera Ghazi Khan	Muzaffargarh	PP-272 Muzaffargarh-V	NA-177 Muzaffargarh-III
Dera Ghazi Khan	Muzaffargarh	PP-273 Muzaffargarh-VI	NA-177 Muzaffargarh-III
Dera Ghazi Khan	Muzaffargarh	PP-274 Muzaffargarh-VII	NA-178 Muzaffargarh-IV
Dera Ghazi Khan	Muzaffargarh	PP-275 Muzaffargarh-VIII	NA-178 Muzaffargarh-IV
Dera Ghazi Khan	Kot Addu	PP-276 Kot Addu-I	NA-179 Kot Addu-I
Dera Ghazi Khan	Kot Addu	PP-278 Kot Addu-III	NA-179 Kot Addu-I
Dera Ghazi Khan	Kot Addu	PP-277 Kot Addu-II	NA-180 Kot Addu-II
Dera Ghazi Khan	Layyah	PP-279 Layyah-I	NA-181 Layyah-I
Dera Ghazi Khan	Layyah	PP-280 Layyah-II	NA-181 Layyah-I
Dera Ghazi Khan	Layyah	PP-281 Layyah-III	NA-181 Layyah-I
Dera Ghazi Khan	Layyah	PP-282 Layyah-IV	NA-182 Layyah-II
Dera Ghazi Khan	Layyah	PP-283 Layyah-V	NA-182 Layyah-II
Dera Ghazi Khan	Taunsa	PP-284 Taunsa-I	NA-183 Taunsa
Dera Ghazi Khan	Taunsa	PP-285 Taunsa-II	NA-183 Taunsa
Dera Ghazi Khan	Dera Ghazi Khan	PP-286 Dera Ghazi Khan-I	NA-184 Dera Ghazi Khan-I
Dera Ghazi Khan	Dera Ghazi Khan	PP-287 Dera Ghazi Khan-II	NA-184 Dera Ghazi Khan-I
Dera Ghazi Khan	Dera Ghazi Khan	PP-288 Dera Ghazi Khan-III	NA-185 Dera Ghazi Khan-II
Dera Ghazi Khan	Dera Ghazi Khan	PP-289 Dera Ghazi Khan-IV	NA-185 Dera Ghazi Khan-II
Dera Ghazi Khan	Dera Ghazi Khan	PP-290 Dera Ghazi Khan-V	NA-186 Dera Ghazi Khan-III
Dera Ghazi Khan	Dera Ghazi Khan	PP-291 Dera Ghazi Khan-VI	NA-186 Dera Ghazi Khan-III
Dera Ghazi Khan	Rajanpur	PP-292 Rajanpur-I	NA-187 Rajanpur-I
Dera Ghazi Khan	Rajanpur	PP-293 Rajanpur-II	NA-187 Rajanpur-I
Dera Ghazi Khan	Rajanpur	PP-294 Rajanpur-III	NA-188 Rajanpur-II
Dera Ghazi Khan	Rajanpur	PP-295 Rajanpur-IV	NA-188 Rajanpur-II
Dera Ghazi Khan	Rajanpur	PP-296 Rajanpur-V	NA-189 Rajanpur-III
Dera Ghazi Khan	Rajanpur	PP-297 Rajanpur-VI	NA-189 Rajanpur-III
Sindh
Larkana	Jacobabad	PS-1 Jacobabad-I	NA-190 Jacobabad
Larkana	Jacobabad	PS-2 Jacobabad-II	NA-190 Jacobabad
Larkana	Jacobabad	PS-3 Jacobabad-III	NA-190 Jacobabad
Larkana	Kashmore	PS-4 Kashmore-I	NA-191 Jacobabad-cum-Kashmore
Larkana	Kashmore	PS-5 Kashmore-II	NA-191 Jacobabad-cum-Kashmore
Larkana	Kashmore	PS-6 Kashmore-III	NA-191 Jacobabad-cum-Kashmore
Larkana	Shikarpur	PS-7 Shikarpur-I	NA-192 Kashmore-cum-Shikarpur
Larkana	Shikarpur	PS-8 Shikarpur-II	NA-192 Kashmore-cum-Shikarpur
Larkana	Shikarpur	PS-9 Shikarpur-III	NA-193 Shikarpur
Larkana	Larkana	PS-10 Larkana-I	NA-194 Larkana-I
Larkana	Larkana	PS-11 Larkana-II	NA-194 Larkana-I
Larkana	Larkana	PS-12 Larkana-III	NA-195 Larkana-II
Larkana	Larkana	PS-13 Larkana-IV	NA-195 Larkana-II
Larkana	Qambar Shahdadkot	PS-14 Qambar Shahdadkot-I	NA-196 Qambar Shahdadkot-I
Larkana	Qambar Shahdadkot	PS-15 Qambar Shahdadkot-II	NA-196 Qambar Shahdadkot-I
Larkana	Qambar Shahdadkot	PS-16 Qambar Shahdadkot-III	NA-197 Qambar Shahdadkot-II
Larkana	Qambar Shahdadkot	PS-17 Qambar Shahdadkot-IV	NA-197 Qambar Shahdadkot-II
Sukkur	Ghotki	PS-18 Ghotki-I	NA-198 Ghotki-I
Sukkur	Ghotki	PS-19 Ghotki-II	NA-198 Ghotki-I
Sukkur	Ghotki	PS-20 Ghotki-III	NA-199 Ghotki-II
Sukkur	Ghotki	PS-21 Ghotki-IV	NA-199 Ghotki-II
Sukkur	Sukkur	PS-24 Sukkur-III	NA-200 Sukkur-I
Sukkur	Sukkur	PS-25 Sukkur-IV	NA-200 Sukkur-I
Sukkur	Sukkur	PS-22 Sukkur-I	NA-201 Sukkur-II
Sukkur	Sukkur	PS-23 Sukkur-II	NA-201 Sukkur-II
Sukkur	Khairpur	PS-26 Khairpur-I	NA-202 Khairpur-I
Sukkur	Khairpur	PS-27 Khairpur-II	NA-202 Khairpur-I
Sukkur	Khairpur	PS-28 Khairpur-III	NA-203 Khairpur-II
Sukkur	Khairpur	PS-29 Khairpur-IV	NA-203 Khairpur-II
Sukkur	Khairpur	PS-30 Khairpur-V	NA-204 Khairpur-III
Sukkur	Khairpur	PS-31 Khairpur-VI	NA-204 Khairpur-III
Nawabshah	Naushahro Feroze	PS-32 Naushahro Feroze-I	NA-205 Naushahro Feroze-I
Nawabshah	Naushahro Feroze	PS-33 Naushahro Feroze-II	NA-205 Naushahro Feroze-I
Nawabshah	Naushahro Feroze	PS-34 Naushahro Feroze-III	NA-206 Naushahro Feroze-II
Nawabshah	Naushahro Feroze	PS-35 Naushahro Feroze-IV	NA-206 Naushahro Feroze-II
Nawabshah	Nawabshah	PS-36 Nawabshah-I	NA-207 Nawabshah-I
Nawabshah	Nawabshah	PS-37 Nawabshah-II	NA-207 Nawabshah-I
Nawabshah	Nawabshah	PS-38 Nawabshah-III	NA-208 Nawabshah-II
Nawabshah	Nawabshah	PS-39 Nawabshah-IV	NA-208 Nawabshah-II
Nawabshah	Sanghar	PS-40 Sanghar-I	NA-209 Sanghar-I
Nawabshah	Sanghar	PS-41 Sanghar-II	NA-209 Sanghar-I
Nawabshah	Sanghar	PS-42 Sanghar-III	NA-209 Sanghar-I
Nawabshah	Sanghar	PS-43 Sanghar-IV	NA-210 Sanghar-II
Nawabshah	Sanghar	PS-44 Sanghar-V	NA-210 Sanghar-II
Mirpur Khas	Mirpur Khas	PS-45 Mirpur Khas-I	NA-211 Mirpur Khas-I
Mirpur Khas	Mirpur Khas	PS-46 Mirpur Khas-II	NA-211 Mirpur Khas-I
Mirpur Khas	Mirpur Khas	PS-47 Mirpur Khas-III	NA-212 Mirpur Khas-II
Mirpur Khas	Mirpur Khas	PS-48 Mirpur Khas-IV	NA-212 Mirpur Khas-II
Mirpur Khas	Umerkot	PS-49 Umerkot-I	NA-213 Umerkot
Mirpur Khas	Umerkot	PS-50 Umerkot-II	NA-213 Umerkot
Mirpur Khas	Umerkot	PS-51 Umerkot-III	NA-213 Umerkot
Mirpur Khas	Tharparkar	PS-52 Tharparkar-I	NA-214 Tharparkar-I
Mirpur Khas	Tharparkar	PS-53 Tharparkar-II	NA-214 Tharparkar-I
Mirpur Khas	Tharparkar	PS-54 Tharparkar-III	NA-215 Tharparkar-II
Mirpur Khas	Tharparkar	PS-55 Tharparkar-IV	NA-215 Tharparkar-II
Hyderabad	Matiari	PS-56 Matiari-I	NA-216 Matiari
Hyderabad	Matiari	PS-57 Matiari-II	NA-216 Matiari
Hyderabad	Tando Allahyar	PS-58 Tando Allahyar-I	NA-217 Tando Allahyar
Hyderabad	Tando Allahyar	PS-59 Tando Allahyar-II	NA-217 Tando Allahyar
Hyderabad	Hyderabad	PS-60 Hyderabad-I	NA-218 Hyderabad-I
Hyderabad	Hyderabad	PS-61 Hyderabad-II	NA-218 Hyderabad-I
Hyderabad	Hyderabad	PS-62 Hyderabad-III	NA-219 Hyderabad-II
Hyderabad	Hyderabad	PS-63 Hyderabad-IV	NA-219 Hyderabad-II
Hyderabad	Hyderabad	PS-64 Hyderabad-V	NA-220 Hyderabad-III
Hyderabad	Hyderabad	PS-65 Hyderabad-VI	NA-220 Hyderabad-III
Hyderabad	Tando Muhammad Khan	PS-66 Tando Muhammad Khan-I	NA-221 Tando Muhammad Khan
Hyderabad	Tando Muhammad Khan	PS-67 Tando Muhammad Khan-II	NA-221 Tando Muhammad Khan
Hyderabad	Jamshoro	PS-77 Jamshoro-I	NA-226 Jamshoro
Hyderabad	Jamshoro	PS-78 Jamshoro-II	NA-226 Jamshoro
Hyderabad	Jamshoro	PS-79 Jamshoro-III	NA-226 Jamshoro
Hyderabad	Dadu	PS-80 Dadu-I	NA-227 Dadu-I
Hyderabad	Dadu	PS-81 Dadu-II	NA-227 Dadu-I
Hyderabad	Dadu	PS-82 Dadu-III	NA-228 Dadu-II
Hyderabad	Dadu	PS-83 Dadu-IV	NA-228 Dadu-II
Hyderabad	Badin	PS-68 Badin-I	NA-222 Badin-I
Hyderabad	Badin	PS-69 Badin-II	NA-222 Badin-I
Hyderabad	Badin	PS-70 Badin-III	NA-222 Badin-I
Hyderabad	Badin	PS-70 Badin-III	NA-223 Badin-II
Hyderabad	Badin	PS-71 Badin-IV	NA-223 Badin-II
Hyderabad	Badin	PS-72 Badin-V	NA-223 Badin-II
Hyderabad	Sujawal	PS-73 Sujawal-I	NA-224 Sujawal
Hyderabad	Sujawal	PS-74 Sujawal-II	NA-224 Sujawal
Hyderabad	Thatta	PS-75 Thatta-I	NA-225 Thatta
Hyderabad	Thatta	PS-76 Thatta-II	NA-225 Thatta
Karachi	Malir	PS-84 Karachi Malir-I	NA-229 Karachi Malir-I
Karachi	Malir	PS-85 Karachi Malir-II	NA-229 Karachi Malir-I
Karachi	Malir	PS-86 Karachi Malir-III	NA-230 Karachi Malir-II
Karachi	Malir	PS-87 Karachi Malir-IV	NA-230 Karachi Malir-II
Karachi	Malir	PS-88 Karachi Malir-V	NA-231 Karachi Malir-III
Karachi	Malir	PS-89 Karachi Malir-VI	NA-231 Karachi Malir-III
Karachi	Korangi	PS-90 Karachi Korangi-I	NA-232 Karachi Korangi-I
Karachi	Korangi	PS-91 Karachi Korangi-II	NA-232 Karachi Korangi-I
Karachi	Korangi	PS-92 Karachi Korangi-III	NA-233 Karachi Korangi-II
Karachi	Korangi	PS-93 Karachi Korangi-IV	NA-233 Karachi Korangi-II
Karachi	Korangi	PS-94 Karachi Korangi-V	NA-233 Karachi Korangi-II
Karachi	Korangi	PS-95 Karachi Korangi-VI	NA-234 Karachi Korangi-III
Karachi	Korangi	PS-96 Karachi Korangi-VII	NA-234 Karachi Korangi-III
Karachi	Karachi East	PS-97 Karachi East-I	NA-235 Karachi East-I
Karachi	Karachi East	PS-98 Karachi East-II	NA-235 Karachi East-I
Karachi	Karachi East	PS-99 Karachi East-III	NA-236 Karachi East-II
Karachi	Karachi East	PS-100 Karachi East-IV	NA-236 Karachi East-II
Karachi	Karachi East	PS-103 Karachi East-VII	NA-237 Karachi East-III
Karachi	Karachi East	PS-104 Karachi East-VIII	NA-237 Karachi East-III
Karachi	Karachi East	PS-105 Karachi East-IX	NA-237 Karachi East-III
Karachi	Karachi East	PS-101 Karachi East-V	NA-238 Karachi East-IV
Karachi	Karachi East	PS-102 Karachi East-VI	NA-238 Karachi East-IV
Karachi	Karachi South	PS-106 Karachi South-I	NA-239 Karachi South-I
Karachi	Karachi South	PS-107 Karachi South-II	NA-239 Karachi South-I
Karachi	Karachi South	PS-107 Karachi South-II	NA-240 Karachi South-II
Karachi	Karachi South	PS-108 Karachi South-III	NA-240 Karachi South-II
Karachi	Karachi South	PS-109 Karachi South-IV	NA-241 Karachi South-III
Karachi	Karachi South	PS-110 Karachi South-V	NA-241 Karachi South-III
Karachi	Keamari	PS-112 Karachi Keamari-II	NA-242 Karachi Keamari-I
Karachi	Keamari	PS-113 Karachi Keamari-III	NA-242 Karachi Keamari-I
Karachi	Keamari	PS-114 Karachi Keamari-IV	NA-242 Karachi Keamari-I
Karachi	Keamari	PS-111 Karachi Keamari-I	NA-243 Karachi Keamari-II
Karachi	Keamari	PS-115 Karachi Keamari-V	NA-243 Karachi Keamari-II
Karachi	Karachi West	PS-116 Karachi West-I	NA-244 Karachi West-I
Karachi	Karachi West	PS-117 Karachi West-II	NA-244 Karachi West-I
Karachi	Karachi West	PS-118 Karachi West-III	NA-245 Karachi West-II
Karachi	Karachi West	PS-119 Karachi West-IV	NA-245 Karachi West-II
Karachi	Karachi West	PS-120 Karachi West-V	NA-246 Karachi West-III
Karachi	Karachi West	PS-121 Karachi West-VI	NA-246 Karachi West-III
Karachi	Karachi Central	PS-122 Karachi Central-I	NA-247 Karachi Central-I
Karachi	Karachi Central	PS-123 Karachi Central-II	NA-247 Karachi Central-I
Karachi	Karachi Central	PS-124 Karachi Central-III	NA-248 Karachi Central-II
Karachi	Karachi Central	PS-125 Karachi Central-IV	NA-248 Karachi Central-II
Karachi	Karachi Central	PS-126 Karachi Central-V	NA-248 Karachi Central-II
Karachi	Karachi Central	PS-127 Karachi Central-VI	NA-249 Karachi Central-III
Karachi	Karachi Central	PS-128 Karachi Central-VII	NA-249 Karachi Central-III
Karachi	Karachi Central	PS-129 Karachi Central-VIII	NA-250 Karachi Central-IV
Karachi	Karachi Central	PS-130 Karachi Central-IX	NA-250 Karachi Central-IV
Balochistan
Zhob	Sherani	PB-1 Sherani-Cum-Zhob	NA-251 Sherani-cum-Zhob-cum-Killa Saifullah
Zhob	Zhob	PB-1 Sherani-Cum-Zhob	NA-251 Sherani-cum-Zhob-cum-Killa Saifullah
Zhob	Zhob	PB-2 Zhob	NA-251 Sherani-cum-Zhob-cum-Killa Saifullah
Zhob	Killa Saifullah	PB-3 Killa Saifullah	NA-251 Sherani-cum-Zhob-cum-Killa Saifullah
Loralai	Musakhel	PB-4 Musakhel-cum-Barkhan	NA-252 Musakhel-cum-Barkhan-cum-Loralai-cum-Duki
Loralai	Barkhan	PB-4 Musakhel-cum-Barkhan	NA-252 Musakhel-cum-Barkhan-cum-Loralai-cum-Duki
Loralai	Loralai	PB-5 Loralai	NA-252 Musakhel-cum-Barkhan-cum-Loralai-cum-Duki
Loralai	Duki	PB-6 Duki	NA-252 Musakhel-cum-Barkhan-cum-Loralai-cum-Duki
Sibi	Ziarat	PB-7 Ziarat cum Harnai	NA-253 Ziarat-cum-Harnai-cum-Sibbi-cum-Kohlu-cum-Dera Bugti
Sibi	Harnai	PB-7 Ziarat cum Harnai	NA-253 Ziarat-cum-Harnai-cum-Sibbi-cum-Kohlu-cum-Dera Bugti
Sibi	Sibi	PB-8 Sibi	NA-253 Ziarat-cum-Harnai-cum-Sibbi-cum-Kohlu-cum-Dera Bugti
Sibi	Kohlu	PB-9 Kohlu	NA-253 Ziarat-cum-Harnai-cum-Sibbi-cum-Kohlu-cum-Dera Bugti
Sibi	Dera Bugti	PB-10 Dera Bugti	NA-253 Ziarat-cum-Harnai-cum-Sibbi-cum-Kohlu-cum-Dera Bugti
Nasirabad	Jhal Magsi	PB-11 Jhal Magsi	NA-254 Nasirabad-cum-Kachhi-cum-Jhal Magsi
Nasirabad	Kachhi	PB-12 Kachhi	NA-254 Nasirabad-cum-Kachhi-cum-Jhal Magsi
Nasirabad	Nasirabad	PB-13 Nasirabad-I	NA-254 Nasirabad-cum-Kachhi-cum-Jhal Magsi
Nasirabad	Nasirabad	PB-14 Nasirabad-II	NA-254 Nasirabad-cum-Kachhi-cum-Jhal Magsi
Nasirabad	Sohbatpur	PB-15 Sohbatpur	NA-255 Sohbat Pur-cum-Jaffarabad-cum-Usta Muhammad-cum-Nasirabad
Nasirabad	Jafarabad	PB-16 Jafarabad	NA-255 Sohbat Pur-cum-Jaffarabad-cum-Usta Muhammad-cum-Nasirabad
Nasirabad	Usta Muhammad	PB-17 Usta Muhammad	NA-255 Sohbat Pur-cum-Jaffarabad-cum-Usta Muhammad-cum-Nasirabad
Kalat	Khuzdar	PB-18 Khuzdar-I	NA-256 Khuzdar
Kalat	Khuzdar	PB-19 Khuzdar-II	NA-256 Khuzdar
Kalat	Khuzdar	PB-20 Khuzdar-III	NA-256 Khuzdar
Kalat	Hub	PB-21 Hub	NA-257 Hub-cum-Lasbela-cum-Awaran
Kalat	Lasbela	PB-22 Lasbela	NA-257 Hub-cum-Lasbela-cum-Awaran
Kalat	Awaran	PB-23 Awaran	NA-257 Hub-cum-Lasbela-cum-Awaran
Kalat	Surab	PB-35 Surab	NA-261 Surab-cum-Kalat-cum-Mastung
Kalat	Kalat	PB-36 Kalat	NA-261 Surab-cum-Kalat-cum-Mastung
Kalat	Mastung	PB-37 Mastung	NA-261 Surab-cum-Kalat-cum-Mastung
Makran	Gwadar	PB-24 Gwadar	NA-259 Kech-cum-Gwadar
Makran	Kech	PB-25 Kech-I	NA-259 Kech-cum-Gwadar
Makran	Kech	PB-26 Kech-II	NA-259 Kech-cum-Gwadar
Makran	Kech	PB-27 Kech-III	NA-258 Panjgur-cum-Kech
Makran	Kech	PB-28 Kech-IV	NA-258 Panjgur-cum-Kech
Makran	Panjgur	PB-29 Panjgur-I	NA-258 Panjgur-cum-Kech
Makran	Panjgur	PB-30 Panjgur-II	NA-258 Panjgur-cum-Kech
Rakhshan	Washuk	PB-31 Washuk	NA-260 Chagai-cum-Nushki-cum-Kharan-cum-Washuk
Rakhshan	Chagai	PB-32 Chagai	NA-260 Chagai-cum-Nushki-cum-Kharan-cum-Washuk
Rakhshan	Kharan	PB-33 Kharan	NA-260 Chagai-cum-Nushki-cum-Kharan-cum-Washuk
Rakhshan	Nushki	PB-34 Nushki	NA-260 Chagai-cum-Nushki-cum-Kharan-cum-Washuk
Quetta	Quetta	PB-38 Quetta-I	NA-262 Quetta-I
Quetta	Quetta	PB-39 Quetta-II	NA-262 Quetta-I
Quetta	Quetta	PB-40 Quetta-III	NA-262 Quetta-I
Quetta	Quetta	PB-43 Quetta-VI	NA-263 Quetta-II
Quetta	Quetta	PB-44 Quetta-VII	NA-263 Quetta-II
Quetta	Quetta	PB-45 Quetta-VIII	NA-263 Quetta-II
Quetta	Quetta	PB-41 Quetta-IV	NA-264 Quetta-III
Quetta	Quetta	PB-42 Quetta-V	NA-264 Quetta-III
Quetta	Quetta	PB-46 Quetta-IX	NA-264 Quetta-III
Quetta	Pishin	PB-47 Pishin-I	NA-265 Pishin
Quetta	Pishin	PB-48 Pishin-II	NA-265 Pishin
Quetta	Pishin	PB-49 Pishin-II	NA-265 Pishin
Quetta	Killa Abdullah	PB-50 Killa Abdullah	NA-266 Killa Abdullah-cum-Chaman
Quetta	Chaman	PB-51 Chaman	NA-266 Killa Abdullah-cum-Chaman

== See also ==
- Member of the Provincial Assembly
- List of provincial governments of Pakistan
- Divisions of Pakistan
  - Divisions of Balochistan
  - Divisions of Khyber Pakhtunkhwa
  - Divisions of Punjab
  - Divisions of Sindh
  - Divisions of Azad Kashmir
  - Divisions of Gilgit-Baltistan
