= Gujranwala Division =

Coordinates: 32°27′N 74°08′E

- Division
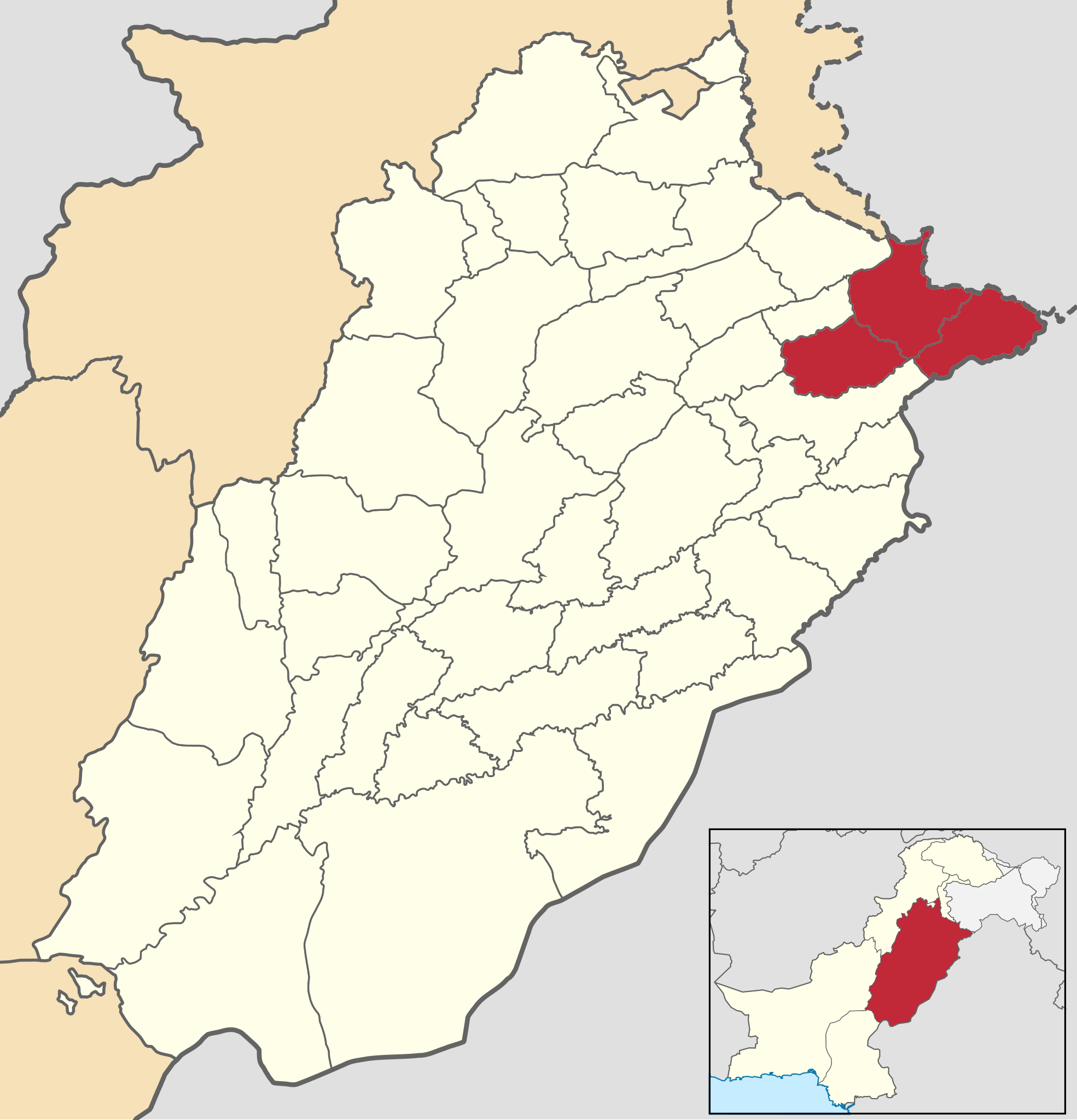
- Map of Gujranwala Division
- Country: Pakistan
- Province: (Punjab, Pakistan) Punjab
- Capital: Gujranwala

Government
  - Type: Divisional Administration
  - Commissioner: Naveed Haider Sherazi
  - Regional Police Officer: Dr. Haider Ashraf (Since January 2023)

Area
  - Division: 7,779 km^{2} (3,003 sq mi)

Population (2023)
  - Division: 11,416,686
  - Density: 1,468/km^{2} (3,801/sq mi)
  - Urban: 5,056,025 (44.20%)
  - Rural: 6,360,661 (55.80%)

Literacy (2023)
  - Literacy rate: Total: (76.41%); Male: (79.16%); Female: (73.61%)
- Website: gujranwaladivision.punjab.gov.pk

Gujranwala Division is an administrative division of Punjab province, Pakistan. The division, headquartered in the city of Gujranwala, consists of 3 districts covering a total area of 8,975 km^{2}.

Gujranwala division previously consisted of 7 districts but was divided into two divisions, Gujrat and Gujranwala.

== Demographics ==
According to the 2023 census, Gujranwala division had a population of 11,416,686, roughly equal to the nation of Jordan or the US state of Georgia. The literacy rate across the division stands at 76.41%, with males at 79.16% and females at 73.61%. Shown in the table below are the census figures since 1951 (the first census carried out after Pakistani independence) - the population has increased over sixfold between the 1951 and 2023 censuses.

Historical population
Year	Pop.	±% p.a.
1951	1,835,178	—
1961	2,587,061	+3.49%
1972	3,218,873	+2.01%
1981	3,934,861	+2.26%
1998	6,101,052	+2.61%
2017	9,783,183	+2.52%
2023	11,416,686	+2.61%
Sources: (Note: Due to Gujrat Division being split from Gujranwala in 2023, the total population in the census tables includes districts that are no longer a part of Gajranwala Division.)

== Geography ==
Gujranwala division shares borders with Gujrat division and Lahore division.

== List of the Districts ==
District	Headquarter	Area (km²)	Pop. (2023)	Density (ppl/km²) (2023)	Lit. rate (2023)
Sialkot	Sialkot	3,016	4,499,394	1,492.5	78.37%
Gujranwala	Gujranwala	2,426	4,966,338	2,045.4	76.77%
Narowal	Narowal	2,337	1,950,954	834.3	75.28%

== List of the Tehsils ==
Tehsil	Area (km²)	Pop. (2023)	Density (ppl/km²) (2023)	Lit. rate (2023)	Districts
Gujranwala City	131	2,511,118	19,168.84	79.39%	Gujranwala District
Gujranwala Saddar	783	1,133,101	1,447.13	75.71%	Gujranwala District
Kamoke	834	681,339	816.95	73.04%	Gujranwala District
Nowshera Virkan	678	640,780	945.10	71.36%	Gujranwala District
Shakargarh	835	769,339	921.36	76.28%	Narowal District
Narowal	1,065	680,402	638.88	76.78%	Narowal District
Zafarwal	437	501,213	1,146.94	71.72%	Narowal District
Pasrur	975	970,366	995.25	74.52%	Sialkot District
Daska	690	980,547	1,421.08	79.19%	Sialkot District
Sambrial	450	460,280	1,022.84	79.89%	Sialkot District
Sialkot	901	2,088,201	2,317.65	79.42%	Sialkot District
Total	7,779	11,416,686	_	_	

== List of the constituencies in National Assembly and Provincial Assembly ==
#	Provincial Assembly Constituency	National Assembly Constituency	District
1	PP-44 Sialkot-I	NA-70 Sialkot-I	Sialkot
2	PP-45 Sialkot-II	NA-70 Sialkot-I	Sialkot
3	PP-46 Sialkot-III	NA-71 Sialkot-II	Sialkot
4	PP-47 Sialkot-IV	NA-71 Sialkot-II	Sialkot
5	PP-48 Sialkot-V	NA-72 Sialkot-III	Sialkot
6	PP-49 Sialkot-VI	NA-72 Sialkot-III	Sialkot
7	PP-50 Sialkot-VII	NA-73 Sialkot-IV	Sialkot
8	PP-51 Sialkot-VIII	NA-73 Sialkot-IV	Sialkot
9	PP-52 Sialkot-IX	NA-74 Sialkot-V	Sialkot
10	PP-53 Sialkot-X	NA-74 Sialkot-V	Sialkot
11	PP-54 Narowal-I	NA-75 Narowal-I	Narowal
12	PP-55 Narowal-II	NA-75 Narowal-I	Narowal
13	PP-56 Narowal-III	NA-76 Narowal-II	Narowal
14	PP-57 Narowal-IV	NA-76 Narowal-II	Narowal
15	PP-58 Narowal-V	NA-76 Narowal-II	Narowal
16	PP-59 Gujranwala-I	NA-77 Gujranwala-I	Gujranwala
17	PP-70 Gujranwala-XII	NA-77 Gujranwala-I	Gujranwala
18	PP-60 Gujranwala-II	NA-78 Gujranwala-II	Gujranwala
19	PP-61 Gujranwala-III	NA-78 Gujranwala-II	Gujranwala
20	PP-65 Gujranwala-VII	NA-79 Gujranwala-III	Gujranwala
21	PP-66 Gujranwala-VIII	NA-79 Gujranwala-III	Gujranwala
22	PP-67 Gujranwala-IX	NA-79 Gujranwala-III	Gujranwala
23	PP-62 Gujranwala-IV	NA-80 Gujranwala-IV	Gujranwala
24	PP-63 Gujranwala-V	NA-80 Gujranwala-IV	Gujranwala
25	PP-64 Gujranwala-VI	NA-80 Gujranwala-IV	Gujranwala
26	PP-68 Gujranwala-X	NA-81 Gujranwala-V	Gujranwala
27	PP-69 Gujranwala-XI	NA-81 Gujranwala-V	Gujranwala

== See also ==
- Divisions of Pakistan
  - Divisions of Balochistan
  - Divisions of Khyber Pakhtunkhwa
  - Divisions of Punjab
  - Divisions of Sindh
  - Divisions of Azad Kashmir
  - Divisions of Gilgit-Baltistan
- Districts of Pakistan
  - Districts of Punjab, Pakistan
  - Districts of Sindh
  - Districts of Balochistan, Pakistan
  - Districts of Khyber Pakhtunkhwa
  - Districts of Azad Kashmir
  - Districts of Gilgit-Baltistan
