= Qaiser Iqbal Sindhu =

Pakistani politician

Member of the Provincial Assembly of the Punjab
- Incumbent
- Assumed office 24 February 2024
- Constituency: PP-66 Gujranwala-VIII
- In office 15 August 2018 – 14 January 2023
- Constituency: PP-60 Gujranwala-X
- In office June 2008 – 31 May 2018

Personal details
- Born: 31 December 1960 (age 65)
- Party: PMLN (2008-present)

Qaiser Iqbal Sindhu is a Pakistani politician who is a member of the Provincial Assembly of the Punjab since 23 February 2024 (18th Assembly). Previously, he was a member of the Provincial Assembly of the Punjab, from June 2008 to January 2023.

== Early life ==
Sindhu was born on 31 December 1960.

== Political career ==
Sindhu ran for the seat of the Provincial Assembly of the Punjab as an independent candidate for Constituency PP-99 (Gujranwala-IX) in the 2002 Pakistani general election, but was unsuccessful. He received 267 votes and defeated Sohail Zafar Cheema, a candidate of Pakistan Muslim League (Q) (PML-Q).

Sindhu was elected to the Provincial Assembly of the Punjab as a candidate for Pakistan Peoples Party for Constituency PP-99 (Gujranwala-IX) in by-polls held in June 2008. He received 33,943 votes and defeated Sohail Zafar Cheema, a candidate of PML-Q.

Sindhu was re-elected to the Provincial Assembly of the Punjab as a candidate of Pakistan Muslim League (N) (PML-N) from Constituency PP-99 (Gujranwala-IX) in the 2013 Pakistani general election.

He was re-elected to Provincial Assembly of the Punjab as a candidate of PML-N from Constituency PP-60 (Gujranwala-X) in the 2018 Pakistani general election.

He was re-elected to Provincial Assembly of the Punjab as a candidate of PML-N from Constituency PP-66 (Gujranwala-VIII) in the 2024 Pakistani general election.
