= Abdul Rauf Mughal =

Pakistani politician

Member of the Provincial Assembly of the Punjab
- In office 15 August 2018 – 14 January 2023
- Constituency: PP-58 Gujranwala-VIII
- In office 29 May 2013 – 31 May 2018

Personal details
- Born: 1 January 1947 (age 79) Gujranwala, Punjab, British India
- Party: PMLN (2013-present)

Abdul Rauf Mughal is a Pakistani politician who had been a Member of the Provincial Assembly of the Punjab from August 2018 till January 2023. Previously, he had been a Member of the Provincial Assembly of the Punjab, from 1993 to 1996 and again from May 2013 to May 2018.

== Early life and education ==
He was born on 1 January 1947 in Gujranwala.

He has completed intermediate level education.

== Political career ==
He was elected to the Provincial Assembly of the Punjab as a candidate of Pakistan Muslim League (N) (PML-N) from Constituency PP-88 (Gujranwala-XII) in the 1993 Pakistani general election. He received 30,531 votes and defeated Khalid Aziz Lone, a candidate of Pakistan Peoples Party (PPP).

He was re-elected to the Provincial Assembly of the Punjab as a candidate of PML-N from Constituency PP-88 (Gujranwala-XII) in the 1997 Pakistani general election. He received 30,594 votes and defeated Jamshed Ahmad Chaudhry, a candidate of PPP.

He was re-elected to the Provincial Assembly of the Punjab as a candidate of PML-N from Constituency PP-94 (Gujranwala-IV) in the 2013 Pakistani general election. He received 47,744 votes and defeated Khawaja Khalid Aziz Lone, a candidate of Pakistan Tehreek-e-Insaf (PTI).

He was re-elected to Provincial Assembly of the Punjab as a candidate of PML-N from Constituency PP-58 (Gujranwala-VIII) in the 2018 Pakistani general election. He received 44,232 votes defeating S.A Hameed.
