= Gujranwala Cantonment =

Army cantonment in Punjab, Pakistan

Gujranwala Cantonment گوجرانولہ کنٹونمنٹ
- Cantonment
- Interactive map of Gujranwala Cantonment
- Country: Pakistan
- Province: (Punjab, Pakistan) Punjab
- Division: Gujranwala
- District: Gujranwala
- Tehsil: Gujranwala Saddar

Government
  - Type: Cantonment Board
  - Body: Cantonment Board Gujranwala

Population (2023)
  - Total: 156,929

Gujranwala Cantonment (Urdu: گوجرانولہ کنٹونمنٹ) is a cantonment adjacent to Gujranwala in Punjab province, Pakistan. Gujranwala Cantonment has security checkpoints and barbed wire surrounding the cantonment.

== History ==
It was established in 1967. It replaced the village of Cheena Thatha, the only remains of which exist in the form of Thatha Cheena Graveyard located in the cantonment.

== Demographics ==
Population

Historical population
| Year | Pop. | ±% p.a. |
|---|---|---|
| 1972 | 36,598 | — |
| 1981 | 57,760 | +5.20% |
| 1998 | 93,093 | +2.85% |
| 2017 | 137,302 | +2.07% |
| 2023 | 156,929 | +2.25% |

According to 2023 census, Gujranwala Cantonment had a population of 156,929.

Languages

Languages of Gujranwala Cantonment (2023 Census)
1. Punjabi (80.3%)
2. Urdu (15.0%)
3. Pashto (1.60%)
4. Other (3.10%)
