= PP-59 Gujranwala-I =

Constituency of the Punjabi Provincial Legislature, Pakistan

- Constituency for the Provincial Assembly of Punjab
- Region: Gujranwala Saddar Tehsil (partly) including Gujranwala Cantonment (partly) and Ghakar City in Gujranwala District

Current constituency
- Created from: PP-96 Gujranwala-VI (2002–2018); PP-53 Gujranwala-III (2018-2023)

PP-59 Gujranwala-I (پی پی-59، گوجرانوالا-1) is a Constituency of Provincial Assembly of Punjab.

== General elections 2024 ==
Provincial election 2024: PP-59 Gujranwala-I
Party	Candidate	Votes	%	±%
Independent	Muhammad Nasir Cheema (Note: Filed nomination papers as PTI candidate but ECP allowed him to run as an Independent)	37,478	43.02	
PML(N)	Bilal Farooq Tarar	32,570	37.39	
TLP	Muhammad Masood Ahmad Mustafai	8,142	9.35	
PPP	Mian Saud Hassan Dar	3,532	4.05	
Others	Others (twenty four candidates)	5,395	6.19	
Turnout		89,297	45.97	
Total valid votes		87,117	97.56	
Rejected ballots		2,180	2.44	
Majority		4,908	5.63	
Registered electors		194,239		
hold				

== General elections 2018 ==
Provincial election 2018: PP-53 Gujranwala-III
Party	Candidate	Votes	%	±%
PML(N)	Bilal Farooq Tarar	47,337	47.19	
PTI	Jamal Nasir Cheema	35,045	34.93	
TLP	Sahibzada Nasir Ali	7,783	7.76	
Independent	Shoaib Mahmood	3,215	3.21	
AAT	Tepo Sultan Butt	2,425	2.42	
PPP	Mian Saud Hassan Dar	1,656	1.65	
Others	Others (twelve candidates)	2,861	2.84	
Turnout		102,736	52.97	
Total valid votes		100,322	97.65	
Rejected ballots		2,414	2.35	
Majority		12,292	12.26	
Registered electors		193,957		

== General elections 2013 ==
Provincial election 2013: PP-96 Gujranwala-VI
Party	Candidate	Votes	%	±%
PML(N)	Muhammad Taufeeq Butt	38,430	55.12	
PTI	Imran Yousaf Gujjar	13,878	19.90	
PPP	Rao Ikram Ali Khan	6,033	8.65	
Independent	Sheikh Mumtaz Ahmad	3,874	5.56	
Independent	Chaudhry Zahid Iqbal	2,043	2.93	
Independent	Ahsan Majeed Jathool	1,596	2.29	
Independent	Sheikh Nadeem Ahmed Hashmi	1,394	2.00	
JI	Muhammad Tariq Sheikh	1,341	1.92	
Others	Others (seventeen candidates)	1,137	1.63	
Turnout		71,452	50.21	
Total valid votes		69,726	97.58	
Rejected ballots		1,726	2.42	
Majority		24,552	35.22	
Registered electors		142,306		

== General elections 2008 ==
Provincial election 2008: PP-96 Gujranwala-VI
Party	Candidate	Votes	%	±%
PML(N)	Sh. Mumtaz Ahmad	22,945	47.30	
PPP	Ch. Muhammad Shabir Mehar	13,462	27.75	
PML(Q)	Eng. Muhammad Ashraf Abutt	7,325	15.10	
Independent	Shebaz Ali	4,179	8.62	
Others	Others	594	1.22	
Turnout		49,952	33.64	
Total valid votes		48,505	97.10	
Rejected ballots		1,447	2.90	
Majority		9,483	19.55	
Registered electors		148,502		

== See also ==
- PP-58 Narowal-V
- PP-60 Gujranwala-II
