= PP-65 Gujranwala-VII =

Constituency of the Provincial Assembly of Punjab, Pakistan

- Constituency for the Provincial Assembly of Punjab
- Region: Gujranwala Saddar Tehsil (partly) and Gujranwala City Tehsil (partly) in Gujranwala District

Current constituency
- Created from: PP-95 Gujranwala-V (2002–2018); PP-59 Gujranwala-IX (2018-2023)

PP-65 Gujranwala-VII (پی پی-65، گوجرانوالا-7) is a Constituency of Provincial Assembly of Punjab.

== General elections 2024 ==
Provincial election 2024: PP-65 Gujranwala-VII
Party	Candidate	Votes	%	±%
Independent	Hassan Ali (Note: Filed nomination papers as PTI candidate but ECP allowed him to run as an Independent)	36,499	37.91	
Independent	Chaudhary Waqar Ahmad Cheema	29,042	30.16	
PML(N)	Sahibzada Ghulam Fareed	17,934	18.63	
TLP	Rauf Mushtaq	4,349	4.52	
IPP	Sardar Haq Nawaz Cheema	2,621	2.72	
Others	Others (twenty three candidates)	5,845	6.06	
Turnout		99,601	47.49	
Total valid votes		96,290	96.68	
Rejected ballots		3,311	3.32	
Majority		7,457	7.75	
Registered electors		209,742		
hold				

== General elections 2018 ==
Provincial election 2018: PP-59 Gujranwala-IX
Party	Candidate	Votes	%	±%
PML(N)	Chaudhary Waqar Ahmad Cheema	40,062	44.47	
PTI	Sohail Zafar Cheema	20,532	22.79	
Independent	Nisar Iqbal	16,497	18.31	
Independent	Waleed Akram Bhinder	6,009	6.67	
TLP	Afzal Ahmad	4,045	4.49	
Others	Others (fifteen candidates)	2,945	3.27	
Turnout		93,366	53.26	
Total valid votes		90,090	96.49	
Rejected ballots		3,276	3.51	
Majority		19,530	21.68	
Registered electors		175,291		

== General elections 2013 ==
Provincial election 2013: PP-95 Gujranwala-V
Party	Candidate	Votes	%	±%
PML(N)	Pir Ghulam Fareed	47,126	48.42	
PTI	Dr. Sajjad Mahmood Dhariwal	14,704	15.11	
Independent	Fareed Iqbal Awan	8,947	9.19	
PPP	Mian Saud Hassan Dar	7,127	7.32	
Independent	Naseer Ahmad	7,018	7.21	
Independent	Saith Maqsood Ahmed Rehmani	5,504	5.66	
JI	Faroog Ahmed Khan Othi	2,839	2.92	
MDM	Rana Muhammad Ashraf	1,331	1.37	
Others	Others (seventeen candidates)	2,735	2.81	
Turnout		100,085	52.20	
Total valid votes		97,331	97.25	
Rejected ballots		2,754	2.75	
Majority		32,422	33.31	
Registered electors		191,729		

== General elections 2008 ==
Provincial election 2008: PP-95 Gujranwala-V
Party	Candidate	Votes	%	±%
PML(N)	Shazia Ashfaq Mattu	28,040	43.21	
PPP	Mian Saood Hasan Dar	21,879	33.72	
PML(Q)	Mian Sajjad Mehmood	12,398	19.11	
Independent	Mubashar Ahmad Cheema	2,235	3.44	
Others	Others	341	0.53	
Turnout		67,130	34.27	
Total valid votes		64,893	96.67	
Rejected ballots		2,237	3.33	
Majority		6,161	9.49	
Registered electors		195,867		

== See also ==
- PP-64 Gujranwala-VI
- PP-66 Gujranwala-VIII
