= PP-68 Gujranwala-X =

Constituency of the Punjabi Provincial Legislature, Pakistan

- Constituency for the Provincial Assembly of Punjab
- Region: Nowshera Virkan Tehsil (partly) and Gujranwala Saddar Tehsil (partly) in Gujranwala District

Current constituency
- Created from: PP-101 Gujranwala-XI (2002–2018); PP-63 Gujranwala-XIII (2018-2023)

PP-68 Gujranwala-X (پی پی-68، گوجرانوالا-10) is a Constituency of Provincial Assembly of Punjab.

== General elections 2024 ==
Provincial election 2024: PP-63 Gujranwala-V
Party	Candidate	Votes	%	±%
IND-PTI	Chaudhary Muhammad Tariq	51,181	45.34	
PML(N)	Muhammad Taufeeq Butt	43,693	38.71	
TLP	Haider Ali	6,797	6.02	
JI	Sajjad Ahmad	2,372	2.10	
PPP	Muhammad Faisal Iqbal	1,452	1.29	
PMML	Ajmal Ali	1,366	1.21	
Independent	Ikram Raza	1,159	1.03	
Others	Others	4,857	4.30	
Turnout		115,431	39.94	
Total valid votes		112,877	97.79	
Rejected ballots		2,554	2.21	
Majority		7,488	6.63	
Registered electors		289,030		

== General elections 2018 ==
Provincial election 2018: PP-63 Gujranwala-XIII
Party	Candidate	Votes	%	±%
PML(N)	Ch. Muhammad Iqbal Gujjar	30,477	31.14	
PTI	Rana Umar Nazir Khan	23,881	24.40	
Independent	Zulfiqar Butt	19,196	19.61	
AAT	Muhammad Younas	11,244	11.49	
TLP	Shahbaz Ahmed	6,593	6.74	
Independent	Ameer Hamza Virk	3,259	3.33	
Others	Others (nine candidates)	3,233	3.29	
Turnout		101,887	58.44	
Total valid votes		97,883	96.07	
Rejected ballots		4,004	3.93	
Majority		6,596	6.74	
Registered electors		174,344		

== General elections 2013 ==
Provincial election 2013: PP-101 Gujranwala-XI
Party	Candidate	Votes	%	±%
PML(N)	Riaz Bibi	24,430	27.03	
Independent	Khalid Pervaz Virk	21,191	23.45	
Independent	Muhammad Javed	15,476	17.13	
Independent	Imtiaz Ahmad Virk	10,248	11.34	
Independent	Gulbaz Ahmad	7,428	8.22	
PTI	Abid Sohail Virk	3,931	4.35	
PPP	Ch Muhammad Waris	2,487	2.75	
Independent	Jalil Ahmad Khan	2,169	2.40	
JI	Mazhar Iqbal	1,573	1.74	
Others	Others (nine candidates)	1,464	1.59	
Turnout		93,744	61.22	
Total valid votes		90,397	96.43	
Rejected ballots		3,347	3.57	
Majority		3,239	3.58	
Registered electors		153,138		

== General elections 2008 ==
Provincial election 2008: PP-101 Gujranwala-XI
Party	Candidate	Votes	%	±%
PML(Q)	Ch. Khalid Parvaiz Virk	26,885	37.67	
Independent	Ch. Amanaat Ali Virk	21,005	29.43	
Independent	Zuhair Zia Manj	16,079	22.53	
PPP	Sohail Ahmed Khan	7,247	10.15	
Independent	Rao Zahid Ali Khan	157	0.22	
Turnout		78,026	46.89	
Total valid votes		71,373	91.47	
Rejected ballots		6,653	8.53	
Majority		5,880	8.24	
Registered electors		166,414		

== See also ==
- PP-67 Gujranwala-IX
- PP-69 Gujranwala-XI
