= PP-69 Gujranwala-XI =

Constituency of the Punjabi Provincial Legislature, Pakistan

- Constituency for the Provincial Assembly of Punjab
- Region: Nowshera Virkan Tehsil and Gujranwala Saddar Tehsil (partly) including Qila Didar Singh Town in Gujranwala District

Current constituency
- Created from: PP-102 Gujranwala-XII (2002–2018); PP-64 Gujranwala-XIV (2018-2023)

PP-69 Gujranwala-XI (پی پی-69، گوجرانوالا-11) is a Constituency of Provincial Assembly of Punjab.

== General elections 2024 ==
Provincial election 2024: PP-69 Gujranwala-XI
Party	Candidate	Votes	%	±%
PML(N)	Ch Ali Jutt	47,902	37.43	
Independent	Umer Javed Virk	43,165	33.73	
Independent	Amar Ali Hussain Khan	15,581	12.18	
TLP	Chaudhary Hamid Nasir Sivia	11,667	9.12	
JI	Azhar Jahangir Khan	3,740	2.92	
Pakistan Muslim Markazi League	Sana Ullah	2,400	1.88	
Others	Others (eleven candidates)	3,513	2.74	
Turnout		131,203	52.26	
Total valid votes		127,968	97.53	
Rejected ballots		3,235	2.47	
Majority		4,737	3.70	
Registered electors		251,064		
hold				

== General elections 2018 ==
Provincial election 2018: PP-64 Gujranwala-XIV
Party	Candidate	Votes	%	±%
PML(N)	Irfan Bashir	46,756	40.37	
PTI	Khalid Pervaz Virk	39,163	33.81	
Independent	Ch. Rafaqat Hussain	12,721	10.98	
TLP	Ch. Hamid Nasir Swiya	9,728	8.40	
Independent	Muhammad Kamran	2,536	2.19	
AAT	Muhammad Nawaz Mallhi	1,743	1.51	
MMA	Muhammad Zaffar Iqbal	1,441	1.24	
Others	Others (ten candidates)	1,730	1.50	
Turnout		119,852	57.09	
Total valid votes		115,818	96.63	
Rejected ballots		4,034	3.37	
Majority		7,593	6.56	
Registered electors		209,929		

== General elections 2013 ==
Provincial election 2013: PP-102 Gujranwala-XII
Party	Candidate	Votes	%	±%
PML(N)	Ch.Rafaqat Hussain	30,452	34.38	
Independent	Ch. Irfan Bashir Gujjar	23,140	26.13	
Independent	Tanveer Azam Cheema	12,370	13.97	
Independent	Ch. Irshad Ullah	6,422	7.25	
Independent	Fazal Din	4,511	5.09	
Independent	Sardar Muhammad Tariq Raza	2,990	3.38	
PPP	Sarfraz Khan	2,644	2.99	
PTI	Muhammad Nawaz Malhi	1,449	1.64	
Independent	Hakim Ch Saif Ullah	1,130	1.28	
Others	Others (eleven candidates)	3,462	3.89	
Turnout		91,388	55.97	
Total valid votes		88,570	96.92	
Rejected ballots		2,818	3.08	
Majority		7,312	8.25	
Registered electors		163,278		

== General elections 2008 ==
Provincial election 2008: PP-102 Gujranwala-XII
Party	Candidate	Votes	%	±%
PML(Q)	Ch. Irfan Bashir Gujjar	26,992	34.80	
Independent	Ch. Rafaqat Hussain Gujjar	26,749	34.49	
PPP	Sarafraz Khan	20,317	26.19	
PML(N)	Rana Abdul Majid Khan	2,864	3.69	
Others	Others	644	0.83	
Turnout		79,928	49.10	
Total valid votes		77,566	97.04	
Rejected ballots		2,362	2.96	
Majority		243	0.31	
Registered electors		162,771		

== See also ==
- PP-68 Gujranwala-X
- PP-70 Gujranwala-XII
