= PP-60 Gujranwala-II =

Constituency of the Punjabi Provincial Legislature, Pakistan

- Constituency for the Provincial Assembly of Punjab
- Region: Gujranwala city area in Gujranwala District

Current constituency
- Created from: PP-91 Gujranwala-I (2002–2018); PP-58 Gujranwala-VIII (2018-2023)

PP-60 Gujranwala-II (پی پی-60، گوجرانوالا-2) is a Constituency of Provincial Assembly of Punjab.

== General elections 2024 ==
Provincial election 2024: PP-60 Gujranwala-II
Party	Candidate	Votes	%	±%
Independent	Kaleem Ullah Khan (Note: Filed nomination papers as PTI candidate but ECP allowed him to run as an Independent)	36,746	43.07	
PML(N)	Moazam Rauf Mughal	29,923	35.07	
TLP	Baseerat Ali Abid	6,432	7.54	
JI	Muhammad Yousaf Butt	2,799	3.28	
Independent	Aqeel Anwar Dar	2,401	2.81	
Others	Others (thirty four candidates)	7,026	8.23	
Turnout		87,484	39.50	
Total valid votes		85,327	97.53	
Rejected ballots		2,157	2.47	
Majority		6,823	8.00	
Registered electors		221,463		
hold				

== General elections 2018 ==
Provincial election 2018: PP-58 Gujranwala-VIII
Party	Candidate	Votes	%	±%
PML(N)	Abdul Rauf Mughal	44,237	45.97	
PTI	S. A. Hameed	28,528	29.65	
TLP	Tahir Naqash Khan	7,199	7.48	
Independent	Muhammad Mobeen Arif	5,712	5.94	
MMA	Muhammad Yousaf Butt	4,179	4.34	
AAT	Fahad Majeed	1,707	1.77	
Others	Others (eleven candidates)	4,668	4.85	
Turnout		98,762	49.18	
Total valid votes		96,230	97.44	
Rejected ballots		2,532	2.56	
Majority		15,709	16.32	
Registered electors		200,836		

== General elections 2013 ==
Provincial election 2013: PP-91 Gujranwala-I
Party	Candidate	Votes	%	±%
PML(N)	Imran Khalid Butt	34,075	42.55	
Independent	Rizwan Ullah Butt	24,636	30.76	
PTI	Jawad Hassan Manj	9,949	12.42	
PPP	Rana Faisal Rauf Khan	8,430	10.53	
Others	Others (twenty four candidates)	3,001	3.75	
Turnout		81,579	54.07	
Total valid votes		80,091	98.18	
Rejected ballots		1,488	1.82	
Majority		9,439	11.79	
Registered electors		150,891		

== General elections 2008 ==
Provincial election 2008: PP-91 Gujranwala-I
Party	Candidate	Votes	%	±%
PML(N)	Imran Khalid Butt	22,939	44.10	
PPP	Rana Faisal Rauf Khan	19,247	37.01	
Independent	Ch. Muhammad Ashraf Kamboh	5,754	11.06	
PML(Q)	Amir Farooq Khan	3,617	6.95	
Others	Others	454	0.87	
Turnout		52,938	33.63	
Total valid votes		52,011	98.25	
Rejected ballots		927	1.75	
Majority		3,692	7.09	
Registered electors		157,401		

== See also ==
- PP-59 Gujranwala-I
- PP-61 Gujranwala-III
