= PP-58 Narowal-V =

Constituency of the Provincial Assembly of Punjab, Pakistan

- Constituency for the Provincial Assembly of Punjab
- Region: Narowal Tehsil (partly) and Zafarwal Tehsil (partly) of Narowal District

Current constituency
- Created from: PP-135 Narowal-IV (2002-2018); PP-49 Narowal-IV (2018-2023)

PP-58 Narowal-V (پی پی-58، نارووال-5) is a Constituency of Provincial Assembly of Punjab.

== General elections 2024 ==
Provincial election 2024: PP-58 Narowal-V
Party	Candidate	Votes	%	±%
PML(N)	Bilal Akbar Khan	55,461	43.76	
Independent	Muhammad Irfan Abid (Note: Filed nomination papers as PTI candidate but ECP allowed him to run as an Independent)	45,909	36.22	
TLP	Rana Aman Ullah Khan	18,024	14.22	
Pakistan Muslim Markazi League	Hassan Din	2,055	1.62	
Others	Others (fourteen candidates)	5,298	4.18	
Turnout		130,026	52.02	
Total valid votes		126,747	97.48	
Rejected ballots		3,279	2.52	
Majority		9,552	7.54	
Registered electors		249,973		
hold				

== General elections 2018 ==
Provincial election 2018: PP-49 Narowal-IV
Party	Candidate	Votes	%	±%
PML(N)	Bilal Akbar Khan	44,192	41.55	
PTI	Riffat Javaid Kahloon	17,137	16.11	
TLP	Afzaal Ahmad	15,994	15.04	
Independent	Hassan Muhammad Wakeel Khan Manj	15,407	14.49	
Independent	Hafeez Anmed Khan	7,520	7.07	
AAT	Ghulam Mustafa	4,796	4.51	
Others	Others (four candidates)	1,314	1.25	
Turnout		110,930	57.67	
Total valid votes		106,360	95.88	
Rejected ballots		4,570	4.12	
Majority		27,055	25.44	
Registered electors		192,343		

== General elections 2013 ==
Provincial election 2013: PP-135 Narowal-IV
Party	Candidate	Votes	%	±%
PML(N)	Khawaja Muhammad Waseem	59,999	61.27	
PTI	Haji Muhammad Irfan Butt	30,260	30.90	
PPP	Zain-Ul- Hussnain Rizwi	3,914	4.00	
TTP	Anwar Hussain Shah	1,215	1.24	
Others	Others (ten candidates)	2,537	2.59	
Turnout		99,945	57.16	
Total valid votes		97,925	97.98	
Rejected ballots		2,020	2.02	
Majority		29,739	30.37	
Registered electors		174,838		

== General elections 2008 ==
Provincial election 2008: PP-135 Narowal-IV
Party	Candidate	Votes	%	±%
PML(N)	Samina Wasim Butt	42,787	61.86	
PML(Q)	Khizar Ilyas Virk	19,129	27.66	
PPP	Anwar-ul-Haq Ch.	6,252	9.04	
Independent	Rana Maqsood Ahmed	617	0.89	
Independent	Ch.Iftikhar Ali Shad	385	0.56	
Turnout		69,457	52.60	
Total valid votes		69,170	99.59	
Rejected ballots		287	0.41	
Majority		23,658	34.20	
Registered electors		132,052		

== See also ==
- PP-57 Narowal-IV
- PP-59 Gujranwala-I
