= PP-67 Gujranwala-IX =

Constituency of the Provincial Assembly of Punjab, Pakistan

- Constituency for the Provincial Assembly of Punjab
- Region: Kamoke Tehsil (partly) including Kamoke City in Gujranwala District

Current constituency
- Created from: PP-100 Gujranwala-X (2002–2018); PP-61 Gujranwala-XI (2018-2023)

PP-67 Gujranwala-IX (پی پی-67، گوجرانوالا-9) is a Constituency of Provincial Assembly of Punjab.

== General elections 2024 ==
Provincial election 2024: PP-67 Gujranwala-IX
Party	Candidate	Votes	%	±%
PML(N)	Akhtar Ali Khan	39,834	35.75	
Independent	Ch Ali Wakeel Khan (Note: Filed nomination papers as PTI candidate but ECP allowed him to run as an Independent)	32,762	29.40	
TLP	Abdul Qadir Gill	18,048	16.20	
Pakistan Muslim Markazi League	Muhammad Rafique	8,581	7.70	
IPP	Muhammad Naeem	5,518	4.95	
Others	Others (twenty two candidates)	6,680	6.00	
Turnout		114,280	47.93	
Total valid votes		111,423	97.50	
Rejected ballots		2,857	2.50	
Majority		7,072	6.35	
Registered electors		238,874		
hold				

== General elections 2018 ==
Provincial election 2018: PP-61 Gujranwala-XI
Party	Candidate	Votes	%	±%
PML(N)	Akhtar Ali Khan	44,936	47.14	
PTI	Ehsan Ullah Virk	29,319	30.76	
TLP	Muhammad Yasir Arfat Ramay	18,412	19.32	
PPP	Rana Muhammad Shahbaz	1,812	1.90	
Others	Others (seven candidates)	841	0.88	
Turnout		98,181	54.25	
Total valid votes		95,320	97.09	
Rejected ballots		2,861	2.91	
Majority		15,617	16.38	
Registered electors		180,991		

== General elections 2013 ==
Provincial election 2013: PP-100 Gujranwala-X
Party	Candidate	Votes	%	±%
PML(N)	Ch. Shamshad Ahmad Khan	54,118	57.91	
PTI	Muhammad Yasir Arfat Ramay	14,618	15.64	
PPP	Muhammad Asghar	9,033	9.67	
Independent	Muhammad Rafique Virk	6,505	6.96	
Independent	Haji Nazir Anmad Insari	4,916	5.26	
Others	Others (twenty candidates)	4,259	4.56	
Turnout		97,022	59.99	
Total valid votes		93,449	96.32	
Rejected ballots		3,573	3.68	
Majority		39,500	42.27	
Registered electors		161,732		

== General elections 2008 ==
Provincial election 2008: PP-100 Gujranwala-X
Party	Candidate	Votes	%	±%
PPP	Zulfiqar Ali Bhindar	32,177	47.28	
PML(Q)	Ch. Shamshad Ahmad Khan	21,638	31.79	
PML(N)	Syed Khalil-ur-Rehman Chishti	13,800	20.28	
Others	Others	443	0.65	
Turnout		70,891	41.72	
Total valid votes		68,058	96.00	
Rejected ballots		2,833	4.00	
Majority		10,539	15.49	
Registered electors		169,907		

== See also ==
- PP-66 Gujranwala-VIII
- PP-68 Gujranwala-X
