= PP-64 Gujranwala-VI =

Constituency of the Punjabi Provincial Legislature, Pakistan

PP-64 Gujranwala-VI Majore Nabeel Anwar Cheema
- Constituency for the Provincial Assembly of Punjab
- Region: Gujranwala city area in Gujranwala District

Current constituency
- Created from: PP-93 Gujranwala-III (2002–2018); PP-57 Gujranwala-VII (2018-2023)

PP-64 Gujranwala-VI (پی پی-64، گوجرانوالا-6) is a Constituency of Provincial Assembly of Punjab.

== General elections 2024 ==
Provincial election 2024: PP-64 Gujranwala-VI
Party	Candidate	Votes	%	±%
PML(N)	Umar Farooq Dar	37,115	39.76	
Independent	Chaudhary Muhammad Ali (Note: Filed nomination papers as PTI candidate but ECP allowed him to run as an Independent)	33,374	35.75	
TLP	Muhammad Asim	9,691	10.38	
Independent	Haleem Akhtar	3,092	3.31	
PPP	Muhammad Arslan	2,806	3.01	
JI	Muhammad Furqan Aziz Butt	2,130	2.28	
Others	Others (twenty candidates)	5,148	5.51	
Turnout		95,636	39.12	
Total valid votes		93,356	97.62	
Rejected ballots		2,280	2.38	
Majority		3,741	4.01	
Registered electors		244,440		
hold				

== General elections 2018 ==
Provincial election 2018: PP-57 Gujranwala-VII
Party	Candidate	Votes	%	±%
PML(N)	Chaudhary Ashraf Ali	56,512	46.41	
PTI	Asad Ullah	40,720	33.44	
Independent	Muhammad Umar	6,330	5.20	
TLP	Muhammad Akbar	6,226	5.11	
TLI	Muhammad Faiz Sultan	3,426	2.81	
AAT	Aqeel Anwar Dar	2,683	2.20	
MMA	Mushtaq Ahmad	2,190	1.80	
Others	Others (seventeen candidates)	3,684	3.03	
Turnout		124,384	50.33	
Total valid votes		121,771	97.90	
Rejected ballots		2,613	2.10	
Majority		15,792	12.97	
Registered electors		247,160		

== General elections 2013 ==
Provincial election 2013: PP-93 Gujranwala-III
Party	Candidate	Votes	%	±%
PML(N)	Ch. Ashraf Ali Ansari	47,033	64.36	
PTI	Ch. Muhammad Ali	10,254	14.03	
PPP	Ch. Muhammad Tariq Gujar	8,676	11.87	
JI	Ch. Shahid Munir Gondal	4,854	6.64	
PST	Muhammad Ikram Babar Khokhar	1,150	1.57	
Others	Others (fourteen candidates)	1,104	1.51	
Turnout		74,526	52.68	
Total valid votes		73,075	98.05	
Rejected ballots		1,451	1.95	
Majority		36,779	50.38	
Registered electors		141,474		

== General elections 2008 ==
Provincial election 2008: PP-93 Gujranwala-III
Party	Candidate	Votes	%	±%
PPP	Ch. Muhammad Tariq Gujjar	19,457	43.57	
PML(N)	Ch. Ashraf Ali Ansarai	19,302	43.22	
PML(Q)	Lala Zahid Usman Ansari	4,643	10.40	
Others	Others	1,259	2.82	
Turnout		45,823	28.69	
Total valid votes		44,661	97.46	
Rejected ballots		1,162	2.54	
Majority		155	0.35	
Registered electors		159,698		

== See also ==
- PP-63 Gujranwala-V
- PP-65 Gujranwala-VII
