= PP-62 Gujranwala-IV =

Constituency of the Punjabi Provincial Legislature, Pakistan

- Constituency for the Provincial Assembly of Punjab
- Region: Gujranwala city area in Gujranwala District

Current constituency
- Created: 2002
- Created from: PP-98 Gujranwala-VIII (2002–2018); PP-55 Gujranwala-V (2018-2023)

PP-62 Gujranwala-IV (پی پی-62، گوجرانوالا-4) is a constituency of the Provincial Assembly of Punjab.

== General elections 2024 ==
Provincial election 2024: PP-62 Gujranwala-IV
Party	Candidate	Votes	%	±%
PML(N)	Muhammad Nawaz Chohan	30,596	37.28	
Independent	Rizwan Mustafa Sian (Note: Filed nomination papers as PTI candidate but ECP allowed him to run as an Independent)	26,087	31.79	
TLP	Muhammad Saleem Ullah	7,097	8.65	
Independent	Muhammad Afzal	5,253	6.40	
JI	Faiz UI Haq	3,280	4.00	
Pakistan Muslim Markazi League	Shoukat Ali Virk	2,430	2.96	
Others	Others (forty candidates)	7,318	8.92	
Turnout		84,329	41.53	
Total valid votes		82,061	97.31	
Rejected ballots		2,268	2.69	
Majority		4,509	5.49	
Registered electors		203,059		
hold				

== General elections 2018 ==
Provincial election 2018: PP-55 Gujranwala-V
Party	Candidate	Votes	%	±%
PML(N)	Muhammad Nawaz Chohan	36,882	46.94	
PTI	Muhammad Arqam Khan	22,594	28.76	
Independent	Mahboob Alam	9,189	11.70	
TLI	Chaudhry Muhammad Saqib	3,720	4.73	
MMA	Muhammad Yaseen	2,442	3.11	
TLP	Rehan	1,332	1.70	
Others	Others (thirteen candidates)	2,514	3.06	
Turnout		80,954	54.27	
Total valid votes		78,574	97.06	
Rejected ballots		2,380	2.94	
Majority		14,288	18.18	
Registered electors		149,173		

== General elections 2013 ==
Provincial election 2013: PP-98 Gujranwala-VIII
Party	Candidate	Votes	%	±%
PML(N)	Chaudhary Muhammad Iqbal	55,769	54.45	
PTI	Chaudhary Muhammad Younas Mehar	16,659	16.27	
PPP	Mohammad Arqam Khan	16,061	15.68	
PML(J)	Hafiz Muhammad Adnan Waris	8,805	8.60	
TTP	Sardar Kamal Din Dogar	1,887	1.84	
Others	Others (sixteen candidates)	3,241	3.16	
Turnout		105,877	70.00	
Total valid votes		102,422	96.74	
Rejected ballots		3,455	3.26	
Majority		39,110	38.18	
Registered electors		151,246		

== General elections 2008 ==
Provincial election 2008: PP-98 Gujranwala-VIII
Party	Candidate	Votes	%	±%
PPP	Muhammad Arqam Khan	36,382	50.17	
PML(Q)	Ch. Muhammad Iqbal	22,733	31.35	
PML(N)	Ch. Hameed Naseem Cheema	12,627	17.41	
Others	Others	775	1.07	
Turnout		74,456	41.04	
Total valid votes		72,517	97.40	
Rejected ballots		1,939	2.60	
Majority		13,649	18.82	
Registered electors		181,413		

== See also ==
- PP-61 Gujranwala-III
- PP-63 Gujranwala-V
