= PP-61 Gujranwala-III =

Constituency of the Punjabi Provincial Legislature, Pakistan

- Constituency for the Provincial Assembly of Punjab
- Region: Gujranwala city area in Gujranwala District

Current constituency
- Created from: PP-92 Gujranwala-II (2002–2018); PP-54 Gujranwala-IV (2018-2023)

PP-61 Gujranwala-III (پی پی-61، گوجرانوالا-3) is a Constituency of Provincial Assembly of Punjab.

== General elections 2024 ==
Provincial election 2024: PP-61 Gujranwala-III
Party	Candidate	Votes	%	±%
PML(N)	Imran Khalid Butt	35,559	36.44	
Independent	Rizwan Ullah Butt	30,111	30.85	
Independent	Tahir Majeed Khan (Note: Filed nomination papers as PTI candidate but ECP allowed him to run as an Independent)	19,786	17.20	
TLP	Aqeel Ismail	5,160	5.29	
JI	Muhammad Aniq Hassan Randhawa	4,186	4.29	
PPP	Khalid Hussain	2,009	2.06	
Others	Others (twenty candidates)	3,786	3.87	
Turnout		99,670	42.41	
Total valid votes		97,597	97.92	
Rejected ballots		2,073	2.08	
Majority		5,448	5.59	
Registered electors		235,024		
hold				

== General elections 2018 ==
Provincial election 2018: PP-54 Gujranwala-IV
Party	Candidate	Votes	%	±%
PML(N)	Imran Khalid Butt	50,987	45.74	
PTI	Rizwan Ullah Butt	49,635	44.53	
AAT	Abdul Rehman Butt	3,297	2.96	
TLI	Muhammad Naeem	2,433	2.18	
TLP	Khawaja Amjad Rathore	1,319	1.18	
Others	Others (eleven candidates)	3,797	3.41	
Turnout		114,230	52.57	
Total valid votes		111,468	97.58	
Rejected ballots		2,762	2.42	
Majority		1,352	1.21	
Registered electors		217,313		

== General elections 2013 ==
Provincial election 2013: PP-92 Gujranwala-II
Party	Candidate	Votes	%	±%
PML(N)	Muhammad Nawaz Chohan	55,559	64.13	
PTI	Mehar Mohammad Sarfraz	12,553	14.49	
PPP	Lala Shakeel Ur Rehman	8,937	10.32	
JI	Muhammad Rizwan Cheema	6,593	7.61	
Others	Others (twenty candidates)	2,997	3.46	
Turnout		88,161	51.71	
Total valid votes		86,639	98.27	
Rejected ballots		1,522	1.73	
Majority		43,006	49.64	
Registered electors		170,491		

== General elections 2008 ==
Provincial election 2008: PP-92 Gujranwala-II
Party	Candidate	Votes	%	±%
PML(N)	Dr. Muhammad Ashraf Chohan	24,632	44.05	
PPP	Lala Shakeel-ur-Rehman	23,892	42.73	
PML(Q)	Asif Iqbal	6,019	10.76	
Markazi Jamiat Ahle Hadith	Hasham Elahi Zaheer	926	1.66	
Others	Others	445	0.80	
Turnout		56,997	33.27	
Total valid votes		55,914	98.10	
Rejected ballots		1,083	1.90	
Majority		740	1.32	
Registered electors		171,310		

== See also ==
- PP-60 Gujranwala-II
- PP-62 Gujranwala-IV
