= PP-66 Gujranwala-VIII =

Constituency of the Punjabi Provincial Legislature, Pakistan

- Constituency for the Provincial Assembly of Punjab
- Region: Gujranwala Saddar Tehsil (partly) including Eminabad Town and Kamoke Tehsil (partly) in Gujranwala District

Current constituency
- Member: Vacant
- Created from: PP-99 Gujranwala-IX (2002–2018); PP-60 Gujranwala-X (2018-2023)

PP-66 Gujranwala-VIII (پی پی-66، گوجرانوالا-8) is a Constituency of Provincial Assembly of Punjab.

== General elections 2024 ==
Provincial election 2024: PP-66 Gujranwala-VIII
Party	Candidate	Votes	%	±%
PML(N)	Qaiser Iqbal	48,439	37.14	
Independent	Rizwan Zafar Cheema (Note: Filed nomination papers as PTI candidate but ECP allowed him to run as an Independent)	44,342	34.00	
TLP	Naseer Ahmad	9,569	7.34	
Independent	Raza Miran	8,436	6.47	
Pakistan Muslim Markazi League	Abdul Sattar	6,424	4.93	
IPP	Rana Nazir Ahmad Khan	2,838	2.18	
Others	Others (twenty three candidates)	10,375	7.94	
Turnout		134,233	53.25	
Total valid votes		130,423	97.16	
Rejected ballots		3,810	2.84	
Majority		4,097	3.14	
Registered electors		252,095		
hold				

== General elections 2018 ==
Provincial election 2018: PP-60 Gujranwala-X
Party	Candidate	Votes	%	±%
PML(N)	Qaiser Iqbal	39,828	36.06	
PTI	Chaudhary Zaffar Ullah Cheema	30,022	27.18	
Independent	Ch. Ali Wakeel Khan	21,073	19.08	
AAT	Hafiz Muhammad Adnan Waris	8,679	7.86	
TLP	Muhammad Rashid Naveed	5,531	5.01	
PPP	Latif Asghar Khan	2,632	2.38	
Others	Others (ten candidates)	2,701	2.43	
Turnout		114,171	56.90	
Total valid votes		110,466	96.76	
Rejected ballots		3,705	3.24	
Majority		9,806	8.88	
Registered electors		200,637		

== General elections 2013 ==
Provincial election 2013: PP-99 Gujranwala-IX
Party	Candidate	Votes	%	±%
PML(N)	Qaiser Iqbal	33,469	38.88	
PML(Q)	Dr. Sohail Zafar Cheema	25,712	29.87	
Independent	Nisar Iqbal	15,899	18.47	
PTI	Ch. Qamar Ul Zaman	3,820	4.44	
Independent	Muhammad Naseer Ahmad Chattha	1,957	2.27	
JI	Abdul Hameed	1,864	2.17	
MDM	Ghazi UI Din	1,602	1.86	
Others	Others (twelve candidates)	1,770	2.04	
Turnout		88,926	49.22	
Total valid votes		86,093	96.81	
Rejected ballots		2,833	3.19	
Majority		7,757	9.01	
Registered electors		180,686		

== General elections 2008 ==
Provincial election 2008: PP-99 Gujranwala-IX
Party	Candidate	Votes	%	±%
PPP	Qaiser Iqbal Sandhu	33,943	63.82	
PML(Q)	Doctor Sohail Zafar Cheema	12,272	23.07	
Independent	Athar Hassan Sultan	3,554	6.68	
Independent	Chaudhary Zafar Gulzar Ahmed Khan	1,940	3.65	
Others	Others	1,477	2.78	
Turnout		53,716	31.20	
Total valid votes		53,186	99.01	
Rejected ballots		530	0.99	
Majority		21,671	40.75	
Registered electors		172,147		

== See also ==
- PP-65 Gujranwala-VII
- PP-67 Gujranwala-IX
