= PP-63 Gujranwala-V =

Constituency of the Provincial Assembly of Punjab, Pakistan

- Constituency for the Provincial Assembly of Punjab
- Region: Gujranwala city area in Gujranwala District

Current constituency
- Created from: PP-94 Gujranwala-IV (2002–2018); PP-56 Gujranwala-VI (2018-2023)

PP-63 Gujranwala-V (پی پی-63، گوجرانوالا-5) is a Constituency of Provincial Assembly of Punjab in Pakistan.

== General elections 2024 ==
Provincial election 2024: PP-63 Gujranwala-V
Party	Candidate	Votes	%	±%
Independent	Chaudhary Muhammad Tariq (Note: Filed nomination papers as PTI candidate but ECP allowed him to run as an Independent)	51,181	45.34	
PML(N)	Muhammad Taufeeq Butt	43,693	38.71	
TLP	Haider Ali	6,797	6.02	
JI	Sajjad Ahmad	2,372	2.10	
Others	Others (thirty candidates)	8,834	7.83	
Turnout		115,431	39.94	
Total valid votes		112,877	97.79	
Rejected ballots		2,554	2.21	
Majority		7,488	6.63	
Registered electors		289,030		
hold				

== General elections 2018 ==
Provincial election 2018: PP-56 Gujranwala-VI
Party	Candidate	Votes	%	±%
PML(N)	Muhammad Toufeeq Butt	47,387	52.96	
PTI	Chaudhry Muhammad Tariq	29,113	32.54	
TLP	Zahid Anwar Bhatti	4,734	5.29	
TLI	Muhammad Ikram	3,317	3.71	
PPP	Muhammad Ashfaq	3,213	3.59	
Others	Others (thirteen candidates)	1,714	1.91	
Turnout		92,012	51.65	
Total valid votes		89,478	97.25	
Rejected ballots		2,534	2.75	
Majority		18,274	20.42	
Registered electors		178,136		

== General elections 2013 ==
Provincial election 2013 : PP-94 Gujranwala-IV
Party	Candidate	Votes	%	±%
PML(N)	Abdul Rauf Mughal	47,744	58.52	
PTI	Khawaja Khalid Aziz Lone	16,951	20.78	
PML(Q)	Khawja Waqar Hassan	9,579	11.74	
JI	Muhammad Idrees Ayub Sheikh	2,889	3.54	
Independent	Muhammad Hamza Butt	2,101	2.58	
Others	Others (fifteen candidates)	2,318	2.84	
Turnout		83,011	50.31	
Total valid votes		81,582	98.28	
Rejected ballots		1,429	1.72	
Majority		30,793	37.74	
Registered electors		164,990		

== General elections 2008 ==
Provincial election 2008 : PP-94 Gujranwala-IV
Party	Candidate	Votes	%	±%
PML(N)	Muhammad Saeed Mughal	29,680	54.50	
PPP	Muhammad Tariq Ali	17,337	31.83	
PML(Q)	Khawaja Waqar Hassan	6,710	12.32	
Others	Others	732	1.34	
Turnout		55,630	30.01	
Total valid votes		54,459	97.90	
Rejected ballots		1,171	2.10	
Majority		12,343	22.67	
Registered electors		185,392		

== See also ==
- PP-62 Gujranwala-IV
- PP-64 Gujranwala-VI
