= Gujranwala Saddar Tehsil =

Gujranwala Saddar Tehsil in Punjab, Pakistan

Gujranwala Saddar Tehsil تحصیل گوجرانوالہ صدر تحصیل گجرانوالا صدر
- Tehsil
- Country: Pakistan
- Subdivisions of Pakistan: (Punjab, Pakistan) Punjab
- District: Gujranwala District

Area
  - Tehsil: 783 km^{2} (302 sq mi)

Population (2023 Census of Pakistan)
  - Tehsil: 1,133,101
  - Density: 1,450/km^{2} (3,750/sq mi)
  - Urban: 362,182 (31.96%)
  - Rural: 770,919 (68.04%)
- Time zone: UTC+5 (PST)
  - Summer (DST): UTC+6 (PDT)

Gujranwala Saddar is a tehsil of Gujranwala District, Punjab, Pakistan.

== Demographics ==
=== Population ===
Historical population
Year	Pop.	±% p.a.
1951	...	—
1961	...	—
1972	...	—
1981	...	—
1998	...	—
2017	963,982	—
2023	1,133,101	+2.73%

As of the 2023 census, Gujranwala Saddar Tehsil has a population of 1,133,101, with 362,182 residing in urban areas and 770,919 in rural areas. The average annual growth rate from 2017 to 2023 is 1.92%, and the average household size is 6.44. The tehsil includes several urban localities, such as Qila Didar Singh Municipal Committee, which has a population of 74,523 as of 2023. Overall, Gujranwala Saddar Tehsil encompasses an area of 783 square kilometers, resulting in a population density of approximately 1,447.13 people per square kilometer.

== See also ==
- Tehsils of Pakistan
  - Tehsils of Punjab, Pakistan
  - Tehsils of Balochistan
  - Tehsils of Khyber Pakhtunkhwa
  - Tehsils of Sindh
  - Tehsils of Azad Kashmir
  - Tehsils of Gilgit-Baltistan
