= List of members of the 16th Provincial Assembly of the Punjab =

The 16th Assembly of Punjab is the legislature of Punjab, Pakistan following the 2013 Punjab provincial election to the Provincial Assembly of the Punjab.

== Members ==
Constituency	Member	Party	Ref.
PP-262	Abdul Majeed Khan Niazi	Pakistan Tehreek-e-Insaf	
PP-1	Raja Ashfaq Sarwar	Pakistan Muslim League (N)	
PP-4	None		
PP-16	Jahangir Khanzada	Pakistan Muslim League (N)	
PP-20	None		
PP-88	Nazia Raheel	Pakistan Muslim League (N)	
PP-206	Naghma Mushtaq	Pakistan Muslim League (N)	
PP-34	Nadia Aziz	Pakistan Muslim League (N)	
PP-53	Iffat Miraj Awan	Pakistan Muslim League (N)	
PP-116	Hameeda Waheeduddin	Pakistan Muslim League (N)	
PP-107	Nighat Intisar Bhatti	Pakistan Tehreek-e-Insaf	
PP-101	Riaz Amanat Ali Virk	Pakistan Muslim League (N)	
PP-185	Samina Noor	Pakistan Muslim League (N)	
PP-30	Yasir Zafar Sindhu	Pakistan Muslim League (N)	
PP-45	Malik Ahmad Khan Bhachar	Pakistan Tehreek-e-Insaf	
PP-48	Inamullah Niazi	Independent	
PP-52	Chaudhry Muhammad Afzal Sahi	Pakistan Muslim League (N)	
PP-70	Rana Sanaullah Khan	Pakistan Muslim League (N)	
PP-73	Ilyas Chinioti	Pakistan Muslim League (N)	
PP-76	Saqlain Anwar Sipra	Pakistan Muslim League (N)	
PP-78	Masroor Nawaz Jhangvi	Jamiat Ulama-e-Islam (F)	
PP-98	Muhammad Iqbal Gujjar	Pakistan Muslim League (N)	
PP-110	Moonis Elahi	Pakistan Muslim League (Q)	
PP-114	Muhammad Hanif Malik	Pakistan Muslim League (N)	
PP-124	Rana Abdul Sattar	Pakistan Muslim League (N)	
PP-128	Rana Muhammad Afzal	Pakistan Muslim League (N)	
PP-139	Bilal Yasin	Pakistan Muslim League (N)	
PP-142	Khawaja Salman Rafique	Pakistan Muslim League (N)	
PP-148	Mian Muhammad Aslam Iqbal	Pakistan Tehreek-e-Insaf	
PP-149	Rana Mashood Ahmad Khan	Pakistan Muslim League (N)	
PP-150	Mian Marghoob Ahmad	Pakistan Muslim League (N)	
PP-151	Mehmood-ur-Rasheed	Pakistan Tehreek-e-Insaf	
PP-154	Zaeem Qadri	Pakistan Muslim League (N)	
PP-159	Shehbaz Sharif	Pakistan Muslim League (N)	
PP-183	Muhammad Asif Nakai	Pakistan Muslim League (Q)	
PP-184	Rana Muhammad Iqbal Khan (politician)	Pakistan Muslim League (N)	
PP-187	Syed Raza Ali Gillani	Pakistan Muslim League (N)	
PP-191	Mian Yawar Zaman	Pakistan Muslim League (N)	
PP-196	Rana Mahmood-ul-Hassan	Pakistan Muslim League (N)	
PP-214	Nishat Khan Daha	Pakistan Muslim League (N)	
PP-259	None		
PP-279	Rana Abdul Rauf	Pakistan Muslim League (N)	
PP-85	Abdul Qadeer Alvi	Pakistan Muslim League (N)	
PP-94	Abdul Rauf Mughal	Pakistan Muslim League (N)	
PP-218	Abdul Razzaq Khan	Independent	
PP-133	Abu Hafs Muhammad Ghiyas-ud-Din	Pakistan Muslim League (N)	
PP-243	Ahmad Ali Khan Dreshak	Pakistan Tehreek-e-Insaf	
PP-229	Ahmad Shah Khagga	Pakistan Muslim League (Q)	
PP-211	Ahmed Khan Baloch	Pakistan Muslim League (N)	
PP-103	Akmal Saif Chatha	Pakistan Muslim League (N)	
PP-165	Ali Asghar Manda	Pakistan Muslim League (N)	
PP-168	Ali Salman (politician)	Independent	
PP-43	Amanat Ullah Khan Shadi Khel	Pakistan Muslim League (N)	
PP-47	Ameer Muhammad Khan	Pakistan Muslim League (N)	
PP-216	Amir Hayat Hiraj	Pakistan Muslim League (N)	
PP-50	Amir Inayat Khan Shahani	Pakistan Muslim League (N)	
PP-59	Arif Mahmood Gill	Pakistan Muslim League (N)	
PP-9	Asif Mehmood	Pakistan Tehreek-e-Insaf	
PP-238	Asif Saeed Manais	Pakistan Muslim League (N)	
PP-132	Awais Qasim Khan	Pakistan Muslim League (N)	
PP-51	Azad Ali Tabassum	Pakistan Muslim League (N)	
PP-144	Bao Akhtar Ali	Pakistan Muslim League (N)	
PP-235	Bilal Akbar Bhatti	Pakistan Muslim League (N)	
PP-84	Bilal Asghar Warraich	Pakistan National Muslim League	
PP-131	Chaudhry Arshad Javaid Warraich	Pakistan Muslim League (N)	
PP-266	Chaudhry Ashfaq Ahmed	Pakistan Muslim League (N)	
PP-93	Chaudhry Ashraf Ali Ansari	Pakistan Muslim League (N)	
PP-67	Chaudhry Faqir Hussain Dogar	Pakistan Muslim League (N)	
PP-215	Chaudhry Fazal ur Rehman	Pakistan Muslim League (N)	
PP-188	Chaudhry Iftikhar Hussain Chhachhar	Pakistan Muslim League (N)	
PP-233	Chaudhry Irshad Ahmad Arain	Pakistan Muslim League (N)	
PP-275	Chaudhry Khalid Mehmood Jajja	Pakistan Muslim League (N)	
PP-129	Chaudhry Mohsin Ashraf	Pakistan Muslim League (N)	
PP-122	Chaudhry Muhammad Akram	Pakistan Muslim League (N)	
PP-225	Chaudhry Muhammad Arshad Jutt	Pakistan Muslim League (N)	
PP-112	Muhammad Ashraf (politician, born 1946)	Pakistan Muslim League (N)	
PP-226	Chaudhry Muhammad Hanif	Pakistan Muslim League (N)	
PP-296	Chaudhry Muhammad Shafique	Pakistan Muslim League (N)	
PP-232	Chaudhry Muhammad Yousaf Kaselya	Pakistan Muslim League (N)	
PP-102	Chaudhry Rafaqat Hussain Gujjar	Pakistan Muslim League (N)	
PP-62	Chaudhry Raza Nasrullah Ghumman	Pakistan Muslim League (N)	
PP-143	Chaudhry Shahbaz Ahmad	Pakistan Muslim League (N)	
PP-64	Chaudhry Zafar Iqbal Nagra	Pakistan Muslim League (N)	
PP-282	Chaudhry Zahid Akram	Pakistan Muslim League (N)	
PP-32	Chaudhry Aamir Sultan Cheema	Pakistan Muslim League (Q)	
PP-33	Chaudhry Abdul Razzaq Dhillon	Pakistan Muslim League (N)	
PP-118	Chaudhry Akhtar Abbas Bosal	Pakistan Muslim League (N)	
PP-100	Chaudhry Akhtar Ali Khan	Pakistan Muslim League (N)	
PP-86	Chaudhry Amjad Ali Javed	Pakistan Muslim League (N)	
PP-35	Chaudhry Faisal Farooq Cheema	Pakistan Muslim League (N)	
PP-26	Chaudhry Lal Hussain	Pakistan Muslim League (N)	
PP-294	Chaudhry Mahmood ul Hassan	Pakistan Muslim League (N)	
PP-106	Chaudhry Muhammad Asad Ullah	Pakistan Muslim League (N)	
PP-97	Chaudhry Muhammad Ashraf Warraich	Pakistan Muslim League (N)	
PP-293	Chaudhry Muhammad Omar Jaffar	Pakistan Muslim League (N)	
PP-156	Chaudhry Muhammad Yasien Sohl	Pakistan Muslim League (N)	
PP-27	Chaudhry Nazar Hussain	Pakistan Muslim League (N)	
PP-115	Chaudhry Shabbir Ahmed	Pakistan Muslim League (N)	
PP-170	Chaudhry Tariq Mehmood Bajwa	Pakistan Muslim League (N)	
PP-161	Chaudhary Gulzar Ahmed Gujjar	Pakistan Muslim League (N)	
PP-6	Chaudhary Sarfraz Afzal	Pakistan Muslim League (N)	
PP-58	Ehsan Riaz Fatyana	Independent	
PP-197	Ehsan ud Din Qureshi	Pakistan Muslim League (N)	
PP-5	Engineer Qamar ul Islam Raja	Pakistan Muslim League (N)	
PP-166	Faizan Khalid Virk	Pakistan Muslim League (N)	
PP-230	Farrukh Javed	Pakistan Muslim League (N)	
PP-138	Ghazali Saleem Butt	Pakistan Muslim League (N)	
PP-49	Ghazanfar Abbas Chheena	Pakistan Muslim League (N)	
PP-29	Ghulam Dastagir Lak	Pakistan Muslim League (N)	
PP-283	Ghulam Murtaza (politician)	Pakistan Muslim League (Z)	
PP-253	Ghulam Murtaza Raheem Khar	Pakistan Muslim League (N)	
PP-111	Haji Imran Zafar	Pakistan Muslim League (N)	
PP-65	Haji Muhammad Ilyas Ansari	Pakistan Muslim League (N)	
PP-254	Hammad Nawaz Khan	Pakistan Muslim League (N)	
PP-162	Hassaan Riaz	Pakistan Muslim League (N)	
PP-3	Iftikhar Ahmed (politician) (Warsi)	Pakistan Muslim League (N)	
PP-281	Ihsan ul Haq Bajwa	Pakistan Muslim League (N)	
PP-12	Ijaz Khan (politician)	Pakistan Tehreek-e-Insaf	
PP-91	Imran Khalid Butt	Pakistan Muslim League (N)	
PP-75	Imtiaz Ahmad Lali	Pakistan Muslim League (N)	
PP-57	Jafar Ali Hocha	Pakistan Muslim League (N)	
PP-174	Jamil Hassan Khan	Pakistan Muslim League (N)	
PP-186	Javaid Allouddin Sajid	Pakistan Muslim League (N)	
PP-195	Javed Akhtar (politician)	Pakistan Tehreek-e-Insaf	
PP-242	Javed Akhtar (Pakistani politician)	Pakistan Muslim League (N)	
PP-219	Karam Dad Wahla	Pakistan Muslim League (N)	
PP-40	Karam Elahi Bandial	Pakistan Muslim League (N)	
PP-80	Khalid Ghani Chaudhry	Pakistan Muslim League (N)	
PP-66	Khalid Saeed (politician)	Pakistan Muslim League (N)	
PP-137	Khawaja Imran Nazeer	Pakistan Muslim League (N)	
PP-241	Khawaja Muhammad Nizam-ul-Mehmood	Pakistan Peoples Party	
PP-135	Khawaja Muhammad Waseem	Pakistan Muslim League (N)	
PP-77	Khurram Abbas Sial	Pakistan Muslim League (N)	
PP-163	Khurram Ijaz Chattah	Pakistan Muslim League (N)	
PP-72	Khurram Shehzad (politician)	Pakistan Tehreek-e-Insaf	
PP-87	Lt Col (Retd) Sardar Muhammad Ayub Khan Ghadi	Pakistan Muslim League (N)	
PP-136	Lt Col (Retd) Shujait Ahmed Khan	Pakistan Muslim League (N)	
PP-265	Mahar Ijaz Ahmad Achlana	Pakistan Muslim League (N)	
PP-25	Mahar Muhammad Fayyaz	Pakistan Muslim League (N)	
PP-140	Majid Zahoor	Pakistan Muslim League (N)	
PP-109	Major (R) Moin Nawaz Warraich	Pakistan Muslim League (N)	
PP-292	Makhdoom Syed Ali Akbar Mehmood	Pakistan Peoples Party	
PP-267	Makhdoom Syed Iftikhar Hassan Gillani	Bahawalpur National Awami Party	
PP-285	Makhdoom Syed Muhammad Masood Alam	Pakistan Muslim League (N)	
PP-295	Makhdoom Syed Murtaza Mehmood	Pakistan Peoples Party	
PP-291	Makhdum Hashim Jawan Bakht	Pakistan Muslim League (N)	
PP-257	Malik Ahmad Karim Qaswar Langrial	Pakistan Muslim League (N)	
PP-178	Malik Ahmad Saeed Khan	Pakistan Muslim League (N)	
PP-251	Malik Ahmad Yar Hunjra	Pakistan Muslim League (N)	
PP-192	Malik Ali Abbas Khokhar	Pakistan Muslim League (N)	
PP-105	Malik Fiaz Ahmad Awan	Pakistan Muslim League (N)	
PP-158	Malik Ghulam Habib Awan	Pakistan Muslim League (N)	
PP-10	Malik Iftikhar Ahmed	Pakistan Muslim League (N)	
PP-201	Malik Mazhar Abbas Raan	Pakistan Muslim League (N)	
PP-179	Malik Muhammad Ahmad Khan	Pakistan Muslim League (N)	
PP-199	Malik Muhammad Ali Khokhar	Pakistan Muslim League (N)	
PP-272	Malik Muhammad Iqbal Channar	Pakistan Muslim League (N)	
PP-39	Malik Muhammad Javed Iqbal Awan	Pakistan Muslim League (N)	
PP-71	Malik Muhammad Nawaz	Pakistan Muslim League (N)	
PP-146	Malik Muhammad Waheed	Pakistan Muslim League (N)	
PP-42	Malik Muhammad Waris Kallu	Pakistan Muslim League (N)	
PP-28	Malik Mukhtar Ahmad Bherath	Pakistan Muslim League (N)	
PP-221	Malik Nadeem Kamran	Pakistan Muslim League (N)	
PP-160	Malik Saif ul Malook Khokhar	Pakistan Muslim League (N)	
PP-209	Malik Sajjad Hussain Joiya	Pakistan Muslim League (N)	
PP-8	Malik Taimoor Masood	Pakistan Tehreek-e-Insaf	
PP-7	Malik Umar Farooq	Pakistan Muslim League (N)	
PP-172	Malik Zulqarnain Dogar	Pakistan Muslim League (N)	
PP-189	Masood Shafqat	Pakistan Tehreek-e-Insaf	
PP-74	Maulana Muhammad Rehmat Ullah	Pakistan Muslim League (N)	
PP-205	Mehdi Abbas Khan	Pakistan Muslim League (N)	
PP-182	Mehmood Anwar	Pakistan Muslim League (N)	
PP-246	Mehmood Qadir Khan	Pakistan Muslim League (N)	
PP-79	Mehr Khalid Mahmood Sargana	Pakistan Muslim League (N)	
PP-255	Mian Alamdar Abbas Qureshi	Pakistan Muslim League (N)	
PP-227	Mian Atta Muhammad Manika	Pakistan Muslim League (N)	
PP-277	Mian Fida Hussain Wattoo	Pakistan Muslim League (N)	
PP-234	Mian Irfan Aqeel Daultana	Pakistan Muslim League (N)	
PP-193	Mian Khurram Jahangir Wattoo	Pakistan Peoples Party	
PP-31	Mian Manazir Hussain Ranjha	Pakistan Muslim League (N)	
PP-82	Mian Muhammad Azam	Pakistan Muslim League (N)	
PP-287	Mian Muhammad Islam Aslam	Pakistan Muslim League (N)	
PP-190	Mian Muhammad Munir	Pakistan Muslim League (N)	
PP-236	Mian Muhammad Saqib Khurshid	Pakistan Muslim League (N)	
PP-270	Mian Muhammad Shoaib Awaisi	Pakistan Muslim League (N)	
PP-141	Mian Mujtaba Shuja ur Rehman	Pakistan Muslim League (N)	
PP-280	Mian Mumtaz Ahmad	Pakistan Tehreek-e-Insaf	
PP-155	Mian Naseer Ahmad	Pakistan Muslim League (N)	
PP-228	Mian Naveed Ali	Pakistan Muslim League (N)	
PP-69	Mian Tahir Pervaz	Pakistan Muslim League (N)	
PP-113	Mian Tariq Mehmood (politician)	Pakistan Muslim League (N)	
PP-207	Muhammad Aamir Iqbal Shah	Pakistan Muslim League (N)	
PP-276	Muhammad Afzal (politician)	Pakistan Muslim League (Q)	
PP-274	Muhammad Afzal Gill	Pakistan Muslim League (N)	
PP-63	Muhammad Ajmal Asif	Pakistan Muslim League (N)	
PP-212	Muhammad Akbar Hayat Hiraj	Pakistan Muslim League (N)	
PP-176	Muhammad Anis Qureshi	Pakistan Muslim League (N)	
PP-13	Muhammad Arif Abbasi	Pakistan Tehreek-e-Insaf	
PP-167	Muhammad Arif Khan Sindhila	Pakistan Muslim League (N)	
PP-223	Muhammad Arshad Khan Lodhi	Pakistan Muslim League (N)	
PP-222	Muhammad Arshad Malik	Pakistan Muslim League (N)	
PP-130	Muhammad Asif Bajwa (politician) Advocate	Pakistan Muslim League (N)	
PP-41	Muhammad Asif Malik	Pakistan Muslim League (N)	
PP-83	Muhammad Aun Abbas Khan	Pakistan Muslim League (N)	
PP-290	Muhammad Ejaz Shafi	Pakistan Muslim League (N)	
PP-256	Muhammad Imran Qureshi	Pakistan Muslim League (N)	
PP-239	Muhammad Jahanzaib Khan Khichi	Pakistan Tehreek-e-Insaf	
PP-173	Muhammad Kashif (politician)	Pakistan Muslim League (N)	
PP-273	Muhammad Kazim Ali Pirzada	Pakistan Muslim League (N)	
PP-81	Muhammad Khan Baloch	Pakistan Muslim League (N)	
PP-123	Muhammad Mansha Ullah Butt	Pakistan Muslim League (N)	
PP-237	Muhammad Naeem Akhtar Khan Bhabha	Pakistan Muslim League (N)	
PP-284	Muhammad Naeem Anwar	Pakistan Muslim League (Z)	
PP-177	Muhammad Naeem Safdar Ansari	Pakistan Muslim League (N)	
PP-92	Muhammad Nawaz Chohan	Pakistan Muslim League (N)	
PP-90	Muhammad Rafique (politician)	Pakistan Muslim League (N)	
PP-17	Muhammad Shawez Khan	Pakistan Muslim League (N)	
PP-147	Muhammad Shoaib Siddiqui	Pakistan Tehreek-e-Insaf	
PP-46	Muhammad Sibtain Khan	Pakistan Tehreek-e-Insaf	
PP-157	Muhammad Tajammal Hussain	Pakistan Muslim League (N)	
PP-96	Muhammad Taufeeq Butt	Pakistan Muslim League (N)	
PP-145	Muhammad Waheed Gull	Pakistan Muslim League (N)	
PP-175	Muhammad Yaqoob Nadeem Sethi	Pakistan Muslim League (N)	
PP-194	Muhammad Zaheer ud Din Khan Alizai	Pakistan Tehreek-e-Insaf	
PP-252	Muhammad Zeeshan Gurmani	Pakistan Muslim League (N)	
PP-210	Muhammad Zubair Khan Baloch	Pakistan Muslim League (N)	
PP-240	Mumtaz Ahmad Qaisrani (Bhutto Khan)	Pakistan Muslim League (N)	
PP-127	Munawar Ahmed Gill	Pakistan Muslim League (N)	
PP-152	Murad Rass	Pakistan Tehreek-e-Insaf	
PP-61	Naeem Ullah Gill	Pakistan Muslim League (N)	
PP-108	Nawabzada Haider Mehdi	Pakistan Muslim League (N)	
PP-220	Peer Khizer Hayat Shah Khagga	Pakistan Muslim League (N)	
PP-198	Peerzada Mian Shahzad Maqbool Bhutta	Pakistan Muslim League (N)	
PP-95	Pir Ghulam Fareed	Pakistan Muslim League (N)	
PP-231	Pir Kashif Ali Chishty	Pakistan Muslim League (N)	
PP-164	Pir Muhammad Ashraf Rasool	Pakistan Muslim League (N)	
PP-208	Pirzada Muhammad Jahangir Sultan	Pakistan Muslim League (N)	
PP-99	Qaiser Iqbal Sindhu	Pakistan Muslim League (N)	
PP-268	Qazi Adnan Fareed	Pakistan Muslim League (N)	
PP-286	Qazi Ahmad Saeed	Pakistan Peoples Party	
PP-54	Rai Haider Ali Khan	Pakistan Muslim League (N)	
PP-202	Rai Mansab Ali Khan (politician)	Pakistan Muslim League (N)	
PP-56	Rai Muhamamd Usman Khan Kharal	Pakistan Muslim League (N)	
PP-297	Rais Ibrahim Khalil Ahmed	Pakistan Peoples Party	
PP-289	Rais Muhammad Mehboob Ahmed	Pakistan Muslim League (N)	
PP-14	Raja Abdul Hanif	Pakistan Muslim League (N)	
PP-2	Raja Muhammad Ali	Pakistan Muslim League (N)	
PP-24	Raja Muhammad Awais Khalid	Pakistan Muslim League (N)	
PP-11	Raja Rashid Hafeez	Pakistan Tehreek-e-Insaf	
PP-153	Ramzan Siddique Bhatti	Pakistan Muslim League (N)	
PP-217	Rana Babar Hussain	Pakistan Muslim League (N)	
PP-204	Rana Ijaz Ahmad Noon	Pakistan Muslim League (N)	
PP-126	Rana Liaqat Ali	Pakistan Muslim League (N)	
PP-134	Rana Mannan Khan	Pakistan Muslim League (N)	
PP-171	Rana Muhammad Arshad	Pakistan Muslim League (N)	
PP-121	Rana Muhammad Iqbal Harnah	Pakistan Muslim League (N)	
PP-36	Rana Munawar Hussain	Pakistan Muslim League (N)	
PP-55	Rana Shoaib Adrees Khan	Pakistan Muslim League (N)	
PP-203	Rana Tahir Shabbir	Pakistan Muslim League (N)	
PP-60	Rao Kashif Rahim Khan	Pakistan Muslim League (N)	
PP-37	Sahibzada Ghulam Nizam-ud-Din Sialvi	Pakistan Muslim League (N)	
PP-169	Sajjad Haider Gujjar	Pakistan Muslim League (N)	
PP-44	Salah ud Din Khan	Pakistan Tehreek-e-Insaf	
PP-261	Sardar Aamir Talal Khan Gopang	Pakistan Muslim League (N)	
PP-247	Sardar Ali Raza Khan Dreshak	Pakistan Tehreek-e-Insaf	
PP-250	Sardar Atif Hussain Khan Mazari	Pakistan Muslim League (N)	
PP-38	Sardar Bahadur Khan Maikan	Pakistan Muslim League (N)	
PP-269	Sardar Khalid Mahmood Waran	Pakistan Muslim League (N)	
PP-245	Sardar Muhammad Jamal Khan Laghari	Pakistan Muslim League (N)	
PP-288	Sardar Muhammad Nawaz Khan	Pakistan Muslim League (N)	
PP-249	Sardar Nasrullah Khan Dreshak	Independent	
PP-264	Sardar Qaisar Abbas Khan Magsi	Pakistan Muslim League (N)	
PP-263	Sardar Shahab-ud-Din Khan	Pakistan Peoples Party	
PP-248	Sardar Sher Ali Gorchani	Pakistan Muslim League (N)	
PP-180	Sardar Vickas Hassan Mokal	Pakistan Muslim League (Q)	
PP-119	Shafqat Mahmood (politician)	Pakistan Muslim League (N)	
PP-200	Shaukat Hayyat Khan Bosan	Pakistan Muslim League (N)	
PP-104	Shaukat Manzoor Cheema	Pakistan Muslim League (N)	
PP-23	Shehryar Malik	Pakistan Muslim League (N)	
PP-181	Sheikh Allauddin	Pakistan Muslim League (N)	
PP-68	Sheikh Ijaz Ahmad	Pakistan Muslim League (N)	
PP-18	Sher Ali Khan (politician)	Pakistan Muslim League (N)	
PP-278	Shoukat Ali Laleka	Pakistan Muslim League (N)	
PP-244	Syed Abdul Aleem	Pakistan Muslim League (N)	
PP-15	Syed Ejaz Hussain Bukhari	Pakistan Tehreek-e-Insaf	
PP-258	Syed Haroon Ahmed Sultan Bokhari	Pakistan Muslim League (N)	
PP-213	Syed Hussain Jahania Gardezi	Pakistan Muslim League (N)	
PP-120	Syed Muhammad Mahfooz Mashahdi	Pakistan Muslim League (N)	
PP-260	Syed Muhammad Sibtain Raza	Pakistan Muslim League (N)	
PP-89	Syed Qutab Ali Shah	Pakistan Muslim League (N)	
PP-117	Syed Tariq Yaqoob Rizvi	Pakistan Muslim League (N)	
PP-271	Syed Waseem Akhtar	Jamaat-e-Islami Pakistan	
PP-21	Tanveer Aslam Malik	Pakistan Muslim League (N)	
PP-125	Tariq Subhani	Pakistan Muslim League (N)	
PP-224	Waheed Asghar Dogar	Pakistan Tehreek-e-Insaf	
PP-19	Zafar Iqbal (politician)	Pakistan Muslim League (N)	
PP-22	Zulfiqar Ali Khan (politician)	Pakistan Muslim League (N)	
minority reserved seat	Kanji Ram	Pakistan Muslim League (N)	
minority reserved seat	Shahzad Munshi	Pakistan Muslim League (N)	
minority reserved seat	Shakeel Ivan	Pakistan Muslim League (N)	
minority reserved seat	Shunila Ruth	Pakistan Tehreek-e-Insaf	
minority reserved seat	Tariq Masih Gill	Pakistan Muslim League (N)	
minority reserved seat	Khalil Tahir Sandhu	Pakistan Muslim League (N)	
minority reserved seat	Ramesh Singh Arora	Pakistan Muslim League (N)	
minority reserved seat	Zulfiqar Ghouri	Pakistan Muslim League (N)	
women reserved seat	Naseem Lodhi	Pakistan Muslim League (N)	
women reserved seat	Najma Begum	Pakistan Muslim League (N)	
women reserved seat	Najma Afzal Khan	Pakistan Muslim League (N)	
women reserved seat	Naheed Naeem Rana	Pakistan Tehreek-e-Insaf	
women reserved seat	Nabira Indleeb	Pakistan Muslim League (N)	
women reserved seat	Nabila Hakim Ali Khan	Pakistan Tehreek-e-Insaf	
women reserved seat	Mehwish Sultana	Pakistan Muslim League (N)	
women reserved seat	Mary Gill	Pakistan Muslim League (N)	
women reserved seat	Lubna Rehan	Pakistan Muslim League (N)	
women reserved seat	Madiha Rana	Pakistan Muslim League (N)	
women reserved seat	Lubna Faisal	Pakistan Muslim League (N)	
women reserved seat	Khadija Umar	Pakistan Muslim League (Q)	
women reserved seat	Joyce Rofin Julius	Pakistan Muslim League (N)	
women reserved seat	Iram Hassan Bajwa	Pakistan Muslim League (N)	
women reserved seat	Hina Pervaiz Butt	Pakistan Muslim League (N)	
women reserved seat	Haseena Begum	Pakistan Muslim League (N)	
women reserved seat	Gulnaz Shahzadi	Pakistan Muslim League (N)	
women reserved seat	Ghazala Shaheen	Pakistan Muslim League (Z)	
women reserved seat	Fozia Ayub Qureshi	Pakistan Muslim League (N)	
women reserved seat	Farzana Nazir	Pakistan Muslim League (N)	
women reserved seat	Farzana Butt	Pakistan Muslim League (N)	
women reserved seat	Farhana Afzal	Pakistan Muslim League (N)	
women reserved seat	Farha Manzoor	Pakistan Muslim League (N)	
women reserved seat	Fareeha Fatima	Pakistan Muslim League (N)	
women reserved seat	Faiza Mushtaq	Pakistan Muslim League (N)	
women reserved seat	Faiza Ahmad Malik	Pakistan Peoples Party	
women reserved seat	Bushra Anjum Butt	Pakistan Muslim League (N)	
women reserved seat	Khola Amjad	Pakistan Muslim League (N)	
women reserved seat	Azra Sabir Khan	Pakistan Muslim League (N)	
women reserved seat	Azma Zahid Bukhari	Pakistan Muslim League (N)	
women reserved seat	Ayesha Javed	Pakistan Muslim League (N)	
women reserved seat	Alia Aftab	Pakistan Muslim League (N)	
women reserved seat	Zakia Shahnawaz Khan	Pakistan Muslim League (N)	
women reserved seat	Aisha Ghaus Pasha	Pakistan Muslim League (N)	
women reserved seat	Nausheen Hamid	Pakistan Tehreek-e-Insaf	
women reserved seat	Nighat Sheikh	Pakistan Muslim League (N)	
women reserved seat	Parveen Akhtar	Pakistan Muslim League (N)	
women reserved seat	Raheela Naeem	Pakistan Muslim League (N)	
women reserved seat	Raheela Anwar	Pakistan Tehreek-e-Insaf	
women reserved seat	Saira Iftikhar	Pakistan Muslim League (N)	
women reserved seat	Sadia Nadeem Malik	Pakistan Muslim League (N)	
women reserved seat	Raheela Yahya Munawar	Pakistan Muslim League (N)	
women reserved seat	Saba Sadiq	Pakistan Muslim League (N)	
women reserved seat	Saadia Sohail Rana	Pakistan Tehreek-e-Insaf	
women reserved seat	Rukhsana Kokab	Pakistan Muslim League (N)	
women reserved seat	Shameela Aslam	Pakistan Muslim League (N)	
women reserved seat	Sobia Anwar Satti	Pakistan Muslim League (N)	
women reserved seat	Shazia Tariq	Pakistan Muslim League (N)	
women reserved seat	Shazia Kamran	Pakistan Muslim League (N)	
women reserved seat	Shamim Akhtar	Pakistan Muslim League (N)	
women reserved seat	Shah Jahan	Pakistan Muslim League (N)	
women reserved seat	Shabeena Zikria Butt	Pakistan Muslim League (N)	
women reserved seat	Salma Shaheen Butt	Pakistan Muslim League (N)	
women reserved seat	Nasreen Jawaid	Pakistan Muslim League (N)	
women reserved seat	Sultana Shaheen	Pakistan Muslim League (N)	
women reserved seat	Sumaira Sami	Pakistan Muslim League (N)	
women reserved seat	Surriya Naseem	Pakistan Muslim League (N)	
women reserved seat	Tahia Noon	Pakistan Muslim League (N)	
women reserved seat	Tamkeen Akhtar Niazi	Pakistan Muslim League (N)	
women reserved seat	Tehseen Fawad	Pakistan Muslim League (N)	
women reserved seat	Zaib un Nisa Awan	Pakistan Muslim League (N)	
women reserved seat	Zill-e-Huma	Pakistan Muslim League (N)	
women reserved seat	Kanwal Nauman	Pakistan Muslim League (N)	
