= Najma =

Najma (Arabic: نجمة) or Al-Najma may refer to:

== Given name ==
- Najma (actress), Pakistani film actress
- Najma Akhtar (born 1953), Indian academic and academic administrator
- Najma Begum (born 1967), Pakistani politician member of the National Assembly of the Punjab
- Najma Chowdhury (1942–2021), Bangladesh academic
- Najma Hafeez, British politician
- Najma Hameed (1944–2022), Pakistani politician, member of Senate of Pakistan
- Najma Heptulla (born 1940), Indian politician, Governor if Manipur
- Najma Idrees (born 1952), Kuwaiti poet, writer and academic
- Najma Afzal Khan (born 1950), Pakistani politician, doctor, and philanthropist
- Najma Kousri (born 1991), Tunisian lawyer, journalist, feminist, LGBT activist
- Najma Mehboob (1949–1983), Pakistani actress
- Najma Parveen (born 1990), Pakistani sprinter
- Najma Sadeque (1943–2015), Pakistani journalist, author, and human rights activist
- Najma Shaheen (born 1962), Pakistani politician
- Najma Thabsheera (born 1995), Indian lawyer and politician
- Mehtab (actress) (1913–1997), born Najma, Indian actress

== Places ==
- Najma (Doha), a district in Qatar

== Arts and entertainment ==
- Najma (1943 film), an Indian film
- Najma (1983 film), a Bangladeshi film

== Sports ==
- Al-Nejmeh (disambiguation), number of sports clubs
  - Nejmeh SC, a Lebanese football club
  - Al-Najma SC (Bahrain), a Bahraini multi-sports club
  - Al-Najma SC (Saudi Arabia), a Saudi Arabian football club
  - Annajma SC, a Libyan football club

== See also ==
- Najm
- Najima (disambiguation)
