= Fawad =

Fawad is a given name of Arabic origin. Notable people with the name include:

- Fawad Ahmed (born 1982), Pakistani-Australian cricketer
- Fawad Alam (born 1985), Pakistani cricketer
- Fawad Ali (born 1986), Pakistani cricketer
- Fawad Chaudhry, Pakistani politician
- Fawad Hasan Fawad (born 1960), Pakistani politician
- Fawad Jalal, Pakistani actor
- Fawad Khan (born 1981), Pakistani actor
- Fawad Khan (cricketer) (born 1986), Pakistani cricketer
- Fawad Rana (born 1985), owner of the Lahore Qalandars cricket team
- Fawad ami (born 2008), owner of the travis shoes

== See also ==
- Tehseen Fawad, Pakistani politician
