= Arif (surname) =

== Aref ==
- Hassan Aref (1950–2011), Egyptian physicist
- Mohammad Reza Aref (born 1951), Iranian politician, former vice-president of Iran
- Yassin M. Aref (born 1970), American terror suspect

== Arif ==
- Mahmud Arif, (1909 – 2001) Saudi Arabian poet
- Abdul Salam Arif (1921–1966) and Abdul Rahman Arif (1916–2007), brothers presidents of Iraq
- Adil Arif (born 1994), Emirati cricketer
- Ahmed Arif (1927–1991), Turkish poet
- Celalettin Arif (1875–1928), Turkish politician
- Kader Arif (born 1953), French politician of Algiers origin
- Muhammad Arif (disambiguation), several people
- Naved Arif (born 1981), Professional cricketer
- Tevfik Arif (born 1953), real estate developer and financier for Donald Trump

== See also ==
- Arif (given name)
