= Muhammad Arif =

Muhammad Arif may refer to:

- Muhammad Arif Khan Rajbana Sial (1913–2010), Pakistani chieftain and politician
- Hajji Muhammad Arif Zarif (1943–2007), Afghan politician and businessman
- Muhammad Arif Shah Jahan (born 1954), Afghan politician and governor of Wardak province
- Muhammad Arif Khan Sindhila (born 1958), member of the Provincial Assembly of the Punjab
- Muhammad Arif Chaudhry (born 1959), former member of the National Assembly of Pakistan
- Muhammad Arif Sarwari (born 1961), Afghan politician and intelligence officer
- Muhammad Arif Abbasi (born 1965), former member of the Provincial Assembly of the Punjab
- Muhammad Arif (Pakistani politician), member of the Provincial Assembly of the Balochistan
- Mohammad Arif, Pakistani politician
- Muhammed Arif, Pakistani judge
- Mohamed Arif, Maldivian footballer
