= Irshad Ahmed =

Irshad Ahmad may refer to:

- Irshad Ahmed (politician), Scottish politician
- Irshad Ahmed Ansari, Indian carrom player
- Irshad Ahamad, Nepalese cricketer
- Chaudhry Irshad Ahmad Arain, Pakistani politician
