= Rana Muhammad Arif Iqbal Harnah =

Pakistani politician

Member of the Provincial Assembly of the Punjab
- Incumbent
- Assumed office 24 February 2024
- Constituency: PP-44 Sialkot-I
- In office 25 May 2018 – 20 January 2023

Personal details
- Party: PMLN (2018-present)
- Parent: Rana Muhammad Iqbal Harnah (father)
- Relatives: Rana Tariq Mehmood Harnah (brother)

Rana Muhammad Arif Iqbal Harnah is a Pakistani politician who had been a member of the Provincial Assembly of the Punjab from August 2018 till January 2023, He is now serving as the Member of the Provincial Assembly of the Punjab since 29 February 2024.

== Political career ==
He was elected to the Provincial Assembly of the Punjab as a candidate of the Pakistan Muslim League (N) from Constituency PP-35 (Sialkot-I) in the 2018 Pakistani general election.

He was re-elected to the Provincial Assembly of the Punjab as a candidate of Pakistan Muslim League (N) from constituency PP-44 Sialkot-I in the 2024 Pakistani general election.
