= Khawaja Muhammad Waseem =

Pakistani politician

Member of the Provincial Assembly of the Punjab
- In office 15 August 2018 – 14 January 2023
- Constituency: PP-50 Narowal-V
- In office 29 May 2013 – 31 May 2019
- Constituency: PP-135 (Narowal-IV)

Personal details
- Born: 17 April 1969 (age 57) Narowal, Punjab, Pakistan
- Party: PMLN (2013–present)

Khawaja Muhammad Waseem Butt (born 17 April 1969) is a Pakistani politician and businessman who served as a Member of the Provincial Assembly of the Punjab from 2013 to 2023. He was elected from Constituency PP-135 Narowal-IV in 2013 and from Constituency PP-50 Narowal-V in 2018 as a candidate of the PML-N.

== Early life and education ==
He was born on 17 April 1969 in Narowal to Khawaja Aman Ullah. He completed intermediate level education.

== Professional and political career ==
Waseem is a businessman by profession. He began his political career at the grassroots level and was elected as a Councillor of the Municipal Committee Narowal. He later served as the Chairman of the Municipal Committee Narowal and was elected as Tehsil Nazim of Narowal for two consecutive terms.

In the 2013 Pakistani general election, he was elected to the Provincial Assembly of the Punjab from Constituency PP-135 (Narowal-IV) as a candidate of the PML-N.

He was re-elected to the Provincial Assembly from PP-50 (Narowal-V) in the 2018 Pakistani general election.

He served as Parliamentary Secretary for Cooperatives starting from 17 February 2017. He has represented Pakistan on official and personal visits to countries including Saudi Arabia, Germany, Hong Kong, and Dubai.

== Personal life ==
His wife, Samina Waseem, served as a Member of the Provincial Assembly of the Punjab from 2008 to 2013, and chaired the Standing Committee on Special Education.

== See also ==
- List of members of the 16th Provincial Assembly of the Punjab
- List of members of the 17th Provincial Assembly of the Punjab
