= Chaudhry Nazar Hussain =

Pakistani politician

Member of the Provincial Assembly of the Punjab
- In office 29 May 2013 – 31 May 2018
- Constituency: PP-27 (Jhelum-IV)

Personal details
- Born: 1 January 1953 (age 73) Jhelum
- Party: Pakistan Muslim League (N)

Chaudhry Nazar Hussain is a Pakistani politician who was a Member of the Provincial Assembly of the Punjab, from 2002 to 2007 and again from May 2013 to May 2018.

== Early life and education ==
He was born on 1 January 1953 in Jhelum.

He has a degree of Bachelor of Arts and a degree of Bachelor of Law which he obtained in 1976 from University of the Punjab.

== Political career ==
He was elected to the Provincial Assembly of the Punjab as a candidate of Pakistan Muslim League (Q) (PML-Q) from Constituency PP-27 (Jhelum-IV) in the 2002 Pakistani general election. He received 33,433 votes and defeated Chaudhry Muhammad Abid, a candidate of Pakistan Muslim League (N) (PML-N).

He ran for the seat of the Provincial Assembly of the Punjab as a candidate of PML-Q from Constituency PP-27 (Jhelum-IV) in the 2008 Pakistani general election. He received 32,911 votes and lost the seat to Nawabzada Syed Shams Haider.

He was re-elected to the Provincial Assembly of the Punjab as a candidate of PML-N from Constituency PP-27 (Jhelum-IV) in the 2013 Pakistani general election. He received 49,069 votes and defeated Chaudhary Muhammad Abid, a candidate of PML-Q.
