= Shabeena Zikria Butt =

Pakistani politician

Member of the Provincial Assembly of the Punjab
- In office 29 May 2013 – 31 May 2018
- Constituency: Reserved seat for women

Personal details
- Born: 14 April 1972 (age 54) Daska
- Party: Pakistan Muslim League (N)

Shabeena Zikria Butt (Urdu: شبینہ زکریا بٹ; born 14 April 1972) is a Pakistani politician who was a Member of the Provincial Assembly of the Punjab, from May 2013 to May 2018.

== Early life and education ==
She was born on 14 April 1972 in Daska.

She earned the degree of Master of Arts in Urdu from Murray College in 1999.

== Political career ==
She was elected to the Provincial Assembly of the Punjab as a candidate of Pakistan Muslim League (N) on a reserved seat for women in the 2013 Pakistani general election.
