= Ramzan Siddique Bhatti =

Pakistani politician

Member of the Provincial Assembly of the Punjab
- In office 15 August 2018 – 14 January 2023
- Constituency: PP-166 Lahore-XXIII
- In office 2008 – 31 May 2018

Personal details
- Born: 2 June 1976 (age 50) Lahore, Punjab, Pakistan
- Party: PMLN

Ramzan Siddique Bhatti is a Pakistani politician who was a Member of the Provincial Assembly of the Punjab, from 2008 to May 2018 and from August 2018 to January 2023.

== Early life and education ==
He was born on 2 June 1976 in Lahore.

He has a Bachelor of Arts degree which he obtained in 1995 from Forman Christian College.

== Political career ==
He was elected to the Provincial Assembly of the Punjab as a candidate of Pakistan Muslim League (N) (PML-N) from Constituency PP-153 (Lahore-XVII) in the 2008 Pakistani general election. He received 24,391 votes and defeated Zulfiqar Ali Badar, a candidate of Pakistan Peoples Party (PPP).

He was re-elected to the Provincial Assembly of the Punjab as a candidate of PML-N from Constituency PP-153 (Lahore-XVII) in the 2013 Pakistani general election.

In December 2013, he was appointed Parliamentary Secretary for local government.

He was re-elected to Provincial Assembly of the Punjab as a candidate of PML-N from Constituency PP-166 (Lahore-XXIII) in the 2018 Pakistani general election.
