= Chaudhry Fazal ur Rehman =

Pakistani politician

Member of the Provincial Assembly of the Punjab
- In office 29 May 2013 – 31 May 2018
- Constituency: PP-215 (Khanewal-IV)

Personal details
- Born: 15 June 1961 (age 65) Multan
- Party: Pakistan Muslim League (Nawaz)

Punjab Assembly Lahore

Chaudhry Fazal ur Rehman is a Pakistani politician who was a Member of the Provincial Assembly of the Punjab, from 1997 to 1999 and again from May 2013 to May 2018.

== Early life and education ==
He was born on 15 June 1961 in Multan.

He has received Intermediate education.

== Political career ==
He ran for the seat of the Provincial Assembly of the Punjab as a candidate of Pakistan Muslim League (N) (PML-N) from Constituency PP-176 (Khanewal-III) in the 1993 Pakistani general election but was unsuccessful. He received 26,885 votes and lost the seat to Sardar Allah Yar Hiraj, a candidate of Pakistan Peoples Party (PPP).

He was elected to the Provincial Assembly of the Punjab as a candidate of PML-N from Constituency PP-176 (Khanewal-III) in the 1997 Pakistani general election. He secured 27,064 votes and defeated Sardar Allah Yar Hiraj, a candidate of PPP.

He was re-elected to the Provincial Assembly of the Punjab as a candidate of PML-N from Constituency PP-215 (Khanewal-IV) in the 2013 Pakistani general election. He received 45,039 votes and defeated Ahmad Yar Hiraj, a candidate of Pakistan Muslim League (Q) (PML-Q).
