= Mary James Gill =

Pakistani politician (born 1985)

Member of the Provincial Assembly of the Punjab
- In office 29 May 2013 – 31 May 2018
- Constituency: Reserved seat for women

Personal details
- Born: 28 August 1985 (age 41)
- Party: Pakistan Muslim League (N)

Mary James Gill (Urdu: میری گل; born 28 August 1985) is a Pakistani politician who was a Member of the Provincial Assembly of the Punjab, from May 2013 to May 2018.

== Early life and education ==
She was born on 28 August 1985.

She earned the degrees of Bachelor of Arts (Hons) with Roll of Honour in 2004 from Lahore College for Women University. In 2007, she received a degree of Bachelor of Laws.

== Political career ==
She was elected to the Provincial Assembly of the Punjab as a candidate of Pakistan Muslim League (N) on a reserved seat for women in the 2013 Pakistani general election.
