= Lubna Faisal =

Pakistani politician

Member of the Provincial Assembly of the Punjab
- In office 29 May 2013 – 31 May 2018
- Constituency: Reserved seat for women

Personal details
- Born: 1 March 1958 (age 68) Lahore
- Party: Pakistan Muslim League (N)

Lubna Faisal (Urdu: لبنی فیصل; born 1 March 1958) is a Pakistani politician who was a Member of the Provincial Assembly of the Punjab, from May 2013 to May 2018.

== Early life and education ==
She was born on 1 March 1958 in Lahore.

She is a graduate and has received Certificate in Professional Studies in Education from Bradford College in 1999.

== Political career ==
She was elected to the Provincial Assembly of the Punjab as a candidate of Pakistan Muslim League (N) on a reserved seat for women in the 2013 Pakistani general election.

During her tenure, she advocated for women's empowerment, social protection for home-based workers, dengue surveillance, and children's rights.

She also participated in the "Parliamentarians Without Borders for Children's Rights" in Nepal in March 2015 as one of the fifteen parliamentarians from nine countries who discussed a range of issues concerning the elimination of child labour, child slavery and trafficking; the need for equitable, inclusive and quality education for every child and the promotion of laws that protect children from “all forms of violence”.
