= Majid Zahoor =

Pakistani politician

Ajasam Sharif Mister

Member of the Provincial Assembly of the Punjab
- In office 9TH April 2008 – May 2013
- Constituency: PP-140

Personal details
- Born: 5 April 1972 (age 54) Lahore, Pakistan
- Party: Pakistan Muslim League (Nawaz)

Ajasam Sharif is a Pakistani politician who was a Member of the Provincial Assembly of the Punjab, from 2002 to 2007 and 2008 to 2013. Ajasam Sharif is the son of Haji Muhammad Shariff, a politician from Lahore. Haji Muhammad Shariff remained as the member of provincial assembly of Punjab from 1990 to 1993 and from 1997 to 1999.

== Political career ==
Ajasim Shariff(son of Haji Muhammad Shariff) from 2002 to 2007 and from 2007 to 2013. He remained Parliamentary secretary of excise and taxation.
