= Shahzad Munshi =

Pakistani politician

Member of the Provincial Assembly of the Punjab
- In office 29 May 2013 – 31 May 2018
- Constituency: Reserved seat for minorities

Personal details
- Born: 27 November 1969 (age 56) Lahore
- Party: Pakistan Muslim League (N)

Shahzad Munshi is a Pakistani politician who was a Member of the Provincial Assembly of the Punjab, from May 2013 to May 2018.

== Early life and education ==
He was born on 27 November 1969 in Lahore.

He graduated from Government Dayal Singh College, Lahore in 1989 from where received the degree of the Bachelor of Science.

== Political career ==
He was elected to the Provincial Assembly of the Punjab as a candidate of Pakistan Muslim League (N) on reserved seat for minorities in the 2013 Pakistani general election.
