= Pir Ghulam Fareed =

Pakistani politician

Member of the Provincial Assembly of the Punjab
- In office 29 May 2013 – 31 May 2018

Personal details
- Born: 26 December 1942 (age 83) Gujranwala
- Party: Pakistan Muslim League (N)

Pir Ghulam Fareed is a Pakistani politician who was a Member of the Provincial Assembly of the Punjab, from 1985 to 1988 and again from May 2013 to May 2018.

== Early life ==
He was born on 26 December 1942 in Gujranwala.

== Political career ==
He was elected to the Provincial Assembly of the Punjab from Constituency PP-139 (Gujranwala) in the 1985 Pakistani general election.

He ran for the seat of the Provincial Assembly of the Punjab as a candidate of Islami Jamhoori Ittehad (IJI) from Constituency PP-87 (Gujranwala-XI) in the 1988 Pakistani general election but was unsuccessful. He received 9,279 votes and lost the seat to a candidate of Pakistan Peoples Party (PPP).

He ran for the seat of the Provincial Assembly of the Punjab as an independent candidate from Constituency PP-87 (Gujranwala-XI) in the 1997 Pakistani general election but was unsuccessful. He received 1,805 votes and lost the seat to a candidate of Pakistan Muslim League (N) (PML-N.

He was re-elected to the Provincial Assembly of the Punjab as a candidate of PML-N from Constituency PP-95 (Gujranwala-V) in the 2013 Pakistani general election.
