= Chaudhry Muhammad Akram =

Pakistani politician

Member of the Provincial Assembly of the Punjab
- In office December 2012 – 31 May 2018
- Constituency: PP-122 (Sialkot-II)

Personal details
- Born: 1 April 1950 (age 76) Sialkot, Punjab, Pakistan
- Other political affiliations: Pakistan Muslim League (N)
- Children: Chaudhary Faisal Akram

Chaudhry Muhammad Akram is a Pakistani politician who was a Member of the Provincial Assembly of the Punjab, from December 2012 to May 2018.

== Early life and education ==
He was born on 1 April 1950 in Sialkot.

He has received Matriculation education.

== Political career ==
He is PMLN Sialkot City President for more than 10 years and still holds the position.

He was elected to the Provincial Assembly of the Punjab as a candidate of Pakistan Muslim League (Nawaz) (PML-N) from Constituency PP-122 (Sialkot-II) in by-polls held in December 2012. He received 27,291 votes and defeated a candidate of Pakistan Peoples Party.

He was re-elected to the Provincial Assembly of the Punjab as a candidate of PML-N from Constituency PP-122 (Sialkot-II) in the 2013 Pakistani general election. He received 43,167 votes and defeated Mir Umer Farooq Meyer, a candidate of Pakistan Tehreek-e-Insaf (PTI).
