= Abu Hafs Muhammad Ghiyas-ud-Din =

Pakistani politician

Member of the Provincial Assembly of the Punjab
- In office 15 August 2018 – 14 January 2023
- Constituency: PP-47 Narowal-II
- In office 29 May 2013 – 31 May 2018
- Constituency: PP-133 (Narowal-II)
- In office 20 February 1997 – 12 October 1999
- Constituency: PP-114 (Narowal-III)
- In office March 1985 – 29 May 1988
- Constituency: PP-155 (Sialkot)

Personal details
- Born: 1 January 1948 (age 78) Narowal, Punjab, Pakistan
- Other political affiliations: PMLN (1997-2025)
- Children: 8

Punjab Assembly Lahore

Abu Hafs Muhammad Ghiyas-ud-Din is a Pakistani religious scholar and politician who had been a Member of the Provincial Assembly of the Punjab from August 2018 till January 2023. Previously, he was a member of the Punjab Assembly between 1985 and May 2018.

== Early life and education ==
He was born on 1 January 1948 in Narowal, Punjab.

In 1987, he has received Shahadatul Almia which is equivalent to Master of Arts in Islamic Studies from Tanzeem-ul-Madaris Ahl-e-Sunnat, Lahore.

He graduated from University of the Punjab in 2006 and obtained a Bachelor of Arts.

== Political career ==
He was elected to the Provincial Assembly of the Punjab from Constituency PP-155 (Sialkot) in the 1985 Pakistani general election.

He ran for the seat of the National Assembly of Pakistan as a candidate of Pakistan Awami Tehrik (PAT) from Constituency NA-91 (Sialkot-VII) in the 1988 Pakistani general election but was unsuccessful. He received 21,497 votes and defeated Anwar Aziz Chaudhry, a candidate of Islami Jamhoori Ittehad (IJI).

He ran for the seat of the Provincial Assembly of the Punjab as a candidate of the Pakistan Democratic Alliance (PDA) from Constituency PP-114 (Sialkot-XIII) in the 1990 Pakistani general election, but was unsuccessful. He received 3,752 votes and lost the seat to Atiq-ur-Rehman, a candidate of IJI.

He ran for the seat of the Provincial Assembly of the Punjab as an independent candidate from Constituency PP-114 (Narowal-III) in the 1993 Pakistani general election, but was unsuccessful. He received 9,437 votes and lost the seat to Muhammad Tariq Anees, a candidate of Pakistan Muslim League (N) (PML-N).

He was re-elected to the Provincial Assembly of the Punjab as an independent candidate from Constituency PP-114 (Narowal-III) in the 1997 Pakistani general election. He received 14,609 votes and defeated Asghar Ali Chaudhry, a candidate of PML-N.

He ran for the seat of the Provincial Assembly of the Punjab as an independent candidate from Constituency PP-33 (Narowal-II) in the 2002 Pakistani general election, but was unsuccessful. He received 13,227 votes and lost the seat to Tahir Ali Javed, a candidate of Pakistan Muslim League (Q) (PML-Q).

He ran for the seat of the Provincial Assembly of the Punjab as a candidate of Pakistan Peoples Party (PPP) from Constituency PP-33 (Narowal-II) in the 2008 Pakistani general election, but was unsuccessful. He received 16,279 votes and lost the seat to Tahir Ali Javed, a candidate of PML-Q.

He was re-elected to the Provincial Assembly of the Punjab as a candidate of PML-N from Constituency PP-133 (Narowal-II) in the 2013 Pakistani general election. He received 45,473 votes and defeated an independent candidate, Naimat Ali Javed.

He was re-elected to Provincial Assembly of the Punjab as a candidate of PML-N from Constituency PP-47 (Narowal-II) in the 2018 Pakistani general election.

He was expelled from the PML-N in 2020 with other MPAs for having violated the party's rules as he met Punjab's Chief Minister Usman Buzdar without the approval of the leadership.
