= Pir Kashif Ali Chishty =

Pakistani politician

Member of the Provincial Assembly of the Punjab
- In office 15 August 2018 – 14 January 2023
- Constituency: PP-195 Pakpattan-V
- In office 2002 – 31 May 2018

Personal details
- Born: 7 December 1972 (age 53) Lahore, Punjab, Pakistan
- Party: PMLN

Pir Kashif Ali Chishty is a Pakistani politician who was a Member of the Provincial Assembly of the Punjab, from 2002 to May 2018 and from August 2018 to January 2023.

== Early life and education ==
He was born on 7 December 1972 in Lahore.

He received his early education from Aitchison College. He graduated in Accounting, Finance and Economics from University of Essex in 1995. He has the degree of Master of Business Administration in 1997 from Manchester Business School.

== Political career ==
He was elected to the Provincial Assembly of the Punjab as a candidate of Pakistan Muslim League (Q) (PML-Q) from Constituency PP-231 (Pakpattan-V) in the 2002 Pakistani general election. He received 36,927 votes and defeated a candidate of Pakistan Muslim League (N) (PML-N).

He was re-elected to the Provincial Assembly of the Punjab as a candidate of PML-Q from Constituency PP-231 (Pakpattan-V) in the 2008 Pakistani general election. He received 26,790 votes and defeated Khan Amir Hamza Rath, an independent candidate.

He was re-elected to the Provincial Assembly of the Punjab as a candidate of PML-N from Constituency PP-231 (Pakpattan-V) in the 2013 Pakistani general election.

He was re-elected to Provincial Assembly of the Punjab as a candidate of PML-N from Constituency PP-195 (Pakpattan-V) in the 2018 Pakistani general election.
