= Salma Shaheen Butt =

Pakistani politician

Member of the Provincial Assembly of the Punjab
- In office 29 May 2013 – 31 May 2018
- Constituency: Reserved seat for women

Personal details
- Born: 1 January 1949 (age 77) Gujranwala, Punjab, Pakistan
- Party: PMLN (2013-present)

Salma Shaheen Butt (Urdu: سلمہ شاہین بٹ; born 1 January 1949) is a Pakistani politician who was a Member of the Provincial Assembly of the Punjab, from May 2013 to May 2018.

== Early life ==
She was born on 1 January 1949 in Gujranwala.

== Political career ==
She was elected to the Provincial Assembly of the Punjab as a candidate of Pakistan Muslim League (N) on a reserved seat for women in the 2013 Pakistani general election.
