= Shah Jahan (politician) =

Pakistani politician

Member of the Provincial Assembly of the Punjab
- In office 29 May 2013 – 31 May 2018
- Constituency: Reserved seat for women

Personal details
- Born: 6 June 1952 (age 74)
- Party: Pakistan Muslim League (N)

Shah Jahan (Urdu: شاہ جہان; born 6 June 1952) is a Pakistani politician who was a Member of the Provincial Assembly of the Punjab, from May 2013 to May 2018.

== Early life ==
She was born on 6 June 1952 in Lahore.

== Political career ==
She was elected to the Provincial Assembly of the Punjab as a candidate of Pakistan Muslim League (N) on a reserved seat for women in the 2013 Pakistani general election.
