= Muhammad Aun Abbas Khan =

Pakistani politician (1982–2021)

Member of the Provincial Assembly of the Punjab
- In office 29 May 2013 – 31 May 2018

Personal details
- Born: 16 June 1982 Lahore
- Died: 31 October 2021 (aged 39)
- Party: Pakistan Muslim League (Nawaz)

Muhammad Aun Abbas Khan Sial (Urdu: محمد عون عباس خان سیال) (16 June 1982 – 31 October 2021) was a Pakistani politician who was a Member of the Provincial Assembly of the Punjab, from May 2013 to May 2018.

== Early life and education ==
He was born on 16 June 1982 in Lahore. He received his early education from Aitchison College and did ICS from American National School, Lahore. He died on 31 October 2021 due to cardiac arrest.

== Political career ==
He was elected to the Provincial Assembly of the Punjab as an independent candidate from Constituency PP-83 (Jhang-XI) in the 2013 Pakistani general election. He joined Pakistan Muslim League (N) in May 2013.
