= Zaib un Nisa Awan =

Politician in Pakistan

Member of the Provincial Assembly of the Punjab
- In office 29 May 2013 – 31 May 2018
- Constituency: Reserved seat for women

Personal details
- Born: 3 September 1963 (age 63) Talagang, Punjab, Pakistan
- Party: PMLN (2013-present)

Zaib un Nisa Awan (Urdu: زیب النساء اعوان) is a Pakistani politician who was a Member of the Provincial Assembly of the Punjab, from May 2013 to May 2018.

== Early life and education ==
She was born on 3 September 1963 in Talagang.

She received middle-level education.

== Political career ==
She was elected to the Provincial Assembly of the Punjab as a candidate of Pakistan Muslim League (N) (PML-N) on a reserved seat for women in the 2013 Pakistani general election.

She was re-elected to the Provincial Assembly of the Punjab as a candidate of PML-N on a reserved seat for women in the 2018 Pakistani general election.
