= Naeem Ullah Gill =

Pakistani politician

Member of the Provincial Assembly of the Punjab
- In office 29 May 2013 – 31 May 2018

Personal details
- Born: 1 January 1985 (age 41) Faisalabad
- Party: Pakistan Muslim League (Nawaz)

Naeem Ullah Gill is a Pakistani politician who was a Member of the Provincial Assembly of the Punjab, from May 2013 to May 2018.

== Early life and education ==
He was born on 1 January 1985 in Faisalabad.

He completed ICS in 2002 from Punjab College in Faisalabad. He has the degree of Bachelor of Science (Hons) in Hotel Management which he received in 2005 from Intercollege Larnaca, Cyprus.

== Political career ==
He was elected to the Provincial Assembly of the Punjab as an independent candidate from Constituency PP-61 (Faisalabad-XI) in the 2013 Pakistani general election. He joined Pakistan Muslim League (N) in May 2013.
