= Nighat Sheikh =

Pakistani politician

Member of the Provincial Assembly of the Punjab
- In office 2008 – 31 May 2018
- Constituency: Reserved seat for women

Personal details
- Born: 28 April 1970 (age 56) Lahore
- Party: Pakistan Muslim League (N)

Nighat Sheikh (Urdu: نگہت شیخ; born 28 April 1970) is a Pakistani politician who was a Member of the Provincial Assembly of the Punjab, from 2008 to May 2018.

== Early life and education ==
She was born on 28 April 1970 in Lahore.

She graduated from the University of the Punjab in 1992 and earned the degree of Bachelor of Education from Government College of Education for Women, Lahore in 1999. She also has a Bachelor of Arts degree.

== Political career ==
She was elected to the Provincial Assembly of the Punjab as a candidate for Pakistan Muslim League (N) (PML-N) on a reserved seat for women in the 2008 Pakistani general election.

She was re-elected to the Provincial Assembly of the Punjab as a candidate for PML-N on a reserved seat for women in the 2013 Pakistani general election.
