= Naheed Naeem Rana =

Pakistani politician

Member of the Provincial Assembly of the Punjab
- In office 29 May 2013 – 31 May 2018
- Constituency: Reserved seat for women

Personal details
- Born: 13 October 1972 (age 53) Gujranwala Punjab, Pakistan
- Party: PTI (2013-present)

Naheed Naeem Rana (Urdu: ناہید نعیم; born 13 October 1972) is a Pakistani politician who was a Member of the Provincial Assembly of the Punjab, from May 2013 to May 2018.

== Early life ==
She was born on 13 October 1972 in Gujranwala.

== Political career ==
She was elected to the Provincial Assembly of the Punjab as a candidate of Pakistan Tehreek-e-Insaf on a reserved seat for women in the 2013 Pakistani general election.
