= Farzana Butt =

Pakistani politician

Member of the Provincial Assembly of the Punjab
- In office 29 May 2013 – 31 May 2018
- Constituency: Reserved seat for women

Personal details
- Born: 27 May 1960 (age 66)
- Party: Pakistan Muslim League (N)

Farzana Butt (Urdu: فرزانہ بٹ; born 27 May 1960) is a Pakistani politician who was a Member of the Provincial Assembly of the Punjab, from May 2013 to May 2018.

== Early life and education ==
She was born on 27 May 1960.

She has completed Intermediate level education.

== Political career ==
She was elected to the Provincial Assembly of the Punjab as a candidate of Pakistan Muslim League (N) on a reserved seat for women in the 2013 Pakistani general election.
