= Mian Atta Muhammad Manika =

Pakistani politician

Member of the Provincial Assembly of the Punjab
- In office 2002 – 31 May 2018

Personal details
- Born: 10 October 1945 (age 81) Punjab, British India
- Other political affiliations: Pakistan Muslim League (Nawaz)
- Spouse: Parveen Akhtar

Punjab Assembly Lahore

Mian Atta Muhammad Manika (Punjabi: میاں عطاء محمد مانیکا) is a Pakistani Punjabi politician who was a Member of the Provincial Assembly of the Punjab, from 2002 to May 2018. He is the husband of Parveen Akhtar.

== Early life and education ==
He was born on 10 October 1945.

He has the degree of Master of Arts which he received from Government College University, Lahore in 1966.

== Political career ==
He was elected to the Provincial Assembly of the Punjab as a candidate of Pakistan Muslim League (J) from Constituency PP-159 Okara in the 1993 Pakistani general election.

Manika was elected to the National Assembly of Pakistan from Constituency NA-113 Okara-IV in 1989 where he remained until 1990.

He was re-elected to the Provincial Assembly of the Punjab as a candidate of Pakistan Muslim League (Q) (PML-Q) from Constituency PP-227 (Pakpattan-I) in the 2002 Pakistani general election.

He was re-elected to the Provincial Assembly of the Punjab as a candidate of PML-Q from Constituency PP-227 (Pakpattan-I) in the 2008 Pakistani general election.

He was re-elected to the Provincial Assembly of the Punjab as a candidate of Pakistan Muslim League (N) from Constituency PP-227 (Pakpattan-I) in the 2013 Pakistani general election. In June 2013, he was inducted into the provincial cabinet of Chief Minister Shahbaz Sharif and was made Provincial Minister of Punjab for Social Welfare and Baitul Maal, where he served until November 2013. In November 2013, he was made Provincial Minister of Punjab for Auqaf and Religious Affairs where he served until November 2016. In a cabinet reshuffle in November 2016, he was made Provincial Minister of Punjab for Revenue.
