= Malik Muhammad Javed Iqbal Awan =

Pakistani politician (born 1951)

Member of the Provincial Assembly of the Punjab
- In office 2002 – 31 May 2018

Personal details
- Born: 7 November 1951 (age 75) Sargodha
- Party: Pakistan Muslim League (N)

Punjab Assembly Lahore

Malik Muhammad Javed Iqbal Awan is a Pakistani politician who was a Member of the Provincial Assembly of the Punjab, from 2002 to May 2018.

== Early life and education ==
He was born on 7 November 1951 in Sargodha.

He has the degree of Bachelor of Arts and the degree of Bachelor of Laws where he received in 1976 from Punjab University Law College.

== Political career ==
He was elected to the Provincial Assembly of the Punjab as a candidate of Pakistan Muslim League (Q) from Constituency PP-39 (Khushab-I) in the 2002 Pakistani general election. He received 38,367 votes and defeated Malik Mukhtar Ahmed Awan, a candidate of National Alliance.

He was re-elected to the Provincial Assembly of the Punjab as an independent candidate from Constituency PP-39 (Khushab-I) in the 2008 Pakistani general election. He received 24,235 votes and defeated Faisal Aziz, a candidate of PML-Q.

He was re-elected to the Provincial Assembly of the Punjab as a candidate of Pakistan Muslim League (N) (PML-N) from Constituency PP-39 (Khushab-I) in the 2013 Pakistani general election. He received 42,635 votes and defeated Malik Ameer Mukhtar Sangha Awan, a candidate of Pakistan Tehreek-e-Insaf (PTI).
