= Tamkeen Akhtar Niazi =

Pakistani politician

Member of the Provincial Assembly of the Punjab
- In office 29 May 2013 – 31 May 2018
- Constituency: Reserved seat for women

Personal details
- Born: Abbottabad
- Party: Pakistan Muslim League (N)

Tamkeen Akhtar Niazi (Urdu: تمکین اختر نیازی) is a Pakistani politician who was a Member of the Provincial Assembly of the Punjab, from May 2013 to May 2018.

== Early life and education ==
She was born in September in Abbottabad.

She has earned the degree of Bachelor of Arts in psychology from Kinnaird College for Women University. She received a Diploma in Apparel Management from Southern Polytechnic State University.

== Political career ==
She was elected to the Provincial Assembly of the Punjab as a candidate of Pakistan Muslim League (N) on a reserved seat for women in the 2013 Pakistani general election.

On 13 May 2024, the Election Commission of Pakistan (ECP) suspended her membership as a member of the National Assembly. This action followed a Supreme Court of Pakistan decision to suspend the verdict of the Peshawar High Court, which had denied the allocation of a reserved seat to the PTI-Sunni Ittehad Council bloc.
