= Rais Ibrahim Khalil Ahmed =

Pakistani politician

Member of the Provincial Assembly of the Punjab
- In office 2008 – 31 May 2018

Personal details
- Born: 22 June 1963 (age 62) Karachi
- Party: Pakistan Peoples Party

Rais Ibrahim Khalil Ahmed is a Pakistani politician who was a Member of the Provincial Assembly of the Punjab, from 2008 to May 2018.

== Early life and education ==
He was born on 22 June 1963 in Karachi, Sindh.

He has a degree of Bachelor of Commerce and a degree of Bachelor of Laws which he received in 1987 from Sindh Muslim Law College.

== Political career ==
He was elected to the Provincial Assembly of the Punjab as a candidate of Pakistan Peoples Party (PPP) from Constituency PP-297 (Rahimyar Khan-XIII) in the 2008 Pakistani general election. He received 34,846 votes and defeated a candidate of Pakistan Muslim League (Q).

He was re-elected to the Provincial Assembly of the Punjab as a candidate of PPP from Constituency PP-297 (Rahimyar Khan-XIII) in the 2013 Pakistani general election.
