= Javaid Alla-ud-Din Sajid =

Pakistani politician

Member of the Provincial Assembly of the Punjab
- In office 15 August 2018 – 14 January 2023
- Constituency: PP-183 Okara-I
- In office 2002 – 31 May 2018
- Constituency: PP-186 Okara-II

Personal details
- Born: 27 March 1965 (age 61) Okara District, Punjab, Pakistan
- Party: PMLN (2002-present)

Punjab Assembly Lahore

Javaid Allouddin Sajid is a Pakistani politician who was a Member of the Provincial Assembly of the Punjab, from 2002 to May 2018 and from August 2018 to January 2023.

== Early life and education ==
He was born on 27 March 1965 in Okara District.

He graduated from University of the Punjab in 1990 and has a degree of Bachelor of Arts.

== Political career ==
He was elected to the Provincial Assembly of the Punjab as a candidate of Pakistan Muslim League (Q) (PML-Q) from Constituency PP-186 (Okara-II) in the 2002 Pakistani general election. He received 26,720 votes and defeated Sardar Moin Aslam Moakkal, an independent candidate.

He was re-elected to the Provincial Assembly of the Punjab as a candidate of Pakistan Peoples Party (PPP) from Constituency PP-186 (Okara-II) in the 2008 Pakistani general election. He received 38,918 votes and defeated Azhar Mahmood Chaudhary, a candidate of PML-Q.

He was re-elected to the Provincial Assembly of the Punjab as a candidate of Pakistan Muslim League (N) (PML-N) from Constituency PP-186 (Okara-II) in the 2013 Pakistani general election. He received 38,178 votes and defeated Rao Muhammad Qaisar Khan, a candidate of PPP.

He was re-elected to Provincial Assembly of the Punjab as a candidate of PML-N from Constituency PP-183 (Okara-I) in the 2018 Pakistani general election.

In the 2024 General Elections, he was re-elected member of Punjab Assembly as a candidate of PML-N from PP-185 Okara-I. He defeated Mehar Muhammad Javed, an independent candidate supported by PTI.
