= Malik Sajjad Hussain Joiya =

Pakistani politician (born 1959)

Member of the Provincial Assembly of the Punjab
- In office 29 May 2013 – 31 May 2018

Personal details
- Born: 19 October 1959 (age 67)
- Party: Pakistan Muslim League (N)

Punjab Assembly Lahore

Malik Sajjad Hussain Joiya is a Pakistani politician who was a Member of the Provincial Assembly of the Punjab, from 1988 to 1996 and again from May 2013 to May 2018.

== Early life ==
He was born on 19 October 1959.

== Political career ==
He was elected to the Provincial Assembly of the Punjab as a candidate of Islami Jamhoori Ittehad (IJI) from Constituency PP-173 (Multan-XIV) in the 1988 Pakistani general election. He received 24,384 votes and defeated Muhammad Akram Khan Kanjoo, a candidate of Pakistan Peoples Party (PPP).

He was re-elected to the Provincial Assembly of the Punjab as a candidate of IJI from Constituency PP-173 (Multan-XIV) in the 1990 Pakistani general election. He received 30,460 votes and defeated Malik Muhammad Aslam Khan, a candidate of Pakistan Democratic Alliance (PDA).

He was re-elected to the Provincial Assembly of the Punjab as a candidate of PPP from Constituency PP-173 (Multan-XIV) in the 1993 Pakistani general election. He received 37,349 votes and defeated Malik Muhammad Aslam Khan, a candidate of Pakistan Muslim League (N) (PML-N).

He ran for the seat of the Provincial Assembly of the Punjab as a candidate of PPP from Constituency PP-173 (Multan-XIV) in the 1997 Pakistani general election, but was unsuccessful. He received 24,839 votes and lost the seat to Muhammad Aslam Khan Joya, a candidate of PML-N.

He was re-elected to the Provincial Assembly of the Punjab as an independent candidate from Constituency PP-209 (Lodhran-III) in the 2013 Pakistani general election. He received 30,791 votes and defeated Mehmood Nawaz Joiya, a candidate of PML-N. He joined PML-N in May 2013.
