= Shazia Kamran =

Pakistani politician

Member of the Provincial Assembly of the Punjab
- In office 29 May 2013 – 31 May 2018
- Constituency: Reserved seat for women

Personal details
- Born: 8 March 1969 (age 57) Sahiwal
- Party: Pakistan Muslim League (N)

Shazia Kamran (Urdu: شازیہ کامران; born 8 March 1969) is a Pakistani politician who was a Member of the Provincial Assembly of the Punjab, from May 2013 to May 2018.

== Early life and education ==
She was born on 8 March 1969 in Sahiwal.

She graduated in 1991 from the University of the Punjab and received the degree of Bachelor of Arts.

== Political career ==
She was elected to the Provincial Assembly of the Punjab as a candidate of Pakistan Muslim League (N) on a reserved seat for women in the 2013 Pakistani general election.
