= Chaudhry Muhammad Asad Ullah =

Pakistani politician

Member of the Provincial Assembly of the Punjab
- In office 2008 – 31 May 2018
- Constituency: PP-106 (Hafizabad-II)

Personal details
- Born: 4 June 1968 (age 58) Jalalpur Bhattian
- Party: Pakistan Muslim League (N)

Chaudhry Muhammad Asad Ullah is a Pakistani politician who was a Member of the Provincial Assembly of the Punjab, from 2008 to May 2018.

== Early life and education ==
He was born on 4 June 1968 in Jalalpur Bhattian.

He has a degree of Bachelor of Law which he received in 1994 from University of the Punjab.

== Political career ==
He was elected to the Provincial Assembly of the Punjab as a candidate of Pakistan Muslim League (N) (PML-N) from Constituency PP-106 (Hafizabad-II) in the 2008 Pakistani general election. He received 40,072 votes and defeated Shaukat Ali Bhatti, a candidate of Pakistan Muslim League (Q) (PML-Q).

He was re-elected to the Provincial Assembly of the Punjab as a candidate of PML-N from Constituency PP-106 (Hafizabad-II) in the 2013 Pakistani general election. He received 51,543 votes and defeated an independent candidate, Rai Riasat Ali.

In December 2013, he was appointed as Parliamentary Secretary for food.
