= Sardar Bahadur Khan Maikan =

Pakistani politician

Member of the Provincial Assembly of the Punjab
- In office 29 May 2013 – 31 May 2018

Personal details
- Born: 5 February 1956 (age 70)
- Party: Pakistan Muslim League (Nawaz)

Sardar Bahadur Khan Maikan is a Pakistani politician who was a Member of the Provincial Assembly of the Punjab, from May 2013 to May 2018.

== Early life and education ==
He was born on 5 February 1956.

He has a degree of Bachelor of Arts which he obtained in 2005 from Allama Iqbal Open University.

== Political career ==
He was elected to the Provincial Assembly of the Punjab as an independent candidate from Constituency PP-38 (Sarghoda-XI) in the 2013 Pakistani general election. He joined Pakistan Muslim League (N) in May 2013.
