= Surriya Naseem =

Pakistani politician

Member of the Provincial Assembly of the Punjab
- In office 29 May 2013 – 31 May 2018
- Constituency: Reserved seat for women

Personal details
- Born: 10 November 1967 (age 59) Faisalabad
- Party: Pakistan Muslim League (N)

Surriya Naseem (Urdu: ثریا نسیم; born 10 November 1967) is a Pakistani politician who was a Member of the Provincial Assembly of the Punjab, from February 2007 to November 2007 and again from May 2013 to May 2018.

== Early life and education ==
She was born on 10 November 1967 in Faisalabad.

She earned the degree of Master of Arts in Urdu from Murray College in 1989. She also received the degrees of Bachelor of Education in 1990 and Master of Arts in Islamiat in 1998, both from the University of the Punjab.

== Political career ==
She was elected to the Provincial Assembly of the Punjab in February 2007, where she served until November 2007.

She was re-elected to the Provincial Assembly of the Punjab as a candidate of Pakistan Muslim League (N) on a reserved seat for women in the 2013 Pakistani general election.
