= Parveen Akhtar =

Pakistani politician

Member of the Provincial Assembly of the Punjab
- In office 29 May 2013 – 31 May 2018
- Constituency: Reserved seat for women

Personal details
- Born: 1 January 1957 (age 69) Okara, Pakistan
- Other political affiliations: Pakistan Muslim League (N)
- Spouse: Mian Atta Muhammad Manika

Parveen Akhtar (Urdu: پروین اختر; born 1 January 1957) is a Pakistani politician who was a Member of the Provincial Assembly of the Punjab, from May 2013 to May 2018.

== Early and personal life ==
She was born on 1 January 1957 in Okara, Pakistan.

She is wife of Mian Atta Muhammad Manika.

== Political career ==
She was elected to the Provincial Assembly of the Punjab as a candidate of Pakistan Muslim League (N) on a reserved seat for women in the 2013 Pakistani general election.
