= Muhammad Waheed Gull =

Pakistani politician

Member of the Provincial Assembly of the Punjab
- In office 29 May 2013 – 31 May 2018

Personal details
- Born: 1 January 1966 (age 60) Lahore
- Party: Pakistan Muslim League (Nawaz)

Muhammad Waheed Gull is a Pakistani politician who was a Member of the Provincial Assembly of the Punjab, from May 2013 to May 2018.

== Early life ==
He was born on 1 January 1966 in Lahore.

== Political career ==
He was elected to the Provincial Assembly of the Punjab as a candidate of Pakistan Muslim League (Nawaz) from Constituency PP-145 (Lahore-IX) in the 2013 Pakistani general election.
