= Malik Muhammad Waheed =

Pakistani politician (born 1972)

Member of the Provincial Assembly of the Punjab
- In office 16 August 2018 – 14 January 2023
- Constituency: PP-156 Lahore-XIII
- In office 29 May 2013 – 31 May 2018
- Constituency: PP-146 (Lahore-X)

Personal details
- Born: 1 August 1972 (age 54) Lahore, Punjab, Pakistan
- Party: PMLN (2010-present)

Malik Muhammad Waheed is a Pakistani politician who has been a Member of the Provincial Assembly of the Punjab since 2024. Previously, he served as Member of the Punjab Assembly twice, from May 2013 to May 2018 and from August 2018 till January 2023, 2023 to date.

== Early life and education ==
He was born on 1 August 1972 in Lahore. He received intermediate-level education.

== Political career ==
He was elected to the Provincial Assembly of the Punjab as a candidate of Pakistan Muslim League (Nawaz) (PML-N) from Constituency PP-146 (Lahore-X) in the 2013 Pakistani general election.

He was re-elected to the Provincial Assembly of the Punjab as a candidate of PML-N from Constituency PP-156 (Lahore-XIII) in the 2018 Pakistani general election.

He was re-elected to the Provincial Assembly of the Punjab as a candidate of PML-N from Constituency PP-152 Lahore-VIII in the 2024 Pakistani general election.

== Controversy ==
In March 2024, the Government of Punjab issued a show-cause notice to Waheed following the circulation of a video on social media depicting his altercation with a police officer. The incident occurred when the officer conducted a search of Waheed's vehicle in Lahore, prompting Waheed to exert pressure on him. Chief Minister of Punjab Maryam Nawaz also took notice of the issue and instructed Waheed to provide a response within three days.
