= Alia Aftab =

Pakistani politician

Member of the Provincial Assembly of the Punjab
- In office 29 May 2013 – 31 May 2018
- Constituency: Reserved seat for women

Personal details
- Born: 16 November 1965 (age 60) Lahore
- Party: Pakistan Muslim League (N)

Alia Aftab (Urdu: عالیہ آفتاب; born 16 November 1965) is a Pakistani politician who was a Member of the Provincial Assembly of the Punjab, from May 2013 to May 2018.

== Early life and education ==
She was born on 16 November 1965 in Lahore.

She earned the degree of Master of Science from the University of the Punjab in 1989 and earned a Doctor of Philosophy in 2007 from American Pacific University.

== Political career ==
She was elected to the Provincial Assembly of the Punjab as a candidate of Pakistan Muslim League (N) on a reserved seat for women in the 2013 Pakistani general election.
