= Nabila Hakim Ali Khan =

Pakistani politician

Member of the Provincial Assembly of the Punjab
- In office 29 May 2013 – 31 May 2018
- Constituency: Reserved seat for women

Personal details
- Born: 11 October 1970 (age 55) Sahiwal, Punjab, Pakistan
- Party: PTI (2013-present)

Nabila Hakim Ali Khan (Urdu: نبیلہ حاکم خاں; born 11 October 1970) is a Pakistani politician and Member of the Provincial Assembly of the Punjab from May 2013 to May 2018.

== Early life and education ==
Nabila Hakim Ali Khan was born on 11 October 1970 in Sahiwal.

She earned a Bachelor of Arts degree before graduated in 1999 from Bahauddin Zakariya University from where received a Bachelor of Laws degree.

== Political career ==
Nabila Hakim Ali Khan was elected to the Provincial Assembly of the Punjab as a candidate of Pakistan Tehreek-e-Insaf on a reserved seat for women in the 2013 Pakistani general election.
