= Chaudhry Yasin Sohal =

Pakistani politician

Member of the Provincial Assembly of the Punjab
- In office 15 August 2018 – 14 January 2023
- Constituency: PP-162 Lahore-XIX
- In office 2008 – 31 May 2018
- Constituency: PP-156 (Lahore-XX)

Personal details
- Born: 6 September 1965 (age 61) Vehari, Punjab, Pakistan
- Party: PMLN (2008-present)

Chaudhry Muhammad Yasin Sohal is a Pakistani politician who was a member of the Provincial Assembly of the Punjab from August 2018 till January 2023. Previously, he was a member of the Punjab Assembly from 2008 to May 2018.

== Early life and education ==
He was born on 6 September 1965 in Vehari.

He has a Bachelor of Laws degree, which he obtained from University of the Punjab.

== Political career ==
He was elected to the Provincial Assembly of the Punjab as a candidate of PML-N from Constituency PP-156 (Lahore-XX) in the 2008 Pakistani general election. He received 27,873 votes and defeated Malik Asif Jehangir, a candidate of Pakistan Peoples Party.

He was re-elected to the Provincial Assembly of the Punjab as a candidate of PML-N from Constituency PP-156 (Lahore-XX) in the 2013 Pakistani general election. He received 48,227 votes and defeated Ahsan Rasheed, a candidate of Pakistan Tehreek-e-Insaf (PTI).

He was re-elected to Provincial Assembly of the Punjab as a candidate of PML-N from Constituency PP-162 (Lahore-XIX) in the 2018 Pakistani general election after defeating PTI’s Abdul Aleem Khan.
