= Rana Muhammad Iqbal Harnah =

Pakistani politician

Member of the Provincial Assembly of the Punjab
- In office 2008 – 31 May 2018

Personal details
- Born: 1 January 1937 (age 89) Sialkot
- Party: Pakistan Muslim League (N)
- Children: Rana Muhammad Arif Iqbal Harnah (son)

Rana Muhammad Iqbal Harnah is a Pakistani politician who was a Member of the Provincial Assembly of the Punjab, from 2008 to May 2018.

== Early life ==
He was born on 1 January 1937 in Sialkot.

== Political career ==
He was elected to the Provincial Assembly of the Punjab as a candidate of Pakistan Muslim League (N) (PML-N) from Constituency PP-121 (Sialkot-I) in by-polls held in July 2008. He received 35,805 votes and defeated Chaudhry Sagheer Sultan, an independent candidate.

He was re-elected to the Provincial Assembly of the Punjab as a candidate of PML-N from Constituency PP-121 (Sialkot-I) in the 2013 Pakistani general election.
