= Malik Zulqarnain Dogar =

Pakistani politician (born 1960)

Zulqarnain Dogar

Member of the Provincial Assembly of the Punjab
- In office 29 May 2013 – 31 May 2018

Personal details
- Born: 6 January 1960 (age 66) Sheikhupura
- Party: Pakistan Muslim League (N)

Malik Zulqarnain Dogar is a Pakistani politician who had been a Member of the Provincial Assembly of the Punjab, between 1997 and May 2018.

== Early life and education ==
He was born on 6 January 1960 in Sheikhupura, Pakistan.

He has the degree of Bachelor of Laws LL. B. which he received in 1990 from Punjab Law College.

== Political career ==
He was elected to the Provincial Assembly of the Punjab as a candidate of Pakistan Muslim League (N) (PML-N) from Constituency PP-143 (Sheikhupura-X) in the 1997 Pakistani general election. He received 12,648 votes and defeated Rai Asghar Ali Khan, an independent candidate.

He was re-elected to the Provincial Assembly of the Punjab as a candidate of Pakistan Muslim League (Q) (PML-Q) from Constituency PP-172 (Sheikhupura-XI) in the 2002 Pakistani general election. He received 33,497 votes and defeated Chaudhry Tahir Meraj Gujjar, a candidate of PML-N.

He ran for the seat of the Provincial Assembly of the Punjab as a candidate of PML-Q from Constituency PP-172 (Nankana Sahib-III) in the 2008 Pakistani general election, but was unsuccessful. He received 17,881 votes and lost the seat to Shah Jehan Ahmad Bhatti, a candidate of Pakistan Peoples Party (PPP).

He was re-elected to the Provincial Assembly of the Punjab as a candidate of PML-N from Constituency PP-172 (Nankana Sahib-III) in the 2013 Pakistani general election. He received 29,032 votes and defeated an independent candidate, Shahzad Khalid Khan.
