= Fozia Ayub Qureshi =

Pakistani politician

Member of the Provincial Assembly of the Punjab
- In office 29 May 2013 – 31 May 2018
- Constituency: Reserved seat for women

Personal details
- Born: 16 August 1963 (age 63) Bahawalpur
- Party: Pakistan Muslim League (N)

Fozia Ayub Qureshi (Urdu: فوزیہ ایوب قریشی; born 16 August 1963) is a Pakistani politician who was a member of the Provincial Assembly of the Punjab, from May 2013 to May 2018.

== Early life and education ==
She was born on 16 August 1963 in Bahawalpur.

She has completed intermediate level education. FAMILY: HASEEB QURESHI (SON)

== Political career ==
She was elected to the Provincial Assembly of the Punjab as a candidate of Pakistan Muslim League (N) on a reserved seat for women in the 2013 Pakistani general election.
