= Muhammad Rafique (politician, born 1941) =

Pakistani politician

Member of the Provincial Assembly of the Punjab
- In office 2008 – 31 May 2018

Personal details
- Born: 10 December 1941 (age 84) Toba Tek Singh
- Party: Pakistan Muslim League (N)

Muhammad Rafique is a Pakistani politician who was a Member of the Provincial Assembly of the Punjab, from 1985 to 1988 and again from 2008 to May 2018.

== Early life and education ==
He was born on 10 December 1941 in Toba Tek Singh.

He graduated from Government College University in 1963 and has the degree of Bachelor of Arts.

== Political career ==
He was elected to the Provincial Assembly of the Punjab from Constituency PP-89 (Toba Tek Singh) in the 1985 Pakistani general election.

He ran for the seat of the Provincial Assembly of the Punjab as a candidate of Pakistan Peoples Party from Constituency PP-90 (Toba Tek Singh-VII) in the 2002 Pakistani general election, but was unsuccessful. He received 22,751 votes and lost the seat to an independent candidate, Liaquat Ali Shoukat.

He was re-elected to the Provincial Assembly of the Punjab as a candidate of Pakistan Muslim League (N) (PML-N) from Constituency PP-90 (Toba Tek Singh-VII) in the 2008 Pakistani general election. He received 39,539 votes and defeated a candidate of Pakistan Muslim League (Q).

He was re-elected to the Provincial Assembly of the Punjab as a candidate of PML-N from Constituency PP-90 (Toba Tek Singh-VII) in the 2013 Pakistani general election.
