= Al-Nejmeh =

Al-Nejmeh (Arabic: النجمة), Arabic for "the Star", may refer to:

- Nejmeh SC, a Lebanese football club
- Al-Najma SC (Bahrain), a Bahraini multi-sports club
- Al-Najma SC (Iraq), an Iraqi football club
- Al-Najma SC (Saudi Arabia), a Saudi Arabian football club
- Annajma SC, a Libyan football club
