= Rana Muhammad Arshad =

Pakistani politician (born 1970)

Member of the Provincial Assembly of the Punjab
- In office 2008 – 31 May 2018
- In office 2024–present

Personal details
- Born: 13 January 1970 (age 56) Sheikhupura, Punjab, Pakistan
- Party: PMLN (2008-present)

Rana Muhammad Arshad is a Pakistani politician who is a Member of the Provincial Assembly of the Punjab, from 2008 to May 2018 and 2024 to present.

== Early life and education ==
He was born on 13 January 1970 in Sheikhupura Pakistan.

He has a degree of Bachelor of Arts which he obtained in 1990 from University of the Punjab.

== Political career ==
He ran for the seat of the Provincial Assembly of the Punjab as a candidate of Pakistan Muslim League (N) (PML-N) from Constituency PP-171 (Nankana Sahib-II) in the 2002 Pakistani general election but was unsuccessful. He received 12,820 votes and lost the seat to Rai Ijaz Ahmed Khan, an independent candidate.

He was elected to the Provincial Assembly of the Punjab as a candidate of PML-N from Constituency PP-171 (Nankana Sahib-II) in by-polls held in June 2008. He received 22,715 votes and defeated Sardar Iftikhar Ahmad Dogar, a candidate of Pakistan Muslim League (Q).

He was re-elected to the Provincial Assembly of the Punjab as a candidate of PML-N from Constituency PP-171 (Nankana Sahib-II) in the 2013 Pakistani general election.

In December 2013, he was appointed as Parliamentary Secretary for Information and Culture.

In 2024, he is elected as a member of provincial assembly of Punjab as a PML-N candidate from constituency PP-133 (Nankana Sahib-II) in the Pakistani general election 2024 after receiving the notification from election commission Pakistan on 9 April. He won the seat against Mian M. Atif, a candidate of PTI.

He is the acting Chief Whip of the Punjab Assembly as per the last notifications.
