= Muhammad Yaqoob Nadeem Sethi =

Pakistani politician

Member of the Provincial Assembly of the Punjab
- In office 2008 – 31 May 2018

Personal details
- Born: 5 July 1970 (age 56) Kasur
- Party: Pakistan Muslim League (N)

Muhammad Yaqoob Nadeem Sethi is a Pakistani politician who was a Member of the Provincial Assembly of the Punjab, from 2008 to May 2018.

== Early life and education ==
He was born on 5 July 1970 in Kasur.

He graduated from Government Islamia Degree College.

== Political career ==
He ran for the seat of the Provincial Assembly of the Punjab as a candidate of Pakistan Muslim League (N) (PML-N) from Constituency PP-175 (Kasur-I) in the 2002 Pakistani general election but was unsuccessful. He received 18,547 votes and lost the seat to Muhammad Ilyas Khan, an independent candidate.

He was elected to the Provincial Assembly of the Punjab as a candidate of PML-N from Constituency PP-175 (Kasur-I) in the 2008 Pakistani general election. He received 20,032 votes and defeated Muhammad Ilyas Khan, a candidate of Pakistan Muslim League (Q).

He was re-elected to the Provincial Assembly of the Punjab as a candidate of PML-N from Constituency PP-175 (Kasur-I) in the 2013 Pakistani general election.
