= Mian Naveed Ali =

Pakistani politician

Member of the Provincial Assembly of the Punjab
- In office 15 August 2018 – 14 January 2023
- Constituency: PP-192 Pakpattan-II
- In office 29 May 2013 – 31 May 2018

Personal details
- Born: 14 June 1987 (age 39) Rahim Yar Khan, Punjab, Pakistan
- Party: Independent (2024-present)
- Other political affiliations: PMLN (2013-2024)

Mian Naveed Ali is a Pakistani politician who was a Member of the Provincial Assembly of the Punjab, from May 2013 to May 2018 and from August 2018 to January 2023.

== Early life and education ==
He was born on 14 June 1987 in Rahimyar Khan.

He graduated in 2007 from the Islamia University and has the degree of the Bachelor of Arts.

== Political career ==
He was elected to the Provincial Assembly of the Punjab as a candidate of Pakistan Muslim League (Nawaz) (PML-N) from Constituency PP-228 (Pakpattan-II) in the 2013 Pakistani general election.

In December 2013, he was appointed Parliamentary Secretary for labour & human resource.

He was re-elected to Provincial Assembly of the Punjab as a candidate of PML-N from Constituency PP-192 (Pakpattan-II) in the 2018 Pakistani general election.
