= Chaudhry Mohsin Ashraf =

Pakistani politician

Member of the Provincial Assembly of the Punjab
- In office December 2012 – 31 May 2018
- Constituency: PP-129 (Sialkot-IX)

Personal details
- Born: 29 October 1978 (age 48)
- Party: Pakistan Muslim League (N)

Chaudhry Mohsin Ashraf is a Pakistani politician who was a Member of the Provincial Assembly of the Punjab, from December 2012 to May 2018.

== Early life ==
He was born on 29 October 1978.

== Political career ==
He was elected to the Provincial Assembly of the Punjab as a candidate of Pakistan Muslim League (N) (PML-N) from Constituency PP-129 (Sialkot-IX) in by-polls held in December 2012. He received 52,195 votes and defeated a candidate of Pakistan Muslim League (Q).

He was re-elected to the Provincial Assembly of the Punjab as a candidate of PML-N from Constituency PP-129 (Sialkot-IX) in the 2013 Pakistani general election. He received 63,257 votes and defeated Fiaz Iqbal Cheema, a candidate of Pakistan Tehreek-e-Insaf (PTI).
