= Muhammad Mansha Ullah Butt =

Pakistani politician

Member of the Provincial Assembly of the Punjab
- In office 15 August 2018 – 14 January 2023
- Constituency: PP-37 Sialkot-III
- In office August 2013 – 31 May 2018
- Constituency: PP-123 (Sialkot-III)
- In office 1990–1999
- Constituency: PP-103 (Sialkot)
- Incumbent
- Assumed office 24 February 2024

Personal details
- Born: 30 June 1939 (age 87) Sialkot, Punjab, British India
- Party: PMLN (1993-present)

Muhammad Mansha Ullah Butt is a Pakistani politician who had been a member of the Provincial Assembly of the Punjab from August 2018 till January 2023. Previously, he was a member of the Punjab Assembly from 1990 to 1999 and again from August 2013 to May 2018.

== Early life and education ==
He was born on 30 June 1939 in Sialkot.

He has the degree of Bachelor of Arts.

== Political career ==
He was elected to the Provincial Assembly of the Punjab from Constituency PP-103 (Sialkot) in 1990 Pakistani general election. During his tenure as Member of the Punjab Assembly, he served as Parliamentary Secretary of Punjab for Labour.

He was re-elected to the Provincial Assembly of the Punjab from Constituency PP-103 (Sialkot) as a candidate of Pakistan Muslim League (N) (PML-N) in the 1993 Pakistani general election. He received 34,941 votes and defeated a candidate of Pakistan Peoples Party (PPP).

He was re-elected to the Provincial Assembly of the Punjab from Constituency PP-103 (Sialkot) as a candidate of PML-N in the 1997 Pakistani general election. He received 36,487 votes and defeated a candidate of PPP. He served as political secretary to the then Chief Minister of Punjab.

He was re-elected to the Provincial Assembly of the Punjab as a candidate of PML-N from Constituency PP-123 (Sialkot-III) in by-polls held in August 2013. In November 2016, he was inducted into the provincial Punjab cabinet of Chief Minister Shehbaz Sharif and was made Provincial Minister of Punjab for Local Government and Community Development.

He was re-elected to Provincial Assembly of the Punjab as a candidate of PML-N from Constituency PP-37 (Sialkot-III) in the 2018 Pakistani general election.
