= Muhammad Khan Baloch =

Pakistani politician

Muhammad Khan

Member of the Provincial Assembly of the Punjab
- In office March 2014 – 31 May 2018

Personal details
- Born: 1 January 1946 (age 80) Jhang
- Party: Pakistan Muslim League (Nawaz)

Muhammad Khan Baloch is a Pakistani politician who was a Member of the Provincial Assembly of the Punjab, from March 2014 to May 2018.

== Early life ==
He was born on 1 January 1946 in Jhang.

== Political career ==
He was elected to the Provincial Assembly of the Punjab as a candidate of Pakistan Muslim League (Nawaz) from Constituency PP-81 (Jhang-V-Cum-Chiniot) in by-polls held in March 2014.
