= Sobia Anwar Satti =

Pakistani politician

Member of the Provincial Assembly of the Punjab
- In office 29 May 2013 – 31 May 2018
- Constituency: Reserved seat for women

Personal details
- Born: 2 October 1982 (age 44) Rawalpindi
- Party: Pakistan Muslim League (N)

Sobia Anwar Satti (Urdu: ثوبیہ انور ستی) is a Pakistani politician who was a Member of the Provincial Assembly of the Punjab, from May 2013 to May 2018.

== Early life and education ==
She was born on 2 October 1982 in Rawalpindi.

She earned the degree of Master of Business Administration from Army Public College of Management Science, Rawalpindi in 2004.

== Political career ==
She was elected to the Provincial Assembly of the Punjab as a candidate of Pakistan Muslim League (N) on a reserved seat for women in the 2013 Pakistani general election.
