= Mian Muhammad Islam Aslam =

Pakistani politician

Member of the Provincial Assembly of the Punjab
- In office 29 May 2013 – 31 May 2018

Personal details
- Born: 2 May 1969 (age 57) Toba Tek Singh
- Party: PPP (2023–present)
- Other political affiliations: PMLN (2013–2023); PML-Q (2002–2013); PMLN (1997–2002); PPP (1988–1997)

Mian Muhammad Islam Aslam is a Pakistani politician who was a Member of the Provincial Assembly of the Punjab from May 2013 to May 2018.

== Life and career ==
Aslam was born on 2 May 1969 in Toba Tek Singh. He graduated in 1992 from the Islamia University and has the degree of Bachelor of Arts.

He belongs to Feroza which is situated in Liaquatpur tehsil.

Aslam was elected to the Provincial Assembly of the Punjab as a candidate of Pakistan Muslim League (Nawaz) from Constituency PP-287 (Rahimyar Khan-III) in the 2013 Pakistani general election.
