= Sahibzada Ghulam Nizam-ud-Din Sialvi =

Pakistani politician

Member of the Provincial Assembly of the Punjab
- In office 2008 – 31 May 2018

Personal details
- Born: 9 October 1980 (age 46) Sargodha
- Relations: Pir Hameeduddin Sialvi (uncle)

Sahibzada Ghulam Nizam-ud-Din Sialvi is a Pakistani politician who was a Member of the Provincial Assembly of the Punjab, from 2008 to May 2018.

== Early life and education ==
He was born on 9 October 1980 in Sargodha.

He has a degree of Bachelor of Arts which he obtained in 2008 from Al-Khair University, Sindh.

== Political career ==
He was elected to the Provincial Assembly of the Punjab as a candidate of Pakistan Muslim League (N) (PML-N) from Constituency PP-37 (Sarghoda-X) in the 2008 Pakistani general election. He received 31,539 votes and defeated Muhammad Ali Raza Lahri, an independent candidate.

He was re-elected to the Provincial Assembly of the Punjab as a candidate of PML-N from Constituency PP-37 (Sarghoda-X) in the 2013 Pakistani general election.

In December 2013, he was appointed as Parliamentary Secretary for livestock and dairy development.
