= Nawabzada Syed Shams Haider =

Pakistani politician

- Born: 23 December 1957 (age 68); Jhelum, Pakistan

Nawabzada Syed Shams Haider (born December 23, 1957) is a Pakistani politician of the Pakistan Muslim League (N). He is a former member of the Provincial Assembly of the Punjab from Jhelum. He is the son of Nawabzada Syed Maqbool Ahmed. He graduated from FC College in 1981 and obtained the degree of BBA in 1983 from . He comes of a prominent religious-cum-political family of the Punjab. His grandfather Nawab Sir Syed Mehr Shah and his granduncle Raja Ghazanfar Ali Khan had been Members of the Punjab Assembly; his close relatives have also been serving in the National as well as the Provincial Legislatures. He served as Member, District Council Jhelum for seven years. He remained Member, Provincial Assembly of the during 1993-96 and 1997–99; and also functioned as Parliamentary Secretary for Health during 1997–99. He has returned to the Punjab Assembly for the third term in general elections 2008.
