= Mahr Muhammad Kashif =

Pakistani politician (born 1976)

Muhammad Kashif

Member of the Provincial Assembly of the Punjab
- In office 15 August 2018 – 14 January 2023
- Constituency: PP-133 Nankana Sahib-III
- In office 29 May 2013 – 31 May 2018
- Constituency: PP-173 (Nankana Sahib-IV)

Personal details
- Born: 27 January 1976 (age 50) Nankana Sahib, Punjab, Pakistan
- Party: PMLN (2013-present)

Muhammad Kashif is a Pakistani politician who was a member of the Provincial Assembly of the Punjab from May 2013 to May 2018 and from August 2018 to January 2023.

== Early life and education ==
He was born on 27 January 1976 in Sheikhupura.

He has the degree of Bachelor of Science (Hons) in Economics which he obtained in 2000 from London School of Economics and Political Science and the degree of Master of Science in Economic Development and Planning which he received in 2006 from University College London.

== Political career ==
He was elected to the Provincial Assembly of the Punjab as a candidate of Pakistan Muslim League (Nawaz) (PML-N) from Constituency PP-173 (Nankana Sahib-IV) in the 2013 Pakistani general election.

He was re-elected to Provincial Assembly of the Punjab as a candidate of PML-N from Constituency PP-133 (Nankana Sahib-III) in the 2018 Pakistani general election.
