= Rukhsana Kokab =

Pakistani politician

Member of the Provincial Assembly of the Punjab
- In office 29 May 2013 – 31 May 2018
- Constituency: Reserved seat for women

Personal details
- Born: 25 September 1954 Lahore, Pakistan
- Died: 29 September 2020 (aged 66)
- Party: Pakistan Muslim League (N)

Rukhsana Kokab (Urdu: رخسانہ کوکب; born 25 September 1954 – 29 September 2020) was a Pakistani politician who was a Member of the Provincial Assembly of the Punjab, from May 2013 to May 2018.

== Early life ==
Rukhsana Kokab was born on 25 September 1954 in Lahore.

== Political career ==
She was elected to the Provincial Assembly of the Punjab as a candidate of Pakistan Muslim League (N) on a reserved seat for women in the 2013 Pakistani general election.

== Death ==
She died in Lahore on 29 September 2020 due to cardiac arrest.
