= Malik Fiaz Ahmad Awan =

Pakistani politician (born 1960)

Member of the Provincial Assembly of the Punjab
- In office 2008 – 31 May 2018

Personal details
- Born: 6 September 1960 (age 66) Hafizabad
- Party: Pakistan Muslim League (N)

Punjab Assembly Lahore

Malik Fiaz Ahmad Awan is a Pakistani politician who was a Member of the Provincial Assembly of the Punjab, from 2008 to May 2018. He was also an agriculturist.

== Early life and education ==
Awan was born on 6 September 1960 in Hafizabad.

He has the degree of Bachelor of Arts.

== Political career ==
Awan ran for the seat of the Provincial Assembly of the Punjab as an independent candidate from Constituency PP-79 (Gujranwala-III) in the 1990 Pakistani general election but was unsuccessful. He received 11,625 votes and lost the seat to Noor Muhammad, a candidate of Islami Jamhoori Ittehad (IJI).

He ran for the seat of the Provincial Assembly of the Punjab as an independent candidate from Constituency PP-79 (Hafizabad-I) in the 1993 Pakistani general election but was unsuccessful. He received 5,848 votes and lost the seat to Syed Muhammad Arif Hussain, a candidate of Pakistan Muslim League (N) (PML-N).

He ran for the seat of the Provincial Assembly of the Punjab as a candidate of Pakistan Peoples Party (PPP) from Constituency PP-105 (Hafizabad-I) in the 2002 Pakistani general election, but was unsuccessful. He received 24,638 votes and lost the seat to Muzaffar Ali Sheikh, a candidate of Pakistan Muslim League (Q) (PML-Q).

He was elected to the Provincial Assembly of the Punjab as a candidate of PPP from Constituency PP-105 (Hafizabad-I) in the 2008 Pakistani general election. He received 34,134 votes and defeated Haji Rai Riasat Ali, a candidate of PML-Q.

He was re-elected to the Provincial Assembly of the Punjab as a candidate of PML-N from Constituency PP-105 (Hafizabad-I) in the 2013 Pakistani general election. He received 55,021 votes and defeated an independent candidate, Muzaffar Ali Sheikh.
