= Mumtaz Ahmad Qaisrani =

Pakistani politician

Member of the Provincial Assembly of the Punjab
- In office August 2016 – 31 May 2018

Personal details
- Born: 14 October 1972 (age 54) Dera Ghazi Khan
- Party: Pakistan Muslim League (Nawaz)

Mumtaz Ahmad Qaisrani is a Pakistani politician who was a Member of the Provincial Assembly of the Punjab, from August 2016 to May 2018.

== Early life and education ==
He was born on 14 October 1972 in Dera Ghazi Khan.

He graduated from University of Balochistan.

== Political career ==
He was elected to the Provincial Assembly of the Punjab as a candidate of Pakistan Muslim League (Nawaz) from Constituency PP-240 (Dera Ghazi Khan-I) in by-polls held in August 2016.
