= Riaz Amanat Ali Virk =

Pakistani politician

Member of the Provincial Assembly of the Punjab
- In office 29 May 2013 – 31 May 2018
- Constituency: PP-101 (Gujranwala-XI)

Personal details
- Born: 1 January 1962 Nowshera Virkan Tehsil
- Party: Pakistan Muslim League (N)

Riaz Amanat Ali Virk (Urdu: ریاض امانت علی ورک; born 1 January 1962) is a Pakistani politician who had been a Member of the Provincial Assembly of the Punjab, from May 2013 to May 2018.

== Early life ==
Virk was born on 1 January 1962 in Nowshera Virkan Tehsil.

== Political career ==
She was elected to the Provincial Assembly of the Punjab as a candidate for Pakistan Muslim League (N) (PML-N) for Constituency PP-101 (Gujranwala-XI) in the 2013 Pakistani general election. She received 24,430 votes and defeated an independent candidate, Khalid Pervaz Virk.
