= Khola Amjad =

Pakistani politician

Member of the Provincial Assembly of the Punjab
- In office 29 May 2013 – 31 May 2018
- Constituency: Reserved seat for women

Personal details
- Born: 12 December 1952 (age 73) Multan
- Party: Pakistan Muslim League (N)

Khola Amjad (Urdu: خو لہ امجد; born 12 December 1952) is a Pakistani politician who was a Member of the Provincial Assembly of the Punjab, from May 2013 to May 2018.

== Early life and education ==
She was born on 12 December 1952 in Multan.

She earned Master Diploma in French from Alliance Française in 1976. She completed postgraduate diploma in Office Management from Bahauddin Zakariya University in 2000.

== Political career ==
She was elected to the Provincial Assembly of the Punjab as a candidate of Pakistan Muslim League (N) on a reserved seat for women in the 2013 Pakistani general election.
