= Naseem Lodhi =

Pakistani politician

Member of the Provincial Assembly of the Punjab
- In office 2002 – 31 May 2018
- Constituency: Reserved seat for women

Personal details
- Born: 15 September 1948 (age 78) Lahore
- Party: Pakistan Muslim League (N)

Naseem Lodhi (Urdu: نسیم لودھی; born 15 September 1948) is a Pakistani politician who was a Member of the Provincial Assembly of the Punjab, from 2002 to May 2018.

== Early life and education ==
She was born on 15 September 1948 in Lahore.

She earned the degree of the Bachelor of Business Administration in 2002.

== Political career ==
She was elected to the Provincial Assembly of the Punjab as a candidate for Pakistan Muslim League (Q) (PML-Q) on a reserved seat for women in the 2002 Pakistani general election and remained Provincial Minister of Punjab for Population Welfare from November 2003 to 2007.

She was re-elected to the Provincial Assembly of the Punjab as a candidate for PML-Q on a reserved seat for women in the 2008 Pakistani general election.

She was re-elected to the Provincial Assembly of the Punjab as a candidate for Pakistan Muslim League (N) on a reserved seat for women in the 2013 Pakistani general election.
