= Ayesha Javed =

Pakistani politician

Member of the Provincial Assembly of the Punjab
- In office 2008 – 31 May 2018
- Constituency: Reserved seat for women

Personal details
- Born: 12 October 1967 (age 59) Abbottabad
- Party: Pakistan Muslim League (N)

Ayesha Javed (Urdu: عائشہ جاوید; born 12 October 1967) is a Pakistani politician who was a Member of the Provincial Assembly of the Punjab, from 2008 to May 2018.

== Early life and education ==
She was born on 12 October 1967 in Abbottabad.

She has earned Master of Arts in Political Science in 1996 from University of the Punjab.

== Political career ==
She was elected to the Provincial Assembly of the Punjab as a candidate of Pakistan Muslim League (Q) on a reserved seat for women in the 2008 Pakistani general election.

She joined Pakistan Muslim League (N) (PML-N) in March 2013.

She was re-elected to the Provincial Assembly of the Punjab as a candidate of PML-N on a reserved seat for women in the 2013 Pakistani general election.
