= Chaudhry Rafaqat Hussain Gujjar =

Pakistani politician

Member of the Provincial Assembly of the Punjab
- In office 29 May 2013 – 31 May 2018

Personal details
- Born: 1 May 1975 (age 51) Gujranwala
- Party: Pakistan Muslim League (Nawaz)

Chaudhry Rafaqat Hussain Gujjar is a Pakistani politician who was a Member of the Provincial Assembly of the Punjab, from May 2013 to May 2018. His elder brother Haji Abdul Ghafoor was Chairman of his Union Council. Ch Muhammad Amin Gujjar coordinates the political matters of the constituency.

== Early life and education ==
He was born on 1 May 1975 in Naushehra Virkan, District Gujranwala

He has a degree of Bachelor of Arts and a degree of Bachelor of Law which he obtained in 1999 from University of the Punjab.

== Political career ==
He contested his first election in 2002 from PML(Q) and lose from very close margin. He was elected to the Provincial Assembly of the Punjab as a candidate of Pakistan Muslim League (Nawaz) from Constituency PP-102 (Gujranwala-XII) in the 2013 Pakistani general election.
