= Zill-e-Huma (Punjab politician) =

Pakistani politician

Member of the Provincial Assembly of the Punjab
- In office 2013 – 31 May 2018
- Constituency: Reserved seat for women
- In office 2008–2013
- Constituency: PP-8 (Rawalpindi-VIII)

Personal details
- Born: 7 November 1977 (age 49) Kharian
- Party: Pakistan Muslim League (N)

Zill-e-Huma (Urdu: ظل ہما) is a Pakistani politician who was a Member of the Provincial Assembly of the Punjab, from 2008 to May 2018.

== Early life and education ==
She was born on 7 November 1977 in Kharian.

She earned the degree of the Bachelor of Business Administration from Al-Khair University campus in Islamabad in 1999.

== Political career ==
Huma was elected to the Provincial Assembly of the Punjab as a candidate for Pakistan Muslim League (N) (PML-N) for Constituency PP-8 (Rawalpindi-VIII) in the 2008 Pakistani general election.

She was re-elected to the Provincial Assembly of the Punjab as a candidate of PML-N on a reserved seat for women in the 2013 Pakistani general election.
