= Sardar Khalid Mahmood Waran =

Pakistani politician

Member of the Provincial Assembly of the Punjab
- In office 29 May 2013 – 31 May 2018

Personal details
- Born: 1 January 1970 (age 56) Bahawalpur
- Party: Pakistan Muslim League (N)

Sardar Khalid Mahmood Waran is a Pakistani politician who was a Member of the Provincial Assembly of the Punjab, from 2002 to 2007 and again from May 2013 to May 2018.

== Early life and education ==
He was born on 1 January 1970 in Bahawalpur.

He has graduated from University of the Punjab.

== Political career ==
He was elected to the Provincial Assembly of the Punjab as a candidate of Pakistan Peoples Party from Constituency PP-269 (Bahawalpur-III) in the 2002 Pakistani general election. He received 34,122 votes and defeated a candidate of Pakistan Muslim League (Q) (PML-Q).

He ran for the seat of the Provincial Assembly of the Punjab as a candidate of PML-Q from Constituency PP-269 (Bahawalpur-III) in the 2008 Pakistani general election but was unsuccessful. He received 22,484 votes and lost the seat to Malik Jehan Zeb Warn, an independent candidate.

He was re-elected to the Provincial Assembly of the Punjab as a candidate of Pakistan Muslim League (N) from Constituency PP-269 (Bahawalpur-III) in the 2013 Pakistani general election.
