= Syed Abdul Aleem =

Pakistani politician

Member of the Provincial Assembly of the Punjab
- In office 2002–2007
- Constituency: PP244
- In office 29 May 2013 – 31 May 2018

Personal details
- Born: 24 April 1968 (age 58) Dera Ghazi Khan
- Party: Pakistan Muslim League (Nawaz)

Syed Abdul Aleem is a Pakistani politician who was a Member of the Provincial Assembly of the Punjab, from 2002 to 2007 then from May 2013 to May 2018.He was also a nazim from 2000 till 2001. Before that he was also involved in student politics and was president of the Muslim Student Federation Pakistan from 1997 till 1999.

== Early life and education ==
He was born on 24 April 1968 in Dera Ghazi Khan.

He completed his graduation in 1994 from University of the Punjab.

== Political career ==
He was elected to the Provincial Assembly of the Punjab as an independent candidate from Constituency PP-244 (Dera Ghazi Khan-V) in the 2013 Pakistani general election. He joined Pakistan Muslim League (N) in May 2013.
