= Shazia Tariq =

Pakistani politician

Member of the Provincial Assembly of the Punjab
- In office 29 May 2013 – 31 May 2018
- Constituency: Reserved seat for women

Personal details
- Born: 18 December 1983 (age 42) Gujranwala, Punjab, Pakistan
- Party: Pakistan Muslim League (N)

Shazia Tariq (Urdu: شازیہ طارق; born 18 December 1983) is a Pakistani politician who was a Member of the Provincial Assembly of the Punjab, from May 2013 to May 2018.

== Early life and education ==
She was born on 18 December 1983 in Gujranwala.

She earned the degree of Bachelor of Arts from Government College for Women, Gujranwala in 2003 and the degree of Bachelor of Education from Allama Iqbal Open University in 2007.

== Political career ==
She was elected to the Provincial Assembly of the Punjab as a candidate of Pakistan Muslim League (N) on a reserved seat for women in the 2013 Pakistani general election.
