= Muhammad Naeem Anwar =

Pakistani politician

Member of the Provincial Assembly of the Punjab
- In office 29 May 2013 – 31 May 2018

Personal details
- Born: 6 May 1957 (age 68) Bahawalnagar, Pakistan
- Party: Pakistan Muslim League (Z) (until 2023)

Muhammad Naeem Anwar is a Pakistani politician who was a Member of the Provincial Assembly of the Punjab, from May 2013 to May 2018.

== Early life and education ==
He was born on 6 May 1957 in Bahawalnagar.

He received matriculation level education.

== Political career ==
He was elected to the Provincial Assembly of the Punjab as a candidate of Pakistan Muslim League (Z) from Constituency PP-284 (Bahawalnagar-VIII) in the 2013 Pakistani general election.
