= Rana Munawar Hussain =

Pakistani politician

Member of the Provincial Assembly of the Punjab
- In office 15 August 2018 – 14 January 2023
- Constituency: PP-79 Sargodha-VIII
- In office 2008 – 31 May 2018

Personal details
- Born: 1 April 1972 (age 54) Sargodha, Punjab, Pakistan
- Party: PMLN (2008-present)

Rana Munawar Hussain (also known by the name Rana Munawar Ghous Khan) is a Pakistani politician who was a Member of the Provincial Assembly of the Punjab, from 2008 to May 2018 and from August 2018 to January 2023.

== Early life and education ==
He was born on 1 April 1972 in Sargodha.

He graduated from University of Sargodha in 1991.

== Political career ==
He was elected to the Provincial Assembly of the Punjab as a candidate of Pakistan Peoples Party from Constituency PP-36 (Sarghoda-IX) in the 2008 Pakistani general election. He received 33,221 votes and defeated Faisal Javaid Ghuman, a candidate of Pakistan Muslim League (Q).

He was re-elected to the Provincial Assembly of the Punjab as a candidate of Pakistan Muslim League (N) (PML-N) from Constituency PP-36 (Sarghoda-IX) in the 2013 Pakistani general election.

He was re-elected to Provincial Assembly of the Punjab as a candidate of PML-N from Constituency PP-79 (Sargodha-VIII) in the 2018 Pakistani general election.
