= Rana Ali Salman =

Ali Salman

Chairperson TEVTA
- In office 8 August 2019 – Present

Member of the Provincial Assembly of the Punjab
- In office 29 May 2013 – 31 May 2018

Personal details
- Born: 4 September 1975 (age 50) Lahore

Ali Salman is a Pakistani politician who was a Member of the Provincial Assembly of the Punjab, from May 2013 to May 2018.

== Early life and education ==
He was born on 4 September 1975 in Lahore.

He has a degree of Bachelor of Arts (Hons) in Economics and Development studies which he received in 1999 from University of Sussex and has a degree of Master of Laws in Law and Development which he obtained in 2001 from University of Warwick.

== Political career ==
He was elected to the Provincial Assembly of the Punjab as an independent candidate from Constituency PP-168 (Sheikhupura-Cum-Nanakana Sahib-I) in the 2013 Pakistani general election.
