= Lubna Rehan =

Pakistani politician

Member of the Provincial Assembly of the Punjab
- In office 29 May 2013 – 31 May 2018
- Constituency: Reserved seat for women

Personal details
- Born: 2 July 1979 (age 47) Lahore
- Party: Pakistan Muslim League (N)

Lubna Rehan (Urdu: لبنی ریحان; born 2 July 1979) is a Pakistani politician who was a Member of the Provincial Assembly of the Punjab, from May 2013 to May 2018.

== Early life and education ==
She was born on 2 July 1979 in Lahore.

She graduated in 2001 from the University of the Punjab and received a degree of Bachelor of Arts. She earned the degree of Bachelor of Education in 2007 from Allama Iqbal Open University.

== Political career ==
She was elected to the Provincial Assembly of the Punjab as a candidate of Pakistan Muslim League (N) on a reserved seat for women in the 2013 Pakistani general election.
