= Faiza Mushtaq =

Pakistani politician

Member of the Provincial Assembly of the Punjab
- In office May 2015 – 31 May 2018
- Constituency: Reserved seat for women

Personal details
- Born: 18 July 1981 (age 45) Mandi Bahauddin, Punjab, Pakistan
- Party: TLP (2025-present)
- Other political affiliations: PMLN (2015-2025)

Faiza Mushtaq (Urdu: فائزہ مشتاق; born 18 July 1981) is a Pakistani politician who was a Member of the Provincial Assembly of the Punjab, from May 2015 to May 2018.

== Early life and education ==
She was born on 18 July 1981 in Mandi Bahauddin.

She earned postgraduate degree in Human Resource Management from Institute of Administrative Sciences, Lahore in 2004.

== Political career ==
She ran for the seat of the Provincial Assembly of the Punjab as a candidate of Pakistan Muslim League (N) (PML-N) from Constituency PP-116 (Mandi Bahauddin-I) in the 2013 Pakistani general election but was unsuccessful.

In May 2015, she was elected to the Provincial Assembly of the Punjab as a candidate of PML-N on reserved seat for women.

She was re-elected to the Provincial Assembly of the Punjab as a candidate of PML-N on a reserved seat for women in the 2018 Pakistani general election.
