= Makhdoom Syed Ali Akbar Mehmood =

Pakistani politician

Member of the Provincial Assembly of the Punjab
- In office August 2013 – 31 May 2018
- Constituency: PP-292 (Rahim Yar Khan-VIII)

Personal details
- Born: 12 May 1963 (age 62) Karachi
- Party: Pakistan Peoples Party
- Relations: Syed Azam Mehmood Syed Usman Mehmood Syed Haider Mehmood (sons)

Makhdoom Syed Ali Akbar Mehmood (born 12 May 1963) is a Pakistani politician who was a member of the Provincial Assembly of the Punjab from August 2013 to May 2018.

== Early life and education ==
He was born on 12 May 1963 in Karachi.

He has the degree of Bachelor of Arts (Hons).

He is a Landlord. Most of his time he spent in his Mango Garden in Jamal Din Wali, RYK.

== Political career ==
He was elected to the Provincial Assembly of the Punjab as a candidate of Pakistan Peoples Party from Constituency PP-292 (Rahimyar Khan-VIII) in by-polls held in August 2013.
