= Zafar Iqbal (politician) =

Pakistani politician

Member of the Provincial Assembly of the Punjab
- In office 29 May 2013 – 31 May 2018

Personal details
- Born: 7 September 1959 (age 67) Attock District
- Party: Pakistan Muslim League (Nawaz)

Zafar Iqbal is a Pakistani politician who was a Member of the Provincial Assembly of the Punjab, from May 2013 to May 2018.

== Early life and education ==
He was born on 7 September 1959 in Attock District.

== Political career ==
He was elected to the Provincial Assembly of the Punjab as a candidate of Pakistan Muslim League (Nawaz) from Constituency PP-19 (Attock-V) in the 2013 Pakistani general election.
