= Chaudhry Mahmood ul Hassan =

Pakistani politician

Member of the Provincial Assembly of the Punjab
- In office 29 May 2013 – 31 May 2018

Personal details
- Born: 1 April 1971 (age 55)
- Party: Pakistan Muslim League (Nawaz)

Chaudhry Mahmood ul Hassan is a Pakistani politician who was a Member of the Provincial Assembly of the Punjab, from May 2013 to May 2018.

== Early life ==
He was born on 1 April 1971.

== Political career ==
He was elected to the Provincial Assembly of the Punjab as a candidate of Pakistan Muslim League (Nawaz) from Constituency PP-294 (Rahimyar Khan-X) in the 2013 Pakistani general election.
