= Farzana Nazir =

Pakistani politician

Member of the Provincial Assembly of the Punjab
- In office 29 May 2013 – 31 May 2018
- Constituency: Reserved seat for women

Personal details
- Born: 12 December 1965 (age 60)
- Party: Pakistan Muslim League (N)

Farzana Nazir (Urdu: فرزانہ نذیر; born 12 December 1965) is a Pakistani politician who was a Member of the Provincial Assembly of the Punjab, from 2002 to 2007 and again from May 2013 to May 2018.

== Early life and education ==
She was born on 12 December 1965.

She earned a Bachelor of Medicine and Bachelor of Surgery in 1990 from University of the Punjab.

== Political career ==
She was elected to the Provincial Assembly of the Punjab as a candidate of Pakistan Muslim League (Q) on a reserved seat for women in the 2002 Pakistani general election.

She was re-elected to the Provincial Assembly of the Punjab as a candidate of Pakistan Muslim League (N) on a reserved seat for women in the 2013 Pakistani general election.
