= Mumtaz Ahmad Maharwi =

Pakistani politician

Member of the Provincial Assembly of the Punjab
- In office 29 May 2013 – 31 May 2018

Personal details
- Born: 8 September 1955 (age 70) Chishtian, Punjab, Pakistan
- Party: PTI (2013-present)

Punja NJb Assembly Lahore

Mian Mumtaz Ahmad Maharwi is a Pakistani politician who was a Member of the Provincial Assembly of the Punjab, between 1988 and May 2018.

== Early life and education ==
He was born on 8 September 1955 in Chishtian.

He graduated from Government College, Lahore in 1973 and has the degree of Bachelor of Arts. He received the degree of Bachelor of Laws in 1976 from Punjab University Law College.

== Political career ==
He was elected to the Provincial Assembly of the Punjab as a candidate of Pakistan Peoples Party (PPP) from Constituency PP-228 (Bahawanagar-IV) in the 1988 Pakistani general election. He received 18,782 votes and defeated Mumtaz Ahmed, a candidate of Islami Jamhoori Ittehad (IJI).

He ran for the seat of the Provincial Assembly of the Punjab as a candidate of Pakistan Democratic Alliance (PDA) from Constituency PP-228 (Bahawanagar-IV) in 1990 Pakistani general election, but was unsuccessful. He received 26,603 votes and lost Muhammad Tahir Mehmood, the seat to a candidate of IJI.

He was re-elected to the Provincial Assembly of the Punjab as a candidate of PPP from Constituency PP-228 (Bahawanagar-IV) in the 1993 Pakistani general election. He received 33,704 votes and defeated Muhammad Tahir Mehmood, a candidate of Pakistan Muslim League (N) (PML-N). During his tenure as member of the Punjab Assembly, he served as Parliamentary Secretary for Revenue.

He ran for the seat of the Provincial Assembly of the Punjab as a candidate of PPP from Constituency PP-228 (Bahawanagar-IV) in the 1997 Pakistani general election, but was unsuccessful. He received 17,776 votes and lost the seat to Muhammad Jameel, a candidate of PML-N.

He was re-elected to the Provincial Assembly of the Punjab as a candidate of Pakistan Tehreek-e-Insaf (PTI) from Constituency PP-280 (Bahawanagar-IV) in the 2013 Pakistani general election. He received 17,558 votes and defeated Sajjad Ahmad Jhatol, a candidate of PML-N.
