= Ahmed Khan Baloch =

Pakistani politician

Member of the Provincial Assembly of the Punjab
- In office 29 May 2013 – 31 May 2018

Personal details
- Born: 1 January 1945 (age 81) Lodhran
- Party: Pakistan Muslim League (N)

Punjab Assembly Lahore

Ahmed Khan Baloch is a Pakistani politician who was a Member of the Provincial Assembly of the Punjab, between 1980 and May 2018.

== Early life and education ==
He was born on 1 January 1945 in Lodhran.

He has a degree of Bachelor of Arts.

== Political career ==
He was elected to the Provincial Assembly of the Punjab from Constituency PP-174 (Multan) in the 1985 Pakistani general election.

He was re-elected to the Provincial Assembly of the Punjab as a candidate of Islami Jamhoori Ittehad (IJI) from Constituency PP-170 (Multan-XI) in the 1988 Pakistani general election. He received 11,438 votes and defeated Muhammad Ayoub Khan Ghalu, a candidate of Pakistan Peoples Party (PPP).

He was re-elected to the Provincial Assembly of the Punjab as a candidate of IJI from Constituency PP-170 (Multan-XI) in the 1990 Pakistani general election. He received 35,161 votes and defeated Muhammad Irshad Abbas Ghalloo, a candidate of Pakistan Democratic Alliance (PDA).

He ran for the seat of the Provincial Assembly of the Punjab as a candidate of Pakistan Muslim League (N) (PML-N) from Constituency PP-170 (Lodhran-cum-Multan) in the 1993 Pakistani general election but was unsuccessful and lost the seat to Syed Akbar Ali Shah, a candidate of PPP.

He was re-elected to the Provincial Assembly of the Punjab as a candidate of PML-N from Constituency PP-170 (Lodhran-cum-Multan) in the 1997 Pakistani general election. He received 33,460 votes and defeated Syed Akbar Ali Shah, a candidate of PPP.

He was re-elected to the Provincial Assembly of the Punjab as a candidate of Pakistan Muslim League (Q) (PML-Q) from Constituency PP-211 (Lodhran-V) in the 2008 Pakistani general election. He received 32012 votes and defeated Izat Javid Khan, a candidate of PPP.

He was re-elected to the Provincial Assembly of the Punjab as an independent candidate from Constituency PP-211 (Lodhran-V) in the 2013 Pakistani general election. He received 32,717 votes and defeated Ezat Javaid Khan, a candidate of Pakistan Tehreek-e-Insaf (PTI). He joined PML-N in May 2013.
