= Chaudhry Muhammad Ashraf Warraich =

Pakistani politician

Member of the Provincial Assembly of the Punjab
- In office 29 May 2013 – 31 May 2018

Personal details
- Born: 20 September 1952 (age 74) Gujranwala
- Party: Pakistan Muslim League (Nawaz)

Chaudhry Muhammad Ashraf Warraich is a Pakistani politician who was a Member of the Provincial Assembly of the Punjab, from May 2013 to May 2018.

== Early life and education ==
He was born on 20 September 1952 in Gujranwala.

He has a degree of Bachelor of Arts and a degree of Bachelor of Law.

== Political career ==
He was elected to the Provincial Assembly of the Punjab as a candidate of Pakistan Muslim League (Nawaz) from Constituency PP-97 (Gujranwala-VII) in the 2013 Pakistani general election.
