= Muhammad Ilyas Ansari =

Pakistani politician

Haji Muhammad Ilyas Ansari

Member of the Provincial Assembly of the Punjab
- In office 29 May 2013 – 31 May 2018

Personal details
- Born: 25 August 1969 (age 57) Faisalabad
- Party: Pakistan Muslim League (Nawaz)

Haji Muhammad Ilyas Ansari is a Pakistani politician who was a Member of the Provincial Assembly of the Punjab, from May 2013 to May 2018.

== Early life and education ==
He was born on 25 August 1969 in Faisalabad.

He has completed matriculation education in 1985.

== Political career ==
He was elected to the Provincial Assembly of the Punjab as a candidate of Pakistan Muslim League (Nawaz) from Constituency PP-65 (Faisalabad-XV) in the 2013 Pakistani general election.

In December 2013, he was appointed as Parliamentary Secretary for social welfare and Baitul Mal.
