= Qazi Ahmad Saeed =

Pakistani politician

Member of the Provincial Assembly of the Punjab
- In office 2002 – 31 May 2018
- Incumbent
- Assumed office 24 February 2024

Personal details
- Born: 1 June 1968 (age 58) Rahim Yar Khan, Punjab, Pakistan
- Party: PPP (2013-present)

Qazi Ahmad Saeed is a Pakistani politician who was a Member of the Provincial Assembly of the Punjab, from 2002 to May 2018. He was re-elected as the member of Punjab assembly in 2024 Pakistani general election.

== Early life and education ==
He was born on 1 June 1968 in Rahim Yar Khan District.

He has a Bachelor of Laws which he obtained in 1993 from University of Karachi and a degree of Master of Arts which he received in 1995 from Shah Abdul Latif University.

== Political career ==
He was elected to the Provincial Assembly of the Punjab as a candidate of Pakistan Muslim League (Q) (PML-Q) from Constituency PP-286 (Rahimyar Khan-II) in the 2002 Pakistani general election. He received 29,130 votes and defeated an independent candidate.

He was re-elected to the Provincial Assembly of the Punjab as a candidate of Pakistan Muslim League (F) from Constituency PP-286 (Rahimyar Khan-II) in the 2008 Pakistani general election. He received 26,715 votes and defeated a candidate of PML-Q.

He was re-elected to the Provincial Assembly of the Punjab as a candidate of Pakistan Peoples Party from Constituency PP-286 (Rahimyar Khan-II) in the 2013 Pakistani general election.
