= Muhammad Arshad Malik =

Pakistani politician

Member of the Provincial Assembly of the Punjab
- In office 15 August 2018 – 14 January 2023
- Constituency: PP-198 Sahiwal-III
- In office 29 May 2013 – 31 May 2018

Personal details
- Born: 18 April 1973 (age 53) Sahiwal, Punjab, Pakistan
- Party: PMLN

Muhammad Arshad Malik is a Pakistani politician who was a Member of the Provincial Assembly of the Punjab, from May 2013 to May 2018 and from August 2018 to January 2023.

== Early life and education ==
He was born on 18 April 1973 in Sahiwal.

He has the degree of Bachelor of Arts and the degree of Bachelor of Laws which he received from Bahauddin Zakariya University in 2009.

== Political career ==
He was elected to the Provincial Assembly of the Punjab as a candidate of Pakistan Muslim League (Nawaz) (PML-N) from Constituency PP-222 (Sahiwal-III) in the 2013 Pakistani general election.

He was re-elected to Provincial Assembly of the Punjab as a candidate of PML-N from Constituency PP-198 (Sahiwal-III) in the 2018 Pakistani general election. His son Hassan Ramzan is studying in Aitchison College.
