= Shafqat Mahmood (politician) =

Member of the Provincial Assembly of the Punjab
- In office 29 May 2013 – 31 May 2018

Personal details
- Born: 1 January 1971 (age 55) Mandi Bahauddin
- Party: Pakistan Muslim League (Nawaz)

Shafqat Mahmood is a Pakistani politician who was a Member of the Provincial Assembly of the Punjab, from May 2013 to May 2018.

== Early life and education ==
He was born on 1 January 1971 in Mandi Bahauddin.

He has a degree of Master of Science which he obtained in 1995 from University of the Punjab.

== Political career ==
He was elected to the Provincial Assembly of the Punjab as a candidate of Pakistan Muslim League (Nawaz) from Constituency PP-119 (Mandi Bahauddin-IV) in the 2013 Pakistani general election.
