= Javed Akhtar Khan Lund =

Pakistani politician (born 1962)

Member of the Provincial Assembly of the Punjab
- In office 15 August 2018 – 14 January 2023
- Constituency: PP-287 Dera Ghazi Khan-III

Personal details
- Born: 21 March 1962 (age 64) Dera Ghazi Khan, Punjab, Pakistan
- Party: PTI (2018-present)

Javed Akhtar Khan (born 21 March 1962) is a Pakistani politician who was a Member of the Provincial Assembly of the Punjab from 2002 to 2007, from May 2013 to May 2018, and from August 2018 till January 2023 .

== Early life and education ==
He was born on 21 March 1962 in Shadan Lound.

He received a degree of Bachelor of Arts from Bahauddin Zakariya University and a degree of Master of Arts in Economics from University of Balochistan in 1987.

== Political career ==
He was elected to the Provincial Assembly of the Punjab as a candidate of National Alliance from Constituency PP-242 (Dera Ghazi Khan-III) in the 2002 Pakistani general election. He received 17,796 votes and defeated an independent candidate, Salahuddin Khan Khosa.

He ran for the seat of the Provincial Assembly of the Punjab as a candidate of Pakistan Muslim League (Q) from Constituency PP-242 (Dera Ghazi Khan-III) in the 2008 Pakistani general election but was unsuccessful. He received 17,142 votes and lost the seat to Amjad Farooq Khan.

He was elected to the Provincial Assembly of the Punjab as an independent candidate from Constituency PP-242 (Dera Ghazi Khan-III) in the 2013 Pakistani general election. He joined Pakistan Muslim League (N) in May 2013.

He was re-elected to Provincial Assembly of the Punjab as a candidate of Pakistan Tehreek-e-Insaf from Constituency PP-287 (Dera Ghazi Khan-III) in the 2018 Pakistani general election.
