= Shameela Aslam =

Pakistani politician

Member of the Provincial Assembly of the Punjab
- In office 2008 – 31 May 2018
- Constituency: Reserved seat for women

Personal details
- Born: Multan
- Party: Pakistan Muslim League (N)

Shameela Aslam (Urdu: شمیلہ اسلم) is a Pakistani politician who was a Member of the Provincial Assembly of the Punjab, from 2008 to May 2018.

== Early life and education ==
She was born in Multan.

She earned the degree of Bachelor of Education in 1985 and the degree of Master of Arts in Islamic Studies in 1989 from Bahauddin Zakariya University.

== Political career ==
She was elected to the Provincial Assembly of the Punjab as a candidate of Pakistan Muslim League (N) (PML-N) on a reserved seat for women in the 2008 Pakistani general election.

She was re-elected to the Provincial Assembly of the Punjab as a candidate of PML-N on a reserved seat for women in the 2013 Pakistani general election.
