= Sardar Muhammad Nawaz Khan =

Pakistani politician

Member of the Provincial Assembly of the Punjab
- In office 29 May 2013 – 31 May 2018

Personal details
- Born: 4 June 1948 (age 78) Rahim Yar Khan
- Party: PPP (2023–present)
- Other political affiliations: PML–N (2013–2023); PML–Q (2002–2013); PMLN (1997–2002); PPP (1988–1997)

Sardar Muhammad Nawaz Khan rind is a Pakistani politician who was a Member of the Provincial Assembly of the Punjab, from 1993 to 1997 and again from May 2013 to May 2018.

== Early life and education ==
He was born on 4 June 1948 in Zahir Pir.

He has a degree of Bachelor of Laws which he obtained in 2007 from Allama Iqbal Open University.

== Political career ==
He ran for the seat of the Provincial Assembly of the Punjab as a candidate of Pakistan Democratic Alliance (PDA) from Constituency PP-234 (Rahimyar Khan-III) in the 1990 Pakistani general election, but was unsuccessful. He received 17,123 votes and lost the seat to Mian Abdul Sattar.

He was elected to the Provincial Assembly of the Punjab as a candidate of Pakistan Peoples Party (PPP) from Constituency PP-234 (Rahimyar Khan-III) in the 1993 Pakistani general election. He received 29,284 votes and defeated Mian Abdul Sattar.

He ran for the seat of the Provincial Assembly of the Punjab as a candidate of PPP from Constituency PP-234 (Rahimyar Khan-III) in the 2002 Pakistani general election, but was unsuccessful. He received 26,257 votes and lost the seat to Mian Abdul Sattar.

He was re-elected to the Provincial Assembly of the Punjab as an independent candidate from Constituency PP-288 (Rahimyar Khan-IV) in the 2013 Pakistani general election. He joined Pakistan Muslim League (N) in May 2013.
