= Chaudhry Shabbir Ahmed =

Pakistani politician

Chaudhry Shabbir Ahmad

Member of the Provincial Assembly of the Punjab
- In office 29 May 2013 – 31 May 2018

Personal details
- Born: 15 January 1970 (age 56) Gujrat District
- Party: Pakistan Muslim League (Nawaz)

Chaudhry Shabbir Ahmed is a Pakistani politician who was a Member of the Provincial Assembly of the Punjab, from May 2013 to May 2018.

== Early life and education ==
He was born on 15 January 1970 in Gujrat District.

He has completed Matriculate education.

== Political career ==
He was elected to the Provincial Assembly of the Punjab as a candidate of Pakistan Muslim League (Nawaz) from Constituency PP-115 (Gujrat-VIII) in the 2013 Pakistani general election.
