= Muhammad Arif Khan Sindhila =

Pakistani politician

Member of the Provincial Assembly of the Punjab
- In office 29 May 2013 – 31 May 2018

Personal details
- Born: 1 May 1958 (age 68) Sheikhupura
- Party: Pakistan Muslim League (Nawaz)

Muhammad Arif Khan Sindhila is a Pakistani politician who was a Member of the Provincial Assembly of the Punjab, from May 2013 to May 2018.

== Early life and education ==
He was born on 1 May 1958 in Sheikhupura.

He graduated from University of the Punjab and has the degree of Bachelor of Arts. He hold a Diploma in Interior Designing and Construction from Le Chalit in France.

== Political career ==
He was elected to the Provincial Assembly of the Punjab as a candidate of Pakistan Muslim League (Nawaz) from Constituency PP-167 (Sheikhupura-VI) in the 2013 Pakistani general election.
