= Muhammad Arif Abbasi =

Pakistani politician

Member of the Provincial Assembly of the Punjab
- In office 29 May 2013 – 31 May 2018

Personal details
- Born: 12 February 1965 (age 61) Rawalpindi, Punjab, Pakistan
- Party: PTI (2013-present)

Muhammad Arif Abbasi is a Pakistani politician who was a Member of the Provincial Assembly of the Punjab, from May 2013 to May 2018.

== Early life and education ==
He was born on 12 February 1965.

He received the Diploma of Associate Engineers from the School of Aeronautics in Karachi in 1987.

== Political career ==
He was elected to the Provincial Assembly of the Punjab as a candidate of Pakistan Tehreek-e-Insaf from Constituency PP-13 (Rawalpindi-XIII) in the 2013 Pakistani general election.
