= Tehseen Fawad =

Pakistani politician

Member of the Provincial Assembly of the Punjab
- In office 29 May 2013 – 31 May 2018
- Constituency: Reserved seat for women

Personal details
- Born: 13 November 1959 (age 66) Lahore
- Party: Pakistan Muslim League (N)

Tehseen Fawad (Urdu: تحسین فواد) is a Pakistani politician who was a Member of the Provincial Assembly of the Punjab, from May 2013 to May 2018.

== Early and personal life ==
She was born on 13 November 1959 in Lahore.

She is married and has five children.

She is a social worker by profession and had been Executive Member of Aurat Foundation in 1998.

== Political career ==
She had been a Member of the Rawal Town Tehsil from 2005 to 2008 and Member of Bait-ul-Maal Rawalpindi District from 2011 to 2013.

She was elected to the Provincial Assembly of the Punjab as a candidate of Pakistan Muslim League (N) on a reserved seat for women in the 2013 general election.

On 13 May 2024, the Election Commission of Pakistan (ECP) suspended her membership as a member of the Provincial Assembly of the Punjab. This action followed a Supreme Court of Pakistan decision to suspend the verdict of the Peshawar High Court, which had denied the allocation of a reserved seat to the PTI-Sunni Ittehad Council bloc.
