= Chaudhry Irshad Ahmad Arain =

Pakistani politician

Member of the Provincial Assembly of the Punjab
- In office 29 May 2013 – 31 May 2018

Personal details
- Born: 1 January 1953 (age 73) Burewala, Punjab, Pakistan
- Other political affiliations: Pakistan Muslim League (Nawaz)

Chaudhry Irshad Ahmad Arain is a Pakistani politician who was a Member of the Provincial Assembly of the Punjab, from May 2013 to May 2018.

== Early life and education ==
Ch Irshad Ahmad Arain was born in 1953 at Burewala. He is son of Haji Ch Sardar Muhammad Arain. He is a graduate. As businessman, he is running his transport business. He has travelled to United Kingdom and Saudi Arabia.

== Political career ==
He served the people of Burewala as Councillor Union Council during 1987–88; as Chairman Market Committee Burewala during 2001-02 and as Member Provincial Assembly of the Punjab in general elections 2013. He was elected to the Provincial Assembly of the Punjab as a candidate of Pakistan Muslim League (Nawaz) from Constituency PP-233 (Vehari-II) in the 2013 Pakistani general election. In the 2018 General Elections, he contested as candidate of member Provincial Assembly. In the 2024 General Elections, he contested as candidate of member National Assembly. He is still an active politician and serving his people.
