= Najma Begum =

Pakistani politician

Member of the Provincial Assembly of the Punjab
- In office 29 May 2013 – 31 May 2018
- Constituency: Reserved seat for women

Personal details
- Born: 4 February 1967 (age 59) Dera Ghazi Khan
- Party: Pakistan Muslim League (N)

Najma Begum (Urdu: نجمہ بیگم; born 4 February 1967) is a Pakistani politician who was a Member of the Provincial Assembly of the Punjab, from May 2013 to May 2018.

== Early life and education ==
She was born on 4 February 1967 in Dera Ghazi Khan, and completed her graduation in 2014 from Allama Iqbal Open University.

== Political career ==
She was elected to the Provincial Assembly of the Punjab as a candidate of Pakistan Muslim League (N) on a reserved seat for women in the 2013 Pakistani general election.
