= Najma Afzal Khan =

Pakistani politician

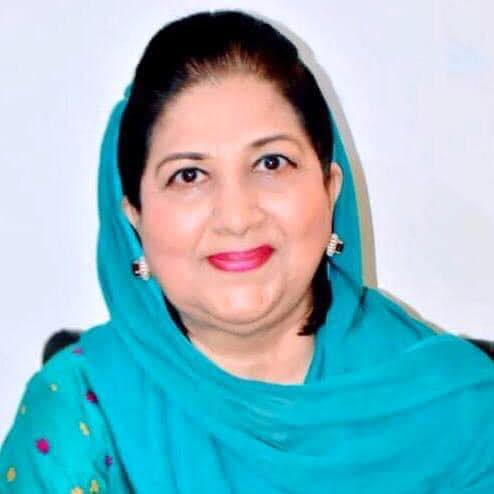

Member of the Provincial Assembly of the Punjab
- In office 29 May 2013 – 31 May 2018
- Constituency: Reserved seat for women

Personal details
- Born: 1 October 1950 (age 76) Faisalabad
- Party: Pakistan Muslim League (N)
- Spouse: Rana Afzal Khan

Dr. Najma Afzal Khan (Urdu: نجمہ افضل خان; born 1 October 1950) is a Pakistani politician, doctor and philanthropist who was a Member of the Provincial Assembly of the Punjab, from May 2013 to May 2018. She has also founded and run various charitable organizations to help impoverished young people.

== Early life and education ==
She was born on 1 October 1950 in Faisalabad.

She earned a degree of Bachelor of Medicine and Bachelor of Surgery in 1976 from the Liaquat University of Medical and Health Sciences.

== Medical and Business career ==
Khan helped found the Saahil Group, a healthcare, energy, manufacturing, and real estate company, with her husband, Rana Afzal Khan. She established Saahil Hospital in Faisalabad.

== Political career ==
She was elected to the Provincial Assembly of the Punjab as a candidate of Pakistan Muslim League (N) on a reserved seat for women in the 2013 Pakistani general election.

She was married to Rana Afzal Khan, PML-N leader and Minister of Finance and Economic Affairs in the Abassi Cabinet, until his death on 27 September 2019.

== Awards and recognition ==
Khan has won approximately 50 awards for her Medical and Charitable Work.
