= Sahiwal Division =

Administrative division in Punjab, Pakistan

Sahiwal Division ساہیوال ڈویژن
- Division
- Location of Sahiwal (in red) in Punjab, Pakistan and (inset) Punjab in Pakistan.
- Coordinates: 30°39′52″N 73°6′30″E
- Country: Pakistan
- Province: (Punjab, Pakistan) Punjab
- Capital: Sahiwal
- Established: 14 November 2008
- Districts: 3

Government
  - Type: Divisional Administration
  - Commissioner: Shoaib Iqbal
  - Regional Police Officer: N/A

Area
  - Division: 10,302 km^{2} (3,978 sq mi)

Population (2023)
  - Division: 8,533,471
  - Density: 828.33/km^{2} (2,145.4/sq mi)
  - Urban: 2,417,710 (28.33%)
  - Rural: 6,115,761
- Combined population of all Districts of Sahiwal

Main language(s)

Literacy
  - Literacy rate: Total: (61.02%); Male: (67.61%); Female: (54.18%)
- Time zone: UTC+5 (PST)
- Postal code: 57000
- Dialling code: 040
- Website: sahiwaldivision.punjab.gov.pk

Sahiwal Division (Punjabi, Urdu: ساہیوال) is one of the ten Divisions of Pakistan's Punjab province. Sahiwal Division is situated in east-central Punjab, along the N-5 National Highway, roughly equidistant from Lahore and Multan. It is bordered by Faisalabad Division to the west, Lahore Division to the north, Bahawalpur Division and India to the east, and Multan Division to the south. The division is located on the floodplains of two major rivers: the Ravi River to the west and the Sutlej River to the east. Additionally, the dry Khushak Bias channel traverses the region, forming a natural boundary between Sahiwal District and Pakpattan District. With an elevation of approximately 500 ft (150 m) above sea level, parts of the division rise to over 200 meters, contributing to its varied topography.

== History ==
It was formed by merging parts of Lahore Division and Multan Division and took its name Sahiwal from the district and city of the same name. On 14 November 2008, Sahiwal Division was reorganized into three districts: Sahiwal District, Okara District, and Pakpattan District. Sahiwal is the capital of the Sahiwal Division. In 1998, the population of Sahiwal was 6,271,247. The population rate of growth was 1.92 percent per annum.

About 18 miles (29 km) southwest of Sahiwal is Harappa, an ancient city of the Indus Valley Civilization. About 28 miles (45 km) west of Sahiwal, at Kamalia township, is the site of Malli, a city captured by Alexander the Great in 325 BCE. Alexander stayed in this region of Punjab for two years in a time of frequent military conflict.

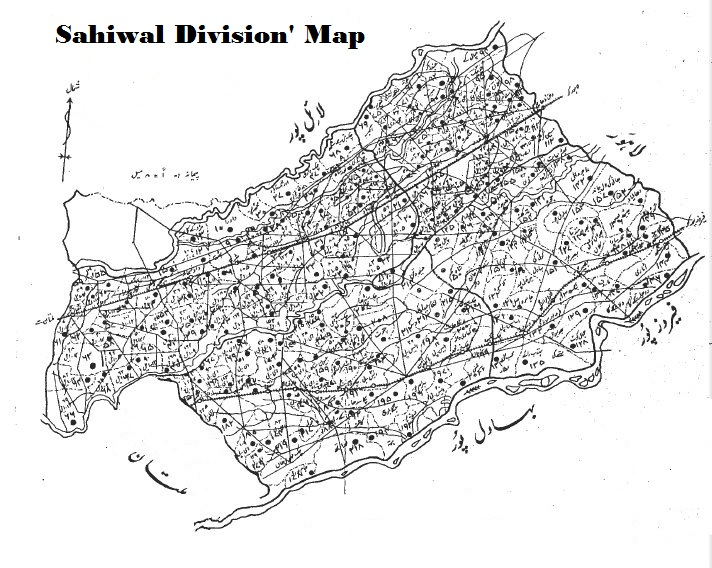
Boundaries of Sahiwal Division

== List of the Districts ==
#	District	Headquarter	Area (km²)	Pop. (2023)	Density (ppl/km²) (2023)	Lit. rate (2023)
1	Okara	Okara	4,377	3,515,490	802.2	60.25%
2	Pakpattan	Pakpattan	2,724	2,136,170	785.3	57.13%
3	Sahiwal	Sahiwal	3,201	2,881,811	900.6	64.77%

== List of the Tehsils ==
#	Tehsil	Area (km²)	Pop. (2023)	Density (ppl/km²) (2023)	Lit. rate (2023)	Districts
1	Depalpur	2,502	1,592,201	636.37	55.29%	Okara District
2	Okara	1,241	1,393,746	1,123.08	63.34%	Okara District
3	Renala Khurd	634	529,543	835.24	66.98%	Okara District
4	Arifwala	1,241	999,278	805.22	58.24%	Pakpattan District
5	Pakpattan	1,483	1,136,892	766.62	56.11%	Pakpattan District
6	Chichawatni	1,591	1,155,978	726.57	65.25%	Sahiwal District
7	Sahiwal	1,610	1,725,833	1,071.95	64.44%	Sahiwal District

== Climate ==
In the Köppen climate classification, Sahiwal has a Semi-arid climate. More precisely, it is intermediate between a Desert climate (BW) and a Humid subtropical climate.

Temperatures in Sahiwal vary between hot and very hot in summer and are mild in winters. In May, June and July, temperatures increase to maximums between 40 and 50 °C. In winter months, the temperature falls to minimums between 5 and 10 °C.

Sahiwal lies on the edge of the Thar Desert at a low altitude and so, wet seasons are warm and dry seasons are cool. Sahiwal is also affected by the monsoon. Precipitation is very heavy in the monsoon, and dry during the rest of the year, with few or no months bringing moderate levels of precipitation.

The annual average rainfall in Sahiwal is approximately 349 mm.

The soil in Sahiwal is fertile. The vegetation is short and scrubby. The land supports grasses, shrubs and some forests.

== Economy ==
The economy of Sahiwal Division depends on agriculture and associated industries. The largest crop is wheat, followed by cotton.

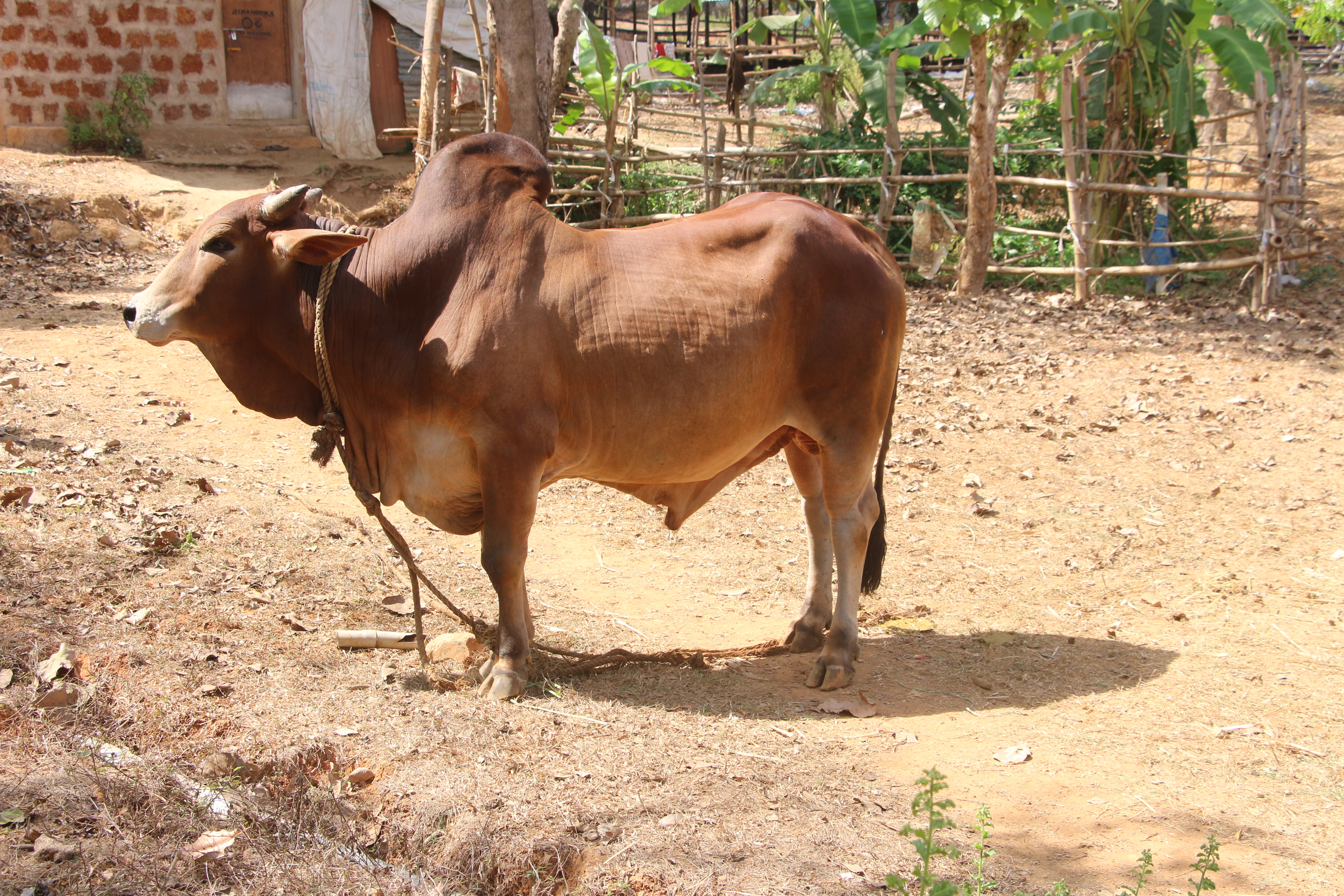
Sahiwala bull

The Sahiwal cattle breed, a dairy breed of Zebu or "humped cattle" is grown in the region. This cattle breed is tick resistant, heat tolerant and resistant to external and internal parasites Due to their heat tolerance and high milk production, Sahiwal cattle are grown in other Asian countries, African nations such as Kenya, Burundi, Somalia, Sierra Leone and Nigeria and Caribbean nations such as Jamaica, and Guyana.

Other livestock types that are grown in Sahiwal include sheep, and goat. Fish and poultry are also in abundant.

The Nili-Ravi is a breed of domestic water buffalo native to the Sahiwal area.

== Education ==
The average urban literacy rate of Sahiwal Division (Sahiwal, Okara, and Pakpattan) is 60.7 percent. The average rural literacy rate is 33.8 percent.

== Demographics ==
Historical population
Year	Pop.	±% p.a.
1951	...	—
1961	...	—
1972	...	—
1981	...	—
1998	5,362,866	—
2017	7,380,386	+1.69%
2023	8,533,471	+2.45%

According to 2023 census, Sahiwal division had a population of 8,533,471 roughly equal to the nation of Honduras or the US state of Virginia.

According to 2017 census, Sahiwal division had a population of 7,378,065, which includes 3,769,226 males and 3,608,089 females.

According to 1998 Census in Pakistan, the population of Sahiwal Division was 6,271,247. The population density was 608 people per square kilometre, 47% were female, 75% lived in an urban environment. The urban literacy rate was 60.7 percent. The rural literacy rate was 33.8 percent.

== Constituencies ==
Provincial Assembly Constituency	National Assembly Constituency	District
PP-185 Okara-I	NA-135 Okara-I	Okara
PP-192 Okara-VIII	NA-135 Okara-I	Okara
PP-190 Okara-VI	NA-136 Okara-II	Okara
PP-191 Okara-VII	NA-136 Okara-II	Okara
PP-186 Okara-II	NA-137 Okara-III	Okara
PP-189 Okara-V	NA-137 Okara-III	Okara
PP-187 Okara-III	NA-138 Okara-IV	Okara
PP-188 Okara-IV	NA-138 Okara-IV	Okara
PP-193 Pakpattan-I	NA-139 Pakpattan-I	Pakpattan
PP-194 Pakpattan-II	NA-139 Pakpattan-I	Pakpattan
PP-197 Pakpattan-V	NA-139 Pakpattan-I	Pakpattan
PP-195 Pakpattan-III	NA-140 Pakpattan-II	Pakpattan
PP-196 Pakpattan-IV	NA-140 Pakpattan-II	Pakpattan
PP-198 Sahiwal-I	NA-141 Sahiwal-I	Sahiwal
PP-199 Sahiwal-II	NA-141 Sahiwal-I	Sahiwal
PP-200 Sahiwal-III	NA-142 Sahiwal-II	Sahiwal
PP-201 Sahiwal-IV	NA-142 Sahiwal-II	Sahiwal
PP-202 Sahiwal-V	NA-142 Sahiwal-II	Sahiwal
PP-203 Sahiwal-VI	NA-143 Sahiwal-III	Sahiwal
PP-204 Sahiwal-VII	NA-143 Sahiwal-III	Sahiwal

== Notable people ==
- Fariduddin Ganjshakar (1179 CE - 1266 CE) known as "Baba Farid" (Punjabi: بابا فرید (Shahmukhi), was a 12th-century Sufi preacher and saint of the Chishti Order of South Asia. Ganjshakar is one of the first major poets of the Punjabi language, and is one of the pivotal saints of the Punjab region.
- Tufail Mohammad (1914 CE - 1958 CE) was a recipient of the Nishan-e-Haider, Pakistan's highest military award, for his contribution to the defence of Pakistan.
- Majeed Amjad (1914 CE - 1974 CE) was a writer of modern Urdu literature. He was educated at the Government College Lahore. He was inspired by the flora of Sahiwal. There is a park named for him.
- Abdus Salam (1926 CE - 1996 CE) was a theoretical physicist who won the 1979 Nobel Prize in Physics for his contribution to electroweak theory. He was born in Santokdas a village near haveli lakha tehsil depalpur where his maternal grand father was resided, raised in Jhang and is buried in Rabwah.

== See also ==
- Divisions of Pakistan
  - Divisions of Punjab, Pakistan
- Harappa
- Okara District
- Pakpattan District
- Kaluwal Mittha Village
