= Chak 69 EB =

اگرو Ugroo
- Village
- Chak 69 EB
- Location in Pakistan
- Coordinates: 30.15°N 73.254°E
- Country: Pakistan
- Region: Punjab
- District: Pakpattan

Population (2023)
  - Total: 9,000
- Time zone: UTC+5 (PST)
- Website: saqib07.com

Chak 69 EB (Urdu: اگرو) is a village in the tehsil of Arifwala, Pakpattan District in the Sahiwal Division in the Punjab province of Pakistan. The village covers 1600 acres.

== History ==
Ugru is a village within Arifwala city. It is situated near the Grand Mosque.

== Geography ==
Ugru is roughly 90 kilometres (56 mi) from the border with India, and 184 kilometres (114 mi) by road southwest of Lahore.

== Language ==
Punjabi is the native language, while Urdu is widely understood.

== Education ==
- Punjab Group of colleges
- Govt. Boys High School
- Govt. Girls High School
- Alfazal Public School

== Economy ==
Agriculture is important to the local economy, particularly cotton, grain, potato, wheat and rice, which are exported within Pakistan and abroad. Industries also operate there. Some residents work abroad and some are teachers.

== Points of concern ==
"The lack of unity among the people of Ugroo has exacerbated the sewage issues,hindering progress. To address this ,Villagers need to come together and work collectively, which is a significant challenge. It's essential for stakeholders,particularly those with influential development and welfare over personal interests."

== Castes ==
The primary castes are:

- Arain (Chaudhary)
- Awan (ALvi)
- Jutt
- Mughal
- Kharil
- Mohal
- Rajpoot
- Gujjar

== Sports ==
Football, cricket, and kabaddi are the most popular local sports.
