= Qaboola =

City in Punjab, Pakistan

Qaboola قبُولہ
- City
- Location in Pakistan Qaboola (Pakistan)
- Coordinates: 30°8′53″N 73°4′22″E
- Country: Pakistan
- Province: Punjab
- District: Pakpattan
- Tehsil: Arifwala
- Union councils: 3

Government
  - Type: Municipality

Population (2023)
  - Total: 52,769
- Time zone: UTC+5 (PKT)
  - Summer (DST): UTC+6 (PDT)
- Postal code: 57480

Qaboola (Punjabi: قبُولہ, Urdu: قبُولہ) is a historical city in Pakpattan District of the Punjab province of Pakistan. It is located near Sutlej River.

== Location ==
Qaboola's geographical coordinates are 30°8'53" North, 73°4'22" East. It is situated 16 km north of the Sutlej River and 20 km south of Arifwala.

== History ==
Qaboola is an ancient and historic city and known for its deep connection to Punjabi folklore and history. It is associated with the Punjabi folklore Heer Ranjha, where it is mentioned as the place where the lovers took refuge. It also houses the shrine of Hazrat Shah Musa Abul Mukarim, a Qadri Sufi saint and son of Hazrat Shah Kamal Kaithali.

== See also ==
- Malka Hans
