= PP-193 Pakpattan-I =

Constituency of the Punjabi Provincial Legislature, Pakistan

- Constituency for the Provincial Assembly of Punjab
- Region: Pakpattan Tehsil (partly) of Pakpattan District

Current constituency
- Member: Ahmad Shah Khagga
- Created from: PP-227 Pakpattan-I (2002-2018); PP-191 Pakpattan-I (2018-2023)

PP-193 Pakpattan-I (پی پی-193، پاکپتن-1) is a Constituency of Provincial Assembly of Punjab. In 2018 general election it was PP-191, and it was PP-227 in 2013, 2008, 2002 general elections.

== General elections 2024 ==
Provincial election 2024: PP-193 Pakpattan-I
Party	Candidate	Votes	%	±%
PML(N)	Farooq Ahmad Khan Maneka	40,172	33.59	
Independent	Mian Muhammad Hayat Maneka	38,218	31.95	
Independent	Mian Muhammad Farrukh Mumtaz Maneka	23,322	19.50	
TLP	Muhammad Ahmad	9,679	8.09	
Independent	Rao Usman Hashim Khan	2,161	1.81	
Others	Others (sixteen candidates)	6,060	5.06	
Turnout		120,668	52.70	
Total valid votes		119,612	99.12	
Rejected ballots		1,056	0.88	
Majority		1,954	1.64	
Registered electors		228,979		
hold				

== General elections 2018 ==
Provincial election 2018: PP-191 Pakpattan-I
Party	Candidate	Votes	%	±%
PTI	Mian Muhammad Farrukh Mumtaz Maneka	29,388	27.75	
Independent	Farooq Ahmad Khan Maneka	29,277	27.65	
PML(N)	Mian Muhammad Hayat Maneka	27,155	25.64	
TLP	Sher Ahmed	7,297	6.89	
Independent	Rao Jameel Hashim Khan	5,377	5.08	
PHP	Qurban Ali	2,401	2.27	
PPP	Muhammad Tayyab	1,958	1.85	
Others	Others (seven candidates)	3,042	2.88	
Turnout		110,552	57.45	
Total valid votes		105,895	95.79	
Rejected ballots		4,657	4.21	
Majority		111	0.10	
Registered electors		192,448		

== General elections 2013 ==
Provincial election 2013: PP-227 Pakpattan-I
Party	Candidate	Votes	%	±%
PML(N)	Mian Atta Muhammad Manika	48,153	49.33	
Independent	Farooq Ahmad Khan Maneka	42,111	43.14	
Independent	Muhammad Ashraf Kamboh	4,187	4.29	
Others	Others (nine candidates)	3,169	3.25	
Turnout		101,111	65.25	
Total valid votes		97,620	96.55	
Rejected ballots		3,491	3.45	
Majority		6,042	6.19	
Registered electors		154,963		

== General elections 2008 ==
Contesting candidates	Party affiliation	Votes polled
Mian Atta Muhammad Manika	PML(N)	

== See also ==
- PP-192 Okara-VIII
- PP-194 Pakpattan-II
