= Syed Raza Ali Gillani =

Pakistani politician

- سید رضا علی گلانی
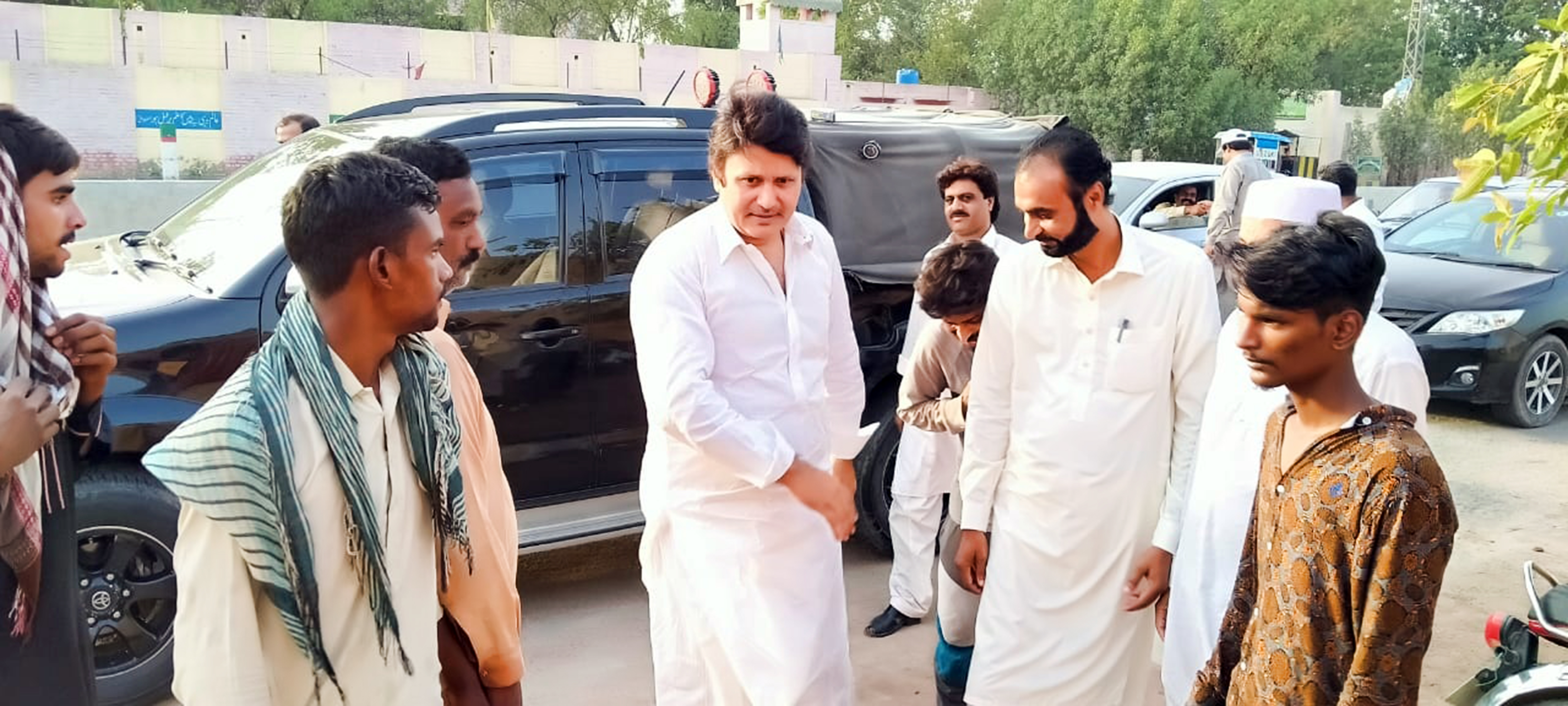

Member of the National Assembly of Pakistan
- Incumbent
- Assumed office 29 February 2024
- Constituency: NA-137 Okara-III

Member of the Provincial Assembly of the Punjab
- In office 2002 – 31 May 2018
- Constituency: PP-187 Okara-III

Personal details
- Born: 30 April 1975 (age 51) Okara, Punjab, Pakistan
- Party: PTI (2018-present)
- Other political affiliations: PMLN (2013–2018); PML(Q) (2002–2013)

Syed Raza Ali Gillani is a Pakistani politician who has been a member of the National Assembly of Pakistan since February 2024. He was a member of the Provincial Assembly of the Punjab, from 2002 to May 2018.

== Early life and education ==
He was born on 30 April 1975 in Lahore. He belongs to the Gaddi Nashin family of Hujra Shah Muqim, who are related to the famous Gilani family of Punjab.

He received his early education from Aitchison College. He graduated in 1995 from Government College, Lahore and received a degree of Master of Science in Textile Marketing from Philadelphia University in 1999.

== Political career ==
He ran for the seat of the Provincial Assembly of the Punjab as a candidate of Pakistan Muslim League (Q) (PML-Q) from Constituency PP-187 (Okara-III). He received 35,797 votes and defeated a candidate of Pakistan Muslim League (Jinnah).

In January 2003, he was inducted into the provincial Punjab cabinet of Chief Minister Chaudhry Pervaiz Elahi and was appointed Minister of Punjab for Housing and Urban Development. During his tenure as member of the Provincial Assembly of the Punjab, he also served as Provincial Minister of Punjab for Public Health Engineering.

He was re-elected to the Provincial Assembly of the Punjab as a candidate of PML-Q from Constituency PP-187 (Okara-III) in the 2008 Punjab provincial election. He received 30,233 votes and defeated Manzoor Wattoo.

He was re-elected to the Provincial Assembly of the Punjab as a candidate of Pakistan Muslim League (N) (PML(N)) from Constituency PP-187 (Okara-III) in the 2013 Punjab provincial election. In November 2016, he was inducted into the provincial Punjab cabinet of Chief Minister Shehbaz Sharif and was made Provincial Minister of Punjab for Higher Education.

He contested the 2018 Punjab provincial election as an independent candidate from PP-184 Okara-II, but was unsuccessful. He received 41,068 votes and was defeated by Jugnu Mohsin, another independent candidate. He also contested from PP-185 Okara-III as an independent candidate, but was unsuccessful. He received 13,737 votes and was defeated by Chaudry Iftikhar Hussain Chachar, a candidate of PML(N).

He was elected to the National Assembly of Pakistan in the 2024 Pakistani general election as an independent candidate supported by Pakistan Tehreek-e-Insaf (PTI) from NA-137 Okara. He received 132,067 votes and defeated Rao Muhammad Ajmal Khan, a candidate of PML(N).
