= Pakpattan (disambiguation) =

Pakpattan is a city in Punjab, Pakistan.

Pakpattan may also refer to:

- Pakpattan District, a district of Punjab (Pakistan)
- Pakpattan Tehsil, a tehsil of district Pakpattan

== See also ==
- Pakpattan railway station, a railway station in Pakistan
- Pakpattan Canal, canal in Pakistan
- Pakpatan Hydropower Plant, a small hydropower plant in Pakistan
