= Qasim Nadeem =

Punjab Politician

Malik Qasim Nadeem
- ملک قاسم ندیم

Member of the Provincial Assembly of the Punjab
- Incumbent
- Assumed office 24 February 2024
- Constituency: PP-199 Sahiwal-II

Personal details
- Party: PMLN (2024-present)
- Parent: Malik Nadeem Kamran

Malik Qasim Nadeem (Urdu: ملک قاسم ندیم) is a Pakistani politician who serves as a Member of the Provincial Assembly of Punjab (PAOP).

== Early life ==
He was born to Malik Nadeem Kamran.

== Politics ==
He participated in the 2024 Punjab provincial election as a candidate of the Pakistan Muslim League (N) from PP-199 Sahiwal-II and won by securing votes 46255 votes. He took oath as member of the Provincial Assembly of the Punjab on 24 February 2024.
