= PP-196 Pakpattan-IV =

Constituency of the Punjabi Provincial Legislature, Pakistan

- Constituency for the Provincial Assembly of Punjab
- Region: Arif Wala Tehsil (partly) of Pakpattan District

Current constituency
- Created from: PP-230 Pakpattan-IV (2002-2018); PP-194 Pakpattan-IV (2018-2023)

PP-196 Pakpattan-IV (پی پی-196، پاکپتن-4) is a Constituency of Provincial Assembly of Punjab.

== General elections 2024 ==
Provincial election 2024: PP-196 Pakpattan-IV
Party	Candidate	Votes	%	±%
PML(N)	Farrukh Javed	55,513	40.82	
Independent	Muhammad Naeem (Note: Filed nomination papers as PTI candidate but ECP allowed him to run as an Independent)	54,682	40.21	
TLP	Abdul Rasool Rizvi	8,681	6.38	
Independent	Waseem Zafar	5,806	4.27	
Independent	Majid Hussain	3,050	2.24	
PPP	Syed Fakhar UI Islam Shah	2,851	2.10	
Others	Others (fifteen candidates)	5,418	3.98	
Turnout		139,613	55.36	
Total valid votes		136,001	97.41	
Rejected ballots		3,612	2.59	
Majority		831	0.61	
Registered electors		252,184		
hold				

== General elections 2018 ==
Provincial election 2018: PP-194 Pakpattan-IV
Party	Candidate	Votes	%	±%
PTI	Muhammad Naeem	61,526	47.61	
PML(N)	Farrukh Javed	54,374	42.04	
PPP	Syed Fakhar UI Islam Shah	4,976	3.85	
Independent	Chaudhary Muhammad Shahzad	4,089	3.16	
Independent	Muhammad Amir	1,638	1.27	
AAT	Ahmad Zeeshan	1,296	1.00	
Others	Others (five candidates)	1,387	1.07	
Turnout		132,644	60.71	
Total valid votes		129,333	97.50	
Rejected ballots		3,311	2.50	
Majority		7,199	5.57	
Registered electors		218,489		

== General elections 2013 ==
Provincial election 2013: PP-230 Pakpattan-IV
Party	Candidate	Votes	%	±%
PML(N)	Dr. Farrukh Javed	66,906	53.89	
PTI	Muhammad Naeem Ibraheem	50,734	40.86	
MDM	Malik Fakhar Qutab	2,855	2.30	
PPP	Shaukat Ali Bajwa	2,435	1.96	
Others	Others (three candidates)	1,228	0.99	
Turnout		128,465	67.26	
Total valid votes		124,158	96.65	
Rejected ballots		4,307	3.35	
Majority		16,172	13.03	
Registered electors		190,984		

== General elections 2008 ==
Contesting candidates	Party affiliation	Votes polled

== See also ==
- PP-195 Pakpattan-III
- PP-197 Pakpattan-V
