= Constituency NA-146 =

Constituency NA-146 may refer to:

- NA-146 (Khanewal-III), a constituency (after 2023 delimitation) that covers Mian Channu Tehsil.
- NA-146 (Pakpattan-II), a constituency (after 2018 delimitation) that covers Arif Wala Tehsil.
- NA-146 (Okara-IV), a former constituency based on 2002 delimitation
