= PP-194 Pakpattan-II =

Constituency of the Punjabi Provincial Legislature, Pakistan

- Constituency for the Provincial Assembly of Punjab
- Region: Pakpattan Tehsil (partly) including Pakpattan city of Pakpattan District

Current constituency
- Replaced by: PP-228 Pakpattan-II (2002-2018); PP-192 Pakpattan-II (2018-2023)

PP-194 Pakpattan-II (پی پی-194، پاکپتن-2) is a Constituency of Provincial Assembly of Punjab.

== General elections 2024 ==
Provincial election 2024: PP-194 Pakpattan-II
Party	Candidate	Votes	%	±%
PML(N)	Chaudhry Javed Ahmad	38,624	31.67	
Independent	Naveed Ali	29,822	24.45	
Independent	Diwan Mehr Moin Ud Din Chishti (Note: Filed nomination papers as PTI candidate but ECP allowed him to run as an Independent)	29,277	24.00	
TLP	Azmat Said Muhammad Chishti	16,089	13.19	
PPP	Saif Ahmad	2,911	2.39	
Others	Others (fourteen candidates)	5,253	4.30	
Turnout		125,857	53.37	
Total valid votes		121,976	96.92	
Rejected ballots		3,881	3.08	
Majority		8,802	7.22	
Registered electors		235,802		
hold				

== General elections 2018 ==
Provincial election 2018: PP-192 Pakpattan-II
Party	Candidate	Votes	%	±%
Independent	Mian Naveed Ali	47,016	42.64	
PTI	Dewan Azmat Said Muhammad Chishti	39,526	32.22	
PML(N)	Sajjad Ali	11,757	11.66	
TLP	Muhammad Akram Nawaz	7,492	7.70	
PHP	Zulifqar Ali Khan	3,297	2.99	
Pakistan People's Party Parliamentarians	Fazal Karim Soni Khan	2,714	1.55	
Independent	Azhar Mehmood	1,274	1.16	
Others	Others (three candidates)	1,191	1.08	
Turnout		113,316	57.41	
Total valid votes		110,267	97.31	
Rejected ballots		3,049	2.69	
Majority		11,490	10.42	
Registered electors		197,380		

== General elections 2013 ==
Provincial election 2013: PP-228 Pakpattan-II
Party	Candidate	Votes	%	±%
PML(N)	Mian Naveed Ali	37,134	39.02	
Independent	Mian Jalal Akbar Hotiana	13,551	14.24	
PTI	Mazhar Fareed Watto	11,621	12.21	
Independent	Ganj Bakhsh Bodla	8,173	8.59	
PPP	Mian Hamayoun Sarwar Bodla	6,539	6.87	
Independent	Pir Fiaz Ahmad Chishti	4,235	4.45	
Independent	Dewan Azmat Said Muhammad Chishti	3,037	3.19	
Independent	Malik Aurang Zaib Khokhar	2,653	2.79	
Independent	Atill Mehmood Khan	1,476	1.55	
Independent	Sajida Yousaf	1,316	1.38	
Independent	Nazam Hussain Chishti	1,231	1.29	
Others	Others (fourteen candidates)	4,208	4.42	
Turnout		99,424	61.65	
Total valid votes		95,174	95.73	
Rejected ballots		4,250	4.27	
Majority		23,583	24.78	
Registered electors		161,262		

== General elections 2008 ==
Contesting candidates	Party affiliation	Votes polled

== See also ==
- PP-193 Pakpattan-I
- PP-195 Pakpattan-III
