= Rao Muhammad Ajmal Khan =

Pakistani politician

- راو محمد اجمل خان

Member of the National Assembly of Pakistan
- In office 13 August 2018 – 10 August 2023
- Constituency: NA-143 (Okara-III)
- In office 1 June 2013 – 31 May 2018
- Constituency: NA-146 (Okara-IV)

Personal details
- Born: 20 August 1954 (age 72) Okara, Punjab, Pakistan
- Party: PMLN

Rao Muhammad Ajmal Khan (Urdu: راو محمد اجمل خان; born 20 August 1954) is a Pakistani politician who had been a member of the National Assembly of Pakistan from August 2018 till August 2023. Previously he was a member of the National Assembly from 2002 to 2007 and again from June 2013 to May 2018.

He currently serves as Special Assistant to the Prime Minister, with the status of Minister of State

== Early life ==
He was born on 20 August 1954. he is son of Rao Afzal, Who was MNA in 1977 & 88.

== Political career ==
He was elected to the National Assembly of Pakistan as an independent candidate from Constituency NA-146 (Okara-IV) in the 2002 Pakistani general election. He received 62,711 votes and defeated Rao Muhammad Safdar Khan, a candidate of Pakistan Muslim League (Q) (PML-Q). In August 2003, he was appointed as Federal Parliamentary Secretary for petroleum and natural resources. in Jamali Government.

He ran for the seat of the National Assembly as a candidate of PML-Q from Constituency NA-146 (Okara-IV) in the 2008 Pakistani general election but was unsuccessful. He received 46,006 votes and lost the seat to Manzoor Wattoo. In the same election, he ran for the seat of the Provincial Assembly of the Punjab as an independent candidate from Constituency PP-192 (Okara-VIII) but was unsuccessful. He received 65 votes and lost the seat to Malik Ali Abbas Khokhar.

He was re-elected to the National Assembly as a candidate of Pakistan Muslim League (N) (PML-N) from Constituency NA-146 (Okara-IV) in the 2013 Pakistani general election. He received 109,998 votes and defeated Manzoor Wattoo. During his tenure as Member of the National Assembly, he served as Federal Parliamentary Secretary for Industries and Production.

He was re-elected to the National Assembly as a candidate of PML-N from Constituency NA-143 (Okara-III) in the 2018 Pakistani general election.

He ran for the seat of the National Assembly as a candidate of PML-N from Constituency NA-137 (Okara-III) in the 2024 Pakistani general election but was unsuccessful. He lost the seat to Syed Raza Ali Gillani a PTI supported independent candidate.
