= PP-195 Pakpattan-III =

Constituency of the Punjabi Provincial Legislature, Pakistan

- Constituency for the Provincial Assembly of Punjab
- Region: Arif Wala Tehsil (partly) including Arifwala city of Pakpattan District

Current constituency
- Created from: PP-231 Pakpattan-V (2002-2018); PP-195 Pakpattan-V (2018-2023)

PP-195 Pakpattan-III (پی پی-195، پاکپتن-3) is a Constituency of Provincial Assembly of Punjab.

== General elections 2024 ==
Provincial election 2024: PP-195 Pakpattan-III
Party	Candidate	Votes	%	±%
Independent	Imran Akram	51,179	38.72	
PML(N)	Kashif Ali Chishty	37,474	28.35	
Independent	Salman Safdar (Note: Filed nomination papers as PTI candidate but ECP allowed him to run as an Independent)	22,571	17.08	
TLP	Ali Ahmad	10,396	7.86	
PPP	Syed Imran Mohsin	5,155	3.90	
Independent	Farah Tahir	2,043	1.55	
Others	Others (seven candidates)	3,371	2.54	
Turnout		136,709	56.51	
Total valid votes		132,189	96.61	
Rejected ballots		4,520	3.31	
Majority		13,705	10.37	
Registered electors		241,912		
hold				

== General elections 2018 ==
Provincial election 2018: PP-195 Pakpattan-V
Party	Candidate	Votes	%	±%
PML(N)	Kashif Ali Chishti	48,670	40.78	
PTI	Khan Amir Hamza Rath	38,221	32.02	
Pakistan Kissan Ittehad (Ch.Anwar)	Rana Muhammad Ahsan Khan	9,670	8.10	
Independent	Ali Ahmad	8,618	7.22	
PHP	Zulifqar Ali Khan	4,854	4.07	
PPP	Nazar Fareed Khan	4,074	3.41	
TLP	Muhammad Farooq	3,278	2.75	
Independent	Atta Muhammad	1,565	1.31	
Others	Others (two candidates)	404	0.34	
Turnout		123,297	59.52	
Total valid votes		119,354	96.80	
Rejected ballots		3,943	3.20	
Majority		10,449	8.76	
Registered electors		207,159		

== General elections 2013 ==
Provincial election 2013: PP-231 Pakpattan-V
Party	Candidate	Votes	%	±%
PML(N)	Pir Kashif Ali Chishty	39,388	40.06	
PTI	Khan Ameer Hamza Rath	22,537	22.92	
Independent	Nazar Fareed Khan Lakhoka	10,464	10.64	
PPP	Rana Shahzad Hamid	6,830	6.95	
PML(Q)	Ghulam Qadir Rana Urf Munay Khan	5,204	5.29	
JI	Rana Muhammad Ahsan Khan Al Maroof Mangay Khan	4,948	5.03	
Independent	Lal Khan Urf Imran Khan	2,733	2.78	
Independent	Haji Muhammad Aslam Chohaan	2,181	2.22	
PPP(SB)	Syed Naeem Ul Hassan Gilani	1,111	1.13	
Others	Others (eight candidates)	2,925	2.97	
Turnout		102,556	65.78	
Total valid votes		98,321	95.87	
Rejected ballots		4,235	4.13	
Majority		16,851	17.14	
Registered electors		155,915		

== General elections 2008 ==
Contesting candidates	Party affiliation	Votes polled

== See also ==
- PP-194 Pakpattan-II
- PP-196 Pakpattan-IV
