= PP-197 Pakpattan-V =

Constituency of the Punjabi Provincial Legislature, Pakistan

- Constituency for the Provincial Assembly of Punjab
- Region: Pakpattan Tehsil (partly) including Malka Hans town of Pakpattan District

Current constituency
- Created from: PP-229 Pakpattan-III (2002-2018); PP-193 Pakpattan-III (2018-2023)

PP-197 Pakpattan-V (پی پی-197، پاکپتن-5) is a Constituency of Provincial Assembly of Punjab.

== General elections 2024 ==
Provincial election 2024: PP-197 Pakpattan-V
Party	Candidate	Votes	%	±%
PML(N)	Sardar Mansab Ali Dogar	48,955	37.77	
Independent	Tariq Qayyum Shah (Note: Filed nomination papers as PTI candidate but ECP allowed him to run as an Independent)	46,760	36.07	
TLP	Ghulam Mohyu Din	10,769	8.31	
Independent	Rana Muhammad Ihsan	7,396	5.71	
JI	Khuram Iqbal	3,703	2.86	
PPP	Rao Jamil Hashim Khan	3,130	2.42	
Independent	Hassan Rasheed Khan	2,829	2.18	
Independent	Muhammad Shah Khagga	2,594	2.00	
Others	Others (eleven candidates)	3,486	2.68	
Turnout		131,061	53.44	
Total valid votes		129,622	98.90	
Rejected ballots		1,439	1.10	
Majority		2,195	1.70	
Registered electors		245,259		
hold				

== General elections 2018 ==
Provincial election 2018: PP-193 Pakpattan-III
Party	Candidate	Votes	%	±%
PTI	Ahmad Shah Khaga	45,147	39.86	
Independent	Sardar Mansib Ali Dogar	31,914	28.18	
PML(N)	Waqar Ahmad Khan	13,427	11.86	
Independent	Chaudhary Zia Ullah Waraich	9,486	8.38	
TLP	Syed Khurram Abbass	6,186	5.46	
PPP	Muhammad Shafiq	3,590	3.17	
NP	Rao Muhammad Aslam	1,239	1.09	
Others	Others (four candidates)	2,264	2.00	
Turnout		117,274	58.06	
Total valid votes		113,253	96.57	
Rejected ballots		4,021	3.43	
Majority		13,233	11.68	
Registered electors		201,983		

== General elections 2013 ==
Provincial election 2013: PP-229 Pakpattan-III
Party	Candidate	Votes	%	±%
PML(Q)	Ahmad Shah Khagga	44,937	44.61	
PML(N)	Sardar Wajid Ali Dogar	37,721	37.44	
PTI	Mian Mazhar Hussain	8,459	8.40	
PPP	Imram Akram Beiu	3,244	3.22	
JI	Muhammad Tufail	3,067	3.04	
JUI (F)	Muhammad Tahir	1,523	1.51	
Others	Others (eight candidates)	1,789	1.78	
Turnout		104,445	65.12	
Total valid votes		100,740	96.45	
Rejected ballots		3,705	3.55	
Majority		7,216	7.17	
Registered electors		160,397		

== General elections 2008 ==
Contesting candidates	Party affiliation	Votes polled

== See also ==
- PP-196 Pakpattan-IV
- PP-198 Sahiwal-I
