= Malik Nadeem Kamran =

Pakistani politician (1953–2026)

- ملک ندیم کامران

Member of the Provincial Assembly of the Punjab
- In office 15 August 2018 – 14 January 2023
- Constituency: PP-197 Sahiwal-II
- In office 10 June 2013 – 31 May 2018
- Constituency: PP-197 Sahiwal-II
- In office 20 March 2008 – 10 March 2013
- Constituency: PP-197 Sahiwal-II

Personal details
- Born: 3 August 1953 Sahiwal, West Punjab, Pakistan
- Died: 15 May 2026 (aged 72)
- Other political affiliations: Pakistan Muslim League (N)

Punjab Assembly Lahore

Malik Nadeem Kamran (3 August 1953 – 15 May 2026) was a Pakistani politician who was a Member of the Provincial Assembly of the Punjab, from 1997 to 1999, 2008 to May 2018, and August 2018 to January 2023. He totally contested 5 Elections and won all, But one lose in Recounting.

== Early life and education ==
Kamran was born in Sahiwal on 3 August 1953, into a Kakazai Malik family.

He graduated in 1974 from Bahauddin Zakariya University and had the degree of Bachelor of Arts.

== Political career ==
Kamran was elected to the Provincial Assembly of the Punjab as a candidate of Pakistan Muslim League (N) (PML-N) from Constituency PP-181 (Sahiwal-II) in the 1997 Pakistani general election. He received 25,058 votes and defeated Rana Aftab Ahmed Khan, a candidate of Pakistan Peoples Party (PPP).

He ran for the seat of the Provincial Assembly of the Punjab as a candidate of PML-N from Constituency PP-221 (Sahiwal-II) in the 2002 Pakistani general election but was unsuccessful. He received 11,163 votes and lost the seat to Rana Aftab a candidate of PPP. In this Election his Panal as PML-N with the New Candidates, Syed Imran Ahmed Shah and Haji Muhammad Mansha Sipra. PML-N Source Claimed that Panal first Successful, But lose in Recounting. Otherwise he won all elections in his Long Career.

Kamran was re-elected to the Provincial Assembly of the Punjab as a candidate of PML-N from Constituency PP-221 (Sahiwal-II) in the 2008 Pakistani general election. He received 36,376 votes and defeated Muhammad Zaki Chaudhry, a candidate of PPP. During his second tenure as Member of the Punjab Assembly, he served in the provincial cabinet of Chief Minister Shahbaz Sharif as Provincial Minister of Punjab for Food from June 2008 to June 2010 and as Provincial Minister of Punjab for Zakat and Ushr.

He was elected to the Provincial Assembly of the Punjab as a candidate of PML-N from Constituency PP-221 (Sahiwal-II) in the 2013 Pakistani general election. He received 55,462 votes and defeated Sheikh Muhammad Chohan, a candidate of Pakistan Tehreek-e-Insaf (PTI). In June 2013, he was inducted into the provincial cabinet of Chief Minister Shahbaz Sharif and was made Provincial Minister of Punjab for Zakat and Ushr. In June 2013, he was inducted into the provincial Punjab cabinet of Chief Minister Shehbaz Sharif and was made Provincial Minister of Punjab for Zakat and Ushr. In a cabinet reshuffle in November 2016, he was made Provincial Minister of Punjab for Planning and Development.

Kamran was re-elected to Provincial Assembly of the Punjab as a candidate of PML-N from Constituency PP-197 (Sahiwal-II) in the 2018 Pakistani general election.

== Death ==
In 2026, Kamran was hospitalised due to a prolonged illness. He died on 15 May 2026, at the age of 72..
