= PP-198 Sahiwal-I =

Constituency of the Punjabi Provincial Legislature, Pakistan

- Constituency for the Provincial Assembly of Punjab
- Region: Sahiwal Tehsil (partly) of Sahiwal District

Current constituency
- Created from: PP-220 Sahiwal-I (2002-2018); PP-196 Sahiwal-I (2018-2023)

PP-198 Sahiwal-I (پی پی-198، ساہيوال-1) is a Constituency of Provincial Assembly of Punjab.

== General elections 2024 ==
Provincial election 2024: PP-198 Sahiwal-I
| Party | Candidate | Votes | % | ±% |
|---|---|---|---|---|
| PML(N) | Walayat Shah | 46,137 | 33.71 | |
| Independent | Sajjad Nasir (Note: Filed nomination papers as PTI candidate but ECP allowed him to run as an Independent) | 39,224 | 28.66 | |
| Independent | Muhammad Saghir Anjum | 26,198 | 19.14 | |
| PPP | Peer Zafar Shah Khagga | 12,238 | 8.94 | |
| TLP | Muhammad Ghalib Mughal | 8,294 | 6.06 | |
| Others | Others (twelve candidates) | 4,786 | 3.49 | |
| Turnout | | 141,289 | 54.06 | |
| Total valid votes | | 136,877 | 96.88 | |
| Rejected ballots | | 4,412 | 3.12 | |
| Majority | | 6,913 | 5.05 | |
| Registered electors | | 261,335 | | |
| hold | | | | |

== General elections 2018 ==
Provincial election 2018: PP-196 Sahiwal-I
| Party | Candidate | Votes | % | ±% |
|---|---|---|---|---|
| PML(N) | Khizer Hayat | 50,412 | 44.12 | |
| PTI | Muhammad Muzaffar Shah Khagga | 30,680 | 26.85 | |
| Independent | Sajjad Nasir | 17,127 | 14.99 | |
| PPP | Peer Zafar Shah Khagga | 9,739 | 8.52 | |
| TLP | Muhammad Tahir | 3,687 | 3.23 | |
| MMA | Izhar Ahmad | 1,367 | 1.20 | |
| Others | Others (three candidates) | 1,261 | 1.10 | |
| Turnout | | 117,741 | 56.53 | |
| Total valid votes | | 114,273 | 97.06 | |
| Rejected ballots | | 3,468 | 2.94 | |
| Majority | | 19,732 | 17.27 | |
| Registered electors | | 208,274 | | |

== General elections 2013 ==
Even in 2013, Khazir Hayat successful and his competition was with the Nijat group led by Haji Muhammad Mansha Sipra, Group Candidate was Manzoor, who is runner up in 2013 Election.

Provincial election 2013: PP-220 Sahiwal-I
| Party | Candidate | Votes | % | ±% |
|---|---|---|---|---|
| PML(N) | Khizer Hayat | 44,011 | 41.50 | |
| Independent | Manzoor Ali | 18,736 | 17.67 | |
| PML(Q) | Pir Muhammad Muzaffar Shah Khagga | 12,921 | 12.18 | |
| PTI | Sajjad Nasir | 8,742 | 8.24 | |
| SIC | Nazar Muhammad Fatyana | 8,112 | 7.65 | |
| Independent | Pir Zafar Shah Khagga | 7,780 | 7.34 | |
| Independent | Sikhawat Ali Khan | 5,285 | 4.98 | |
| Others | Others (three candidates) | 472 | 0.45 | |
| Turnout | | 110,320 | 61.76 | |
| Total valid votes | | 106,059 | 96.14 | |
| Rejected ballots | | 4,261 | 3.86 | |
| Majority | | 25,275 | 23.83 | |
| Registered electors | | 178,625 | | |

== General elections 2008 ==
| Contesting candidates | Party affiliation | Votes polled |

In 2008, Wilayat Shah (PML-Q) won from this constituency, while his opponent, Haji Muhammad Mansha Sipra was the candidate of the Pakistan Muslim League-Nawaz, But not Successful.

== See also ==
- PP-197 Pakpattan-V
- PP-199 Sahiwal-II
