= NA-140 Pakpattan-II =

Constituency of the National Assembly of Pakistan

- Constituency for the National Assembly of Pakistan
- Region: Arifwala Tehsil and Pakpattan Tehsil (partly) of Pakpattan District
- Electorate: 598,767

Current constituency
- Party: Pakistan Muslim League (N)
- Member: Rana Iradat Sharif Khan
- Created from: NA-166 Pakpattan-III

NA-140 Pakpattan-II (این اے-140، پاکپتّن-٢) is a constituency for the National Assembly of Pakistan. It mainly comprises Arifwala Tehsil, along with some Kalyana patwar circles of Pakpattan Tehsil.

== Members of Parliament ==
2018–2023: NA-146 Pakpattan-II
Election	Member	Party
2018	Rana Iradat Sharif Khan	PML (N)

2024–present: NA-140 Pakpattan-II
Election	Member	Party
2024	Rana Iradat Sharif Khan	PML (N)

== Election 2002 ==
General elections were held on 10 October 2002. Junaid Mumtaz Joiya of PML-Q won by 58,699 votes.

General election 2002: NA-166 Pakpattan-III
Party	Candidate	Votes	%	±%
PML(Q)	Dr. Junaid Mumtaz Joya	58,699	48.43	
PML(N)	Rana Zahid Hussain	56,712	46.79	
PPP	Tikka Hamad Muhammad Khan	5,076	4.19	
Others	Others (two candidates)	723	0.59	
Turnout		124,469	49.98	
Total valid votes		121,210	97.38	
Rejected ballots		3,259	2.62	
Majority		1,987	1.64	
Registered electors		249,043		

== Election 2008 ==
General elections were held on 18 February 2008. Rana Zahid Hussain Khan of PML-N won by 66,418 votes.

General election 2008: NA-166 Pakpattan-III
Party	Candidate	Votes	%	±%
PML(N)	Rana Zahid Hussain	66,418	53.77	
PML(Q)	Dr. Junaid Mumtaz Joya	42,860	34.70	
PPP	Naeem Mehmood Rana	13,522	10.95	
Others	Others (two candidates)	730	0.58	
Turnout		128,345	57.92	
Total valid votes		123,530	96.25	
Rejected ballots		4,815	3.75	
Majority		23,558	19.07	
Registered electors		221,602		
PML(N) gain from PML(Q)				

== Election 2013 ==
General elections were held on 11 May 2013. Rana Zahid Hussain of PML-N won by 87,209 votes and became the member of National Assembly.

General election 2013: NA-166 Pakpattan-III
Party	Candidate	Votes	%	±%
PML(N)	Rana Zahid Hussain	87,209	46.06	
PTI	Mian Muhammad Amjad Joyia	49,270	26.02	
Independent	Asghar Ali Jutt	30,941	16.34	
PML(Q)	Raja Talia Saeed Khan	10,853	5.73	
Others	Others (ten candidates)	11,071	5.85	
Turnout		196,495	67.28	
Total valid votes		189,344	96.36	
Rejected ballots		7,151	3.64	
Majority		37,939	20.04	
Registered electors		292,076		
PML(N) hold				

== Election 2018 ==
General elections were held on 25 July 2018.

General election 2018: NA-146 Pakpattan-II
Party	Candidate	Votes	%	±%
PML(N)	Rana Iradat Sharif Khan	138,789	46.42	
PTI	Mian Muhammad Amjad Joya	101,509	33.95	
Others	Others (twelve candidates)	58,682	19.63	
Turnout		307,419	59.55	
Total valid votes		298,980	97.25	
Rejected ballots		8,439	2.75	
Majority		37,280	12.47	
Registered electors		516,209		
PML(N) hold		Swing	N/A	

== Election 2024 ==
General elections were held on 8 February 2024. Rana Iradat Sharif Khan won the election with 139,434 votes.

General election 2024: NA-140 Pakpattan-II
Party	Candidate	Votes	%	±%
PML(N)	Rana Iradat Sharif Khan	139,434	43.11	▼3.11
PTI	Raja Talia Saeed (Note: Filed nomination papers as PTI candidate but ECP allowed him to run as an Independent)	104,915	32.44	▼1.51
TLP	Waseem Zafar	27,025	8.36	▲5.06
Others	Others (nineteen candidates)	52,064	16.10	
Turnout		333,995	55.78	▼3.77
Total valid votes		323,438	96.84	
Rejected ballots		10,557	3.16	
Majority		34,519	10.67	▼1.80
Registered electors		598,767		
PML(N) hold		Swing	N/A	

== See also ==
- NA-139 Pakpattan-I
- NA-141 Sahiwal-I
