= Chak Bedi =

چکبیدی
- Town
- Chak Bedi
- Location within Pakistan
- Coordinates: 30°28′29.51″N 73°31′6.373″E
- Country: Pakistan
- Province: Punjab
- District: Pakpattan
- Elevation: 167 m (548 ft)
- Time zone: UTC+05:00 (PST)

Chak Bedi (Urdu: چکبیدی), is a historical town of Pakpattan a district in Punjab. It is part of Pakpattan Tehsil. It is one of the largest town of Pakpattan District.

== Location ==
It lies on the Pakpattan-Depalpur Road (Previously Delhi Multan Road) about 57 kilometers (35.00 miles) away from Sahiwal, a Division of Punjab Province.

== Geography ==
Chak Bedi is approximately centered at 30°28′29.51″N 73°31′6.373″E with the altitude of 167 metres (490 ft). It is located on the Pakpattan-Depalpur road, only 20 km (approx.) from Pakpattan.
