= Zahid Hussain =

Zahid Hussain may refer to:

- Zahid Husain (banker) (1895–1957), Pakistani banker
- Zahid Hussain (author) (born 1972), British writer of fiction and poetry
- Zahid Hussain (cricketer) (born 1974), Canadian cricketer
- Zahid Hussain (journalist) (born 1949), Pakistani journalist and non-fiction author
- Rana Zahid Hussain (born 1954), politician in Pakistan's National Assembly
- Sayed Zahid Hussain (born 1949), Pakistani Supreme Court judge
