= Bunga Hayat =

Town in Punjab, Pakistan

Bunga Hayat (Pakistan)

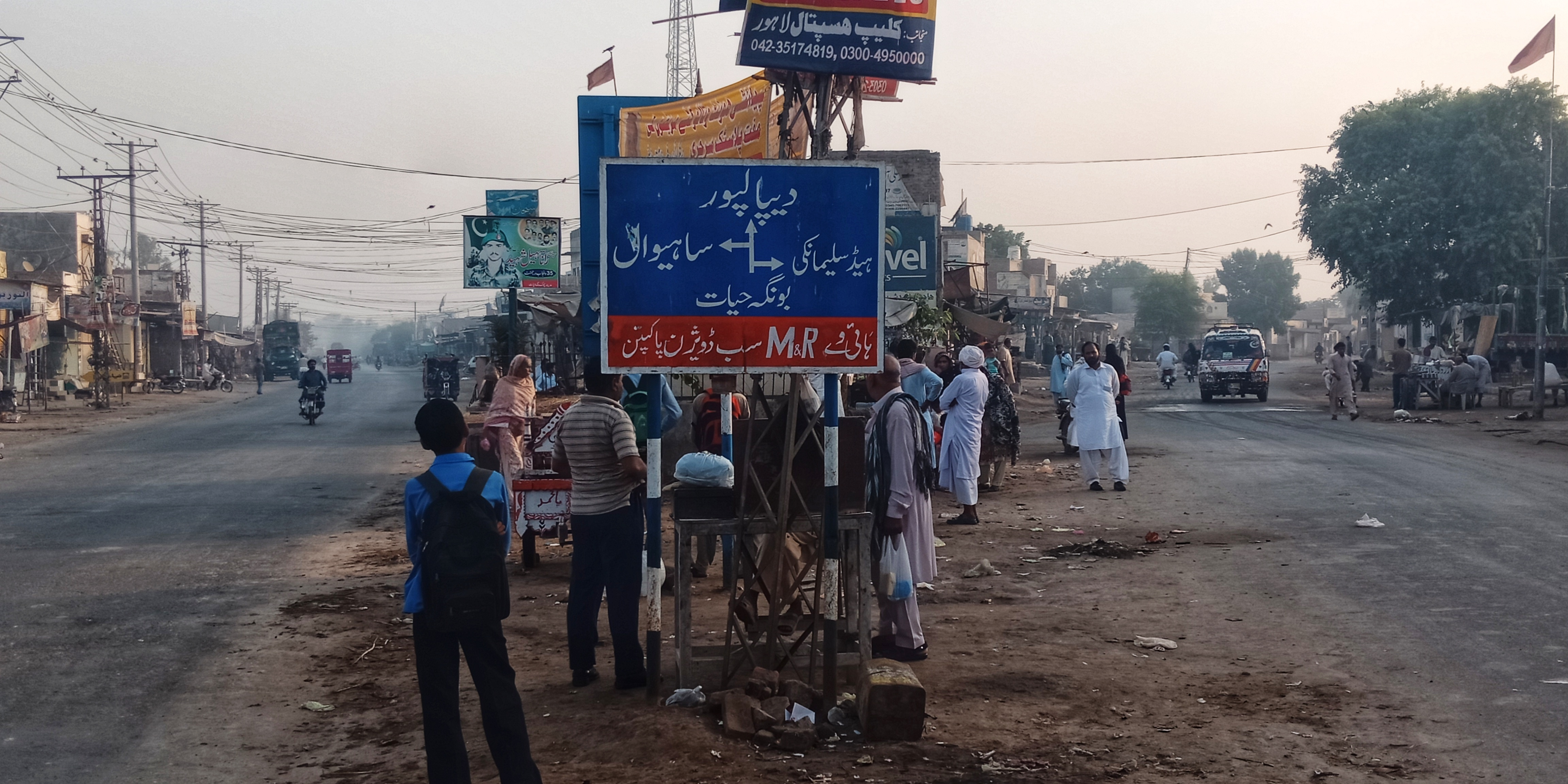
Madina Chowk, Bunga Hayat

Bunga Hayat is a small town in Pakpattan District of Punjab, Pakistan, with a population of 10,000.

== Administrative Division ==
Bunga Hayat is Union Council #3 among 28 Union Councils of Tehsil Pakpattan.

== Constituency ==
NA:145

PP:191
