= Ahmad Shah Khagga =

Pakistani politician

Member of the Provincial Assembly of the Punjab
- In office 15 August 2018 – 14 January 2023
- Constituency: PP-193 Pakpattan-III
- In office 29 May 2013 – 31 May 2018
- Constituency: PP-229 (Pakpattan-III)

Personal details
- Born: 24 September 1966 (age 60) Pakpattan, Punjab, Pakistan
- Party: TLP (2025–present)
- Other political affiliations: IPP (2023–2025); PTI (2018–2023); PML(Q) (2013–2018)

Ahmad Shah Khagga (born 24 September 1966) is a Pakistani politician who had been a member of the Provincial Assembly of the Punjab from August 2018 till January 2023. Previously he was a Member of the Provincial Assembly of the Punjab from May 2013 to May 2018. He has been member of privilege committee and member of planning and development committee from 2013 to 2018. He was also in office as Parliamentary Secretary of Energy.

== Early life ==
He was born on 24 September 1966 in Pakpattan.

== Political career ==
He was elected to the Provincial Assembly of the Punjab as a candidate of the Pakistan Muslim League (Q) (PML-Q) from PP-229 (Pakpattan-III) in the 2013 Punjab provincial election.

In April 2018, he left the PML-Q and joined the Pakistan Tehreek-e-Insaf (PTI).

He was re-elected to the Provincial Assembly of the Punjab as a candidate of the PTI from PP-193 (Pakpattan-III) in the 2018 Punjab provincial election.
