= PP-200 Sahiwal-III =

Constituency of the Punjabi Provincial Legislature, Pakistan

- Constituency for the Provincial Assembly of Punjab
- Region: Sahiwal Tehsil (partly) including Sahiwal city southern and Kameer town of Sahiwal District

Current constituency
- Created from: PP-223 Sahiwal-IV (2002-2018); PP-198 Sahiwal-III (2018-2023)

PP-200 Sahiwal-III (پی پی-200، ساہيوال-3) is a Constituency of Provincial Assembly of Punjab.

== General elections 2024 ==
Provincial election 2024: PP-200 Sahiwal-III
Party	Candidate	Votes	%	±%
PML(N)	Mohammad Arshad Malik	48,657	40.14	
Independent	Ahmad Ali	37,695	31.10	
Independent	Asad Ali Khan	10,356	8.54	
TLP	Faizan Ali	6,959	5.74	
PPP	Asif Ahmad	4,911	4.05	
Independent	Muhammad Haroon	3,801	3.14	
Independent	Mahmood Khalid	2,639	2.18	
Others	Others (sixteen candidates)	6,200	5.11	
Turnout		125,470	51.41	
Total valid votes		121,218	96.61	
Rejected ballots		4,252	3.39	
Majority		10,962	9.04	
Registered electors		244,044		
hold				

== General elections 2018 ==
Provincial election 2018: PP-198 Sahiwal-III
Party	Candidate	Votes	%	±%
PML(N)	Mohammad Arshad Malik	46,301	39.68	
PTI	Mailk Faisal Ahmad Dhakku	31,225	26.76	
Independent	Chaudhary Asif Ali	25,255	21.64	
PPP	Muhammad Mazhar Iqbal	3,413	2.93	
Independent	Jahan Khan	3,001	2.57	
Independent	Anwar Ali	2,892	2.48	
TLP	Muhammad Asghar Chishti	2,472	2.12	
Others	Others (seven candidates)	2,133	1.83	
Turnout		120,262	59.43	
Total valid votes		116,692	97.03	
Rejected ballots		3,570	2.97	
Majority		15,076	12.92	
Registered electors		202,363		

== General elections 2013 ==
Provincial election 2013: PP-223 Sahiwal-IV
Party	Candidate	Votes	%	±%
PML(N)	Muhammad Arshad Khan Lodhi	42,563	52.34	
PTI	Mehr Irshad Hussain Kathia	16,785	20.64	
Independent	Muhammad Hafeez Akhtar Chaudhary	16,728	20.57	
Independent	Rana Muhammad Irshad Khan	1,534	1.89	
MQM-P	Barki Minhas	1,513	1.86	
Others	Others (five candidates)	2,190	2.69	
Turnout		83,943	59.94	
Total valid votes		81,313	96.87	
Rejected ballots		2,630	3.13	
Majority		25,778	31.70	
Registered electors		140,048		

== General elections 2008 ==
Contesting candidates	Party affiliation	Votes polled

== See also ==
- PP-199 Sahiwal-II
- PP-201 Sahiwal-IV
