= PP-187 Okara-III =

Constituency of the Provincial Assembly of Punjab, Pakistan.

- Constituency for the Provincial Assembly of Punjab
- Region: Depalpur Tehsil (partly) including Basirpur and Ahmedabad towns of Okara District

Current constituency
- Created from: PP-188 Okara-IV (2002-2018); PP-185 Okara-III (2018-2023)

PP-187 Okara-III (پی پی-187، اوكاڑا-3) is a Constituency of Provincial Assembly of Punjab. Mirza Ali Raza Baig and Chaudhary Iftikhar Hussain Chachar have been among the prominent political figures in PP-187 Okara, contesting several elections against each other. Mirza Baig has contested four elections and won one, while Iftikhar Chachar held the seat for three consecutive terms.

== General elections 2024 ==
Provincial election 2024: PP-187 Okara-III
| Party | Candidate | Votes | % | ±% |
|---|---|---|---|---|
| PML(N) | Chaudhry Iftikhar Hussain Chhachhar | 60,707 | 44.30 | |
| Independent | Mian Muhammad Fayyaz | 37,369 | 27.27 | |
| Independent | Mirza Ali Raza | 22,668 | 16.54 | |
| TLP | Mian Ghulam Rasool | 7,993 | 5.83 | |
| Others | Others (fifteen candidates) | 8,298 | 6.06 | |
| Turnout | | 141,379 | 55.47 | |
| Total valid votes | | 137,035 | 96.93 | |
| Rejected ballots | | 4,344 | 3.07 | |
| Majority | | 23,338 | 17.06 | |
| Registered electors | | 254,859 | | |
| hold | | | | |

== General elections 2018 ==
Provincial election 2018: PP-185 Okara-III
| Party | Candidate | Votes | % | ±% |
|---|---|---|---|---|
| PML(N) | Chaudhry Iftikhar Hussain Chhachhar | 48,921 | 41.34 | |
| PTI | Mirza Ali Raza | 42,641 | 36.03 | |
| Independent | Robina Shaheen Wattoo | 13,797 | 11.66 | |
| Independent | Mian Muhammad Fayyaz | 5,476 | 4.63 | |
| TLP | Syed Ghulam Ali Shah | 2,669 | 2.26 | |
| Independent | Syed Ali Asim Kirmani | 1,405 | 1.19 | |
| Others | Others (sixteen candidates) | 3,425 | 2.89 | |
| Turnout | | 122,149 | 57.85 | |
| Total valid votes | | 118,334 | 96.88 | |
| Rejected ballots | | 3,815 | 3.12 | |
| Majority | | 6,280 | 5.31 | |
| Registered electors | | 211,145 | | |

== General elections 2013 ==
Provincial election 2013: PP-188 Okara-IV
| Party | Candidate | Votes | % | ±% |
|---|---|---|---|---|
| PML(N) | Chaudry Iftikhar Hussain Chachar | 47,222 | 56.59 | |
| PPP | Mian Manzoor Ahmad Khan Wattoo | 25,107 | 30.09 | |
| Independent | Mirza Ali Raza | 18,058 | 19.26 | |
| PTI | Sardar Javed Iqbal Khan Wattoo | 2,713 | 2.25 | |
| Independent | Robina Shaheen Wattoo | 1,430 | 1.71 | |
| Others | Others (six candidates) | 912 | 1.09 | |
| Turnout | | 86,423 | 62.69 | |
| Total valid votes | | 93,442 | 96.55 | |
| Rejected ballots | | 2,981 | 3.45 | |
| Majority | | 22,115 | 26.50 | |
| Registered electors | | 137,862 | | |

== General elections 2008 ==
Provincial election 2008: PP-188 Okara-IV
| Party | Candidate | Votes | % | ±% |
|---|---|---|---|---|
| PML(N) | Mirza Ali Raza Baig | 29,252 | 35.58 | |
| Independent | Chaudhary Iftikhar Hussain Chachar | 16,248 | 22.09 | |
| Independent | Mian Muhammad Fayyaz Khan Wattoo | 15,904 | 21.41 | |
| PTI | Mian Ahmad Shujjah Wattoo | 644 | 2.25 | |
| Independent | Sardar Yaseen | 504 | 1.71 | |
| Others | Others (six candidates) | 3,912 | 5.09 | |
| Turnout | | 78,892 | 62.69 | |
| Total valid votes | | 75,442 | 96.55 | |
| Rejected ballots | | 2,981 | 3.45 | |
| Majority | | 13,004 | 8.45 | |
| Registered electors | | 113,922 | | |

== See also ==
- PP-186 Okara-II
- PP-188 Okara-IV
