= Rana Iradat Sharif Khan =

Pakistani politician

Member of the National Assembly of Pakistan
- Incumbent
- Assumed office 29 February 2024
- Constituency: NA-140 Pakpattan-II
- In office 13 August 2018 – 10 August 2023
- Constituency: NA-146 (Pakpattan-II)

Personal details
- Party: PMLN (2018-present)
- Parent: Rana Zahid Hussain (father)

Rana Iradat Sharif Khan is a Pakistani politician who has been a member of the National Assembly of Pakistan since February 2024 and previously served in this position from August 2018 till August 2023.

== Early life ==
Rana Iradat Sharif Khan was born to father Rana Zahid Hussain, who was also a member of the National Assembly. His family originates from the city of Arifwala.

== Political career ==
He was elected to the National Assembly of Pakistan from NA-146 (Pakpattan-II) as a candidate of Pakistan Muslim League (N) in the 2018 Pakistani general election.

He was re-elected to the National Assembly from NA-140 Pakpattan-II as a candidate of PML(N) in the 2024 Pakistani general election. He received 139,434 votes and defeated Raja Talia Saeed, an independent candidate supported by Pakistan Tehreek-e-Insaf (PTI).
