= Chak 59 EB =

Village in Pakistan

Coordinates: 30°17′35″N 72°59′9″E

Chak No. 59/EB is the nearest village to Arifwala city, Punjab, Pakistan. It is about 1 km far away from the main city. It is the biggest village of the union council 29 of Arifwala. It is located in the north of the city. The population is almost 25,000 and the total area is 57 Maraba Acar.

Majority of the people belongs to Syed caste specially Shah, Rana, Bhatties and Joyias.

There are two government schools, one boys middle school and a girls middle school. A new public park has been built. The majority of people are educated. The residential gas connection has not been approved yet.
