= Chak Shafi =

Chak Shafi چک شفیع
- Village
- Location in Punjab, Pakistan
- Coordinates: 30.3700702°N 73.2214736°E
- Country: Pakistan
- Province: Punjab
- District: Pakpattan
- Tehsil: Arifwala
- Union council: Shafi

Population (1998)
  - Total: 8,535
- Time zone: GST +5
- Post code: 57151

Chak Shafi is a village in Arifwala tehsil in the Pakpattan district of Punjab province, Pakistan. The village's population was 8,535 at the time of the 1998 census, 8,504 of whom were categorised as Muslim. Shafi is also the name of the wider union council area, which had a recorded population of 22,635 in 1998.

There are two high schools in the village: Government High School Chak Shafi and Government Girls High School Chak Shafi.
