= PP-186 Okara-II =

Constituency of the Provincial Assembly of Punjab, Pakistan

- Constituency for the Provincial Assembly of Punjab
- Region: Depalpur Tehsil (partly) including Hujra town and Renala Khurd Tehsil (partly) of Okara District

Current constituency
- Created from: PP-186 Okara-IV (2002–2018); PP-184 Okara-II (2018–2023)

PP-186 Okara-II (پی پی-186، اوكاڑا-2) is a Constituency of Provincial Assembly of Punjab.

== General elections 2024 ==
Provincial election 2024: PP-186 Okara-II
Party	Candidate	Votes	%	±%
PML(N)	Syed M Ashiq Hussain Shah	43,255	31.80	
Independent	Syed Gulzar Hasnain (Note: Filed nomination papers as PTI candidate but ECP allowed him to run as an Independent)	32,231	23.70	
Independent	Rai Mushtaq Ahmad	23,425	17.22	
TLP	Sakhawat Ali Naz	11,983	8.81	
Independent	Syed Raza Ali Gillani	7,864	5.78	
Independent	Sardar Shehryar Mokal	6,424	4.72	
PPP	Syed Ali Hassnain Shah Naqvi	3,938	2.90	
Others	Others (nineteen candidates)	6,895	5.07	
Turnout		141,264	55.43	
Total valid votes		136,015	96.28	
Rejected ballots		5,249	3.72	
Majority		11,024	8.10	
Registered electors		254,838		
hold				

== General elections 2018 ==
Provincial election 2018: PP-184 Okara-II
Party	Candidate	Votes	%	±%
Independent	Syeda Maimanat Mohsin	63,226	48.49	
Independent	Syed Raza Ali Gillani	41,621	31.92	
TLP	Nasir Abbas	7,207	5.53	
PTI-N	Muhammad Iqbal	5,439	4.17	
PPP	Syed Ali Husnain Shah	5,406	4.15	
Independent	Zohair Akbar Moakal	4,018	3.08	
Independent	Syed Muratab Ali Kirmani	1,412	1.08	
Others	Others (seven candidates)	2,050	1.58	
Turnout		133,241	58.65	
Total valid votes		130,379	97.85	
Rejected ballots		2,862	2.15	
Majority		21,605	16.57	
Registered electors		227,201		

== General elections 2013 ==
Provincial election 2013: PP-186 Okara-II
Party	Candidate	Votes	%	±%
PML(N)	Javaid Alla-ud-Din Sajid	38,178	36.01	
PPP	Rao Muhammad Qaisar Khan	16,069	15.16	
Independent	Mehr Muhammad Iqbal	14,812	13.97	
PTI	Wasi Tahir Chaudhry	7,699	7.26	
Independent	Chaudhry Ishtiaq Ahmad	7,146	6.74	
Independent	Nadeem Ashraf	6,329	5.97	
Independent	Peer Muhammad Minhaj-Ul-Islam	5,360	5.06	
PML(Q)	Doctor Azhar Mahmood Chaudhry	4,252	4.01	
Independent	Ijaz Ali Rao	3,386	3.19	
JUI (F)	Mujahid Ali Awan	1,076	1.01	
Others	Others (fifteen candidates)	1,713	1.62	
Turnout		110,525	62.37	
Total valid votes		106,020	95.92	
Rejected ballots		4,505	4.08	
Majority		22,109	20.85	
Registered electors		177,214		

== General elections 20088 ==
General Election 2008: Okara
Party	Candidate	Votes	%
Independent	Bushra Mahfooz	47,243	72%
Independent	Dr Kamran Khalid	14,783	14%
Pakistan Muslim League Q	Sajjad Ahmad Awan	1,873	1%
Others	Others	948	1%

== See also ==
- PP-185 Okara-I
- PP-187 Okara-III
