= PP-202 Sahiwal-V =

Constituency of the Punjabi Provincial Legislature, Pakistan

- Constituency for the Provincial Assembly of Punjab
- Region: Chichawatni Tehsil (partly) and Sahiwal Tehsil (partly) of Sahiwal District

Current constituency
- Created from: PP-224 Sahiwal-V (2002-2018); PP-200 Sahiwal-V (2018-2023)

PP-202 Sahiwal-V (پی پی-202، ساہيوال-5) is a Constituency of Provincial Assembly of Punjab.

== General elections 2024 ==
Provincial election 2024: PP-202 Sahiwal-V
| Party | Candidate | Votes | % | ±% |
|---|---|---|---|---|
| PML(N) | Rana Riaz Ahmad | 40,477 | 28.23 | |
| Independent | Waheed Asghar (Note: Filed nomination papers as PTI candidate but ECP allowed him to run as an Independent) | 40,073 | 27.95 | |
| Independent | Sajjad Hussain | 22,218 | 15.49 | |
| PPP | Shehzad Saeed Cheema | 16,404 | 11.44 | |
| TLP | Ghulam Hussain | 10,706 | 7.47 | |
| Independent | Muhammad Imran | 4,761 | 3.32 | |
| Others | Others (twelve candidates) | 8,761 | 6.10 | |
| Turnout | | 147,699 | 55.69 | |
| Total valid votes | | 143,400 | 97.09 | |
| Rejected ballots | | 4,299 | 2.91 | |
| Majority | | 404 | 0.28 | |
| Registered electors | | 265,194 | | |
| hold | | | | |

== General elections 2018 ==
Provincial election 2018: PP-200 Sahiwal-V
| Party | Candidate | Votes | % | ±% |
|---|---|---|---|---|
| PML(N) | Rana Riaz Ahmad | 48,989 | 42.86 | |
| PTI | Waheed Asghar | 38,967 | 34.09 | |
| PPP | Shehzad Saeed Cheema | 21,195 | 18.54 | |
| MMA | Umair Javed | 2,435 | 2.13 | |
| Independent | Ameer Hamza | 1,827 | 1.60 | |
| Others | Others (two candidates) | 891 | 0.79 | |
| Turnout | | 116,693 | 53.98 | |
| Total valid votes | | 114,304 | 97.95 | |
| Rejected ballots | | 2,389 | 2.05 | |
| Majority | | 10,022 | 8.77 | |
| Registered electors | | 216,165 | | |

== General elections 2013 ==
Provincial election 2013: PP-224 Sahiwal-V
| Party | Candidate | Votes | % | ±% |
|---|---|---|---|---|
| PTI | Waheed Asghar | 42,676 | 40.94 | |
| PML(N) | Basit Riaz | 35,049 | 33.62 | |
| PPP | Shehzad Saeed Cheema | 16,535 | 15.86 | |
| Independent | Muhammad Ayub | 8,617 | 8.27 | |
| Others | Others (seven candidates) | 1,373 | 1.32 | |
| Turnout | | 107,892 | 60.25 | |
| Total valid votes | | 104,250 | 96.62 | |
| Rejected ballots | | 3,642 | 3.38 | |
| Majority | | 7,627 | 7.32 | |
| Registered electors | | 179,075 | | |

== General elections 2008 ==
| Contesting candidates | Party affiliation | Votes polled |

== See also ==
- PP-201 Sahiwal-IV
- PP-203 Sahiwal-VI
