= Syed Imran Ahmed Shah =

Pakistani politician

- سید عمران احمد شاہ

Federal Minister for Poverty Alleviation and Social Safety
- Incumbent
- Assumed office 7 March 2025
- President: Asif Ali Zardari
- Prime Minister: Shehbaz Sharif

Member of National Assembly of Pakistan
- Incumbent
- Assumed office 29 February 2024
- Constituency: NA-141 Sahiwal-I
- In office 13 August 2018 – 10 August 2023
- Constituency: NA-147 (Sahiwal-I)
- In office 2008 – 31 May 2018
- Constituency: NA-160 (Sahiwal-I)

Personal details
- Born: 16 August 1962 (age 64)
- Party: PMLN (2002-present)

Syed Imran Ahmad Shah (Urdu: سید عمران احمد شاہ; born 16 August 1962) is a Pakistani politician who has been a member of the National Assembly of Pakistan since February 2024 and previously served in this position from August 2018 till August 2023 and from 2008 to May 2018.

== Political career ==
He ran for the seat of the National Assembly of Pakistan as a candidate of Pakistan Muslim League (N) (PML-N) from Constituency NA-160 (Sahiwal-I) in the 2002 Pakistani general election but was unsuccessful. He received 43,241 votes and lost the seat to Nouraiz Shakoor.

In the 2002 Pakistani general elections, Shah contested for a seat in the National Assembly as a candidate for the Pakistan Muslim League (N) (PML-N). He ran from the NA-160 (Sahiwal-I) constituency. Despite securing 43,241 votes, he was unsuccessful in his bid, losing the seat to Nouraiz Shakoor. During this campaign, he was part of a coordinated PML-N panel in the region, which included Malik Nadeem Kamran Ex Provincial Minister(contesting PP-221) and Haji Muhammad Mansha Sipra Ex Director General Agricultural(contesting PP-220).

He was elected to the National Assembly as a candidate of PML-N from Constituency NA-160 (Sahiwal-I) in the 2008 Pakistani general election. He received 59,373 votes and defeated Nouraiz Shakoor.

He was re-elected to the National Assembly as a candidate of PML-N from Constituency NA-160 (Sahiwal-I) in the 2013 Pakistani general election. He received 99,553 votes and defeated Muhammad Ali Shakoor, a candidate of Pakistan Tehreek-e-Insaf (PTI).

In October 2017, he was appointed as chairperson of the National Assembly's standing committees on privatization.

He was re-elected to the National Assembly as a candidate of PML-N from Constituency NA-147 (Sahiwal-I) in the 2018 Pakistani general election.

He was re-elected to the National Assembly in the 2024 Pakistani general election as a candidate of PML-N from NA-141 Sahiwal-I. He received 118,242 votes, defeating Rana Amir Shahzad Tahir, an Independent politician candidate supported by PTI, who secured 107,060 votes.
