= PP-185 Okara-I =

Constituency of the Provincial Assembly of Punjab, Pakistan

- Constituency for the Provincial Assembly of Punjab
- Region: Renala Khurd Tehsil (partly) of Okara District

Current constituency
- Created from: PP-185 Okara-I (2002-2018); PP-183 Okara-I (2018-2023)

PP-185 Okara-I (پی پی-185، اوكاڑا-1) is a Constituency of Provincial Assembly of Punjab.

== General elections 2024 ==
Provincial election 2024: PP-185 Okara-I
Party	Candidate	Votes	%	±%
PML(N)	Javed Alloud Din Sajid	52,341	33.46	
Independent	Muhammad Javed (Note: Filed nomination papers as PTI candidate but ECP allowed him to run as an Independent)	46,826	29.94	
Independent	Riaz Ijaz	29,517	18.87	
TLP	Muhammad Altaf	14,527	9.29	
PPP	Nadeem Mushtaq	7,170	4.58	
JI	Rai Ateeq Ur Rehman Kharal	2,617	1.67	
Others	Others (fourteen candidates)	3,413	2.19	
Turnout		160,142	57.97	
Total valid votes		156,411	97.51	
Rejected ballots		3,731	2.49	
Majority		5,515	3.52	
Registered electors		276,271		
hold				

== General elections 2018 ==
Provincial election 2018: PP-183 Okara-I
Party	Candidate	Votes	%	±%
PML(N)	Javed Alloud Din Sajid	42,493	33.24	
PTI	Muhammed Javed	29,812	23.32	
Independent	Malik Muhammad Akram Bhatti	17,462	13.66	
Independent	Muhammad Arif Lashari	14,354	11.23	
TLP	Farzand Naseem	7,794	6.10	
Independent	Rao Abid Javed Khan	5,191	4.06	
PPP	Rana Abdul Rehman	4,271	3.34	
Independent	Faizan Akram	1,676	1.31	
Others	Others (eight candidates)	4,770	3.74	
Turnout		131,727	59.92	
Total valid votes		127,823	97.04	
Rejected ballots		3,904	2.96	
Majority		12,681	9.92	
Registered electors		219,837		

== General elections 2013 ==
Provincial election 2013: PP-185 Okara-I
Party	Candidate	Votes	%	±%
PML(N)	Sameena Noor	26,886	29.19	
Independent	Malik Muhammad Akram Bhatti	24,986	27.13	
PPP	Muhammad Arif Lashari	11,006	11.95	
PTI	Mian Muhammad Anwer Pasha	8,819	9.58	
PML(Q)	Sarfraz Hussain Bhatti	6,067	6.59	
Independent	Habib Ullah	6,019	6.54	
TTP	Ch. Muhammad Yasin Gujar	5,027	5.46	
Independent	Mian Muhammad Javed	1,143	1.24	
Others	Others (eight candidates)	2,145	2.33	
Turnout		96,672	61.94	
Total valid votes		92,098	95.27	
Rejected ballots		4,574	4.73	
Majority		1,900	2.06	
Registered electors		156,085		

== General elections 2008 ==
General Election 2008: Okara
Party	Candidate	Votes	%
Independent	Mahfooz Khan	52,739	53%
Pakistan Muslim League Q	Akram Bukhari	17,832	14%
Independent	Sajjad Awan	6,008	2%
Others	Others	217	0.5%

== See also ==
- PP-184 Kasur-X
- PP-186 Okara-II
