= Pakpatan Hydropower Plant =

Dam in Pakpattan, Pakistan

Pakpattan Hydropower Plant
- Location in Punjab Province
- Official name: Pakpattan Hydropower Plant
- Location: Pakpattan, Punjab, Pakistan
- Coordinates: 30°34′50″N 73°38′50″E
- Purpose: Flood control, power
- Status: Operational
- Construction began: January 2010 (completed on 4 March 2016)
- Opening date: 25 March 2017
- Owner: Punjab Power Management Unit (PPMU)

Dam and spillways
- Type of dam: RCC
- Impounds: Upper Pakpattan Canal

Power Station
- Commission date: 2017
- Hydraulic head: 4.2 m (14 ft)
- Turbines: 2 x 1.42 MW Kaplan-type
- Installed capacity: 2.82 MW

The Pakpattan Hydropower Plant (Urdu: پاکپتن ہائیڈرو پاور پلانٹ) is a small hydro, low head project of 4.2 metres, located in the Pakpattan District on the Upper Chenab Canal, in Punjab, Pakistan. It is approximately 245 km from the provincial capital of Lahore.

The total electricity generation capacity of the Pakpattan Hydropower Plant is 2.82 MW.

== Financing ==
Asian Development Bank (ADB) provided a loan of US$28.435 million from July 2009 onwards to complete the works on the project. The total cost of the project is estimated to be PKR 3.3 billion.

== Construction ==
Power House is in commercial operation since 25 March 2017. The Chinese firm handed over the Project to PPDCL on 8 March 2017.

Dam:
Type: Small hydro
Design Discharge: 2800 Cusecs
Design Head: 4.2 m.

== See also ==
- List of dams and reservoirs in Pakistan
- List of power stations in Pakistan
- Marala Hydropower Project
- Chianwali Dam
- Deg Outfall Dam
- Duber Khwar hydropower project
