= PP-188 Okara-IV =

Constituency of the Provincial Assembly of Punjab, Pakistan

- Constituency for the Provincial Assembly of Punjab
- Region: Depalpur Tehsil (partly) including Haveli Lakha town of Okara District

Current constituency
- Created from: PP-193 Okara-IX (2002-2018); PP-186 Okara-IV (2018-2023)

PP-188 Okara-IV (پی پی-188، اوكاڑا-4) is a Constituency of Provincial Assembly of Punjab. It was previously known as PP-193 (Okara IX).

== General elections 2024 ==
Provincial election 2024: PP-188 Okara-IV
Party	Candidate	Votes	%	±%
PML(N)	Noorulamin Wattoo	56,694	41.29	
Independent	Moazzam Jahanzaib Wattoo	37,942	27.64	
Independent	Sardar Ali Haider Khan (Note: Filed nomination papers as PTI candidate but ECP allowed him to run as an Independent)	24,303	17.70	
TLP	Waseem Rasool	9,813	7.15	
PPP	Ahmed Hassan	3,515	2.56	
Independent	Malik Muhammad Ghazanfar Ali Khokhar	2,026	1.48	
Others	Others (seventeen candidates)	3,000	2.18	
Turnout		140,875	55.85	
Total valid votes		137,293	97.46	
Rejected ballots		3,582	2.54	
Majority		18,752	13.65	
Registered electors		252,216		
hold				

== General elections 2018 ==
Provincial election 2018: PP-186 Okara-IV
Party	Candidate	Votes	%	±%
PML(N)	Noorulamin Wattoo	57,463	46.88	
PTI	Mian Khurram Jahangir Wattoo	50,339	41.07	
TLP	Malik Muhammad Ghazanafar Ali Knokhar	6,633	5.41	
Independent	Fakhar Hayat	2,976	2.43	
MMA	Riaz Farid	1,497	1.22	
Independent	Hammad Aslam	1,039	0.85	
Others	Others (twelve candidates)	2,638	2.14	
Turnout		125,853	57.00	
Total valid votes		122,585	97.40	
Rejected ballots		3,268	2.60	
Majority		7,124	5.81	
Registered electors		220,803		

== General elections 2013 ==
Provincial election 2013: PP-193 Okara-IX
Party	Candidate	Votes	%	±%
PML(N)	Muhammad Moeen Wattoo	30,137	39.30	
PPP	Mian Khuram Jahangir Wattoo	23,479	30.62	
Independent	Dewan Ikhlaq Ahmad	15,940	20.79	
PTI	Javed Ahmad	5,019	6.55	
Others	Others (seven candidates)	2,105	2.75	
Turnout		80,323	60.95	
Total valid votes		76,680	95.46	
Rejected ballots		3,643	4.54	
Majority		6,658	8.68	
Registered electors		131,790		

== General elections 2008 ==
Contesting candidates	Party affiliation	Votes polled

== See also ==
- PP-187 Okara-III
- PP-189 Okara-V
