= PP-201 Sahiwal-IV =

Constituency of the Punjabi Provincial Legislature, Pakistan

- Constituency for the Provincial Assembly of Punjab
- Region: Sahiwal Tehsil (partly) including Harappa city of Sahiwal District

Current constituency
- Created from: PP-222 Sahiwal-III (2002-2018); PP-199 Sahiwal-IV (2018-2023)

PP-201 Sahiwal-IV (پی پی-201، ساہيوال-4) is a Constituency of Provincial Assembly of Punjab.

== General elections 2024 ==
Provincial election 2024: PP-201 Sahiwal-IV
Party	Candidate	Votes	%	±%
PML(N)	Naveed Aslam Khan Lodhi	40,888	33.32	
Independent	Muhammad Yar (Note: Filed nomination papers as PTI candidate but ECP allowed him to run as an Independent)	39,445	32.14	
TLP	Muhammad Khalid	9,629	7.85	
PPP	Muhammad Yousaf	8,718	7.10	
Independent	Mian Hussnain Ali	6,104	4.97	
Independent	Mian Shahid Ali	5,704	4.65	
Independent	Irshad Hussain	3,020	2.46	
PMML	Muhammud Shamshad	2,683	2.19	
Others	Others (eighteen candidates)	6,523	5.32	
Turnout		128,491	52.88	
Total valid votes		122,714	95.50	
Rejected ballots		5,777	4.50	
Majority		1,443	1.18	
Registered electors		242,989		
hold				

== General elections 2018 ==
Provincial election 2018: PP-199 Sahiwal-IV
Party	Candidate	Votes	%	±%
PML(N)	Naveed Aslam Khan Lodhi	41,707	40.07	
PTI	Irshad Hussain	28,187	27.08	
Independent	Muhammad Umer Ishaq Chaudhary	18,810	18.07	
PPP	Muhammad Yousaf	7,563	7.27	
TLP	Rana Tanvir Ahmad Khan	4,723	4.54	
Others	Others (seven candidates)	3,106	2.97	
Turnout		107,071	56.04	
Total valid votes		104,096	97.22	
Rejected ballots		2,975	2.78	
Majority		13,520	12.99	
Registered electors		191,048		

== General elections 2013 ==
Provincial election 2013: PP-222 Sahiwal-III
Party	Candidate	Votes	%	±%
PML(N)	Muhammad Arshad Malik Advocate High Court	37,169	34.46	
Independent	Malik Jalal Ud Din	27,484	25.48	
PTI	Muhammad Umer Ishaq Chaudhary	18,860	17.48	
PML(Q)	Syed Shabbar Mustafa Shirazi	17,309	16.05	
JWP	Muhammad Sadiq Khan Murdana Balouch	5,055	4.69	
Others	Others (fourteen candidates)	1,999	1.85	
Turnout		111,924	62.23	
Total valid votes		107,876	96.38	
Rejected ballots		4,048	3.62	
Majority		9,685	8.98	
Registered electors		179,865		

== General elections 2008 ==
Contesting candidates	Party affiliation	Votes polled

== See also ==
- PP-200 Sahiwal-III
- PP-202 Sahiwal-V
