= NA-141 Sahiwal-I =

Constituency of the National Assembly of Pakistan

- Constituency for the National Assembly of Pakistan
- Region: Sahiwal Tehsil (partly) including Sahiwal City of Sahiwal District
- Electorate: 582,113

Current constituency
- Party: Pakistan Muslim League (N)
- Member: Syed Imran Ahmed Shah
- Created from: NA-160 Sahiwal-I

NA-141 Sahiwal-I (این اے-141، ساہِيوال-۱) is a constituency for the National Assembly of Pakistan.

== Election 2002 ==
General elections were held on 10 October 2002. Chaudhry Noraiz Shakoor Khan of PPP won by 53,174 votes.

General election 2002: NA-160 Sahiwal-I
Party	Candidate	Votes	%	±%
PPP	Nouraiz Shakoor	53,174	48.03	
PML(N)	Syed Imran Ahmed Shah	43,241	39.06	
PML(Q)	Anwar-UI-Haq Ramay	11,671	10.54	
Others	Others (six candidates)	2,615	2.37	
Turnout		113,520	43.16	
Total valid votes		110,701	97.52	
Rejected ballots		2,819	2.48	
Majority		9,933	8.97	
Registered electors		263,042		

== Election 2008 ==
General elections were held on 18 February 2008. Syed Imran Ahmed Shah of PML-N won by 59,373 votes.

General election 2008: NA-160 Sahiwal-I
Party	Candidate	Votes	%	±%
PML(N)	Syed Imran Ahmed Shah	59,373	47.82	
PML(Q)	Nouraiz Shakoor	31,119	25.06	
PPP	Anwar-UI-Haq Ramay	27,638	22.26	
Others	Others (eight candidates)	6,038	4.86	
Turnout		127,867	51.44	
Total valid votes		124,168	97.11	
Rejected ballots		3,699	2.89	
Majority		28,254	22.76	
Registered electors		248,573		
PML(N) gain from PPP				

== Election 2013 ==
General elections were held on 11 May 2013. Syed Imran Ahmed Shah of PML-N won by 99,553 votes and became the member of National Assembly.

General election 2013: NA-160 Sahiwal-I
Party	Candidate	Votes	%	±%
PML(N)	Syed Imran Ahmed Shah	99,553	54.70	
PTI	Muhammad Ali Shakoor	38,023	20.89	
Independent	Rana Amir Shahzad Tahir	22,618	12.43	
PPP	Muhammad Zaki Ch.	13,877	7.63	
Others	Others (fifteen candidates)	7,916	4.35	
Turnout		187,029	60.95	
Total valid votes		181,987	97.30	
Rejected ballots		5,042	2.70	
Majority		61,530	33.81	
Registered electors		306,875		
PML(N) hold				

== Election 2018 ==
General elections are scheduled to be held on 25 July 2018.

General election 2018: NA-147 Sahiwal-I
Party	Candidate	Votes	%	±%
PML(N)	Syed Imran Ahmed Shah	120,924	45.77	
PTI	Nouraiz Shakoor	86,821	32.86	
PPP	Rana Aamir Shehzad Tahir	22,778	8.62	
TLP	Khalid Siddiq Kamyana	11,693	4.43	
Independent	Haroon Zamman Khagga	6,310	2.39	
Independent	Muhammad Ali Shakoor	4,606	1.74	
Independent	Bashir Ahmed	4,124	1.56	
Independent	Hafiz Khalid Mehmmod	3,333	1.26	
Independent	Meeraj Ahmed	1,206	0.46	
Independent	Altaf Nawaz	663	0.25	
TJP	Zafar Iqbal	481	0.18	
Independent	Nazar Fareed Nadeem	452	0.17	
PQYP	Imran Ul Haq	264	0.10	
Pakistan Muslim League Organisation	Adnan Khalid Hussain	211	0.08	
Independent	Muhammad Naeem Asif	191	0.07	
Independent	Aftab Ahmed Khan	119	0.05	
Turnout		270,225	56.18	
Total valid votes		264,176	97.76	
Rejected ballots		6,049	2.24	
Majority		34,103	12.91	
Registered electors		480,979		

== Election 2024 ==
General elections were held on 8 February 2024. Syed Imran Ahmed Shah won the election with 118,242 votes.

General election 2024: NA-141 Sahiwal-I
Party	Candidate	Votes	%	±%
PML(N)	Syed Imran Ahmed Shah	118,242	41.76	▼4.01
PTI	Rana Amir Shahzad Tahir (Note: Filed nomination papers as PTI candidate but ECP allowed him to run as an Independent)	107,060	37.81	▲4.95
PPP	Muhammad Zaki	25,627	9.05	▲0.43
TLP	Abdul Qadir	14,691	5.19	▲0.76
Others	Others (eighteen candidates)	17,547	6.20	
Turnout		290,247	49.83	▼6.35
Total valid votes		283,167	97.56	
Rejected ballots		7,080	2.44	
Majority		11,182	3.95	▼8.96
Registered electors		582,432		
PML(N) hold				

== See also ==
- NA-140 Pakpattan-II
- NA-142 Sahiwal-II
