= PP-190 Okara-VI =

Constituency of the Provincial Assembly of Punjab, Pakistan

- Constituency for the Provincial Assembly of Punjab
- Region: Okara Tehsil (partly) including Okara Cantonment and Okara city area (partly) of Okara District

Current constituency
- Created from: PP-191 Okara-VII (2002-2018); PP-188 Okara-VI (2018-2023)

PP-190 Okara-VI (پی پی-190، اوكاڑا-6) is a Constituency of Provincial Assembly of Punjab.

== General elections 2024 ==
Provincial election 2024: PP-190 Okara-VI
Party	Candidate	Votes	%	±%
PML(N)	Mian Yawar Zaman	63,911	46.31	
Independent	Abdul Sattar (Note: Filed nomination papers as PTI candidate but ECP allowed him to run as an Independent)	52,649	38.15	
TLP	Muhammad Arif	7,321	5.31	
Independent	Muhammad Kashif Warraich	5,576	4.04	
PPP	Javed Norang	2,959	2.14	
JI	Khalid Farooq	2,267	1.64	
Others	Others (ten candidates)	3,331	2.41	
Turnout		142,924	55.83	
Total valid votes		138,014	96.56	
Rejected ballots		4,910	3.44	
Majority		11,262	8.16	
Registered electors		255,996		
hold				

== General elections 2018 ==
Provincial election 2018: PP-188 Okara-VI
Party	Candidate	Votes	%	±%
PML(N)	Mian Yawar Zaman	54,806	47.80	
PTI	Ch. Muhammad Abdullah Tahir	52,246	45.57	
Independent	Rao Ali Jabran Khan Bhopal	2,730	2.38	
PPP	Javed Norang	1,843	1.61	
TLI	Hafiz Shaaban Anmad	1,388	1.21	
Others	Others (eight candidates)	1,636	1.43	
Turnout		117,251	60.69	
Total valid votes		114,649	97.78	
Rejected ballots		2,602	2.22	
Majority		2,560	2.23	
Registered electors		193,193		

== General elections 2013 ==
Provincial election 2013: PP-191 Okara-VII
Party	Candidate	Votes	%	±%
PML(N)	Mian Yawar Zaman	45,739	53.95	
PPP	Abdul Sattar	34,103	40.23	
PTI	Rao Raashid Ali Sher Khan	3,188	3.76	
Others	Others (thirteen candidates)	1,745	2.06	
Turnout		87,420	61.98	
Total valid votes		84,775	96.97	
Rejected ballots		2,645	3.03	
Majority		11,636	13.72	
Registered electors		141,044		

== General elections 2008 ==
Contesting candidates	Party affiliation	Votes polled
Mian Yawar Zaman	PML-N	16975
Abul Sattar	IND	13542
Khalil Akhtar	PML-Q	13341
Rana Ikram Rabbani	PPP	10659

== See also ==
- PP-189 Okara-V
- PP-191 Okara-VII
