= Haji Muhammad Mansha Sipra =

Member of the Provincial Assembly of the Punjab
- In office 2002–2003
- Constituency: PP-186 (Sahiwal)

Personal details
- Born: 1 December 1950 (age 75) Sahiwal, Punjab
- Party: Pakistan Muslim League (N)
- Occupation: Businessman,

Muhammad Mansha Sipra is a Pakistani Civil Servant turned Pesticide Magnate.

Over Time, He Diversified his Business Interests into Textiles and Large-Scale agricultural farming in Southern Punjab.

He also served as a Member of the Provincial Assembly (MPA) in Punjab from 2002 to 2003.

== Career ==
He was a member of the Pakistan men's national volleyball team from 1973 to 1975 and served as captain during thrice international matches.

Mansha left from the Punjab Civil Service (Agriculture Group) in the mid-1980s to join Dow Pacific as Country Manager.

Mansha Sipra subsequently completed a management certification program designed by Harvard Business School (HBS) at Harvard University for senior multinational professionals. He attended the program on behalf of Dow Chemical Limited.

Sipra began his career as a civil servant before moving into the private sector. During the 1990s, he became a leader in the pesticide industry through his company, Agricide, which at one point held nearly half of the market share in Pakistan.

He also serves as the Chief Executive of Punjab Seed Corporation for Short term in late 90s, which produces seeds for cotton, wheat, and rice..

He was one of the founders of the Pakistan Crop Protection Association (PCPA) and served two terms as its National Chairman, notably from 1996 to 1997. Association of Pesticide Market.

In Punjab Civil Service,his final posting as DG-M (Research Projects) based at the University of Arid Agriculture, Rawalpindi.

== Political Life ==
Mansha has significant political influence in South Punjab. Before his election to the Assembly. He also served as a Member (Pesticides) and chief coordinator of the Chief Minister's Task Force on Agriculture during the 1st administration of Shehbaz Sharif.

Mansha was enrolled at the University of Agriculture, Faisalabad (then the West Pakistan University of Agriculture) from 1968 to 1974. During his time there, he won the Student Union election in 1969. Supported by Right-wing politics Student Groups

He also won the District Council election from Sahiwal District in 1998.

He won a seat in the Provincial Assembly of the Punjab in the 2002 elections for the constituency PP-186 (Sahiwal)

In the 2002 elections,He contested for the provincial seat as part of the Pakistan Muslim League (N) panel alongside Syed Imran Ahmed Shah. and Malik Nadeem Kamran.
