= Rana Zahid Hussain =

Pakistani politician

- رانا زاہد حسین

Member of the National Assembly of Pakistan
- In office 2008 – 31 May 2018
- Constituency: NA-166 (Pakpattan-III)

Personal details
- Born: 16 October 1954 Sahiwal, Pakistan
- Died: 30 August 2022 (aged 67)
- Party: Pakistan Muslim League (N)
- Children: Rana Iradat Sharif Khan

Rana Zahid Hussain Khan (Urdu: رانا زاہد حسین خان; 16 October 1954 – 30 August 2022) was a Pakistani politician who served as a member of the National Assembly of Pakistan from 2008 to May 2018.

== Early life and education ==
He was born on 16 October 1954 in Sahiwal.

He submitted two graduation degrees to the Election Commission of Pakistan, one from the University of the Punjab and the other of the University of Balochistan. The authenticity of both degree was challenged in the Lahore High Court. He was also accused of tampering with his Intermediate certificate.

== Political career ==
He ran for the seat of the National Assembly of Pakistan as a candidate of Pakistan Muslim League (N) (PML-N) from Constituency NA-166 (Pakpattan-III) in the 2002 Pakistani general election but was unsuccessful. He received 56,712 votes and lost the seat to Junaid Mumtaz Joya, a candidate of Pakistan Muslim League (Q) (PML-Q).

He was elected to the National Assembly as a candidate of PML-N from Constituency NA-166 (Pakpattan-III) in the 2008 Pakistani general election. He received 66,418 votes and defeated Junaid Mumtaz Joya, a candidate of PML-Q.

In December 2010, a court issued non-bailable arrest warrant for Hussain in an alleged fraud and forgery case with a local farmer.

He was re-elected to the National Assembly as a candidate of PML-N from Constituency NA-166 (Pakpattan-III) in the 2013 Pakistani general election. He received 87,209 votes and defeated Mian Muhammad Amjad Joyia, a candidate of Pakistan Tehreek-e-Insaf (PTI).

In June 2018, he was allocated PML-N ticket to contest the 2018 general election from Constituency NA-146 (Pakpattan-II). However he was disqualified by the Lahore High Court to contest the election for life after a case was filed against him for possessing fake degree.

== Personal life ==
Hussain's son, Rana Iradat Sharif Khan, is also a member of the National Assembly who succeeded him in his constituency following his death.
