= Iqbal Tikka =

Pakistani politician (died 2021)

Iqbal Tikka اِقبال ٹِکّا
- Constituency: Arifwala

Personal details
- Citizenship: Pakistani
- Party: Pakistan People’s Party
- Children: Hammad Tikka

Tikka Muhammad Iqbal Khan (Urdu/Punjabi: اِقبال ٹِکّا) was a Pakistani politician who served as a member of the Provincial Assembly of the Punjab. He died of a heart attack on 1 March 2021.

== Political career ==
Tikka was nominated by the former President of Pakistan, General Pervez Musharraf to replace Lieutenant General (retd) Khalid Maqbool as the Governor of Punjab but the scheduled replacement was postponed due to suicide attacks on the president's convoy on 25 December 2003. Later in December 2007, Tikka in a surprising turn of events filed a petition in the Supreme Court of Pakistan against 3 November 2007 actions of General Pervez Musharraf that had come in the form of a Provisional Constitutional Order (PCO). He claimed that the army chief had no legal authority to impose an emergency in the country or suspend the constitution, stating that the imposition of a national emergency was the president's prerogative. A judgement was given against it thus rendering a quasi-legal validation to the PCO.

Tikka also held a very close association with the former Prime Minister Benazir Bhutto and was appointed Provincial Minister in Punjab in the 1988 government of the Pakistan Peoples Party (PPP) and Senior Federal Minister in its 1993 government. Earlier he served Benazir Bhutto's father, former Prime Minister Zulfikar Ali Bhutto as his personal advisor with the status of a senior minister in the 1971 and 1977 governments of the PPP.

Tikka contested in the 1988 general election as an Islami Jamhoori Ittehad candidate from PP-190 (Sahiwal). He received 26,392 votes and defeated Muhammad Nazir, a PPP candidate.
