= PP-189 Okara-V =

Constituency of the Provincial Assembly of Punjab, Pakistan

- Constituency for the Provincial Assembly of Punjab
- Region: Depalpur Tehsil (partly) including Dipalpur city of Okara District

Current constituency
- Created from: PP-192 Okara-VIII (2002-2018); PP-187 Okara-V (2018-2023)

PP-189 Okara-V (پی پی-189، اوكاڑا-5) is a Constituency of Provincial Assembly of Punjab.

== General elections 2024 ==
Provincial election 2024: PP-189 Okara-V
Party	Candidate	Votes	%	±%
PML(N)	Ali Abbas	40,499	31.63	
Independent	Chaudhry Tariq Irshad Khan (Note: Filed nomination papers as PTI candidate but ECP allowed him to run as an Independent)	38,331	29.93	
Independent	Rao Saad Ajmal	30,142	23.54	
Independent	Muhammad Mustafa	9,077	7.09	
TLP	Muhammad Ahmad	5,965	4.66	
Others	Others (thirteen candidates)	4,037	3.15	
Turnout		132,669	53.71	
Total valid votes		128,051	96.52	
Rejected ballots		4,618	3.48	
Majority		2,168	1.70	
Registered electors		247,013		
hold				

== General elections 2018 ==
Provincial election 2018: PP-187 Okara-V
Party	Candidate	Votes	%	±%
PML(N)	Ali Abbas	44,524	38.38	
PTI	Chaudhary Tariq Irshad Khan	37,013	31.90	
Independent	Bilal Umar Bodla	20,488	17.66	
TLP	Mian Sajjad Ahmad Khan Wattoo	4,896	4.22	
Independent	Mahmood Haider	4,780	4.12	
MMA	Muhammad Rafi	1,787	1.54	
Others	Others (nine candidates)	2,533	2.18	
Turnout		119,225	57.87	
Total valid votes		116,021	97.31	
Rejected ballots		3,204	2.69	
Majority		7,511	6.48	
Registered electors		206,015		

== General elections 2013 ==
Provincial election 2013: PP-192 Okara-VIII
Party	Candidate	Votes	%	±%
PML(N)	Ali Abbas	42,073	46.04	
PTI	Ch. Tariq Irshad Khan	18,893	20.68	
PPP	Syed Abbas Raza Rizwi	9,364	10.25	
TTP	Mian Sana Ullah Dolla	9,294	10.17	
PML(Q)	Sardar Sheharyar Moakkal	7,131	7.80	
Independent	Ch. Ahmad Nawaz Khan	2,088	2.28	
JI	Mian Muhammad Rafi Sukhera	1,506	1.65	
Others	Others (ten candidates)	1,031	1.13	
Turnout		94,877	61.07	
Total valid votes		91,380	96.31	
Rejected ballots		3,497	3.69	
Majority		23,180	25.36	
Registered electors		155,368		

== General elections 2008 ==
Contesting candidates	Party affiliation	Votes polled

== See also ==
- PP-188 Okara-IV
- PP-190 Okara-VI
