= PP-192 Okara-VIII =

Constituency of the Provincial Assembly of Punjab, Pakistan

- Constituency for the Provincial Assembly of Punjab
- Region: Okara Tehsil (partly) including Gogera town of Okara District

Current constituency
- Created from: PP-189 Okara-V (2002-2018); PP-190 Okara-VIII (2018-2023)

PP-192 Okara-VIII (پی پی-192، اوكاڑا-8) is a Constituency of Provincial Assembly of Punjab.

== General elections 2024 ==
Provincial election 2024: PP-192 Okara-VIII
Party	Candidate	Votes	%	±%
PML(N)	Ghulam Raza	64,220	43.62	
Independent	Hammad Aslam (Note: Filed nomination papers as PTI candidate but ECP allowed him to run as an Independent)	57,373	38.97	
TLP	Muhammad Shan	10,072	6.84	
PPP	Ayyaz UI Kareem	6,788	4.61	
Independent	Rai Ali Noor Kharal	2,608	1.77	
JI	Rab Nawaz Saqib	2,184	1.48	
Others	Others (ten candidates)	3,982	2.71	
Turnout		151,530	58.02	
Total valid votes		147,227	97.16	
Rejected ballots		4,303	2.84	
Majority		6,847	4.65	
Registered electors		261,184		
hold				

== General elections 2018 ==
Provincial election 2018: PP-190 Okara-VIII
Party	Candidate	Votes	%	±%
PML(N)	Ghulam Raza	42,164	31.08	
PTI	Hamad Aslam	41,241	30.40	
Independent	Rai Ali Noor Kharl	19,915	14.68	
Independent	Muhammad Akbar Chaudhary	7,001	5.16	
MMA	Liaqat Ali	5,889	4.34	
Independent	Habib Ullah	4,953	3.65	
PPP	Rai Faisal Abbas	4,586	3.38	
TLP	Muhammad Yousaf	4,126	3.04	
Independent	Mazhar Farid Sial	2,070	1.53	
Independent	Saeed Ur Rahman	2,066	1.52	
Others	Others (four candidates)	1,650	1.22	
Turnout		141,319	60.86	
Total valid votes		135,616	96.00	
Rejected ballots		5,658	4.00	
Majority		923	0.68	
Registered electors		232,224		

== General elections 2013 ==
Provincial election 2013: PP-189 Okara-V
Party	Candidate	Votes	%	±%
PTI	Masood Shafqat	38,787	42.87	
PML(N)	Ch Ghulam Raza Rebera	37,421	41.36	
APML	Rai Faisal Abbas	5,028	5.56	
PPP	Mian Asghar Jeway Khan	3,984	4.40	
Independent	Rai Ayaz Ul Kareem	2,323	2.57	
Others	Others (eleven candidates)	2,941	3.25	
Turnout		94,989	60.34	
Total valid votes		90,484	95.26	
Rejected ballots		4,505	4.74	
Majority		1,366	1.51	
Registered electors		157,415		

== General elections 2008 ==
Contesting candidates	Party affiliation	Votes polled

== See also ==
- PP-191 Okara-VII
- PP-193 Pakpattan-I
