= NA-137 Okara-III =

Constituency of the National Assembly of Pakistan

- Constituency for the National Assembly of Pakistan
- Region: Depalpur Tehsil (partly) including Dipalpur City and Renala Khurd Tehsil (partly) of Okara District
- Electorate: 529,049

Current constituency
- Party: Sunni Ittehad Council
- Member: Syed Raza Ali Gillani

NA-137 Okara-III (این اے-137، اوكاڑه-3) is a constituency for the National Assembly of Pakistan.

== Members of Parliament ==
=== 2018–2023: NA-143 Okara-III ===
Election	Member	Party
2018	Rao Muhammad Ajmal Khan	PML (N)

=== 2024–present: NA-137 Okara-III ===
Election	Member	Party
2024	Syed Raza Ali Gillani	SIC

== Election 2002 ==
General elections were held on 10 October 2002. Rao Muhammad Ajmal Khan an independent candidate won by 62,711 votes.

General election 2002: NA-146 Okara-IV
Party	Candidate	Votes	%	±%
Independent	Rao Muhammad Ajmal Khan	62,711	56.35	
PML(Q)	Rao Muhammad Safdar Khan	48,587	43.65	
Turnout		115,931	46.58	
Total valid votes		111,298	96.00	
Rejected ballots		4,633	4.00	
Majority		14,124	12.70	
Registered electors		248,891		

== Election 2008 ==
General elections were held on 18 February 2008. Mian Manzoor Ahmad Khan Wattoo an independent candidate won by 46,941 votes.

General election 2008: NA-146 Okara-IV
Party	Candidate	Votes	%	±%
Independent	Mian Manzoor Ahmad Khan Wattoo	46,941	35.05	
PML(Q)	Rao Muhammad Ajmal Khan	46,006	34.36	
PPP	Syed Abbas Raza Rizvi	29,709	22.19	
PML(N)	Mian Muhammad Sharif Zafar Joia	8,544	6.38	
Others	Others (six candidates)	2,715	2.02	
Turnout		139,601	44.75	
Total valid votes		133,915	95.93	
Rejected ballots		5,686	4.07	
Majority		935	0.69	
Registered electors		311,975		
independent politician hold				

== Election 2013 ==
General elections were held on 11 May 2013. Rao Muhammad Ajmal Khan of PML-N won by 109,998 votes and became the member of National Assembly.

General election 2013: NA-146 Okara-IV
Party	Candidate	Votes	%	±%
PML(N)	Rao Muhammad Ajmal Khan	109,998	67.24	
PPP	Mian Manzoor Ahmad Khan Wattoo	27,401	16.75	
PTI	Abdur Raoof Dolla	11,999	7.34	
Others	Others (twelve candidates)	14,185	8.67	
Turnout		169,493	60.88	
Total valid votes		163,583	96.51	
Rejected ballots		5,910	3.49	
Majority		82,597	50.49	
Registered electors		278,408		
PML(N) gain from independent politician				

== Election 2018 ==
General elections were held on 25 July 2018.

General election 2018: NA-143 Okara-III
Party	Candidate	Votes	%	±%
PML(N)	Rao Muhammad Ajmal Khan	142,988	58.06	
PTI	Syed Gulzar Sibtain Shah	89,177	36.21	
Others	Others (twelve candidates)	14,107	5.73	
Turnout		252,198	58.22	
Total valid votes		246,272	97.65	
Rejected ballots		5,926	2.35	
Majority		53,811	21.85	
Registered electors		433,216		
PML(N) hold		Swing	N/A	

== Election 2024 ==
General elections were held on 8 February 2024. Syed Raza Ali Gillani won the election with 132,067 votes.

General election 2024: NA-137 Okara-III
Party	Candidate	Votes	%	±%
PTI	Syed Raza Ali Gillani (Note: Filed nomination papers as PTI candidate but ECP allowed him to run as an independent)	132,067	46.89	▲10.68
PML(N)	Rao Muhammad Ajmal Khan	105,470	37.45	▼20.61
Others	Others (thirty-two candidates)	44,088	15.65	
Turnout		289,898	54.80	▼3.42
Total valid votes		281,625	97.15	
Rejected ballots		8,273	2.85	
Majority		26,597	9.44	
Registered electors		529,049		

== See also ==
- NA-136 Okara-II
- NA-138 Okara-IV
