= PP-199 Sahiwal-II =

Constituency of the Punjabi Provincial Legislature, Pakistan

- Constituency for the Provincial Assembly of Punjab
- Region: Sahiwal Tehsil (partly) including Sahiwal city northern of Sahiwal District

Current constituency
- Created from: PP-221 Sahiwal-II (2002-2018); PP-197 Sahiwal-II (2018-2023)

PP-199 Sahiwal-II (پی پی-199، ساہيوال-2) is a constituency of Provincial Assembly of Punjab.

== General elections 2024 ==
Provincial election 2024: PP-199 Sahiwal-II
Party	Candidate	Votes	%	±%
PML(N)	Qasim Nadeem	46,262	41.43	
Independent	Ahmed Safdar Khan (Note: Filed nomination papers as PTI candidate but ECP allowed him to run as an Independent)	43,138	38.63	
PPP	Sarmad Shafqat	8,866	7.94	
JI	Tayyab Mahmood Ashraf	5,118	4.58	
TLP	Hafiz Zar Bakht Riaz	4,941	4.42	
Others	Others (seventeen candidates)	3,352	3.00	
Turnout		113,809	47.05	
Total valid votes		111,677	98.13	
Rejected ballots		2,132	1.87	
Majority		3,124	2.80	
Registered electors		241,888		
hold				

== General elections 2018 ==
Provincial election 2018: PP-197 Sahiwal-II
Party	Candidate	Votes	%	±%
PML(N)	Malik Nadeem Kamran	63,252	52.03	
PTI	Sheikh Muhammad	40,970	33.70	
PPP	Sarmad Shafqat	7,726	6.36	
TLP	Shahzad Mahmood Khan	5,264	4.33	
MMA	Muhammad Ikram Ul Haq	2,227	1.83	
Others	Others (six candidates)	2,126	1.76	
Turnout		123,262	54.75	
Total valid votes		121,565	98.62	
Rejected ballots		1,697	1.38	
Majority		22,282	18.33	
Registered electors		225,148		

== General elections 2013 ==
Provincial election 2013: PP-221 Sahiwal-II
Party	Candidate	Votes	%	±%
PML(N)	Malik Nadeem Kamran	55,462	50.30	
PTI	Sheikh Muhammad Chohan	27,830	25.24	
JI	Sheikh Shahid Hameed	13,616	12.35	
PPP	Aftab Ahmad Khan	9,848	8.93	
Independent	Sohail Iqbal	1,844	1.67	
Others	Others (fifteen candidates)	1,662	1.51	
Turnout		112,375	58.96	
Total valid votes		110,262	98.12	
Rejected ballots		2,113	1.88	
Majority		27,632	25.06	
Registered electors		190,599		

== See also ==
- PP-198 Sahiwal-I
- PP-200 Sahiwal-III
