= Nouraiz Shakoor =

Pakistani politician

Nouraiz Asghar

Member of the National Assembly of Pakistan
- In office October 2002 – October 2007
- Constituency: NA 147- Sahiwal-II

Personal details
- Party: IPP (2023-present)
- Other political affiliations: PTI (2014–2022); PML(Q) (2002–2014); PMLN (1997–2002); PPP (1988–1997)

Chaudhary Nouraiz Shakoor Khan (Urdu, Punjabi: نوریز شکور) (born October 19, 1948) is a Pakistani politician from Sahiwal who has been a member of the Pakistan National Assembly three times in 1988, 1993 and 2002 elections respectively.

He was part of Zafarullah Khan Jamali Cabinet, As a Federal Minister of Petroleum.

His reputation among the public was as an arrogant man. Who strongly believe in So called Rajput Cast System.

Shakoor was a member of the Pakistan Peoples Party (PPP) and then Pakistan Tehreek e Insaf PTI. Presently he is CEC Member of PTI. He has served in various Ministerial positions, including Minister for Petroleum and Natural Resources, Minister for Science and Technology, Minister for Communications, Minister of State for Youth Affairs and Parliamentary Secretary for Communications. He has also served as a Member of the National Assembly Standing Committees on Kashmir Affairs, Finance, Planning and Production. He joined the Pakistan Tehreek-e-Insaf in 2011. After 9 May, He left PTI and Join Aleem Khan Party.

From 1993 to 1996, he was Parliamentary Secretary for Communications. Later he became Minister of Communications and Youth Affairs (Pakistan). From 2002 to 2004, he was the Minister of Petroleum and Natural Affairs (Pakistan). From 2004 to 2007 he was the Minister of Science and Technology (Pakistan). As a representative of the government of Pakistan, Khan has made a number of official tours across Europe, Asia and the United States.

He is the incumbent president of the Pakistan Cycling Federation.

== Background ==
Nouraiz Was Son of Ch Abdul Shakoor, Who was a Medium scale Land Owner. Ch Abdul Shakoor Elected a Chairman District Board of Montgomery (Now the Sahiwal District) in 1950s and Also MPA on Ticket of Pakistan People's Party in 1977 But lose in recounting in same week.Living in Sahiwal City.

According to his family sources, his grandfather Ch Saad was Associated with Darbar of the Raja of Kapurthala State in British Raj.

Nouraiz Shakoor Khan graduated from the Cadet College Petaro in 1968 after finishing intermediate education, At the Same Time Asif Ali Zardari & Zulfiqar Mirzaalso in Petaro.He later completed a Bachelor of Laws and became a practicing lawyer.

Shakoor contested all member National Assembly Elections from 1985 to 2018 on the PPP ticket, except 1985 (independent), 2008(PML-Q) and 2018 (PTI). Of nine elections, he was able to win three.

His reputation among the public was as an arrogant man. Who strongly believe in So called Rajput Cast System.

In 2002 Nouraiz formed the Pakistan Peoples Party Parliamentarians Patriots (PPPPP) and became the Senior Vice President of the party. PPPPP merged with the ruling Pakistan Muslim League(PML-Q) and he became senior member of the ruling PML-Q. He contested the 2008 elections on the PML-Q ticket and lost. He joined PTI in 2011 and contested the 2018 election on PTI ticket.

Shakoor has served as Parliamentary Secretary for Communications in 1993–95 and as the Federal Minister of State for Communications and Youth Affairs in 1995–97. He then held the office of the Federal Minister for Petroleum and Natural Resources from 2002 to 2004. From 2005 to 2007, he held the portfolio of Minister of Science and Technology.

He was also a member of the Standing Committee on Finance Economics Affairs in 1988–90 and 1993–96, Standing Committee on Production 1988–90, Standing Committee on Planning and Development and Parliamentary Kashmir Committee 1993–96. Being on these titles Nouraiz Shakoor attended many national and international Conferences, Workshops and Seminars as part and leader of the delegations. He has represented Pakistan on many official tours around the World and has visited regions within U.S.A, Europe and Asia.
