= PP-191 Okara-VII =

Constituency of the Provincial Assembly of Punjab, Pakistan

- Constituency for the Provincial Assembly of Punjab
- Region: Okara city (partly) of Okara District

Current constituency
- Created from: PP-190 Okara-VI (2002-2018); PP-189 Okara-VII (2018-2023)

PP-191 Okara-VII (پی پی-191، اوكاڑا-7) is a Constituency of Provincial Assembly of Punjab.

== General elections 2024 ==
Provincial election 2024: PP-191 Okara-VII
Party	Candidate	Votes	%	±%
PML(N)	Mian Muhammad Munir	46,256	34.89	
Independent	Muhammad Saleem Sadiq (Note: Filed nomination papers as PTI candidate but ECP allowed him to run as an Independent)	44,995	33.94	
Independent	Abdur Rehman	18,202	13.73	
TLP	Muhammad Arif	7,895	5.96	
PPP	Sajjad UI Hassan	7,699	5.81	
JI	Muhammad Afzal Awan	2,439	1.84	
Others	Others (twenty six candidates)	5,095	3.83	
Turnout		135,787	48.94	
Total valid votes		132,581	97.64	
Rejected ballots		3,206	2.36	
Majority		1,261	0.95	
Registered electors		277,460		
hold				

== General elections 2018 ==
Provincial election 2018: PP-189 Okara-VII
Party	Candidate	Votes	%	±%
PML(N)	Muneeb UI Haq	69,561	57.45	
PTI	Muhammad Saleem	40,580	33.52	
TLP	Maqsood Ahmad	6,358	5.25	
PPP	Muhammad Rafique Sajid	2,534	2.09	
Others	Others (eleven candidates)	2,043	1.69	
Turnout		122,837	53.72	
Total valid votes		121,076	98.57	
Rejected ballots		1,761	1.43	
Majority		28,981	23.93	
Registered electors		228,680		

== General elections 2013 ==
Provincial election 2013: PP-190 Okara-VI
Party	Candidate	Votes	%	±%
PML(N)	Main Muhammad Munir	63,366	61.62	
PPP	Muhammad Ashraf Khan Sohna	17,701	17.21	
PTI	Azhar Mahmood Chaudhary	16,362	15.91	
Independent	Rao Mazhar Elahi Khan	1,142	1.11	
JI	Muhammad Farooq Sheikh	1,127	1.10	
Others	Others (twenty nine candidates)	3,134	3.05	
Turnout		104,601	55.74	
Total valid votes		102,832	98.31	
Rejected ballots		1,769	1.69	
Majority		45,665	44.41	
Registered electors		187,674		

== General elections 2008 ==
Contesting candidates	Party affiliation	Votes polled

== See also ==
- PP-190 Okara-VI
- PP-192 Okara-VIII
