= Arif Wala =

City in Punjab, Pakistan

Ārifwāla عارفوالا
- City
- Location within Punjab, Pakistan Location within Pakistan
- Coordinates: 30°17′53″N 73°3′22″E
- Country: Pakistan
- Province: Punjab
- Division: Sahiwal
- District: Pakpattan
- Tehsil: Arifwala

Government
  - Type: Municipal Committee
  - Administrator: Sobia Falak Rao
  - Chief Officer: None (Vacant)

Population (2023 Census)
  - City: 157,063
  - Rank: 70th in Pakistan
- Time zone: UTC+5 (PST)
- Calling code: 0457

Ārifwāla (Punjabi and Urdu: عارفوالا) is a city and headquarters of Arif Wala Tehsil of Pakpattan District in the Punjab province of Pakistan.

It is the 70th most populous city in Pakistan. Arifwala is located to the southwest of Pakpattan.

== Demographics ==
Population

Historical population
Year	Pop.	±% p.a.
1951	11,537	—
1961	18,558	+4.87%
1972	28,171	+3.87%
1981	43,654	+4.99%
1998	74,174	+3.17%
2017	111,403	+2.16%
2023	157,063	+5.89%

According to 2023 census, Arifwala had a population of 157,063. The population of city in 1998 was 74,174 but according to the 2017 Census of Pakistan, the population has risen to 111,403 with a growth of about 50.19% in 19 years.

Languages

Languages of Arif wala MC (2023 Census)
1. Punjabi (96.5%)
2. Urdu (3.00%)
3. Others (0.50%)

== Road projects ==
The Provincial Development Working Party approved a scheme to rehabilitate a 17 km stretch of road from Bahawalnagar to Arifwala for Rs631.246 million in its 7th meeting. The PDWP, chaired by Abdullah Khan Sumbal, also approved seven other road schemes worth a total of Rs9 billion.
