= Pakpattan Tehsil =

تحصِيل پاکپتّن
- Tehsil
- Pakpattan Tehsil
- Location of Pakpattan Tehsil in Punjab, Pakistan

Pakpattan Tehsil (Urdu: تحصِيل پاکپتّن), is an administrative subdivision (tehsil) of Pakpattan District in the Punjab province of Pakistan. The city of Pakpattan is the headquarters of the tehsil which is administratively subdivided into five Union Councils.

== Administration ==
The tehsil of Pakpattan is administratively subdivided into 33 Union Councils, these are:

- Chak No. 15/KB
- Chak No. 32/SP
- Chak No. 30/SP
- Chak No. 37/SP
- Chak No. 85/D
- Chak No. 93/D
- Chak No. 96/D
- Chak No. 26/SP
- Chak No. 11/SP
- Chak No. 15/SP
- Chak No. 17/SP
- Behrampur
- Bunga Hayat
- Boyal Ganj
- Chak Bedi
- Chak Sanday Khan
- Dhappai
- Dhawana
- Firozpur Chishtian
- Halla Wattuan
- Taber
- Hota
- Jagga Baloch
- Kalyana
- Kimbariwala
- Malka Hans
- Musewal
- Pakka Sidhar
- Pakpattan-I
- Pakpattan-II
- Pakpattan-III
- Pakpattan-IV
- Pakpattan-V
- Peer Ghani
- Tiwana Kalan

== Educational Institutes ==
- The Oxford College

Katchehry Road, Pakpattan.

Premier Public High School, Pakpattan

- Pakpattan Public School inaugurated by Dr. Allah Bakhsh Malik former Deputy Commissioner Pakpattan Sharif.
- Cambridge College Pakpattan Boys Campus 37/sp Road, Girls Campus Bassi sharif road Pakpattan. (0300-6940399) Head of Comp Sci. Dept. (department consist of just ics with 5or6 students) Rana Naveed (0301-7252377)
- Govt Faridia Postgraduate College Pakpattan
- Punjab College
- Superior College
- Leads College
- Forsight College
- Laureate College In front of Govt. Faridia College Pakpattan (0300-6940676)
