= Arif Wala Tehsil =

Tehsil subdivision in Punjab, Pakistan

Ārifwāla عارِف والا
- Tehsil
- Location of Arif Wala Tehsil in Punjab, Pakistan
- Coordinates: 30°17′53″N 73°3′22″E
- Country: Pakistan
- Province: Punjab
- Division: Sahiwal
- District: Pakpattan

Area
  - Total: 1,195 km^{2} (461 sq mi)

Population (2017 Census of Pakistan)
  - Total: 854,462
  - Density: 715.0/km^{2} (1,852/sq mi)
- Time zone: UTC+5 (PST)
- Calling code: 0457

Ārifwāla (Punjabi: عارفوالا) is a tehsil of Pakpattan District in the Punjab province of Pakistan.

== Administration ==
The tehsil of Arifwala is administratively subdivided into 30 Union Councils.

- Urban 1 N Block
- Urban 2
- Urban 3
- Urban 4
- Chak No. 59/EB
- Chak No. 151/EB
- Chak No. 34/EB
- Chak No. 50/SP
- Chak Shafi/Kot Heera Singh
- Chak Jeewan Shah
- Chak No. 13/EB
- Chak No. 75/EB Qaboola Road
- Chak No. 69/EB
- Qaboola
- Pir Saddar Din
- Noora Ruth
- Tibbi Lal Baig
- Chak No. 18/KB
- Jamun Bodla
- Baili Dilawar
- Chak Mehdi Kha'an
- Chak No. 163/EB
- Chak No. 147/EB
- Chak No. 351/EB
- Chak No. 86/EB
- Chak No. 66/EB
- Chak No. 68/EB
- Chak No. 70/EB
- Chak No. 74/EB
- Chak No. 76/EB
- Chak No. 78/EB
- Chak No. 72/EB
- Chak No. 80/EB
- Chak No. 66/EB
- Chak No. 48/EB
- Chak No. 82/EB
- Chak No. 84/EB
- Chak No. 86/EB
- Chak No. 88/EB
- Chak No. 92/EB
- Chak No. 90/EB
- Chak No. 94/EB
- Chak No. 96/EB
- Chak No. 83/EB
- Chak No. 109/EB
- Chak No. 93eb
- Chak Moeen Kot

== Demography ==
Most of the population are farmers; about 75% of the population live in villages and only 25% live in the municipal urban area. But the trend is shifting with the increase of industrialization in the premises of Arifwala and people are moving to the urban area. Arifwala Tehsil covers an area of 295,146 acres (1195 km^{2}) with a population of about 720,000. The urban area covers 457 acres (1.85 km^{2}) and the agriculture area covers 1274 acres (3.18 km^{2}). Punjabi is the native spoken language, but Urdu is also widely used.
