= Pakpattan District =

District in Punjab, Pakistan

Coordinates: 30°18′N 73°16′E

Pakpattan District ضلع پاکپتّن
- District of Punjab
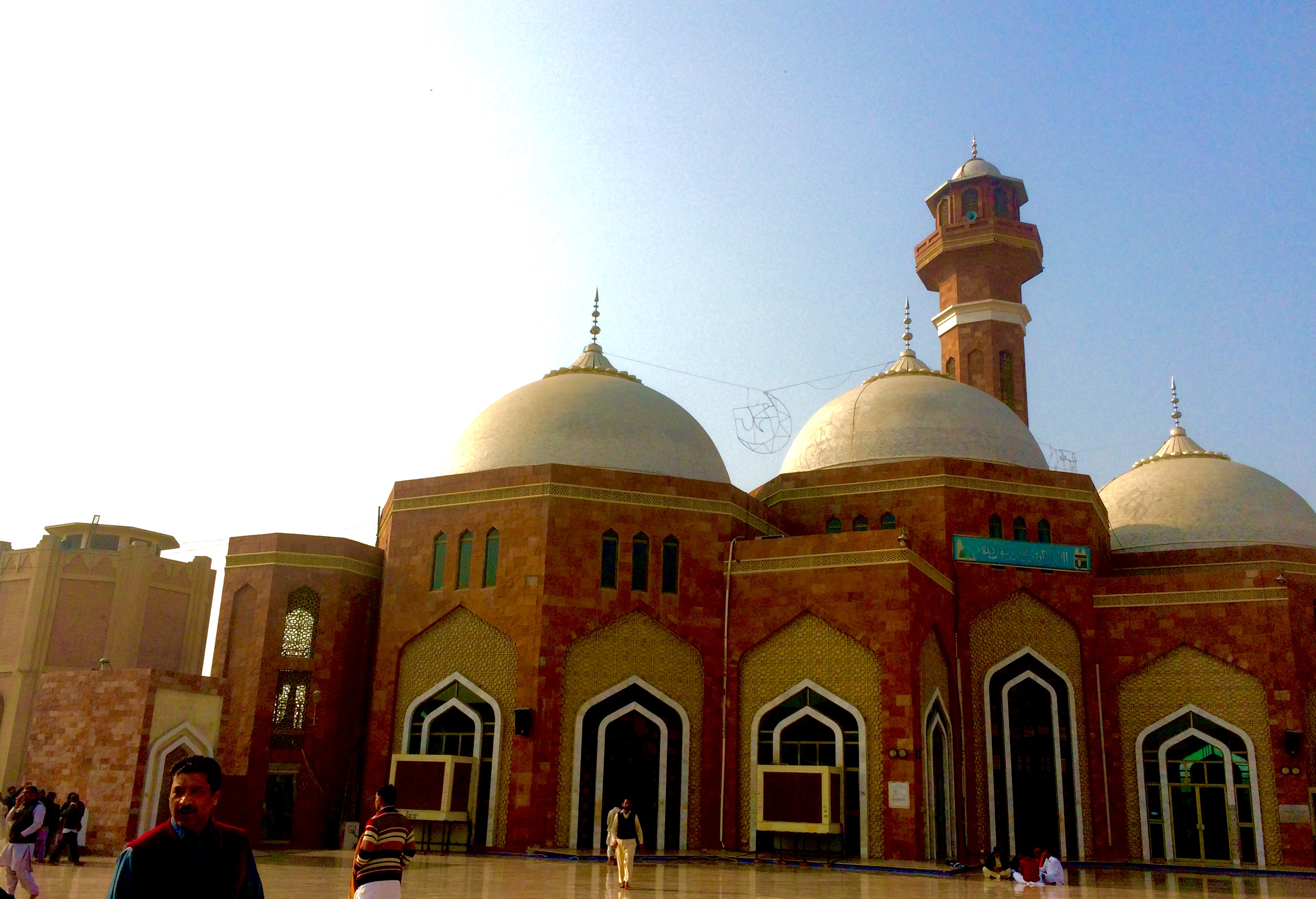
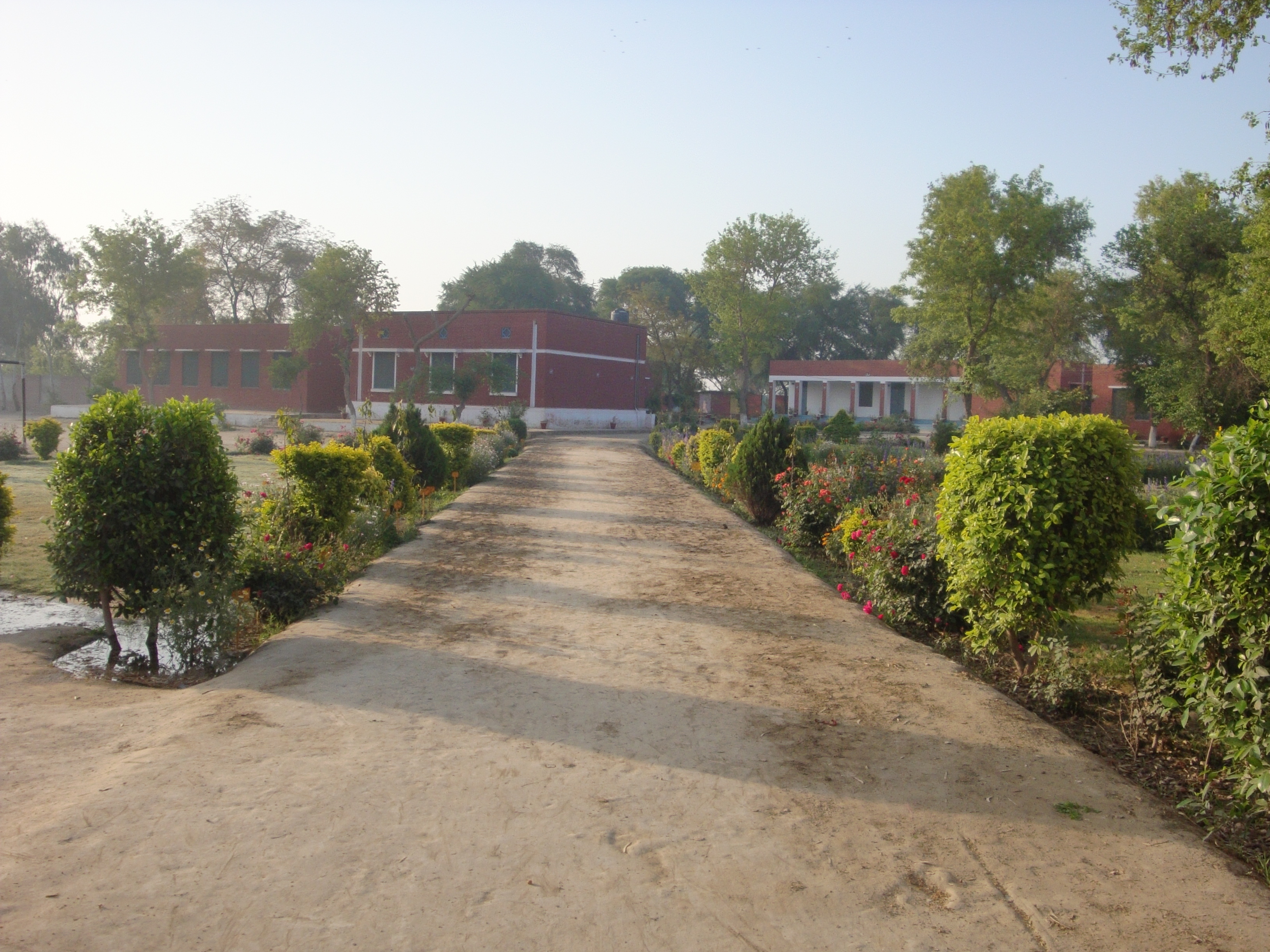
- Top: Mosque at shrine of Fariduddin Ganjshakar; Bottom: Tibbi Lal Baig

- Location of Pakpattan in Punjab.
- Country: Pakistan
- Province: Punjab
- Division: Sahiwal
- Headquarters: Pakpattan

Government
  - Type: District Administration
  - Deputy Commissioner: Asif Raza (PML-N)
  - MNA: Ahmad Raza Maneka
  - MPA: Chaudhry Javed Ahmad

Area
  - District of Punjab: 2,724 km^{2} (1,052 sq mi)

Population (2023)
  - District of Punjab: 2,136,170
  - Density: 784.2/km^{2} (2,031/sq mi)
  - Urban: 472,575
  - Rural: 1,663,595

Literacy
  - Literacy rate: Total: (57.13%); Male: (64.70%); Female: (49.27%)
- Time zone: UTC+5 (PST)
- Area code: 0457
- Number of Tehsils: 2
- Website: pakpattan.punjab.gov.pk

Pakpattan District (Punjabi and Punjabi: ضلع پاکپتّن), is a district of Punjab province in Pakistan, Pakpattan city is the district capital.

== Administrative division ==
The district is divided into two tehsils, which contain a total of 63 Union Councils:

Tehsil	Area (km^{2})	Pop. (2023)	Density (ppl/km^{2}) (2023)	Literacy rate (2023)	Union Councils
Arifwala	1,641	999,278	805.22	58.24%	33
Pakpattan	1,483	1,136,892	766.62	56.11%	30

== Location ==
The capital Pakpattan is located about 179 km from Lahore and 205 km from Multan. The district is bounded to the northwest by Sahiwal District, to the north by Okara District, to the southeast by the Sutlej River and Bahawalnagar District, and to the southwest by Vehari District.

== Demographics ==
Historical population
Year	Pop.	±% p.a.
1951	380,678	—
1961	440,091	+1.46%
1972	615,742	+3.10%
1981	843,623	+3.56%
1998	1,286,680	+2.51%
2017	1,824,228	+1.85%
2023	2,136,170	+2.67%

As of the 2023 census, Pakpattan district has 344,546 households and a population of 2,136,170. The district has a sex ratio of 103.30 males to 100 females and a literacy rate of 57.13%: 64.70% for males and 49.27% for females. 613,557 (28.73% of the surveyed population) are under 10 years of age. 472,575 (22.12%) live in urban areas.

Religion in Pakpattan district (2023)
Religion	Percent
Islam	99.49%
Christianity	0.50%
Other or not stated	0.01%

Religion in contemporary Pakpattan District
Religious group	1941		2017		2023	
Religious group	Pop.	%	Pop.	%	Pop.	%
Islam	214,966	64.46%	1,818,324	99.68%	2,124,641	99.49%
Hinduism (Note: 1941 census: Including Ad-Dharmis)	61,197	18.35%	97	0.01%	61	0%
Sikhism	54,047	16.21%	—N/a	—N/a	22	0%
Christianity	3,234	0.97%	5,741	0.31%	10,655	0.5%
Ahmadi	—N/a	—N/a	58	0%	51	0%
Others (Note: Including Jainism, Buddhism, Zoroastrianism, Judaism, or not stated)	31	0.01%	8	0%	81	0%
Total Population	333,475	100%	1,824,228	100%	2,135,511	100%
Note: 1941 census data is for Pakpattan tehsil of the former Montgomery District, which roughly corresponds to contemporary Pakpattan district. District and tehsil borders have changed since 1941.

== Languges ==
Languages of Pakpattan district (2023)
1. Punjabi (95.4%)
2. Urdu (3.50%)
3. Others (1.08%)

At the time of the 2023 census, 95.42% of the population spoke Punjabi and 3.50% Urdu as their first language.

According to the 1998 census, the predominant first language is Punjabi, spoken by 95.9% of the population, followed by Urdu with 3.7%.Haryanvi, also called Rangari, is spoken among Ranghar, Rajput.

== Etymology ==
Pakpattan was originally known as Ajodhan (Hindi: अजोधन) until the 16th century. Ajodhan may be a Sanskrit term that can be interpreted as "eternal wealth" or "eternal prosperity," with Aja meaning "unborn" or "eternal" and Dhana meaning "wealth" or "prosperity." It is believed that the name of the city has changed over time, and anecdotally, it may have been known by various names prior to being called Ajodhan.

Pakpattan derives its current name from the combination of two Punjabi words: Pak, meaning "pure," and Pattan, meaning "dock"; this name references a ferry service across the Sutlej River, frequented by pilgrims visiting the Shrine of Baba Farid. The ferry symbolized a metaphorical journey of salvation, with the saint’s spirit guiding believers across the river.

During the Delhi Sultanate and Mughal eras, including the reigns of Akbar and Aurangzeb, the city continued to be known as Ajodhan. However, as the shrine of Baba Farid grew in significance, the name "Pakpattan" gained popular use and eventually eclipsed the older name. Akbar’s Ain-i-Akbari mentions the region, indicating that both names—Ajodhan and Pakpattan—were likely used interchangeably in local and administrative records.

== Education ==
Notable educational institutes in the city include:

- Government Faridia Degree College Pakpattan
- Ibadat International University Pakpattan Campus
- Virtual University Pakpattan Campus
- Punjab College Pakpattan Campus
- Superior College Pakpattan Campus
- Cambridge College Pakpattan
- Abaid Ullah Group Of Colleges

== Notable personalities ==
- Rana Iradat Sharif Khan
- Iqbal Tikka
- Hamid Rana
- Azhar Rangeela

== Villages ==
- Chak Shafi
- Chak Kalyana
- Chak Bodla
- Chak 16/SP

== See also ==
- Pakpattan Canal
