= 2013 Punjab provincial election =

Election in Pakistan

- 11 May 2013

297 out of 371 seats in the Punjab Assembly (Note: 66 seats are reserved for women and 8 are reserved for non-Muslims filled through PR) 186 seats needed for a majority
- Turnout: 58.52%(▲10.79%)
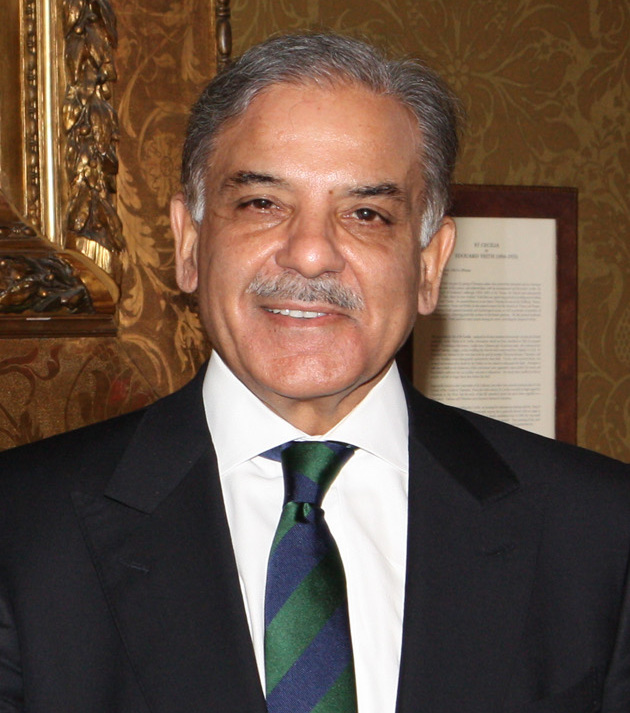

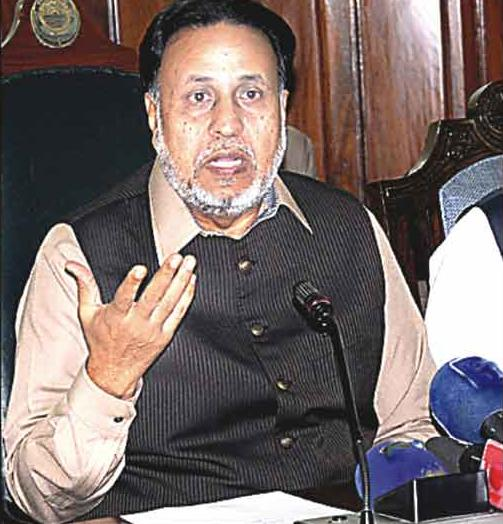

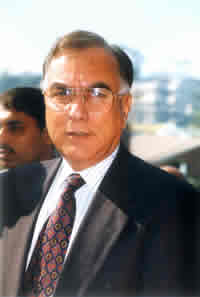
	First party	Second party	Third party
Leader	Shehbaz Sharif	Mehmood-ur-Rasheed	Manzoor Wattoo
Party	PML(N)	PTI	PPP
Leader's seat	Lahore-XXIII; Lahore-XXV; Rajanpur-I	Lahore-XV	Okara-IV
Last election	172 seats, 29.03%	PP-151 (Lahore-XV)	107 seats, 29.00%
Seats won	313	30	8
Seat change	▲141	▲30	▼99
Popular vote	11,365,363	4,951,216	2,464,812
Percentage	40.77%	17.76%	8.84%
Swing	▲13.74%	▲17.76%	▼20.16%
- Punjab Assembly election results (expand to original file to see constituency labels)
Chief Minister before election
Shehbaz Sharif
PML(N)
Elected Chief Minister
Shehbaz Sharif
PML(N)

Provincial elections were held in the Pakistani province of Punjab to elect the 16th Provincial Assembly of the Punjab on 11 May 2013, alongside nationwide general elections and three other provincial elections in Sindh, Balochistan and Khyber Pakhtunkhwa. The remaining two territories of Pakistan, AJK and Gilgit-Baltistan, were ineligible to vote due to their disputed status.

The Pakistan Muslim League (N) returned triumphant in this election, retaining Shehbaz Sharif as Chief Minister of Punjab. They obtained 313 out of 371 total seats, giving them a comfortable 4/5 majority in the assembly.

== Background ==
In the 2008 elections, the PML (N) and the PPP formed a coalition government, with PML (N) as the senior party and Shehbaz Sharif as Chief Minister of Punjab. However, in 2011, the PPP was expelled from this coalition due to corruption in the Federal Government (which was led by the PPP at the time).

== Campaign ==
Overall, due to general mistrust with the federal government, the PML (N) was running on a wave of popular support in Punjab on an anti-PPP platform, due to widespread loadshedding, a slow economic growth rate, and general incompetence in the Federal Level.

On 30 October 2011, former cricketer turned politician Imran Khan held a rally in Punjab's capital city: Lahore. This rally attracted over 100,000 of his supporters and was a power show of his Pakistan Tehreek-e-Insaf. Following this, the popularity of the PTI rapidly increased and it emerged as the main challenger to the PML (N) in Punjab.

Both parties ran on two different platforms: Pakistan Muslim League (N) ran on the issues of tackling the energy conservation crisis, economic reforms and construction of new infrastructure in the country, while the Pakistan Tehreek-e-Insaf ran on a more welfarist, centrist and anti-establishment platform, claiming to be an alternative to both mainstream parties.

== Results ==
Party	Votes	%	Seats			
Party	Votes	%	General	Women	Non-Muslims	Total
Pakistan Muslim League (N)	11,365,363	40.77	248	58	7	313
Pakistan Tehreek-e-Insaf	4,951,216	17.76	24	5	1	30
Pakistan Peoples Party	2,464,812	8.84	7	1	0	8
Pakistan Muslim League (Q)	1,377,130	4.94	6	2	0	8
Jamaat-e-Islami Pakistan	489,772	1.76	1	0	0	1
Other parties	1,009,708	3.62	4	0	0	4
Independents	6,217,856	22.31	7	0	0	7
Total	27,875,857	100.00	297	66	8	371
Registered voters/turnout	48,534,383	–				
Source: ECP, ECP

== Aftermath ==
Following the elections, the Pakistan Muslim League (N) came out with well above a supermajority landslide in the assembly with 313 seats, and were comfortably able to form a government. They were followed by the Pakistan Tehreek-e-Insaf, which held only 30 seats.

This election was notable for the downfall of the Pakistan Peoples Party and the Pakistan Muslim League (Q), which both held 106 and 79 seats respectively before the election and were reduced to merely 8 seats each, due to the rise of PTI and PML (N), although the sheer numbers that the PML (N) held in the assembly shocked many analysts.

Shehbaz Sharif, brother of PML (N) chairman and Prime Minister Nawaz Sharif, became chief minister for the third time in his life, securing over 300 votes in the assembly.
