= 2018 Punjab provincial election =

- 25 July 2018

297 out of 371 seats in the Punjab Assembly (Note: 66 seats are reserved for women and 8 are reserved for non-Muslims filled through PR) 186 seats needed for a majority
- Opinion polls
- Turnout: 56.44% (▼1.78%)
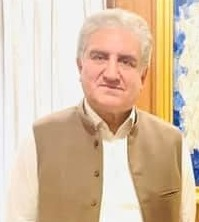

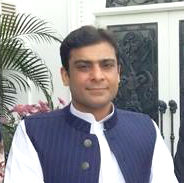
	First party	Second party
Leader	Shah Mahmood Qureshi	Hamza Shahbaz
Party	PTI	PML(N)
Leader's seat	Multan-VII (lost)	Lahore-XXIII
Last election	30 seats, 17.76%	313 seats, 40.77%
Seats won	184	164
Seat change	▲154	▼149
Popular vote	11,157,945	10,550,406
Percentage	33.72%	31.88%
Swing	▲15.96pp	▼8.89pp
- Map of Punjab showing assembly constituencies and winning parties
Chief Minister before election
Shehbaz Sharif
PML(N)
Elected Chief Minister
Usman Buzdar
PTI

Provincial elections were held in the Pakistani province of Punjab on to elect the members of the 17th Provincial Assembly of the Punjab on 25 July 2018, alongside nationwide general elections and three other provincial elections in Sindh, Balochistan and Khyber Pakhtunkhwa. The remaining two territories of Pakistan, AJK and Gilgit-Baltistan, were ineligible to vote due to their disputed status.

After the elections, Pakistan Tehreek-e-Insaf was able to form the government in Punjab, with Sardar Usman Buzdar as the Chief Minister of Punjab.

== Background ==
In the 2013 elections, the Pakistan Muslim League (N) came out with well above a supermajority in the assembly with a landslide haul of 313 seats, and were comfortably able to form a government. They were followed by the Pakistan Tehreek-e-Insaf, which held only 30 seats.

The election was notable for the downfall of the Pakistan Peoples Party and the Pakistan Muslim League (Q), which, before the elections, held 106 and 79 seats respectively but were reduced to merely 8 seats each, due to the rise of PTI and PML (N), although the sheer numbers that the PML (N) held in the assembly shocked many analysts.

Shehbaz Sharif, brother of PML (N) chairman and two-time Prime Minister, Nawaz Sharif, became Chief Minister for the third time in his life, securing over 300 votes in the assembly.

=== Janoobi Punjab Sooba Mahaz ===
On April 10, 2018, 10 of the ruling PML-N's prominent elected candidates from South Punjab, parted ways from the party and announced a movement for the creation of South Punjab province. The movement was titled Janoobi Punjab Sooba Mahaz (lit. Front for South Punjab Province). In the coming weeks, the movement garnered widespread support and dissident MPs from the ruling coalition, as well as independents, started joining it. At its peak, the movement had the backing of 42 MPs. On May 8, 2018, the movement announced its merger with Pakistan Tehreek-e-Insaf, the opposition party in the province, after PTI assured JPSM's leaders that creating the South Punjab province is a priority item in their manifesto for the 2018 elections.

== Results ==
184	164	10	7	1	3
PTI	PML-N	PML-Q	PPP	PRHP	IND

Vote Share of different parties in the election.
1. PTI (33.7%)
2. PML-N (31.9%)
3. TLP (5.72%)
4. PPP (5.38%)
5. PML(Q) (1.19%)
6. IND (18.6%)
7. Other Parties (3.54%)
Seat Share of different parties in the election.
1. PTI (49.6%)
2. PML-N (44.2%)
3. PML(Q) (2.70%)
4. PPP (1.89%)
5. PRHP (0.27%)
6. IND (1.35%)

The results showed a virtual tie between the Pakistan Tehreek-e-Insaf (PTI) and the Pakistan Muslim League (N) (PML(N)). With 24 independents joining the party, the PTI came up just short of an absolute majority. The PTI and the Pakistan Muslim League (Q) (PML(Q)) formed a coalition government in Punjab Assembly.

Party	Votes		Seats							
Party	Votes		General				Women	Non-Muslims	Total	+/−
Party	No.	%	Contested	Won	Independents joined	Total	Women	Non-Muslims	Total	+/−
Pakistan Tehreek-e-Insaf	11,157,945	33.72	284	123	24	147	33	4	184	▲154
Pakistan Muslim League (N)	10,550,406	31.88	270	129	1	130	30	4	164	▼149
Pakistan Muslim League (Q)	392,419	1.19	7	7	1	8	2	0	10	▲2
Pakistan People's Party	1,781,330	5.38	239	6	0	6	1	0	7	▼1
Tehreek-e-Labbaik Pakistan	1,893,453	5.72	264	0	0	0	0	0	0	Steady
Pakistan Rah-e-Haq Party	0	0.00	0	0	1	1	0	0	1	▲1
Independents	6,146,632	18.57	2,255	30	▼27	3			3	▼4
Valid Votes	33,093,912	97.40	3,975	296		296	66	8	369	
Rejected votes	882,575	2.60								
Total Votes Polled	33,976,487	100								
Registered voters/Turnout	60,197,876	56.44	Election was postponed in PP-87 Mianwali-III and PP-103 Faisalabad-VII							
Source: Election Commission of Pakistan

=== Region-wise results ===
Region	Seats	PTI	PML(N)	PML(Q)	PPP	PRHP	IND	Election Postponed
North Punjab	27	23	2	1	0	0	1	0
Central Punjab	175	66	99	5	1	1	1	2
South Punjab	95	58	29	2	5	0	1	0
Total	297	147	130	8	6	3	1	2

=== Division-wise results ===
Division	Seats	PTI	PML(N)	PML(Q)	PPP	PRHP	IND	Election Postponed
Rawalpindi	27	23	2	1	0	0	1	0
Gujranwala	44	10	29	5	0	0	0	0
Sargodha	21	14	6	0	0	0	0	1
Faisalabad	38	21	14	0	1	1	0	1
Lahore	52	16	36	0	0	0	0	0
Sahiwal	20	5	14	0	0	0	1	0
Multan	34	20	13	0	1	0	0	0
Bahawalpur	31	12	13	2	4	0	0	0
D.G Khan	30	26	3	0	0	0	1	0
Total	297	147	130	8	6	1	3	2

=== District-wise results ===
Division	District	Total seats	PTI	PML(N)	PML(Q)	PPP	PRHP	IND	Election Postponed
Rawalpindi	Attock	5	4	1	0	0	0	0	0
Rawalpindi	Rawalpindi	15	14	0	0	0	0	1	0
Rawalpindi	Chakwal	4	2	1	1	0	0	0	0
Rawalpindi	Jhelum	3	3	0	0	0	0	0	0
Gujranwala	Gujrat	7	4	0	3	0	0	0	0
Gujranwala	Sialkot	11	1	9	1	0	0	0	0
Gujranwala	Narowal	5	1	4	0	0	0	0	0
Gujranwala	Gujranwala	14	0	14	0	0	0	0	0
Gujranwala	Mandi Bahauddin	4	2	1	1	0	0	0	0
Gujranwala	Hafizabad	3	2	1	0	0	0	0	0
Sargodha	Sargodha	10	5	5	0	0	0	0	0
Sargodha	Khushab	3	2	1	0	0	0	0	0
Sargodha	Mianwali	4	3	0	0	0	0	0	1
Sargodha	Bhakkar	4	4	0	0	0	0	0	0
Faisalabad	Chiniot	4	2	1	0	1	0	0	0
Faisalabad	Faisalabad	21	10	10	0	0	0	0	1
Faisalabad	Toba Tek Singh	6	3	3	0	0	0	0	0
Faisalabad	Jhang	7	6	0	0	0	1	0	0
Lahore	Nankana Sahib	4	1	3	0	0	0	0	0
Lahore	Sheikhupura	9	4	5	0	0	0	0	0
Lahore	Lahore	30	8	22	0	0	0	0	0
Lahore	Kasur	9	3	6	0	0	0	0	0
Sahiwal	Okara	8	0	7	0	0	0	1	0
Sahiwal	Sahiwal	7	2	5	0	0	0	0	0
Sahiwal	Pakpattan	5	3	2	0	0	0	0	0
Multan	Khanewal	8	4	4	0	0	0	0	0
Multan	Multan	13	10	2	0	1	0	0	0
Multan	Lodhran	5	2	3	0	0	0	0	0
Multan	Vehari	8	4	4	0	0	0	0	0
Bahawalpur	Bahawalnagar	8	2	6	0	0	0	0	0
Bahawalpur	Bahawalpur	10	3	5	2	0	0	0	0
Bahawalpur	Rahim Yar Khan	13	7	2	0	4	0	0	0
Dera Ghazi Khan	Muzaffargarh	12	10	2	0	0	0	0	0
Dera Ghazi Khan	Layyah	5	3	1	0	0	0	1	0
Dera Ghazi Khan	Dera Ghazi Khan	8	8	0	0	0	0	0	0
Dera Ghazi Khan	Rajanpur	5	5	0	0	0	0	0	0
Total		297	147	130	8	6	1	3	2

=== Constituency-wise results ===
District	Constituency		Winner				Runner Up				Margin	Turnout %
District	No.	Name	Candidate	Party	Votes	%	Candidate	Party	Votes	%	Margin	Turnout %
Attock	PP-1	Attock-I	Syed Yawer Abbas Bukhari	PTI	39,667	34.38	Hameed Akbar	IND	24,192	20.97	15,475	54.43
Attock	PP-2	Attock-II	Jahangir Khanzada	PML(N)	46,002	38.38	Qazi Ahmed Akbar	PTI	42,922	35.81	3,080	49.79
Attock	PP-3	Attock-III	Tahir Sadiq Khan	PTI	62,391	45.46	Asif Ali Malik	PML(N)	31,089	22.65	31,302	62.48
Attock	PP-4	Attock-IV	Malik Muhammad Anwar	PTI	49,823	31.42	Sher Ali Khan	PML(N)	40,535	25.57	9,288	66.91
Attock	PP-5	Attock-V	Malik Jamshed Altaf	PTI	57,333	36.94	Malik Bahadur Yar	PML(N)	36,155	23.29	21,178	58.97
Rawalpindi	PP-6	Rawalpindi-I	Muhamamd Latasab Satti	PTI	64,642	42.03	Raja Ashfaq Sarwar	PML(N)	56,772	36.91	7,870	57.55
Rawalpindi	PP-7	Rawalpindi-II	Raja Sagheer Ahmed	IND	44,363	28.78	Raja Muhammad Ali	PML(N)	42,459	27.54	1,904	53.52
Rawalpindi	PP-8	Rawalpindi-III	Javed Kausar	PTI	48,221	33.87	Khurram Pervez Raja	PPP	42,196	29.63	6,025	51.04
Rawalpindi	PP-9	Rawalpindi-IV	Chaudhary Sajid Mehmood	PTI	51,686	34.82	Chaudhry Sarfaraz Ahmad Khan	PPP	29,319	19.75	22,367	58.08
Rawalpindi	PP-10	Rawalpindi-V	Chaudhary Nisar Ali Khan	IND	53,212	33.35	Naseer Ul Husnain Shah	IND	22,271	13.96	30,941	61.12
Rawalpindi	PP-11	Rawalpindi-VI	Chaudhry Muhammad Adnan	PTI	42,892	57.87	Raja Arshad Mehmood	PML(N)	23,838	32.16	19,054	46.71
Rawalpindi	PP-12	Rawalpindi-VII	Wasiq Qayyum Abbasi	PTI	27,415	46.56	Chaudhary Nisar Ali Khan	IND	11,110	18.87	16,305	52.58
Rawalpindi	PP-13	Rawalpindi-VIII	Amjad Mehmood Chaudhry	PTI	39,943	57.50	Chaudhry Sarfraz Afzal	PML(N)	12,512	18.01	27,431	53.64
Rawalpindi	PP-14	Rawalpindi-IX	Muhammad Basharat Raja	PTI	54,211	52.33	Usama Chaudary	PML(N)	32,855	31.72	21,356	51.34
Rawalpindi	PP-15	Rawalpindi-X	Umer Tanveer	PTI	38,584	54.04	Malik Iftikhar Ahmed	PML(N)	22,316	31.26	16,268	52.11
Rawalpindi	PP-16	Rawalpindi-XI	Raja Rashid Hafeez	PTI	64,695	53.04	Arslan Hafeez	PML(N)	44,559	36.53	20,136	50.99
Rawalpindi	PP-17	Rawalpindi-XII	Fayaz Ul Hasan Chohan	PTI	40,984	48.56	Raja Abdul Hanif	PML(N)	30,359	35.97	10,625	51.91
Rawalpindi	PP-18	Rawalpindi-XIII	Ejaz Khan	PTI	44,054	43.93	Malik Shakeel Awan	PML(N)	33,129	33.03	10,925	52.28
Rawalpindi	PP-19	Rawalpindi-XIV	Ammar Saddique Khan	PTI	59,568	50.23	Malik Umer Farooq	PML(N)	30,424	25.66	29,144	63.46
Rawalpindi	PP-20	Rawalpindi-XV	Malik Taimoor Masood	PTI	40,367	42.92	Faisal Iqbal	PML(N)	26,163	27.64	14,204	54.02
Chakwal	PP-21	Chakwal-I	Raja Yasir Humayun	PTI	77,528	50.76	Sultan Haider Ali Khan	PML(N)	65,500	42.89	12,028	58.69
Chakwal	PP-22	Chakwal-II	Tanveer Aslam Malik	PML(N)	73,523	45.44	Tariq Mehmood Afzal	PTI	70,883	43.81	2,640	58.10
Chakwal	PP-23	Chakwal-III	Sardar Aftab Akbar Khan	PTI	78,310	53.60	Mushtaq Ahmad	PML(N)	45,516	31.15	32,794	56.73
Chakwal	PP-24	Chakwal-IV	Ammar Yasir	PML(Q)	81,510	50.03	Shehryar Malik	PML(N)	63,063	38.70	18,447	58.45
Jhelum	PP-25	Jhelum-I	Raja Yawar Kamal Khan	PTI	59,885	35.02	Mahar Muhammad Fayyaz	PML(N)	56,505	33.04	3,380	54.58
Jhelum	PP-26	Jhelum-II	Chaudhry Zafar Iqbal	PTI	64,227	44.55	Chaudhry Lal Hussain	PML(N)	41,679	28.91	22,548	47.67
Jhelum	PP-27	Jhelum-III	Fawad Chaudhry	PTI	67,444	41.14	Nasir Mehmood	PML(N)	65,501	39.95	1,943	54.07
Gujrat	PP-28	Gujrat-I	Shujahat Nawaz	PML(Q)	56,484	41.03	Nawabzada Haider Mahdi	PML(N)	41,470	30.13	15,014	54.97
Gujrat	PP-29	Gujrat-II	Abdullah Warraich	PML(Q)	45,380	34.98	Moeen Nawaz Warraich	PML(N)	30,239	23.31	15,141	50.64
Gujrat	PP-30	Gujrat-III	Chaudhry Parvez Elahi	PML(Q)	75,808	54.71	Zulfiqar Ali Warraich	PML(N)	29,186	21.07	46,622	48.46
Gujrat	PP-31	Gujrat-IV	Saleem Sarwar Jaura	PTI	51,131	48.50	Imran Zafar	PML(N)	20,513	19.46	30,618	45.16
Gujrat	PP-32	Gujrat-V	Mian Akhtar Hayat	PTI	42,264	33.11	Mian Tariq Mehmood	PML(N)	37,569	29.43	4,695	47.35
Gujrat	PP-33	Gujrat-VI	Chaudhry Liaqat Ali	PTI	51,139	36.78	Shabbir Ahmad	PML(N)	48,697	35.02	2,442	51.12
Gujrat	PP-34	Gujrat-VII	Arshad Chaudhary	PTI	58,211	37.78	Raja Aslam Khan	PML(N)	50,632	32.86	7,579	52.57
Sialkot	PP-35	Sialkot-I	Arif Iqbal	PML(N)	46,370	37.98	Mirza Dilawar Baig	PTI	33,887	27.76	12,483	57.08
Sialkot	PP-36	Sialkot-II	Muhammad Akhlaq	PTI	51,496	46.91	Muhammad Akram	PML(N)	42,499	38.71	8,997	51.80
Sialkot	PP-37	Sialkot-III	Khuwaja Mansha Ullah	PML(N)	50,890	45.08	Muhammad Ashiq	PTI	46,552	41.24	4,338	51.00
Sialkot	PP-38	Sialkot-IV	Choudhary Khush Akhtar Subhani	PML(N)	57,636	47.69	Saeed Ahmad Bhalli	PTI	40,575	33.57	17,061	59.39
Sialkot	PP-39	Sialkot-V	Rana Liaqat Ali	IND	30,891	26.39	Mirza Altaf Hussain	PML(N)	30,770	26.29	121	55.36
Sialkot	PP-40	Sialkot-VI	Rana Muhammad Afzal	PML(N)	52,577	44.12	Chaudhry Amjad Ali Bajwa	PTI	36,209	30.38	16,368	55.77
Sialkot	PP-41	Sialkot-VII	Muhammad Rizwan	PML(Q)	32,833	28.74	Syed Atta Ul Hassan	PML(N)	26,902	23.55	5,931	56.31
Sialkot	PP-42	Sialkot-VIII	Zeeshan Rafiq	PML(N)	52,630	46.75	Chaudhry Sadaqat Ali	PTI	30,185	26.81	22,445	55.02
Sialkot	PP-43	Sialkot-IX	Chaudhry Naveed Ashraf	PML(N)	55,555	47.00	Nasir Mehmood Cheema	PTI	37,287	31.55	18,268	58.10
Sialkot	PP-44	Sialkot-X	Chaudhry Arshad Javaid Warraich	PML(N)	58,041	51.34	Chaudhry Azeem Ghumman	PTI	45,818	40.53	12,223	57.80
Sialkot	PP-45	Sialkot-XI	Rana Abdul Sattar	PML(N)	53,767	50.89	Malik Jamshed Ghias	PTI	35,946	34.02	17,821	57.37
Narowal	PP-46	Narowal-I	Syed Saeed ul Hassan	IND	37,388	35.95	Awais Qasim	PTI	30,160	29.00	7,228	56.14
Narowal	PP-47	Narowal-II	Muhammad Ghayas Uddin	PML(N)	18,484	17.77	Naimat Ali Javed	PTI	13,338	12.82	5,146	53.37
Narowal	PP-48	Narowal-III	Rana Mannan Khan	PML(N)	47,255	44.67	Muhammad Arif Khan	PTI	30,378	28.71	16,877	51.58
Narowal	PP-49	Narowal-IV	Bilal Akbar Khan	PML(N)	44,192	41.55	Riffat Javaid	PTI	17,137	16.11	27,055	57.67
Narowal	PP-50	Narowal-V	Khawaja Muhammad Waseem	PML(N)	61,507	50.07	Muhammad Sajjad	PTI	44,031	35.85	17,476	56.81
Gujranwala	PP-51	Gujranwala-I	Shaukat Manzoor Cheema	PML(N)	59,343	48.52	Muhammad Shabir Akram	PTI	27,516	22.50	31,827	53.70
Gujranwala	PP-52	Gujranwala-II	Chaudhary Aadil Bakhsh Chattha	PML(N)	55,195	43.52	Muhammad Ahmad Chattha	PTI	54,097	42.69	1,098	55.83
Gujranwala	PP-53	Gujranwala-III	Bilal Farooq Tarar	PML(N)	47,337	47.19	Jamal Nasir Cheema	PTI	35,045	34.93	12,292	52.97
Gujranwala	PP-54	Gujranwala-IV	Imran Khalid Butt	PML(N)	50,987	45.74	Rizwan Ullah Butt	PTI	49,635	44.53	1,352	52.57
Gujranwala	PP-55	Gujranwala-V	Muhammad Nawaz Chohan	PML(N)	36,882	46.94	Muhammad Arqam Khan	PTI	22,594	28.76	14,288	54.27
Gujranwala	PP-56	Gujranwala-VI	Muhammad Toufeeq Butt	PML(N)	47,387	52.96	Chaudhry Muhammad Tariq	PTI	29,113	32.54	18,274	51.65
Gujranwala	PP-57	Gujranwala-VII	Chaudhary Ashraf Ali	PML(N)	56,512	46.41	Asad Ullah	PTI	40,720	33.44	15,792	50.33
Gujranwala	PP-58	Gujranwala-VIII	Abdul Rauf Mughal	PML(N)	44,237	45.97	S A Hameed	PTI	28,528	29.65	15,709	49.18
Gujranwala	PP-59	Gujranwala-IX	Chaudhry Waqar Ahmad Cheema	PML(N)	40,062	44.47	Sohail Zafar Cheema	PTI	20,532	22.79	19,530	53.26
Gujranwala	PP-60	Gujranwala-X	Qaiser Iqbal	PML(N)	39,828	36.05	Chaudhry Zafarullah Cheema	PTI	30,022	27.18	9,806	56.90
Gujranwala	PP-61	Gujranwala-XI	Chaudhry Akhtar Ali Khan	PML(N)	44,936	47.14	Ehsan Ullah Virk	PTI	29,319	30.76	15,617	54.25
Gujranwala	PP-62	Gujranwala-XII	Aman Ullah Warraich	PML(N)	46,927	47.78	Shazia Bano Mazhar Javed	PTI	25,924	26.40	21,003	55.59
Gujranwala	PP-63	Gujranwala-XIII	Muhammad Iqbal Gujjar	PML(N)	30,477	31.14	Rana Umar Nazir Khan	PTI	23,881	24.40	6,596	58.44
Gujranwala	PP-64	Gujranwala-XIV	Irfan Bashir	PML(N)	46,756	40.37	Khalid Pervaz Virk	PTI	39,163	33.81	7,593	57.09
Mandi Bahauddin	PP-65	Mandi Bahauddin-I	Hameeda Mian	PML(N)	72,447	54.60	Arshad Mahmood	PTI	46,356	34.94	26,091	50.63
Mandi Bahauddin	PP-66	Mandi Bahauddin-II	Muhammad Tariq Tarar	PTI	47,148	36.88	Syed Tariq Yaqoob	IND	39,822	31.15	7,326	54.57
Mandi Bahauddin	PP-67	Mandi Bahauddin-III	Sajid Ahmad Khan	IND	60,233	46.30	Shahid Naseem Tahir	PTI	25,531	19.63	34,702	56.66
Mandi Bahauddin	PP-68	Mandi Bahauddin-IV	Gulraiz Afzal Gondal	PTI	37,982	28.57	Qamar Khan	IND	35,791	26.93	2,191	53.69
Hafizabad	PP-69	Hafizabad-I	Mamoon Jaffar Tarar	PTI	58,421	42.34	Mian Shahid Hussain Khan	PML(N)	51,708	37.48	6,713	62.70
Hafizabad	PP-70	Hafizabad-II	Muzaffer Ali Sheikh	PML(N)	49,116	38.53	Malik Fayaz Ahmad	PTI	46,118	36.18	2,998	55.20
Hafizabad	PP-71	Hafizabad-III	Muhammad Ahsan Jahangir	PTI	47,892	37.01	Syed Shoaib Shahnawaz	TLP	31,058	24.00	16,834	60.02
Sargodha	PP-72	Sargodha-I	Sohaib Ahmad Malik	PML(N)	64,908	46.29	Hassan Inam Piracha	PTI	56,989	40.64	7,919	58.78
Sargodha	PP-73	Sargodha-II	Yasir Zafar Sandhu	PML(N)	45,778	33.90	Khaliq Dad	PTI	30,087	22.28	15,691	55.99
Sargodha	PP-74	Sargodha-III	Mian Manazir Hussain Ranjha	PML(N)	51,526	42.45	Muhammad Ansar Iqbal	PTI	50,382	41.51	1,144	57.18
Sargodha	PP-75	Sargodha-IV	Muhammad Muneeb Sultan Cheema	PTI	63,356	47.30	Muhammad Umar Kalyar	PML(N)	50,477	37.68	12,879	60.92
Sargodha	PP-76	Sargodha-V	Chaudhry Faisal Farooq Cheema	PTI	60,707	44.20	Kamil Shameel	PML(N)	53,463	38.93	7,244	58.69
Sargodha	PP-77	Sargodha-VI	Liaqat Ali Khan	PML(N)	58,405	50.55	Muhammad Iqbal	PTI	37,878	32.78	20,527	52.53
Sargodha	PP-78	Sargodha-VII	Ansar Majeed Khan Niazi	PTI	46,146	43.98	Ammara Rizwan Gill	PML(N)	43,135	41.11	3,011	53.80
Sargodha	PP-79	Sargodha-VIII	Rana Munawar Hussain	PML(N)	54,323	42.22	Faisal Javed	PTI	39,075	30.37	15,248	60.42
Sargodha	PP-80	Sargodha-IX	Ghulam Ali Asghar Khan	PTI	60,723	48.06	Taimur Ali Khan	PML(N)	39,711	31.43	21,012	57.16
Sargodha	PP-81	Sargodha-X	Chaudhry Iftikhar Hussain	PTI	41,633	32.36	Syed Javaid Hasnain	PML(N)	40,752	31.67	881	56.93
Khushab	PP-82	Khushab-I	Fateh Khaliq	PTI	71,925	46.94	Karam Elahi Bandial	PML(N)	43,244	28.22	28,681	58.29
Khushab	PP-83	Khushab-II	Ghulam Rasool Sangha	IND	69,036	44.41	Muhammad Asif Malik	PML(N)	47,764	30.72	21,272	56.04
Khushab	PP-84	Khushab-III	Muhammad Waris Shad	PML(N)	66,775	41.90	Shujah Muhammad Khan	PTI	60,288	37.83	6,487	61.86
Mianwali	PP-85	Mianwali-I	Abdul Rehman Khan	PTI	76,122	61.52	Amanat Ullah Khan	PML(N)	35,370	28.59	40,752	54.86
Mianwali	PP-86	Mianwali-II	Amin Ullah Khan	PTI	59,248	48.58	Adil Abdullah Khan	IND	27,673	22.69	31,575	54.75
Mianwali	PP-87	Mianwali-III	Election postponed									
Mianwali	PP-88	Mianwali-IV	Muhammad Sibtain Khan	PTI	56,016	42.98	Muhammad Feroze Joiya	PML(N)	38,046	29.19	17,970	60.82
Bhakkar	PP-89	Bhakkar-I	Ameer Muhammad Khan	IND	63,414	44.49	Farooq Azam Khan	PML(N)	32,658	22.91	30,756	66.21
Bhakkar	PP-90	Bhakkar-II	Saeed Akbar Khan	IND	59,490	43.92	Irfan Ullah Khan NIazi	PML(N)	45,026	33.24	14,464	66.14
Bhakkar	PP-91	Bhakkar-III	Ghazanfer Abbas	PTI	75,581	48.93	Saeed Akbar Khan	IND	74,022	47.92	1,559	71.42
Bhakkar	PP-92	Bhakkar-IV	Amir Inayat Khan Shahani	PTI	61,819	46.55	Malik Zaheer Ahmad	IND	53,406	39.44	8,413	65.32
Chiniot	PP-93	Chiniot-I	Taimoor Ali Lali	IND	46,733	48.59	Muhammad Haider Lali	PTI	40,819	42.41	5,914	49.74
Chiniot	PP-94	Chiniot-II	Ilyas Chinioti	PML(N)	52,745	49.25	Ali Hassan Raza Qazi	PTI	22,366	20.89	30,379	60.17
Chiniot	PP-95	Chiniot-III	Syed Hassan Murtaza	PPP	38,115	34.77	Muhammad Rehmat Ullah	IND	34,144	31.35	4,011	63.47
Chiniot	PP-96	Chiniot-IV	Saleem Bibi Bharwana	PTI	29,738	26.90	Muhammad Saqlain Anwar	PML(N)	26,474	23.95	3,264	61.94
Faisalabad	PP-97	Faisalabad-I	Muhammad Ajmal Cheema	IND	42,405	34.33	Ali Afzal Sahi	PTI	37,973	30.74	4,432	58.22
Faisalabad	PP-98	Faisalabad-II	Rana Shoaib Adrees Khan	PML(N)	55,727	44.24	Muhammad Afzal Sahi	PTI	44,993	35.72	10,734	59.01
Faisalabad	PP-99	Faisalabad-III	Chaudhry Ali Akhter Khan	PTI	49,260	45.79	Akbar Ali	PML(N)	43,765	40.69	5,495	57.30
Faisalabad	PP-100	Faisalabad-IV	Chaudhry Zaheer Ud Din	PTI	41,357	35.63	Iffat Mairaj Awan	PML(N)	25,113	21.64	16,244	53.66
Faisalabad	PP-101	Faisalabad-V	Rai Haidar Ali Khan	PML(N)	46,097	36.97	Ghulam Haider Bari	PTI	44,308	35.54	1,789	54.92
Faisalabad	PP-102	Faisalabad-VI	Adil Pervaiz	PTI	38,121	31.12	Sikandar Hayyat Khan	PML(N)	36,960	30.17	1,161	56.83
Faisalabad	PP-103	Faisalabad-VII	Election postponed									
Faisalabad	PP-104	Faisalabad-VIII	Muhammad Safdar Shakir	PML(N)	42,756	34.56	Shahid Khalil Noor	PTI	33,400	27.00	9,356	55.84
Faisalabad	PP-105	Faisalabad-IX	Hafiz Mumtaz Ahmed	PTI	50,267	37.15	Kashif Raheem Khan	PML(N)	42,492	31.40	7,775	55.79
Faisalabad	PP-106	Faisalabad-X	Umar Farooq	IND	49,996	39.73	Sardar Dilnawaz Ahmad	PTI	40,413	32.12	9,583	56.40
Faisalabad	PP-107	Faisalabad-XI	Shafiq Ahmad	PML(N)	36,901	41.35	Khalid Rafi	PTI	33,511	37.55	3,390	54.77
Faisalabad	PP-108	Faisalabad-XII	Muhammad Ajmal	PML(N)	46,055	42.13	Aftab Ahmad Khan	PTI	43,471	39.77	2,584	59.04
Faisalabad	PP-109	Faisalabad-XIII	Chaudhry Zafar Iqbal Nagra	PML(N)	53,100	47.69	Nadeem Aftab Sindhu	PTI	46,129	41.43	6,971	58.98
Faisalabad	PP-110	Faisalabad-XIV	Khayal Ahmad	PTI	69,509	51.28	Malik Muhammad Nawaz	PML(N)	58,444	43.12	11,065	60.43
Faisalabad	PP-111	Faisalabad-XV	Shakeel Shahid	PTI	57,539	40.52	Asrar Ahmed Khan	PML(N)	51,654	36.38	5,885	57.08
Faisalabad	PP-112	Faisalabad-XVI	Muhammad Tahir Pervaiz	PML(N)	49,455	46.96	Adnan Anwar	PTI	46,769	44.41	2,686	55.17
Faisalabad	PP-113	Faisalabad-XVII	Muhammad Waris Aziz	PTI	61,094	47.37	Rana Sana Ullah	PML(N)	56,079	43.49	5,015	58.22
Faisalabad	PP-114	Faisalabad-XVIII	Chaudhry Latif Nazar Gujjar	PTI	59,501	48.61	Sheikh Ijaz Ahmad	PML(N)	50,343	40.99	9,158	56.59
Faisalabad	PP-115	Faisalabad-XIX	Rana Ali Abbas Khan	PML(N)	53,271	45.33	Asad Muazzam	PTI	52,736	44.83	535	58.08
Faisalabad	PP-116	Faisalabad-XX	Chaudhry Faqeer Hussain Dogar	PML(N)	48,619	47.41	Mahboob Alam	PTI	43,014	41.94	5,605	57.63
Faisalabad	PP-117	Faisalabad-XXI	Mehar Hamid Rashid	PML(N)	48,757	46.99	Hassan Masood	PTI	41,584	40.08	7,173	57.31
Toba Tek Singh	PP-118	Toba Tek Singh-I	Chaudhary Khalid Javed Warraich	PML(N)	43,256	34.01	Asad Zaman	PTI	42,820	33.67	436	59.69
Toba Tek Singh	PP-119	Toba Tek Singh-II	Abdul Qadeer Alvi	PML(N)	46,776	38.96	Muhammad Khalid Bashir	PTI	33,210	27.66	13,566	57.34
Toba Tek Singh	PP-120	Toba Tek Singh-III	Sardar Muhammad Ayub Khan	PML(N)	71,527	50.55	Javed Akram	PTI	55,357	39.12	16,170	59.73
Toba Tek Singh	PP-121	Toba Tek Singh-IV	Saeed Ahmad	PTI	62,028	47.02	Amjad Ali	PML(N)	56,522	42.85	5,506	59.06
Toba Tek Singh	PP-122	Toba Tek Singh-V	Ashifa Riaz Fatyana	PTI	63,924	50.08	Nazia Raheel	PML(N)	44,739	35.05	19,185	59.41
Toba Tek Singh	PP-123	Toba Tek Singh-VI	Syed Qutab Ali Shah	PML(N)	53,122	41.45	Syeda Sonia Ali Raza Shah	PTI	53,105	41.43	17	61.01
Jhang	PP-124	Jhang-I	Rai Taimoor Khan	IND	32,143	27.73	Syed Ali Akbar	PPP	24,255	20.92	7,888	59.71
Jhang	PP-125	Jhang-II	Faisal Hayat	IND	51,050	42.47	Mian Muhammad Azam Cheela	PTI	38,699	32.19	12,351	63.54
Jhang	PP-126	Jhang-III	Moavia Azam Tariq	IND	65,646	50.87	Sheikh Sheraz Akram	IND	32,934	25.52	32,712	54.3
Jhang	PP-127	Jhang-IV	Mehar Muhammad Aslam	IND	27,535	24.06	Mehar Muhammad Nawaz	PTI	26,765	23.39	770	61.48
Jhang	PP-128	Jhang-V	Ghazanfar Abbas Shah	PTI	50,198	40.16	Khalid Mahmood	IND	47,072	37.66	3,126	62.50
Jhang	PP-129	Jhang-VI	Mian Muhammad Asif	PTI	23,434	20.66	Madhulal Hussain	IND	22,431	19.78	1,003	63.10
Jhang	PP-130	Jhang-VII	Rana Shahbaz Ahmad	PTI	63,684	54.30	Muhammad Aoun Abbas	IND	48,449	41.31	15,235	64.32
Nankana Sahib	PP-131	Nankana Sahib-I	Mian Ijaz Hussain Bhatti	PML(N)	37,118	30.57	Shazia Cheema	IND	35,886	29.56	1,232	59.65
Nankana Sahib	PP-132	Nankana Sahib-II	Mian Muhammad Atif	PTI	48,672	42.84	Rana Muhammad Arshad	PML(N)	41,482	36.51	7,190	56.00
Nankana Sahib	PP-133	Nankana Sahib-III	Muhammad Kashif	PML(N)	26,458	25.62	Shahid Manzoor Gill	PTI	24,169	23.40	2,289	59.05
Nankana Sahib	PP-134	Nankana Sahib-IV	Agha Ali Haidar	PML(N)	28,478	26.52	Muhammad Aslam Khan	PTI	26,240	24.43	2,238	58.85
Sheikhupura	PP-135	Sheikhupura-I	Umar Aftab Dhillon	PTI	51,169	49.26	Muhammad Hassan Riaz	PML(N)	41,033	39.50	10,136	57.19
Sheikhupura	PP-136	Sheikhupura-II	Khurram Ijaz	PTI	52,604	50.81	Chaudhry Mushtaq Ahmed	PML(N)	33,633	32.48	18,971	55.48
Sheikhupura	PP-137	Sheikhupura-III	Pir Muhammad Ashraf Rasool	PML(N)	37,959	45.70	Ali Abbas	PTI	31,513	37.94	6,446	56.24
Sheikhupura	PP-138	Sheikhupura-IV	Mian Abdul Rauf	PML(N)	34,478	42.12	Muhammad Ashfaq	PTI	21,101	25.78	13,377	59.14
Sheikhupura	PP-139	Sheikhupura-V	Jaleel Ahmed Sharaqpuri	PML(N)	31,010	28.15	Rao Jahanzaib	PTI	27,153	24.65	3,857	58.92
Sheikhupura	PP-140	Sheikhupura-VI	Mian Khalid Mehmood	PTI	32,965	30.68	Yasir Iqbal	IND	26,046	24.24	6,919	54.46
Sheikhupura	PP-141	Sheikhupura-VII	Mahmood ul Haq	PML(N)	37,443	33.01	Abid Hussain Chattha	PTI	27,719	24.44	9,724	59.61
Sheikhupura	PP-142	Sheikhupura-VIII	Sher Akbar Khan	PTI	27,185	25.01	Ishtiaq Ahmad	PML(N)	22,272	20.49	4,913	58.62
Sheikhupura	PP-143	Sheikhupura-IX	Sajjad Haider Nadeem	PML(N)	31,247	23.07	Muhammad Sarfraz	IND	31,082	22.95	165	57.17
Lahore	PP-144	Lahore-I	Sami Ullah Khan	PML(N)	45,538	47.25	Chaudhry Khalid Mehmood	PTI	37,029	38.42	8,509	51.19
Lahore	PP-145	Lahore-II	Ghazali Saleem Butt	PML(N)	47,345	49.10	Muhammad Asif Javed	PTI	27,915	29.85	19,430	51.33
Lahore	PP-146	Lahore-III	Hamza Shehbaz Sharif	PML(N)	71,393	54.67	Zaman Naseeb	PTI	43,433	33.26	27,960	48.71
Lahore	PP-147	Lahore-IV	Mian Mujtaba Shuja-ur-Rehman	PML(N)	63,301	57.02	Muhammad Tariq Saadat	PTI	28,903	26.03	34,398	47.77
Lahore	PP-148	Lahore-V	Chaudhry Shahbaz Ahmad	PML(N)	60,160	49.78	Muhammad Ajasam Sharif	PTI	43,223	35.50	16,937	51.88
Lahore	PP-149	Lahore-VI	Mian Marghoob Ahmad	PML(N)	66,960	46.56	Zubair Khan Niazi	PTI	61,278	42.61	5,682	52.75
Lahore	PP-150	Lahore-VII	Bilal Yasin	PML(N)	56,038	51.97	Chaudhry Muhammad Asghar	PTI	37,316	34.61	18,722	51.90
Lahore	PP-151	Lahore-VIII	Muhammad Aslam Iqbal	PTI	65,863	50.95	Baqir Hussain	PML(N)	51,980	40.21	13,883	52.29
Lahore	PP-152	Lahore-IX	Rana Mashood Ahmad Khan	PML(N)	43,670	44.17	Muhammad Irshad Dogar	PTI	37,166	37.59	6,504	52.17
Lahore	PP-153	Lahore-X	Khawaja Imran Nazeer	PML(N)	44,557	58.50	Chaudhry Khalid Mehmood Ghurki	PTI	19,647	25.79	24,910	48.18
Lahore	PP-154	Lahore-XI	Bao Chaudhry Akhtar Ali	PML(N)	53,530	55.43	Hafiz Mansab Awan	PTI	30,047	31.11	23,483	54.12
Lahore	PP-155	Lahore-XII	Malik Ghulam Habib Awan	PML(N)	39,515	45.97	Javed Anwar Awan	PTI	18,597	21.63	20,918	55.92
Lahore	PP-156	Lahore-XIII	Malik Muhammad Waheed	PML(N)	52,742	51.57	Mian Muhammad Iftikhar	PTI	36,937	36.12	15,805	54.84
Lahore	PP-157	Lahore-XIV	Khawaja Salman Rafique	PML(N)	40,125	46.96	Muhammad Shoaib Siddiqui	PTI	35,415	41.45	4,710	52.86
Lahore	PP-158	Lahore-XV	Abdul Aleem Khan	PTI	52,319	49.47	Rana Ahsan	PML(N)	45,229	42.77	7,090	54.97
Lahore	PP-159	Lahore-XVI	Murad Raas	PTI	55,184	49.24	Muhammad Numan	PML(N)	46,476	41.47	8,708	52.32
Lahore	PP-160	Lahore-XVII	Mian Mahmood ur Rashid	PTI	63,136	51.04	Touseef Hussain Shah	PML(N)	50,579	40.89	12,584	53.29
Lahore	PP-161	Lahore-XVIII	Malik Nadeem Abbas	PTI	35,040	47.68	Faisal Ayub	PML(N)	30,994	42.18	4,046	51.68
Lahore	PP-162	Lahore-XIX	Muhammad Yasin Amir	PML(N)	41,757	43.34	Abdul Aleem Khan	PTI	41,032	42.59	725	52.52
Lahore	PP-163	Lahore-XX	Mian Naseer Ahmad	PML(N)	32,442	46.99	Bilal Aslam	PTI	30,414	44.06	2,028	52.05
Lahore	PP-164	Lahore-XXI	Shebaz Sharif	PML(N)	40,086	48.43	Tahir Majeed	PTI	19,218	23.22	20,868	61.65
Lahore	PP-165	Lahore-XXII	Shebaz Sharif	PML(N)	43,322	53.72	Muhammad Yousaf	PTI	22,961	28.47	20,361	62.85
Lahore	PP-166	Lahore-XXIII	Ramzan Siddique Bhatti	PML(N)	42,070	44.58	Abdul Karim Kalwar	PTI	34,012	36.04	8,058	50.82
Lahore	PP-167	Lahore-XXIV	Nazir Ahmad Chohan	PTI	40,680	43.66	Mian Muhammad Saleem	PML(N)	38,444	41.26	2,236	54.19
Lahore	PP-168	Lahore-XXV	Khawaja Saad Rafique	PML(N)	34,119	54.37	Muhammad Fiaz Bhatti	PTI	14,950	23.82	19,169	50.32
Lahore	PP-169	Lahore-XXVI	Akhtar Hussain Badshah	PML(N)	31.460	54.17	Nakash Saleem	PTI	13,236	22.79	18,224	53.46
Lahore	PP-170	Lahore-XXVII	Muhammad Amin Zulqernain	PTI	25,215	47.16	Imran Javaid	PML(N)	20,765	38.83	4,450	54.47
Lahore	PP-171	Lahore-XXVIII	Rana Muhamamd Tariq	PML(N)	30,664	42.12	Javaid Umar	PTI	18,345	25.20	12,319	54.64
Lahore	PP-172	Lahore-XXIX	Muhammad Mirza Javed	PML(N)	24,382	30.38	Abdul Rasheed Bhatti	IND	18,710	23.31	5,672	57.92
Lahore	PP-173	Lahore-XXX	Sarfraz Hussain	PTI	29,731	45.10	Irfan Shafi Khokhar	IND	27,640	41.93	2,091	55.51
Kasur	PP-174	Kasur-I	Muhammad Naeem Safdar	PML(N)	55,485	50.90	Muhammad Maqsood Sabir Ansari	PTI	24,852	22.80	30,633	56.64
Kasur	PP-175	Kasur-II	Malik Ahmad Saeed Khan	PML(N)	42,140	34.17	Muzammil Masood	PTI	28,063	22.76	14,077	61.04
Kasur	PP-176	Kasur-III	Malik Ahmad Khan	PML(N)	50,339	41.10	Sardar Muhammad Hussain	PTI	31,486	25.71	18,853	62.81
Kasur	PP-177	Kasur-IV	Muhammad Hashim Dogar	PTI	41,606	32.82	Ahsan Raza Khan	PML(N)	39,936	31.51	1,670	60.03
Kasur	PP-178	Kasur-V	Sheikh Alla Uddin	PML(N)	37,404	30.67	Humble Sanaa Kareemi	IND	28,727	23.55	8,677	60.51
Kasur	PP-179	Kasur-VI	Malik Mukhtar Ahmad	PTI	29,330	23.66	Mehmood Anwar	PML(N)	25,621	20.66	3,709	59.62
Kasur	PP-180	Kasur-VII	Sardar Asif Nakai	PTI	54,092	45.59	Rana Muhammad Hayat Khan	PML(N)	46,177	38.92	7,915	61.35
Kasur	PP-181	Kasur-VIII	Rana Muhammad Iqbal Khan	PML(N)	44,600	38.88	Rana Muhammad Aslam Khan	PTI	41,524	36.20	3,076	61.04
Kasur	PP-182	Kasur-IX	Muhammad Ilyas Khan	PML(N)	43,038	35.14	Muhammad Dawar Hayat	PTI	18,611	15.20	24,427	61.43
Okara	PP-183	Okara-I	Javaid Alla-ud-Din Sajid	PML(N)	42,493	33.24	Muhammad Javed	PTI	29,812	23.32	12,681	59.92
Okara	PP-184	Okara-II	Syeda Maimanat Mohsin	IND	63,226	48.49	Syed Raza Ali Gillani	IND	41,621	31.92	21,605	58.65
Okara	PP-185	Okara-III	Chaudry Iftikhar Hussain Chachar	PML(N)	48,921	41.34	Rubina Shaheen Wattoo	PTI	42,641	36.03	6,280	57.85
Okara	PP-186	Okara-IV	Noor Ul Amin Wattoo	PML(N)	57,463	46.88	Khurrum Jahangir Watto	PTI	50,399	41.06	7,064	57.00
Okara	PP-187	Okara-V	Malik Ali Abbas Khokhar	PML(N)	44,524	38.38	Chaudhry Tariq Irshad Khan	PTI	37,013	31.90	7,511	57.87
Okara	PP-188	Okara-VI	Mian Yawar Zaman	PML(N)	54,806	47.80	Ch M Abdullah Tahir	PTI	52,246	45.57	2,560	60.69
Okara	PP-189	Okara-VII	Muneeb ul Haq	PML(N)	69,561	57.45	Muhammad Saleem	PTI	40,580	33.52	28,981	53.72
Okara	PP-190	Okara-VIII	Ghulam Raza	PML(N)	42,164	31.08	Hamad Aslam	PTI	41,241	30.40	923	60.86
Pakpattan	PP-191	Pakpattan-I	Muhammad Farrukh Mumtaz Maneka	PTI	29,388	27.75	Farooq Ahmad Maneka	IND	29,277	27.65	111	57.45
Pakpattan	PP-192	Pakpattan-II	Mian Naveed Ali	PML(N)	47,016	42.64	Azmat Muhammad Chishti	PTI	35,526	32.22	11,490	57.41
Pakpattan	PP-193	Pakpattan-III	Ahmad Shah Khaga	PTI	45,147	39.86	Sardar Mansib Ali Dogar	IND	31,914	28.18	13,233	58.06
Pakpattan	PP-194	Pakpattan-IV	Chaudhry Muhammad Naeem Ibrahim	PTI	61,573	47.61	Farrukh Javed	PML(N)	54,374	42.04	7,199	60.71
Pakpattan	PP-195	Pakpattan-V	Kashif Ali Chishty	PML(N)	48,670	40.78	Khan Ameer Hamza Rath	PTI	38,221	32.02	10,449	59.52
Sahiwal	PP-196	Sahiwal-I	Peer Khizer Hayat Shah Khagga	PML(N)	50,412	44.12	Muzaffar Shah Khagga	PTI	30,680	26.85	19,732	56.53
Sahiwal	PP-197	Sahiwal-II	Malik Nadeem Kamran	PML(N)	63,252	52.03	Sheikh Muhammad	PTI	40,970	33.70	22,282	54.75
Sahiwal	PP-198	Sahiwal-III	Muhammad Arshad Malik	PML(N)	46,301	39.68	Malik Faisal Ahmad Dhakoo	PTI	31,225	26.76	15,076	59.43
Sahiwal	PP-199	Sahiwal-IV	Naveed Aslam Khan Lodhi	PML(N)	41,707	40.07	Irshad Hussain	PTI	28,187	27.08	13,520	56.04
Sahiwal	PP-200	Sahiwal-V	Rana Riaz Ahmad	PML(N)	48,989	42.86	Waheed Asghar	PTI	38,967	34.09	10,022	53.98
Sahiwal	PP-201	Sahiwal-VI	Rai Muhammad Murtaza Iqbal	PTI	66,551	51.72	Muhammad Hanif	PML(N)	48,979	38.07	17,572	56.47
Sahiwal	PP-202	Sahiwal-VII	Nauman Ahmad Langrial	PTI	57,540	50.83	Shahid Munir	PML(N)	44,349	39.18	13,191	58.71
Khanewal	PP-203	Khanewal-I	Syed Khawar Ali Shah	IND	48,672	43.95	Muhammad Akbar Hayat Hiraj	PTI	47,267	42.68	1,405	62.15
Khanewal	PP-204	Khanewal-II	Hussain Jahania Gardezi	IND	51,074	45.91	Abbas Zafar Hiraj	PTI	33,042	29.70	18,032	57.79
Khanewal	PP-205	Khanewal-III	Hamid Yar Hiraj	PTI	57,203	48.02	Chaudhry Fazal Ur Rehman	PML(N)	54,290	45.58	2,913	60.28
Khanewal	PP-206	Khanewal-IV	Nishat Khan Daha	PML(N)	51,478	45.02	Rana Muhammad Saleem	PTI	47,917	41.91	3,561	57.18
Khanewal	PP-207	Khanewal-V	Syed Abbas Ali Shah	PTI	43,227	38.26	Amir Hayat Hiraj	PML(N)	40,341	35.71	2,886	58.60
Khanewal	PP-208	Khanewal-VI	Babar Hussain Abid	PML(N)	55,067	46.46	Muhammad Jamshaid Shoukat	PTI	52,690	44.45	2,377	59.08
Khanewal	PP-209	Khanewal-VII	Muhammad Faisal Khan Niazi	PML(N)	55,273	43.63	Abdul Razzaq Khan	PTI	39,064	30.83	16,209	61.28
Khanewal	PP-210	Khanewal-VIII	Haji Atta Ur Rehman	PML(N)	48,923	40.26	Khalid Javed	PTI	45,651	37.57	3,272	61.72
Multan	PP-211	Multan-I	Ali Haider Gillani	PPP	39,534	37.00	Chaudhry Khalid Javed Warraich	PTI	27,909	26.12	11,625	59.95
Multan	PP-212	Multan-II	Muhammad Saleem Akhtar	PTI	26,066	27.16	Nazim Ali	PPP	21,875	22.79	4,191	55.60
Multan	PP-213	Multan-III	Waseem Khan Badozai	PTI	46,592	48.26	Malik Muhammad Ali	PML(N)	27,814	28.81	18,778	49.38
Multan	PP-214	Multan-IV	Muhammad Zaheer ud Din Khan Alizai	PTI	45,258	49.33	Malik Asif Rafique Rajwana	PML(N)	25,218	26.32	20,040	48.35
Multan	PP-215	Multan-V	Javed Akhtar Ansari	PTI	51,703	53.03	Muhammad Aamir Manzoor	PML(N)	31,151	31.95	20,552	48.85
Multan	PP-216	Multan-VI	Muhammad Nadeem Qureshi	PTI	56,872	45.76	Ehsan ud Din Qureshi	PML(N)	44,524	35.82	12,348	50.53
Multan	PP-217	Multan-VII	Muhammad Salman Naeem	IND	35,300	37.78	Shah Mahmood Qureshi	PTI	31,734	33.96	3,566	51.37
Multan	PP-218	Multan-VIII	Malik Mazhar Abbas Raan	PTI	45,872	39.70	Malik Muhammad Abbas	PPP	37,530	32.48	8,342	59.11
Multan	PP-219	Multan-IX	Muhammad Akhtar	PTI	39,109	39.88	Muhammad Iqbal	PML(N)	25,021	25.51	14,088	57.12
Multan	PP-220	Multan-X	Mian Tariq Abdullah	PTI	33,628	31.30	Kamran Muhammad Abdullah	PPP	32,875	30.60	753	57.76
Multan	PP-221	Multan-XI	Rana Ijaz Ahmad Noon	PML(N)	48,077	44.59	Sohail Ahmad Noon	PTI	32,609	30.25	15,468	55.79
Multan	PP-222	Multan-XII	Malik Ghulam Abbas	PTI	47,521	42.77	Mehdi Abbas Khan	PML(N)	36,017	32.41	11,504	58.64
Multan	PP-223	Multan-XIII	Naghma Mushtaq	PML(N)	46,935	43.97	Malik Muhammad Akram Kahon	PTI	44,588	41.77	2,347	54.71
Lodhran	PP-224	Lodhran-I	Zawar Hussain Warraich	PTI	60,872	50.85	Muhammad Aamir Iqbal Shah	PML(N)	48,253	40.31	12,619	62.11
Lodhran	PP-225	Lodhran-II	Muhammad Jahangir Bhutta	PML(N)	40,316	36.69	Tahir Hussain Khan	PTI	38,767	35.28	1,549	61.79
Lodhran	PP-226	Lodhran-III	Shah Muhammad Joya	PML(N)	41,835	41.51	Rana Muhammad Faraz Noon	PTI	39,347	39.04	2,488	58.15
Lodhran	PP-227	Lodhran-IV	Muhammad Sidique Khan	PML(N)	46,086	49.86	Nawab Aman Ullah Khan	PTI	39,068	42.47	7,018	55.42
Lodhran	PP-228	Lodhran-V	Nazir Ahmad Khan	PTI	43,256	41.78	Syed Rafi Uddin	PML(N)	39,869	38.51	3,387	57.34
Vehari	PP-229	Vehari-I	Chaudhry Muhammad Yousaf Kaselya	PML(N)	40,434	33.45	Humayon Iftikhar Chishti	PTI	26,321	21.78	14,113	57.69
Vehari	PP-230	Vehari-II	Khalid Mehmood Dogar	PML(N)	36,929	33.59	Khalid Zubair Nisar	PTI	32,945	29.97	3,984	54.17
Vehari	PP-231	Vehari-III	Mian Irfan Aqueel Daultana	PML(N)	17,125	16.15	Ishaq Khan Khakwani	PTI	16,229	15.31	896	56.76
Vehari	PP-232	Vehari-IV	Muhammad Ejaz Hussain	PTI	27,346	25.90	Bilal Akbar Bhatti	PML(N)	25,515	24.17	1,831	59.14
Vehari	PP-233	Vehari-V	Rai Zahoor Ahmad	PTI	35,127	31.27	Saeed Ahmad Khan Manais	PML(N)	24,977	22.24	10,150	60.21
Vehari	PP-234	Vehari-VI	Muhammad Saqib Khurshid	PML(N)	37,992	32.29	Zahid Iqbal Chaudhry	PTI	34,562	29.38	3,430	55.68
Vehari	PP-235	Vehari-VII	Muhammad Ali Raza Khan Khakwani	PTI	49,759	44.25	Asif Saeed	PML(N)	43,963	39.01	5,796	58.96
Vehari	PP-236	Vehari-VIII	Muhammad Jahanzaib Khan Khichi	PTI	38,033	37.48	Azhar Ahmad Khan	PML(N)	20,490	20.19	17,543	53.87
Bahawalnagar	PP-237	Bahawalnagar-I	Mian Fida Hussain Wattoo	IND	56,862	47.74	Muhammad Tariq Usman	PTI	47,763	40.10	9,099	65.03
Bahawalnagar	PP-238	Bahawalnagar-II	Shoukat Ali Laleka	IND	47,242	47.13	Nazar Muhammad	PTI	39,946	39.85	7,296	60.72
Bahawalnagar	PP-239	Bahawalnagar-III	Rana Abdul Rauf	PML(N)	42,573	38.99	Ehtesham ul Haq Laleka	PTI	25,813	23.64	16,760	56.53
Bahawalnagar	PP-240	Bahawalnagar-IV	Chaudhry Muhammad Jameel	PML(N)	23,681	23.74	Mumtaz Ahmad Maharwi	PTI	17,841	13.83	5,840	57.43
Bahawalnagar	PP-241	Bahawalnagar-V	Chaudhry Kashif Mahmood	PML(N)	49,005	44.87	Malik Muhammad Muzaffar Khan	PTI	44,737	40.96	4,268	56.17
Bahawalnagar	PP-242	Bahawalnagar-VI	Chaudhry Zahid Akram	PML(N)	41,179	34.90	Muhammad Abdullah Vains	PTI	36,995	31.35	4,184	59.47
Bahawalnagar	PP-243	Bahawalnagar-VII	Chaudhry Mazhar Iqbal	PML(N)	46,138	36.79	Ghulam Murtaza	PML(Z)	39,388	31.40	6,750	60.07
Bahawalnagar	PP-244	Bahawalnagar-VIII	Chaudhry Muhammad Arshad	PML(N)	40,163	34.28	Kashif Naveed	IND	31,485	26.87	8,678	60.85
Bahawalpur	PP-245	Bahawalpur-I	Zaheer Iqbal Channar	PML(N)	47,200	50.74	Muhammad Asgher	PTI	42,246	45.41	4,954	54.57
Bahawalpur	PP-246	Bahawalpur-II	Sami Ullah Chaudhary	PTI	46,260	50.03	Rana Tariq Khan	PML(N)	36,868	39.87	9,392	50.21
Bahawalpur	PP-247	Bahawalpur-III	Kazim Ali Pirzada	PML(N)	51,497	45.18	Muhammad Nawaz	IND	29,917	26.25	21,580	60.79
Bahawalpur	PP-248	Bahawalpur-IV	Muhammad Afzal Gill	PML(N)	48,983	40.39	Khalil Ahmad	IND	34,778	28.68	14,205	59.41
Bahawalpur	PP-249	Bahawalpur-V	Ehsan-ul-Haque Chaudhry	PML(Q)	48,433	41.45	Chaudhry Khalid Mehmood Jajja	PML(N)	47,868	40.97	565	62.51
Bahawalpur	PP-250	Bahawalpur-VI	Muhammad Afzal	PML(Q)	51,311	47.62	Saad Masood	PML(N)	47,797	44.53	3,514	66.04
Bahawalpur	PP-251	Bahawalpur-VII	Khalid Mehmood Babar	PML(N)	43,058	42.06	Malik Jahanzaib Waron	PTI	21,806	21.30	21,252	55.79
Bahawalpur	PP-252	Bahawalpur-VIII	Muhammad Shoaib Awaisi	PML(N)	45,467	42.18	Ahmed Usman Nawaz	PTI	26,406	24.50	19,061	56.25
Bahawalpur	PP-253	Bahawalpur-IX	Sahibzada Gazain Abbasi	PTI	36,420	40.38	Qazi Adnan Fareed	PML(N)	31,364	34.77	5,056	51.72
Bahawalpur	PP-254	Bahawalpur-X	Syed Iftikhar Hassan Gillani	PTI	36,665	37.52	Syed Aamir Ali Shah	PPP	27,408	28.04	9,257	53.75
Rahim Yar Khan	PP-255	Rahim Yar Khan-I	Sardar Ghaznafar Ali Khan	PPP	40,314	40.22	Muhammad Masood Alam	PTI	39,077	38.98	1,237	57.72
Rahim Yar Khan	PP-256	Rahim Yar Khan-II	Muhammad Aamir Nawaz Khan	PTI	36,468	36.09	Qazi Ahmad Saeed	PPP	31,552	31.23	4,916	55.01
Rahim Yar Khan	PP-257	Rahim Yar Khan-III	Chaudhry Masood Ahmad	PTI	36,914	39.47	Muhammad Islam Aslam	PML(N)	26,962	28.83	9,952	58.79
Rahim Yar Khan	PP-258	Rahim Yar Khan-IV	Mian Shafi Muhammad	PTI	42,496	39.36	Mian Muhammad Aslam	PPP	31,478	29.15	11,018	54.34
Rahim Yar Khan	PP-259	Rahim Yar Khan-V	Hashim Jawan Bakht	PTI	46,582	45.25	Makhdoom Irtaza Hashmi	PPP	26,012	25.27	20,570	53.80
Rahim Yar Khan	PP-260	Rahim Yar Khan-VI	Muhammad Arshad Javed	PML(N)	35,811	33.39	Abdul Majid	PTI	27,695	25.83	8,116	53.32
Rahim Yar Khan	PP-261	Rahim Yar Khan-VII	Hashim Jawan Bakht	PTI	38,051	36.83	Hassan Raza Hashmi	PPP	28,664	27.75	9,387	57.68
Rahim Yar Khan	PP-262	Rahim Yar Khan-VIII	Asif Majeed	PTI	48,799	43.62	Muhammad Omar Jaffar	PML(N)	33,708	30.13	15,091	53.64
Rahim Yar Khan	PP-263	Rahim Yar Khan-IX	Chaudhry Muhammad Shafique	PTI	46,481	39.76	Mehmood Ul Hassan	PML(N)	42,023	35.95	4,458	61.30
Rahim Yar Khan	PP-264	Rahim Yar Khan-X	Syed Usman Mehmood	PPP	51,458	52.50	Muhammad Tariq	PML(N)	21,905	22.35	29,553	54.74
Rahim Yar Khan	PP-265	Rahim Yar Khan-XI	Rais Nabeel Ahmad	PPP	39,823	43.19	Muhammad Safdar Khan	PML(N)	26,856	29.13	12,967	56.27
Rahim Yar Khan	PP-266	Rahim Yar Khan-XII	Mumtaz Ali Khan Chang	PPP	35,370	37.95	Shaukat Daud	PML(N)	20,886	22.41	14,484	59.26
Rahim Yar Khan	PP-267	Rahim Yar Khan-XIII	Chaudhry Muhammad Shafiq Anwar	PML(N)	42,422	41.65	Sajjad Ahmad	PTI	42,029	41.26	393	59.57
Muzaffargarh	PP-268	Muzaffargarh-I	Malik Ghulam Qasim Hanjra	PML(N)	30,492	31.05	Rana Aurang Zaib	IND	29,278	29.81	1,214	62.65
Muzaffargarh	PP-269	Muzaffargarh-II	Azhar Abbas Chandia	PML(N)	28,310	27.28	Ghulam Murtaza Raheem	PTI	24,035	23.16	4,275	62.80
Muzaffargarh	PP-270	Muzaffargarh-III	Abdul Hayi Dasti	IND	17,717	18.88	Muhammad Ajmal Khan	ARP	17,700	18.87	17	59.15
Muzaffargarh	PP-271	Muzaffargarh-IV	Mansoor Ahmed Khan	PTI	26,051	24.95	Muhammad Aamir Karamat	ARP	18,554	17.77	7,497	55.24
Muzaffargarh	PP-272	Muzaffargarh-V	Syed Basit Sultan Bukhari	PTI	23,649	26.37	Muhammad Zia Ullah Khan	PTI	18,227	20.32	5,422	56.88
Muzaffargarh	PP-273	Muzaffargarh-VI	Muhammad Sibtain Raza	PTI	36,369	34.39	Rasool Baksh Khan	IND	24,572	23.23	11,797	60.23
Muzaffargarh	PP-274	Muzaffargarh-VII	Muhammad Raza Hussain Bukhari	PTI	27,858	32.36	Muhammad Nawab Khan Gopang	IND	26,181	30.41	1,677	60.90
Muzaffargarh	PP-275	Muzaffargarh-VIII	Khurrum Sohail Khan Laghari	IND	48,957	46.40	Abdul Qayyum Khan Jatoi	IND	33,954	32.18	15,003	59.22
Muzaffargarh	PP-276	Muzaffargarh-IX	Muhammad Aown Hamid	PTI	32,154	33.81	Muhammad Jamil Ahmed Shah	PPP	24,885	26.17	7,269	59.98
Muzaffargarh	PP-277	Muzaffargarh-X	Mian Alamdar Abbas Qureshi	IND	34,314	32.95	Muhammad Iqbal Khan	IND	30,798	29.57	3,516	64.59
Muzaffargarh	PP-278	Muzaffargarh-XI	Niaz Hussain Khan	PTI	28,341	28.09	Muhammad Zeeshan Gurmani	IND	23,040	22.84	5,301	61.95
Muzaffargarh	PP-279	Muzaffargarh-XII	Muhammad Ashraf khan Rind	PTI	42,606	42.68	Ahmad Yar	PML(N)	24,729	24.77	17,877	62.49
Layyah	PP-280	Layyah-I	Malik Ahmad Ali Aulakh	IND	37,840	31.05	Muhammad Athar Maqbool	PTI	32,259	26.47	5,581	62.50
Layyah	PP-281	Layyah-II	Sardar Shahab-ud-Din Khan	PTI	33,203	30.91	Malik Abdul Shakoor	PML(N)	30,209	28.12	2,994	62.31
Layyah	PP-282	Layyah-III	Muhammad Tahir Randhawa	IND	37,774	35.99	Qaisar Abbas Khan Magsi	PTI	27,179	25.89	10,595	64.36
Layyah	PP-283	Layyah-IV	Mahar Ijaz Ahmad Achlana	PML(N)	46,405	41.13	Sajjad Hussain Khan	PTI	44,180	39.16	2,225	67.16
Layyah	PP-284	Layyah-V	Syed Rafaqat Ali Gillani	IND	33,062	29.32	Hashim Hussain	IND	19,654	17.43	13,408	63.59
Dera Ghazi Khan	PP-285	Dera Ghazi Khan-I	Khawaja Muhammad Dawood Sulemani	PTI	27,884	30.86	Sardar Meer Badshah Khan	IND	26,172	28.97	1,712	52.05
Dera Ghazi Khan	PP-286	Dera Ghazi Khan-II	Usman Buzdar	PTI	27,027	35.33	Nizam ul Mahmood	IND	18,686	24.43	8,341	53.25
Dera Ghazi Khan	PP-287	Dera Ghazi Khan-III	Javed Akhtar Khan Lund	PTI	42,847	52.91	Mohsin Atta Khan Khosa	IND	33,716	41.63	9,131	53.87
Dera Ghazi Khan	PP-288	Dera Ghazi Khan-IV	Mohsin Atta Khan Khosa	IND	39,490	51.14	Muhammad Saif-ud-Din Khosa	PTI	30,164	39.06	9,326	49.76
Dera Ghazi Khan	PP-289	Dera Ghazi Khan-V	Hanif Khan Pitafi	IND	35,419	37.28	Shaheena Karim	PTI	18,536	19.51	16,883	49.28
Dera Ghazi Khan	PP-290	Dera Ghazi Khan-VI	Jamal Leghari	PTI	32,105	35.63	Ahmad Khan Leghari	PML(N)	28,470	31.60	3,635	52.18
Dera Ghazi Khan	PP-291	Dera Ghazi Khan-VII	Muhammad Mohiuddin Khosa	PTI	42,161	46.29	Mehmood Qadir Khan	PML(N)	40,040	43.97	2,121	58.45
Dera Ghazi Khan	PP-292	Dera Ghazi Khan-VIII	Sardar Muhammad Khan Laghari	PTI	32,316	46.87	Awais Leghari	PML(N)	32,104	46.56	212	50.82
Rajanpur	PP-293	Rajanpur-I	Muhammad Mohsin Khan Leghari	PTI	45,146	44.23	Sardar Sher Ali Gorchani	IND	33,505	32.83	11,641	55.20
Rajanpur	PP-294	Rajanpur-II	Hasnain Bahadar Dreshak	PTI	41,618	42.25	Akhtar Hassan Gorchani	IND	26,539	26.94	15,079	56.48
Rajanpur	PP-295	Rajanpur-III	Farooq Amanullah Dreshak	PTI	49,427	47.23	Parvez Iqbal Gorchani	IND	37,766	36.08	11,661	62.40
Rajanpur	PP-296	Rajanpur-IV	Muhammad Tariq Dreshak	PTI	42,190	39.44	Sardar Muhammad Yousuf	IND	27,174	25.40	15,016	62.72
Rajanpur	PP-297	Rajanpur-V	Dost Muhammad Mazari	PTI	56,579	57.97	Sardar Atif Khan Mazari	PML(N)	37,468	38.39	19,111	62.64

=== Members elected on Reserved seats ===
Reserved Seats	Party	Member
For Women	Pakistan Tehreek-e-Insaf	Yasmin Rashid
For Women	Pakistan Tehreek-e-Insaf	Sadiqa Sahibdad
For Women	Pakistan Tehreek-e-Insaf	Shamsa Ali
For Women	Pakistan Tehreek-e-Insaf	Nasrin Tariq
For Women	Pakistan Tehreek-e-Insaf	Shawana Bashir
For Women	Pakistan Tehreek-e-Insaf	Shamim Aftab
For Women	Pakistan Tehreek-e-Insaf	Firdous Rahna
For Women	Pakistan Tehreek-e-Insaf	Shahida Ahmed
For Women	Pakistan Tehreek-e-Insaf	Sumaira Ahmed
For Women	Pakistan Tehreek-e-Insaf	Syeda Zehra Naqvi
For Women	Pakistan Tehreek-e-Insaf	Ayesha Iqbal
For Women	Pakistan Tehreek-e-Insaf	Neelum Hayat Malik
For Women	Pakistan Tehreek-e-Insaf	Umul Banin Ali
For Women	Pakistan Tehreek-e-Insaf	Uzma Kardar
For Women	Pakistan Tehreek-e-Insaf	Musarrat Jamshed
For Women	Pakistan Tehreek-e-Insaf	Saadia Sohail Rana
For Women	Pakistan Tehreek-e-Insaf	Rashida Khanum
For Women	Pakistan Tehreek-e-Insaf	Farhat Farooq
For Women	Pakistan Tehreek-e-Insaf	Shaheen Raza
For Women	Pakistan Tehreek-e-Insaf	Talat Fatemeh Naqvi
For Women	Pakistan Tehreek-e-Insaf	Shaheena Karim
For Women	Pakistan Tehreek-e-Insaf	Asia Amjad
For Women	Pakistan Tehreek-e-Insaf	Seemabia Tahir
For Women	Pakistan Tehreek-e-Insaf	Momina Waheed
For Women	Pakistan Tehreek-e-Insaf	Aisha Nawaz
For Women	Pakistan Tehreek-e-Insaf	Zainab Umair
For Women	Pakistan Tehreek-e-Insaf	Farah Agha
For Women	Pakistan Tehreek-e-Insaf	Syed Farah Azmi
For Women	Pakistan Tehreek-e-Insaf	Sajida Begum
For Women	Pakistan Tehreek-e-Insaf	Sajida Yousaf
For Women	Pakistan Tehreek-e-Insaf	Shabeen Gul Khan
For Women	Pakistan Tehreek-e-Insaf	Sabrina Javaid
For Women	Pakistan Tehreek-e-Insaf	Abida Bibi
For Women	Pakistan Muslim League (N)	Zakia Shahnawaz Khan
For Women	Pakistan Muslim League (N)	Mehwish Sultana
For Women	Pakistan Muslim League (N)	Azma Zahid Bukhari
For Women	Pakistan Muslim League (N)	Begum Ishrat Ashraf
For Women	Pakistan Muslim League (N)	Sadia Nadeem Malik
For Women	Pakistan Muslim League (N)	Hina Pervaiz Butt
For Women	Pakistan Muslim League (N)	Sania Ashiq
For Women	Pakistan Muslim League (N)	Tahia Noon
For Women	Pakistan Muslim League (N)	Uswah Aftab
For Women	Pakistan Muslim League (N)	Saba Sadiq
For Women	Pakistan Muslim League (N)	Kanwal Pervaiz
For Women	Pakistan Muslim League (N)	Gulnaz Shahzadi
For Women	Pakistan Muslim League (N)	Rabia Nusrat
For Women	Pakistan Muslim League (N)	Haseena Begum
For Women	Pakistan Muslim League (N)	Rahat Afza
For Women	Pakistan Muslim League (N)	Munira Yamin Satti
For Women	Pakistan Muslim League (N)	Rukhsana Kausar
For Women	Pakistan Muslim League (N)	Salma Saadia Taimoor
For Women	Pakistan Muslim League (N)	Khalida Mansoor
For Women	Pakistan Muslim League (N)	Rabia Ahmed Butt
For Women	Pakistan Muslim League (N)	Rabia Naseem Farooqi
For Women	Pakistan Muslim League (N)	Faiza Mushtaq
For Women	Pakistan Muslim League (N)	Bushra Anjum Butt
For Women	Pakistan Muslim League (N)	Uzma Qadri
For Women	Pakistan Muslim League (N)	Sumera Komal
For Women	Pakistan Muslim League (N)	Raheela Naeem
For Women	Pakistan Muslim League (N)	Sumbal Malik Hussain
For Women	Pakistan Muslim League (N)	Aneeza Fatima
For Women	Pakistan Muslim League (N)	Nafisa Ameen
For Women	Pakistan Muslim League (N)	Zaib un Nisa Awan
For Women	Pakistan Muslim League (Q)	Basma Riaz Choudhry
For Women	Pakistan Muslim League (Q)	Khadija Umar
For Women	Pakistan Peoples Party	Shazia Abid
For Non-Muslims	Pakistan Tehreek-e-Insaf	Haroon Imran Gill
For Non-Muslims	Pakistan Tehreek-e-Insaf	Ijaz Masih
For Non-Muslims	Pakistan Tehreek-e-Insaf	Mahindar Pall Singh
For Non-Muslims	Pakistan Tehreek-e-Insaf	Peter Gill
For Non-Muslims	Pakistan Muslim League (N)	Khalil Tahir Sandhu
For Non-Muslims	Pakistan Muslim League (N)	Joyce Rofin Julius
For Non-Muslims	Pakistan Muslim League (N)	Munir Masih Khokhar
For Non-Muslims	Pakistan Muslim League (N)	Tariq Masih Gill

== See also ==
- 2022 Punjab provincial by-election
