= Khokhar Zer =

- Location in Pakistan
- Coordinates: 32°49′06.8″N 72°50′55.5″E
- Country: Pakistan
- Province: Punjab
- District: Chakwal District
- Religion: ISLAM
- Time zone: UTC+5 (PST)
  - Summer (DST): +6

Khokhar Zer is a village of Chakwal District in the Punjab province of Pakistan. It is part of Chakwal Tehsil and also of Khokhar Zair Union council, to which the villages of Junga, Shamsabad, Khai and Khokhar Zair belong. It is located 18 km south of Chakwal city through Choa Road. It is surrounded by Khokhar Bala, Dharyala Kahoon, Waryamal, Shamsabad, and Janga. It is believed to be the largest village of "Dhan Chorasi" with a population of more than 10,000 people.

The inhabitants of Khokhar Zer speak Dhani.

There are two educational institutes in the village, a Government High School for girls and a Government High School for boys. There is also a private school named "Crescent Public School" (mohahlla Bhatti) and Air born School in the village. The village was very famous for its "Madrasa" in the early 40s. Mostly every house this village has a Hafiz (Ma'Sha'Allah) The Hafiz of this village served whole Punjab for Traveeh in Ramdan Kareem. Ex Khateeb-e-Pakistan (Imam of Badshahi Mosque) Maulana Abdur Rehman Jami, Professor Abdur Razzaq of Silsila Naqshbandia Awaisia (author of famous book Tasawwuf Aur T'amir-e-Sirat), Engr Babu Muhammad Rafique Janjua OGDCL, Major General Retd Hafiz Masroor Ahmed Bhutta and Air Commodore (Retired) Tariq Mahmud Ashraf ex Defence Attaché and Assistant Chief of the Air Staff (Operations) and current member Provincial Assembly Ms. Asia Amjad of Pakistan Tehreek-i-Insaf belongs to Khokhar Zer.

The village holds the Basic Health Unit - BHU (Bunyadi Markz-e- Sehat). There are two dams in the village known as Khokhar Zer Dam & Surlah Dam.

== Gallery ==
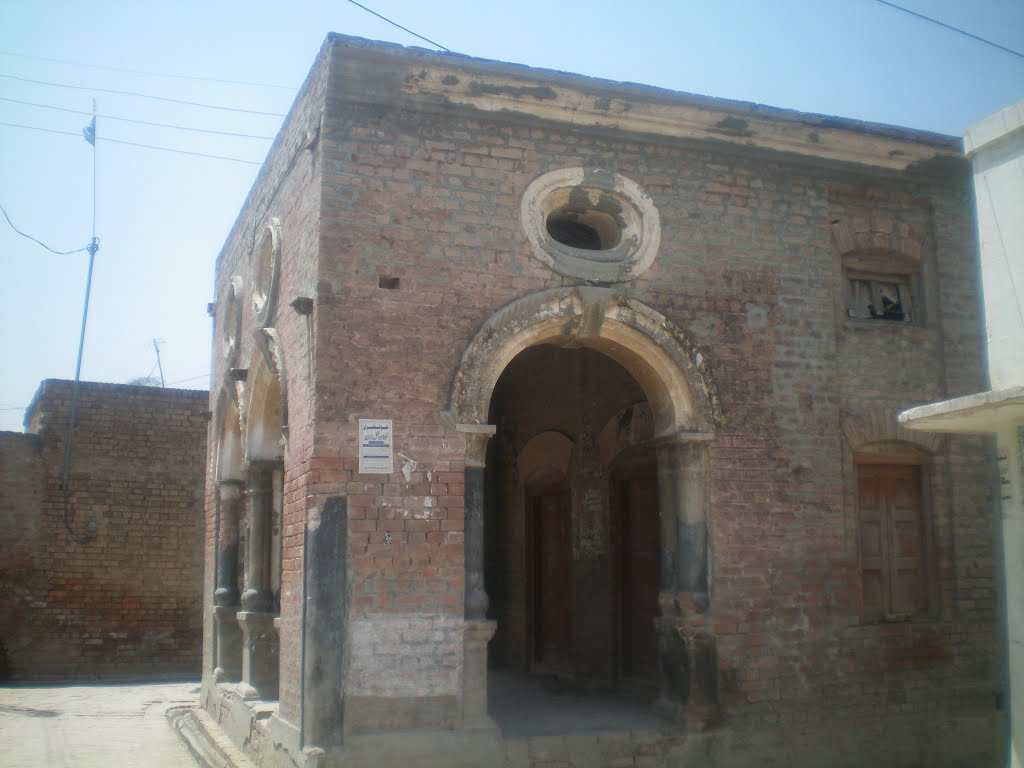
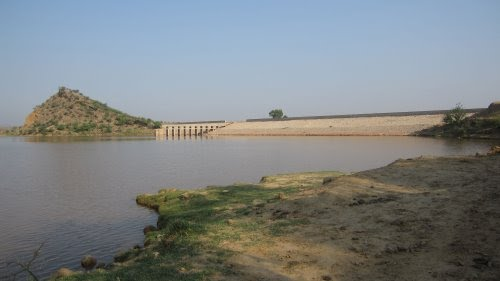
