= Muhammad Saleem Akhtar =

Pakistani politician

Member of the Provincial Assembly of the Punjab
- In office 15 August 2018 – 14 January 2023
- Constituency: PP-212 Multan-II

Personal details
- Party: PML(Q) (2025-present)
- Other political affiliations: IPP (2023-2025); PTI (2018-2023)

Muhammad Saleem Akhtar is a Pakistani politician who had been a member of the Provincial Assembly of the Punjab from August 2018 till January 2023.

== Early life and education ==
He was born on 14 June 1953 in Multan, Pakistan.

He has degree of Bachelor of Arts and Bachelor of Laws.

== Political career ==
He was elected to the Provincial Assembly of the Punjab as a candidate of the Pakistan Tehreek-e-Insaf (PTI) from PP-212 (Multan-II) in the 2018 Punjab provincial election.
