= Ansar Majeed Khan Niazi =

Pakistani politician

Provincial Minister of Punjab for Labour and Human Resource
- In office 27 August 2018 – 10 April 2022

Member of the Provincial Assembly of the Punjab
- In office 15 August 2018 – 14 January 2023
- Constituency: PP-78 Sargodha-VII

Personal details
- Party: PTI (2018-present)

Ansar Majeed Khan Niazi is a Pakistani politician born on 23 September 1982 who was the Provincial Minister of Punjab for Labour and Human Resource, in office from 27 August 2018 till April 2022. He had been a member of the Provincial Assembly of the Punjab from August 2018 till January 2023.

== Education ==
He has received master level education much like B.B.A in early 2005.

== Political career ==
Mr. Niazi ran from the seat of Provincial Assembly of Punjab from PP-35 Sargodha as a candidate of Pakistan Tehreek-e-Insaf but was unsuccessful. He was elected to the Provincial Assembly of the Punjab as a candidate of the Pakistan Tehreek-e-Insaf (PTI) from PP-78 (Sargodha-VII) in the 2018 Punjab provincial election.

On 27 August 2018, he was inducted into the provincial Punjab cabinet of Chief Minister Sardar Usman Buzdar and was appointed the Provincial Minister of Punjab for Labor and Human Resource. He was also an ex-officio Chairman Governing Body Punjab Employees Social Security Institution.
