= Peter Gill (politician) =

Pakistani politician (died 2021)

Provincial Assembly of Punjab
- In office 15 August 2018 – 15 October 2021
- Constituency: Reserved seat for minorities

Personal details
- Party: PTI (2018-2021)

Peter Gill (Urdu: پیٹر گِل; died 8 October 2021) was a Pakistani politician who was elected member for the Provincial Assembly of Punjab.

== Political career ==
He was elected to Provincial Assembly of Punjab on a reserved seat for minorities in the 2018 Pakistani general election representing Pakistan Tehreek-e-Insaf.
