= Sarfraz Hussain =

Pakistani politician

Member of the Provincial Assembly of the Punjab
- In office 15 August 2018 – 14 January 2023
- Constituency: PP-173 Lahore-XXX

Personal details
- Party: PTI (2018-present)

Sarfraz Hussain is a Pakistani politician who had been a member of the Provincial Assembly of the Punjab from August 2018 till January 2023.

== Political career ==
He was elected to the Provincial Assembly of the Punjab as a candidate of the Pakistan Tehreek-e-Insaf (PTI) from PP-173 (Lahore-XXX) in the 2018 Punjab provincial election.

He ran for a seat in the Provincial Assembly from PP-166 Lahore-XXIII as a candidate of the PTI in the 2024 Punjab provincial election.
