= Khawaja Muhammad Dawood Sulemani =

Pakistani politician

Member of the Provincial Assembly of the Punjab
- In office 15 August 2018 – 14 January 2023
- Constituency: PP-285 (Dera Ghazi Khan-I)

Personal details
- Party: PTI

Khawaja Muhammad Dawood Sulemani is a Pakistani politician who had been a member of the Provincial Assembly of the Punjab from August 2018 till January 2023.

== Political career ==
He was elected to the Provincial Assembly of the Punjab as a candidate of the Pakistan Tehreek-e-Insaf (PTI) from PP-285 (Dera Ghazi Khan-I) in the 2018 Punjab provincial election.

He ran for a seat in the Provincial Assembly from PP-285 Dera Ghazi Khan-I as a candidate of the PTI in the 2024 Punjab provincial election.
