= Muhammad Ejaz Hussain =

Pakistani politician

Member of the Provincial Assembly of the Punjab
- In office 15 August 2018 – 14 January 2023
- Constituency: PP-232 Vehari-IV

Personal details
- Born: 25 October 1978 (age 47)
- Party: PTI (2018-present)

Muhammad Ejaz Hussain (born 25 October 1978) is a Pakistani politician and lawyer who had been a member of the Provincial Assembly of the Punjab from August 2018 till January 2023.

== Early life and education ==
Hussain was born on 25 October 1978 into a political family, as both his father Chaudhry Ranjha Khan and his uncle Muhammad Ayub were politicians.

He obtained his LLB in 2003 from the International Islamic University, Islamabad.

== Political career ==
He was elected to the Provincial Assembly of the Punjab as a candidate of the Pakistan Tehreek-e-Insaf from PP-232 (Vehari-IV) in the 2018 Punjab provincial election.

He ran for a seat in the Provincial Assembly from PP-232 Vehari-IV as a candidate of the PTI in the 2023 Punjab provincial election.
