= Mian Muhammad Atif =

Pakistani politician

Member of the Provincial Assembly of the Punjab
- In office 15 August 2018 – 14 January 2023
- Constituency: PP-132 Nankana Sahib-II

Personal details
- Party: PTI (since 2018)

Mian Muhammad Atif is a Pakistani politician who was member of the Provincial Assembly of the Punjab, from August 2018 to January 2023.

Atif was elected to the Provincial Assembly of the Punjab as a candidate of the Pakistan Tehreek-e-Insaf (PTI) from PP-132 (Nankana Sahib-II) in the 2018 Punjab provincial election.

Atif ran for a seat in the Provincial Assembly from PP-132 Nankana Sahib-II as a candidate of the PTI in the 2024 Punjab provincial election.
