= Muhammad Farrukh Mumtaz Maneka =

Pakistani politician

Member of the Provincial Assembly of the Punjab
- In office 15 August 2018 – 14 January 2023
- Constituency: PP-191 Pakpattan-I

Personal details
- Party: TLP (2025–present)
- Other political affiliations: PTI (2018–2025)

Muhammad Farrukh Mumtaz Maneka is a Pakistani politician who had been a member of the Provincial Assembly of the Punjab from August 2018 till January 2023.

== Political career ==
He was elected to the Provincial Assembly of the Punjab as a candidate of the Pakistan Tehreek-e-Insaf (PTI) from PP-191 (Pakpattan-I) in the 2018 Punjab provincial election.

He ran for a seat in the Provincial Assembly from PP-192 Pakpattan-II as a candidate of the PTI in the 2024 Punjab provincial election.
