= Amjad Mehmood Chaudhry =

Pakistani politician

Hajj Ch Amjad Mehmood

Member of the Provincial Assembly of the Punjab
- In office 15 August 2018 – 14 January 2023
- Constituency: PP-13 Rawalpindi-VIII

Personal details
- Born: 7 April 1960 (age 66) Rawalpindi, Punjab, Pakistan
- Other political affiliations: PTI (2011) present

Amjad Mehmood Chaudhry is a Pakistani politician and businessman who had been a member of the Provincial Assembly of the Punjab from August 2018 until January 2023.

== Early life and education ==
He was born on 7 April 1960 in Rawalpindi, Pakistan.

He has received middle-level education.

== Political career ==
He was elected to the Provincial Assembly of the Punjab as a candidate of the Pakistan Tehreek-e-Insaf (PTI) from PP-13 Rawalpindi-VIII in the 2018 Punjab provincial election.

He ran for a seat in the Provincial Assembly from PP-13 Rawalpindi-VIII as a candidate of the PTI in the 2023 Punjab provincial election.

== Assets ==
In 2019, he was the second richest MPA from Punjab, his declared assets comprising a net wealth of Rs 1.48 billion, including commercial, residential and agricultural properties in Islamabad, Lahore and Karachi.
