= Mohsin Atta Khan Khosa =

Pakistani politician

Member of the Provincial Assembly of the Punjab
- In office 15 August 2018 – 21 May 2022
- Constituency: PP-288 Dera Ghazi Khan-I

Personal details
- Born: 8 September 1960 (age 65)
- Party: Pakistan Muslim League (N) (since 2022)
- Other political affiliations: Pakistan Tehreek-e-Insaf (2018-2022)

Mohsin Atta Khan Khosa is a Pakistani politician who had been a member of the Provincial Assembly of the Punjab from August 2018 to a May 2022.

== Political career ==
He was elected to the Provincial Assembly of the Punjab as an independent candidate from Constituency PP-288 (Dera Ghazi Khan-IV) in 2018 Pakistani general election. Following his successful election, he joined Pakistan Tehreek-e-Insaf (PTI). He de-seated due to vote against party policy for Chief Minister of Punjab election on 16 April 2022.
