= Munira Yamin Satti =

Pakistani politician (died 2021)

Member of the Provincial Assembly of the Punjab
- In office 15 August 2018 – 7 January 2021
- Constituency: Reserved seat for women

Personal details
- Died: 7 January 2021
- Party: Pakistan Muslim League (N)

Munira Yamin Satti (died 7 January 2021) was a Pakistani politician who had been a member of the Provincial Assembly of the Punjab from 15 August 2018 to 7 January 2021.

== Political career ==
She was elected to the Provincial Assembly of the Punjab as a candidate of Pakistan Muslim League (N) (PML-N) on a reserved seat for women in the 2018 Pakistani general election.

== Death ==
She died on 7 January 2021, due to COVID-19, during the COVID-19 pandemic in Pakistan.
