= Chaudhry Muhammad Shafiq Anwar =

Pakistani politician

Member of the Provincial Assembly of the Punjab
- In office 15 August 2018 – 14 January 2023
- Constituency: PP-267 Rahim Yar Khan-XIII

Personal details
- Party: PMLN

Chaudhry Muhammad Shafiq Anwar is a Pakistani politician who had been a member of the Provincial Assembly of the Punjab from August 2018 till January 2023.

== Political career ==
He was elected to the Provincial Assembly of the Punjab record 5th consecutive time as a candidate of Pakistan Muslim League (N) from Constituency PP-267 (Rahim Yar Khan-XIII) in the 2018 Pakistani general election.
