= Chaudhry Kashif Mahmood =

Pakistani politician

Member of the Provincial Assembly of the Punjab
- In office 15 August 2018 – 26 July 2022
- Constituency: PP-241 (Bahawalnagar-V)

Personal details
- Party: PMLN

Chaudhry Kashif Mahmood is a Pakistani politician who had been a member of the Provincial Assembly of the Punjab from August 2018 till July 2022.

== Political career ==
He was elected to the Provincial Assembly of the Punjab as a candidate of Pakistan Muslim League (N) from Constituency PP-241 (Bahawalnagar-V) in the 2018 Pakistani general election.

The Islamabad High Court disqualified Mehmood as he possessed a fake degree on 31 January 2021. The Supreme Court of Pakistan upheld this decision on 24 November 2021 and then dismissed a review petition by Mehmood in July 2022. The Election Commission of Pakistan de-notified Mehmood on 26 July 2022 and he ceased to be an MPA.

He was made a political secretary to the Prime Minister on 22 August 2022.
