= Sabeen Gul Khan =

Pakistani politician

Member of the Provincial Assembly of the Punjab
- In office 15 August 2018 – 14 January 2023
- Constituency: Reserved seat for women

Personal details
- Other political affiliations: PTI (2018–present)

Sabeen Gul Khan is a Pakistani politician who had been a member of the Provincial Assembly of the Punjab from August 2018 till January 2023.

== Political career ==
She belongs to Pakistan's Punjab province, North Punjab, from Multan district. Before MPA, she was District President Women on behalf of PTI in Multan in 2013. In 2016, she was selected as a member of the Municipal Corporation from district Multan. In 2018, she became a member of provincial assembly. She was elected to the Provincial Assembly of the Punjab as a candidate of Pakistan Tehreek-e-Insaf (PTI) on a reserved seat for women in the 2018 Pakistani general election.
