= Haroon Imran Gill =

Pakistani politician

Member of the Provincial Assembly of Punjab
- In office 15 August 2018 – 21 May 2022
- Constituency: Reserved seat for minorities

Personal details
- Other political affiliations: PTI (2018-2022)

Haroon Imran Gill (Urdu: ہارون عمران گِل) is a Pakistani politician who was elected member for the Provincial Assembly of Punjab from August 2018 to May 2022.

== Political career ==
He was elected to Provincial Assembly of Punjab on a reserved seat for minorities in the 2018 Pakistani general election representing Pakistan Tehreek-e-Insaf. He de-seated due to vote against party policy for Chief Minister of Punjab election on 16 April 2022.
