= Munir Masih Khokhar =

Pakistani politician

Member of the Provincial Assembly of Punjab
- Incumbent
- Assumed office 27 February 2024
- Constituency: Reserved seat for minorities

Personal details
- Party: PMLN (2024-present)

Munir Masih Khokhar (Urdu: منیر مسیح کھوکھر) is a Pakistani politician who was elected member for the Provincial Assembly of Punjab.

== Political career ==
He was elected to Provincial Assembly of Punjab on a reserved seat for minorities in the 2018 Pakistani general election representing Pakistan Muslim League (N).
