= Aman Ullah Warraich =

Pakistani politician

Member of the Provincial Assembly of the Punjab
- In office 15 August 2018 – 14 January 2023
- Constituency: PP-62 Gujranwala-XII

Personal details
- Party: PMLN

Haji Aman Ullah Warraich is a Pakistani politician who had been a Member of the Provincial Assembly of the Punjab from August 2018 till January 2023.

== Political career ==
He was elected to the Provincial Assembly of the Punjab as a candidate of Pakistan Muslim League (N) from Constituency PP-62 (Gujranwala-XII) in the 2018 Pakistani general election.

1991. Was elected as Member Zilla Council Gujranwala.

1996. Was elected as Member District council Gujranwala.
