= Saadia Sohail Rana =

Pakistani politician

Member of the Provincial Assembly of the Punjab
- In office 18 August 2018 – 12 January 2023
- Constituency: Reserved seat for women
- In office 29 May 2013 – 31 May 2018
- Constituency: Reserved seat for women

Personal details
- Born: 23 April 1965 (age 61) Lahore, Punjab, Pakistan
- Party: PPP (2025-present)
- Other political affiliations: IPP (2023-2025); PTI (2013-2023)

Saadia Sohail Rana (Urdu: سعدیہ سہیل رانا; born 23 April 1965) is a Pakistani politician who was a Member of the Provincial Assembly of the Punjab, from May 2013 to May 2018.

== Early life and education ==
She was born on 23 April 1965 in Lahore.

She has the degree of Bachelor of Arts.

== Political career ==
She was elected to the Provincial Assembly of the Punjab as a candidate of Pakistan Tehreek-e-Insaf (PTI) on a reserved seat for women in the 2013 Pakistani general election.

She was re-elected to the Provincial Assembly of the Punjab as a candidate of PTI on a reserved seat for women in the 2018 Pakistani general election.
