= Chaudhry Muhammad Jameel =

Pakistani politician

Member of the Provincial Assembly of the Punjab
- In office 15 August 2018 – 14 January 2023
- Constituency: PP-240 Bahawalnagar-IV

Personal details
- Party: PMLN

Muhammad Jameel is a Pakistani politician who served as a member of the Provincial Assembly of the Punjab from Constituency PP-240 Bahawalnagar-IV.

== Early life ==
Mr. Muhammad Jamil son of Mr. Jan Muhammad was born on February 4, 1964, at Chishtian. He remained vice chairman, Union Council during 1987; member, District Council Bahawalnagar during 1991 and member Provincial Assembly of the Punjab during 1997-99. He is an agriculturist and a businessman.

== Political career ==
He was elected to the Provincial Assembly of the Punjab as a candidate of the Pakistan Muslim League (N) from Constituency PP-240 (Bahawalnagar-IV) in the 2018 Pakistani general election.
