= Sheikh Ijaz Ahmad =

Pakistani politician

Member of the Provincial Assembly of the Punjab
- In office 29 May 2013 – 31 May 2018

Personal details
- Born: 20 June 1969 (age 57) Faisalabad
- Party: Pakistan Muslim League (N)

Sheikh Ijaz Ahmad is a Pakistani politician who was a Member of the Provincial Assembly of the Punjab, from 2002 to 2007 and again from May 2013 to May 2018.

== Early life and education ==
He was born on 20 June 1969 in Faisalabad.

He received a degree of Bachelor of Arts and a degree of Bachelor of Laws, both from the University of Punjab.

== Political career ==
He was elected to the Provincial Assembly of the Punjab as a candidate of Pakistan Muslim League (N) (PML-N) from Constituency PP-72 (Faisalabad-XXII) in the 2002 Pakistani general election. He received 20,586 votes and defeated a candidate of Pakistan Peoples Party (PPP).

He was re-elected to the Provincial Assembly of the Punjab as a candidate of PML-N from Constituency PP-68 (Faisalabad-XVIII) in the 2013 Pakistani general election.
