= Mahar Muhammad Fayyaz =

Pakistani politician

Member of the Provincial Assembly of the Punjab
- In office 2008 – 31 May 2018

Personal details
- Born: 20 September 1965 (age 61) Dina, Pakistan
- Party: Pakistan Muslim League (N)

Mahar Muhammad Fayyaz is a Pakistani politician who was a Member of the Provincial Assembly of the Punjab, from 2008 to May 2018.

== Early life and education ==
He was born on 20 September 1965 in Dina in Mahar Gujjar Family.

He graduated from University of the Punjab and has the degree of Bachelor of Arts.

== Political career ==
He ran for the seat of the Provincial Assembly of the Punjab as a candidate of Pakistan Muslim League (N) (PML-N) from Constituency PP-25 (Jhelum-II) in the 2002 Pakistani general election, but was unsuccessful. He 31,052 votes and lost the seat to Chaudhry Tasneem Nasir, a candidate of Pakistan Muslim League (Q) (PML-Q).

He was elected to the Provincial Assembly of the Punjab as a candidate of PML-N from Constituency PP-25 (Jhelum-II) in the 2008 Pakistani general election. He received 46,015 votes and defeated Chaudhary Qurban Hussain, a candidate of PML-Q.

He was re-elected to the Provincial Assembly of the Punjab as a candidate of PML-N from Constituency PP-25 (Jhelum-II) in the 2013 Pakistani general election. He received 48,594 votes and defeated Abid Hussain, a candidate of Pakistan Tehreek-e-Insaf (PTI).
