= Rashida Khanum =

Pakistani politician

Member of the Provincial Assembly of the Punjab
- In office 15 August 2018 – 14 January 2023
- Constituency: Reserved seat for women

Personal details
- Party: PTI (2018-present)

Rashida Khanum is a Pakistani politician who served as a member of the Provincial Assembly of the Punjab from August 2018 to January 2023.

== Political career ==
She was elected to the Provincial Assembly of the Punjab as a candidate of Pakistan Tehreek-e-Insaf (PTI) on a reserved seat for women in the 2018 Pakistani general election. She is a member of six governmental committees namely Labour and Human Resource, Primary and Secondary Healthcare, Mines and Minerals, Revenue, Relief and Consolidation in Pakistan.
