= Muhammad Ansar Iqbal =

Member of the Provincial Assembly of Punjab
- In office 24 February 2024 – 5 August 2025
- Constituency: PP-73 Sargodha-III

Personal details
- Party: PTI (2024-present)

Muhammad Ansar Iqbal is a Pakistani politician who had been a Member of the Provincial Assembly of the Punjab from February 2024 to August 2025.

== Political career ==
He was elected to the Provincial Assembly of the Punjab as a Pakistan Tehreek-e-Insaf-backed independent candidate from constituency PP-73 Sargodha-III in the 2024 Pakistani general election.

On 31 July 2025, Iqbal and 195 others were convicted by a court in Faisalabad and sentenced to up to 10 years' imprisonment over the 2023 Pakistani protests. On 5 August 2025, Election Commission of Pakistan disqualified him due to his conviction.
