= Mian Kamran Muhammad Abdullah =

Pakistani politician

Mian Kamran Muhammad Abdullah is a Pakistani politician who has been a Member of the Provincial Assembly of the Punjab since 2024.

== Political career ==
He was elected to the Provincial Assembly of the Punjab as a candidate of the Pakistan People's Party (PPP) from constituency PP-221 Multan-IX in the 2024 Pakistani general election.
