= Adil Buksh Chattha =

Pakistani politician

Member of the Provincial Assembly of the Punjab
- In office 15 August 2018 – 14 January 2023
- Constituency: PP-52 Gujranwala-II

Personal details
- Born: Chaudhry Adil Buksh Chattha
- Party: PMLN

Chaudhry Adil Buksh Chattha is a Pakistani politician who had been a Member of the Provincial Assembly of the Punjab from August 2018 till January 2023.

== Political career ==
He was elected to the Provincial Assembly of the Punjab as a candidate of Pakistan Muslim League (N) from Constituency PP-52 (Gujranwala-II) in the 2018 Pakistani general election.
