= Malik Umar Farooq =

Pakistani politician

Member of the Provincial Assembly of the Punjab
- In office September 2016 – 31 May 2018

Personal details
- Party: PMLN 2018 present

Malik Umer Faruq is a Pakistani politician who was a Member of the Provincial Assembly of the Punjab, from September 2016 to May 2018.

== Political career ==
He was elected to the Provincial Assembly of the Punjab as a candidate of Pakistan Muslim League (Nawaz) from Constituency PP-7 (Rawalpindi-VII) in by polls held in September 2016.
