= Gulnaz Shahzadi =

Pakistani politician

Member of the Provincial Assembly of the Punjab
- In office 29 May 2013 – 31 May 2018
- Constituency: Reserved seat for women

Personal details
- Born: 18 April 1968 (age 58) Lahore, Punjab, Pakistan
- Party: PMLN

Gulnaz Shahzadi (Urdu: گلناز شہزادی; born 18 April 1968) is a Pakistani politician who was a Member of the Provincial Assembly of the Punjab, from May 2013 to May 2018.

== Early life and education ==
She was born on 18 April 1968 in Lahore.

She earned a Bachelor of Science in Chemistry, Zoology and Botany in 1987. She received Bachelor of Education from the University of the Punjab in 1989.

== Political career ==
She was elected to the Provincial Assembly of the Punjab as a candidate of Pakistan Muslim League (N) (PML-N) on a reserved seat for women in the 2013 Pakistani general election.

She was re-elected to the Provincial Assembly of the Punjab as a candidate of PML-N on a reserved seat for women in the 2018 Pakistani general election.

On 13 May 2024, the Election Commission of Pakistan (ECP) suspended her membership as a member of the National Assembly. This action followed a Supreme Court of Pakistan decision to suspend the verdict of the Peshawar High Court, which had denied the allocation of a reserved seat to the PTI-Sunni Ittehad Council bloc.
