= Malik Ghulam Rasool Sangha =

Pakistani politician

Member of the Provincial Assembly of the Punjab
- In office 15 August 2018 – 21 May 2022
- Constituency: PP-83 (Khushab-II)

Personal details
- Party: IPP (2023-present)
- Other political affiliations: PMLN (2022-2023); PTI (2018-2022)

Malik Ghulam Rasool Sangha is a Pakistani politician who had been a member of the Provincial Assembly of the Punjab from August 2018 to May 2022.

== Political career ==
He was elected to the Provincial Assembly of the Punjab as an independent candidate from Constituency PP-83 (Khushab-II) in the 2018 Pakistani general election.

He joined Pakistan Tehreek-e-Insaf (PTI) following his election. He was unseated due to a vote against party policy for the Chief Minister of Punjab election on 16 April 2022.
