= Sabrina Javaid =

Pakistani politician

Member of the Provincial Assembly of the Punjab
- In office 15 August 2018 – 14 January 2023
- Constituency: Reserved seat for Women ( W 329)

Personal details
- Party: PTI (2003-present)

Sabrina Javaid is a Pakistani politician. She was a member of the Provincial Assembly of the Punjab from August 2018 till January 2023.

== Career ==
Javaid joined Tehreek e Insaf (PTI) in 2003. She started her political career from grass roots and is Master in Political Science. She was elected President of the Women's Wing of Jhelum District on 23 March 2013 in PTI Intra-party elections by Public of Jhelum District. She served on the Planning & Development Standing Committee, the Higher Education Standing Committee and Environmental & Protection Standing Committee of the Provincial Assembly of Punjab from 15 August 2018 to January 2023.

She has been on the Board of Chairman HITEC University Taxila.

Javaid was designated to be part of Pakistan Parliamentarians Delegation on the Role of Parliamentarians in Development. She has travelled to the UAE, UK, Saudi Arabia, Bangkok, Singapore, Australia, and Uganda.

She was awarded PTI party Ticket for PP24 (then PP 25) Jhelum in 2018, but had to return that as she had not filed her nomination papers in time. She was elected to the Provincial Assembly of the Punjab as a candidate of Pakistan Tehreek-e-Insaf (PTI) on a reserved seat for Women in 2018 Pakistani General election.

She brought Chinese private investment of US$5 billion for clean drinking water and sanitation and metering for Punjab, by June 2023. An agreement was signed between WASA Punjab and the Chinese private investors in March 2022. Terms were finalized on 30 November 2022. It was the only major investment in the history of Punjab in 75 years.

== Family ==
Javaid is married to Major (Retired) Javaid Inayat Khan Kayani, the daughter of Late Colonel Abdul Aziz, and the eldest daughter-in-law of Late Colonel Muhammad Inayat Khan Kayani of Pindgolandazan Tehsil Sohawa. The latter is known as a philanthropist and social worker. Her maternal grandfather, Maulvi Muhammad Hussain, was a member of the Azad Kashmir first Legislative Assembly soon after the independence of Pakistan and Finance Minister in the first Cabinet of Azad Kashmir.

She has 3 sons; one is in active service as a Lieutenant Colonel in the Pakistan Army, while 2 are professionals in their fields.
