= Bao Akhtar Ali =

Pakistani politician

Member of the Provincial Assembly of the Punjab
- In office 15 August 2018 – 14 January 2023
- Constituency: PP-154 Lahore-XI
- In office 29 May 2013 – 31 May 2018
- Constituency: PP-144 (Lahore-VIII)

Personal details
- Born: 1 January 1953 (age 73) Lahore, Punjab, Pakistan
- Other political affiliations: PMLN (2013-2025)

Bao Chaudhry Akhtar Ali is a Pakistani politician who served as a Member of the Provincial Assembly of the Punjab from May 2013 to May 2018, and again from August 2018 to January 2023.

== Early life ==
He was born on 1 January 1953.

== Political career ==
He was elected to the Provincial Assembly of the Punjab as a candidate of Pakistan Muslim League (N) (PML (N)) from Constituency PP-144 (Lahore-VIII) in the 2013 Pakistani general election. He was again elected to the Provincial Assembly of the Punjab as a candidate of PML (N) from Constituency PP-154 (Lahore-XI) in the 2018 Pakistani general election.
