= Kanwal Pervaiz =

Pakistani politician

Member of the Provincial Assembly of the Punjab
- In office 15 August 2018 – 14 January 2023
- Constituency: Reserved seat for women

Personal details
- Born: 12 September 1981 (age 45) Sialkot, Punjab, Pakistan
- Party: PMLN (2018-present)

Kanwal Pervaiz is a Pakistani politician who had been a member of the Provincial Assembly of the Punjab from August 2018 till January 2023.

== Political career ==
She was elected to the Provincial Assembly of the Punjab as a candidate of Pakistan Muslim League (N) (PML-N) on a reserved seat for women in the 2018 Pakistani general election.
