= Sadiqa Sahibdad Khan =

Pakistani politician

Sadiqa Sahibdad

Member of the Provincial Assembly of the Punjab
- In office 15 August 2018 – 14 January 2023
- Constituency: Reserved seat for women

Personal details
- Born: 7 April 1935 (age 91) Amritsar, British India
- Other political affiliations: Pakistan Tehreek-e-Insaf

Sadiqa Sahibdad Khan is a Pakistani politician who had been a member of the Provincial Assembly of the Punjab from August 2018 till January 2023.

== Early life and education ==
She was born on 7 April 1935 in Amritsar, British India.

She has received matriculation level education.

== Political career ==
She was elected to the Provincial Assembly of the Punjab as a candidate of Pakistan Tehreek-e-Insaf (PTI) on a reserved seat for women in the 2018 Pakistani general election.
