= Mian Naseer Ahmad =

Pakistani politician

Member of the Provincial Assembly of the Punjab
- In office 15 August 2018 – 14 January 2023
- Constituency: PP-163 Lahore-XX
- In office 2008 – 31 May 2018
- Constituency: PP-155 (Lahore-XIX)

Personal details
- Party: PMLN

Mian Naseer Ahmad is a Pakistani politician who was a Member of the Provincial Assembly of the Punjab, from 2008 till May 2018 and from August 2018 till January 2023.He has the degree of Master of Business Administration from ILM in Lahore.

== Political career ==
He was elected to the Provincial Assembly of the Punjab as a candidate of PML-N from Constituency PP-155 (Lahore-XIX) in the 2008 Pakistani general election. He received 33,051 votes and defeated a candidate of PPP.

He was re-elected to the Provincial Assembly of the Punjab as a candidate of PML-N from Constituency PP-155 (Lahore-XIX) in the 2013 Pakistani general election.

He was re-elected to Provincial Assembly of the Punjab as a candidate of PML-N from Constituency PP-163 (Lahore-XX) in the 2018 Pakistani general election.
