= Sadia Nadeem Malik =

Pakistani politician

Member of the Provincial Assembly of the Punjab
- In office 29 May 2013 – 31 May 2018
- Constituency: Reserved seat for women

Personal details
- Born: 1 April 1967 (age 59) Lahore, Punjab, Pakistan
- Party: PMLN

Sadia Nadeem Malik (Urdu: سعدیہ ندیم ملک; born 1 April 1967) is a Pakistani politician who was a Member of the Provincial Assembly of the Punjab, from May 2013 to May 2018.

== Early life and education ==
She was born on 1 April 1967 in Lahore.

She received the degree of Master of Arts in Political Science in 1991 from Government College, Lahore.

== Political career ==
She was elected to the Provincial Assembly of the Punjab as a candidate of Pakistan Muslim League (N) (PML-N) on a reserved seat for women in the 2013 Pakistani general election.

She was re-elected to the Provincial Assembly of the Punjab as a candidate of PML-N on a reserved seat for women in the 2018 Pakistani general election.
