= Pirzada Muhammad Jahangir Sultan =

Pakistani politician

Member of the Provincial Assembly of the Punjab
- In office 15 August 2018 – 14 January 2023
- Constituency: PP-225 Lodhran-II
- In office 29 May 2013 – 31 May 2018

Personal details
- Born: 1 January 1957 (age 69) Multan, Punjab, Pakistan
- Party: PMLN

Pirzada Muhammad Jahangir Sultan is a Pakistani politician who was a Member of the Provincial Assembly of the Punjab, from May 2013 to May 2018 and from August 2018 to January 2023.

== Early life ==
He was born on 1 January 1957 in Multan.

== Political career ==
He was elected to the Provincial Assembly of the Punjab as an independent candidate from Constituency PP-208 (Lodhran-II) in the 2013 Pakistani general election. He joined Pakistan Muslim League (N) (PML-N) in May 2013.

He was re-elected to Provincial Assembly of the Punjab as a candidate of PML-N from Constituency PP-225 (Lodhran-II) in the 2018 Pakistani general election.
