= Nawabzada Haider Mehdi =

Pakistani politician

Member of the Provincial Assembly of the Punjab
- In office 29 May 2013 – 31 May 2018

Personal details
- Born: 24 August 1984 (age 42) Gujrat
- Party: [[Pakistan Muslim League (Nawaz)]]

Nawabzada Haider Mehdi is a Pakistani politician who was a Member of the Provincial Assembly of the Punjab, from May 2013 to May 2018.

== Early life and education ==
He was born on 24 August 1984 in Gujrat.

He has the degree of Bachelor of Arts. He graduated from Brunel University London in 2006. He received Diploma in Business Studies and ABE (I) from City of London College and a Diploma in Business Administration from Holborn College.

== Political career ==
He was elected to the Provincial Assembly of the Punjab as a candidate of Pakistan Muslim League (Nawaz) from Constituency PP-108 (Gujrat-I) in the 2013 Pakistani general election.

In December 2013, he was appointed as Parliamentary Secretary for management & professional development.
