= Chaudhry Faqeer Hussain Dogar =

Pakistani politician

Chaudhry Faqir Hussain Dogar

Member of the Provincial Assembly of the Punjab
- In office 15 August 2018 – 14 January 2023
- Constituency: PP-116 Faisalabad-XX
- In office 29 May 2013 – 31 May 2018
- Constituency: PP-67 Faisalabad-XX

Personal details
- Born: 1 March 1952 (age 74) Faisalabad, Punjab, Pakistan
- Party: PMLN (2013-present)

Chaudhry Faqir Hussain Dogar is a Pakistani politician who was a member of the Provincial Assembly of the Punjab, from May 2013 to May 2018 and from August 2018 till January 2023.

== Early life and education ==
He was born on 1 March 1952 in Faisalabad.

He graduated in 1982 from Government Islamia College, Faisalabad and has a degree of Bachelor of Arts.

== Political career ==
He was elected to the Provincial Assembly of the Punjab as a candidate of Pakistan Muslim League (Nawaz) (PML-N) from Constituency PP-67 (Faisalabad-XVII) in the 2013 Pakistani general election.

He was re-elected to Provincial Assembly of the Punjab as a candidate of PML-N from Constituency PP-116 (Faisalabad-XX) in the 2018 Pakistani general election.
