= Muneeb-ul-Haq =

Pakistani politician

Muneeb ul Haq

Member of the Provincial Assembly of the Punjab
- In office 15 August 2018 – 14 January 2023
- Constituency: PP-189 Okara-VII

Personal details
- Party: PMLN

Muneeb-ul-Haq is a Pakistani politician who had been a member of the Provincial Assembly of the Punjab from August 2018 till January 2023. He is an alumnus of the, National Defense University, American Council of Young Political Leaders, Maritime Security Workshop-4, and International Academy for Leadership (FNF) Gummersbach.

He is the youngest son of politician and businessman Ch Ikram ul Haq who was elected Member of Provincial Assembly from Okara Punjab in 1985.

== Political career ==
He was elected to the Provincial Assembly of the Punjab as a candidate of Pakistan Muslim League (N) from Constituency PP-189 (Okara-VII) in the 2018 Pakistani general election.
