= Zainab Umair =

Pakistani politician

Member of the Provincial Assembly of the Punjab
- In office 15 August 2018 – 14 January 2023
- Constituency: Reserved seat for women

Personal details
- Party: PTI (2018-present)

Zainab Umair is a Pakistani politician who has been a member of the Provincial Assembly of the Punjab since August 2018.

== Political career ==
She was elected to the Provincial Assembly of the Punjab as a candidate of Pakistan Tehreek-e-Insaf (PTI) on a reserved seat for women in the 2018 Pakistani general election.
