= Shahida Ahmed =

Pakistani politician

Member of the Provincial Assembly of the Punjab
- In office 15 August 2018 – 14 January 2023
- Constituency: Reserved seat for women

Personal details
- Party: PTI (2018-present)

Shahida Ahmed is a Pakistani politician who had been a member of the Provincial Assembly of the Punjab from August 2018 till January 2023.

== Early life and education ==
She was born on 6 February 1961 in Rawalpindi, Pakistan.

She has received a degree of Bachelor of Science.

== Political career ==
She was elected to the Provincial Assembly of the Punjab as a candidate of Pakistan Tehreek-e-Insaf (PTI) on a reserved seat for women in the 2018 Pakistani general election.
