= Chaudhry Masood Ahmad =

Pakistani politician

Member of the Provincial Assembly of the Punjab
- In office 15 August 2018 – 14 January 2023
- Constituency: PP-257 Rahim Yar Khan-III

Personal details
- Party: Pakistan Tehreek-e-Insaf (until 2023)

Chaudhry Masood Ahmad is a Pakistani politician who had been a member of the Provincial Assembly of the Punjab from August 2018 till January 2023.

== Political career ==
He was elected to the Provincial Assembly of the Punjab as a candidate of Pakistan Tehreek-e-Insaf from Constituency PP-257 (Rahim Yar Khan-III) in the 2018 Pakistani general election.
