= Tariq Masih Gill =

Pakistani politician

Member of the Provincial Assembly of the Punjab
- In office 29 May 2013 – 31 May 2018
- Constituency: Reserved seat for minorities

Personal details
- Born: 10 November 1962 (age 64)
- Party: PMLN

Tariq Masih Gill is a Pakistani politician who was a Member of the Provincial Assembly of the Punjab, from May 2013 to May 2018.

== Early life ==
He was born on 10 November 1962.

== Political career ==
He was elected to the Provincial Assembly of the Punjab as a candidate of Pakistan Muslim League (N) on reserved seat for minorities in the 2013 Pakistani general election.

In December 2013, he was appointed Parliamentary Secretary for human rights & minorities.

On 13 May 2024, the Election Commission of Pakistan (ECP) suspended his membership as a member of the Provincial Assembly of the Punjab. This action followed a Supreme Court of Pakistan decision to suspend the verdict of the Peshawar High Court, which had denied the allocation of a reserved seat to the PTI-Sunni Ittehad Council bloc.
