= Rana Muhammad Tariq =

Pakistani politician

Member of the Provincial Assembly of the Punjab
- In office 15 August 2018 – 14 January 2023
- Constituency: PP-171 Lahore-XXVIII

Personal details
- Born: 10 September 1960 (age 66)
- Party: PMLN

Rana Muhammad Tariq (Urdu/Punjabi: رانا محمد طارق; born 10 September 1960) is a Pakistani politician who had been a member of the Provincial Assembly of the Punjab from August 2018 till January 2023. He is affiliated with the Pakistan Muslim League (N) (PML-N) and represents Constituency PP-171 (Lahore-XXVIII).

== Early life ==
Rana Muhammad Tariq was born on 10 September 1960 to Rana Shabbir Ahmad. He is a resident of Gulberg, Lahore. A retired army colonel, Tariq was previously a member of the Pakistan Peoples Party before joining the PML-N in 2013.

== Political career ==
He was elected to the Provincial Assembly of the Punjab as a candidate of Pakistan Muslim League (N) from Constituency PP-171 (Lahore-XXVIII) in the 2018 Pakistani general election.
