= Irfan Bashir =

Pakistani politician

Member of the Provincial Assembly of the Punjab
- In office 15 August 2018 – 14 January 2023
- Constituency: PP-64 Gujranwala-XIV
- Incumbent
- Assumed office 24 February 2024

Personal details
- Party: PMLN (2018-present)

Irfan Bashir is a Pakistani politician who had been a Member of the Provincial Assembly of the Punjab from August 2018 till January 2023.

== Political career ==
He was elected to the Provincial Assembly of the Punjab as a candidate of Pakistan Muslim League (N) from Constituency PP-64 (Gujranwala-XIV) in the 2018 Pakistani general election.
