= Raja Muhammad Aslam Khan =

Pakistani politician

Member of the Provincial Assembly of Punjab
- Incumbent
- Assumed office 24 February 2024

Personal details
- Party: PML(Q) (2024-present)

Raja Muhammad Aslam Khan is a Pakistani politician who has been a Member of the Provincial Assembly of the Punjab since 2024.

== Political career ==
He was elected to the Provincial Assembly of the Punjab as a candidate of the Pakistan Muslim League (Q) (PML-Q) from constituency PP-27 Gujrat-I in the 2024 Pakistani general election.
