= Sardar Ghaznafar Ali Khan =

Pakistani politician

Member of the Provincial Assembly of the Punjab
- In office 15 August 2018 – 14 January 2023
- Constituency: PP-255 Rahim Yar Khan-I

Personal details
- Party: PPP (2018-present)

Sardar Ghaznafar Ali Khan is a Pakistani politician who had been a member of the Provincial Assembly of the Punjab from August 2018 till January 2023.

== Political career ==
He was elected to the Provincial Assembly of the Punjab as a candidate of Pakistan Peoples Party from Constituency PP-255 (Rahim Yar Khan-I) in the 2018 Pakistani general election.
