= Sajida Yousaf =

Pakistani politician

Member of the Provincial Assembly of the Punjab
- In office 15 August 2018 – 21 May 2022
- Constituency: Reserved seat for women

Personal details
- Party: IPP (2025-present)
- Other political affiliations: PTI (2018-2022)

Sajida Yousaf is a Pakistani politician who had been a member of the Provincial Assembly of the Punjab from August 2018 till May 2022.

== Political career ==
She was elected to the Provincial Assembly of the Punjab as a candidate of Pakistan Tehreek-e-Insaf (PTI) on a reserved seat for women in the 2018 Pakistani general election. She was de-seated due to a vote against the party policy for the Chief Minister of Punjab election on 16 April 2022.
