= Chaudhry Shahbaz Ahmad =

Pakistani politician

Chaudhry Shahbaz Ahmad چوہدری شہباز احمد
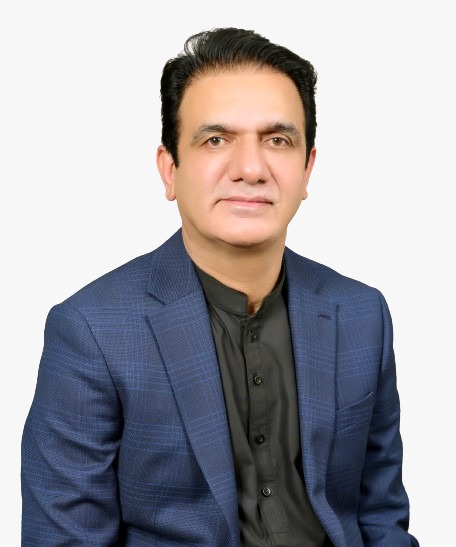

Member of the Provincial Assembly of the Punjab
- In office 15 August 2018 – 14 January 2023
- Constituency: PP-148 Lahore-V
- In office 2008 – 31 May 2018

Personal details
- Born: 14 December 1973 (age 52) Lahore, Punjab, Pakistan
- Party: PMLN (1999-Present)

Chaudhry Shahbaz Ahmad is a Pakistani politician who was a Member of the Provincial Assembly of the Punjab, from 2008 to May 2018 and from August 2018 till January 2023.

== Early life and education ==
He studied at Dayal Singh College during the same era when Khawaja Saad Rafique, Khawaja Salman Rafique, and several other notable political figures were also students there.

He was born on 14 December 1973 in Lahore.

He graduated from University of the Punjab and has a degree of Bachelor of Arts.

He began his political journey as the President of the MSF at Dayal Singh College, where his opponents were left defeated, and under his leadership, the Muslim League became the dominant force on campus. After his successful tenure at the college, he was appointed President MSF Lahore, and later, he earned the position of General Secretary MSF Punjab.

Development Projects in Area

Chaudhry Shehbaz Ahmad has been elected as a Member of the Provincial Assembly three times. Known as a people-friendly leader, he has completed numerous public welfare projects, including:

- Shadbagh Underpass
- Karol Underpass
- Boys College, China Scheme
- TEVTA College
- Special Child School, China Scheme
- Karol Cricket Stadium
- Traditional Wrestling Arena (Akhara)
- Model Bazaar, China Scheme
- Dialysis Centre and Emergency Centre at Kot Khawaja Saeed Hospital
- Ladies Park and Ladies Gym
- Upgradation of several schools
- Installation of tube wells and expansion of water supply networks in the constituency

== Political career ==
After student politics, he stepped into practical politics and was elected as a Councilor in the Corporation in 1998. In 2001, he became the Naib Nazim of Union Council 22 in Lahore, and in 2005 he was elected Nazim of the same union council.

In the 2008 general elections, Chaudhry Shehbaz Ahmad was elected Member of the Provincial Assembly (MPA) on the PML-N ticket with 32,440 votes. His main opponent, Mian Bilal Asghar of the PPP, received 7,673 votes, while PML-Q’s Malik Muhammad Asghar Khan secured 3,075 votes.

In the 2013 elections from Constituency PP-143, he again contested on a PML-N ticket and won with 57,919 votes. His opponent, Arshad Khan of PTI, received 16,424 votes.

From 2014 to 2018, MPA Chaudhry Shehbaz Ahmad was additionally entrusted with the role of Vice Chairman WASA Lahore, a responsibility he fulfilled with excellence.

In the 2018 general elections from Constituency PP-148, Chaudhry Shehbaz Ahmad once again won on a PML-N ticket with 60,608 votes. PTI’s Muhammad Ajsam Sharif secured 43,220 votes, while TLP’s Muhammad Bilal Ahmad received 14,031 votes.

In 2024, he was reappointed as the Vice Chairman of WASA Lahore, a position he continues to hold to this day.

He was elected to the Provincial Assembly of the Punjab as a candidate of the Pakistan Muslim League (Nawaz) (PML-N) from Constituency PP-143 (Lahore-VII) in the 2008 Pakistani general election. He received 32,440 votes and defeated Mian Mohammad Bilal Asghar, a candidate of Pakistan Peoples Party (PPP).

He was re-elected to the Provincial Assembly of the Punjab as a candidate of PML-N from Constituency PP-143 (Lahore-VII) in the 2013 Pakistani general election. He received 57,919 votes and defeated Mohammad Arshad Khan, a candidate of Pakistan Tehreek-e-Insaf (PTI).

He was re-elected to the Provincial Assembly of the Punjab as a candidate of PML-N from Constituency PP-148 (Lahore-V) in the 2018 Pakistani general election.
