= Aneeza Fatima =

Pakistani politician

Member of the Provincial Assembly of the Punjab
- In office 15 August 2018 – 14 January 2023
- Constituency: Reserved seat for women

Personal details
- Party: AP (2025-present)
- Other political affiliations: PMLN (2018-2025)
- Spouse: Muhammad Idrees Rafique Bhatti

Aneeza Fatima (born 17 January 1984) is a Pakistani politician who had been a member of the Provincial Assembly of the Punjab from August 2018 till January 2023.

== Early life and education ==
Fatima was born and brought up in Lahore. Her father Ch. Muhammad Masaud Akhtar Khan was a District and Sessions Judge during 1970 to 2001. Fatima graduated from the University of the Punjab with a Masters in Science and Education from Kinnaird College.

== Career ==
Fatima volunteered as coordinator for the Youth Programme at the prime minister's House. Following in her grandfather's footsteps in politics, Ch. Allah Dad Khan, who was a member of the Punjab Legislative Council during 1930-36, she became a candidate of the Pakistan Muslim League (N) (PML-N) for the 2018 elections. She was elected to the Provincial Assembly of the Punjab on a reserved seat for women in the 2018 Pakistani general election.
