= Haji Atta Ur Rehman =

Pakistani politician

Member of the Provincial Assembly of the Punjab
- In office 15 August 2018 – 14 January 2023
- Constituency: PP-210 Khanewal-VIII

Personal details
- Party: PMLN

Haji Atta Ur Rehman is a Pakistani politician who had been a member of the Provincial Assembly of the Punjab from August 2018 till January 2023.

== Political career ==
He was elected to the Provincial Assembly of the Punjab as a candidate of Pakistan Muslim League (N) from Constituency PP-210 (Khanewal-VIII) in the 2018 Pakistani general election.

== Khadim-e-Jahanian ==
Haji Atta ur Rehman is social worker and known as Khadim-e-Jahanian in his constituency. He started his political career as City Nazim of Jahanian. During his tenure, he maintained the Electrification System, Drainage System and completed development projects in Jahanian. He provided the constituency with Electricity, Gas, Passport Office, Filtration Plants, Roads, Schools, Upgradation of Hospital, BZU Bus Shuttle Service and many more.
