= Shafiq Ahmad Gujjar =

Pakistani politician

Chaudhry Shafiq Ahmad Gujjar

Member of the Provincial Assembly of the Punjab
- In office 15 August 2018 – 14 January 2023
- Constituency: PP-107 Faisalabad-XI

Personal details
- Party: PMLN

Chaudhry Shafiq Ahmad Gujjar is a Pakistani politician who had been a member of the Provincial Assembly of the Punjab from August 2018 till January 2023.

== Political career ==
He started his political career from local bodies politics and was elected to Nazim Union Council. He was elected to Provincial Assembly of the Punjab as candidate of PML(N) from PP-68 Faisalabad in 2008 Pakistani general election. He was re-elected to the Provincial Assembly of the Punjab as a candidate of Pakistan Muslim League (N) from Constituency PP-107 (Faisalabad-XI) in the 2018 Pakistani general election for second term.
