= Rana Ali Abbas Khan =

Politician in Pakistan

Member of the Provincial Assembly of the Punjab
- In office 15 August 2018 – 14 January 2023
- Constituency: PP-115 Faisalabad-XIX

Personal details
- Born: 1 January 1970 (age 56) Faisalabad, Punjab, Pakistan
- Party: TLP (2025-present)
- Other political affiliations: PMLN (2018-2025)

Rana Ali Abbas Khan (born 1 January 1970) is a Pakistani politician who had been a member of the Provincial Assembly of the Punjab from August 2018 till January 2023.

== Political career ==
He was elected to the Provincial Assembly of the Punjab as a candidate of Pakistan Muslim League (N) from Constituency PP-115 (Faisalabad-XIX) in the 2018 Pakistani general election.

He again contested the Provincial Assembly of the Punjab as a candidate of Pakistan Muslim League (N) from Constituency PP-113 Faisalabad-XVI in the 2024 Pakistani general election. He lost the election by obtaining 25,311 votes. He was defeated by Nadeem Sadiq Dogar of Pakistan Tehreek-e-Insaf by a heavy margin of 35,309 votes.
