= Mahmood ul Haq =

Pakistani politician

Member of the Provincial Assembly of the Punjab
- In office 15 August 2018 – 14 January 2023
- Constituency: PP-141 Sheikhupura-VII

Personal details
- Party: AP (2025-present)
- Other political affiliations: PMLN (2018-2025)

Chaudary Mahmood ul Haq son of Chaudary Fazal Qadir Khan is a Pakistani politician who belongs to the Bhatti clan of Rajputs in Sheikhupura and had been a member of the Provincial Assembly of the Punjab from August 2018 till January 2023. He also remained Tehsil Nazim Sheikhupura during 2001-2005. He also remained Councillor Town Committee Mananwala 1998-1999 and his brother also remained Nazim Mananwala during 2001-2005.

== Political career ==
He was elected to the Provincial Assembly of the Punjab as a candidate of Pakistan Muslim League (N) from Constituency PP-141 (Sheikhupura-VII) in the 2018 Pakistani general election.
