= Asia Amjad =

Pakistani politician

- آسیہ امجد

Member of the Provincial Assembly of the Punjab
- In office 15 August 2018 – 14 January 2023
- Constituency: Reserved seat for women

Personal details
- Party: PTI (2018-present)

Asia Amjad was a Pakistani politician who was a member of the Provincial Assembly of the Punjab from August 2018 until January 2023.

== Political career ==
She was elected to the Provincial Assembly of the Punjab as a candidate of Pakistan Tehreek-e-Insaf (PTI) on a reserved seat for women in the 2018 Pakistani general election.
