= List of members of the 17th Provincial Assembly of the Punjab =

The 17th Provincial Assembly of Punjab was the legislature of Punjab, Pakistan following the 2018 provincial election to the Provincial Assembly of the Punjab.

On 23 May 2022, the Election Commission of Pakistan officially de-notified 25 dissident Pakistan Tehreek-e-Insaf MPAs who voted for the Pakistan Muslim League (N)'s Hamza Shahbaz in the Punjab chief minister election.

On 12 January 2023, Chaudhry Pervaiz Elahi sent a summary to dissolve the Assembly to the Governor of Punjab. The Assembly was dissolved after 48 hours at 10:10 PM (PST) on 14 January 2023.

== Members ==
No.	Constituency name	District	Party	Member	Assumed office
1	Attock-I	Attock	Pakistan Tehreek-e-Insaf	Syed Yawer Abbas Bukhari	15 August 2018
2	Attock-II	Attock	Pakistan Muslim League (N)	Jahangir Khanzada	15 August 2018
3	Attock-III	Attock	Pakistan Muslim League (N)	Sardar Iftikhar Ahmed Khan	24 October 2018
4	Attock-IV	Attock	Pakistan Tehreek-e-Insaf	Malik Muhammad Anwar	15 August 2018
5	Attock-V	Attock	Pakistan Tehreek-e-Insaf	Malik Jamshed Altaf	15 August 2018
6	Rawalpindi-I	Rawalpindi	Pakistan Tehreek-e-Insaf	Muhammad Latasab Satti	15 August 2018
7	Rawalpindi-II	Rawalpindi	Pakistan Muslim League (N)	Raja Sagheer Ahmed	22 August 2022
8	Rawalpindi-III	Rawalpindi	Pakistan Tehreek-e-Insaf	Javed Kausar	15 August 2018
9	Rawalpindi-IV	Rawalpindi	Pakistan Tehreek-e-Insaf	Chaudhary Sajid Mehmood	15 August 2018
10	Rawalpindi-V	Rawalpindi	Independent	Nisar Ali Khan	26 May 2021
11	Rawalpindi-VI	Rawalpindi	Pakistan Tehreek-e-Insaf	Chaudhry Muhammad Adnan	15 August 2018
12	Rawalpindi-VII	Rawalpindi	Pakistan Tehreek-e-Insaf	Wasiq Qayyum Abbasi	15 August 2018
13	Rawalpindi-VIII	Rawalpindi	Pakistan Tehreek-e-Insaf	Amjad Mehmood Chaudhry	15 August 2018
14	Rawalpindi-IX	Rawalpindi	Pakistan Tehreek-e-Insaf	Raja Muhammad Basharat	15 August 2018
15	Rawalpindi-X	Rawalpindi	Pakistan Tehreek-e-Insaf	Umer Tanveer	15 August 2018
16	Rawalpindi-XI	Rawalpindi	Pakistan Tehreek-e-Insaf	Raja Rashid Hafeez	15 August 2018
17	Rawalpindi-XII	Rawalpindi	Pakistan Tehreek-e-Insaf	Fayyaz Ul Hassan Chohan	15 August 2018
18	Rawalpindi-XIII	Rawalpindi	Pakistan Tehreek-e-Insaf	Ejaz Khan	15 August 2018
19	Rawalpindi-XIV	Rawalpindi	Pakistan Tehreek-e-Insaf	Ammar Siddique Khan	15 August 2018
20	Rawalpindi-XV	Rawalpindi	Pakistan Tehreek-e-Insaf	Malik Taimoor Masood	15 August 2018
21	Chakwal-I	Chakwal	Pakistan Tehreek-e-Insaf	Raja Yasir Humayun Sarfraz	15 August 2018
22	Chakwal-II	Chakwal	Pakistan Muslim League (N)	Tanveer Aslam Malik	15 August 2018
23	Chakwal-III	Chakwal	Pakistan Tehreek-e-Insaf	Sardar Aftab Akbar Khan	15 August 2018
24	Chakwal-IV	Chakwal	Pakistan Muslim League (Q)	Ammar Yasir	15 August 2018
25	Jhelum-I	Jhelum	Pakistan Tehreek-e-Insaf	Raja Yawar Kamal Khan	15 August 2018
26	Jhelum-II	Jhelum	Pakistan Tehreek-e-Insaf	Chaudhry Zafar Iqbal	15 August 2018
27	Jhelum-III	Jhelum	Pakistan Muslim League (N)	Nasir Mehmood	24 October 2018
28	Gujrat-I	Gujrat	Pakistan Muslim League (Q)	Shujaat Nawaz	15 August 2018
29	Gujrat-II	Gujrat	Pakistan Muslim League (Q)	Muhammad Abdullah Warraich	15 August 2018
30	Gujrat-III	Gujrat	Pakistan Muslim League (Q)	Chaudhry Pervaiz Elahi	15 August 2018
31	Gujrat-IV	Gujrat	Pakistan Tehreek-e-Insaf	Saleem Sarwar Jaura	15 August 2018
32	Gujrat-V	Gujrat	Pakistan Tehreek-e-Insaf	Mian Muhammad Akhtar Hayat	15 August 2018
33	Gujrat-VI	Gujrat	Pakistan Tehreek-e-Insaf	Chaudhry Liaqat Ali	15 August 2018
34	Gujrat-VII	Gujrat	Pakistan Tehreek-e-Insaf	Muhammad Arshad Chaudhry	15 August 2018
35	Sialkot-I	Sialkot	Pakistan Muslim League (N)	Rana Arif Iqbal	15 August 2018
36	Sialkot-II	Sialkot	Pakistan Tehreek-e-Insaf	Chaudhry Muhammad Akhlaq	15 August 2018
37	Sialkot-III	Sialkot	Pakistan Muslim League (N)	Muhammad Mansha Ullah Butt	15 August 2018
38	Sialkot-IV	Sialkot	Pakistan Tehreek-e-Insaf	Ahsan Saleem	9 August 2021
39	Sialkot-V	Sialkot	Pakistan Muslim League (N)	Rana Liaqat Ali	15 August 2018
40	Sialkot-VI	Sialkot	Pakistan Muslim League (N)	Rana Muhammad Afzal	15 August 2018
41	Sialkot-VII	Sialkot	Pakistan Muslim League (Q)	Bao Muhammad Rizwan	15 August 2018
42	Sialkot-VIII	Sialkot	Pakistan Muslim League (N)	Zeeshan Rafiq	15 August 2018
43	Sialkot-IX	Sialkot	Pakistan Muslim League (N)	Chaudhry Naveed Ashraf	15 August 2018
44	Sialkot-X	Sialkot	Pakistan Muslim League (N)	Chaudhry Arshad Javaid Warraich	15 August 2018
45	Sialkot-XI	Sialkot	Pakistan Muslim League (N)	Rana Abdul Sattar	15 August 2018
46	Narowal-I	Narowal	Pakistan Tehreek-e-Insaf	Syed Saeed ul Hassan	15 August 2018
47	Narowal-II	Narowal	Pakistan Muslim League (N)	Abu Hafs Muhammad Ghiyas-ud-Din	15 August 2018
48	Narowal-III	Narowal	Pakistan Muslim League (N)	Rana Mannan Khan	15 August 2018
49	Narowal-IV	Narowal	Pakistan Muslim League (N)	Bilal Akbar Khan	15 August 2018
50	Narowal-V	Narowal	Pakistan Muslim League (N)	Khawaja Muhammad Waseem	15 August 2018
51	Gujranwala-I	Gujranwala	Pakistan Muslim League (N)	Tallat Mehmood	8 March 2021
52	Gujranwala-II	Gujranwala	Pakistan Muslim League (N)	Chaudhary Aadil Bakhsh Chattha	15 August 2018
53	Gujranwala-III	Gujranwala	Pakistan Muslim League (N)	Bilal Farooq Tarar	15 August 2018
54	Gujranwala-IV	Gujranwala	Pakistan Muslim League (N)	Imran Khalid Butt	15 August 2018
55	Gujranwala-V	Gujranwala	Pakistan Muslim League (N)	Muhammad Nawaz Chohan	15 August 2018
56	Gujranwala-VI	Gujranwala	Pakistan Muslim League (N)	Muhammad Taufeeq Butt	15 August 2018
57	Gujranwala-VII	Gujranwala	Pakistan Muslim League (N)	Chaudhry Ashraf Ali Ansari	15 August 2018
58	Gujranwala-VIII	Gujranwala	Pakistan Muslim League (N)	Abdul Rauf Mughal	15 August 2018
59	Gujranwala-IX	Gujranwala	Pakistan Muslim League (N)	Chaudhry Waqar Ahmad Cheema	15 August 2018
60	Gujranwala-X	Gujranwala	Pakistan Muslim League (N)	Qaiser Iqbal Sindhu	15 August 2018
61	Gujranwala-XI	Gujranwala	Pakistan Muslim League (N)	Chaudhry Akhtar Ali Khan	15 August 2018
62	Gujranwala-XII	Gujranwala	Pakistan Muslim League (N)	Aman Ullah Warraich	15 August 2018
63	Gujranwala-XIII	Gujranwala	Pakistan Muslim League (N)	Muhammad Iqbal Gujjar	15 August 2018
64	Gujranwala-XIV	Gujranwala	Pakistan Muslim League (N)	Irfan Bashir	15 August 2018
65	Mandi Bahauddin-I	Mandi Bahauddin	Pakistan Muslim League (N)	Hameeda Waheeduddin	15 August 2018
66	Mandi Bahauddin-II	Mandi Bahauddin	Pakistan Tehreek-e-Insaf	Muhammad Tariq Tarar	15 August 2018
67	Mandi Bahauddin-III	Mandi Bahauddin	Pakistan Muslim League (Q)	Sajid Ahmad Khan	15 August 2018
68	Mandi Bahauddin-IV	Mandi Bahauddin	Pakistan Tehreek-e-Insaf	Gulraiz Afzal Gondal	15 August 2018
69	Hafizabad-I	Hafizabad	Pakistan Tehreek-e-Insaf	Mamoon Jaffar Tarar	15 August 2018
70	Hafizabad-II	Hafizabad	Pakistan Muslim League (N)	Muzaffar Ali Sheikh	15 August 2018
71	Hafizabad-III	Hafizabad	Pakistan Tehreek-e-Insaf	Muhammad Ahsan Jahangir	15 August 2018
72	Sargodha-I	Sargodha	Pakistan Muslim League (N)	Shoaib Ahmad Malik	15 August 2018
73	Sargodha-II	Sargodha	Pakistan Muslim League (N)	Yasir Zafar Sindhu	15 August 2018
74	Sargodha-III	Sargodha	Pakistan Muslim League (N)	Mian Manazir Hussain Ranjha	15 August 2018
75	Sargodha-IV	Sargodha	Pakistan Tehreek-e-Insaf	Muhammad Muneeb Sultan Cheema	15 August 2018
76	Sargodha-V	Sargodha	Pakistan Tehreek-e-Insaf	Chaudhry Faisal Farooq Cheema	15 August 2018
77	Sargodha-VI	Sargodha	Pakistan Muslim League (N)	Liaquat Ali Khan	15 August 2018
78	Sargodha-VII	Sargodha	Pakistan Tehreek-e-Insaf	Ansar Majeed Khan Niazi	15 August 2018
79	Sargodha-VIII	Sargodha	Pakistan Muslim League (N)	Rana Munawar Hussain	15 August 2018
80	Sargodha-IX	Sargodha	Pakistan Tehreek-e-Insaf	Ghulam Ali Asghar Khan Lahry	15 August 2018
81	Sargodha-X	Sargodha	Pakistan Tehreek-e-Insaf	Chaudhry Iftikhar Hussain	15 August 2018
82	Khushab-I	Khushab	Pakistan Tehreek-e-Insaf	Fateh Khaliq	15 August 2018
83	Khushab-II	Khushab	Pakistan Tehreek-e-Insaf	Hassan Aslam Awan	21 July 2022
84	Khushab-III	Khushab	Pakistan Muslim League (N)	Muhammad Moazzam Sher	18 May 2021
85	Mianwali-I	Mianwali	Pakistan Tehreek-e-Insaf	Abdul Rehman Khan	15 August 2018
86	Mianwali-II	Mianwali	Pakistan Tehreek-e-Insaf	Amin Ullah Khan	15 August 2018
87	Mianwali-III	Mianwali	Pakistan Tehreek-e-Insaf	Malik Ahmad Khan Bhachar	16 October 2018
88	Mianwali-IV	Mianwali	Pakistan Tehreek-e-Insaf	Muhammad Sibtain Khan	15 August 2018
89	Bhakkar-I	Bhakkar	Pakistan Tehreek-e-Insaf	Ameer Muhammad Khan	15 August 2018
90	Bhakkar-II	Bhakkar	Pakistan Tehreek-e-Insaf	Irfan Ullah Khan Niazi	21 July 2022
91	Bhakkar-III	Bhakkar	Pakistan Tehreek-e-Insaf	Ghazanfar Abbas Cheena	15 August 2018
92	Bhakkar-IV	Bhakkar	Pakistan Tehreek-e-Insaf	Amir Inayat Khan Shahani	15 August 2018
93	Chiniot-I	Chiniot	Pakistan Tehreek-e-Insaf	Taimoor Ali Lali	15 August 2018
94	Chiniot-II	Chiniot	Pakistan Muslim League (N)	Ilyas Chinioti	15 August 2018
95	Chiniot-III	Chiniot	Pakistan Peoples Party	Syed Hassan Murtaza	15 August 2018
96	Chiniot-IV	Chiniot	Pakistan Tehreek-e-Insaf	Saleem Bibi Bharwana	15 August 2018
97	Faisalabad-I	Faisalabad	Pakistan Tehreek-e-Insaf	Ali Afzal Sahi	21 July 2022
98	Faisalabad-II	Faisalabad	Pakistan Muslim League (N)	Rana Shoaib Adrees Khan	15 August 2018
99	Faisalabad-III	Faisalabad	Pakistan Tehreek-e-Insaf	Chaudhry Ali Akhter Khan	15 August 2018
100	Faisalabad-IV	Faisalabad	Pakistan Tehreek-e-Insaf	Chaudhry Zaheer Ud Din	15 August 2018
101	Faisalabad-V	Faisalabad	Pakistan Muslim League (N)	Rai Haider Ali Khan	15 August 2018
102	Faisalabad-VI	Faisalabad	Pakistan Tehreek-e-Insaf	Adil Pervaiz Gujjar	15 August 2018
103	Faisalabad-VII	Faisalabad	Pakistan Muslim League (N)	Jafar Ali Hocha	24 October 2018
104	Faisalabad-VIII	Faisalabad	Pakistan Muslim League (N)	Muhammad Safdar Shakir	15 August 2018
105	Faisalabad-IX	Faisalabad	Pakistan Tehreek-e-Insaf	Hafiz Mumtaz Ahmed	15 August 2018
106	Faisalabad-X	Faisalabad	Pakistan Tehreek-e-Insaf	Malik Umer Farooq	15 August 2018
107	Faisalabad-XI	Faisalabad	Pakistan Muslim League (N)	Shafiq Ahmad Gujjar	15 August 2018
108	Faisalabad-XII	Faisalabad	Pakistan Muslim League (N)	Muhammad Ajmal Asif	15 August 2018
109	Faisalabad-XIII	Faisalabad	Pakistan Muslim League (N)	Chaudhry Zafar Iqbal Nagra	15 August 2018
110	Faisalabad-XIV	Faisalabad	Pakistan Tehreek-e-Insaf	Khayal Ahmad Kastro	15 August 2018
111	Faisalabad-XV	Faisalabad	Pakistan Tehreek-e-Insaf	Shakeel Shahid	15 August 2018
112	Faisalabad-XVI	Faisalabad	Pakistan Muslim League (N)	Muhammad Tahir Pervaiz	15 August 2018
113	Faisalabad-XVII	Faisalabad	Pakistan Tehreek-e-Insaf	Muhammad Waris Aziz	15 August 2018
114	Faisalabad-XVIII	Faisalabad	Pakistan Tehreek-e-Insaf	Chaudhry Latif Nazar Gujjar	15 August 2018
115	Faisalabad-XIX	Faisalabad	Pakistan Muslim League (N)	Rana Ali Abbas Khan	15 August 2018
116	Faisalabad-XX	Faisalabad	Pakistan Muslim League (N)	Chaudhry Faqeer Hussain Dogar	15 August 2018
117	Faisalabad-XXI	Faisalabad	Pakistan Muslim League (N)	Mehar Hamid Rashid	15 August 2018
118	Toba Tek Singh-I	Toba Tek Singh	Independent	Bilal Asghar Warraich	24 October 2018
119	Toba Tek Singh-II	Toba Tek Singh	Pakistan Muslim League (N)	Abdul Qadeer Alvi	15 August 2018
120	Toba Tek Singh-III	Toba Tek Singh	Pakistan Muslim League (N)	Sardar Mohammad Ayub Khan	15 August 2018
121	Toba Tek Singh-IV	Toba Tek Singh	Pakistan Tehreek-e-Insaf	Saeed Ahmad Saeedi	15 August 2018
122	Toba Tek Singh-V	Toba Tek Singh	Pakistan Tehreek-e-Insaf	Ashifa Riaz Fatyana	15 August 2018
123	Toba Tek Singh-VI	Toba Tek Singh	Pakistan Tehreek-e-Insaf	Syeda Sonia Ali Raza Shah	20 February 2019
124	Jhang-I	Jhang	Pakistan Tehreek-e-Insaf	Rai Taimoor Khan	15 August 2018
125	Jhang-II	Jhang	Pakistan Tehreek-e-Insaf	Mian Muhammad Azam Cheela	21 July 2022
126	Jhang-III	Jhang	Pakistan Rah-e-Haq Party	Moavia Azam Tariq	15 August 2018
127	Jhang-IV	Jhang	Pakistan Tehreek-e-Insaf	Muhammad Nawaz Bharwana	21 July 2022
128	Jhang-V	Jhang	Pakistan Tehreek-e-Insaf	Ghazanfar Abbas Shah	15 August 2018
129	Jhang-VI	Jhang	Pakistan Tehreek-e-Insaf	Mian Muhammad Asif Kathia	15 August 2018
130	Jhang-VII	Jhang	Pakistan Tehreek-e-Insaf	Rana Shahbaz Ahmad	15 August 2018
131	Nankana Sahib-I	Nankana Sahib	Pakistan Muslim League (N)	Mian Ijaz Hussain Bhatti	15 August 2018
132	Nankana Sahib-II	Nankana Sahib	Pakistan Tehreek-e-Insaf	Mian Muhammad Atif	15 August 2018
133	Nankana Sahib-III	Nankana Sahib	Pakistan Muslim League (N)	Mahr Muhammad Kashif	15 August 2018
134	Nankana Sahib-IV	Nankana Sahib	Pakistan Muslim League (N)	Agha Ali Haidar	15 August 2018
135	Sheikhupura-I	Sheikhupura	Pakistan Tehreek-e-Insaf	Umar Aftab Dhillon	15 August 2018
136	Sheikhupura-II	Sheikhupura	Pakistan Tehreek-e-Insaf	Khurram Ijaz Chattah	15 August 2018
137	Sheikhupura-III	Sheikhupura	Pakistan Muslim League (N)	Pir Muhammad Ashraf Rasool	15 August 2018
138	Sheikhupura-IV	Sheikhupura	Pakistan Muslim League (N)	Mian Abdul Rauf	15 August 2018
139	Sheikhupura-V	Sheikhupura	Pakistan Muslim League (N)	Chaudhry Iftikhar Ahmad Bhangoo	27 October 2022
140	Sheikhupura-VI	Sheikhupura	Pakistan Tehreek-e-Insaf	Khurram Virk	21 July 2022
141	Sheikhupura-VII	Sheikhupura	Pakistan Muslim League (N)	Mahmood ul Haq	15 August 2018
142	Sheikhupura-VIII	Sheikhupura	Pakistan Tehreek-e-Insaf	Khan Sher Akbar Khan	15 August 2018
143	Sheikhupura-IX	Sheikhupura	Pakistan Muslim League (N)	Sajjad Haider Nadeem	15 August 2018
144	Lahore-I	Lahore	Pakistan Muslim League (N)	Sami Ullah Khan	15 August 2018
145	Lahore-II	Lahore	Pakistan Muslim League (N)	Ghazali Saleem Butt	15 August 2018
146	Lahore-III	Lahore	Pakistan Muslim League (N)	Hamza Shahbaz Sharif	15 August 2018
147	Lahore-IV	Lahore	Pakistan Muslim League (N)	Mian Mujtaba Shuja-ur-Rehman	15 August 2018
148	Lahore-V	Lahore	Pakistan Muslim League (N)	Chaudhry Shahbaz Ahmad	15 August 2018
149	Lahore-VI	Lahore	Pakistan Muslim League (N)	Mian Marghoob Ahmad	15 August 2018
150	Lahore-VII	Lahore	Pakistan Muslim League (N)	Bilal Yasin	15 August 2018
151	Lahore-VIII	Lahore	Pakistan Tehreek-e-Insaf	Mian Muhammad Aslam Iqbal	15 August 2018
152	Lahore-IX	Lahore	Pakistan Muslim League (N)	Rana Mashhood Ahmad Khan	15 August 2018
153	Lahore-X	Lahore	Pakistan Muslim League (N)	Khawaja Imran Nazeer	15 August 2018
154	Lahore-XI	Lahore	Pakistan Muslim League (N)	Bao Chaudhry Akhtar Ali	15 August 2018
155	Lahore-XII	Lahore	Pakistan Muslim League (N)	Malik Ghulam Habib Awan	15 August 2018
156	Lahore-XIII	Lahore	Pakistan Muslim League (N)	Malik Muhammad Waheed	16 August 2018
157	Lahore-XIV	Lahore	Pakistan Muslim League (N)	Khawaja Salman Rafique	15 August 2018
158	Lahore-XV	Lahore	Pakistan Tehreek-e-Insaf	Mian Akram Usman	21 July 2022
159	Lahore-XVI	Lahore	Pakistan Tehreek-e-Insaf	Murad Raas	15 August 2018
160	Lahore-XVII	Lahore	Pakistan Tehreek-e-Insaf	Mehmood-ur-Rasheed	15 August 2018
161	Lahore-XVIII	Lahore	Pakistan Tehreek-e-Insaf	Malik Nadeem Abbas	15 August 2018
162	Lahore-XIX	Lahore	Pakistan Muslim League (N)	Muhammad Yasin Amir	15 August 2018
163	Lahore-XX	Lahore	Pakistan Muslim League (N)	Mian Naseer Ahmad	15 August 2018
164	Lahore-XXI	Lahore	Pakistan Muslim League (N)	Sohail Shaukat Butt	24 October 2018
165	Lahore-XXII	Lahore	Pakistan Muslim League (N)	Malik Saif ul Malook Khokhar	24 October 2018
166	Lahore-XXIII	Lahore	Pakistan Muslim League (N)	Ramzan Siddique Bhatti	15 August 2018
167	Lahore-XXIV	Lahore	Pakistan Tehreek-e-Insaf	Shabbir Gujjar	21 July 2022
168	Lahore-XXV	Lahore	Pakistan Muslim League (N)	Malik Asad Ali Khokhar	21 July 2022
169	Lahore-XXVI	Lahore	Pakistan Muslim League (N)	Akhtar Hussain Badshah	15 August 2018
170	Lahore-XXVII	Lahore	Pakistan Tehreek-e-Insaf	Zaheer Abbas Khokhar	21 July 2022
171	Lahore-XXVIII	Lahore	Pakistan Muslim League (N)	Rana Muhammad Tariq	15 August 2018
172	Lahore-XXIX	Lahore	Pakistan Muslim League (N)	Muhammad Mirza Javed	15 August 2018
173	Lahore-XXX	Lahore	Pakistan Tehreek-e-Insaf	Sarfraz Hussain	15 August 2018
174	Kasur-I	Kasur	Pakistan Muslim League (N)	Muhammad Naeem Safdar Ansari	15 August 2018
175	Kasur-II	Kasur	Pakistan Muslim League (N)	Malik Ahmad Saeed Khan	15 August 2018
176	Kasur-III	Kasur	Pakistan Muslim League (N)	Malik Muhammad Ahmad Khan	15 August 2018
177	Kasur-IV	Kasur	Pakistan Tehreek-e-Insaf	Muhammad Hashim Dogar	15 August 2018
178	Kasur-V	Kasur	Pakistan Muslim League (N)	Sheikh Allauddin	15 August 2018
179	Kasur-VI	Kasur	Pakistan Tehreek-e-Insaf	Malik Mukhtar Ahmad	15 August 2018
180	Kasur-VII	Kasur	Pakistan Tehreek-e-Insaf	Muhammad Asif Nakai	15 August 2018
181	Kasur-VIII	Kasur	Pakistan Muslim League (N)	Rana Muhammad Iqbal Khan	15 August 2018
182	Kasur-IX	Kasur	Pakistan Muslim League (N)	Muhammad Ilyas Khan	15 August 2018
183	Okara-I	Okara	Pakistan Muslim League (N)	Javaid Alla-ud-Din Sajid	15 August 2018
184	Okara-II	Okara	Independent	Syeda Maimanat Mohsin	15 August 2018
185	Okara-III	Okara	Pakistan Muslim League (N)	Chaudry Iftikhar Hussain Chachar	15 August 2018
186	Okara-IV	Okara	Pakistan Muslim League (N)	Noor Ul Amin Wattoo	15 August 2018
187	Okara-V	Okara	Pakistan Muslim League (N)	Malik Ali Abbas Khokhar	15 August 2018
188	Okara-VI	Okara	Pakistan Muslim League (N)	Mian Yawar Zaman	15 August 2018
189	Okara-VII	Okara	Pakistan Muslim League (N)	Muneeb ul Haq	15 August 2018
190	Okara-VIII	Okara	Pakistan Muslim League (N)	Ghulam Raza	15 August 2018
191	Pakpattan-I	Pakpattan	Pakistan Tehreek-e-Insaf	Muhammad Farrukh Mumtaz Maneka	15 August 2018
192	Pakpattan-II	Pakpattan	Pakistan Muslim League (N)	Mian Naveed Ali	15 August 2018
193	Pakpattan-III	Pakpattan	Pakistan Tehreek-e-Insaf	Ahmad Shah Khagga	15 August 2018
194	Pakpattan-IV	Pakpattan	Pakistan Tehreek-e-Insaf	Chaudhry Muhammad Naeem Ibrahim	15 August 2018
195	Pakpattan-V	Pakpattan	Pakistan Muslim League (N)	Pir Kashif Ali Chishty	15 August 2018
196	Sahiwal-I	Sahiwal	Pakistan Muslim League (N)	Peer Khizer Hayat Shah Khagga	15 August 2018
197	Sahiwal-II	Sahiwal	Pakistan Muslim League (N)	Malik Nadeem Kamran	15 August 2018
198	Sahiwal-III	Sahiwal	Pakistan Muslim League (N)	Muhammad Arshad Malik	15 August 2018
199	Sahiwal-IV	Sahiwal	Pakistan Muslim League (N)	Naveed Aslam Khan Lodhi	15 August 2018
200	Sahiwal-V	Sahiwal	Pakistan Muslim League (N)	Rana Riaz Ahmad	15 August 2018
201	Sahiwal-VI	Sahiwal	Pakistan Tehreek-e-Insaf	Syed Samsam Bukhari	24 October 2018
202	Sahiwal-VII	Sahiwal	Pakistan Tehreek-e-Insaf	Ghulam Sarwar	21 July 2022
203	Khanewal-I	Khanewal	Pakistan Tehreek-e-Insaf	Syed Khawar Ali Shah	15 August 2018
204	Khanewal-II	Khanewal	Pakistan Tehreek-e-Insaf	Syed Hussain Jahania Gardezi	15 August 2018
205	Khanewal-III	Khanewal	Pakistan Tehreek-e-Insaf	Hamid Yar Hiraj	15 August 2018
206	Khanewal-IV	Khanewal	Pakistan Muslim League (N)	Rana Muhammad Saleem	27 December 2021
207	Khanewal-V	Khanewal	Pakistan Tehreek-e-Insaf	Syed Abbas Ali Shah	15 August 2018
208	Khanewal-VI	Khanewal	Pakistan Muslim League (N)	Babar Hussain Abid	15 August 2018
209	Khanewal-VII	Khanewal	Pakistan Tehreek-e-Insaf	Faisal Khan Niazi	27 October 2022
210	Khanewal-VIII	Khanewal	Pakistan Muslim League (N)	Haji Atta Ur Rehman	15 August 2018
211	Multan-I	Multan	Pakistan Peoples Party	Ali Haider Gillani	15 August 2018
212	Multan-II	Multan	Pakistan Tehreek-e-Insaf	Muhammad Saleem Akhtar	15 August 2018
213	Multan-III	Multan	Pakistan Tehreek-e-Insaf	Nawabzada Waseem Khan Badozai	15 August 2018
214	Multan-IV	Multan	Pakistan Tehreek-e-Insaf	Muhammad Zaheer ud Din Khan Alizai	15 August 2018
215	Multan-V	Multan	Pakistan Tehreek-e-Insaf	Javed Akhtar Ansari	15 August 2018
216	Multan-VI	Multan	Pakistan Tehreek-e-Insaf	Muhammad Nadeem Qureshi	15 August 2018
217	Multan-VII	Multan	Pakistan Tehreek-e-Insaf	Zain Qureshi	21 July 2022
218	Multan-VIII	Multan	Pakistan Tehreek-e-Insaf	Malik Wasif Mazhar Raan	11 April 2019
219	Multan-IX	Multan	Pakistan Tehreek-e-Insaf	Muhammad Akhtar Malik	15 August 2018
220	Multan-X	Multan	Pakistan Tehreek-e-Insaf	Mian Tariq Abdullah	15 August 2018
221	Multan-XI	Multan	Pakistan Muslim League (N)	Rana Ijaz Ahmad Noon	15 August 2018
222	Multan-XII	Multan	Independent	Qasim Abbas Khan	24 October 2018
223	Multan-XIII	Multan	Pakistan Muslim League (N)	Naghma Mushtaq	15 August 2018
224	Lodhran-I	Lodhran	Pakistan Tehreek-e-Insaf	Amir Iqbal Shah	21 July 2022
225	Lodhran-II	Lodhran	Pakistan Muslim League (N)	Pirzada Muhammad Jahangir Sultan	15 August 2018
226	Lodhran-III	Lodhran	Pakistan Muslim League (N)	Shah Muhammad Joya	15 August 2018
227	Lodhran-IV	Lodhran	Pakistan Muslim League (N)	Siddique Khan Baloch	15 August 2018
228	Lodhran-V	Lodhran	Independent	Syed Rafi Uddin	21 July 2022
229	Vehari-I	Vehari	Pakistan Muslim League (N)	Chaudhry Muhammad Yousaf Kaselya	15 August 2018
230	Vehari-II	Vehari	Pakistan Muslim League (N)	Khalid Mehmood Dogar	15 August 2018
231	Vehari-III	Vehari	Pakistan Muslim League (N)	Mian Irfan Aqeel Daultana	15 August 2018
232	Vehari-IV	Vehari	Pakistan Tehreek-e-Insaf	Muhammad Ejaz Hussain	15 August 2018
233	Vehari-V	Vehari	Pakistan Tehreek-e-Insaf	Rai Zahoor Ahmad	15 August 2018
234	Vehari-VI	Vehari	Pakistan Muslim League (N)	Mian Muhammad Saqib Khurshid	15 August 2018
235	Vehari-VII	Vehari	Pakistan Tehreek-e-Insaf	Muhammad Ali Raza Khan Khakwani	15 August 2018
236	Vehari-VIII	Vehari	Pakistan Tehreek-e-Insaf	Muhammad Jahanzaib Khan Khichi	15 August 2018
237	Bahawalnagar-I	Bahawalnagar	Pakistan Muslim League (N)	Mian Fida Hussain Wattoo	21 July 2022
238	Bahawalnagar-II	Bahawalnagar	Pakistan Tehreek-e-Insaf	Shoukat Ali Laleka	15 August 2018
239	Bahawalnagar-III	Bahawalnagar	Pakistan Muslim League (N)	Rana Abdul Rauf	15 August 2018
240	Bahawalnagar-IV	Bahawalnagar	Pakistan Muslim League (N)	Chaudhry Muhammad Jameel	15 August 2018
241	Bahawalnagar-V	Bahawalnagar	Pakistan Tehreek-e-Insaf	Malik Muhammad Muzaffar Khan	27 October 2022
242	Bahawalnagar-VI	Bahawalnagar	Pakistan Muslim League (N)	Chaudhry Zahid Akram	15 August 2018
243	Bahawalnagar-VII	Bahawalnagar	Pakistan Muslim League (N)	Chaudhry Mazhar Iqbal	15 August 2018
244	Bahawalnagar-VIII	Bahawalnagar	Pakistan Muslim League (N)	Chaudhry Muhammad Arshad	15 August 2018
245	Bahawalpur-I	Bahawalpur	Pakistan Muslim League (N)	Zaheer Iqbal Channar	15 August 2018
246	Bahawalpur-II	Bahawalpur	Pakistan Tehreek-e-Insaf	Samiullah Chaudhry	15 August 2018
247	Bahawalpur-III	Bahawalpur	Pakistan Muslim League (N)	Muhammad Kazim Ali Pirzada	15 August 2018
248	Bahawalpur-IV	Bahawalpur	Pakistan Muslim League (N)	Muhammad Afzal Gill	15 August 2018
249	Bahawalpur-V	Bahawalpur	Pakistan Muslim League (Q)	Ehsan-ul-Haque Chaudhry	15 August 2018
250	Bahawalpur-VI	Bahawalpur	Pakistan Muslim League (Q)	Muhammad Afzal Chaudhry	15 August 2018
251	Bahawalpur-VII	Bahawalpur	Pakistan Muslim League (N)	Malik Khalid Mehmood Babar	15 August 2018
252	Bahawalpur-VIII	Bahawalpur	Pakistan Muslim League (N)	Mian Muhammad Shoaib Awaisi	15 August 2018
253	Bahawalpur-IX	Bahawalpur	Pakistan Tehreek-e-Insaf	Sahibzada Muhammad Gazain Abbasi	15 August 2018
254	Bahawalpur-X	Bahawalpur	Pakistan Tehreek-e-Insaf	Makhdoom Syed Iftikhar Hassan Gillani	15 August 2018
255	Rahim Yar Khan-I	Rahim Yar Khan	Pakistan Peoples Party	Sardar Ghaznafar Ali Khan	15 August 2018
256	Rahim Yar Khan-II	Rahim Yar Khan	Pakistan Tehreek-e-Insaf	Muhammad Aamir Nawaz Khan	15 August 2018
257	Rahim Yar Khan-III	Rahim Yar Khan	Pakistan Tehreek-e-Insaf	Chaudhry Masood Ahmad	15 August 2018
258	Rahim Yar Khan-IV	Rahim Yar Khan	Pakistan Tehreek-e-Insaf	Mian Shafi Muhammad	15 August 2018
259	Rahim Yar Khan-V	Rahim Yar Khan	Pakistan Tehreek-e-Insaf	Makhdoom Hashim Jawan Bakht	15 August 2018
260	Rahim Yar Khan-VI	Rahim Yar Khan	Pakistan Muslim League (N)	Muhammad Arshad Javed	15 August 2018
261	Rahim Yar Khan-VII	Rahim Yar Khan	Pakistan Tehreek-e-Insaf	Makhdoom Fawaz Ahmed Hashmi	22 October 2018
262	Rahim Yar Khan-VIII	Rahim Yar Khan	Pakistan Tehreek-e-Insaf	Chaudhry Asif Majeed	15 August 2018
263	Rahim Yar Khan-IX	Rahim Yar Khan	Pakistan Tehreek-e-Insaf	Chaudhry Muhammad Shafique	15 August 2018
264	Rahim Yar Khan-X	Rahim Yar Khan	Pakistan Peoples Party	Syed Usman Mehmood	15 August 2018
265	Rahim Yar Khan-XI	Rahim Yar Khan	Pakistan Peoples Party	Rais Nabeel Ahmad	15 August 2018
266	Rahim Yar Khan-XII	Rahim Yar Khan	Pakistan Peoples Party	Mumtaz Ali Khan Chang	15 August 2018
267	Rahim Yar Khan-XIII	Rahim Yar Khan	Pakistan Muslim League (N)	Chaudhry Muhammad Shafiq Anwar	15 August 2018
268	Muzaffargarh-I	Muzaffargarh	Pakistan Muslim League (N)	Malik Ghulam Qasim Hanjra	15 August 2018
269	Muzaffargarh-II	Muzaffargarh	Pakistan Muslim League (N)	Azhar Abbas Chandia	15 August 2018
270	Muzaffargarh-III	Muzaffargarh	Pakistan Tehreek-e-Insaf	Abdul Hayi Dasti	15 August 2018
271	Muzaffargarh-IV	Muzaffargarh	Pakistan Tehreek-e-Insaf	Nawabzada Mansoor Ahmed Khan	15 August 2018
272	Muzaffargarh-V	Muzaffargarh	Pakistan Tehreek-e-Insaf	Moazzam Khan Jatoi	21 July 2022
273	Muzaffargarh-VI	Muzaffargarh	Pakistan Muslim League (N)	Syed Muhammad Sibtain Raza	21 July 2022
274	Muzaffargarh-VII	Muzaffargarh	Pakistan Tehreek-e-Insaf	Muhammad Raza Hussain Bukhari	15 August 2018
275	Muzaffargarh-VIII	Muzaffargarh	Pakistan Tehreek-e-Insaf	Khurrum Sohail Khan Laghari	15 August 2018
276	Muzaffargarh-IX	Muzaffargarh	Pakistan Tehreek-e-Insaf	Muhammad Aoon Hamid	15 August 2018
277	Muzaffargarh-X	Muzaffargarh	Pakistan Tehreek-e-Insaf	Mian Alamdar Abbas Qureshi	15 August 2018
278	Muzaffargarh-XI	Muzaffargarh	Pakistan Tehreek-e-Insaf	Niaz Hussain Khan	15 August 2018
279	Muzaffargarh-XII	Muzaffargarh	Pakistan Tehreek-e-Insaf	Muhammad Ashraf Khan Rind	15 August 2018
280	Layyah-I	Layyah	Independent	Malik Ahmad Ali Aulakh	15 August 2018
281	Layyah-II	Layyah	Pakistan Tehreek-e-Insaf	Sardar Shahab-ud-Din Khan	15 August 2018
282	Layyah-III	Layyah	Pakistan Tehreek-e-Insaf	Qaiser Abbas Magsi	21 July 2022
283	Layyah-IV	Layyah	Pakistan Muslim League (N)	Mahar Ijaz Ahmad Achlana	15 August 2018
284	Layyah-V	Layyah	Pakistan Tehreek-e-Insaf	Syed Rafaqat Ali Gillani	15 August 2018
285	Dera Ghazi Khan-I	Dera Ghazi Khan	Pakistan Tehreek-e-Insaf	Khawaja Muhammad Dawood Sulemani	15 August 2018
286	Dera Ghazi Khan-II	Dera Ghazi Khan	Pakistan Tehreek-e-Insaf	Usman Ahmad Khan Buzdar	15 August 2018
287	Dera Ghazi Khan-III	Dera Ghazi Khan	Pakistan Tehreek-e-Insaf	Javed Akhtar Khan Lund	15 August 2018
288	Dera Ghazi Khan-IV	Dera Ghazi Khan	Pakistan Tehreek-e-Insaf	Muhammad Saif-ud-Din Khosa	21 July 2022
289	Dera Ghazi Khan-V	Dera Ghazi Khan	Pakistan Tehreek-e-Insaf	Hanif Khan Pitafi	15 August 2018
290	Dera Ghazi Khan-VI	Dera Ghazi Khan	Pakistan Tehreek-e-Insaf	Ahmad Ali Khan Dreshak	15 August 2018
291	Dera Ghazi Khan-VII	Dera Ghazi Khan	Pakistan Tehreek-e-Insaf	Sardar Muhammad Mohiuddin Khosa	15 August 2018
292	Dera Ghazi Khan-VIII	Dera Ghazi Khan	Pakistan Muslim League (N)	Awais Leghari	24 October 2018
293	Rajanpur-I	Rajanpur	Pakistan Tehreek-e-Insaf	Muhammad Mohsin Khan Leghari	15 August 2018
294	Rajanpur-II	Rajanpur	Pakistan Tehreek-e-Insaf	Sardar Hasnain Bahadar Dreshak	15 August 2018
295	Rajanpur-III	Rajanpur	Pakistan Tehreek-e-Insaf	Sardar Farooq Amanullah Dreshak	15 August 2018
296	Rajanpur-IV	Rajanpur	Pakistan Tehreek-e-Insaf	Awais Dareshak	4 October 2018
297	Rajanpur-V	Rajanpur	Pakistan Tehreek-e-Insaf	Dost Muhammad Mazari	15 August 2018
331	Reserved - Women	Reserved for Women	Pakistan Muslim League (N)	Zakia Shahnawaz Khan	15 August 2018
332	Reserved - Women	Reserved for Women	Pakistan Muslim League (N)	Mehwish Sultana	15 August 2018
333	Reserved - Women	Reserved for Women	Pakistan Muslim League (N)	Azma Zahid Bukhari	15 August 2018
334	Reserved - Women	Reserved for Women	Pakistan Muslim League (N)	Begum Ishrat Ashraf	15 August 2018
335	Reserved - Women	Reserved for Women	Pakistan Muslim League (N)	Sadia Nadeem Malik	15 August 2018
336	Reserved - Women	Reserved for Women	Pakistan Muslim League (N)	Hina Pervaiz Butt	15 August 2018
337	Reserved - Women	Reserved for Women	Pakistan Muslim League (N)	Sania Ashiq	15 August 2018
338	Reserved - Women	Reserved for Women	Pakistan Muslim League (N)	Tahia Noon	15 August 2018
339	Reserved - Women	Reserved for Women	Pakistan Muslim League (N)	Uswah Aftab	15 August 2018
340	Reserved - Women	Reserved for Women	Pakistan Muslim League (N)	Saba Sadiq	15 August 2018
341	Reserved - Women	Reserved for Women	Pakistan Muslim League (N)	Kanwal Pervaiz	15 August 2018
342	Reserved - Women	Reserved for Women	Pakistan Muslim League (N)	Gulnaz Shahzadi	15 August 2018
343	Reserved - Women	Reserved for Women	Pakistan Muslim League (N)	Rabia Nusrat	15 August 2018
344	Reserved - Women	Reserved for Women	Pakistan Muslim League (N)	Haseena Begum	15 August 2018
345	Reserved - Women	Reserved for Women	Pakistan Muslim League (N)	Rahat Afza	15 August 2018
346	Reserved - Women	Reserved for Women	Pakistan Muslim League (N)	Salma Butt	25 January 2021
347	Reserved - Women	Reserved for Women	Pakistan Muslim League (N)	Rukhsana Kausar	15 August 2018
348	Reserved - Women	Reserved for Women	Pakistan Muslim League (N)	Salma Saadia Taimoor	15 August 2018
349	Reserved - Women	Reserved for Women	Pakistan Muslim League (N)	Khalida Mansoor	15 August 2018
350	Reserved - Women	Reserved for Women	Pakistan Muslim League (N)	Rabia Ahmed Butt	15 August 2018
351	Reserved - Women	Reserved for Women	Pakistan Muslim League (N)	Rabia Naseem Farooqi	15 August 2018
352	Reserved - Women	Reserved for Women	Pakistan Muslim League (N)	Faiza Mushtaq	15 August 2018
353	Reserved - Women	Reserved for Women	Pakistan Muslim League (N)	Bushra Anjum Butt	15 August 2018
354	Reserved - Women	Reserved for Women	Pakistan Muslim League (N)	Uzma Qadri	4 October 2018
355	Reserved - Women	Reserved for Women	Pakistan Muslim League (N)	Sumera Komal	15 August 2018
356	Reserved - Women	Reserved for Women	Pakistan Muslim League (N)	Raheela Naeem	15 August 2018
357	Reserved - Women	Reserved for Women	Pakistan Muslim League (N)	Sumbal Malik Hussain	15 August 2018
358	Reserved - Women	Reserved for Women	Pakistan Muslim League (N)	Aneeza Fatima	15 August 2018
359	Reserved - Women	Reserved for Women	Pakistan Muslim League (N)	Nafisa Ameen	4 October 2018
360	Reserved - Women	Reserved for Women	Pakistan Muslim League (N)	Zaib un Nisa Awan	15 August 2018
298	Reserved - Women	Reserved for Women	Pakistan Tehreek-e-Insaf	Yasmin Rashid	15 August 2018
299	Reserved - Women	Reserved for Women	Pakistan Tehreek-e-Insaf	Sadiqa Sahibdad	15 August 2018
300	Reserved - Women	Reserved for Women	Pakistan Tehreek-e-Insaf	Shamsa Ali	15 August 2018
301	Reserved - Women	Reserved for Women	Pakistan Tehreek-e-Insaf	Nasrin Tariq	15 August 2018
302	Reserved - Women	Reserved for Women	Pakistan Tehreek-e-Insaf	Shawana Bashir	15 August 2018
303	Reserved - Women	Reserved for Women	Pakistan Tehreek-e-Insaf	Shamim Aftab	15 August 2018
304	Reserved - Women	Reserved for Women	Pakistan Tehreek-e-Insaf	Firdous Rahna	15 August 2018
305	Reserved - Women	Reserved for Women	Pakistan Tehreek-e-Insaf	Shahida Ahmed	15 August 2018
306	Reserved - Women	Reserved for Women	Pakistan Tehreek-e-Insaf	Sumaira Ahmed	15 August 2018
307	Reserved - Women	Reserved for Women	Pakistan Tehreek-e-Insaf	Syeda Zehra Naqvi	15 August 2018
308	Reserved - Women	Reserved for Women	Pakistan Tehreek-e-Insaf	Ayesha Iqbal	15 August 2018
309	Reserved - Women	Reserved for Women	Pakistan Tehreek-e-Insaf	Neelum Hayat Malik	15 August 2018
310	Reserved - Women	Reserved for Women	Pakistan Tehreek-e-Insaf	Umul Banin Ali	15 August 2018
311	Reserved - Women	Reserved for Women	Pakistan Tehreek-e-Insaf	Batool Zain	6 July 2022
312	Reserved - Women	Reserved for Women	Pakistan Tehreek-e-Insaf	Musarrat Jamshed	15 August 2018
313	Reserved - Women	Reserved for Women	Pakistan Tehreek-e-Insaf	Saadia Sohail Rana	15 August 2018
314	Reserved - Women	Reserved for Women	Pakistan Tehreek-e-Insaf	Rashida Khanum	15 August 2018
315	Reserved - Women	Reserved for Women	Pakistan Tehreek-e-Insaf	Farhat Farooq	15 August 2018
316	Reserved - Women	Reserved for Women	Pakistan Tehreek-e-Insaf	Sania Kamran	12 June 2020
317	Reserved - Women	Reserved for Women	Pakistan Tehreek-e-Insaf	Talat Fatemeh Naqvi	15 August 2018
318	Reserved - Women	Reserved for Women	Pakistan Tehreek-e-Insaf	Shaheena Karim	15 August 2018
319	Reserved - Women	Reserved for Women	Pakistan Tehreek-e-Insaf	Asia Amjad	15 August 2018
320	Reserved - Women	Reserved for Women	Pakistan Tehreek-e-Insaf	Seemabia Tahir	15 August 2018
321	Reserved - Women	Reserved for Women	Pakistan Tehreek-e-Insaf	Momina Waheed	15 August 2018
322	Reserved - Women	Reserved for Women	Pakistan Tehreek-e-Insaf	Saira Raza	6 July 2022
323	Reserved - Women	Reserved for Women	Pakistan Tehreek-e-Insaf	Zainab Umair	15 August 2018
324	Reserved - Women	Reserved for Women	Pakistan Tehreek-e-Insaf	Farah Agha	15 August 2018
325	Reserved - Women	Reserved for Women	Pakistan Tehreek-e-Insaf	Syed Farah Azmi	15 August 2018
326	Reserved - Women	Reserved for Women	Pakistan Tehreek-e-Insaf	Sajida Begum	15 August 2018
327	Reserved - Women	Reserved for Women	Pakistan Tehreek-e-Insaf	Fouzia Abbas Naeem	6 July 2022
328	Reserved - Women	Reserved for Women	Pakistan Tehreek-e-Insaf	Sabeen Gul Khan	15 August 2018
329	Reserved - Women	Reserved for Women	Pakistan Tehreek-e-Insaf	Sabrina Javaid	15 August 2018
330	Reserved - Women	Reserved for Women	Pakistan Tehreek-e-Insaf	Abida Bibi	15 August 2018
361	Reserved - Women	Reserved for Women	Pakistan Muslim League (Q)	Basma Riaz Choudhry	15 August 2018
362	Reserved - Women	Reserved for Women	Pakistan Muslim League (Q)	Khadija Umar	15 August 2018
363	Reserved - Women	Reserved for Women	Pakistan Peoples Party	Shazia Abid	15 August 2018
364	Reserved - Non-Muslims	Reserved for Non-Muslims	Pakistan Tehreek-e-Insaf	Habkook Rafiq Babbu	6 July 2022
365	Reserved - Non-Muslims	Reserved for Non-Muslims	Pakistan Tehreek-e-Insaf	Samuel Yaqoob	6 July 2022
366	Reserved - Non-Muslims	Reserved for Non-Muslims	Pakistan Tehreek-e-Insaf	Mahindar Pall Singh	15 August 2018
367	Reserved - Non-Muslims	Reserved for Non-Muslims	Pakistan Tehreek-e-Insaf	Youdester Chohan	19 November 2021
368	Reserved - Non-Muslims	Reserved for Non-Muslims	Pakistan Muslim League (N)	Khalil Tahir Sandhu	15 August 2018
369	Reserved - Non-Muslims	Reserved for Non-Muslims	Pakistan Muslim League (N)	Joyce Rofin Julius	15 August 2018
370	Reserved - Non-Muslims	Reserved for Non-Muslims	Pakistan Muslim League (N)	Ramesh Singh Arora	23 January 2020
371	Reserved - Non-Muslims	Reserved for Non-Muslims	Pakistan Muslim League (N)	Tariq Masih Gill	15 August 2018

== Membership changes ==
Constituency	Incumbent previously elected			Incumbent elected in by-election		Ref.
Constituency	Member	Political party	Notes	Political Party	Member	Ref.
PP-168 (Lahore-XXV)	Khawaja Saad Rafique	Pakistan Muslim League (N)	He was elected in the July 2018 provincial election. He was elected to the National Assembly in October 2018.	Pakistan Tehreek-e-Insaf	Malik Asad Ali Khokhar	
PP-218 (Multan-VIII)	Malik Mazhar Abbas Raan	Pakistan Tehreek-e-Insaf	He was elected the July 2018 provincial election. He died in January 2019.	Pakistan Tehreek-e-Insaf	Malik Wasif Mazhar Raan	
PP-123 (Toba Tek Singh-VI)	Syed Qutab Ali Shah	Pakistan Muslim League (N)	He was elected in the July 2018 provincial election. He was de-seated in February 2019 due to a recount in his constituency.	Pakistan Tehreek-e-Insaf	Syeda Sonia Ali Raza	
Reserved seat for non-Muslims	Munir Masih Khokhar	Pakistan Muslim League (N)	He was elected in the July 2018 provincial election. He died in December 2019.	Pakistan Muslim League (N)	Ramesh Singh Arora	
Reserved seat for women	Shaheen Raza	Pakistan Tehreek-e-Insaf	She was elected in the July 2018 provincial election. She died in May 2020 due to COVID-19.	Pakistan Tehreek-e-Insaf	Sania Kamran	
PP-51 (Gujranwala-I)	Shaukat Manzoor Cheema	Pakistan Muslim League (N)	He was elected in the July 2018 provincial election. He died in June 2020 due to COVID-19.	Pakistan Muslim League (N)	Tallat Mehmood	
Reserved seat for women	Munira Yamin Satti	Pakistan Muslim League (N)	She was elected in the July 2018 general election. She died in January 2021 due to COVID-19.	Pakistan Muslim League (N)	Salma Butt	
PP-84 (Khushab-III)	Muhammad Waris Shad	Pakistan Muslim League (N)	He was elected in the July 2018 provincial election. He died in March 2021.	Pakistan Muslim League (N)	Muhammad Moazzam Sher	
PP-38 (Sialkot-IV)	Choudhary Khush Akhtar Subhani	Pakistan Muslim League (N)	He was elected in the July 2018 provincial election. He died in May 2021.	Pakistan Tehreek-e-Insaf	Ahsan Saleem	
Reserved seat for non-Muslims	Peter Gill	Pakistan Tehreek-e-Insaf	He was elected in the July 2018 provincial election. He died in October 2021.	Pakistan Tehreek-e-Insaf	Youdester Chohan	
PP-206 (Khanewal-IV)	Nishat Khan Daha	Pakistan Muslim League (N)	He was elected in the July 2018 provincial election. He died in October 2022.	Pakistan Muslim League (N)	Rana Muhammad Saleem	
Reserved seat for women	Uzma Kardar	Pakistan Tehreek-e-Insaf	She was elected in the July 2018 provincial election. She was de-seated in May 2022.	Pakistan Tehreek-e-Insaf	Batool Zain	
Reserved seat for women	Aisha Nawaz	Pakistan Tehreek-e-Insaf	She was elected in the July 2018 provincial election. She was de-seated in May 2022.	Pakistan Tehreek-e-Insaf	Saira Raza	
Reserved seat for women	Sajida Yousaf	Pakistan Tehreek-e-Insaf	She was elected in the July 2018 provincial election. She was de-seated in May 2022.	Pakistan Tehreek-e-Insaf	Fouzia Abbas Naeem	
Reserved seat for non-Muslims	Haroon Imran Gill	Pakistan Tehreek-e-Insaf	She was elected in the July 2018 provincial election. He was de-seated in May 2022.	Pakistan Tehreek-e-Insaf	Habkook Rafiq Babbu	
Reserved seat for non-Muslims	Ijaz Masih	Pakistan Tehreek-e-Insaf	He was elected in the July 2018 provincial election. He was de-seated in May 2022.	Pakistan Tehreek-e-Insaf	Samuel Yaqoob	
PP-7 (Rawalpindi-II)	Raja Sagheer Ahmed	Pakistan Tehreek-e-Insaf	He was elected in the July 2018 provincial election. He was de-seated in May 2022.	Pakistan Muslim League (N)	Raja Sagheer Ahmed	
PP-83 (Khushab-II)	Malik Ghulam Rasool Sangha	Pakistan Tehreek-e-Insaf	He was elected in the July 2018 provincial election. He was de-seated in May 2022.	Pakistan Tehreek-e-Insaf	Hasan Aslam Awan	
PP-90 (Bhakkar-II)	Saeed Akbar Khan	Pakistan Tehreek-e-Insaf	He was elected in the July 2018 provincial election. He was de-seated in May 2022.	Pakistan Tehreek-e-Insaf	Irfan Ullah Khan Niazi	
PP-97 (Faisalabad-I)	Muhammad Ajmal Cheema	Pakistan Tehreek-e-Insaf	He was elected in the July 2018 provincial election. He was de-seated in May 2022.	Pakistan Tehreek-e-Insaf	Ali Afzal Sahi	
PP-125 (Jhang-II)	Faisal Hayat Jabboana	Pakistan Tehreek-e-Insaf	He was elected in the July 2018 provincial election. He was de-seated in May 2022.	Pakistan Tehreek-e-Insaf	Mian Muhammad Azam Cheela	
PP-127 (Jhang-IV)	Mehar Muhammad Aslam Bharwana	Pakistan Tehreek-e-Insaf	He was elected in the July 2018 provincial election. He was de-seated in May 2022.	Pakistan Tehreek-e-Insaf	Mehar Muhammad Nawaz	
PP-140 (Sheikhupura-VI)	Mian Khalid Mehmood	Pakistan Tehreek-e-Insaf	He was elected in the July 2018 provincial election. He was de-seated in May 2022.	Pakistan Tehreek-e-Insaf	Khurram Shahzad Virk	
PP-158 (Lahore-XV)	Aleem Khan	Pakistan Tehreek-e-Insaf	He was elected in the July 2018 provincial election. He was de-seated in May 2022.	Pakistan Tehreek-e-Insaf	Mian Akram Usman	
PP-167 (Lahore-XXIV)	Nazir Ahmad Chohan	Pakistan Tehreek-e-Insaf	He was elected in the July 2018 provincial election. He was de-seated in May 2022.	Pakistan Tehreek-e-Insaf	Shabbir Gujjar	
PP-168 (Lahore-XXV)	Malik Asad Ali Khokhar	Pakistan Tehreek-e-Insaf	He was elected in a December 2018 by-election. He was de-seated in May 2022.	Pakistan Muslim League (N)	Malik Asad Ali Khokhar	
PP-170 (Lahore-XXVII)	Muhammad Amin Zulqernain	Pakistan Tehreek-e-Insaf	He was elected in the July 2018 provincial election. He was de-seated in May 2022.	Pakistan Tehreek-e-Insaf	Malik Zaheer Abbas	
PP-202 (Sahiwal-VII)	Nauman Ahmad Langrial	Pakistan Tehreek-e-Insaf	He was elected in the July 2018 provincial election. He was de-seated in May 2022.	Pakistan Tehreek-e-Insaf	Muhammad Ghulam Sarwar	
PP-217 (Multan-VII)	Muhammad Salman Naeem	Pakistan Tehreek-e-Insaf	He was elected in the July 2018 provincial election. He was de-seated in May 2022.	Pakistan Tehreek-e-Insaf	Zain Qureshi	
PP-224 (Lodhran-I)	Zawar Hussain Warraich	Pakistan Tehreek-e-Insaf	He was elected in the July 2018 provincial election. He was de-seated in May 2022.	Pakistan Tehreek-e-Insaf	Muhammad Aamir Iqbal Shah	
PP-228 (Lodhran-V)	Nazir Ahmad Khan	Pakistan Tehreek-e-Insaf	He was elected in the July 2018 provincial election. He was de-seated in May 2022.	Independent	Syed Rafi Uddin	
PP-237 (Bahawalnagar-I)	Mian Fida Hussain Wattoo	Pakistan Tehreek-e-Insaf	He was elected in the July 2018 provincial election. He was de-seated in May 2022.	Pakistan Muslim League (N)	Mian Fida Hussain Wattoo	
PP-272 (Muzaffargarh-V)	Zehra Batool	Pakistan Tehreek-e-Insaf	He was elected in the July 2018 provincial election. He was de-seated in May 2022.	Pakistan Tehreek-e-Insaf	Muhammad Moazam Ali Khan Jatoi	
PP-273 (Muzaffargarh-VI)	Syed Muhammad Sibtain Raza	Pakistan Tehreek-e-Insaf	He was elected in the July 2018 provincial election. He was de-seated in May 2022.	Pakistan Muslim League (N)	Syed Muhammad Sibtain Raza	
PP-282 (Layyah-III)	Muhammad Tahir Randhawa	Pakistan Tehreek-e-Insaf	He was elected in the July 2018 provincial election. He was de-seated in May 2022.	Pakistan Tehreek-e-Insaf	Qaisar Abbas Khan Magsi	
PP-288 (Dera Ghazi Khan-III)	Mohsin Atta Khan Khosa	Pakistan Tehreek-e-Insaf	He was elected in the July 2018 provincial election. He was de-seated in May 2022.	Pakistan Tehreek-e-Insaf	Muhammad Saif-ud-Din Khosa	
PP-139 (Sheikhupura-V)	Mian Jaleel Ahmed	Pakistan Muslim League (N)	He was elected in the July 2018 provincial election. He resigned in July 2022.	Pakistan Muslim League (N)	Chaudhry Iftikhar Ahmad Bhangoo	
PP-209 (Khanewal-VII)	Muhammad Faisal Khan Niazi	Pakistan Muslim League (N)	He was elected in the July 2018 provincial election. He resigned in July 2022.	Pakistan Tehreek-e-Insaf	Muhammad Faisal Khan Niazi	
PP-241 (Bahawalnagar-V)	Chaudhry Kashif Mahmood	Pakistan Muslim League (N)	He was elected in the July 2018 provincial election. He was de-seated in July 2022.	Pakistan Tehreek-e-Insaf	Malik Muhammad Muzaffar Khan	
