= Daska =

Daska: ڈسکا (Punjabi); ڈسکہ (Urdu)
- City
- Daska
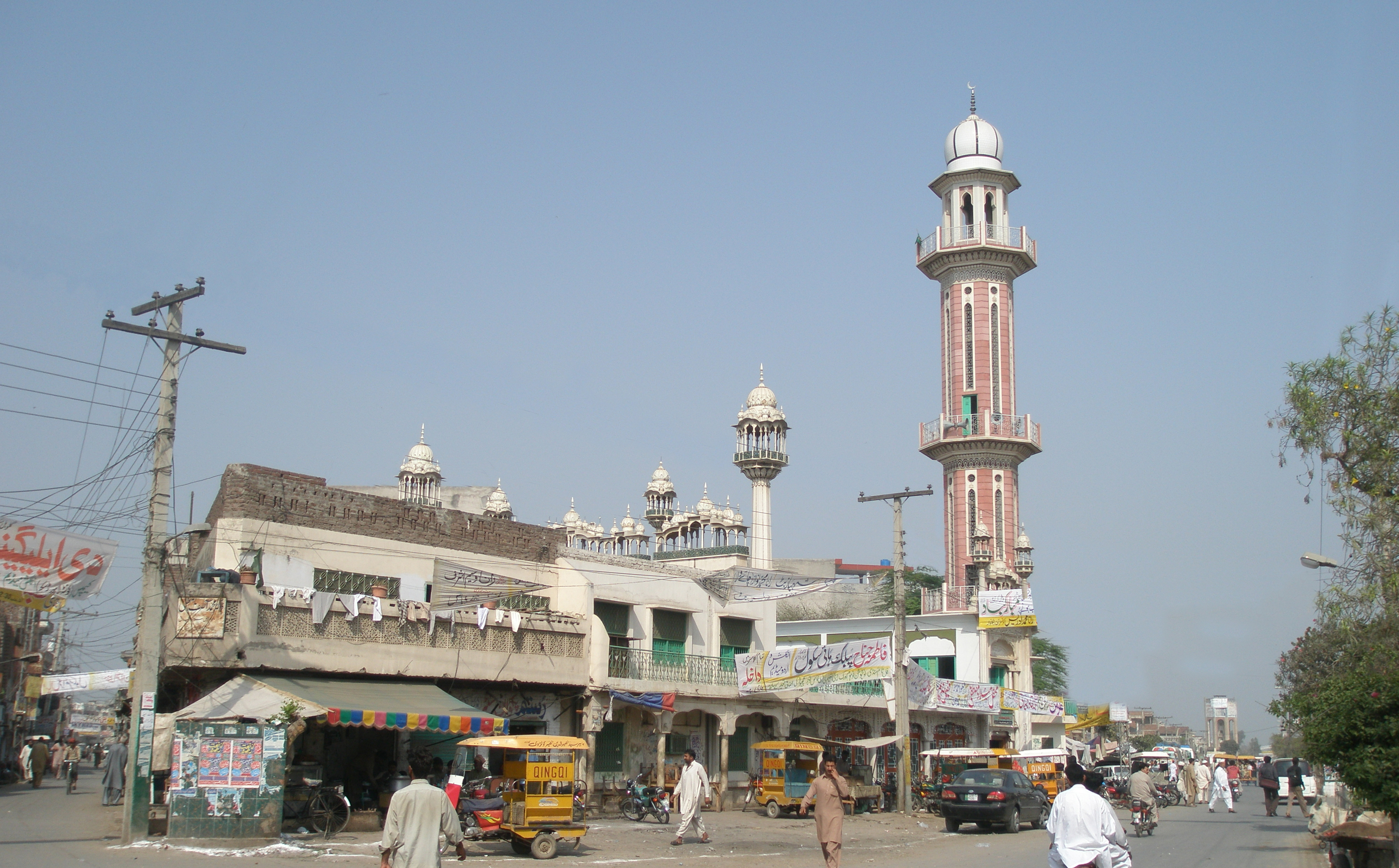

- Location within Punjab, Pakistan Location within Pakistan
- Coordinates: 32°20′N 74°21′E
- Country: Pakistan
- Province: (Punjab, Pakistan) Punjab
- Division: Gujranwala
- District: Sialkot
- Tehsil: Daska

Government
  - Type: Municipal Committee
  - Administrator / Chairman: Sadia Jaffar (Assistant Commissioner)
  - Chief Officer: Ulfat Shahzad
  - MNA(s): Syeda Nosheen Iftikhar (NA-69 (Sialkot-IV))
  - MPA(s): Zeeshan Rafique (PP-42 (Sialkot-VIII)); Chaudhry Naveed Ashraf (PP-43 (Sialkot-IX))
- Elevation: 217 m (712 ft)

Population (2023)
  - City: 175,170
  - Rank: 44th in Pakistan
- Time zone: UTC+5 (PST)
- Calling code: 052
- Number of towns: 1
- Postal Code: 51010

Daska (Punjabi: ڈسکا; Urdu: ڈسکہ) is a city in Punjab, Pakistan, serving as the headquarters of the Daska Tehsil. It is one of the four tehsils of Sialkot District.

== Demographics ==
=== Population ===
Historical population

| Year | Pop. | ±% p.a. |
|---|---|---|
| 1951 | 15,375 | — |
| 1961 | 20,406 | +2.87% |
| 1972 | 34,487 | +4.89% |
| 1981 | 55,555 | +5.44% |

| Year | Pop. | ±% p.a. |
|---|---|---|
| 1998 | 102,883 | +3.69% |
| 2017 | 175,170 | +2.84% |
| 2023 | 228,626 | +4.54% |

According to the 2023 census, Daska had a population of 228,626.

Languages

Languages of Daska MC (2023 Census)
1. Punjabi (87.9%)
2. Urdu (10.6%)
3. Pashto (1.20%)
4. Others (0.30%)

Punjabis form an ethnic majority in the city, belonging to different tribes — Punjabi–Kashmiris, Mughals/Mirza and Rajputs are dominant in the urban area; with several Gujjar and Jatt clans being dominant in the rural areas. Tribes such as the Awan, Arain, Khokhar, and Gakhar are also present in smaller numbers.

A significant Pashtun population, mostly from the Kakazai tribe, is found in urban and rural areas, having migrated centuries ago. There are also a significant number of the ethnic Mewati people from Haryana, having migrated there during the partition of India.

== History ==
=== 17th-19th centuries ===
Daska was founded during the reign of Shah Jahan, and was initially named Shah Jahanabad, according to Mughal revenue records. It was later renamed Daska as it is das ("ten") koh (Mughal unit of distance) from Sialkot, Pasrur, Gujranwala, and Wazirabad. During the Afghan Durrani invasion of the 18th century, Daska was ruined, and its inhabitants were forced to seek shelter in the nearby mud fort of Kot Daska. Daska was later repopulated during the Sikh era. Daska was captured by Ranjit Singh in 1802 and made part of the Sikh Empire.

=== 20th century ===
In 1929, Daska was the site of Hindu-Sikh riots when Akali Sikhs attempted to seize control of Gurdwara Sant Wayaram Singh. The local Hindu community claimed it was originally built to be a Hindu temple.

In August 1947, 5,000 refugees from surrounding areas gathered at Daska Camp for two weeks before being escorted to the Indian border by the Pakistan Army.

=== 21st century ===
In January 2025, the Government of Punjab demolished the Ahmadi worship building constructed by Muhammad Zafarullah Khan.

== Notable people ==
- Fazal Idaho (born 1948) - Pakistani politician
