= Bao Muhammad Rizwan =

Pakistani politician

Bao Muhammad Rizwan Rehmani

Provincial Minister of Punjab for Environment Protection
- In office 9 February 2019 – April 2022

Member of the Provincial Assembly of the Punjab
- In office 15 August 2018 – 14 January 2023
- Constituency: PP-41 Sialkot-VII

Personal details
- Party: PTI (2023-present)
- Other political affiliations: PML(Q) (2018-2023)

Bao Muhammad Rizwan Rehamani is a Pakistani politician who was the Provincial Minister of Punjab for Environment Protection, in office from February 2019 till April 2022. He had been a Member of the Provincial Assembly of the Punjab from August 2018 till January 2023.

== Political career ==
He was elected to the Provincial Assembly of the Punjab as a candidate of Pakistan Muslim League (Q) (PML(Q)) from PP-41 (Sialkot-VII) in the 2018 Punjab provincial election.

On 9 February 2019, he was appointed Provincial Minister of Punjab for Environment Protection in the cabinet of Chief Minister Usman Buzdar.

On 21 February 2023, after the dissolution of the Provincial Assembly, Rizwan, along with the former Chief Minister Chaudhry Pervaiz Elahi and eight other former PML(Q) MPAs, joined the Pakistan Tehreek-e-Insaf (PTI).

He ran for a seat in the Provincial Assembly from PP-42 Sialkot-VIII as a candidate of the PTI in the 2024 Punjab provincial election.
