= Muhammad Hashim Dogar =

Pakistani politician

Provincial Minister of Punjab for Home and Prisons
- In office 6 August 2022 – 11 October 2022
- Minister: Population and welfare
- Chief Minister: Chaudhry Pervaiz Elahi
- Governor: Muhammad Baligh Ur Rehman
- Preceded by: Attaullah Tarar
- Succeeded by: Omer Sarfraz Cheema

Member of the Provincial Assembly of the Punjab
- In office 27 August 2018
- In office 15 August 2018 – 30 March 2022
- Constituency: PP-177 Kasur-IV

Provincial Minister of Punjab for Irrigation
- In office 14 October 2022 – 14 January 2023

Personal details
- Born: 28 June 1969 (age 57)
- Party: TLP (2025–present)
- Other political affiliations: IPP (2023–2025); PTI (2018–2023)

Muhammad Hashim Dogar is a Pakistani politician who had served as Provincial Minister of Punjab for Home and Prisons from 6 August 2022 to 11 October 2022. He had also served as the Provincial Minister of Punjab for Population Welfare from 6 September 2018 to 1 April 2022. He served in the Pakistan Army for 26 years. He served in an infantry battalion and later in the intelligence corps.

He is from Jamsher Kalan, Kanganpur Tehsil Chunian, Kasur.

== Political career ==
He was elected to the Provincial Assembly of the Punjab as a candidate of the Pakistan Tehreek-e-Insaf from PP-177 (Kasur-IV) in the 2018 Punjab provincial election.

On 27 August 2018, he was inducted into the provincial Punjab cabinet of Chief Minister Sardar Usman Buzdar without any ministerial portfolio. On 6 September 2018, he was appointed Provincial Minister of Punjab for Population Welfare. He served in this position till the resignation of Chief Minister Usman Buzdar on 1 April 2022.

He was later inducted into the cabinet of Chief Minister Chaudhry Pervaiz Elahi as the Provincial Minister of Punjab for Home and Prisons on 6 August 2022. He resigned from his position on 11 October 2022 due to "personal commitments and some health issues".

He left the PTI in the wake of the 2023 Pakistani protests, and on 15 August 2023, joined the Istehkam-e-Pakistan Party (IPP).

He contested the 2024 Pakistani general election as a candidate of the IPP from NA-133 Kasur-III, but was unsuccessful. He received 4,289 votes and was defeated by Azeemuddin Zahid Lakhvi, an independent candidate supported by the PTI. He also contested the 2024 Punjab provincial election as a candidate of the IPP from PP-180 Kasur-VI, but was unsuccessful. He received 21,421 votes and was defeated by Ahsan Raza Khan, an independent candidate.

He left the IPP on 11 August 2025.
