= Sheikh Allauddin =

Pakistani politician (born 1947)

Member of the Provincial Assembly of the Punjab
- In office 15 August 2018 – 14 January 2023
- Constituency: PP-178 Kasur-V
- In office 2005 – 31 May 2018

Personal details
- Born: 1 August 1947 (age 79) Karnal district, Punjab, British India

Punjab Assembly Lahore

Sheikh Allauddin is a Pakistani politician who had been a member of the Provincial Assembly of Punjab from 18 August 2018 to 14 January 2023. Previously, He was a Member of the Provincial Assembly of the Punjab, from 2005 to May 2018 and from August 2018 to January 2023. He is chairman of Ravi Group of Companies.

== Early life and education ==
He was born on 1 August 1947 in Karnal district, India.

He has a degree of Master of Arts (in Political Science where he obtained in 1970 from University of the Punjab.

== Political career ==
He was elected to the Provincial Assembly of the Punjab as a candidate of Pakistan Muslim League (Q) (PML-Q) from Constituency PP-181 (Kasur-VII) in 2005.

He was re-elected to the Provincial Assembly of the Punjab as a candidate of PML-Q from Constituency PP-181 (Kasur-VII) in the 2008 Pakistani general election.

He was re-elected to the Provincial Assembly of the Punjab as a candidate of Pakistan Muslim League (N) (PML-N) from Constituency PP-181 (Kasur-VII) in the 2013 Pakistani general election. In November 2016, he was inducted into the Punjab provincial cabinet of Chief Minister Shehbaz Sharif and was made Provincial Minister of Punjab for Industries, Commerce and Investment.

He was re-elected to Provincial Assembly of the Punjab as a candidate of PML-N from Constituency PP-178 (Kasur-V) in the 2018 Pakistani general election.

== Wealth ==
In 2019, he was found to be the richest member of the Punjab Assembly with assets worth Rs1.57 billion.
