= PP-46 Sialkot-III =

Constituency of the Punjabi Provincial Legislature, Pakistan

- Constituency for the Provincial Assembly of Punjab
- Region: Sialkot Cantt and Sialkot city (eastern) in Sialkot District

Current constituency
- Created from: PP-122 Sialkot-II (2002–2018); PP-36 Sialkot-II (2018-2023)

PP-46 Sialkot-III (پی پی-46، سيالكوٹ-3) is a Constituency of Provincial Assembly of Punjab.

== General elections 2024 ==
Provincial election 2024: PP-46 Sialkot-III
Party	Candidate	Votes	%	±%
PML(N)	Faisal Akram	55,258	42.05	
PTI	Ruba Umar (Note: Filed nomination papers as PTI candidate but ECP allowed him to run as an Independent)	47,953	36.49	
Independent	Mohammad Akhlaq	8,127	6.19	
TLP	Muhammad Atiq	4,741	3.61	
JI	Malik Munir Hussain	4,419	3.36	
Independent	Rehana Imtiaz Dar	3,165	2.41	
Others	Others (fifteen candidates)	7,736	5.89	
Turnout		134,828	43.22	
Total valid votes		131,399	97.46	
Rejected ballots		3,429	2.54	
Majority		7,305	5.56	
Registered electors		311,927		
hold				

== General elections 2018 ==
Provincial election 2018: PP-36 Sialkot-II
Party	Candidate	Votes	%	±%
PTI	Muhammad Akhlaq	51,496	46.91	
PML(N)	Muhammad Akram	42,499	38.71	
MMA	Arshad Mahmood Baggu	7,900	7.20	
TLP	Abdul Wakeel Mir	4,628	4.22	
AAT	Nouman Nazir	1,494	1.36	
Others	Others (six candidates)	1,765	1.60	
Turnout		113,365	51.80	
Total valid votes		109,782	96.84	
Rejected ballots		3,583	3.16	
Majority		8,997	8.20	
Registered electors		218,866		

== General elections 2013 ==
Provincial election 2013: PP-122 Sialkot-II
Party	Candidate	Votes	%	±%
PML(N)	Chodhary Muhammad Akram	43,167	50.70	
PTI	Mir Umer Farooq Meyer	38,283	44.97	
PPP	Aftab Khan	2,549	2.99	
Others	Others (eight candidates)	1,136	1.33	
Turnout		86,599	53.07	
Total valid votes		85,135	98.31	
Rejected ballots		1,464	1.69	
Majority		4,884	5.73	
Registered electors		163,182		

== General elections 2008 ==
Provincial election 2008 : PP-122 Sialkot-II
Party	Candidate	Votes	%	±%
PML(N)	Muhammad Akhlaq	33,959	61.60	
PPP	Raja Amer Khan	11,038	20.02	
PML(Q)	Umer Farooq Dar	9,961	18.07	
Independent	Muhammad Usman Dar	166	0.30	
Turnout		56,623	40.81	
Total valid votes		55,124	97.35	
Rejected ballots		1,499	2.65	
Majority		22,921	41.58	
Registered electors		138,756		

== See also ==
- PP-45 Sialkot-II
- PP-47 Sialkot-IV
