= PP-30 Gujrat-IV =

Constituency of the Punjabi Provincial Legislature, Pakistan

- Constituency for the Provincial Assembly of Punjab
- Region: Jalalpur Jattan Tehsil (partly) in Gujrat District

Current constituency
- Created from: PP-109 Gujrat-II (2002-2018); PP-29 Gujrat-II (2018-2023)

PP-30 Gujrat-IV (پی پی-30، گجرات-4) is a Constituency of Provincial Assembly of Punjab.

== General elections 2024 ==
Provincial election 2024: PP-30 Gujrat-IV
Party	Candidate	Votes	%	±%
PML(Q)	Muhammad Abdullah Warraich	39,037	31.05	
Independent	Tanveer Ahmed (Note: Filed nomination papers as PTI candidate but allowed him to run as an independent)	28,417	22.60	
PML(N)	Moin Nawaz Warraich	20,262	16.11	
Independent	Chaudhary Ateeq Zaman Doga	13,375	10.64	
TLP	Ali Raza	12,312	9.79	
Independent	Hafiz Atta Ur Rehman	2,615	2.08	
JI	Anas Mujahid	2,220	1.77	
Others	Others (nineteen candidates)	7,500	5.96	
Turnout		128,771	48.99	
Total valid votes		125,738	97.64	
Rejected ballots		3,033	2.36	
Majority		10,620	8.45	
Registered electors		262,845		
hold				

== 2018 Elections ==
General elections are scheduled to be held on 25 July 2018.

Provincial election 2018: PP-29 Gujrat-II
Party	Candidate	Votes	%	±%
PML(Q)	Abdullah Warraich	45,380	34.98	
PML(N)	Moeen Nawaz Warraich	30,239	23.31	
TLP	Ali Raza	17,996	13.87	
Independent	Sajid Yousaf	13,985	10.78	
Independent	Ch. Tanveer Anmad Gondal	7,818	6.03	
PPP	Farhan Mir	5,678	4.38	
AAT	Shakeel Raza	3,515	2.71	
Independent	Syed Tasawar Ul Qamar Zia	1,910	1.47	
Others	Others (eight candidates)	3,210	2.48	
Turnout		133,325	50.64	
Total valid votes		129,731	97.30	
Rejected ballots		3,594	2.70	
Majority		15,141	11.67	
Registered electors		263,298		

== 2013 Elections ==
Provincial election 2013: PP-109 Gujrat-II
Party	Candidate	Votes	%	±%
PML(N)	Major R Moeen Nawaz Warriach	39,860	40.63	
PML(Q)	Chaudhary Shafaat Hussain	36,949	37.66	
PTI	Bilal Hussain Gorsi	14,753	15.04	
Independent	Ch. Muhammad Afzaal Akber Chahci	2,154	2.20	
JI	Muhammad Mudabar Saddique	1,998	2.04	
Independent	Ch. Sarfraz Mehdi	1,000	1.02	
Others	Others (sixteen candidates)	1,388	1.41	
Turnout		100,753	52.55	
Total valid votes		98,102	97.37	
Rejected ballots		2,651	2.63	
Majority		2,911	2.97	
Registered electors		191,715		

== 2008 Elections ==
Provincial election 2008 : PP-109 Gujrat-II
Party	Candidate	Votes	%	±%
PML(Q)	Chaudhary Abdullah Yousaf	41,939	50.54	
PPP	Major (R) Moeen Nawaz Warriach	33,103	39.89	
PML(N)	Shabbir Ahmed	5,636	6.79	
Punjab National Party	Asad Ullah Warraich	2,105	2.54	
Independent	Muhammad Riaz Dar	207	0.25	
Turnout		84,213	52.41	
Total valid votes		82,990	98.55	
Rejected ballots		1,223	1.45	
Majority		8,836	10.65	
Registered electors		160,687		

== See also ==
- PP-29 Gujrat-III
- PP-31 Gujrat-V
