= Zeeshan Rafiq =

Pakistani politician

Zeeshan Rafique

Provincial Minister for Local Government and Community Development
- Incumbent
- Assumed office 7 March 2024
- Constituency: PP-42 Sialkot-VIII

Member of the Provincial Assembly of the Punjab
- Incumbent
- Assumed office 24 February 2024
- In office August 15, 2018 – 25 January 2023

Personal details
- Party: PMLN (2018-present)

Zeeshan Rafiq is a Pakistani politician who is a Member of the Provincial Assembly of the Punjab since 24 February 2024. He is currently serving as the Minister of Local Government and Community Development Department for Punjab, Pakistan in the Maryam ministry.

== Political career ==
He was elected to the Provincial Assembly of the Punjab as a candidate of Pakistan Muslim League (N) from Constituency PP-42 (Sialkot-VIII) in the 2018 Pakistani general election.

He was elected to the Provincial Assembly of the Punjab as a candidate of Pakistan Muslim League (N) from Constituency PP-51 Sialkot-VIII in the 2024 Pakistani general election.

He took the oath of Provincial Minister for Local Government and Community development in the Maryam Nawaz's Cabinet.
