= PP-47 Sialkot-IV =

Constituency of the Provincial Assembly of Punjab, Pakistan

- Constituency for the Provincial Assembly of Punjab
- Region: Sialkot city (western) in Sialkot District

Current constituency
- Created from: PP-123 Sialkot-IV (2002–2018); PP-37 Sialkot-III (2018-2023)

PP-47 Sialkot-IV (پی پی-47، سيالكوٹ-4) is a Constituency of Provincial Assembly of Punjab.

== General elections 2024 ==
Provincial election 2024: PP-47 Sialkot-IV
Party	Candidate	Votes	%	±%
PML(N)	Khawaja Muhammad Mansha Ullah	50,604	43.38	
PTI	Muhammad Kashif	44,912	38.50	
TLP	Muhammad Anser Rafique	8,437	7.23	
Independent	Shehzada Khurram Zaib	4,500	3.86	
JI	Tahir Mahmood Butt	4,048	3.47	
PMML	Sana Ullah	2,348	2.01	
Others	Others (ten candidates)	1,818	1.55	
Turnout		119,175	44.91	
Total valid votes		116,667	97.90	
Rejected ballots		2,508	2.10	
Majority		5,692	4.88	
Registered electors		265,354		
hold				

== General elections 2018 ==
Provincial election 2018: PP-37 Sialkot-III
Party	Candidate	Votes	%	±%
PML(N)	Khawaja Muhammad Mansha Ullah	50,890	45.08	
PTI	Muhammad Ashiq	46,552	41.24	
TLP	Muhammad Ansar Rafique	5,244	4.65	
MMA	Tahir Mehmood Butt	4,875	4.32	
AAT	Muhammad Anas Cheema	1,387	1.23	
Others	Others (twelve candidates)	3,930	3.48	
Turnout		115,699	51.00	
Total valid votes		112,878	97.56	
Rejected ballots		2,821	2.44	
Majority		4,338	3.84	
Registered electors		226,867		

== General elections 2013 ==
Provincial election 2013: PP-123 Sialkot-IV
Party	Candidate	Votes	%	±%
PML(N)	Khawaja Muhammad Asif	49,455	57.89	
PTI	Mian Shakeel Ahmad	32,066	37.54	
PML(Q)	Hafiz Muhammad Raza	2,173	2.54	
MWM	Gulzar Hussain	1,282	1.50	
Others	Others (five candidates)	449	0.53	
Turnout		87,079	51.78	
Total valid votes		85,425	98.10	
Rejected ballots		1,654	1.90	
Majority		17,389	20.35	
Registered electors		168,181		

== General elections 2008 ==
Provincial election 2008 : PP-123 Sialkot-IV
Party	Candidate	Votes	%	±%
PML(N)	Imran Ashraf	31,622	57.70	
PPP	Khawaja Awais Mushtaq Advocate	11,638	21.24	
PML(Q)	Mehr Arshad Mahmood	11,485	20.96	
Independent	Hafiz Muhammad Raza	35	0.06	
Independent	Mehr Muhammad Afzal	22	0.04	
Turnout		56,644	43.92	
Total valid votes		54,802	96.75	
Rejected ballots		1,842	3.25	
Majority		19,984	36.46	
Registered electors		128,985		

== See also ==
- PP-46 Sialkot-III
- PP-48 Sialkot-V
