= Rana Muhammad Afzal =

Pakistani politician

Member of the Provincial Assembly of the Punjab
- In office 15 August 2018 – 14 January 2023
- Constituency: PP-40 Sialkot-VI
- In office 29 May 2013 – 1 June 2018
- Constituency: PP-128 (Sialkot-VIII)

Personal details
- Born: 10 April 1961 (age 65) Sialkot, Punjab, Pakistan
- Party: PMLN (2013–present)

Rana Muhammad Afzal (born 10 April 1961) is a Pakistani politician who was a member of the Provincial Assembly of the Punjab from August 2018 to January 2023. Previously he was elected as a member of the Punjab Assembly from June 2013 to May 2018.

== Early life and education ==
Afzal was born on 10 April 1961 in Sialkot.

He graduated in Law in 1990 from the University of Karachi, and has a Bachelor of Arts and a Bachelor of Laws.

== Political career ==
Afzal was elected to the Provincial Assembly of the Punjab as a candidate of Pakistan Muslim League (N) (PML-N) from Constituency PP-128 (Sialkot-VIII) in the 2013 Pakistani general election.

He was re-elected to the Provincial Assembly of Punjab as a candidate of PML-N from Constituency PP-40 (Sialkot-VI) in the 2018 Pakistani general election.
