= Malik Asad Ali Khokhar =

Pakistani politician

Provincial Minister of Punjab For Housing, Urban Development & Public Health
- In office 11 August 2021 – April 2022

Provincial Minister of Punjab for Fishries and Wildlife
- In office 31 December 2019 – 19 July 2020

Member of the Provincial Assembly of the Punjab
- In office 17 July 2022 – 14 January 2023
- Constituency: PP-168 Lahore-XXV
- In office 7 January 2019 – 23 May 2022
- Constituency: PP-168 Lahore-XXV

Personal details
- Party: PML(Z) (2025-present)
- Other political affiliations: PMLN (2022-2025); PTI (2018-2022)

Malik Asad Ali Khokhar is a Pakistani politician who was a member of the Provincial Assembly of the Punjab from January 2019 till May 2022 and from July 2022 till January 2023. He also served as a Provincial Minister of Punjab For Housing, Urban Development & Public Health.

== Political career ==
Malik Asad contested his first election for the National Assembly of Pakistan on the ticket of Pakistan Tehreek-e-Insaf in the 2018 Pakistani general election. He contested in Raiwind NA136 the stronghold of PMLN. Malik Asad Ali Khokhar was not able to win the seat in general elections. However soon after the general elections he got another chance in the by-election on 13 December 2018 from constituency PP-168 of Provincial Assembly of the Punjab on the ticket of Pakistan Tehreek-e-Insaf. He won the election by the majority of 687 votes over the runner up Rana Khalid Mehmood Qadri of Pakistan Muslim League (N). He garnered 17,579 votes while Qadri received 16,892 votes.

On 27 February 2019, he was appointed the Chairman of the Chief Minister's Complaint Cell. He resigned from his post on 26 August 2019.

On 13 September 2019, he was appointed the Provincial Minister of Punjab.

On 31 December 2019, he was appointed Provincial Minister of Punjab for Fisheries and Wildlife. He resigned from his ministry on 19 July 2020.

On 6 August 2021, he was again inducted back into the Punjab Cabinet he was appointed Provincial Minister of Punjab for Housing, Urban Development & Public Health.

On 21 May 2022, he was de-seated due to his vote against party policy for the Chief Minister of Punjab election on 16 April 2022.

He was re-elected to the Provincial Assembly as a candidate of the PML(N) in the subsequent by-election. He received 26,169 votes and defeated Malik Nawaz Awan, a candidate of the PTI.
