= Malik Ahmad Khan =

Pakistani politician (born 1971)

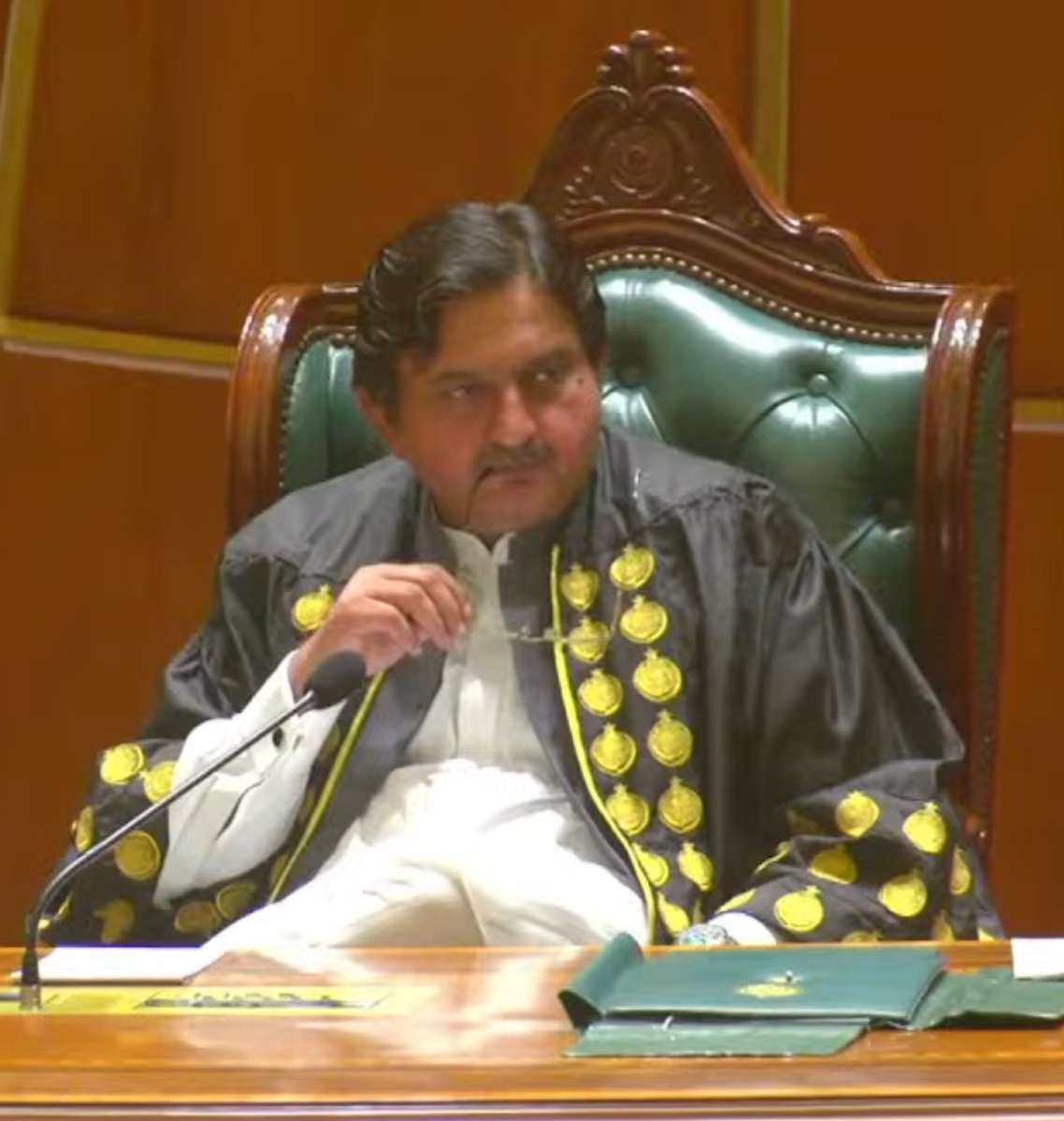
- Malik as Speaker of the Punjab Assembly

Speaker of the Provincial Assembly of Punjab
- Incumbent
- Assumed office 24 February 2024
- Deputy: Zaheer Iqbal Channar
- Preceded by: Sibtain Khan

Special Assistant to Chief Minister on Information and Culture
- In office November 2016 – May 2018

Parliamentary Secretary for Parliamentary Affairs in Provincial Assembly of the Punjab
- In office 2002–2007
- Constituency: PP-176 Kasur-III

Member of the Provincial Assembly of the Punjab
- Incumbent
- Assumed office 23 February 2024
- Constituency: PP-179 Kasur-V
- In office August 2018 – January 2023
- Constituency: PP-176 Kasur-III
- In office 29 May 2013 – 31 May 2018
- Constituency: PP-179 Kasur-V
- In office 2002–2007
- Constituency: PP-179 Kasur-V

Personal details
- Born: 29 November 1971 (age 54) Kasur, Punjab, Pakistan
- Party: PMLN (2012-present)
- Other political affiliations: PML(Q) (2002-2012)

Malik Muhammad Ahmad Khan (born 29 November 1971) is a Pakistani politician who is the current Speaker of the Provincial Assembly of Punjab, he assumed office of the Speaker on 24 February 2024. He is also a Member of the Provincial Assembly of the Punjab having taken oath on 23 February 2024. He served as an MPA from 2002 to 2007, from May 2013 to May 2018 and again from August 2018 till January 2023.

Khan is a practicing lawyer by profession, specializing in constitutional law, governance frameworks, and public policy.

== Early life and education ==
He was born on 29 November 1971 in Kasur, Punjab to Malik Muhammad Ali Khan in a Punjabi Rajput family. He's fluent in Urdu, English and Punjabi. His father was also active in electoral politics, having served as Member Punjab Assembly during 1972–77, as Senator during 1985–94, and as Deputy Chairman Senate during 1986–88.

Khan received his LL.B. (Hons.) from the University of Buckingham, United Kingdom, in 1998. Prior to that, he completed his pre-law studies at Government College, Lahore, and received his secondary and higher secondary education from Aitchison College, Lahore.

== Political career ==
=== Pakistan Muslim League (Q) ===
Khan was elected to the Provincial Assembly of the Punjab as a candidate of Pakistan Muslim League (Q) (PML-Q) from Constituency PP-179 (Kasur-V) in the 2002 Pakistani general election. He received 21,728 votes and defeated an independent candidate, Naveed Hashim Rizvi.

=== Pakistan Muslim League (N) ===
Khan announced to join Pakistan Muslim League (N) (PML-N) in January 2012.

He was re-elected to the Provincial Assembly of the Punjab as a candidate of PML-N from Constituency PP-179 (Kasur-V) in the 2013 Pakistani general election. He received 45,012 votes and defeated Sardar Muhammad Hussain Dogar, a candidate of Pakistan Tehreek Insaf(PTI).

He was re-elected to Provincial Assembly of the Punjab as a candidate of PML-N from Constituency PP-176 (Kasur-III) in the 2018 Pakistani general election.

He also remained a member of Special Committee No.3, Public Accounts Committee-II in the Provincial Assembly of Punjab.

==== Caucuses and forums established ====
Khan played a key role in aligning Punjab’s legislative agenda with the Sustainable Development Goals (SDGs) and was instrumental in forming several thematic caucuses, including those focused on women, minorities, local governments, border regions, young parliamentarians, child rights, and climate resilience. These platforms promoted inclusive and representative policymaking across gender, ethnic, geographic, and generational lines. He also championed linguistic inclusivity by enabling debates in Punjabi, Saraiki, Mewati, and Potohari to reflect Punjab’s cultural diversity. His environmental initiatives included establishing the Green and Disaster Risk Reduction Caucus, promoting green infrastructure, and advocating for a disability-friendly Assembly building to ensure accessibility.

==== Speaker Punjab Assembly ====
Khan was made Speaker of the Provincial Assembly of Punjab on 24 February 2024 after he won a provincial assembly seat in Punjab in the 2024 Punjab provincial election. He led the historic revision of the Assembly’s Rules of Procedure, enhancing executive oversight and introducing a Code of Conduct to enforce ethical standards. His reforms strengthened budgetary scrutiny and increased legislative transparency through live-streaming of sessions and digitization of records. By opening committee proceedings to expert consultations, he promoted participatory governance. His leadership secured unanimous support for parliamentary reforms, fostered bipartisan collaboration, and contributed to institutionalizing independent parliamentary governance.

== Controversies ==
=== Alleged abuse of constitutional powers (2024) ===
He faced criticism for buying cars of Rs180 million and abusing his constitutional powers by opposition leader Malik Ahmad Khan Bhachar.

=== Alleged links with terrorists (2025) ===
In May 2025, Khan participated in a rally where US-designated terrorists of the Lashkar-e-Taiba, including the son of Hafiz Saeed, were also present on the stage. Khan, who delivered a speech, was seen endorsing their views and also highlighting a personal connection with Hafiz Saeed by asserting that his father had been close to Saeed, "like brothers." This led to a controversy in the Indian media, especially in the context of the aftermath of the Pahalgam attack and the resulting India–Pakistan conflict.

== Writings ==
Khan has contributed to both academic and public discourse through various publications and writings. Notably, he authored the book Iqbal aur Masala-e-Taleem in Urdu, which delves into the educational philosophies of Allama Iqbal. This work has been published by Liberty Books in January 2021.

In addition, Khan has penned several opinion pieces and articles focusing on governance, legislative reforms, and inclusivity. His writings have been featured in publications such as The News International, where he has discussed topics like empowering women in Punjab, the importance of inclusive assemblies, and the need for rational dialogue in legislative processes.

== See also ==
- Provincial Assembly of the Punjab
- Provincial Assembly of Sindh
- Provincial Assembly of Khyber Pakhtunkhwa
- Provincial Assembly of Balochistan
