= Mian Muhammad Akhtar Hayat =

Pakistani politician

Member of the Provincial Assembly of the Punjab
- In office 15 August 2018 – 14 January 2023
- Constituency: PP-32 Gujrat-V

Personal details
- Relations: Mian Muhammad Afzal Hayat (brother)

Mian Muhammad Akhtar Hayat is a Pakistani politician who had been a member of the Provincial Assembly of the Punjab from August 2018 till January 2023. Mian Akhter Hayat is a retired police officer of Pakistan and he has also served as an assistant collector in Punjab.

== Early life and education ==
He was born on 1 October 1950 in Kharian Tehsil, Pakistan.

He has a degree of Bachelor of Arts.

== Political career ==
He was elected to the Provincial Assembly of the Punjab as a candidate of the Pakistan Tehreek-e-Insaf (PTI) from PP-32 (Gujrat-V) in the 2018 Pakistani general election.

He ran for a seat in the Provincial Assembly from PP-30 Gujrat-III as a candidate of the PTI in the 2023 Punjab provincial election.
