= Zakia Shahnawaz Khan =

Pakistani politician

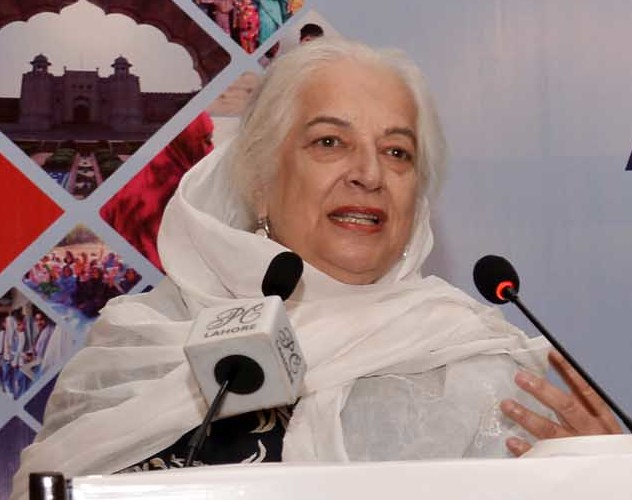

Provincial Minister of Punjab for Environment
- In office November 2016 – May 2018

Provincial Minister of Punjab for Population Welfare
- In office June 2013 – November 2016

Member of the Provincial Assembly of the Punjab
- In office 15 August 2018 – 14 January 2023
- Constituency: Reserved seat for women
- In office 29 May 2013 – May 2018
- Constituency: Reserved seat for women
- In office 22 March 1985 – 29 May 1988
- Constituency: Reserved seat for women
- In office 27 March 1977 – 5 July 1977
- Constituency: Reserved seat for women

Personal details
- Born: 5 March 1946 (age 80) Isakhel, Punjab, British India
- Party: PMLN (2013-present)

Zakia Shahnawaz Khan (Urdu: زکیہ شاہ نواز خان; born 5 March 1946) is a Pakistani politician who was a member of the Provincial Assembly of the Punjab between 1977 and May 2018.

== Early life and education ==
Khan was born on 5 March 1946 in Isakhel.

She received her education from St Denys High School, Murree and Queen Mary College, Lahore and completed matriculation level education.

== Political career ==
Khan was elected to the Provincial Assembly of the Punjab on a reserved seat for women in the 1977 Pakistani general election.

She was re-elected to the Provincial Assembly of the Punjab on a reserved seat for women in the 1985 Pakistani general election.

She was re-elected to the Provincial Assembly of the Punjab as a candidate of Pakistan Muslim League (N) (PML-N) on a reserved seat for women in the 2013 Pakistani general election. In June 2013, she was inducted into the provincial Punjab cabinet of Chief Minister Shehbaz Sharif and was made Provincial Minister of Punjab for Population Welfare. In November 2016, she was made Provincial Minister of Punjab for environment protection.

She was re-elected to the Provincial Assembly of the Punjab as a candidate of PML-N on a reserved seat for women in the 2018 Pakistani general election.
