= Saleem Sarwar Jaura =

Pakistani politician

Member of the Provincial Assembly of the Punjab
- In office 15 August 2018 – 14 January 2023
- Constituency: PP-31 Gujrat-IV

Personal details
- Party: PTI (2018-present)

Saleem Sarwar Jaura is a Pakistani politician who had been a member of the Provincial Assembly of the Punjab from August 2018 till January 2023. He is the son of former MPA, Muhammad Sarwar Jaura.

== Political career ==
He was elected to the Provincial Assembly of the Punjab as a candidate of the Pakistan Tehreek-e-Insaf (PTI) from PP-31 (Gujrat-IV) in the 2018 Punjab provincial election. He contested the election as a joint candidate of the PTI and Pakistan Muslim League (Q). He serves as a syndicate member at the University of Gujrat. He also held the position of Parliamentary Secretary for Social Welfare

He ran for a seat in the Provincial Assembly from PP-33 Gujrat-VI as a candidate of the PTI in the 2023 Punjab provincial election.
