= PP-176 Kasur-III =

Constituency of the Provincial Assembly of Punjab, Pakistan

- Constituency for the Provincial Assembly of Punjab
- Region: Kasur city of Kasur District

Current constituency
- Created from: PP-177 Kasur-III

PP-176 Kasur-III (پی پی-176، قصور-3) is a Constituency of Provincial Assembly of Punjab.

== General elections 2018 ==
Contesting candidates	Party affiliation	Votes polled

== General elections 2013 ==
Contesting candidates	Party affiliation	Votes polled

== General elections 2008 ==
Contesting candidates	Party affiliation	Votes polled

== See also ==
- PP-175 Kasur-II
- PP-177 Kasur-IV
