= Qasim Abbas Khan =

Pakistani politician

Member of the Provincial Assembly of Punjab
- In office 22 October 2018 – 14 January 2023
- Constituency: PP-222 Multan-XII

Personal details
- Party: PTI (2025-present)
- Other political affiliations: IND (2018-2025)

Qasim Abbas Khan is a Pakistani politician who had been a member of the Provincial Assembly of Punjab from October 2018 till January 2023.

== Political career ==
Khan was elected to the Provincial Assembly of Punjab from the constituency PP-222 in the 2018 Pakistani by-elections as an independent candidate. He defeated Sohail Ahmed Noon of Pakistan Tehreek-e-Insaf. Khan garnered 38,327 votes while his closest rival secured 31,893 votes.
