= PP-181 Kasur-VII =

Constituency of the Provincial Assembly of Punjab, Pakistan

- Constituency for the Provincial Assembly of Punjab
- Region: Chunian Tehsil (partly) including Chunian and Khudian towns of Kasur District

Current constituency
- Created from: PP-181 Kasur-VII (2002-2018); PP-178 Kasur-V (2018-2023)

PP-181 Kasur-VII (پی پی-181، قصور-7) is a Constituency of Provincial Assembly of Punjab.

== General elections 2024 ==
Provincial election 2024: PP-181 Kasur-VII
Party	Candidate	Votes	%	±%
Independent	Humble Sanaa Kareem (Note: Filed nomination papers as PTI candidate but ECP allowed him to run as an Independent)	49,505	41.50	
PML(N)	Sheikh Alla Uddin	35,929	30.12	
Independent	Zahid Qayyum Khan	14,954	12.54	
TLP	Muhammad Farooq	11,365	9.53	
PPP	Syed Muhammad Ammar Kazmi	2,489	2.09	
Others	Others (thirteen candidates)	5,054	4.22	
Turnout		123,491	55.84	
Total valid votes		119,296	96.60	
Rejected ballots		4,195	3.40	
Majority		13,576	11.38	
Registered electors		221,134		
hold				

== General elections 2018 ==
Provincial election 2018: PP-781 Kasur-V
Party	Candidate	Votes	%	±%
PML(N)	Sheikh Allauddin	37,404	30.67	
Independent	Humble Sanaa Kareemi	28,727	23.55	
PTI	Zahid Qayyum Khan	27,866	22.85	
TLP	Syed Haider Abbas Sherazi	13,683	11.22	
PPP	Muhammad Irshad Khan	4,852	3.98	
AAT	Mohsin Ali Jahangir	4,254	3.49	
Independent	Chaudhary Munir Ahmad	1,820	1.49	
Independent	Akhtar Hussain	1,098	0.90	
Others	Others (eight candidates)	2,261	1.87	
Turnout		125,802	60.51	
Total valid votes		121,965	96.95	
Rejected ballots		3,837	3.05	
Majority		8,677	7.12	
Registered electors		207,905		

== General elections 2013 ==
Provincial election 2013: PP-181 Kasur-VII
Party	Candidate	Votes	%	±%
PML(N)	Sheikh Alaudin	47,067	55.54	
PML(Q)	Zahid Qayyum Khan	17,504	20.65	
PTI	Rana Aqeel Aslam	11,230	13.25	
PPP	Kanwar Mumtaz Hussain	6,635	7.83	
Others	Others (eleven candidates)	2,310	2.73	
Turnout		91,714	62.75	
Total valid votes		84,746	92.40	
Rejected ballots		6,968	7.60	
Majority		29,563	34.89	
Registered electors		146,150		

== General elections 2008 ==
Contesting candidates	Party affiliation	Votes polled

== See also ==
- PP-180 Kasur-VI
- PP-182 Kasur-VIII
