= Sania Ashiq =

Pakistani politician

Member of the Provincial Assembly of the Punjab
- Incumbent
- Assumed office 15 August 2018
- Constituency: Reserved seat for women

Personal details
- Born: March 1993 Age-28 Lahore, Punjab, Pakistan
- Party: Pakistan Muslim League (N)

Sania Ashiq Jabeen is a Pakistani politician who has been a member of the Provincial Assembly of the Punjab since August 2018.

== Early life and education ==
She was born and raised in Lahore, Pakistan.

She has received a degree of Pharmacy-D (Doctor of Pharmacy) from the University of Punjab.

== Political career ==
She was elected to the Provincial Assembly of the Punjab as a candidate of Pakistan Muslim League (N) (PML-N) on a reserved seat for women in 2018 Pakistani general election. At the age of 25, she became the youngest member of the Punjab Assembly to be elected in 2018 general election.

== Special Assistant to Chief Minister for Special Education ==
Ashiq was appointed Special Assistant to the Chief Minister of Punjab for the Special Education Department on 25 October 2024, a non-remuneration position under the Punjab Special Assistants (Salary, Allowances & Privileges) Ordinance, 2002.

During her tenure, the Punjab government approved several initiatives for the special-education sector which Ashiq presented to the Chief Minister in a briefing, including a facial-recognition attendance system for students — described as the first such system in the province's special-education sector — and a province-wide enrollment and awareness campaign to encourage the admission of out-of-school special children. As part of this campaign, she took part in enrollment drives, including one held in Pattoki.

Ashiq was also assigned to monitor the establishment of the Maryam Nawaz School and Resource Centre for Autism in Lahore, described as Pakistan's first government-run school and resource centre dedicated to children with autism spectrum disorder. She chaired the centre's first Board of Directors meeting in November 2025, where the board approved free uniforms, meals, therapy, books and transport for enrolled children, and decided to establish an Autism Teacher Training and Research Resource Centre at the same site. The centre held its inaugural ceremony in February 2026, addressed by Chief Minister Maryam Nawaz, who announced that autism-care facilities would be extended to the district level. On World Autism Day 2026, Maryam Nawaz publicly credited Ashiq and her team for their role in establishing the centre.

Separately, autism units were established in special-education institutions across the province: ten such units existed as of February 2025, rising to 27 divisional public schools with autism centres by April 2026.

She has also carried out administrative activities in her role, including distributing tablets to District Education Officers of special education in Dera Ghazi Khan, Faisalabad and Sahiwal in December 2024, and distributing appointment letters to newly recruited staff at the Maryam Nawaz School and Resource Centre for Autism in March 2026.
