= Saeed Ahmad Saeedi =

Pakistani politician

Member of the Provincial Assembly of the Punjab
- In office 15 August 2018 – 14 January 2023
- Constituency: PP-121 Toba Tek Singh-IV

Personal details
- Party: PTI (2018-present)

Saeed Ahmad Saeedi (چوہدری سعید احمد سعیدی) is a Pakistani politician who had been a member of the Provincial Assembly of the Punjab from August 2018 till January 2023. He was born in Toba Tek Singh, Punjab, Pakistan. He is the son of Chaudhry Shafi Ahmed and he belongs to Arain family.

== Political career ==
Saeedi started his political career in the 2008 Punjab provincial election as a Pakistan Muslim League (Q) (PML(Q)) candidate from PP-90 Toba Tek Singh-VII, but lost to Mian Muhammad Rafique, a candidate of the Pakistan Muslim League (N) (PML(N)). He received 33,973 votes against Rafique's 39,537 votes.

In 2012, Saeedi quit the PML(Q) and joined the Pakistan Tehreek-e-Insaf (PTI). He contested the 2013 Punjab provincial election as a candidate of the PTI from PP-90 Toba Tek Singh-VII, but again lost to Mian Muhammad Rafique, the PML(N) candidate. He received 42,719 votes against Rafique's 46,769 votes.

He contested the 2018 Punjab provincial election as a candidate of the PTI from PP-121 Toba Tek Singh-IV and defeated Chaudhry Amjad Ali Javaid, a candidate of the PML(N). He received 61,716 votes against Javaid's 56,345 votes.

He became the Parliamentary Secretary of Excise and Taxation in Chief Minister Usman Buzdar's cabinet till 3 April 2022.

He ran for a seat in the Provincial Assembly from PP-120 Toba Tek Singh-III as a candidate of the PTI in the 2024 Punjab provincial election.
