= PP-51 Sialkot-VIII =

Constituency of the Punjabi Provincial Legislature, Pakistan

- Constituency for the Provincial Assembly of Punjab
- Region: Daska Tehsil (partly) including Daska city of Sialkot District

Current constituency
- Created from: PP-130 Sialkot-XI (2002–2018); PP-42 Sialkot-VIII (2018-2023)

PP-51 Sialkot-VIII (پی پی-51، سيالكوٹ-8) is a Constituency of Provincial Assembly of Punjab.

== General elections 2024 ==
Provincial election 2024: PP-51 Sialkot-VIII
Party	Candidate	Votes	%	±%
PML(N)	Zeeshan Rafique	49,286	39.05	
Independent	Waqas Iftikhar (Note: Filed nomination papers as PTI candidate but ECP allowed him to run as an Independent)	46,647	36.96	
Independent	Muhammad Afzal	13,089	10.37	
TLP	Usman Ashraf	9,535	7.56	
Others	Others (twenty six candidates)	7,658	6.06	
Turnout		128,620	46.29	
Total valid votes		126,215	98.13	
Rejected ballots		2,405	1.87	
Majority		2,639	2.09	
Registered electors		277,860		
hold				

== General elections 2018 ==
Provincial election 2018: PP-42 Sialkot-VIII
Party	Candidate	Votes	%	±%
PML(N)	Zeeshan Rafique	52,630	46.75	
PTI	Chaudhry Sadaqat Ali	30,185	26.81	
Independent	Zia Hayee	17,991	15.98	
TLP	Muhammad Shahid	6,024	5.35	
PPP	Hassan Parvez	1,721	1.53	
AAT	Mirza Shahid Siddique	1,586	1.44	
Others	Others (six candidates)	2,443	2.17	
Turnout		115,937	55.02	
Total valid votes		112,580	97.11	
Rejected ballots		3,357	2.89	
Majority		22,445	19.94	
Registered electors		210,734		

== General elections 2013 ==
Provincial election 2013: PP-130 Sialkot-X
Party	Candidate	Votes	%	±%
PML(N)	Muhammad Asif Bajwa	56,740	58.87	
PTI	Nasir Mehmood Cheema	24,481	25.40	
PML(Q)	Chaudhary Zia Ullah Khara	6,031	6.26	
PPP	Qari Zulfiqar Ali Sialvi	3,780	3.92	
Independent	Mirza Shahid Siddique	1,685	1.75	
Others	Others (thirteen candidates)	3,663	3.80	
Turnout		98,970	56.48	
Total valid votes		96,380	97.38	
Rejected ballots		2,590	2.62	
Majority		32,259	33.47	
Registered electors		175,239		

== General elections 2008 ==
Provincial election 2008: PP-130 Sialkot-X
Party	Candidate	Votes	%	±%
PML(N)	Yahya Gul Nawaz	41,803	58.50	
PPP	Qari Zulifqar Ali Sialvi	15,116	21.15	
PML(Q)	Ch. Mumtaz Ali	14,242	19.93	
Others	Others	294	0.41	
Turnout		73,443	52.21	
Total valid votes		71,455	97.29	
Rejected ballots		1,988	2.71	
Majority		26,687	37.35	
Registered electors		140,679		

== See also ==
- PP-50 Sialkot-VII
- PP-52 Sialkot-IX
