= Muhammad Akhtar Malik =

Pakistani politician

Member of the Provincial Assembly of the Punjab
- In office 15 August 2018 – 14 January 2023
- Constituency: PP-219 Multan-IX

Personal details
- Party: JIP (2026-present)
- Other political affiliations: PTI (2018-2026)

Muhammad Akhtar Malik is a Pakistani politician who had been a member of the Provincial Assembly of the Punjab from August 2018 till January 2023.

== Early life and education ==
Born on 12 May 1966 in Multan in a prominent Arain family, Punjab, he obtained his MBBS in 1992 from the Baha-ud-Din-Zakariya University.

== Political career ==
He was elected to the Provincial Assembly of the Punjab as a candidate of the Pakistan Tehreek-e-Insaf (PTI) from PP-219 (Multan-IX) in the 2018 Punjab provincial election.

On 12 September 2018, he was inducted into the provincial cabinet of Chief Minister Usman Buzdar as minister for energy department.

He ran for a seat in the Provincial Assembly from PP-219 Multan-IX as a candidate of the PTI in the 2023 Punjab provincial election.
