= Malik Mukhtar Ahmad =

Pakistani politician

Member of the Provincial Assembly of the Punjab
- In office 15 August 2018 – 14 January 2023
- Constituency: PP-179 Kasur-VI

Personal details
- Party: TLP (2025–present)
- Other political affiliations: IPP (2023–2025); PTI (2018–2023)

Malik Mukhtar Ahmad is a Pakistani politician who had been a member of the Provincial Assembly of the Punjab from August 2018 till January 2023.

== Political career ==
He was elected to the Provincial Assembly of the Punjab as a candidate of the Pakistan Tehreek-e-Insaf (PTI) from PP-179 (Kasur-VI) in the 2018 Punjab provincial election.

He ran for a seat in the Provincial Assembly from PP-181 Kasur-VIII as a candidate of the PTI in the 2023 Punjab provincial election.
