= Uzma Kardar =

Pakistani politician

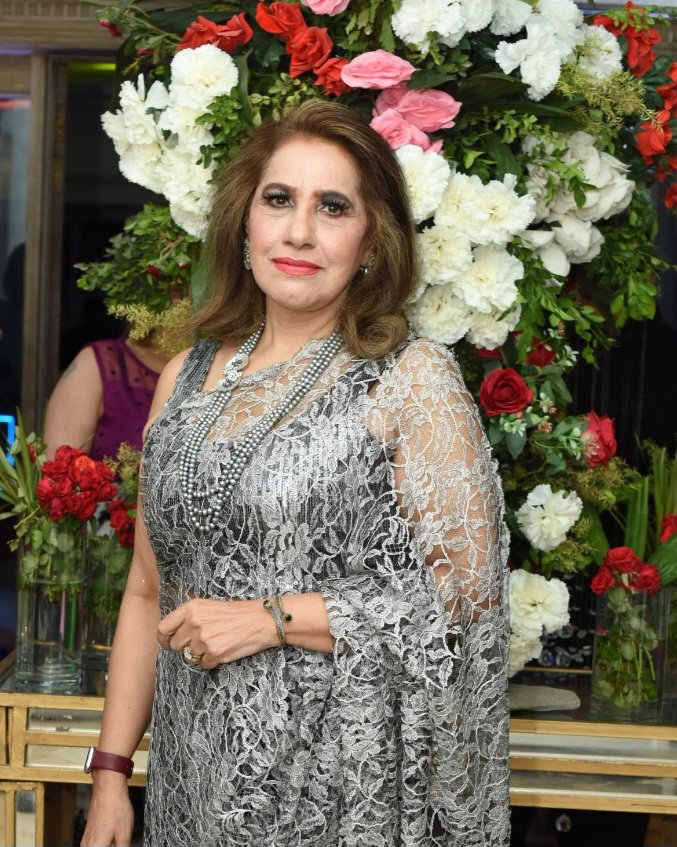
- Uzma Kardar, Pakistani politician and former member of the Provincial Assembly of Punjab.

Member of the Provincial Assembly of the Punjab
- Incumbent
- Assumed office 27 February 2024
- Constituency: Reserved seat for women
- In office 15 August 2018 – 21 May 2022
- Constituency: Reserved seat for women

Personal details
- Born: 8 April 1956 (age 70) Lahore, Punjab, Pakistan
- Party: PMLN (2023-present)
- Other political affiliations: PTI (2018-2022)

Uzma Kardar (Urdu: عظمیٰ کاردار; born 8 April 1956) is a Pakistani politician who has been a Member of the Provincial Assembly of the Punjab since 2024.

== Early life and education ==
Kardar was born on 8 April 1956 in Lahore, Pakistan.

She did graduation from Kinnaird College for Women in 1980 and has a degree of Bachelor of Arts.

== Political career ==
Kardar was elected to the Provincial Assembly of the Punjab as a candidate of Pakistan Tehreek-e-Insaf (PTI) on a reserved seat for women in the 2018 Pakistani general election.

In July 2020, she was expelled from PTI for violation of party discipline and was ordered to resign from the Punjab Assembly. In May 2022, she was de-notified by the ECP as a member of the assembly due to her vote in favor of Pakistan Muslim League (N) (PML-N) candidate, Hamza Shahbaz, in the chief minister election held on 16 April 2022.

In the 2024 Pakistani general election, she secured a seat in the Provincial Assembly of the Punjab through a reserved quota for women as a candidate of PML-N.
