= Chaudhry Naveed Ashraf =

Pakistani politician

Member of the Provincial Assembly of the Punjab
- In office 15 August 2018 – 14 January 2023
- Constituency: PP-43 Sialkot-IX
- Incumbent
- Assumed office 24 February 2024

Personal details
- Party: PMLN (2018-present)

Chaudhry Naveed Ashraf (born 1949) is a Pakistani politician who had been a Member of the Provincial Assembly of the Punjab from August 2018 till January 2023.
