= Makhdoom Fawaz Ahmed Hashmi =

Pakistani politician

Member of the Provincial Assembly of Punjab
- In office 22 October 2018 – 14 January 2023
- Constituency: PP-261 Rahim Yar Khan-VII

Personal details
- Party: PTI (2018-present)

Makhdoom Fawaz Ahmed Hashmi is a Pakistani politician who had been a member of the Provincial Assembly of Punjab from October 2018 till January 2023.

== Political career ==
Hashmi was elected to the Provincial Assembly of Punjab from the constituency PP-261 in the 2018 Pakistani by-elections as a candidate of Pakistan Tehreek-e-Insaf. He defeated Makhdoom Hassan Raza Hashim of Pakistan Peoples Party. Hashmi garnered 29,526 votes while his closest rival secured 14,995 votes.
