= PP-169 Lahore-XXV =

Constituency of the Provincial Assembly of Punjab, Pakistan

- Constituency for the Provincial Assembly of Punjab
- Region: Lahore City in Lahore District

Current constituency
- Created from: PP-148 Lahore-XII (2002-2018); PP-168 Lahore-XXV (2018-2023)

PP-169 Lahore-XXV (پی پی-169، لاہور-25) is a Constituency of Provincial Assembly of Punjab.

== General elections 2024 ==
Provincial election 2024: PP-169 Lahore-XXV
Party	Candidate	Votes	%	±%
PML(N)	Malik Khalid Pervaz Khokhar	85,030	51.41	
Independent	Mian Mahmood-Ur-Rashid (Note: Filed nomination papers as PTI candidate but E allowed him to run as an Independent)	62,718	37.92	
TLP	Ch. Kabir Ahmad	6,177	3.73	
JI	Ahmad Salman	3,404	2.06	
Independent	Mian Muhammad Amjad Iqbal	2,909	1.76	
Others	Others (twenty eight candidates)	5,171	3.12	
Turnout		166,951	58.38	
Total valid votes		165,409	99.08	
Rejected ballots		1,542	0.92	
Majority		22,312	13.49	
Registered electors		285,991		
hold				

== General elections 2018 ==
Provincial election 2018: PP-168 Lahore-XXV
Party	Candidate	Votes	%	±%
PML(N)	Khawaja Saad Rafique	34,119	54.37	
PTI	Muhammad Fiaz Bhatti	14,950	23.82	
TLP	Sajid Mehmood	9,411	15.00	
PPP	Muhammad Maqbool	2,424	3.86	
AAT	Muhammad Ishtiaq Ahmad	820	1.31	
Others	Others (ten candidates)	1,033	1.64	
Turnout		63,842	50.32	
Total valid votes		62,757	98.30	
Rejected ballots		1,085	1.70	
Majority		19,169	30.55	
Registered electors		126,862		

== General elections 2013 ==
Provincial election 2013: PP-148 Lahore-XII
Party	Candidate	Votes	%	±%
PTI	Mian Muhammad Aslam Iqbal	54,939	50.58	
PML(N)	Akhtar Rasool Chaudary	49,807	45.86	
PPP	Muhammad Naeem Zafar	1,039	0.96	
JI	Muhammad Riaz Ul Hassan	1,006	0.93	
Others	Others (fourteen candidates)	1,817	1.67	
Turnout		109,873	56.34	
Total valid votes		108,608	98.85	
Rejected ballots		1,265	1.15	
Majority		5,132	4.72	
Registered electors		195,026		

== General elections 2008 ==
Contesting candidates	Party affiliation	Votes polled

== See also ==
- PP-168 Lahore-XXIV
- PP-170 Lahore-XXVI
