= PP-49 Sialkot-VI =

Constituency of the Punjabi Provincial Legislature, Pakistan

- Constituency for the Provincial Assembly of Punjab
- Region: Pasrur Tehsil (partly) including Pasrur city of Sialkot District

Current constituency
- Created from: PP-128 Sialkot-IX (2002–2018); PP-41 Sialkot-VII (2018-2023)

PP-49 Sialkot-VI (پی پی-49، سيالكوٹ-6) is a Constituency of Provincial Assembly of Punjab.

== General elections 2024 ==
Provincial election 2024: PP-49 Sialkot-VI
Party	Candidate	Votes	%	±%
Independent	Muhammad Fiaz	46,776	34.23	
PML(N)	Rana Muhammad Afzal	40,330	29.51	
Independent	Munawar Ahmed Gill (Note: Filed nomination papers as PTI candidate but ECP allowed him to run as an Independent)	26,428	19.34	
TLP	Muhammad Usama Rana	12,272	8.98	
Independent	Ghazanfar Sohail	3,531	2.58	
Others	Others (twenty nine candidates)	10,894	5.36	
Turnout		144,621	49.38	
Total valid votes		140,231	96.96	
Rejected ballots		4,390	3.04	
Majority		6,446	4.72	
Registered electors		293,123		
hold				

== General elections 2018 ==
Provincial election 2018: PP-41 Sialkot-VII
Party	Candidate	Votes	%	±%
PML(Q)	Muhammad Rizwan	32,833	28.74	
PML(N)	Syed Atta Ul Hassan	26,902	23.55	
Independent	Muhammad Hafeez	15,740	13.78	
Independent	Abdul Waheed Meo	15,524	13.59	
Independent	Aman Ullah	14,524	12.74	
TLP	Muhammad Arif	3,175	2.78	
Independent	Shaukat Ali	1,687	1.48	
Others	Others (sixteen candidates)	3,854	3.37	
Turnout		118,965	56.31	
Total valid votes		114,239	96.03	
Rejected ballots		4,726	3.97	
Majority		5,931	5.19	
Registered electors		211,281		

== General elections 2013 ==
Provincial election 2013: PP-128 Sialkot-IX
Party	Candidate	Votes	%	±%
PML(N)	Rana Muhammad Afzal	36,529	50.40	
PML(Q)	Bao Muhammad Rizwan	21,129	29.15	
Independent	Syed Wajid Ali Gillani	8,503	11.73	
PTI	Muhammad Nawaz	3,517	4.85	
Independent	Muhammad Ameen Bajwa	2,024	2.79	
Others	Others (ten candidates)	780	1.08	
Turnout		75,156	57.75	
Total valid votes		72,482	96.44	
Rejected ballots		2,674	3.56	
Majority		15,400	21.25	
Registered electors		130,148		

== General elections 2008 ==
Provincial election 2008: PP-128 Sialkot-IX
Party	Candidate	Votes	%	±%
PML(Q)	Muhammad Rizwan	21,370	35.71	
PML(N)	Rana Muhammad Afzal	18,072	30.20	
PPP	Ch. Muhammad Ayyub Mayo Advocate	10,127	16.92	
Independent	Shahid Mehmood Butt	8,807	14.72	
Independent	Rauf Ahmed Bajwa	1,103	1.84	
Others	Others	362	0.60	
Turnout		62,232	58.31	
Total valid votes		59,841	96.16	
Rejected ballots		2,391	3.84	
Majority		3,298	5.51	
Registered electors		106,719		

== See also ==
- PP-48 Sialkot-V
- PP-50 Sialkot-VII
