= PP-180 Kasur-VI =

Constituency of the Provincial Assembly of Punjab, Pakistan

- Constituency for the Provincial Assembly of Punjab
- Region: Chunian Tehsil (partly) including Talwandi, Allahabad and Kanganpur towns of Kasur District

Current constituency
- Created from: PP-180 Kasur-VI (2002-2018); PP-177 Kasur-IV (2018-2023)

PP-180 Kasur-VI (پی پی-180، قصور-6) is a Constituency of Provincial Assembly of Punjab.

== General elections 2024 ==
Provincial election 2024: PP-180 Kasur-VI
Party	Candidate	Votes	%	±%
Independent	Ahsan Raza Khan	34,756	28.96	
Independent	Waqas Hassan Mokal	21,787	18.15	
IPP	Muhammad Hashim Dogar	21,421	17.85	
PMML	Saif Ullah	15,400	12.83	
Independent	Daud Aslam	7,297	6.08	
Independent	Javaid Iqbal	6,058	5.05	
PPP	Mirza Jahanazaib Baig	4,690	3.91	
TLP	Mansoor Ahmad	2,991	2.49	
Independent	Mazhar Rasheed Khan	2,176	1.81	
Others	Others (seventeen candidates)	3,447	2.87	
Turnout		126,335	58.95	
Total valid votes		120,023	95.00	
Rejected ballots		6,312	5.00	
Majority		12,969	10.81	
Registered electors		214,314		
hold				

== General elections 2018 ==
Provincial election 2018: PP-177 Kasur-IV
Party	Candidate	Votes	%	±%
PTI	Muhammad Hashim Dogar	41,606	32.82	
PML(N)	Ahsan Raza Khan	39,936	31.51	
Independent	Waqas Hassan Mokal	13,648	10.77	
Independent	Zafar Iqbal	12,992	10.25	
PPP	Zaheer Ahmad	5,250	4.14	
AAT	Mian Muhammad Azam	5,226	4.12	
TLP	Rizwan Yousaf	3,719	2.93	
Independent	Muhammad Javaid Iqbal	1,509	1.19	
Others	Others (seven candidates)	2,874	2.27	
Turnout		131,036	60.03	
Total valid votes		126,760	96.74	
Rejected ballots		4,276	3.26	
Majority		1,670	1.31	
Registered electors		218,296		

== General elections 2013 ==
Provincial election 2013: PP-180 Kasur-VI
Party	Candidate	Votes	%	±%
PML(Q)	Waqas Hassan Mokal	31,840	34.94	
PML(N)	Ahsan Raza Khan	26,766	29.37	
PTI	Muhammad Javaid Iqbal	17,102	18.77	
Independent	Sardar Muhammad Amjad	9,717	10.66	
Independent	Noor Samand	2,961	3.25	
Others	Others (sixteen candidates)	2,742	3.01	
Turnout		94,415	64.84	
Total valid votes		91,128	96.52	
Rejected ballots		3,287	3.48	
Majority		5,074	5.57	
Registered electors		145,605		

== General elections 2008 ==
Contesting candidates	Party affiliation	Votes polled

== See also ==
- PP-179 Kasur-V
- PP-181 Kasur-VII
