= PP-48 Sialkot-V =

Constituency of the Provincial Assembly of Punjab, Pakistan

- Constituency for the Provincial Assembly of Punjab
- Region: Pasrur Tehsil (partly) including Chawinda town of Sialkot District

Current constituency
- Created from: PP-127 Sialkot-VIII (2002–2018); PP-40 Sialkot-VI and PP-39 Sialkot-V (partly) (2018-2023)

PP-48 Sialkot-V (پی پی-48، سيالكوٹ-5) is a Constituency of Provincial Assembly of Punjab.

== General elections 2024 ==
Provincial election 2024: PP-48 Sialkot-V
Party	Candidate	Votes	%	±%
Independent	Khurram Khan Virk	46,625	31.39	
PML(N)	Liaqat Ali	41,312	27.82	
Independent	Ahsan Abbas (Note: Filed nomination papers as PTI candidate but ECP allowed him to run as an Independent)	38,275	25.77	
TLP	Muhammad Sajid	14,090	9.49	
Independent	Shahid Iqbal	3,875	2.61	
Others	Others (twenty six candidates)	5,835	2.92	
Turnout		155,241	52.46	
Total valid votes		150,012	96.63	
Rejected ballots		5,229	3.37	
Majority		5,313	3.57	
Registered electors		295,897		
hold				

== General elections 2018 ==
Provincial election 2018: PP-40 Sialkot-VI
Party	Candidate	Votes	%	±%
PML(N)	Rana Muhammad Afzal	52,577	44.12	
PTI	Chaudhary Amjad Ali Bajwa	36,209	30.38	
Independent	Munawar Ahmad Gill	17,129	14.37	
TLP	Ghulam Mustafa	9,332	7.83	
Independent	Chaudhary Muhammad Yasin	1,186	1.00	
Others	Others (eight candidates)	2,747	2.30	
Turnout		122,310	55.77	
Total valid votes		119,180	97.44	
Rejected ballots		3,130	2.56	
Majority		16,368	13.74	
Registered electors		219,295		

== General elections 2013 ==
Provincial election 2013: PP-127 Sialkot-VII
Party	Candidate	Votes	%	±%
PML(N)	Munawar Ahmed Gill	51,125	53.66	
PTI	Chaudhary Amjad Ali Bajwa	20,962	22.00	
Independent	Ch. Muhammad Iqbal Khokhar	8,439	8.86	
PPP	Maqbool Ahmed	3,549	3.73	
Independent	Rana Ejaz Ahmed	2,905	3.05	
PML(Q)	Syed Bilal Mustafa Sherazi	1,979	2.08	
JI	Ejaz Ahmed Nagra	1,644	1.73	
Independent	Ch. Maseetay Khan	1,267	1.33	
Others	Others (eighteen candidates)	3,400	3.57	
Turnout		98,174	56.04	
Total valid votes		95,270	97.04	
Rejected ballots		2,904	2.96	
Majority		30,163	31.66	
Registered electors		175,187		

== General elections 2008 ==
Provincial election 2008: PP-127 Sialkot-VII
Party	Candidate	Votes	%	±%
PML(N)	Munawar Ahmed Gill	34,318	45.03	
PML(Q)	Armghan Subhani	26,412	34.65	
PPP	Naseem Akhtar Rana	15,242	20.00	
Others	Others	243	0.32	
Turnout		78,950	56.10	
Total valid votes		76,215	96.54	
Rejected ballots		2,735	3.46	
Majority		7,906	10.38	
Registered electors		140,734		

== See also ==
- PP-47 Sialkot-IV
- PP-49 Sialkot-VI
