= Muhammad Abdullah Warraich =

Pakistani politician

Leader of the Opposition, in Provincial Assembly of Punjab
- Incumbent
- Assumed office 28 July 2025
- Leader of the House: Maryam Nawaz

Member of the Provincial Assembly of the Punjab
- Incumbent
- Assumed office 23 February 2024
- Constituency: Gujrat
- In office 15 August 2018 – 14 January 2023
- Constituency: PP-29 Gujrat-II
- In office 9 April 2008 – 20 March 2013
- Constituency: PP-109 (Gujrat-II)
- In office 25 November 2002 – 17 November 2007
- Constituency: PP-109 (Gujrat-II)

Personal details
- Party: PTI (2023-present)
- Other political affiliations: PML(Q) (2018-2023)

Muhammad Abdullah Warraich is a Pakistani politician who had been a member of the Provincial Assembly of the Punjab from August 2018 till January 2023 and again from 2024 to present.

He was newly-elected Leader of the Opposition in Punjab Assembly, in 2002 also served as Member of the House till 2013.

== Political career ==
He was elected to the Provincial Assembly of the Punjab as a candidate of Pakistan Muslim League (Q) from Constituency PP-29 (Gujrat-II) in the 2018 Pakistani general election.

On 21 February 2023, after the dissolution of the Provincial Assembly, Warraich, along with former Chief Minister Chaudhry Pervaiz Elahi and eight other former PML(Q) MPAs, joined the Pakistan Tehreek-e-Insaf (PTI).
