= PP-50 Sialkot-VII =

Constituency of the Provincial Assembly of Punjab, Pakistan

- Constituency for the Provincial Assembly of Punjab
- Region: Daska Tehsil (partly) of Sialkot District

Current constituency
- Created from: PP-129 Sialkot-X (2002–2018); PP-43 Sialkot-IX (2018-2023)

PP-50 Sialkot-VII (پی پی-50، سيالكوٹ-7) is a Constituency of Provincial Assembly of Punjab.

== General elections 2024 ==
Provincial election 2024: PP-50 Sialkot-VII
Party	Candidate	Votes	%	±%
PML(N)	Chaudhry Naveed Ashraf	45,635	35.72	
Independent	Aman Ullah (Note: Filed nomination papers as PTI candidate but ECP allowed him to run as an Independent)	44,037	34.47	
TLP	Muhammad Shahbaz	12,254	9.59	
Independent	Muhammad Hafeez	11,207	8.77	
Independent	Waqas Iftikhar	5,055	3.96	
Independent	Toheed Khalid	3,437	2.69	
Others	Others (twenty six candidates)	6,136	4.80	
Turnout		131,596	51.22	
Total valid votes		127,761	97.09	
Rejected ballots		3,835	2.91	
Majority		1,598	1.25	
Registered electors		256,938		
hold				

== General elections 2018 ==
Provincial election 2018: PP-43 Sialkot-IX
Party	Candidate	Votes	%	±%
PML(N)	Chaudhry Naveed Ashraf	55,555	47.00	
PTI	Nasir Mehmood Cheema	37,287	31.55	
TLP	Yasir Hussain	8,683	7.35	
Independent	Chaudhry Ansir Iqbal Baryar	8,637	7.31	
Independent	Omer Shehzad Ghumman	4,493	3.80	
AAT	Sajjad Akbar	1,449	1.23	
Others	Others (four candidates)	2,093	1.77	
Turnout		121,420	58.10	
Total valid votes		118,197	97.35	
Rejected ballots		3,223	2.65	
Majority		18,268	15.45	
Registered electors		208,989		

== General elections 2013 ==
Provincial election 2013 : PP-129 Sialkot-IX
Party	Candidate	Votes	%	±%
PML(N)	Ch. Mohsin Ashraf	63,257	70.74	
PTI	Fiaz Iqbal Cheema	13,806	15.44	
PML(Q)	Asad Hafeez Goraya	5,541	6.20	
PPP	Hafiz Shahbaz Hassan Warya	4,633	5.18	
Others	Others (fifteen candidates)	2,190	2.45	
Turnout		90,975	56.38	
Total valid votes		89,427	98.30	
Rejected ballots		1,548	1.70	
Majority		49,451	55.30	
Registered electors		161,362		

== General elections 2008 ==
Provincial election 2008: PP-129 Sialkot-IX
Party	Candidate	Votes	%	±%
PML(N)	Jamil Ashraf	36,798	50.32	
PML(Q)	Ch.Ansar Iqbal Baryar	20,178	27.59	
PPP	Usman Javed Guhmman	16,057	21.96	
Others	Others	99	0.14	
Turnout		75,173	57.67	
Total valid votes		73,132	97.28	
Rejected ballots		2,041	2.72	
Majority		16,620	22.73	
Registered electors		130,355		

== See also ==
- PP-49 Sialkot-VI
- PP-51 Sialkot-VIII
