= PP-170 Lahore-XXVI =

Constituency of the Provincial Assembly of Punjab, Pakistan

- Constituency for the Provincial Assembly of Punjab
- Region: Lahore City in Lahore District

Current constituency
- Created from: PP-147 Lahore-XI (2002-2018); PP-169 Lahore-XXVI (2018-2023)

PP-170 Lahore-XXVI (پی پی-170، لاہور-26) is a Constituency of Provincial Assembly of Punjab.

== General elections 2024 ==
Provincial election 2024: PP-170 Lahore-XXVI
Party	Candidate	Votes	%	±%
Independent	Mian Muhammad Haroon Akbar (Note: Filed nomination papers as PTI candidate but ECP allowed him to run as an Independent)	64,143	52.17	
PML(N)	Rana Ahsan	40,661	33.07	
TLP	Muhammad Bilal	7,851	6.39	
IPP	Sana Adeel	2,432	1.98	
JI	Ahmad Raza Butt	2,392	1.95	
Others	Others (thirty candidates)	5,473	4.44	
Turnout		125,117	40.15	
Total valid votes		122,952	98.27	
Rejected ballots		2,165	1.73	
Majority		23,482	19.10	
Registered electors		311,622		
hold				

== General elections 2018 ==
Provincial election 2018: PP-169 Lahore-XXVI
Party	Candidate	Votes	%	±%
PML(N)	Akhtar Hussain	31,460	54.17	
PTI	Nakash Saleem	13,236	22.79	
TLP	Shaukat Ali	4,882	8.41	
PPP	Nasir Mehmood	4,678	8.06	
APML	Yousaf Shoukat	1,457	2.51	
TLI	Salamat Ali Chishti	838	1.44	
NP	Noba Asif	793	1.37	
Others	Others (nine candidates)	729	1.25	
Turnout		59,337	53.46	
Total valid votes		58,073	97.87	
Rejected ballots		1,264	2.13	
Majority		18,224	31.38	
Registered electors		110,990		

== Bye Elections 2015 ==
Contesting candidates	Party affiliation	Votes polled

Bye Election 2015: Lahore-VI
Party	Candidate	Votes	%
PTI	Shoaib Saddique	31,763	51%
PML.N	Mian Mohsin Latif	19,855	38%
PPPP	Iftikhar Shahid	725	1%

== General elections 2013 ==
Provincial election 2013: PP-147 Lahore-XI
Party	Candidate	Votes	%	±%
PML(N)	Mohsin Latif	36,781	50.16	
PTI	Muhammad Shoaib Siddiqui	30,174	41.15	
JI	Ameer Ul Azim	1,890	2.58	
PPP	Iftikhar Shahid Advocate	1,873	2.55	
Others	Others (sixteen candidates)	2,613	3.56	
Turnout		74,297	56.71	
Total valid votes		73,331	98.70	
Rejected ballots		966	1.30	
Majority		6,607	9.01	
Registered electors		131,002		

== See also ==
- PP-169 Lahore-XXV
- PP-171 Lahore-XXVII
