= PP-179 Kasur-V =

Constituency of the Provincial Assembly of Punjab, Pakistan

- Constituency for the Provincial Assembly of Punjab
- Region: Kasur Tehsil (partly) including Khudian town and Chunian Tehsil (partly) including Jajjal town of Kasur District

Current constituency
- Created from: PP-179 Kasur-V (2002-2018); PP-176 Kasur-III (2018-2023)

PP-179 Kasur-V (پی پی-179، قصور-5) is a Constituency of Provincial Assembly of Punjab.

== General elections 2024 ==
Provincial election 2024: PP-179 Kasur-V
Party	Candidate	Votes	%	±%
PML(N)	Malik Ahmad Khan	65,623	52.38	
Independent	Sardar Nadir Farook Ali (Note: Filed nomination papers as PTI candidate but ECP allowed him to run as an Independent)	47,665	38.05	
TLP	Mansoor Ahmad	4,994	3.99	
PPP	Muhammad Rafique shahzad	2,450	1.96	
IPP	Malik Mukhtar Ahmad	2,109	1.68	
Others	Others (eleven candidates)	2,432	1.94	
Turnout		127,973	59.99	
Total valid votes		125,273	97.89	
Rejected ballots		2,700	2.11	
Majority		17,958	14.33	
Registered electors		213,322		
hold				

== General elections 2018 ==
Provincial election 2018: PP-176 Kasur-III
Party	Candidate	Votes	%	±%
PML(N)	Malik Muhammad Ahmad Khan	50,339	41.10	
PTI	Sardar Muhammad Hussain Dogar	31,486	25.71	
Independent	Shahid Masood	18,704	15.27	
MMA	Muhammad Javed	7,060	5.76	
PPP	Munir Ahmad	5,144	4.20	
TLP	Sabir Ali Babar	4,039	3.30	
Independent	Sardar Mushtaq Ahmad	2,285	1.87	
Independent	Muhammad Abid Jamal	1,472	1.20	
Others	Others (five candidates)	1,957	1.60	
Turnout		126,938	62.81	
Total valid votes		122,486	96.49	
Rejected ballots		4,452	3.51	
Majority		18,853	15.39	
Registered electors		202,108		

== General elections 2013 ==
Provincial election 2013: PP-179 Kasur-V
Party	Candidate	Votes	%	±%
PML(N)	Malak Muhammad Ahmad Khan	45,012	49.37	
PPP	Malik Khurram Shehzad	17,677	19.39	
PTI	Sardar Muhammad Hussain Dogar	12,242	13.43	
Independent	Shabbir Hussain	11,180	12.26	
Independent	Malak Zafar Iqbal	1,819	2.00	
Others	Others (twenty one candidates)	3,242	3.56	
Turnout		94,219	64.54	
Total valid votes		91,172	96.77	
Rejected ballots		3,047	3.23	
Majority		27,335	29.98	
Registered electors		145,996		

== General elections 2008 ==
Contesting candidates	Party affiliation	Votes polled

== See also ==
- PP-178 Kasur-IV
- PP-180 Kasur-VI
