= PP-31 Gujrat-V =

Constituency of the Punjabi Provincial Legislature, Pakistan

- Constituency for the Provincial Assembly of Punjab
- Region: Gujrat Tehsil (partly) including northern parts of Gujrat city in Gujrat District

Current constituency
- Created from: PP-111 Gujrat-IV (2002-2018); PP-31 Gujrat-IV (2018-2023)

PP-31 Gujrat-V (پی پی-33، گجرات-5) is a Constituency of Provincial Assembly of Punjab.

== General elections 2024 ==
Provincial election 2024: PP-31 Gujrat-V
Party	Candidate	Votes	%	±%
PML(Q)	Shafay Hussain	55,724	46.07	
Independent	Mudassar Raza (Note: Filed nomination papers as PTI candidate but ECP allowed him to run as an Independent)	51,665	42.72	
TLP	Adeel Arshad	6,704	5.54	
JI	Chaudary Ansar Mehmood	3,604	2.98	
Others	Others (twenty candidates)	3,251	2.69	
Turnout		122,360	40.90	
Total valid votes		120,948	98.85	
Rejected ballots		1,412	1.15	
Majority		4,059	3.35	
Registered electors		299,176		
hold				

== General elections 2018 ==
Provincial election 2018: PP-31 Gujrat-IV
Party	Candidate	Votes	%	±%
PTI	Saleem Sarwar Jaura	51,131	48.50	
PML(N)	Imran Zafar	20,513	19.46	
Independent	Aurangzeb	13,331	12.64	
TLP	Kashif Hussain	9,075	8.61	
MMA	Tariq Saleem	2,522	2.39	
PPP	Ch. Rizwan Ahmad	2,391	2.27	
TLI	Hafiz Abd Ur Rehman	1,602	1.52	
Others	Others (seventeen candidates)	4,870	4.61	
Turnout		107,899	45.16	
Total valid votes		105,435	97.72	
Rejected ballots		2,464	2.28	
Majority		30,618	29.04	
Registered electors		238,941		

== General elections 2013 ==
Provincial election 2013: PP-111 Gujrat-IV
Party	Candidate	Votes	%	±%
PML(N)	Imran Zafar	35,515	37.69	
PTI	Saleem Sarwar Jaura	31,215	33.12	
PML(Q)	Mian Imran Masood	19,841	21.05	
PPP	Zahid Hussain Saleemi	3,739	3.97	
JI	Dr. Tariq Saleem	2,413	2.56	
Others	Others (twenty three candidates)	1,516	1.61	
Turnout		95,797	48.10	
Total valid votes		94,239	98.37	
Rejected ballots		1,558	1.63	
Majority		4,300	4.57	
Registered electors		199,154		

== General elections 2008 ==
Provincial election 2008 : PP-111 Gujrat-IV
Party	Candidate	Votes	%	±%
PML(N)	Haji Nasir Mahmood	25,567	45.49	
PPP	Ch. Ahmed Mukhtar	16,625	29.58	
PML(Q)	Mian Imran Masood	13,341	23.74	
Independent	Mian Haroon Masood	258	0.46	
Independent	Waqar Hussain Tahir	169	0.30	
Independent	Syed Aleem Imtiaz	98	0.17	
Independent	Muhammad Azhar Butt	75	0.13	
Independent	Majid Hamayyun	36	0.06	
Independent	Imrana Khalid	16	0.03	
Independent	Ch. Muhammad Fawaz	15	0.03	
Turnout		59,474	36.85	
Total valid votes		56,200	94.50	
Rejected ballots		3,274	5.50	
Majority		8,942	15.91	
Registered electors		161,394		

== See also ==
- PP-30 Gujrat-IV
- PP-32 Gujrat-VI
