= Allah-o-Akbar Tehreek =

Political party in Pakistan

Allah-o-Akbar Tehreek الله أكبر تحریک
- Abbreviation: AAT
- Adnaa Khadim: Muhammad Aslam Rabbani
- Founder: Mian Ihsan Bari
- Headquarters: Bahawalpur, Punjab, Pakistan
- Ideology: Islamism
- Religion: Islam
- Colors: Yellow, Red & Green
- Slogan: حق کی جنگ; Haq ki Jang (lit. 'War of Truth')

Election symbol

Party flag

Website
- allahoakbar-tehreek.com

Allah-o-Akbar Tehreek (AAT) (Urdu: الله أكبر تحریک, romanized: Allahu-Akbar Tehreek, lit. 'God is Great Movement') is a political party in Pakistan founded in 2016 by Dr. Mian Ihsan Bari.

== 2018 General Elections ==
AAT emerged as the 12th largest political party by securing 172,120 (0.32%) votes. However, the party failed to win any seat in the 2018 general elections.

== Controversy ==
It is believed to have a political connection with the Milli Muslim League whose registration has been rejected several times by the Election Commission of Pakistan due to being affiliated with Jama'at-ud-Da'wah's Hafiz Saeed. AAT fielded most of its candidates from the Milli Muslim League but failed to get any seat in 2018 general elections.

== Electoral history ==
Election	Votes	Seats	%	+/–	Source
2018	172,120	0.32	0 / 342	Steady	ECP

== See also ==
- Milli Muslim League
