= List of roads in Faisalabad =

Dijkot Road Faisalabad

This is a list of the notable roads connecting Faisalabad, the third most populous city in Pakistan, with other cities of the country. It also includes a list of underpasses, and flyovers within Faisalabad.

== Motorways ==
- M4 Motorway (Pakistan) (Pindi Bhattian) - (Multan)
- M3 Motorway (Pakistan) (Lahore) - (Abdul Hakeem)

== Highways ==
- Faisalabad Canal Expressway

== Main Roads ==
Name	Extension		Nearby Places
Name	From	To	Nearby Places
Faisalabad-Sangla Hill Road	Faisalabad	Sangla Hill	Chak Jhumra, Sahianwala and Salarwala
Faisalabad–Shahkot–Sheikhupura Road	Faisalabad	Sheikhupura	Shahkot
Faisalabad–Chiniot Road	Faisalabad	Chiniot	
Faisalabad-Jhang Road	Faisalabad	Jhang	Painsra
Faisalabad-Samundri Road	Faisalabad	Samundri	Dasuha
Faisalabad-Jaranwala Road	Faisalabad	Jaranwala	Jaranwala

== Flyovers in Faisalabad ==
- Nishatabad Flyover
- Abdullahpur Flyover
- novelty bridge Flyover (Approved)
- Tariqabad Bridge to Chak Jhumra Road (Approved)
- JHal Khanuana Chowk Flyover

== Underpasses ==
- Nusrat Fateh Ali Khan Underpass
- Barakat Ali Underpass
- Jhall Road Underpass
- Lyallpur Underpass
- Chenab Chowk Underpass (Planning)
- Novelty Underpass (Approved)
- Kashmir Bridge Underpass

== See also ==
- List of places in Faisalabad
