= Faisalabad–Sangla Hill Road =

Road in Punjab, Pakistan

Faisalabad–Sangla Hill Road (Sangla-Jhumra Road) فیصل آباد – سانگلہ ہِل سڑک

Route information
- Maintained by Punjab Highway Department
- Length: 50 km (31 mi)

Major junctions
- From: Bus Station Lari Adda, Faisalabad
- Millat Chok; Nishatabad; Bhaiwala; Faisalabad Dry Port; Chak Jhumra; Salarwala; Sangla hill City
- To: Sangla Hill, Nankana Sahib District

Location
- Country: Pakistan

Highway system
- Roads in Pakistan

Faisalabad–Sangla Hill Road (Punjabi, Urdu: فیصل آباد – سانگلہ ہِل سڑک), also known locally as Sangla-Jhumra Road, is a provincially maintained road in Punjab, Pakistan, that connects the cities of Faisalabad and Sangla Hill. This road connects the two districts Faisalabad and Nankana Sahib District tehsil Sangla Hill. The major stop is Chak Jhumra, famous due to connectivity. it connects the Sangla hill and Faisalabad. The famous junction of Chak Jhumra Junction railway station is also located on this road. This road also pass through the chak jhumra industrial zone.

On this road there are several villages that are famous due to their living personalities like the Muhammad Ajmal Cheema, Muhammad Afzal Sahi, Ali Afzal Sahi, Junaid Afzal Sahi and Ghulam Rasool Sahi . All personalities residence are on this road.

== Features ==
- Length - 50 km
- Lanes - Single lane
- Speed limit - Universal minimum speed limit of 40 km/h and a maximum speed limit of 60 km/h for heavy transport vehicles and 80 km/h for light transport vehicles.
- The people use bus transportation in this road.
- Cheema, Wahla and Bajwa bus transportation companies are famous on this road.
- This road is famous due to bus driving.
