= Shamsabad, Faisalabad =

Shamsabad
- Village
- Location within Pakistan
- Coordinates: 30°53′05″N 72°26′25″E
- Country: Pakistan
- Province: Punjab
- District: Faisalabad
- Time zone: UTC+5 (PST)
- Calling code: 042

Shamsabad is a village in Faisalabad District of Punjab, Pakistan. Neighboring areas are Bhaiwala and Nishatabad. Shamsabad is adjacent to Nishatabad Flyover on Jhumra Road.
