= Chaudhry Muhammad Hanif =

Pakistani politician (1963–2026)

- چودھری محمد حنیف

Member of the Provincial Assembly of the Punjab
- In office October 2025 – 17 September 2026

Member of the Provincial Assembly of the Punjab
- In office 29 May 2013 – 31 May 2018
- Constituency: PP-203 Sahiwal-VI

Member of the Provincial Assembly of the Punjab
- In office February 2008 – February 2013
- Constituency: PP-203 Sahiwal-VI

Personal details
- Born: 9 November 1963 Chichawatni, West Pakistan, Pakistan
- Died: 17 September 2026 (aged 62)
- Party: Pakistan Muslim League (N) (2013–2026)
- Other political affiliations: Pakistan Muslim League (Q) (2002–2013)
- Children: Muhammad Asad Hanif Jutt (son)
- Relatives: Chaudhry Muhammad Tufail (brother); Chaudhry Muhammad Arshad Jutt (brother)

Chaudhry Muhammad Hanif Jutt (Urdu: چودھری محمد حنیف جٹ; 9 November 1963 – 17 September 2026) was a Pakistani politician who was a member of Provincial Assembly of the Punjab beginning in October 2025 and from February 2008 to May 2018.

== Early life and education ==
Hanif was born in Chichawatni on 9 November 1963. He graduated in 1986 from University of the Punjab.

== Political career ==
Hanif was elected to the Provincial Assembly of the Punjab as a candidate of the Pakistan Muslim League (Q) from Constituency PP-226 (Sahiwal-VII) in the 2008 Pakistani general election.

He was re-elected to the Punjab Assembly as a candidate of the Pakistan Muslim League (Nawaz) from Constituency PP-226 (Sahiwal-VII) in the 2013 Pakistani general election.

Hanif was re-elected to the Punjab Assembly as a candidate of PML-N from Constituency PP-203 Sahiwal-VI in the October 2025 by election.

== Death ==
Hanif died from a cardiac arrest on 17 September 2026, at the age of 62.
