= Talal Chaudhry =

State Interior Minister of Pakistan

- طلال چوہدری
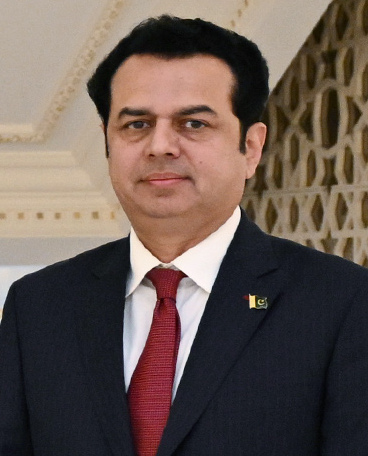
- Chaudhary in 2025

Minister of State for Interior
- Incumbent
- Assumed office 8 March 2025
- President: Asif Ali Zardari
- Prime Minister: Shehbaz Sharif
- Minister: Mohsin Naqvi
- In office 4 August 2017 – 31 May 2018
- President: Mamnoon Hussain
- Prime Minister: Shahid Khaqan Abbasi
- Minister: Ahsan Iqbal

Parliamentary Secretary for Information Technology and Science and Technology
- In office 1 June 2013 – 27 July 2017
- President: Asif Ali Zardari; Mamnoon Hussain
- Prime Minister: Nawaz Sharif

Member of the Senate of Pakistan
- Incumbent
- Assumed office 9 April 2024
- Constituency: General Seat from Punjab

Member of the National Assembly of Pakistan
- In office 1 June 2013 – 31 May 2018
- Constituency: NA-76 (Faisalabad)

Personal details
- Born: 19 August 1973 (age 53)
- Party: PMLN (2008-present)

Talal Chaudhry (Urdu: طلال چوہدری; born 19 August 1973) is a Pakistani politician, currently serving Minister of State for Interior, since March 2025, also serving as a Member of the Senate of Pakistan (Senator) from since April 2024.

Previously, he was a member of the National Assembly of Pakistan, from June 2013 to May 2018.He served as the Federal Parliamentary Secretary for Information Technology and Science and Technology in the cabinet of Nawaz Sharif from 2013 to 2017. He served as Minister of State for Interior, in Abbasi cabinet from August 2017 to May 2018.

Now serving as an Senator (MP) from Punjab and Minister of State for Interior.

== Early life and education ==
Talal was born on 19 August 1973.

His uncle Muhammad Akram Chaudhry is a politician, being a former town nazim Jaranwala. Active in the PP-47 (Faisalabad) constituency, Akram Chaudhry, an agriculturist, businessman and social worker, has also served as President of Pakistan Muslim League (N) at the tehsil level and as Minister for Auqaf, Ushr and Zakat from 1990 to 1993.

In terms of education, Talal has earned a Bachelor of Science (BSc Honors), a Bachelor of Law (LLB) and a Masters of Business Administration (MBA).

== Political career ==
Talal ran for the seat of the National Assembly of Pakistan as a candidate of Pakistan Muslim League (N) (PML-N) from Constituency NA-77 (Faisalabad-III) in the 2008 Pakistani general election but was unsuccessful. He received 49,807 votes and lost the seat to Muhammad Asim Nazir. In the same election, he ran for the seat of the Provincial Assembly of the Punjab as an independent candidate from Constituency PP-53 (Faisalabad-III) and from Constituency PP-55 (Faisalabad-V)

He was elected to the National Assembly as a candidate of PML-N from Constituency NA-76 (Faisalabad-II) in the 2013 Pakistani general election. He received 101,797 votes and defeated Malik Nawab Sher Wasseer, a candidate of Pakistan Peoples Party (PPP) with a lead of 60,000+ votes. During his tenure as Member of the National Assembly, he served as the Federal Parliamentary Secretary for Information Technology and Science and Technology.

Following the election of Shahid Khaqan Abbasi as Prime Minister of Pakistan in August 2017, he was inducted into the federal cabinet of Abbasi as Minister of State for Interior. Upon the dissolution of the National Assembly on the expiration of its term on 31 May 2018, Chaudhry ceased to hold the office as Minister of State for Interior.

In March 2018, the Supreme Court of Pakistan indicted Chaudhry for committing contempt of court. Chuadhry rejected the contempt allegations. In August 2018, the Supreme Court found Chaudhry guilty of contempt of court and disqualified him from holding public office and from contesting elections for five years. This judgment was believed to be a result of political victimisation the judgment later increased Tallal Chaudry’s popularity because the public was convinced that it was a result of him being loyal to his leadership and party. The three-judge bench also slapped him a fine of Rs 100,000. In September 2018, he challenged the verdict of the Supreme Court.

In the 2018 Pakistani general election Talal lost his seat NA-102 securing 97869 votes against Pakistan Tehreek-e-Insaf candidate Malik Nawab Sher Waseer.

In 2024 he decided not to run in the 2024 general election after not being awarded a ticket by PML-N. In the 2024 Pakistani Senate Election, he was elected Senator from a PML-N ticket, from Punjab Province.

In 2025, he was appointed as Minister of State for Interior and Narcotics, he was loyalist of Nawaz Sharif thats why he appointed as State Minister.

== Electoral history ==
=== 2013 ===
General election 2013: NA-76 Faisalabad-II
Party	Candidate	Votes	%	±%
PML(N)	Talal Chaudhry	101,459	55	+28
PPP	Malik Nawab Sher Waseer	34,752	18.8%	−12.2
PTI	Muhammad Waqar Wasi Chaudhary	17,490	9.5%	
Others	Others (twenty-three candidates)	30,843	16.7	
PML(N) gain from PPP				

=== 2018 ===
General election 2018: NA-102 (Faisalabad-II)
Party	Candidate	Votes	%
PTI	Malik Nawab Sher Waseer	109,708	40.20
PML(N)	Talal Chaudhry	97,869	35.86
PPP	Shahjhan Khan	19,557	7.33
Others	Others (thirteen candidates)	39,058	14.66
