= Chaudhry Muhammad Tufail =

Pakistani politician

Chaudhary Muhammad Tufail Jutt
- چوہدری محمد طفیل جٹ

Member of the National Assembly of Pakistan
- Incumbent
- Assumed office 27 November 2025
- Preceded by: Rai Hassan Nawaz
- Constituency: NA-143 Sahiwal-III

Member of the National Assembly of Pakistan
- In office 29 September 2016 – 31 May 2018
- Constituency: NA-162 (Sahiwal-III)

Tehsil Nazim Chichawatni
- In office February 2001 – February 2009

Personal details
- Born: 25 December 1960 (age 65)
- Party: PMLN (2013–present)
- Other political affiliations: PML(Q) (2002–2013)
- Relatives: Chaudhry Muhammad Hanif (brother); Chaudhry Muhammad Arshad Jutt (brother); Muhammad Asad Hanif Jutt (nephew)

Chaudhary Muhammad Tufail Jutt (Urdu: چوہدری محمد طفیل جٹ) is a Pakistani politician who is a member of the National Assembly of Pakistan since October 2025. Previously he was a member of the National Assembly of Pakistan from September 2016 to May 2018. He also served as Tehsil Nazim Chichawati from 2001 to 2009.

== Political career ==
He has served as Tehsil Nazim of Chichawatni from 2001 to 2009.

He was elected to the National Assembly of Pakistan as a candidate of Pakistan Muslim League (N) (PML-N) from Constituency NA-162 (Sahiwal-III) in by elections held in September 2016. He received 76,580 votes and defeated Rai Muhammad Murtaza Iqbal, a candidate of Pakistan Tehreek-e-Insaf (PTI). The seat became vacant after Rai Hassan Nawaz who won it in 2013 election, was disqualified to continue in office because of inaccurate assets declaration.

In October 2017, he was appointed as Federal Parliamentary Secretary for privatisation. In 2024, he again contested election for MNA seat and secured 65,438 votes from NA-162 constituency and lost to Rai Hassan Nawaz.

He was re-elected to the National Assembly of Pakistan as a candidate of Pakistan Muslim League (N) (PML-N) from NA-143 Sahiwal-III in a by-election held on 23 November 2025. The seat became vacant after Rai Hassan Nawaz, who won it in 2024 election, was disqualified due to a court conviction. He was sworn in on 27 November 2025.
