= NA-95 Faisalabad-I =

Constituency of the National Assembly of Pakistan

- Constituency for the National Assembly of Pakistan
- Region: Chak Jhumra Tehsil, Jaranwala Tehsil (partly) and Faisalabad Sadar Tehsil (partly) of Faisalabad District
- Electorate: 535,094

Current constituency
- Party: Pakistan Tehreek-e-Insaf
- Member: Ali Afzal Sahi
- Created from: NA-75 Faisalabad-I

NA-95 Faisalabad-I (این اے-95، فیصل آباد-۱) is a constituency for the National Assembly of Pakistan.

== Members of Parliament ==
=== 2018–2023: NA-101 Faisalabad-I ===
| Election | Member | Party |
|---|---|---|
| 2018 | Muhammad Asim Nazir | PTI |

=== 2024–present: NA-95 Faisalabad-I ===
| Election | Member | Party |
|---|---|---|
| 2024 | Ali Afzal Sahi | PTI |

== Election 2002 ==
General elections were held on 10 October 2002. Ghulam Rasool Sahi of the PML-Q won by 55,464 votes.

General election 2002: NA-75 Faisalabad-I
| Party | Candidate | Votes | % | ±% |
|---|---|---|---|---|
| PML(Q) | Ghulam Rasool Sahi | 55,464 | 42.11 | |
| PPP | Wajid Mustafa Bajwa | 35,417 | 26.89 | |
| PML(N) | Misbah Ud Din Zaigham | 31,283 | 23.75 | |
| Others | Others (four candidates) | 9,558 | 7.25 | |
| Turnout | | 134,965 | 45.31 | |
| Total valid votes | | 131,722 | 97.60 | |
| Rejected ballots | | 3,243 | 2.40 | |
| Majority | | 20,047 | 15.22 | |
| Registered electors | | 297,842 | | |

== Election 2008 ==
General elections were held on 14 February 2008. Tariq Mahmood Bajwa of Pakistan Peoples Party Parliamentarians was elected to the National Assembly.

General election 2008: NA-75 Faisalabad-I
| Party | Candidate | Votes | % | ±% |
|---|---|---|---|---|
| PPP | Tariq Mehmood Bajwa | 83,699 | 54.41 | |
| PML(Q) | Ghulam Rasool Sahi | 68,196 | 44.33 | |
| Others | Others (five candidates) | 1,943 | 1.26 | |
| Turnout | | 156,369 | 58.86 | |
| Total valid votes | | 153,838 | 98.38 | |
| Rejected ballots | | 2,531 | 1.62 | |
| Majority | | 15,503 | 10.08 | |
| Registered electors | | 265,662 | | |
| PPP gain from PML(Q) | | | | |

== Election 2013 ==
Ghulam Rasool Sahi succeeded in the election 2013 and became the member of National Assembly.

General election 2013: NA-75 Faisalabad-I
| Party | Candidate | Votes | % | ±% |
|---|---|---|---|---|
| PML(N) | Ghulam Rasool Sahi | 130,300 | 66.92 | |
| PTI | Fawad Ahmad Cheema | 49,131 | 25.23 | |
| Others | Others (eighteen candidates) | 15,268 | 7.85 | |
| Turnout | | 198,540 | 61.70 | |
| Total valid votes | | 194,699 | 98.07 | |
| Rejected ballots | | 3,841 | 1.93 | |
| Majority | | 81,169 | 41.69 | |
| Registered electors | | 321,768 | | |
| PML(N) gain from PPP | | | | |

== Election 2018 ==
General elections were held on 25 July 2018.

General election 2018: NA-101 Faisalabad-I
| Party | Candidate | Votes | % | ±% |
|---|---|---|---|---|
| Independent | Muhammad Asim Nazir | 147,812 | 55.31 | |
| PTI | Zafar Zulqarnain Sahi | 86,575 | 32.39 | |
| Others | Others (twelve candidates) | 26,457 | 9.90 | |
| Turnout | | 267,262 | 58.19 | |
| Rejected ballots | | 6,418 | 2.40 | |
| Majority | | 61,237 | 22.92 | |
| Registered electors | | 459,268 | | |
| Independent gain from PML(N) | | | | |

== Election 2024 ==
General elections took place on 8 February 2024. Ali Afzal Sahi, an independent candidate supported by PTI won with 144,229 votes.

General election 2024: NA-95 Faisalabad-I
| Party | Candidate | Votes | % | ±% |
|---|---|---|---|---|
| PTI | Ali Afzal Sahi (Note: Filed nomination papers as PTI candidate but ECP allowed him to run as an Independent) | 144,229 | 52.00 | ▲19.61 |
| PML(N) | Azad Ali Tabassum | 93,586 | 33.74 | N/A |
| TLP | Ghulam Meeran Shah Gilani | 19,071 | 6.88 | ▲3.06 |
| PPP | Usman Nawaz | 8,788 | 3.17 | ▲0.84 |
| Others | Others (twenty-one candidates) | 11,686 | 4.21 | ▼5.69 |
| Total valid votes | | 277,360 | 97.60 | |
| Rejected ballots | | 6,817 | 2.40 | |
| Turnout | | 284,177 | 55.22 | ▼2.97 |
| Majority | | 50,643 | 18.26 | ▼4.67 |
| Registered electors | | 535,094 | | |

== See also ==
- NA-94 Chiniot-II
- NA-96 Faisalabad-II
