= Muhammad Bilal Badar =

Pakistani politician

Member of the National Assembly of Pakistan
- Incumbent
- Assumed office 27 November 2025
- Preceded by: Rai Haider Ali Khan
- Constituency: NA-96 Faisalabad-II

Personal details
- Party: PMLN (2025-present)
- Occupation: Politician

Muhammad Bilal Badar is a Pakistani politician who has been a member of the National Assembly of Pakistan since November 2025.

He was elected to the National Assembly as a candidate of the Pakistan Muslim League (N) (PML-N) from Constituency NA-96 Faisalabad-II in a by-election held on 23 November 2025. He received 93,009 votes and defeated independent candidate Malik Nawab Sher Waseer, who received 43,025 votes. The seat became vacant due to the disqualification of a Pakistan Tehreek-e-Insaf (PTI) lawmaker following convictions related to the May 2023 riots.

== See also ==
- List of members of the 16th National Assembly of Pakistan
