= Rai Haider Ali Khan =

Pakistani politician

- راۓ حیدر علی خان

Member of the National Assembly of Pakistan
- In office 29 February 2024 – 5 August 2025
- Succeeded by: Muhammad Bilal Badar
- Constituency: NA-96 Faisalabad-II

Member of the Provincial Assembly of the Punjab
- In office 15 August 2018 – 14 January 2023
- Constituency: PP-101 Faisalabad-V
- In office 29 May 2013 – 31 May 2018

Personal details
- Born: 23 March 1967 (age 59) Faisalabad, Punjab, Pakistan
- Party: PTI (2023-present)
- Other political affiliations: PMLN (2013-2023)

Rai Haider Ali Khan (Urdu: راۓ حیدر علی خان) is a Pakistani politician who has been a member of the National Assembly of Pakistan from February 2024 to August 2025 He was also a member of the Provincial Assembly of the Punjab, from May 2013 to May 2018 and from July 2018 to January 2023.

== Early life and education ==
He was born on 23 March 1967.

He has a degree of Bachelor of Arts which he obtained in 1986 from Government College University, Lahore and has a degree of Bachelor of Laws (LLB) which he received in 1991 from Punjab University Law College.

== Political career ==
He was elected to the Provincial Assembly of the Punjab as a candidate of the Pakistan Muslim League (Nawaz) (PML-N) from PP-54 (Faisalabad-IV) in the 2013 Punjab provincial election. He served as Advisor to Chief Minister of Punjab Shehbaz Sharif for Literacy and Non-Formal Basic Education before being appointed Advisor to Chief Minister on Tourism in November 2016.

He was re-elected to Provincial Assembly of the Punjab as a candidate of the PML-N from PP-101 (Faisalabad-V) in the 2018 Punjab provincial election.

He joined the Pakistan Tehreek-e-Insaf (PTI) on 2 February 2023.

He was elected to the National Assembly of Pakistan from NA-96 Faisalabad-II as an independent candidate supported by PTI in the 2024 Pakistani general election. He received 134,724 votes and defeated Malik Nawab Sher Waseer, a candidate of PML(N).

On 31 July 2025, Khan and 195 others were convicted by a court in Faisalabad and sentenced to up to 10 years' imprisonment over the 2023 Pakistani protests. On 5 August 2025, Election Commission of Pakistan disqualified him due to his conviction.
