= Rai Hassan Nawaz =

Pakistani politician

- رائے حسن نواز

Member of the National Assembly of Pakistan
- In office 29 February 2024 – 5 August 2025
- Succeeded by: Chaudhry Muhammad Tufail
- Constituency: NA-143 Sahiwal-III
- In office 19 June 2013 – 12 May 2015
- Succeeded by: Chaudhry Muhammad Tufail
- Constituency: NA-162 Sahiwal-III

Personal details
- Born: 1 November 1955 (age 71) Chichawatni, Punjab, Pakistan
- Party: PTI (2011-present)
- Other political affiliations: PML(Q) (2001-2011); PMLN (1993-2001); IJI (1988-1990)
- Relations: Rai Muhammad Murtaza Iqbal (nephew)

Rai Hassan Nawaz (Urdu: رائے حسن نواز; born 1 November 1955) is a Pakistani politician who had been a member of the National Assembly of Pakistan from February 2024 to August 2025 and previously served in this position between 2013 and 2015. Previously, he served three terms on the Punjab Assembly, from 1988 to 1990, 1990 to 1993, and 1997 to 1999.

== Political career ==
He was elected to the Provincial Assembly of the Punjab as a candidate for Islami Jamhoori Ittehad (IJI) for Constituency PP-185 (Sahiwal) in the 1988 Pakistani general election and served as advisor to the Chief Minister of Punjab Nawaz Sharif.

He was re-elected to the Provincial Assembly of the Punjab as a candidate for IJI for Constituency PP-185 (Sahiwal) in the 1990 Pakistani general election and served as advisor to the Chief Minister of Punjab.

He ran for the Provincial Assembly of the Punjab as a cacandidate of PML-N for Constituency PP-185 (Sahiwal) in the 1993 Pakistani general election but was unsuccessful. He lost the seat to Muhammad Munir Azhar of Pakistan Peoples Party.

He was re-elected to the Provincial Assembly of the Punjab as a candidate for Pakistan Muslim League (N) for Constituency PP-185 (Sahiwal) in the 1997 Pakistani general election.

He served as district Nazim of Sahiwal District in 2005.

He was elected to the National Assembly of Pakistan from Constituency NA-162 as a candidate of Pakistan Tehreek-e-Insaf (PTI) in the 2013 Pakistani general election. He was disqualified for life in February 2015 by Supreme Court of Pakistan on charges of concealing Assets.

However, on 8 January 2024, the Supreme Court ruled that the lifetime disqualification was beyond the scope of Article 62(1)(f) of the Constitution and therefore, he became eligible to contest the 2024 elections.

He was re-elected to the National Assembly from NA-143 Sahiwal-III as an independent candidate supported by PTI in the 2024 Pakistani general election. He received 147,886 votes and defeated Chaudhry Muhammad Tufail, another independent candidate.

On 31 July 2025, Nawaz and 195 others were convicted by a court in Faisalabad and sentenced to up to 10 years' imprisonment over the 2023 Pakistani protests. On 5 August 2025, Election Commission of Pakistan disqualified him due to his conviction.
