= Chawdhary Zaheeruddin Khan =

Pakistani politician (born 1945)

- چودھری ظہیرالدین خان
- Khan in 2019

Provincial Minister of Punjab for Public Prosecution
- In office 6 September 2018 – 10 April 2022

Member of the Provincial Assembly of the Punjab
- In office 15 August 2018 – 14 January 2023
- Constituency: PP-100 Faisalabad-IV

Personal details
- Born: 22 February 1945 (age 81) Faisalabad, Punjab, Pakistan
- Party: Istehkam-e-Pakistan Party (2023–present)
- Other political affiliations: Pakistan Tehreek-e-Insaf (2018–2022) Pakistan Muslim League – Quaid (2002–2013) Pakistan Muslim League – Nawaz (1997–2002) Pakistan People's Party (1988–1997) Islami Jamhuri Ittihad (1985–1988)

Chawdhary Zaheeruddin Khan (Note: Urdu: چودھری ظہیرالدین خان) (born on 22 February 1945) is a Pakistani politician who served as Provincial Minister of Punjab for Public Prosecution from 2018 to 2022. He also served as Member of the Provincial Assembly of Punjab from 2018 to 2023.

Previously, he was a member of the Punjab Assembly from 1988 to 1990, from 1993 to 1996, from 2002 to 2007 and again from 2008 to 2013. Khan is currently serving as the president of IPP's West Punjab chapter.

== Early life and education ==
He was born on 22 February 1945 in Gurdaspur, India.

He graduated from the University of the Punjab in 1969 and received a degree of Bachelor of Arts.

== Political career ==
He was elected to the Provincial Assembly of the Punjab as a candidate of Pakistan Peoples Party (PPP) from Constituency PP-46 (Faisalabad-IV) in the 1988 Pakistani general election. He received 21,761 votes and defeated Muhammad Akram Chaudhry, a candidate of Islami Jamhuri Ittihad (IJI).

He ran for the seat of the Provincial Assembly of the Punjab as a candidate of Pakistan Democratic Alliance (PDA) from Constituency PP-46 (Faisalabad-IV) in 1990 Pakistani general election but was unsuccessful. He received 15,607 votes and lost the seat to Muhammad Akram Chaudhary, a candidate of IJI.

He was re-elected to the Provincial Assembly of the Punjab as a candidate of PPP from Constituency PP-46 (Faisalabad-IV) in the 1993 Pakistani general election. He received 29,896 votes and defeated Muhammad Akram Chaudhary, a candidate of Pakistan Muslim League – Nawaz (PMLPakistan Muslim League – NawazN).

He ran for the seat of the Provincial Assembly of the Punjab as an independent candidate from Constituency PP-55 (Faisalabad-IV) in 1997 Pakistani general election but was unsuccessful. He received 7,607 votes and lost the seat to Muhammad Akram Chaudhary, a candidate of PML-N.

He was re-elected to the Provincial Assembly of the Punjab as a candidate of Pakistan Muslim League – Quaid (PML–Q) from Constituency PP-55 (Faisalabad-V) in the 2002 Pakistani general election. He received 24,370 votes and defeated Talib Hussain Ijaz, a candidate of PPP. On 3 January 2003, he was inducted into the provincial Punjab cabinet of Chief Minister Chaudhry Pervaiz Elahi and was appointed Provincial Minister of Punjab for Communications and Works.

He was re-elected to the Provincial Assembly of the Punjab as a candidate of PML-Q from Constituency PP-55 (Faisalabad-V) in the 2008 Pakistani general election. He received 26,520 votes and defeated Rana Muhammad Idress Khan, a candidate of PML-N.

In March 2008, he became leader of the opposition in the Punjab Assembly. In March 2011, he resigned as leader of the opposition in the Punjab Assembly.

He ran for the seat of the National Assembly of Pakistan as a candidate of PML-Q from Constituency NA-77 (Faisalabad-III) in the 2013 Pakistani general election but was unsuccessful. He received 58,680 votes and lost the seat to Muhammad Asim Nazir. In the same election, he ran for the seat of the Provincial Assembly of the Punjab as a candidate of PML-Q from Constituency PP-55 (Faisalabad-V) but was unsuccessful. He received 27,117 votes and lost the seat to Rana Shoaib Adrees Khan.

He was re-elected to the Provincial Assembly of the Punjab as a candidate of Pakistan Tehreek-e-Insaf from Constituency PP-100 (Faisalabad-IV) in the 2018 Pakistani general election.

On 27 August 2018, he was inducted into the provincial Punjab cabinet of Chief Minister Sardar Usman Buzdar without any ministerial portfolio. On 6 September 2018, he was appointed Provincial Minister of Punjab for public prosecution.

Khan later joined the Istehkam-e-Pakistan Party (IPP). In February 2025, he was appointed president of IPP West Punjab by the party's president Aleem Khan.
