= Nauman Ahmad Langrial =

Pakistani politician (born 1960)

Member of the Provincial Assembly of the Punjab
- In office 15 August 2018 – 23 May 2022
- Succeeded by: Muhammad Ghulam Sarwar
- Constituency: PP-202 (Sahiwal-VII)

Member of the National Assembly of Pakistan
- In office 2008–2013
- Constituency: NA-163 (Sahiwal-IV)

Personal details
- Born: 25 June 1960 (age 66) Lahore, Punjab, Pakistan
- Party: IPP (2023-present)
- Other political affiliations: PMLN (2022-2023); PTI (2018-2022); PML(Q) (2008-2013); National Alliance (2002-2004)

Punjab Assembly Lahore

Malik Nauman Ahmad Langrial is a Pakistani politician who was a member of the Provincial Assembly of the Punjab from August 2018 till May 2022.

Previously he was a member of the National Assembly of Pakistan from 2008 to 2013 and a member of the Provincial Assembly of the Punjab from 2002 to 2007.

== Early life and education ==
He was born on 25 June 1960 in Lahore.

He graduated in 1989 and has a degree of Bachelor of Arts.

== Political career ==
He was elected to the Provincial Assembly of the Punjab from Constituency PP-226 (Sahiwal-VII) as a candidate of the National Alliance in the 2002 Pakistani general election. He received 33,693 votes and defeated Mian Asad Masood, a candidate of Pakistan Peoples Party (PPP).

He was elected to the National Assembly of Pakistan from Constituency NA-163 (Sahiwal-IV) as a candidate of the Pakistan Muslim League (Q) (PML-Q) in the 2008 Pakistani general election. He received 39,864 votes and defeated Begum Shahnaz Javed, a candidate of PPP.

He ran for the seat of the National Assembly from Constituency NA-163 (Sahiwal-IV) as a candidate of PML (Q) in the 2013 Pakistani general election but was unsuccessful. He received 67,076 votes and lost the seat to Muhammad Munir Azhar.

He was re-elected to the Provincial Assembly of the Punjab as a candidate of the Pakistan Tehreek-e-Insaf (PTI) from PP-202 Sahiwal-VII in the 2018 Pakistani general election.

On 27 August 2018, he was inducted into the provincial Punjab cabinet of Chief Minister Sardar Usman Buzdar without any ministerial portfolio. On 29 August 2018, he was appointed as Provincial Minister of Punjab for Agriculture.

In March 2021 Langrial became a part of a dissenting group from the PTI called the Jahangir Tareen group. The Jahangir Tareen group was made after Tareen, a close friend of Imran Khan and core member of the PTI, was investigated for corruption during his own government. In April 2, 2022 Langrial joined forward block against his own party Pakistan Tehreek-e-Insaf and supported opposition's candidate Hamza Shahbaz. Chaudhry Pervaiz Elahi, the Speaker, sent a reference against the dissenting MPAs, including Langrial, for defecting from their party's policy.

He was de-seated due to this vote against party policy on 16 April 2022. He ran in the resulting by-election for PP-202 Sahiwal-VII as a candidate of the Pakistan Muslim League (N) (PML(N)), but was unsuccessful. He received 59,191 votes and was defeated by Muhammad Ghulam Sarwar, a candidate of the PTI.

On 13 September 2022, he was inducted into Shehbaz Sharif Cabinet as SAPM.

On 8 June 2023, Langrial joined Istehkam-e-Pakistan, a new political party.
