= Muhammad Asad Hanif Jutt =

Pakistani politician

Member of the Provincial Assembly of Punjab
- Incumbent
- Assumed office 16 November 2026
- Preceded by: Chaudhry Muhammad Hanif
- Constituency: PP-203 Sahiwal-VI

Personal details
- Born: 20 April 1996 (age 30) Chichawatni, Punjab, Pakistan
- Party: PMLN (2026-present)
- Relations: Chaudhry Muhammad Tufail (uncle); Chaudhry Muhammad Arshad Jutt (uncle)
- Parent: Chaudhry Muhammad Hanif (father)
- Occupation: Politician

Muhammad Asad Hanif Jutt is a Pakistani politician from Chichawatni who is a member of the Provincial Assembly of Punjab since November 2026.

== Political career ==
Jutt was elected to the Provincial Assembly of Punjab in a November 2026 by-election from PP-203 Sahiwal-VI as a candidate of Pakistan Muslim League (N) (PML(N)). The by-election was called due to the death of Chaudhry Muhammad Hanif, his father. He received 42,114 votes and defeated Muhammad Awais Mahmood, a candidate of Tehreek-i-Ehsaas Pakistan (TEP).
