= Sardar Khan Bahadur Dogar =

Pakistani politician

Member of the Provincial Assembly of the Punjab
- Incumbent
- Assumed office 24 February 2024
- Constituency: PP-100 Faisalabad-III

Personal details
- Born: 10 August 1955 (age 70)
- Party: PMLN (2024-present)

Sardar Khan Bahadur Dogar (born 26 January 1960) is a Pakistani politician who has been a Member of the Provincial Assembly of the Punjab since 2024.

== Political career ==
He was elected to the Provincial Assembly of the Punjab as a candidate of the Pakistan Muslim League (N) (PML-N) from Constituency PP-100 Faisalabad-III in the 2024 Pakistani general election. Previously, his opponent, Chaudhry Umair Wasi Zafar, was declared the winner in the constituency.
