= Chaudhry Muhammad Arshad Jutt =

Pakistani politician (born 1970)

Member of the Provincial Assembly of the Punjab
- In office May 2013 – May 2018
- Constituency: PP-225 (Sahiwal-VI)

Member of the Provincial Assembly of the Punjab
- In office February 2008 – February 2013
- Constituency: PP-225 (Sahiwal-VI)

Member of the Provincial Assembly of the Punjab
- In office October 2002 – October 2007
- Constituency: PP-225 (Sahiwal-VI)

Personal details
- Born: 20 April 1970 (age 56) Chichawatni, Punjab, Pakistan
- Party: PMLN (2013–present)
- Other political affiliations: PML(Q) (2002–2013)
- Relatives: Chaudhry Muhammad Tufail (brother); Chaudhry Muhammad Hanif (brother); Muhammad Asad Hanif Jutt (nephew)

Punjab Assembly Lahore

Chaudhry Muhammad Arshad Jutt is a Pakistani politician who has been a Member of the Provincial Assembly of the Punjab, from October 2002 to May 2018.

== Early life and education ==
He was born on 20 April 1970 in Chichawatni.

He has a degree of Bachelor of Arts and a degree of Bachelor of Law which he obtained in 2001 from Bahauddin Zakariya University.

== Political career ==
He was elected to the Provincial Assembly of the Punjab as a candidate of Pakistan Peoples Party (PPP) from Constituency PP-225 (Sahiwal-VI) in the 2002 Pakistani general election. He received 35,198 votes and defeated Muhammad Munir Azhar.

He was re-elected to the Provincial Assembly of the Punjab as a candidate of Pakistan Muslim League (Q) (PML-Q) from Constituency PP-225 (Sahiwal-VI) in the 2008 Pakistani general election. He received 36,398 votes and defeated Rai Muhammad Murtaza Iqbal, an independent candidate.

He was re-elected to the Provincial Assembly of the Punjab as a candidate of Pakistan Muslim League (N) (PML-N) from Constituency PP-225 (Sahiwal-VI) in the 2013 Pakistani general election. He received 45,689 votes and defeated Rai Muhammad Murtaza Iqbal, a candidate of Pakistan Tehreek-e-Insaf (PTI).
