= Old Chichawatni =

Coordinates: 30°34′04″N 72°40′49″E

Old Chichawatni is the older part of the city of Chichawatni, in Sahiwal District, Punjab province of Pakistan.
