= Chak 26/11L =

Chak 26/11-L
- Village
- Location within Pakistan
- Coordinates: 30.41°N 73.40°E
- Country: Pakistan
- Province: Punjab
- Elevation: 167 m (548 ft)
- Time zone: UTC+5 (PST)

Chak 26/11L is a village in Chichawatni, in Sahiwal District, Punjab province of Pakistan.It is also called Shamsa Abad. It is locateted on Thana Road 2.5km West of Ghaziabad.
