= Rai Muhammad Murtaza Iqbal =

Pakistani politician

Member of the Provincial Assembly of the Punjab
- In office 23 February 2024 – 5 August 2025
- Constituency: PP-203 Sahiwal-VI

Member of the National Assembly of Pakistan
- In office 13 August 2018 – 25 January 2023
- Constituency: NA-149 (Sahiwal-III)

Personal details
- Party: PTI (2018-present)
- Relations: Rai Hassan Nawaz (uncle)

Rai Muhammad Murtaza Iqbal is a Pakistani politician who had been a member for f the Provincial Assembly of Punjab from February 2024 to August 2025. He previously had been a member of the National Assembly of Pakistan from August 2018 till January 2023.

== Personal life ==
Iqbal was born in a Muslim Bhatti Rajput family with roots in Raikot, in Indian Punjab's Jalandhar district, with an uncle who was a minister under Nawaz Sharif while another uncle, Rai Hassan Nawaz, has been a politician as well.

Iqbal's ancestor Tulsi Das converted to Islam in 1323 and took the name Rai Sirajuddin, before founding the Chakar village, another ancestor Rai Kalha I founded Talwandi Rai in 1478, another, Rai Azizullah, founded Raikot in 1648 while yet another ancestor, Rai Kamaluddin, founded Jagraon in 1680, all located in the Ludhiana district, while other influential political figures from his family include his grandfather Rai Mohammad Iqbal, an MLA from Talwandi Rai in pre-Partition Punjab while his uncle Rai Aziz Ullah has been the custodian of the Ganga Sagar, a sacred relic for Sikhs, their ancestor Rai Kalha III having hosted Guru Gobind Singh in 1705.

Iqbal is a law graduate from the University of Manchester, in the UK.

== Political career ==
He contested a July 2015 by-election from NA-162 Sahiwal-III as a candidate of Pakistan Tehreek-e-Insaf (PTI), but was unsuccessful. He received 63,211 votes and lost to Chaudhry Muhammad Tufail, a candidate of Pakistan Muslim League (N) (PML(N)).

Iqbal was elected to the National Assembly of Pakistan from NA-149 (Sahiwal-III) as a candidate of PTI in the 2018 Pakistani general election.

He was elected to the Provincial Assembly of Punjab from PP-203 Sahiwal-VI by securing 55,874 votes as an independent candidate backed by PTI in the 2024 Punjab provincial election.

On 31 July 2025, Iqbal and 195 others were convicted by a court in Faisalabad and sentenced to up to 10 years' imprisonment over the 2023 Pakistani protests. On 5 August 2025, Election Commission of Pakistan disqualified him due to his conviction.
