= Banga Chak =

- Village
- Location within Pakistan
- Coordinates: 30°53′05″N 72°26′25″E
- Country: Pakistan
- Province: Punjab
- District: Faisalabad
- Time zone: UTC+5 (PST)

Banga Chak is a village in Faisalabad District of Punjab, Pakistan. It is linked with the M3 motorway by the Sahianwala interchange. The population is primarily Punjabi and predominantly Muslim. The main crops grown here are sugarcane, wheat and rice. The village has two mosques: Jamia Masjid and Gulzar-e-Madina Masjid.
