= Muhammad Afzal Sahi =

Pakistani politician

Chaudhry Muhammad Afzal Sahi چوہدری محمد افضل ساہى
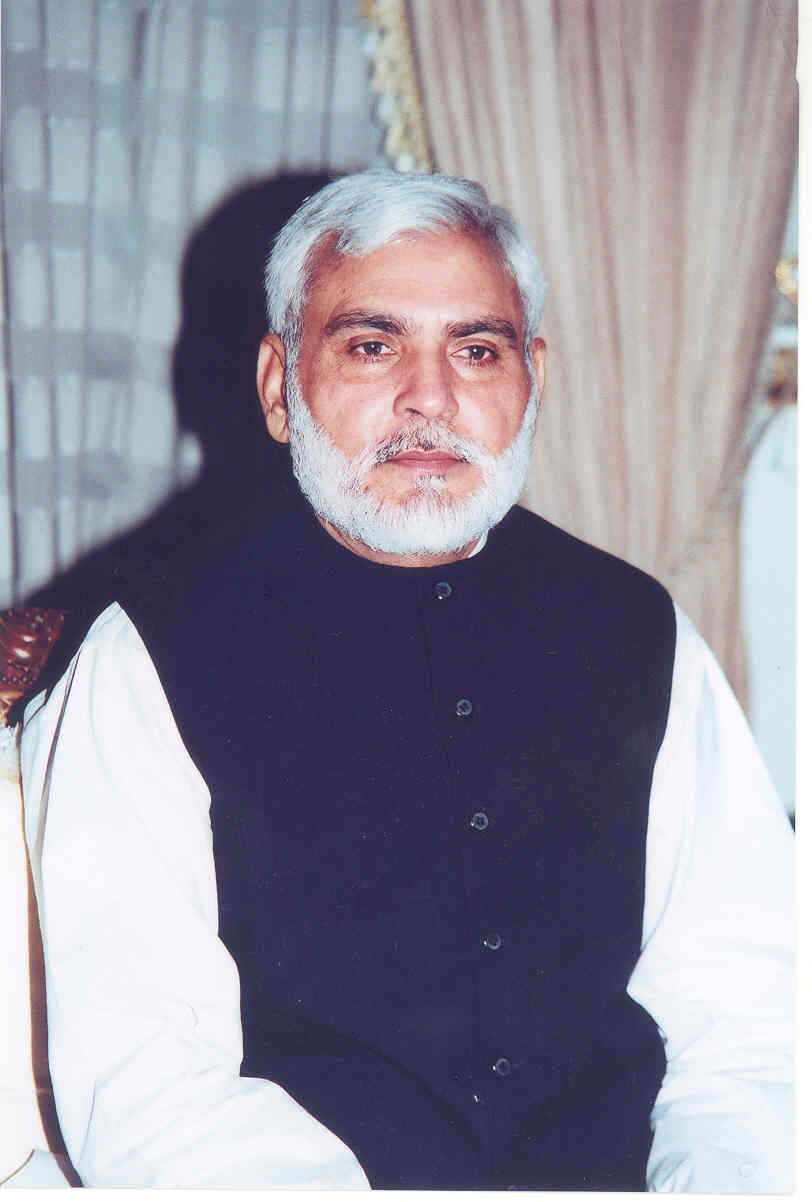

Speaker of the Provincial Assembly of Punjab
- In office 27 November 2002 – 11 April 2008
- Deputy: Shaukat Hussein Mazari
- Preceded by: Chaudhry Pervaiz Elahi
- Succeeded by: Rana Muhammad Iqbal Khan

Member of the Provincial Assembly of the Punjab
- In office 1 June 2013 – 31 May 2018
- Constituency: PP-52 (Faisalabad-II)
- In office 25 November 2002 – 17 November 2007
- Constituency: PP-51 (Faisalabad-I)

Personal details
- Born: 1 November 1945 (age 81) Sahianwala, Faisalabad District, Punjab
- Other political affiliations: PTI (2018-2023); PMLN (2013-2018); PML(Q) (2002-2013); PMLN (1993-2001); IJI (1988-1993); PML (1985-1988)
- Children: Ali Afzal Sahi (son); Junaid Afzal Sahi (son)
- Relatives: Ghulam Rasool Sahi (brother)
- Education: University of Punjab

Chaudhary Muhammad Afzal Sahi (born 1 November 1945) is a member of the Sahi Jat family in Faisalabad and is a Pakistani politician.

== Early life and education ==
Muhammad Afzal Sahi was born on 1 November 1949. He is the son of Chaudhry Nawab Khan Sahi, a famous landlord of Sahianwala. He got his early education from Government High School for Boys, Salarwala and then from Government College. He carried on with his education in Lahore and graduated from the University of the Punjab (Lahore) in 1971.

== Political career ==
After completing his education, Sahi stepped into politics in 1973.

=== District Government Faisalabad ===
He served as Member District Council Faisalabad for three consecutive terms from 1979 to 1991.

=== Provincial Assembly of Punjab ===
In 1985, he participated in the non-party basis Punjab Assembly elections, the first elections to be held during General Zia Ul-Haq's Martial Law regime. Although earlier results indicated that Sahi was defeated by 88 votes, the majority of the population was of the view that the elections were rigged. Mr. Sahi filed an election petition against these results which went in his favour. In February 1988, He was asked to take oath as member of the Provincial Assembly of the Punjab but the then government never allowed him to take oath until the assembly was dissolved on 30 May 1988.

He remained undefeated from his constituency from 1988 till 2008.

He served as a member of the Provincial Assembly of the Punjab in 1988–90, 1990–93, 1993–96, 1997–99, 2002-2007 and 2013–2018. He functioned as Parliamentary Secretary for Forestry, Fisheries and Wildlife during 1990-93 and as Minister for Communications & Works in Punjab during 1997–99. He was elected for the fifth consecutive term as a member of the Provincial Assembly of the Punjab in the 2002 Pakistani general election and was elected as the Speaker of Provincial Assembly of the Punjab.

He remained in this post from 2002 to 11 April 2008. During this period he also functioned as governor of Punjab several times.

His most recent term in the Provincial Assembly was from 29 May 2013 to 31 May 2018.

He ran for the seat of the Provincial Assembly from PP-98 Faisalabad-II as a candidate of the Pakistan Tehreek-e-Insaf (PTI) in the 2018 Punjab provincial election, but was unsuccessful. He received 44,933 votes and lost to Rana Shoaib Adrees Khan, a candidate of the Pakistan Muslim League (N).

After losing this election, Sahi announced his retirement from active politics.

== Family ==
Afzal Sahi's elder brother, Lt. Col. (Retd.) Ghulam Rasool Sahi, is also a veteran politician. He served as member of National Assembly from 2002 to 2007. He returned for his second term as member National Assembly of Pakistan from 2013 to 2018.

His nephew Zafar Zulqarnain Sahi served as member of Provincial Assembly of the Punjab, he was elected from PP-52 in the February 2008 elections. Sahi's younger brother, Akram Sahi is a (retired) major general of Pakistan Army. His son Ch Junaid Afzal Sahi was chairman UC 10 Faisalabad from 2015 to 2020.

Political offices
| Preceded by Khalid Maqbool | Governor of Punjab; Acting; 2002–2008 | Succeeded by Khalid Maqbool |
| Preceded by Chaudhry Pervaiz Elahi | Speaker of Punjab Assembly; 2002 – 2008 | Succeeded by Rana Muhammad Iqbal Khan |
| Preceded by Zulfiqar Ali Khosa | Minister for Communication and Works; 1997 – 1999 | Succeeded by Choudhry Zaheeruddin |
