= PP-203 Sahiwal-VI =

Constituency of the Punjabi Provincial Legislature, Pakistan

- Constituency for the Provincial Assembly of Punjab
- Region: Chichawatni Tehsil (partly) including Chichawatni city of Sahiwal District

Current constituency
- Created from: PP-225 Sahiwal-VI (2002-2018); PP-201 Sahiwal-VI (2018-2023)

PP-203 Sahiwal-VI (پی پی-203، ساہيوال-6) is a Constituency of Provincial Assembly of Punjab.

== By-election 2026 ==
A by-election was held on 8 November 2026 due to the death of Chaudhry Muhammad Hanif, the previous member from this seat. Muhammad Asad Hanif Jutt, his son, won the election with 42,114 votes.

By-election 2025: PP-203 Sahiwal-VI
Party	Candidate	Votes	%	±%
PML(N)	Muhammad Asad Hanif Jutt	42,114	59.73	▼21.13
Tehreek-i-Ehsaas Pakistan	Muhammad Awais Mahmood	24,512	34.76	N/A
Others	Others (five candidates)	3,883	5.51	
Turnout		71,230	27.60	▲5.19
Total valid votes		70,509	98.99	
Rejected ballots		721	1.01	
Majority		17,602	24.96	▼36.76
Registered electors		258,122		
PML(N) hold				

== By-election 2025 ==
A by-election will be held on 23 November 2025 due to the disqualification of Rai Muhammad Murtaza Iqbal, the previous member from this seat.

By-election 2025: PP-203 Sahiwal-VI
Party	Candidate	Votes	%	±%
PML(N)	Chaudhry Muhammad Hanif	45,073	80.86	
Independent	Falak Sher	10,670	19.14	
Turnout		56,873	22.41	
Total valid votes		55,743	98.01	
Rejected ballots		1,130	1.99	
Majority		34,403	61.72	
Registered electors		253,810		
PML(N) gain from Independent				

== General elections 2024 ==
Provincial elections were held on 8 February 2024.

Provincial election 2024: PP-203 Sahiwal-VI
Party	Candidate	Votes	%	±%
Independent	Rai Muhammad Murtaza Iqbal (Note: Filed nomination papers as PTI candidate but ECP allowed him to run as an Independent)	55,978	43.43	
PML(N)	Chaudhry Muhammad Hanif	35,509	27.55	
Independent	Zahid Iqbal	16,207	12.58	
TLP	Majid Hussain	12,884	10.00	
PPP	Waheed Husain	4,127	3.20	
Others	Others (thirteen candidates)	4,182	3.24	
Turnout		131,531	54.31	
Total valid votes		128,887	97.99	
Rejected ballots		2,644	2.01	
Majority		20,469	15.88	
Registered electors		242,156		
hold				

== By-election 2018 ==
A by-election was held on 14 October 2018 due to Rai Muhammad Murtaza Iqbal, the member-elect from this seat, vacating it in favor of NA-149 Sahiwal-III. Syed Samsam Bukhari won the election with 58,280 votes, defeating Chaudhry Muhammad Tufail.

== General elections 2018 ==
Provincial elections were held on 25 July 2018. Rai Muhammad Murtaza Iqbal won the election 66,551 votes.

Provincial election 2018: PP-201 Sahiwal-VI
Party	Candidate	Votes	%	±%
PTI	Rai Muhammad Murtaza Iqbal	66,551	51.72	
PML(N)	Chaudhry Muhammad Hanif	48,979	38.07	
PPP	Shafqat Ali Cheema	6,995	5.44	
TLP	Zia Ur Rehman Muhammad	2,964	2.30	
MMA	Ghulam Nabi Masoomi	1,595	1.24	
Others	Others (two candidates)	1,581	1.23	
Turnout		130,409	56.47	
Total valid votes		128,665	98.66	
Rejected ballots		1,744	1.34	
Majority		17,572	13.65	
Registered electors		230,951		

== General elections 2013 ==
Provincial elections were held on 11 May 2013. Chaudhry Muhammad Arshad Jutt won the election with 45,689 votes.

Provincial election 2013: PP-225 Sahiwal-VI
Party	Candidate	Votes	%	±%
PML(N)	Chaudhry Muhammad Arshad Jutt	45,689	44.82	
PTI	Rai Muhammad Murtaza Iqbal	36,017	35.33	
PML(Q)	Muhammad Javed Sohail	16,796	16.48	
PPP	Choudahry Shafqat Ali Cheema	2,591	2.54	
Others	Others (seven candidates)	850	0.83	
Turnout		104,591	61.91	
Total valid votes		101,943	97.47	
Rejected ballots		2,648	2.53	
Majority		9,672	9.49	
Registered electors		168,938		

== General elections 2008 ==
Contesting candidates	Party affiliation	Votes polled

== See also ==
- PP-202 Sahiwal-V
- PP-204 Sahiwal-VII
