= Tariq Mahmood Bajwa =

Pakistani politician

Member of the National Assembly of Pakistan
- In office 2008–2013
- Constituency: NA-75 (Faisalabad-I)

Tariq Mahmood Bajwa is a Pakistani politician who had been a member of the National Assembly of Pakistan from 2008 to 2013.

== Political career ==
He was elected to the National Assembly of Pakistan from Constituency NA-75 (Faisalabad-I) as a candidate of Pakistan Peoples Party (PPP) in the 2008 Pakistani general election. He received 83,699 votes and defeated Ghulam Rasool Sahi, a candidate of Pakistan Muslim League (Q) (PML-Q).

In the same election, he ran for the seat of the Provincial Assembly of the Punjab as an independent candidate from Constituency PP-51 (Faisalabad-I) but was unsuccessful. He received 92 votes and lost the seat to Haji Liaqat Ali, a candidate of PPP.

He ran for the seat of the National Assembly from Constituency NA-75 (Faisalabad-I) as a candidate of PPP in the 2013 Pakistani general election but was unsuccessful. He received 9,916 votes and lost the seat to Ghulam Rasool Sahi.

He ran for the seat of the National Assembly from Constituency NA-100 (Faisalabad-I) as a candidate of PPP in the 2018 Pakistani general election but was unsuccessful. He received 29,755 votes and lost the seat to Chaudhry Asim Nazir.
