= Rana Shoaib Adrees Khan =

Pakistani politician

Member of the Provincial Assembly of the Punjab
- In office 15 August 2018 – 14 January 2023
- Constituency: PP-98 Faisalabad-II
- In office 29 May 2013 – 31 May 2018
- Constituency: PP-55 Faisalabad-V

Personal details
- Born: 1 January 1980 (age 46) Faisalabad, Punjab, Pakistan
- Party: PMLN

Rana Shoaib Adrees Khan is a Pakistani politician who was a Member of the Provincial Assembly of the Punjab, from May 2013 to May 2018 and from August 2018 to January 2023.

== Early life ==
He was born on 1 January 1980.

== Political career ==
He was elected to the Provincial Assembly of the Punjab as a candidate of Pakistan Muslim League (Nawaz) (PML-N) from PP-55 Faisalabad-V in the 2013 Punjab provincial election. He defeated Chaudhry Zaheer Ud Din of PML-Q by a heavy margin.

He was re-elected to Provincial Assembly of the Punjab as a candidate of PML-N from PP-98 Faisalabad-II in the 2018 Punjab provincial election. He defeated Muhammad Afzal Sahi of PTI by a heavy margin.

He again contested for the Provincial Assembly of the Punjab as a candidate of Pakistan Muslim League (N) from Constituency PP-99 Faisalabad-II in the 2024 Pakistani general election. He lost the election by obtaining 15,309 votes. He was defeated by Ahmad Mujtaba Chaudhry of Pakistan Tehreek-e-Insaf by a heavy margin of 35,309 Votes.
