= Chaudhry Umair Wasi Zafar =

Pakistani politician

Chaudhry Umair Wasi Zafar is a Pakistani politician.

== Political career ==
He was elected to the Provincial Assembly of the Punjab as a Pakistan Tehreek-e-Insaf-backed independent candidate from Constituency PP-100 Faisalabad-III in the 2024 Pakistani general election. He received 48,298 votes and defeated PML-N candidate Sardar Khan Bahadur Dogar who received 44,433 votes. However, in an election recount, his opponent, Khan Bahadur, was declared the winner.
