= Muhammad Munir Azhar =

Pakistani politician (born 1941)

- محمد منیر اظہر

Member of the National Assembly of Pakistan
- In office 1 June 2013 – 31 May 2018
- Constituency: NA-163 (Sahiwal-IV)

Member of the Provincial Assembly of Punjab
- In office 12 March 1993 – 10 October 1996
- Constituency: PP-185 Chichawatni Sahiwal

Personal details
- Born: 1 October 1941 Kapurthala India
- Died: 12 October 2026 (aged 85) Chichawatni Sahiwal Pakistan
- Party: Pakistan Muslim League (N) (2008-2026)
- Other political affiliations: Pakistan Muslim League-Q (2001-2008); Pakistan Peoples Party (1988-2001)

Chaudhry Muhammad Munir Azhar (Urdu: چوہدری محمد منیر اظہر; 1 October 1941 - 12 October 2026) was a Pakistani politician who had been a member of the National Assembly of Pakistan, from June 2013 to May 2018. Previously he was a member of Provincial Assembly of Punjab from 1993 to 1996.

== Early life ==
He was born on 1 October 1941. He is currently living in his hometown in Chichawatni, Sahiwal.

== Political career ==
He ran for the seat of the Provincial Assembly of the Punjab as a candidate of Pakistan Peoples Party from PP-185 Chichawatni Sahiwal in the 1993 Pakistani general election and defeated Rai Hassan Nawaz of PML-N. He received 32,244 votes and won with a margin of 15300 votes.

He ran for the seat of the Provincial Assembly of the Punjab as a candidate of Pakistan Peoples Party from PP-185 Chichawatni Sahiwal in the 1997 Pakistani general election but was unsuccessful. He received 23,545 votes and lost the seat to Rai Hassan Nawaz of PML-N.

He ran for the seat of the Provincial Assembly of the Punjab as a candidate of Pakistan Muslim League (Q) (PML-Q) from Constituency PP-225 (Sahiwal-VI) in the 2002 Pakistani general election but was unsuccessful. He received 32,244 votes and lost the seat to Chaudhry Muhammad Arshad Jutt.

He ran for the seat of the National Assembly of Pakistan as a candidate of Pakistan Muslim League (N) (PML-N) from Constituency NA-163 (Sahiwal-IV) in the 2008 Pakistani general election but was unsuccessful. He received 34,644 votes and lost to Malik Nauman Ahmad Langrial, a candidate of PML-Q.

He was elected to the National Assembly as a candidate of PML-N from Constituency NA-163 (Sahiwal-IV) in the 2013 Pakistani general election. He received 89,126 votes and defeated Malik Nauman Ahmad Langrial, a candidate of PML-Q.

== Death ==
He died on 12 October 2026, aged 85.
