= Chak 190 RB Karari Kalan =

Karrari Kalan کراڑی کلاں
- Developed Village
- Location within Pakistan
- Coordinates: 31°32′36.443″N 73°9′25.515″E
- Country: Pakistan
- District: Faisalabad
- Province: Punjab
- Tehsil: Faisalabad Saddar
- Postal Code: 37701
- Elevation: 186.5 m (612 ft)
- Time zone: UTC+5

Chak No 190 RB Karrari Kalan (in Urdu: کراڑی کلاں) is a village in Faisalabad District, in the Punjab province of Pakistan. The village in about 21 km from Faisalabad, the third most populous city in Pakistan. It is at a distance of 5.5 km from Chak Jhumra, a tehsil of Faisalabad. In its east there is Karrari Khurd, Rarra Tahli in west, Jandawala in south and Chak Jhumra is on its north. It has two government schools. One is a boys middle school and other is a girls high school. There are also some private schools, some madrassas, a computer learning school and a cloths embroidery learning school in the village. These schools have produced much talent which is serving the nation in different areas like the Pakistan Army, Pakistan Atomic Energy Commission, KRL, medical, agriculture, education department, WAPDA, Punjab Police, banks, Pakistan Civil Aviation Authority, and various other departments. This village has a higher literacy rate than the surrounding villages. The village has five mosques. People here are very friendly.

The village has the facilities like distilled water, electricity, landline phone, cable TV and domestic gas. The sanitary system is also satisfactory. The village is at ideal location situated in lush green fields on the Faisalabad-Chak Jhumra road, adjacent to M4 motorway and near Khurrianwala-Sargodha road by-pass. Railway line also passes through the village.

== Problems ==
The major problem of the village is health facilities. There are few private clinics of some diploma holder "doctors" which can treat some basic diseases. People have to move to Faisalabad or Chak Jhumra to get their patient treated. Due to which some persons lost their lives on the way to hospital. The other problem is a soap factory which is situated in the village. This factory emits blackish, dense and bad smelling fumes which are causing the breath diseases among the villagers. The open big channel to dispose the sanitary water is also causing the diseases like malaria. It needs to be covered. Another problem is the absence of railway barrier at railway line whose absence has put the life of villagers in danger. The main ways to the village become unsafe at night. It becomes dangerous to travel to village at night due to which people doing jobs in remote cities face much trouble. Many incidents of looting the people on the way to village happened. So some police patrolling needed on these ways especially at night due this security risk. If government pays proper attention to the basics facilities of these villagers, it will be a relief for them and they will prove more useful citizens.
