= Muhammad Ajmal Cheema =

Pakistani politician (born 1960)

Provincial Minister of Punjab for Bait-ul-Mal and Social Welfare
- In office 13 September 2018 – 19 July 2019

Member of the Provincial Assembly of the Punjab
- In office 15 August 2018 – 21 May 2022
- Constituency: PP-97 Faisalabad-I

Personal details
- Born: 13 January 1960 (age 66) Faisalabad, Punjab, Pakistan
- Party: TLP (2025–present)
- Other political affiliations: IPP (2023–2025); PMLN (2021–2023); IND (2018–2021); PTI (2013–2018)

Muhammad Ajmal Cheema (born 13 January 1960) is a Pakistani politician who was the Provincial Minister of Punjab for Bait-ul-Mal and Social Welfare, in office from 13 September 2018 to 19 July 2019. He was a member of the Provincial Assembly of the Punjab since August 2018 to May 2022. He is a well-known personality in chak jhumra.

== Education ==
Muhammad Ajmal Cheema is an alumnus of the University of the Punjab.

== Political career ==
Ajmal political career progressed from local government to a national politics. He began his Political career as the Nazim, union council No. 7 serving two consecutive terms from 2001 to 2010 Punjab Assembly . During this period, he also served as a member of Punjab Safety commission from 2005 to 2010 Punjab Safe Cities Authority . Later, he joined Pakistan Tehreek-e-Insaf (PTI) in 2013. He contested the 2013 Pakistani general election as a PTI candidate from PP-51 Faisalabad-I, but was defeated by Azad Ali Tabassum of Pakistan Muslim League (N) (PML(N)).

He elected as a member of Provincial Assembly of the Punjab as an independent candidate from PP-97 Faisalabad-I Chak Jhumra in 2018 Punjab provincial election. He received 42,405 votes and defeated Ali Afzal Sahi, a candidate of the PTI.

He joined the PTI after won the election.

On 12 September 2018, he was inducted into the provincial Punjab cabinet of Chief Minister Sardar Usman Buzdar. On 13 September 2018, he was appointed as Provincial Minister of Punjab for Bait-ul-Mal and Social Welfare.

He was removed from the charge of provincial minister of Punjab for Baitul Maal and Social Welfare on 19 July 2019.

He was being accused of adultery/supported in adultery of the same Baitul Maal and Social Welfare underage girls he was custodian of.

On 21 May 2022, was de-seated due to vote against party policy for the Chief Minister of Punjab election on 16 April 2022.

He ran as a candidate of the PML(N) in the subsequent by-election of July 2022, but was unsuccessful. He received 54,266 votes and was defeated by Ali Afzal Sahi, a candidate of the PTI.

He ran as a candidate of the Istehkam-e-Pakistan Party in the 2024 Pakistani general election from PP-98 Faisalabad-I, but was unsuccessful again for the 3rd time. He received 25,266 votes and was defeated by Junaid Afzal Sahi, a candidate of the PTI.

After the denotification of Junaid Afzal Sahi the 2025 Pakistani by-elections was held at constituency of PP-98 Faisalabad-I Chak Jhumra, at that moment the competition were in between Azad Ali Tabassum and Ajmal Cheema. Ajmal contested the election as an independent candidate, and his opponent contest the election on the party ticket of Pakistan Muslim League (N). Azad won the election by taken 44,674 votes and Ajmal took 35,365 votes PP-98 By-Election
