= Chak 110/7R =

Chak 110/7R Ohddan Wala 110/7-R اوڈاں والا
- Village
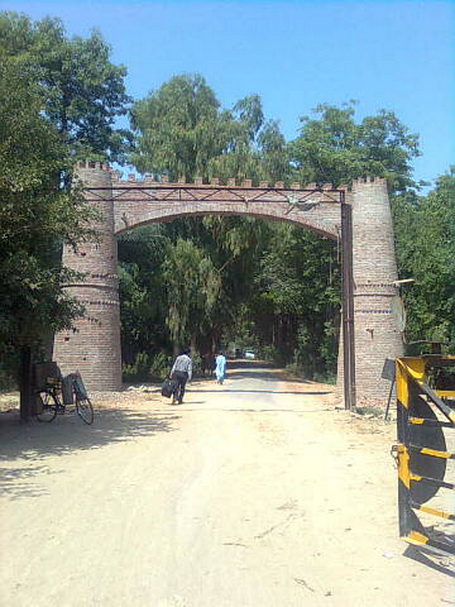
- Pakistan: Pakistan
- Province: Punjab
- District: Sahiwal
- Elevation: 152.4 m (500 ft)

Population (2022)
  - Total: 16,800
- Time zone: UTC+5 (PST)
- Area code: 040

Chak No.110/7R is a village situated in union council 48 Chichawatni, Sahiwal District, Punjab, Pakistan. Related villages include Chak No 109/7R Bhattinagar and Chak No 111/7R.

== See also ==
- Chichawatni
- Harappa
- Sahiwal
