= Muhammad Asim Nazir =

Pakistani politician (born 1970)

- محمد عاصم نذیر

Member of the National Assembly of Pakistan
- In office 13 August 2018 – 10 August 2023
- Constituency: NA-101 (Faisalabad-I)
- In office 10 October 2002 – 31 May 2018
- Constituency: NA-77 (Faisalabad-III)

Personal details
- Born: 20 November 1970 (age 55)
- Party: IPP (2023-present)
- Other political affiliations: PMLN (2022-2023); PTI (2018-2022); PMLN (2012-2018); PML(Q) (2002-2012)

Muhammad Asim Nazir (Urdu: محمد عاصم نذیر; born 20 November 1970) is a Pakistani politician who had been a member of the National Assembly of Pakistan from August 2018 till August 2023. Previously he was a member of the National Assembly from 2002 to May 2018.

== Early life ==
He was born on 20 November 1970 in a Famous Political family of Faisalabad. He is son of former member of national assembly Nazir Ahmad.

== Political career ==
He was elected to the National Assembly of Pakistan as a candidate of Pakistan Muslim League (Q) (PML-Q) from Constituency NA-77 (Faisalabad-III) in the 2002 Pakistani general election. He received 63,296 votes and defeated Muhammad Akram Chaudhary, a candidate of Pakistan Muslim League (N) (PML-N).

He was re-elected to the National Assembly as a candidate of PML-Q from Constituency NA-77 (Faisalabad-III) in the 2008 Pakistani general election. He received 63,776 votes and defeated Muhammad Tallal Chaudry.

He was re-elected to the National Assembly as a candidate of PML-N from Constituency NA-77 (Faisalabad-III) in the 2013 Pakistani general election. He received 98,057 votes and defeated Chaudhry Zaheer Ud Din, a candidate of Pakistan Muslim League-Q.

He was re-elected to the National Assembly as an independent candidate from Constituency NA-101 (Faisalabad-I) in the 2018 Pakistani general election. He obtained 147,355 Votes and defeated Zafar Zuqurnain Sahi of Pakistan Tehreek-e-Insaf by a heavy margin of 80,785 Votes. Following his successful election, he announced to join Pakistan Tehreek-e-Insaf (PTI) in August 2018.

== Electoral history ==
=== 2018 ===
General election 2018: NA-101 (Faisalabad-I)
Party	Candidate	Votes	%
Independent	Muhammad Asim Nazir	147,812	55.31
PTI	Zafar Zulqarnain Sahi	86,575	32.39
Others	Others (twelve candidates)	26,457	9.90
