= Malikpur, Faisalabad =

Malikpur
- Village
- Country: Pakistan
- Province: Punjab
- District: Faisalabad
- Time zone: UTC+5 (PST)

Malikpur is a village in Faisalabad District, in Pakistan's Punjab province. The official name of the village is 203 RB Malikpur. Malikpur is one of the most developed villages in Faisalabad. Residence of Zahid mahmood PTI candidate for National Assembly.

Aadil mahmood the emerging youth politician also resides in Malikpur.

The neighbouring areas of Mailkpur are Nishatabad, Manawala and Amin Town.

== See also ==
- Nishatabad
- Bhaiwala
