= 2025 Pakistani by-elections =

By-Elections in Pakistan (November 2025)

- 23 November 2025

6 seats in the National Assembly 7 seats in the Provincial Assembly of Punjab
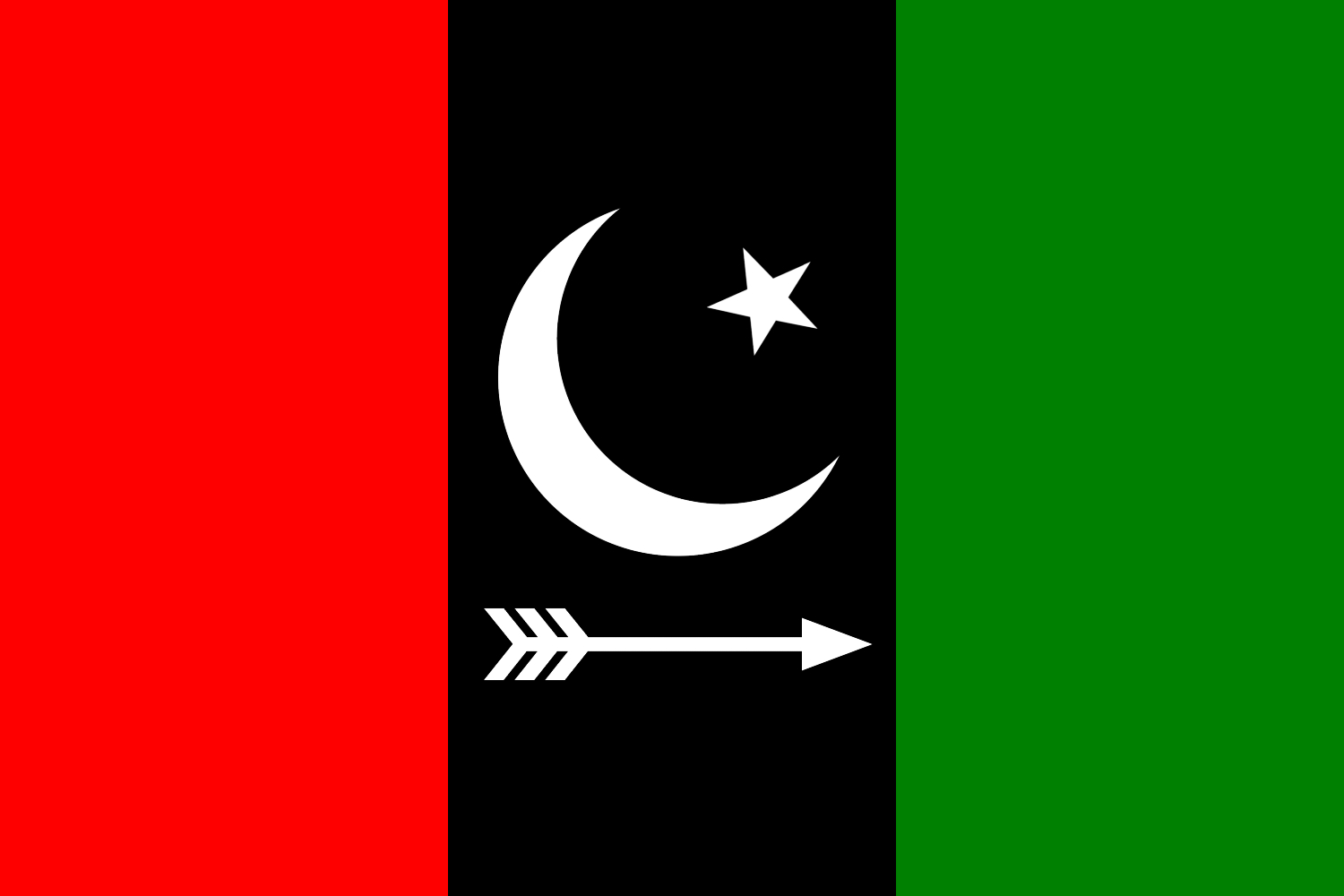

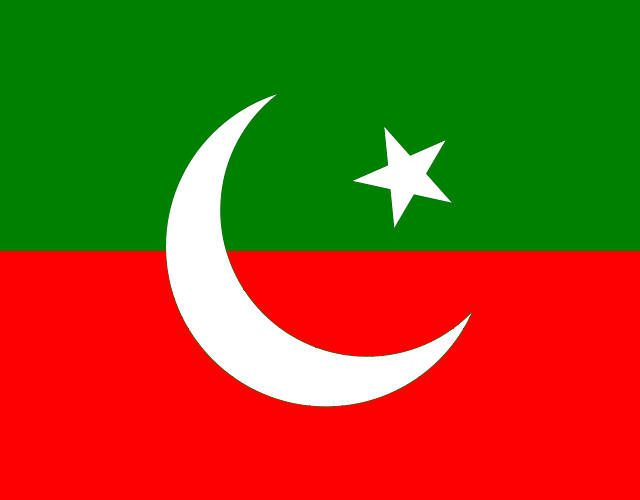
	First party	Second party	Third party
Leader	Shehbaz Sharif	Bilawal Bhutto Zardari	Imran Khan
Party	PML(N)	PPP	PTI
Seats won	11	1	1

The 2025 Pakistani by-elections were held on 23 November 2025 to fill six vacant seats in the National Assembly of Pakistan and seven vacant seats in the Provincial Assembly of Punjab. The by-elections were triggered primarily by the disqualification of lawmakers from the Pakistan Tehreek-e-Insaf (PTI) party following their convictions related to the May 2023 riots.

Polling took place amid heightened security, with over 20,000 police personnel deployed across the constituencies. The Election Commission of Pakistan (ECP) established control rooms in Islamabad and Lahore to monitor the process, which involved 408 polling stations. Voter turnout was reported as low in some areas, attributed to security concerns and other factors. According to unofficial results, the ruling Pakistan Muslim League (N) (PML-N) won 12 of the 13 seats, with PTI securing one.

== Background ==
The vacancies arose mainly from the disqualification of PTI-affiliated members of the National Assembly and Punjab Assembly. These disqualifications stemmed from court convictions for involvement in the violent protests on 9 May 2023, following the arrest of PTI leader Imran Khan. The ECP announced the by-election schedule in October 2025, setting the polling date for 23 November.

The constituencies included one in Khyber Pakhtunkhwa (NA-18 Haripur) and the remainder in Punjab. PTI alleged irregularities in the process, including issues with Form 45 vote tally sheets, but the ECP maintained that the elections were conducted fairly.

== Constituencies ==
The by-elections covered the following seats:

=== National Assembly ===
- NA-18 Haripur
- NA-96 Faisalabad-II
- NA-104 Faisalabad-X
- NA-129 Lahore-XIII
- NA-143 Sahiwal-III
- NA-185 Dera Ghazi Khan-II

=== Punjab Assembly ===
- PP-73 Sargodha-III
- PP-87 Mianwali-III
- PP-98 Faisalabad-I
- PP-115 Faisalabad-XVIII
- PP-116 Faisalabad-XIX
- PP-203 Sahiwal-VI
- PP-269 Muzaffargarh-II

== Results ==
According to unofficial results, PML-N secured victories in 12 constituencies. While PTI won one seat. Official results still pending confirmation by the ECP.
