= Ali Afzal Sahi =

Pakistani politician

Member of the National Assembly of Pakistan
- Incumbent
- Assumed office 29 February 2024
- Constituency: NA-95 Faisalabad-I

Minister for Communications and Works, Punjab
- In office 7 August 2022 – 14 January 2023
- Governor: Muhammad Baligh Ur Rehman
- Chief Minister: Chaudhry Pervaiz Elahi

Member of the Provincial Assembly of the Punjab
- In office 18 July 2022 – 14 January 2023
- Preceded by: Muhammad Ajmal Cheema
- Constituency: PP-97 Faisalabad-I

Personal details
- Party: PTI (2018-present)
- Relations: Junaid Afzal Sahi (brother); Ghulam Rasool Sahi (uncle)
- Parent: Muhammad Afzal Sahi (father)

Chaudhry Ali Afzal Sahi is a Pakistani politician and lawyer who is currently serving as a Member of the National Assembly of Pakistan constituency of NA-95 since 29 February 2024. Previously, he served as the Provincial Minister of Punjab for Communication and Works from August 2022 till January 2023. He also served as a member of the Provincial Assembly of the Punjab from July 2022 till January 2023. Ali Afzal Sahi family has belongings with party Pakistan Tehreek-e-Insaf.

== Early life and education ==
Ali belongs to a politically active Punjabi Jutt family of the Sahi clan from Faisalabad, as his father Muhammad Afzal Sahi, his brother Junaid Afzal Sahi, his uncle Lt. Col. (R) Ghulam Rasool Sahi and his cousin Zafar Zulqarnain Sahi have all been parliamentarians. Their family serving in Pakistan politician and in department of Pakistan army. Ali father Muhammad Afzal Sahi served as the speaker of Provincial Assembly of the Punjab from 2002 to 2008.

He has memorized the Qur'an and earned his Bachelor's and later his LLB from the Lahore University of Management Sciences (LUMS).

== Political career ==
He contested the 2018 Punjab provincial election from PP-97 Faisalabad-I as a candidate of Pakistan Tehreek-e-Insaf (PTI), but was unsuccessful. He received 37,973 votes and lost to Muhammad Ajmal Cheema, an independent candidate.

He was elected to the Provincial Assembly of the Punjab from PP-97 Faisalabad-I as a candidate of the PTI in the July 2022 Punjab provincial by-election. He received 67,022 votes and defeated Muhammad Ajmal Cheema, a candidate of the Pakistan Muslim League (N) (PML(N)).

He was elected to National Assembly of Pakistan in the 2024 Pakistani general election, as a PTI-backed independent candidate from NA-95 Faisalabad-I. He received 144,229 votes and defeated Azad Ali Tabassum, a candidate of PML(N).

He took the oath on 29 February 2024.

== Writings ==
He has written articles and op-eds for different publications, including for the English-language Daily Times.
