= Faisalabad–Shahkot–Sheikhupura Road =

Road in Pakistan

Faisalabad–Shahkot–Sheikhupura Road فیصل آباد – شاہ کوٹ - شَيخُوپُورہ سڑک
- Sheikhupura Road

Route information
- Maintained by Punjab Highway Department
- Length: 95 km (59 mi)

Major junctions
- From: Millat Chowk, Faisalabad
- Gatwala Chowk (Faisalabad Canal Expressway); Khurrianwala; Shahkot; Mananwala
- To: Bhatti Chowk, Sheikhupura

Location
- Country: Pakistan

Highway system
- Roads in Pakistan

The Faisalabad–Shahkot–Sheikhupura Road (Punjabi, Urdu: فیصل آباد – شاہ کوٹ - شَيخُوپُورہ سڑک), also known locally as Sheikhupura Road is a provincially maintained road in Punjab province of Pakistan that extends from Faisalabad to Sheikhupura via Shahkot.

== Features ==
- Distance between Faisalabad - Shahkot = 43 km (27 mi)
- Distance between Shahkot - Sheikhupura = 52 km (32 mi)
- Total distance = 95 km
- Lanes = 6
- Speed limit = 80 km/h for heavy transport vehicles and 120 km/h for light transport vehicles
