= Peerwana =

- Village
- Location in Pakistan
- Coordinates: 31°44′35″N 73°12′55″E
- Country: Pakistan
- Province: Punjab
- District: Faisalabad
- Time zone: UTC+5 (PST)

Peerwana is a village in Faisalabad District near Chak Jhumra, in central Punjab, Pakistan. The village is part of Chak Jhumra town's union council#2. It is situated on the M3 (Faisalabad-Pindi Bhattian) motorway near Sahianwala Interchange. It is one of the newly built motorways of Pakistan which connects Islamabad and Lahore to Faisalabad. Many people from nearby villages use the M3 to travel to Lahore, Islamabad, Peshawar and Multan. The village is 140 kilometers from Lahore and 30 kilometers from Faisalabad. It was named after Peer Sahab, a prominent saint.
