= Talwandi Rai =

Talwandi Rai Jagdev Singh Talwandi
- village
- Nickname: Talwandi
- Location in Punjab, India Talwandi Rai (India)
- Coordinates: 30.70°N 75.57°E
- Country: India
- State: Punjab
- District: Ludhiana district

Languages
  - Official: Punjabi
- Time zone: UTC+5:30 (IST)
- Telephone code: 91-1624
- Nearest city: Jagraon, Raikot

Talwandi Rai is a village in Ludhiana district in the India of Punjab. It is 37 km from Ludhiana city, near Raikot.

== History ==
Talwandi Rai was reputedly founded in 1478 AD by the Rai Kalha I who was a Muslim Rajput. The village was autonomous during most of the British rule in India and was ruled by a Rajput King up until the late 1800s when the British Raj demanded the Rai adhere to British demands. In return Muslim rule was maintained until the partition in 1947. The descendants of the last pre-partition ruler of Talwandi Rai can be found in Pakistan.

== Now ==
Talwandi Rai, finished construction on the Ganga Sagar Gurdwara. The temple has been fitted with lights that run across the whole building, visible for miles.

== See also ==
- Jagraon
- Mullanpur Dakha
