= Faisalabad Canal Expressway =

Road in Faisalabad, Pakistan

Route information
- Maintained by Highway Division, CDGF
- Length: 25 km (16 mi)
- Existed: 2016–present

Major junctions
- From: Sahianwala Interchange
- To: Gatwala Chowk

Location
- Country: Pakistan

Highway system
- Roads in Pakistan

The Faisalabad Canal Expressway (Urdu: فیصل آباد نہر گزرگاہ) is a 27-km city district expressway located in Faisalabad, Punjab, Pakistan.

In July 2015, Rana Sanaullah, Punjab Law Minister told news reporters in Faisalabad that the new 25-kilometre Faisalabad Canal Expressway would offer signal-free travel from Sahianwala to Samundari.

== See also ==
- Roads in Pakistan
