= Malik Nawab Sher Waseer =

Pakistani politician

Member of the National Assembly of Pakistan
- In office 13 August 2018 – 10 August 2023
- Constituency: NA-102 (Faisalabad-II)
- In office 2008–2013
- Constituency: NA-76 (Faisalabad-II)

Personal details
- Born: 26 July 1945 (age 81) Faisalabad, Punjab, Pakistan
- Party: PMLN (2024-present)
- Other political affiliations: IPP (2023-2024); PMLN (2022-2023); PTI (2018-2022); PMLN (2013-2018); PPP (1993-1996); PML-Q (2001-2008); PMLN (1997-1999); PPP (1993-1996); PMLN (1990-1993); PPP (1988-1990); PML (1985-1988)

Malik Nawab Sher Waseer WAS (born 26 July 1945) in Chack No 633 GB Riaz NAGAR is a Pakistani politician who had been a member of the National Assembly of Pakistan from August 2018 till August 2023. Previously he was a member of the National Assembly from 2008 to 2013.

== Political career ==
He was elected to the National Assembly of Pakistan from Constituency NA-76 (Faisalabad-II) as a candidate of Pakistan Peoples Party (PPP) in the 2008 Pakistani general election. He received 43,294 votes and defeated Zahid Nazir, a candidate of Pakistan Muslim League (Q) (PML-Q).

He ran for the seat of the National Assembly from Constituency NA-76 (Faisalabad-II) as a candidate of PPP in the 2013 Pakistani general election but was unsuccessful. He received 35,750 votes and lost the seat to Muhammad Tallal Chaudry. In the same election, he ran for the seat of the Provincial Assembly of the Punjab as an independent candidate from Constituency PP-53 (Faisalabad-III) but was unsuccessful. He received 174 votes and lost the seat to Iffat Miraj Awan.

He was re-elected to the National Assembly as a candidate of Pakistan Tehreek-e-Insaf (PTI) from Constituency NA-102 (Faisalabad-II) in the 2018 Pakistani general election. He did not follow the party line in his vote on the no confidence motion against Imran Khan in March 2022.

== Electoral history ==
=== 2018 ===
General election 2018: NA-102 (Faisalabad-II)
Party	Candidate	Votes	%
PTI	Malik Nawab Sher Waseer	109,708	40.20
PML(N)	Talal Chaudhry	97,869	35.86
PPP	Shahjhan Khan	19,557	7.33
Others	Others (thirteen candidates)	39,058	14.66
