= Faisalabad–Jhang Road =

Road in Pakistan

Faisalabad-Jhang Road فیصل آباد – جھنگ سڑک

Route information
- Maintained by Punjab Highway Department
- Length: 80 km (50 mi)

Major junctions
- From: Bus Terminal, Faisalabad; Painsra
- To: Bus Terminal, Jhang

Location
- Country: Pakistan

Highway system
- Roads in Pakistan

Faisalabad–Jhang Road (Punjabi, Urdu: فیصل آباد – جھنگ سڑک), also known locally as Jhang Road, is a provincially maintained road in Punjab, Pakistan that connects Faisalabad and Jhang.

== Salient features ==
Length: 80 km

Lanes: 4 lanes

Speed limit: Universal minimum speed limit of 40 km/h and a maximum speed limit of 80 km/h for heavy transport vehicles and 100 km/h for light transport vehicles.
