= Salarwala =

Town in Punjab, Pakistan

Coordinates: 31°40′15.19″N 73°17′8.66″E

Salarwala (Urdu: سالاروالا) is located in Faisalabad District, Punjab, Pakistan. It is a town situated on the Faisalabad to Lahore railway section. It has been one of the oldest railway stations before the independence of Pakistan in 1947. Many people have used it as a starting point for railway journeys all over South Asia. It is 60 miles from Lahore and 20 miles from Faisalabad.

It was named after Salar Singh, although some refer to it as Dar-ul-Ehsan, a name given to it by erudite Sufi saint Muhammad Barkat Ali, or as he is commonly known, Babaji Sarkar.

Nearby towns are Sangla Hill and Chak Jhumra. By road, Salarwala is connected to Shahkot, Sangla Hill and Chak Jhumra.

The most famous thing in Salarwala is its Government High School for Boys. This school has produced many notable personalities such as Chaudhry Muhammad Afzal Sahi of Chak Jhumra, ex speaker in Provincial Assembly of the Punjab. Salarwala was also home to the aforementioned Babaji Sarkar (Sufi Barkat Ali), who later migrated to Dalowal Samundri. Nawaz Sharif, a former prime minister of Pakistan, was a famous follower of Babaji Sarkar and used to visit Salarwala.

A popular politician who represented this constituency was Muhammad Saleem bajwa, who was elected as a member of the Provincial Assembly in 1985. This was a time when the economic condition of the region was not very good and a progressive approach was needed. He put his efforts into changing the fate of the region and managed to achieve those goals.

Dr. Syed Abrar Shah Gillani, former Dean of Animal Husbandry in agriculture university of Faisalabad is also a famous religious and scientific scholar living in nearby village 132 R.B Sahuwala. Dr. Raza Hussain, PhD (France), Post Doctorate (Canada), a notable food scientist, also belongs to the same village (132/R.B) and had completed his secondary education from government high school salarwala.

The town has a multi-ethnic population of ten thousand. Much of this population is uneducated. Conditions of civil amenities are poor. A government hospital exists which was established in the time of united India. It has shifted to a new building and its old land has been occupied by land mafia.

Probably the biggest feature of Salarwala is its game of shooting volleyball. As the legend goes this game has been played for 60 or so years. Some outstanding shoot strikers of Punjab were produced in Salarwala. The game is played in front of the railway station and can be seen morning and evening. Every spring there is a tournament in which teams from all over Punjab participate.

Now Salarwala is a town and there are many shops in it. An Allied Bank branch has also opened in it.

GHS Salarwala was established in 1900 and in 1935 this school became a middle school.

== Economy ==
The economy is meager and agricultural in nature. Many people are employed in industrial operations and travel daily to Faisalabad.

== See also ==
- Peerwana 43/JB
- Rakh Branch
- Chak Jhumra
- Jaranwala
- Sangla Hill
- Shahkot (Pakistan)
- Chatha
- 139 Rb Ghammi
- Faisalabad
