= Faisalabad Dry Port =

Faisalabad Dry Port خشک بندرگاہ فیصل آباد
- Click on the map for a fullscreen view

Location
- Country: Pakistan
- Location: Faisalabad Dryport Trust, Faisalabad-Jhumra Road, Faisalabad, Punjab, Pakistan
- Coordinates: 31.4904°N 73.1410°E

Details
- Opened: 1996
- Owned by: Government of Pakistan
- Type of harbour: Dry port
- Size of harbour: Inland
- Authority: Faisalabad Dryport Trust
- Services: Cargo, Logistics and Storage

Statistics
- Phone: +92-41-9230204
- Website https://faisalabaddryport.com/

Faisalabad Dry Port (Urdu: خشک بندرگاہ فیصل آباد) is a dry port in Faisalabad, Pakistan. It is managed by the Faisalabad Dryport Trust. It works in cooperation with DP World, which provides rail freight transport from the dry-port. The rail track extents to Port Qasim, Karachi.

== History ==
The dryport was founded in 1996. The city's booming textile industry saw huge growth in exports of textiles, yarns, fibres, clothing and apparel products. The dryport was incorporated into the existing rail network and linked to the seaport of Port Qasim, Karachi.
