= NA-96 Faisalabad-II =

Constituency of the National Assembly of Pakistan

- Constituency for the National Assembly of Pakistan
- Region: Jaranwala Tehsil (partly) including Jaranwala city of Faisalabad District
- Electorate: 562,891

Current constituency
- Member: Vacant
- Created from: NA-96 Faisalabad-II

NA-96 Faisalabad-II (این اے-96، فیصل آباد-۲) is a constituency for the National Assembly of Pakistan.

== Members of Parliament ==
=== 2018–2023: NA-102 Faisalabad-II ===
Election	Member	Party
2018	Malik Nawab Sher Waseer	PTI

=== 2024–2025: NA-96 Faisalabad-II ===
Election	Member	Party
2024	Rai Haider Ali Khan	PTI

== Election 2002 ==
General elections were held on 10 October 2002. Muhammad Wasi Zafar of PML-Q won by 56,089 votes.

General election 2002: NA-76 Faisalabad-II
Party	Candidate	Votes	%	±%
PML(Q)	Ch. Muhammad Wasi Zafar	56,089	43.96	
PML(N)	Rai Salah-Ud-Din Khan	41,119	32.22	
PPP	Rai Ejaz Hussain	19,521	15.30	
MMA	Abu Bakr Hamza	9,567	7.50	
Independent	Rai Fiaz Hussain	1,307	1.02	
Turnout		130,606	44.83	
Total valid votes		127,603	97.70	
Rejected ballots		3,003	2.30	
Majority		14,970	11.74	
Registered electors		291,363		

== Election 2008 ==
The result of general election 2008 in this constituency is given below.

=== Result ===
Malik Nawab Sher Waseer succeeded in the election 2008 and became the member of National Assembly.

General election 2008: NA-76 Faisalabad-II
Party	Candidate	Votes	%	±%
PPP	Malik Nawab Sher Waseer	43,294	31.12	
PML(Q)	Zahid Nazir	41,068	29.52	
PML(N)	Rai Salah-Ud-Din Khan	37,734	27.13	
Independent	Ch. Muhammad Wasi Zafar	16,121	11.59	
Others	Others (seven candidates)	891	0.64	
Turnout		143,651	56.13	
Total valid votes		139,108	96.84	
Rejected ballots		4,543	3.16	
Majority		2,226	1.60	
Registered electors		255,928		
PPP gain from PML(Q)				

== Election 2013 ==
General elections were held on 11 May 2013.

General election 2013: NA-76 Faisalabad-II
Party	Candidate	Votes	%	±%
PML(N)	Talal Chaudhry	101,797	54.97	
PPP	Malik Nawab Sher Waseer	35,750	19.31	
PTI	Muhammad Waqar Wasi Ch	17,758	9.59	
Independent	Abdul Waheed Khan Niazi	14,290	7.72	
Others	Others (twenty three candidates)	15,575	8.41	
Turnout		191,516	58.16	
Total valid votes		185,170	96.68	
Rejected ballots		6,346	3.32	
Majority		66,047	35.66	
Registered electors		329,266		
PML(N) gain from PPP				

== Election 2018 ==
General elections were held on 25 July 2018.

General election 2018: NA-102 Faisalabad-II
Party	Candidate	Votes	%	±%
PTI	Malik Nawab Sher Waseer	109,708	40.20	+30.7
PML(N)	Talal Chaudhry	97,869	35.86	−19.14
PPP	Shahjhan Khan	19,557	7.33	−11.5
Others	Others (thirteen candidates)	39,058	14.66	
Turnout		272,929	54.67	
Rejected ballots		6,737	2.46	
Majority		11,839	4.34	
Registered electors		499,195		
PTI gain from PML(N)				

== Election 2024 ==
General elections were held on 8 February 2024. Rai Haider Ali Khan won the election with 134,724 votes.

General election 2024: NA-96 Faisalabad-II
Party	Candidate	Votes	%	±%
PTI	Rai Haider Ali Khan (Note: Filed nomination papers as PTI candidate but ECP allowed him to run as an Independent)	134,724	48.99	▲8.79
PML(N)	Malik Nawab Sher Waseer	92,554	33.66	▼2.20
TLP	Syed Asif Ullah Shah Bukhari	18,481	6.72	▲0.67
PPP	Shahjhan Khan	12,332	4.48	▼2.85
Others	Others (twenty candidates)	16,912	6.15	
Turnout		281,118	49.94	▼4.73
Total valid votes		275,003	97.82	
Rejected ballots		6,115	2.18	
Majority		42,170	15.33	▲10.99
Registered electors		562,891		

== By-election 2025 ==
A by-election will be held on 19 November 2025 due to the disqualification of Rai Haider Ali Khan, the previous member from this seat.

By-election 2025: NA-96 Faisalabad-II
Party	Candidate	Votes	%	±%
PML(N)	Muhammad Bilal Badar	93,009	60.94	
Independent	Malik Nawab Sher Waseer	43,025	28.19	
Independent	Arshad Mehmmod	9,388	6.15	
Others	Others (thirteen candidates)	7,206	4.72	
Turnout		155,363	26.46	
Total valid votes		152,628	98.24	
Rejected ballots		2,735	1.76	
Majority		49,984	32.75	
Registered electors		587,124		

== See also ==
- NA-95 Faisalabad-I
- NA-97 Faisalabad-III
