= PP-102 Faisalabad-V =

Constituency of the Punjabi Provincial Legislature, Pakistan

- Constituency for the Provincial Assembly of Punjab
- Region: Jaranwala Tehsil (partly) and Tandlianwala Tehsil (partly) including Tandlianwala Town of Faisalabad District

Current constituency
- Created from: PP-57 Faisalabad-VII (2002-2018); PP-103 Faisalabad-VII (2018-2023)

PP-102 Faisalabad-V (پی پی-103، فیصل آباد-5) is a Constituency of Provincial Assembly of Punjab.

== General elections 2024 ==
Provincial election 2024: PP-102 Faisalabad-V
Party	Candidate	Votes	%	±%
PML(N)	Jaffar Ali Hocha	30,578	24.84	
Independent	Shaheer Dawood Butt (Note: Filed nomination papers as PTI candidate but ECP allowed him to run as an Independent)	30,030	24.39	
PPP	Shamsher Haider	25,300	20.55	
IPP	Sikandar Hayat Khan	17,070	13.87	
Independent	Rai Abdul Qadir	9,647	7.84	
TLP	Bakhsha	3,326	2.70	
Pakistan Muslim Markazi League	Muhammad Rafiq	2,581	2.10	
Others	Others (twelve candidates)	4,574	3.71	
Turnout		128,017	50.98	
Total valid votes		123,106	96.16	
Rejected ballots		4,911	3.84	
Majority		548	0.45	
Registered electors		251,135		
hold				

== By-election 2018 ==
By-election 2018: PP-103 Faisalabad-VII
Party	Candidate	Votes	%	±%
PML(N)	Jaffar Ali Hocha	39,518	38.01	
PTI	Shamsher Haider	33,409	32.13	
Independent	Shaheer Daud Butt	12,641	12.16	
Independent	Muhammad Anwar Khan	9,574	9.21	
Independent	Khalid Mehmood	2,921	2.81	
Independent	Zulfiqar Ali	1,420	1.37	
Independent	Allah Yar	1,248	1.20	
Others	Others (ten candidates)	3,239	3.12	
Turnout		109,929	52.34	
Total valid votes		103,970	94.58	
Rejected ballots		5,959	5.42	
Majority		6,109	5.88	
Registered electors		210,034		
hold				

== General elections 2013 ==
Provincial election 2013: PP-57 Faisalabad-VII
Party	Candidate	Votes	%	±%
PML(N)	Jafar Ali Hocha	37,762	44.86	
Independent	Malik Shamsheer Haidar Watto	16,145	19.18	
Independent	Khalid Mehmood Watto Advocate	8,142	9.67	
PPP	Malik Ghulam Mustafa Watto	7,700	9.15	
PTI	Waqar Mushtaq Toor	4,820	5.73	
JI	Muhammad Irfan Nadeem	2,988	3.55	
Independent	Shahbaz Khan	2,618	3.11	
Others	Others (sixteen candidates)	4,005	4.76	
Turnout		90,991	62.40	
Total valid votes		84,180	92.51	
Rejected ballots		6,811	7.49	
Majority		21,617	25.68	
Registered electors		145,808		
hold				

== General elections 2008 ==
Contesting candidates	Party affiliation	Votes polled

== See also ==
- PP-101 Faisalabad-IV
- PP-103 Faisalabad-VI
