= Azad Ali Tabassum =

Pakistani politician

Member of the Provincial Assembly of the Punjab
- In office August 2013 – 31 May 2018
- Constituency: PP-98 (Faisalabad-1)

Personal details
- Born: 1 January 1968 (age 58) Faisalabad, Punjab, Pakistan
- Party: PMLN (2013-present)

Azad Ali Tabassum (born 1 January 1968) is a Pakistani politician and a member of the Pakistan Muslim League (N). He has been active in Pakistani politics since 1990, beginning his journey at the local level before rising to provincial representation as a Parliamentarian. Prior to entering provincial politics, Tabassum was involved in local governance. He served as a councilor from Union Council No.15 Chak Jhumra. Azad joined the Pakistan Muslim League (N) in 2013 and still maintains affiliation with his party. He was elected for the first time as a member of the Provincial Assembly of the Punjab before 2013 Pakistani general election.

== Early life ==
He was born on 1 January 1968 in Faisalabad, in the village of 188R.B. Nalywala Tehsil Chak Jhumra District Faisalabad. He is a notable personality of chak jhumra.

== Political career ==
He was elected to the Provincial Assembly of the Punjab as a candidate of Pakistan Muslim League (N) from Constituency PP-51 (Faisalabad-I) in by-polls held in August 2013. Azad got the 39,676 votes and his opponent Muhammad Ajmal Cheema candidate of Pakistan Tehreek-e-Insaf got the 22,342 votes. In 2018 Pakistani general election Azad lost his seat and defeated from an independent candidate Muhammad Ajmal Cheema. Afterwards, he lost the seat again in 2022 Pakistani by-elections and defeated from Junaid Afzal Sahi. he regained his seat, second time as a member of Provincial Assembly of the Punjab in 2024 Pakistani by-elections defeated the Muhammad Ajmal Cheema (independent candidate). Azad got the 44,674 votes, his opponent Muhammad Ajmal Cheema got the 35,365 votes PP-98 By Election.
