= Bhaiwala =

- Village
- Location within Pakistan
- Coordinates: 30°53′05″N 72°26′25″E
- Country: Pakistan
- Province: Punjab
- District: Faisalabad
- Time zone: UTC+5 (PST)

Bhaiwala is a village in Faisalabad, Pakistan. It is also officially known as 202 RB Bhaiwala.

Bhaiwala is one of the most developed villages in Faisalabad with a population of nearly 40,000. It was known as Talagarh before its name was changed to Bhaiwala. The neighboring villages of Bhaiwala are Ghona, Gatti and Chak Jhumra.

Administratively, Gatti and Bhaiwala both are one called 202 RB Bhaiwala or simply Bhaiwala.

== Notable people ==
- Mahmud Ahmed belonged to Bhaiwala
