= Muhammad Akram Chaudhary =

Pakistani politician

Member of the Provincial Assembly of Punjab
- Incumbent
- Assumed office 24 February 2024
- In office 1997–1999
- In office 1990–1993

Personal details
- Political party: PTI (2024-present)

Muhammad Akram Chaudhary is a Pakistani politician who has been a Member of the Provincial Assembly of the Punjab since 2024.

== Political career ==
He was elected to the Provincial Assembly of the Punjab as a Pakistan Tehreek-e-Insaf-backed independent candidate from constituency PP-101 Faisalabad-IV in the 2024 Pakistani general election.
