= PP-99 Faisalabad-II =

Constituency of the Punjabi Provincial Legislature, Pakistan

- Constituency for the Provincial Assembly of Punjab
- Region: Jaranwala Tehsil (partly) including Khurrianwala town of Faisalabad District

Current constituency
- Created from: PP-52 Faisalabad-II (2002-2018); PP-98 Faisalabad-II (2018-2023)

PP-99 Faisalabad-II (پی پی-99، فیصل آباد-2) is a Constituency of Provincial Assembly of Punjab.

== General elections 2024 ==
Provincial election 2024: PP-99 Faisalabad-II
Party	Candidate	Votes	%	±%
Independent	Ahmad Mujtaba Chaudhary (Note: Filed nomination papers as PTI candidate but ECP allowed him to run as an Independent)	56,016	45.67	
PML(N)	Muhammad Shoaib Idrees	43,400	35.38	
TLP	Abrar Hussain	14,041	11.45	
PPP	Muhammad Nabi Ahmad	2,198	1.79	
Others	Others (twenty seven candidates)	7,008	5.71	
Turnout		125,390	52.93	
Total valid votes		122,663	97.83	
Rejected ballots		2,727	2.17	
Majority		12,616	10.29	
Registered electors		236,907		
hold				

== General elections 2018 ==
Provincial election 2018: PP-98 Faisalabad-II
Party	Candidate	Votes	%	±%
PML(N)	Muhammad Shoaib Idrees	55,727	44.24	
PTI	Muhammad Afzal	44,993	35.72	
Independent	Ashfaq Ahmad	6,816	5.41	
TLP	Muhammad Akram	5,707	4.53	
Independent	Muhammad Pervaiz	3,741	2.97	
PPP	Muhammad Azeem Aslam	2,583	2.05	
AAT	Javed Ahmad Chatha	2,538	2.02	
PST	Muhammad Adil	1,332	1.06	
Others	Others (thirteen candidates)	2,540	2.00	
Turnout		131,888	59.01	
Total valid votes		125,977	95.52	
Rejected ballots		5,911	4.48	
Majority		10,734	8.52	
Registered electors		223,512		

== General elections 2013 ==
Provincial election 2013: PP-52 Faisalabad-II
Party	Candidate	Votes	%	±%
PML(N)	M. Afzal Sahi	54,814	59.42	
PTI	Dr. Tauqeer Anwaar	14,603	15.83	
PPP	Chaudhary Manzoor Ahmad	5,911	6.41	
Independent	Chaudhary Saif Ullah Cheema	5,553	6.02	
Independent	Malik Tehseen Awan	3,259	3.53	
Independent	Anjum Iqbal Bajwa	3,149	3.41	
JI	Ali Ahmad Goraya	2,124	2.30	
PST	Pir Syed Munir Hussain Shah Noori	1,401	1.52	
Others	Others (fifteen candidates)	1,428	1.55	
Turnout		94,716	61.39	
Total valid votes		92,242	97.39	
Rejected ballots		2,474	2.61	
Majority		40,211	43.59	
Registered electors		154,283		

== General elections 2008 ==
Contesting candidates	Party affiliation	Votes polled

== See also ==
- PP-98 Faisalabad-I
- PP-100 Faisalabad-III
