= Constituency NA-162 =

Former constituency of the National Assembly of Pakistan

Constituency NA-162 (Sahiwal-III)
- Former constituency for the National Assembly of Pakistan
- Region: Sahiwal District

Former constituency
- Created: 2002
- Abolished: 2018
- Replaced by: NA-149 (Sahiwal-III)

Constituency NA-162 (Sahiwal-III) (Urdu: این اے-۱۶۲، ساہِيوال-۳) was a constituency for the National Assembly of Pakistan. It was abolished after the 2018 delimitations, with the majority of its constituent Chichawatni Tehsil going to NA-149 (Sahiwal-III) along with a lesser share for NA-148 (Sahiwal-II).

== Election 2002 ==
General elections were held on 10 Oct 2002. Rai Aziz Ullah Khan an independent candidate won by 73,918 votes.

General election 2002: NA-162 Sahiwal-III
Party	Candidate	Votes	%	±%
PML(Q)	Rai Aziz Ullah Khan	73,918	57.49	
PPP	Sheikh Javed Rafi	44,807	34.85	
MMA	Ch. Ikram Ullah Khan	5,623	4.37	
PML(N)	Ch. Muhammad Iqbal Kung	2,858	2.22	
Independent	Rai Naeem Ullah Khan	1,370	1.07	
Turnout		131,579	48.72	
Total valid votes		128,576	97.72	
Rejected ballots		3,003	2.28	
Majority		29,111	22.64	
Registered electors		270,096		

== Election 2008 ==
General elections were held on 18 Feb 2008. Chaudhry Zahid Iqbal of PPP won by 70,634 votes.

General election 2008: NA-162 Sahiwal-III
Party	Candidate	Votes	%	±%
PPP	Ch. Zahid Iqbal	70,634	50.23	
Independent	Rai Aziz Ullah Khan	65,440	46.54	
MMA	Muhammad Usman	4,042	2.87	
Independent	Saeed Ahmad Ch.	507	0.36	
Turnout		144,136	57.62	
Total valid votes		140,623	97.56	
Rejected ballots		3,513	2.44	
Majority		5,194	3.69	
Registered electors		250,159		

== By-Election 2012 ==
By-Election 2012: NA-162 Sahiwal-III
Party	Candidate	Votes	%	±%
PML(N)	Ch. Zahid Iqbal	75,579	45.66	
Independent	Rai Hassan Nawaz Khan	65,414	39.52	
PPP	Mehar Muhammad Ali Farid Kathia	15,116	9.13	
Independent	Ch. Muhammad Imran Bhullar Jutt	6,978	4.22	
Others	Others (seven candidates)	2,430	1.47	
Turnout		169,699	57.58	
Total valid votes		165,517	97.54	
Rejected ballots		4,182	2.46	
Majority		10,165	6.14	
Registered electors		294,702		

== Election 2013 ==
General elections were held on 11 May 2013. Rai Hassan Nawaz of Pakistan tehreek insaf won by 88,974 votes and became the member of National Assembly.

General election 2013: NA-162 Sahiwal-III
Party	Candidate	Votes	%	±%
PTI	Rai Hasan Nawaz Khan	88,974	49.62	
Independent	Muhammad Ayub	75,756	42.25	
PPP	Ch. Sharaqat Rasool Ghumman	9,609	5.36	
Others	Others (seven candidates)	4,973	2.77	
Turnout		182,996	59.73	
Total valid votes		179,312	97.99	
Rejected ballots		3,684	2.01	
Majority		13,218	7.37	
Registered electors		306,359		

== By-Election 2016 ==
By-Election 2016: NA-162 Sahiwal-III
Party	Candidate	Votes	%	±%
PML(N)	Ch. Muhammad Tufail	73,813	48.03	
PTI	Rai Muhammad Murtaza Iqbal	61,998	40.34	
PPP	Shahzad Saeed Cheema	16,924	10.36	
Others	Others (seven candidates)	1,962	1.27	
Turnout		155,330	45.64	
Total valid votes		153,697	98.95	
Rejected ballots		1,633	1.05	
Majority		11,815	7.69	
Registered electors		340,347		
