= Ghulam Rasool Sahi =

Pakistani politician (born 1944)

Ghulam Rasul Sahi
- غلام رسول ساہی

Member of the National Assembly of Pakistan
- In office 1 June 2013 – 17 May 2018
- Constituency: NA-75 (Faisalabad-I)
- In office 2002–2007
- Constituency: NA-75 (Faisalabad-I)

Personal details
- Born: 9 July 1944 (age 82)
- Other political affiliations: PTI (2018-2023); PMLN (2013-2018); PML(Q) (2002-2013)
- Relations: Muhammad Afzal Sahi (brother); Ali Afzal Sahi (nephew); Junaid Afzal Sahi (nephew)

Ghulam Rasool Sahi (Urdu: غلام رسول ساہی; born 9 July 1944) is a Pakistani politician who has been a member of the National Assembly of Pakistan, from 2002 to 2007 and again from June 2013 to May 2018.

== Early life ==
He was born on 9 July 1944 in Faisalabad. He received his education from Faisalabad and later joined Pakistan Army. He participated in the 1971 Indo-Pakistan war. He retired as a Lieutenant Colonel.

== Political career ==
He was elected to the National Assembly of Pakistan as a candidate of Pakistan Muslim League (Q) (PML-Q) from Constituency NA-75 (Faisalabad-I) in the 2002 Pakistani general election. He received 55,464 votes and defeated Wajid Mustafa Bajwa, a candidate of Pakistan Peoples Party (PPP).

He ran for the seat of the National Assembly as a candidate of PML-Q from Constituency NA-75 (Faisalabad-I) in the 2008 Pakistani general election but was unsuccessful. He received 68,196 votes and lost the seat to Tariq Mahmood Bajwa.

He was re-elected to the National Assembly as a candidate of Pakistan Muslim League (N) (PML-N) from Constituency NA-75 (Faisalabad-I) in the 2013 Pakistani general election. He received 130,300 votes and defeated Fawad Ahmad Cheema, a candidate of Pakistan Tehreek-e-Insaf.

In May 2018, he quit PML-N and resigned from the National Assembly.
