= PP-101 Faisalabad-IV =

Constituency of the Punjabi Provincial Legislature, Pakistan

- Constituency for the Provincial Assembly of Punjab
- Region: Jaranwala Tehsil (partly) including Jaranwala city and Tandlianwala Tehsil including Tandlianwala town of Faisalabad District

Current constituency
- Created from: PP-54 Faisalabad-IV (2002-2018); PP-101 Faisalabad-V (2018-2023)

PP-101 Faisalabad-IV (پی پی-101، فیصل آباد-4) is a Constituency of Provincial Assembly of Punjab.

== General elections 2024 ==
Provincial election 2024: PP-101 Faisalabad-IV
Party	Candidate	Votes	%	±%
Independent	Muhammad Akram Chaudhry (Note: Filed nomination papers as PTI candidate but ECP allowed him to run as an Independent)	73,593	47.55	
PML(N)	Muhammad Ashraf Ch.	50,132	32.39	
PPP	Muhammad Shoaib	7,219	4.66	
Independent	Samiullah Bajwa	6,160	3.98	
Pakistan Muslim Markazi League	Abdul Mannan Afsar	5,580	3.61	
JI	Basim Saeed	4,323	2.79	
Independent	Faisal Zulfiqar Ahmed	2,146	1.39	
Independent	Haji Muhammad Rizwan	2,090	1.35	
Others	Others (twenty eight candidates)	3,526	2.28	
Turnout		158,350	49.18	
Total valid votes		154,769	97.74	
Rejected ballots		3,581	2.26	
Majority		23,461	15.16	
Registered electors		321,979		
hold				

== General elections 2018 ==
Provincial election 2018: PP-101 Faisalabad-V
Party	Candidate	Votes	%	±%
PML(N)	Rai Haidar Ali Khan	46,097	36.97	
PTI	Ghulam Haider Bari	44,308	35.54	
TLP	Walayat Ali	14,502	11.63	
PPP	Rai Shahbaz Khan Kalyar	8,775	7.04	
Independent	Arshad Mehmood	6,046	4.85	
AAT	Kashif Altaf	2,163	1.74	
Others	Others (twelve candidates)	2,793	2.23	
Turnout		127,680	54.92	
Total valid votes		124,684	97.65	
Rejected ballots		2,996	2.35	
Majority		1,789	1.43	
Registered electors		232,500		

== General elections 2013 ==
Provincial election 2013: PP-54 Faisalabad-IV
Party	Candidate	Votes	%	±%
PML(N)	Rai Haidar Ali Khan	50,641	55.51	
PTI	Ghulam Haider Bari	21,989	24.10	
PPP	Rai Muhammad Shah Jahan Khan Kharal	10,018	10.98	
JI	Doctor Saeed Ahmad	2,306	2.53	
Independent	Shoaib Khan Niazi	1,764	1.93	
SIC	Dr. Mian Muhammad Ramzan	1,381	1.51	
Independent	Choudhary Azhar Hussain	1,095	1.20	
Others	Others (twenty eight candidates)	2,042	2.24	
Turnout		95,202	58.29	
Total valid votes		91,236	95.83	
Rejected ballots		3,966	4.17	
Majority		28,652	31.41	
Registered electors		163,311		

== General elections 2008 ==
Contesting candidates	Party affiliation	Votes polled

== See also ==
- PP-100 Faisalabad-III
- PP-102 Faisalabad-V
