= NA-143 Sahiwal-III =

Constituency of the National Assembly of Pakistan

- Constituency for the National Assembly of Pakistan
- Region: Sahiwal Tehsil (partly) and Chichawatni Tehsil (partly) including Chichawatni City of Sahiwal District
- Electorate: 584,698

Current constituency
- Party: PMLN
- Member: Chaudhary Muhammad Tufail
- Created from: NA-163 Sahiwal-IV

NA-143 Sahiwal-III (این اے-143، ساہِيوال-3) is a constituency for the National Assembly of Pakistan.

== Election 2002 ==
General elections were held on 10 October 2002. Farooq Leghari of National Alliance won by 39,312 votes.

General election 2002: NA-163 Sahiwal-IV
Party	Candidate	Votes	%	±%
NA	Farooq Leghari	39,312	30.97	
PPP	Begum Shahnaz Javed	35,496	27.96	
PML(Q)	Saeed Ahmad Ch.	34,356	27.07	
Independent	Muhammad Ghulam Sarwar	15,715	12.38	
Others	Others (two candidates)	2,057	1.62	
Turnout		131,006	50.50	
Total valid votes		126,936	96.89	
Rejected ballots		4,070	3.11	
Majority		3,816	3.01	
Registered electors		259,416		

== By-election 2003 ==
By-election 2003: NA-163 Sahiwal-IV
Party	Candidate	Votes	%	±%
Independent	Saeed Ahmad Ch.	54,961	53.07	
PPP	Begum Shahnaz Javed	30,227	29.19	
MMA	Maj. (R) Muhammad Ghulam Sarwar	18,214	17.59	
NA	Naveed Anwar Bhinder	156	0.15	
Turnout		104,310	40.21	
Total valid votes		103,558	99.28	
Rejected ballots		752	0.72	
Majority		24,734	23.88	
Registered electors		259,416		

== Election 2008 ==
General elections were held on 18 February 2008. Nauman Ahmad Langrial of PML-Q won by 39,864 votes.

General election 2008: NA-163 Sahiwal-IV
Party	Candidate	Votes	%	±%
PML(Q)	Nauman Ahmad Langrial	39,864	30.23	
PPP	Begum Shahnaz Javed	37,986	28.81	
PML(N)	Muhammad Munir Azhar	34,644	26.28	
Independent	Saeed Ahmad Ch.	17,708	13.43	
Pakistan Brohi Party	Makhdoom Nasir Farid Chishti	1,650	1.25	
Turnout		135,623	61.81	
Total valid votes		131,852	97.22	
Rejected ballots		3,771	2.79	
Majority		1,878	1.42	
Registered electors		219,426		
PML(Q) gain from NA				

== Election 2013 ==
General elections were held on 11 May 2013. Muhammad Munir Azhar of PML-N won by 89,126 votes and became the member of National Assembly.

General election 2013: NA-163 Sahiwal-IV
Party	Candidate	Votes	%	±%
PML(N)	Muhammad Munir Azhar	89,126	51.19	▲24.91
PML(Q)	Nauman Ahmad Langrial	67,076	38.52	▲8.31
PTI	Aftab Irshad Cheema	16,311	9.37	
Others	Others (five candidates)	1,602	0.92	
Turnout		178,197	64.52	▲2.71
Total valid votes		174,115	97.71	
Rejected ballots		4,082	2.29	
Majority		22,050	12.67	
Registered electors		276,191		
PML(N) gain from PML(Q)				

== Election 2018 ==
General elections were held on 25 July 2018. Rai Muhammad Murtaza Iqbal won the election with 140,338 votes.

General election 2018: NA-149 Sahiwal-III
Party	Candidate	Votes	%	±%
PTI	Rai Muhammad Murtaza Iqbal	140,338	50.17	▲40.80
PML(N)	Chaudhry Muhammad Tufail	114,244	40.84	▼10.35
PPP	Ali Javed	11,879	4.25	
AAT	Muhammad Ashraf	4,997	1.79	
Tehreek Labbaik Islam	Muhammad Shakeel	3,046	1.09	
MMA	Muhammad Haq Nawaz Khan	2,110	0.75	
Independent	Ashiq Hussain	880	0.31	
Independent	Muhammad Hamza	850	0.30	
APML	Rana Hamid	711	0.25	
Independent	Muhammad Arshad	393	0.14	
NP	Amna Naz	169	0.06	
Independent	Masood Khan	85	0.03	
Turnout		284,244	57.15	▼7.37
Total valid votes		279,702	98.40	
Rejected ballots		4,542	1.60	
Majority		26,144	9.35	
Registered electors		497,331		
PTI gain from PML(N)				

== Election 2024 ==
General elections were held on 8 February 2024. Rai Hassan Nawaz won the election with 147,887 votes.

General election 2024: NA-143 Sahiwal-III
Party	Candidate	Votes	%	±%
PTI	Rai Hassan Nawaz (Note: Filed nomination papers as PTI candidate but ECP allowed him to run as an Independent)	147,887	45.84	▼4.33
Independent	Chaudhry Muhammad Tufail	83,806	25.98	
IPP	Nauman Ahmad Langrial	32,273	10.00	
Independent	Chaudhry Zahid Iqbal	19,990	6.20	
TLP	Majid Hussain	17,687	5.48	
Others	Others (twelve candidates)	20,941	6.49	
Turnout		328,575	56.20	▼0.95
Total valid votes		322,584	98.18	
Rejected ballots		5,991	1.82	
Majority		64,081	19.86	▲10.51
Registered electors		584,698		

== By-election 2025 ==
A by-election will be held on 16 November 2025 due to the disqualification of Rai Hassan Nawaz, the previous member from this seat.

By-election 2025: NA-143 Sahiwal-III
Party	Candidate	Votes	%	±%
PML(N)	Chaudhry Muhammad Tufail	119,334	92.65	
PPP	Zarar Akbar Chaudhry	9,642	7.35	
Turnout		130,695	21.42	
Total valid votes		128,796	98.55	
Rejected ballots		1,899	1.45	
Majority		109,872	85.30	
Registered electors		610,044		

== See also ==
- NA-142 Sahiwal-II
- NA-144 Khanewal-I
