= PP-98 Faisalabad-I =

Constituency of the Punjabi Provincial Legislature, Pakistan

- Constituency for the Provincial Assembly of Punjab
- Region: Chak Jhumra Tehsil and Faisalabad Sadar Tehsil (partly) of Faisalabad District

Current constituency
- Created from: PP-51 Faisalabad-I (2002-2018); PP-97 Faisalabad-I (2018-2023)

PP-98 Faisalabad-I (پی پی-98، فیصل آباد-1) is a Constituency of Provincial Assembly of Punjab.

Election 2013, Azad Ali Tabassum of Pakistan Muslim League (Nawaz) won the seat of MPA from PP – 51 FAISALABAD I by collecting 39, 676. Muhammad Ajmal Cheema of Pakistan Tehreek-e-Insaf place second by taking 22,342 votes in PP – 51 FAISALABAD I. For 2018 General elections the new constituencies were made and PP-51 was named as Gujranwala-1. In 2018, General Elections Shaukat Manzoor Cheema of Pakistan Muslim League (Nawaz) won the seat and became the member of Provisional Assembly of Punjab. Due to the demise of PML-N parliamentarian the seat was vacant and a by-election was conducted on 19 February 2021 in which Tallat Mehmood of Pakistan Muslim League (Nawaz) won the election by securing 53,903 votes.

== By-election 2025 ==
A by-election will be held on 5 October 2025 due to the disqualification of Junaid Afzal Sahi, the previous member from this seat.

By-election 2025: PP-98 Faisalabad-I
Party	Candidate	Votes	%	±%
PML(N)	Azad Ali Tabassum	44,388	42.32	
PST	Muhammad Ajmal Cheema	35,246	33.60	
PTI	Waseem Akram	24,098	22.98	
Others	Others (five candidates)	1,156	1.10	
Turnout		106,658	36.82	
Total valid votes		104,888	98.34	
Rejected ballots		1,770	1.66	
Majority		9,120	8.72	
Registered electors		289,690		
hold				

== General elections 2024 ==
Provincial elections were held on 8 February 2024.

Provincial election 2024: PP-98 Faisalabad-I
Party	Candidate	Votes	%	±%
Independent	Junaid Afzal Sahi (Note: Filed nomination papers as PTI candidate but ECP allowed him to run as an Independent)	73,565	47.75	
IPP	Muhammad Ajmal Cheema	47,834	31.05	
TLP	Muhammad Awais Tahir	12,562	8.15	
PPP	Faraz Anees	5,566	3.61	
Independent	Khurram Babar Rafiq	5,278	3.43	
Independent	Tahira Ahmad	2,378	1.54	
Others	Others (eleven candidates)	6,886	4.47	
Turnout		158,664	57.13	
Total valid votes		154,069	97.10	
Rejected ballots		4,595	2.90	
Majority		25,731	16.70	
Registered electors		277,734		
hold				

== General elections 2018 ==
Provincial election 2018: PP-97 Faisalabad-I
Party	Candidate	Votes	%	±%
Independent	Muhammad Ajmal	42,405	34.33	
PTI	Ali Afzal Sahi	37,973	30.74	
PML(N)	Azad Ali Tabassum	35,141	28.45	
TLP	Muhammad Afzal	4,436	3.59	
PPP	Tariq Mehmood	1,678	1.36	
Others	Others (eight candidates)	1,888	1.53	
Turnout		127,419	58.22	
Total valid votes		123,521	96.94	
Rejected ballots		3,898	3.06	
Majority		4,432	3.59	
Registered electors		218,872		

== By-elections 2013 ==
By-elections 2013: PP-51 Faisalabad-I
Party	Candidate	Votes	%	±%
PML(N)	Azad Ali Tabassum	39,676	53.36	
PTI	Muhammad Ajmal Cheema	22,342	30.05	
Independent	Syed Azhar Hussain Shah	9,929	13.35	
PPP	Malik Muhammad Ali Sadhan Awan	1,423	1.91	
Others	Others (eleven candidates)	983	1.32	
Turnout		76,037	45.48	
Total valid votes		74,353	97.79	
Rejected ballots		1,684	2.21	
Majority		17,334	23.31	
Registered electors		167,180		

== General elections 2008 ==
Contesting candidates	Party affiliation	Votes polled

== See also ==
- PP-97 Chiniot-IV
- PP-99 Faisalabad-II
