= Junaid Afzal Sahi =

Pakistani politician

- جنید افضل ساہی

Member of the Provincial Assembly of Punjab
- In office 24 February 2024 – 5 August 2025
- Constituency: PP-98 Faisalabad-I

Personal details
- Born: 15 September 1982 (age 44) Faisalabad, Punjab, Pakistan
- Party: PTI (2024-present)
- Relations: Ali Afzal Sahi (brother); Ghulam Rasool Sahi (uncle)
- Parent: Muhammad Afzal Sahi (father)

Junaid Afzal Sahi is a Pakistani politician and a lawyer from Chak Jhumra who served as a Member of the Provincial Assembly of the Punjab from February 2024 to August 2025 after contesting the 2024 Pakistani general election. Junaid took the oath as a member on 23 Feb 2024. He served as member district council Faisalabad from 2015-2020.

== Political career ==
He was elected to the Provincial Assembly of the Punjab as a Pakistan Tehreek-e-Insaf-backed independent candidate from constituency PP-98 Faisalabad-I in the 2024 Pakistani general election. In assembly, Pakistan Tehreek-e-Insaf backed candidates joined the party the Sunni Ittihad Council, for the assembly presence. Junaids' family has strong roots in Pakistan politics; his father Muhammad Afzal Sahi, was the Ex speaker of Provincial Assembly of the Punjab from 2002 to 2008. Junaids' brother, Ali Afzal Sahi is the sitting member of the National Assembly of Pakistan. His uncle Ghulam Rasool Sahi and his cousin Zafar Zulqarnain sahi is ex-members of assemblies. Half of Sahi family are serving in politics, and the others are in department of Pakistan army. The Sahi family also has their business in their constituency.

== Conviction and Disqualification ==
On 31 July 2025, Sahi and 195 others were convicted by a court in Faisalabad and sentenced to up to 10-years' imprisonment over the 2023 Pakistani protests. On 5 August 2025, the Election Commission of Pakistan disqualified him due to his conviction. On 13 May 2026, the Lahore High Court suspended his 10-year prison sentence that had been given in Aug 2025 in the case of 9 May.
