= Sahianwala =

Sahianwala ساہیاںوالا
- Interactive map of Sahianwala
- Country: Pakistan
- Province: Punjab
- District: Faisalabad

Population
  - Total: 1,500

Sahianwala (Urdu: ساہیاںوالا) is a village in Faisalabad District near Salarwala and M-3 motorway. The village population is approximately 1,500. It is located approximately 12 km from Chak No 14 Muradwala.
