= Chak Jhumra =

Town in Faisalabad District, Pakistan

Chak Jhumra چک جھمرہ
- Town
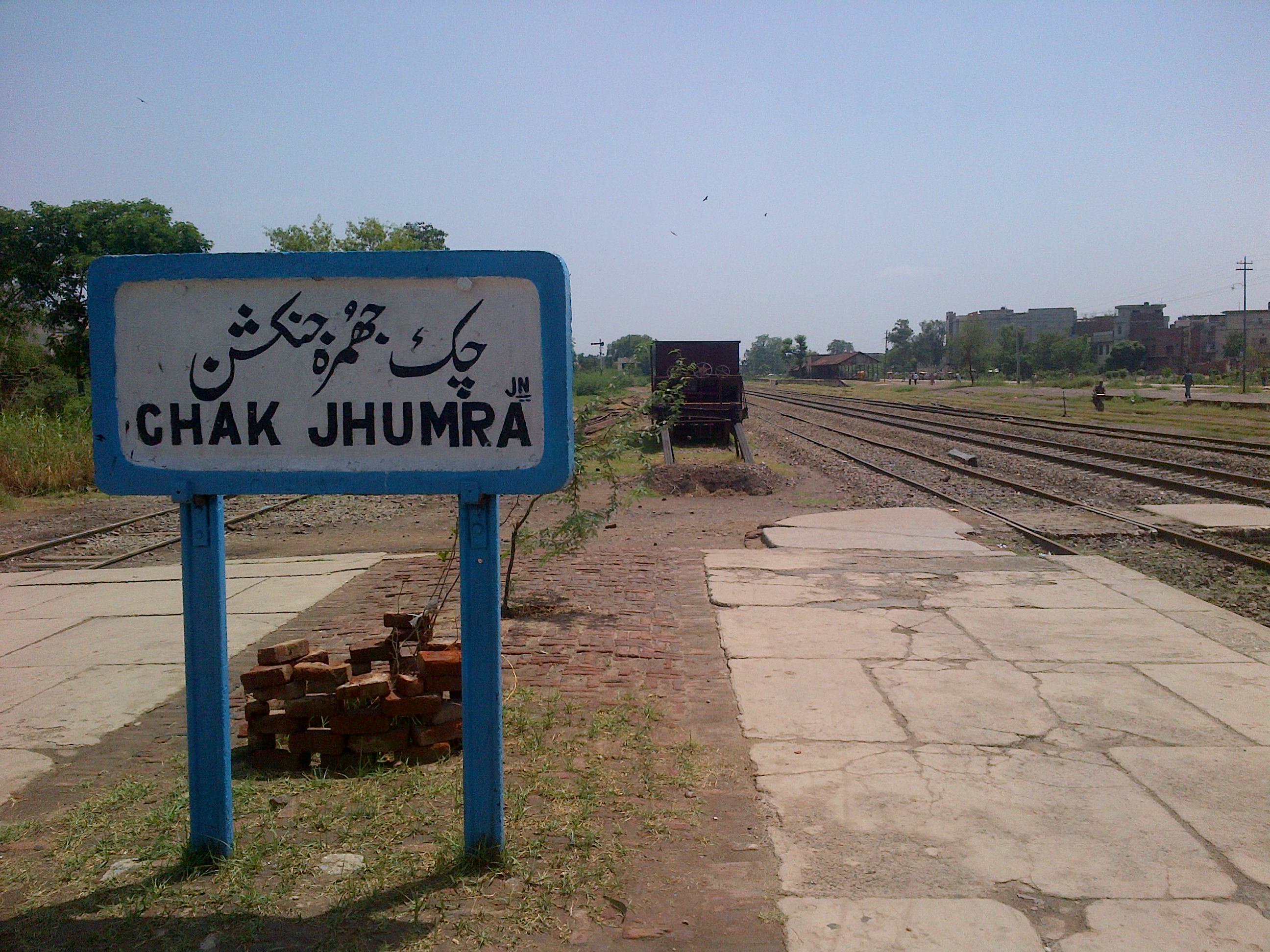
- Chak Jhumra railways

- Municipal Committee logo

- Location in Pakistan
- Coordinates: 31°34′N 73°11′E
- Country: Pakistan
- Region: Punjab
- District: Faisalabad

Population (2023)
  - Total: 60,131
- Time zone: UTC+5 (PST)
- Postal code: 37700
- Area code: 041

Chak Jhumra (Punjabi: چک جُھمرہ) is a town and railway junction located in Punjab, Pakistan. The town is situated approximately 21 kilometres (13 mi) northeast of Faisalabad on Faisalabad-Sangla Hill Road. The Khanewal–Wazirabad Branch and Sangla Hill–Kundian Branch of Pakistan Railways intersect in the town, connecting Faisalabad and Sargodha respectively. Chak Jhumra is classified as a railway junction rather than a simple station. As it connects two rail lines. Chak Jhumra is considered the oldest and historical tehsil of Faisalabad.

Beginning in the 1960s, the town experienced economic growth and infrastructure. development. During this period, a number of schools, hospitals, and textile factories were established within the town.

== Demographics ==
Population

Historical population
Year	Pop.	±%
1972	16,278	—
1981	17,420	+7.0%
1998	32,111	+84.3%
2017	48,796	+52.0%
2023	60,131	+23.2%

According to official 2023 census results, the population of Chak Jhumra city is 60,131.

== Education Institutions ==
The following educational institutes are established in Chak Jhumra:

=== Colleges ===
- Govt. Higher secondary school & College
- Punjab collage JK Campus
- Al Falah Group of School & College
- Kips College
- Govt. Degree College for Boys
- Govt. Degree College for Woman
- The City School and College
- Government Technical College for Women

=== Schools ===
- Eden Hall Grammar High & Montessori School System
- Govt. High School Railway Road Chak jhumra Near Nadra office and Post Office Chak Jhumra, Formerly Govt. Elementary Chak Jhumra.
- Global School and College
- Dar-e-Arqam School
- Bloomstar school system
- Allied School Jhumra
- Al-falah School System
- City School Chak Jhumra
- The Nation school system
- The Aims School
- Quid Public School
- Visdome Public School and College

== Notable people ==
Chak Jhumra has produced several notable people and is known for its ancient history. Muhammad Khan Junejo won his election from Chak Jhumra constituency in 1985 and subsequently elected as the Prime minister of Pakistan. Former speaker Punjab assembly Muhammad Afzal Sahi, former minister of Social Welfare Muhammad Ajmal Cheema, and former Punjab minister for communications and works Ali Afzal Sahi also belongs to Jhumra. Other Parliamentarians with roots in the town Ghulam Rasool Sahi, Junaid Afzal Sahi, and Azad Ali Tabassum. Pakistani international cricketer Waqas Maqsood also belongs to chak jhumra.
