= PP-100 Faisalabad-III =

Constituency of the Punjabi Provincial Legislature, Pakistan

- Constituency for the Provincial Assembly of Punjab
- Region: Jaranwala Tehsil (partly) including Jaranwala Saddar of Faisalabad District

Current constituency
- Created from: PP-53 Faisalabad-III (2002-2018); PP-100 Faisalabad-IV (2018-2023)

PP-100 Faisalabad-III (پی پی-100، فیصل آباد-3) is a Constituency of Provincial Assembly of Punjab.

== General elections 2024 ==
Provincial election 2024: PP-100 Faisalabad-III
Party	Candidate	Votes	%	±%
PML(N)	Khan Bahadar	44,147	40.17	
Independent	Umair Wasi Chaudhary (Note: Filed nomination papers as PTI candidate but ECP allowed him to run as an Independent)	38,699	35.21	
PPP	Rai Waqas Aslam	12,864	11.70	
Independent	Shahid Iqbal Awan	7,178	6.53	
JI	Muhammad Tahir Khan	2,691	2.45	
Others	Others (twenty five candidates)	4,329	3.94	
Turnout		122,791	50.97	
Total valid votes		109,908	89.51	
Rejected ballots		12,883	10.49	
Majority		5,448	4.96	
Registered electors		240,912		

== General elections 2018 ==
Provincial election 2018: PP-100 Faisalabad-IV
Party	Candidate	Votes	%	±%
PTI	Zaheer Ud Din	41,357	35.63	
PML(N)	Iffat Miraj Awan	25,113	21.64	
Independent	Khan Bahadar	21,945	18.91	
PPP	Shafqat Rana	7,366	6.35	
TLP	Falak Sheer Sikandar	6,574	5.66	
Independent	Umair Wasi Choudhary	5,375	4.63	
MMA	Abdul Waheed Khan	4,557	3.93	
AAT	Nisar Anmad	2,067	1.78	
Others	Others (ten candidates)	2,459	1.47	
Turnout		121,491	53.66	
Total valid votes		116,813	96.15	
Rejected ballots		4,678	3.85	
Majority		16,244	13.99	
Registered electors		226,406		

== General elections 2013 ==
Provincial election 2013: PP-53 Faisalabad-III
Party	Candidate	Votes	%	±%
PML(N)	Iffat Maraj Awan	44,754	47.91	
PTI	Malik Zafar Iqbal Khokhar	14,996	16.05	
PPP	Abdul Rehman Rana	12,639	13.53	
Independent	Shoukat Ali	4,777	5.11	
JI	Abdul Waheed Khan	3,474	3.72	
PML(J)	Choudhary Munir Ahmad Khan Adocate	3,289	3.52	
Independent	Mian Ali Akbar Advocate	2,857	3.06	
Independent	Khalid Mehmood Khan	1,063	1.14	
Others	Others (twenty nine candidates)	5,573	5.97	
Turnout		96,738	58.29	
Total valid votes		93,422	96.57	
Rejected ballots		3,316	3.43	
Majority		29,758	31.86	
Registered electors		165,955		

== General elections 2008 ==
Contesting candidates	Party affiliation	Votes polled

== See also ==
- PP-99 Faisalabad-II
- PP-101 Faisalabad-IV
