= Chichawatni =

City in Punjab, Pakistan

Chichawatni چیچہ وطنی
- City
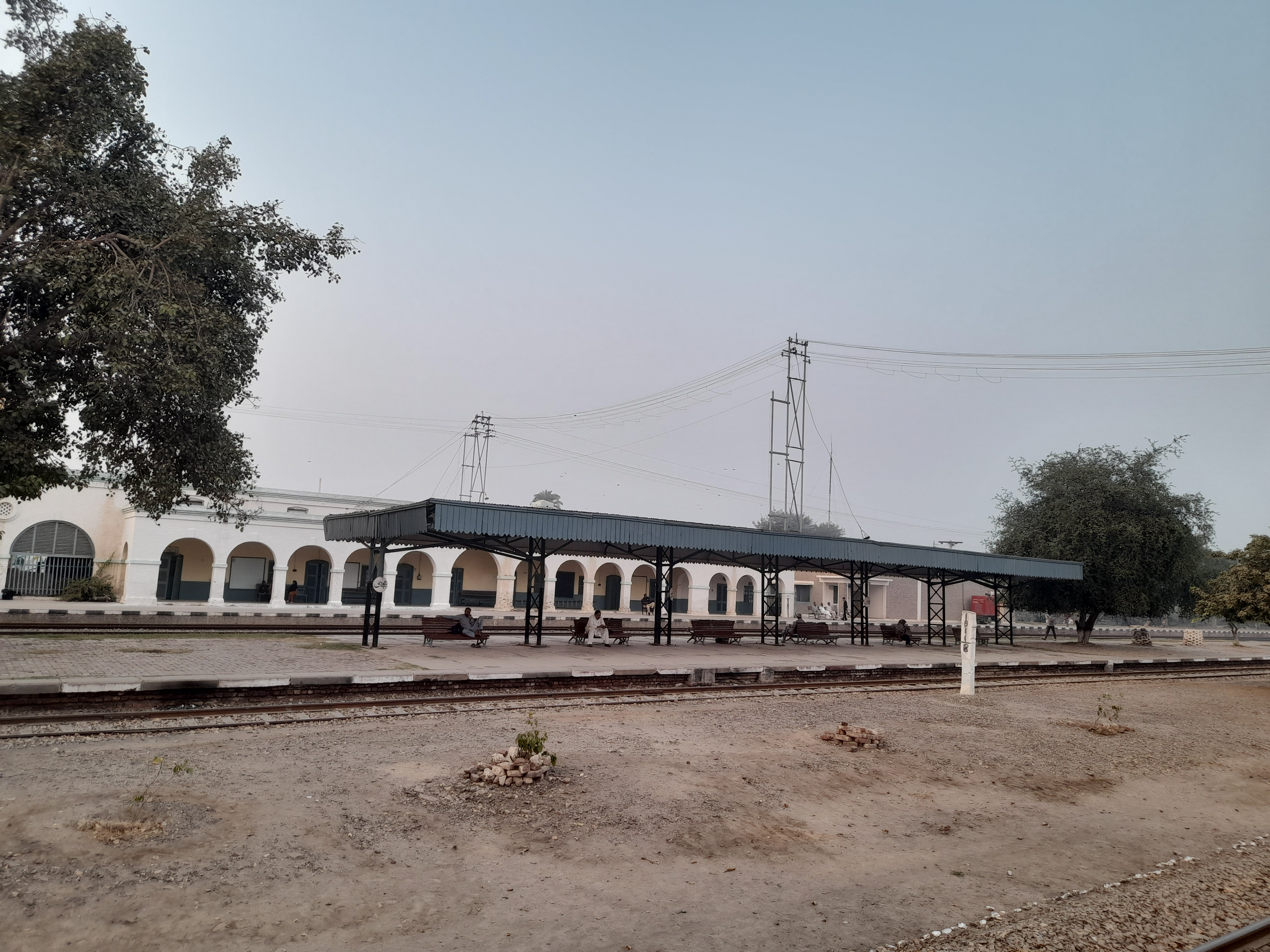
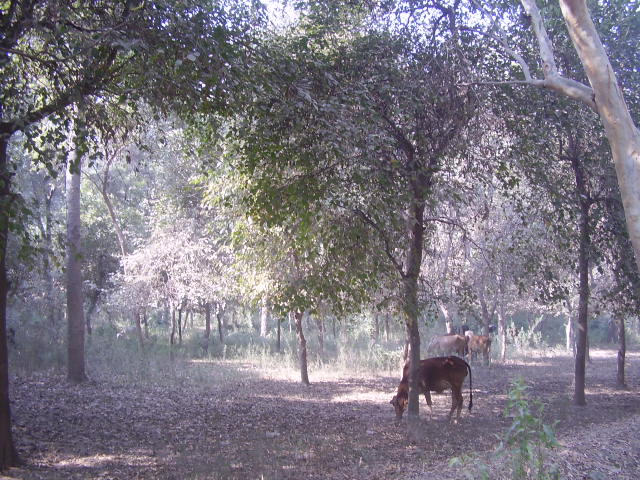
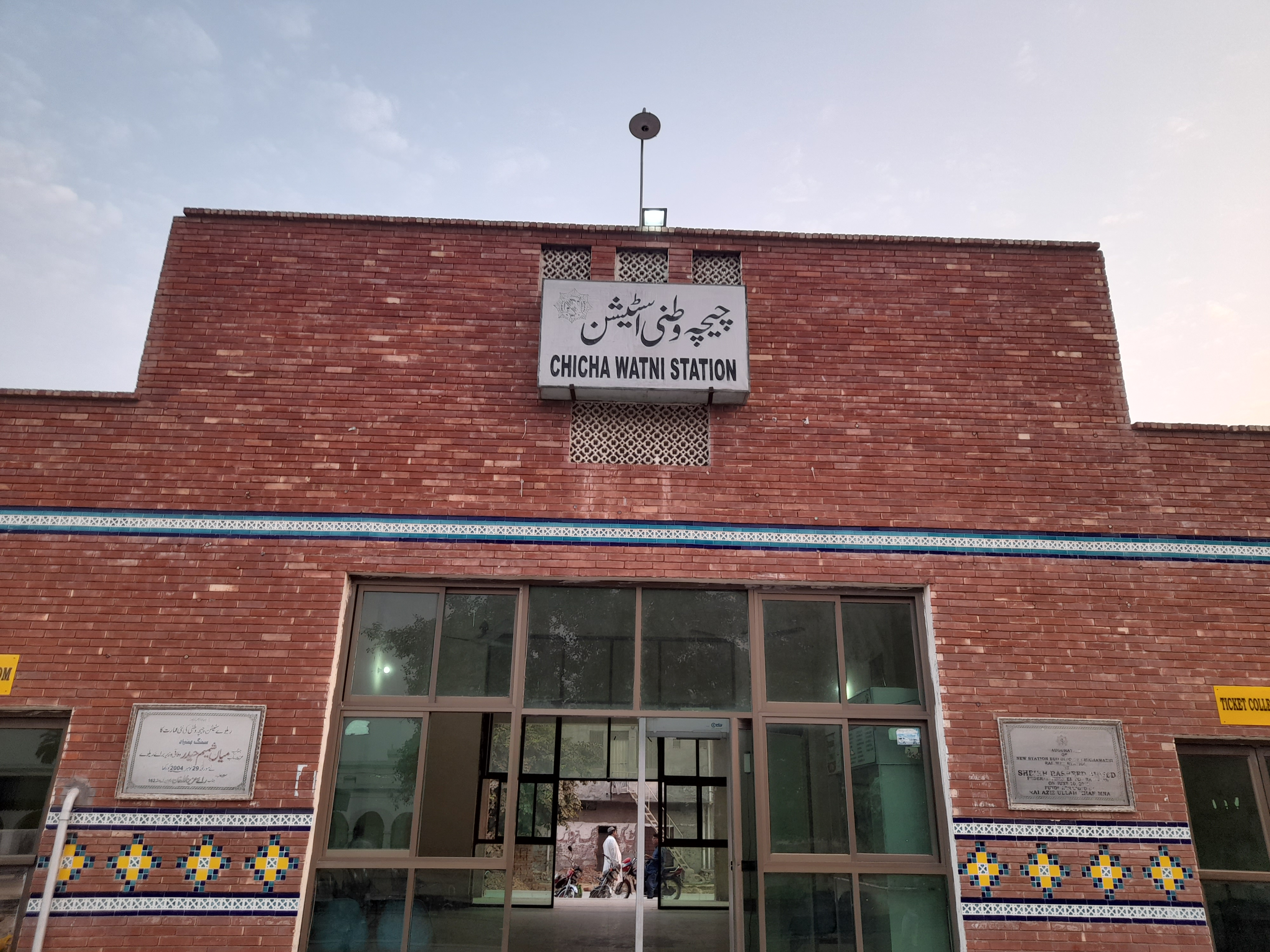
- From top, left to right: Chichawatni railway station (British-era building), Chichawatni Jungle, Chichawatni railway station (new building)

- Location within Punjab, Pakistan Location within Pakistan
- Coordinates: 30.32°N 72.42°E
- Country: Pakistan
- Province: Punjab
- District: Sahiwal
- Tehsil: Chichawatni

Government
  - Type: Municipal Committee
  - Chairman: Vacant
  - Vice-Chairman: Vacant
  - MNA: Muhammad Tufail

Population (2023 census)
  - City: 112,191
  - Rank: 115th in Pakistan
- Time zone: UTC+5 (PST)
- Calling code: 040
- Number of union councils: 3

Chichawatni (Punjabi: چیچا وطنی, Urdu: چِیچہ وطنى) is a city in the Sahiwal District of the Punjab province of Pakistan. It is the administrative center of Chichawatni Tehsil, one of the two tehsils of the district. Situated near the old main road called Grand Trunk Road, it lies approximately 45 kilometres (28 mi) from the district capital, Sahiwal. According to the 2023 census, Chichawatni's population was 112,191.

== History ==
From the beginning of the 7th century, Rajput Bhatti kingdoms dominated eastern portions of Pakistan and northern India. In 997 CE, Sultan Mahmud Ghaznavi, took over the Ghaznavid empire established by his father, Sultan Sebuktegin. In 1005, he conquered the Shahis in Kabul and followed it by the conquests of some of the western Punjab region.

Eastern regions of Punjab from Multan to Rawalpindi in the north (including present-day Faisalabad, previously called Lyallpur) remained under Rajput rule until 1193. The Delhi Sultanate and Mughal Empire later ruled the region.

The Punjab region became predominantly Muslim due to the missionary Sufi saints' work among the people of Punjab. Sufi dargahs (mausoleums) dot the landscape of Punjab region today. After the decline of the Mughal Empire, the Sikh Empire invaded and occupied Sahiwal District. During the British Raj, Chichawatni was reputedly transformed from a small Punjabi village into a relatively modern city by infrastructure investment and planning decrees, starting after the First World War.

During freedom struggle in 1857-1858, at Chichawatni (September) major (general later on) Crawford Chamberlain was besieged by a freedom fighter group led by Rai Ahmed Khan Kharal, and housed his cavalry in a caravanserai. He held out until he was relieved by a squadron of reinforcement reaching the place under Colonel Paton three days later. (Note: Wikipedia's article on Sahiwal District similarly describes this 1857 siege but names the relieving officer as "Colonel Paton," not John Lawrence.)

At the time of independence of Pakistan in 1947, most Indian Muslim families migrated from Punjab towns like Ludhiana, Jalandhar, Amritsar and Firozpur, and settled in towns like Chichawatni, shaping the city's present-day Muslim population. The predominantly Muslim population supported Muslim League and the Pakistan Movement.

After the independence of Pakistan in 1947, the minority Hindus and Sikhs migrated to India from the old northwestern Punjab areas, while the Muslim refugees from the northeastern Punjab areas of India migrated to the northwestern Punjab areas including to the Sahiwal District area as one of them, between the newly drawn national boundaries of Pakistan and India by the departing British.

In other words, old British Punjab province was divided into 2 new Punjabs – 'Muslim-majority Punjab' and 'Sikh and Hindu majority Punjab' in 1947. Chichawatni is also home to popular wedding halls located on the Grand Trunk Road. Chichawatni is a vast agricultural area producing, Cotton, Corn, Wheat and a vast variety of other fruits and vegetables.

== Overview ==
Chichawatni presently serves as the main city of Sahiwal Division, and is administratively subdivided into three City Union Councils and 34 rural Union Councils. It is also the headquarters of Chichawatni Tehsil. It lies approximately 20 kilometres (12 mi) from the ancient Upper Indus site of Harappa, a Unesco World Heritage Site, and is consequently a popular stop-over for tourists. It furthermore serves as the educational hub for many local villages, offering several colleges and institutions for higher education. Punjabi is the most-spoken language in Sahiwal, including Chichawatni, although Urdu is also commonly spoken.

=== Forest division ===
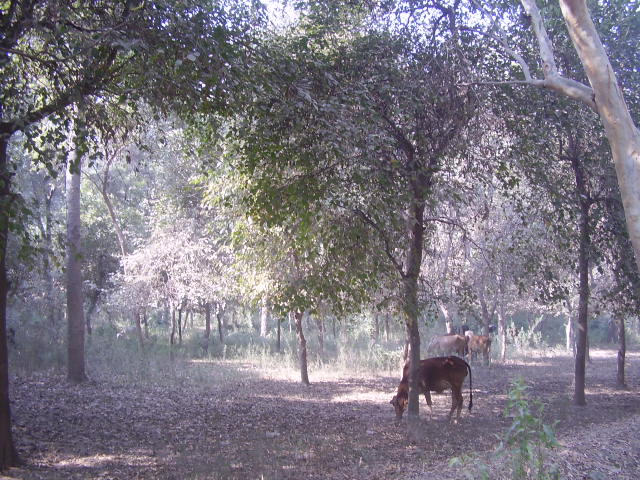
Forested land near Chichawatni

Chichawatni city is the headquarters of a Pakistani [[Protected and reserved forests of Pakistan|forest division]]. The local forested area is called Chichawatni Reserved Forest. During the War of Independence of 1857, local people fought against the British in this forest. In Second World War, many foreign prisoners were brought and confined here in this forest. Dating back to 1923, the Chichawatni Plantation covered a total forested area of approximately 3,600 hectares (9,000 acres), constituting the second-largest forest plantation in Pakistan, the largest being the 'Changa Manga Forest'. Two decades later, when these plants became trees, a unique resource was added to the biosphere in the form of honey. The Peregrine Fund, a U.S.-based avian conservation organisation, conducted research in Chichawatni's forests in the early 2000s.

=== Cattle market ===
Chichawatni's cattle market, known as Mandi Muwaishiyan, is among the largest in Pakistan. Typically, the market runs from the 21st of each month to the end of the month.

=== Kabaddi stadium ===
Kabaddi – a team sport similar to wrestling – is popular in Chichawatni, which is home to one of the few floodlit kabaddi stadiums in Pakistan. The town has played host to numerous kabaddi championships.

=== Rail links ===
In 1918, Chichawatni's first railway station was constructed, but its position, in the largely impassable forest to the north of the town, made it difficult to reach, despite the expansion of the station in 1927. In July 2007. A new and more accessible railway station was constructed in Chichawatni.

== Government investment ==
In recent years, the Government of Punjab has invested significantly into education in Chichawatni, leading to a rapid increase in the local literacy rate. In partnership with private interests, local authorities have also invested into ICT education, improving the computer skills of school and college students in Chichawatni. Numerous municipal parks and museums have also been constructed with government aid.

== Demographics ==
=== Population ===
Historical population
Year	Pop.	±%
1951	12,083	—
1961	21,380	+76.9%
1972	34,064	+59.3%
1981	50,241	+47.5%
1998	72,721	+44.7%
2017	94,733	+30.3%
2023	112,191	+18.4%

Languages

Languages of Chichawatni MC (2023 Census)
1. Punjabi (93.3%)
2. Urdu (5.80%)
3. Others (0.90%)

== See also ==
- Chichawatni railway station
- Forestry in Pakistan
