= July 2022 Punjab provincial by-election =

Elections in Pakistan

2022 Punjab provincial by-election
- 17 July 2022

20 of the 371 seats in the Provincial Assembly of the Punjab 186 seats needed for a majority
- Registered: 4,579,898 ▲
- Turnout: 49.71%
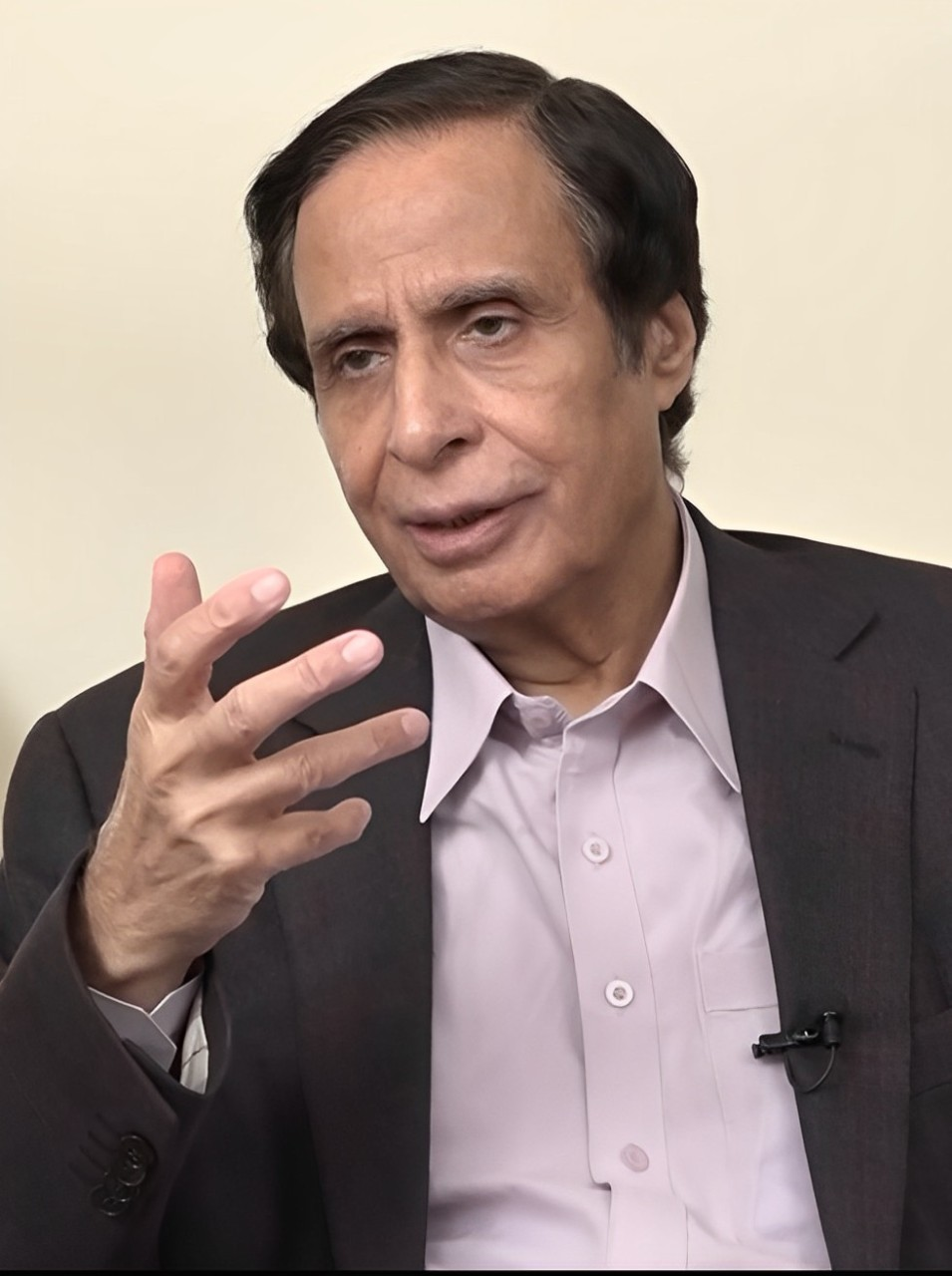

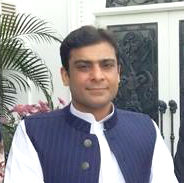
	First party	Second party
Leader	Parvez Elahi	Hamza Shahbaz
Party	PML(Q)	PML(N)
Alliance	PTI+	PDM
Leader's seat	Gujrat-III	Lahore-XXIII
Last election	8 seats, 31.82%	1 seat, 25.54%
Seats before	173	175
Seats won	15	4
Seats after	188	179
Seat change	▲15	▲4
Popular vote	1,049,183	883,632
Percentage	46.83%	39.44%
Swing	▲15.01	▲13.90
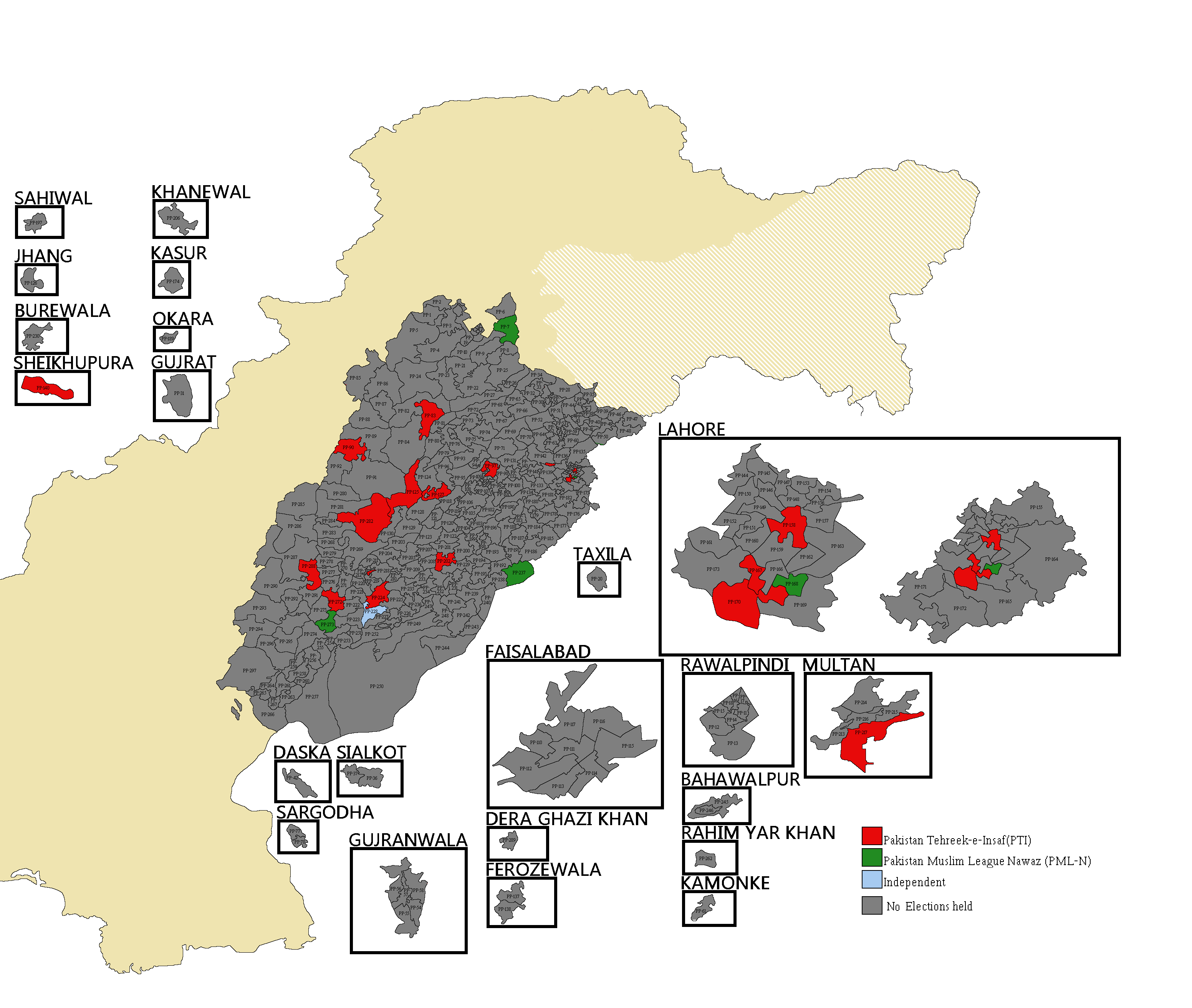
- Map of Punjab showing Assembly constituencies up for election
Chief Minister of Punjab (Pakistan) before election
Hamza Shahbaz
PML(N)
Elected Chief Minister
Chaudhry Pervaiz Elahi
PML(Q) (Note: Although Elahi was a part of the PML(Q), the majority of his support in the assembly was from the PTI, and all the 20 candidates nominated by the PTI-PML(Q) alliance in the constituencies were also members of the PTI.)

By-elections were held in Punjab, Pakistan on 17 July 2022 to elect 20 members of the Provincial Assembly of the Punjab. The Pakistan Tehreek-e-Insaf won a landslide victory on 15 of those 20 seats, leading to the collapse of Chief Minister Hamza Shahbaz's PML(N)-led coalition government, as it became 7 seats short of a majority.

The by-elections were held on these seats: PP-7 (Rawalpindi-II), PP-83 (Khushab-II), PP-90 (Bhakkar-II), PP-97 (Faisalabad-I), PP-125 (Jhang-II), PP-127 (Jhang-IV), PP-140 (Sheikhupura-VI), PP-158 (Lahore-XV), PP-167 (Lahore-XXIV), PP-168 (Lahore-XXV), PP-170 (Lahore-XXVII), PP-202 (Sahiwal-VII), PP-217 (Multan-VII), PP-224 (Lodhran-I), PP-228 (Lodhran-V), PP-237 (Bahawalnagar-I), PP-272 (Muzaffargarh-V), PP-273 (Muzaffargarh-VI), PP-282 (Layyah-III) and PP-288 (Dera Ghazi Khan-IV).

In the 2018 election, 11 of these seats were won by Independents, 8 were won by candidates on the PTI-ticket, and 1 by a PML(N) candidate; the 11 independents all subsequently joined the PTI and the PML(N) seat was won by the PTI in a December 2018 by-election. The by-elections were triggered after these 20 PTI MPAs voted in favor of the opposition candidate belonging to the PML(N), Hamza Shahbaz, to become the Chief Minister of Punjab, which, according to the Supreme Court and the Election Commission of Pakistan, violated Article 63-A of the Constitution of Pakistan which concerns party defections.

== Background ==
After the 2018 Provincial Elections, Pakistan Tehreek-e-Insaf (PTI) won 159 seats and Pakistan Muslim League (N) (PML(N)) won 164 seats. Soon after, 25 out of 30 Independents joined PTI, but it was still 2 seats short of a majority of 186. Pakistan Muslim League (Q) (PML(Q)) with 10 seats formed alliance with PTI. PTI was able to form government in Punjab.

During a political crisis in Pakistan after the successful no-confidence motion against Prime Minister Imran Khan, another motion of no confidence was filed against Chief Minister Usman Buzdar, as well as against Chaudhry Pervaiz Elahi and Dost Muhammad Mazari, the Speaker and Deputy Speaker of the Provincial Assembly, respectively. Buzdar resigned before a vote on the motion of no confidence could be held and as a consequence, an election for a new Chief Minister was scheduled on 16 April between PML(N)'s Hamza Shahbaz, the joint candidate of the Pakistan Democratic Movement, and PML(Q)'s Chaudhry Pervaiz Elahi, the joint candidate of his party and PTI. On the day of the election, 25 PTI MPAs crossed the floor to support Shahbaz, violating party policy. During the very beginning of the Assembly session on 16 April, a riot began between PTI and PML-N supporters. PTI MPAs threw ewers at the Deputy Speaker, as well as slapping him. The police entered the Assembly for the first time in its history and arrested 3 MPAs. The Deputy Speaker then presided over the Assembly session in the visitors gallery and declared Shahbaz the winner by securing 197 votes.

After the floor crossing, the Election Commission of Pakistan (ECP) de-seated 25 dissident PTI MPAs for defection in the light of Article 63-A of the Constitution of the Islamic Republic of Pakistan on 20 May 2022. Five of these MPAs were elected on reserved seats (three for women and two for minorities) and new PTI MPAs were notified on these seats on 7 July.

The ECP announced on 25 May 2022 that the by-elections would be held on 17 July 2022. The government held 177 seats in the assembly. This included 165 PML(N) MPAs, 7 PPP MPAs, 1 PRHP MPA, and 4 independent MPAs. Therefore, they needed to win 9 seats to gain a majority in the assembly. On the other hand, the opposition held 173 seats. This included 163 PTI MPAs and 10 PML(Q) MPAs. Therefore, they needed to win 13 seats to gain a majority in the assembly.

== Candidates ==
A total number of 330 candidates filed nominations for the 20 constituencies. The major contest was between Pakistan Tehreek-e-Insaf and Pakistan Muslim League (N). The Pakistan Peoples Party (PPP) withdrew its candidates in favor of PML(N) whereas PML-Q withdrew its candidates in favor of PTI.

The nominations of 175 candidates were accepted from across Punjab and they contested in these by-elections. 3,131 Polling Stations were created in 20 Constituencies out of which 731 were for men, 700 for women, and 1700 were combined polling stations. The ECP declared 1304 polling stations sensitive and 690 highly sensitive. All polling stations from the 4 constituencies of Lahore and the constituency of Multan were declared sensitive.

No	District	Constituency	Candidates	Registered voters
1	Rawalpindi	PP-7	6	335,295
2	Khushab	PP-83	10	322,428
3	Bhakkar	PP-90	9	248,960
4	Faisalabad	PP-97	12	255,884
5	Jhang	PP-125	10	251,571
6	Jhang	PP-127	10	234,596
7	Sheikhupura	PP-140	10	241,598
8	Lahore	PP-158	14	236,394
9	Lahore	PP-167	11	220,348
10	Lahore	PP-168	10	151,484
11	Lahore	PP-170	8	114,652
12	Sahiwal	PP-202	8	233,079
13	Multan	PP-217	4	216,996
14	Lodhran	PP-224	10	232,173
15	Lodhran	PP-228	6	226,088
16	Bahawalnagar	PP-237	6	225,341
17	Muzaffargarh	PP-272	9	203,567
18	Muzaffargarh	PP-273	6	225,200
19	Layyah	PP-282	10	202,249
20	Dera Ghazi Khan	PP-288	6	201,995
Total		20	175	4,579,898

== Results ==
Vote Share of different parties in the election.
1. PTI (46.8%)
2. PML-N (39.4%)
3. TLP (5.54%)
4. JI (0.34%)
5. IND & OTH (7.85%)
Seat Share of different parties in the election.
1. PTI (75.0%)
2. PML-N (20.0%)
3. IND (5.00%)

Party	Votes		Seats		
Party	No.	%	Contested	Won	+/−
PTI	1,049,183	46.83	20	15	▼5
PMLN	883,632	39.44	20	4	▲4
TLP	124,035	5.54	19	0	Steady
JI	7,634	0.34	9	0	Steady
Others & Independents	175,981	7.85	107	1	▲1
Total Valid votes	2,240,465	98.41			
Invalid/Rejected	36,285	1.59			
Total	2,276,750	100	175	20	
Registered voters/Turnout	4,579,898	49.71			
Source: Election Commission of Pakistan

=== Result by Constituency ===
District	Assembly Constituency	Winner				Runner-up				Margin	Turnout %
District	Assembly Constituency	Candidate	Party	Votes	%	Candidate	Party	Votes	%	Margin	Turnout %
Rawalpindi	PP-7 Rawalpindi	Raja Sagheer Ahmed	PML(N)	68,906	43.29	Muhammad Shabbir Awan	PTI	68,857	43.27	49	47.46
Khushab	PP-83 Khushab	Hasan Aslam Awan	PTI	50,749	32.90	Muhammad Asif Malik	IND	43,587	28.26	7,162	47.84
Bhakkar	PP-90 Bhakkar	Irfan Ullah Khan Niazi	PTI	77,865	47.48	Saeed Akbar Khan Niwani	PML(N)	66,513	40.56	11,352	65.86
Faisalabad	PP-97 Faisalabad	Ali Afzal Sahi	PTI	67,022	50.08	Muhammad Ajmal Cheema	PML(N)	54,266	40.55	12,756	52.30
Jhang	PP-125 Jhang	Mian Muhammad Azam Cheela	PTI	82,297	55.59	Faisal Hayat Jabboana	PML(N)	52,277	35.31	30,020	58.84
Jhang	PP-127 Jhang	Mehar Muhammad Nawaz	PTI	71,648	56.87	Mehar Muhammad Aslam Bharwana	PML(N)	47,413	37.63	24,235	53.71
Sheikhupura	PP-140 Sheikhupura	Khurram Shahzad Virk	PTI	50,166	51.09	Mian Khalid Mehmood	PML(N)	32,105	32.69	18,061	40.65
Lahore	PP-158 Lahore	Mian Muhammad Akram Usman	PTI	37,463	49.02	Rana Ahsan Sharafat	PML(N)	31,906	41.75	5,557	32.33
Lahore	PP-167 Lahore	Shabbir Gujjar	PTI	40,511	54.78	Nazir Ahmed Chohan	PML(N)	26,473	35.80	14,038	33.56
Lahore	PP-168 Lahore	Malik Asad Ali Khokhar	PML(N)	26,169	53.11	Malik Nawaz Awan	PTI	15,768	32.00	10,401	32.53
Lahore	PP-170 Lahore	Malik Zaheer Abbas	PTI	24,688	53.37	Muhammad Amin Zulqarnain	PML(N)	17,519	37.88	7,169	40.34
Sahiwal	PP-202 Sahiwal	Muhammad Gulam Sarwar	PTI	62,298	47.89	Nauman Ahmad Langrial	PML(N)	59,191	45.50	3,107	55.81
Multan	PP-217 Multan	Zain Qureshi	PTI	47,349	51.76	Salman Naeem	PML(N)	40,425	44.19	6,924	42.16
Lodhran	PP-224 Lodhran	Amir Iqbal Shah	PTI	69,881	52.61	Zawar Hussain Warraich	PML(N)	56,214	42.32	13,667	57.21
Lodhran	PP-228 Lodhran	Syed Rafi Uddin	IND	45,020	35.63	Izzat Javaid Khan	PTI	38,338	30.34	6,682	55.88
Bahawalnagar	PP-237 Bahawalnagar	Mian Fida Hussain Wattoo	PML(N)	66,881	54.09	Aftab Mehmood	PTI	31,148	25.19	35,733	54.87
Muzaffargarh	PP-272 Muzaffargarh	Muhammad Moazam Ali Khan Jatoi	PTI	46,069	44.04	Zehra Basit Bukhari	PML(N)	36,401	34.80	9,668	51.38
Muzaffargarh	PP-273 Muzaffargarh	Syed Muhammad Sibtain Raza	PML(N)	59,679	49.78	Yasir Khan Jatoi	PTI	51,232	42.74	8,447	53.23
Layyah	PP-282 Layyah	Qaisar Abbas Khan Magsi	PTI	57,718	47.93	Muhammad Tahir Randhawa	PML(N)	38,758	32.19	18,960	59.54
Dera Ghazi Khan	PP-288 Dera Ghazi Khan	Muhammad Saif-ud-Din Khosa	PTI	58,116	59.75	Abdul Qadir Khan Khosa	PML(N)	32,212	33.12	25,904	48.15

=== Constituency-wise Detailed Result ===
Detailed results of each constituency are as follows:

==== PP-7 Rawalpindi ====
2022 Punjab provincial by-election: PP-7 Rawalpindi-II
Party	Candidate	Votes	%	±%
PML(N)	Raja Sagheer Ahmed	68,918	43.29	
PTI	Muhammad Shabbir Awan	68,863	43.27	▲
TLP	Manzoor Zahoor	14,776	9.28	▼
JI	Tanveer Ahmed	1,666	1.05	▼
IND	2 candidates	3,436	2.15	▼
Majority		55	0.02	▼
Rejected ballots		1,475	0.95	
Turnout		1,59,143	47.46	▲

==== PP-83 Khushab ====
2022 Punjab provincial by-election: PP-83 Khushab-II
Party	Candidate	Votes	%	±%
PTI	Hasan Aslam Awan	50,749	32.90	
IND	Muhammad Asif Malik	43,587	28.26	▼
PML(N)	Ameer Haider Sangha	35,395	22.94	▼
IND	Malik Hamid Mehmood Tiwana	11,533	7.47	▼
TLP	Zamurd Abbas Khan	8,766	5.69	▼
IND	5 Candidates	2,124	1.38	▼
Majority		7,162	4.64	▲
Rejected ballots		2,114	1.37	
Turnout		1,54,265	47.84	▲

==== PP-90 Bhakkar ====
2022 Punjab provincial by-election: PP-90 Bhakkar-I
Party	Candidate	Votes	%	±%
PTI	Irfan Ullah Khan Niazi	77,865	47.48	
PML(N)	Saeed Akbar Khan Niwani	66,513	40.56	▼
IND	Azfar Ali	9,151	5.58	▲
TLP	Muhammad Ajmal Jamil	3,270	1.99	▼
JUI-F	Abdul Rauf	2,799	1.71	▼
JI	Naveed Ahsan Niyaz	576	0.35	▼
IND	3 Candidates	929	0.57	▲
Majority		11,352	6.92	▲
Rejected ballots		2,873	1.75	
Turnout		1,63,976	65.86	▲

==== PP-97 Faisalabad ====
2022 Punjab provincial by-election: PP-97 Faisalabad-I
Party	Candidate	Votes	%	±%
PTI	Ali Afzal Sahi	67,022	50.08	▲19.34
PML(N)	Muhammad Ajmal Cheema	54,266	40.55	▲12.10
TLP	Naveed Shafi	7,696	5.75	▲2.16
IND	Tariq Mehmood	1,651	1.23	
JI	Sajid Ismail	966	0.72	
PNP	Shoaib Aslam	229	0.17	
IND	6 Candidates	507	0.38	▲
Majority		12,756	9.53	▲
Rejected ballots		1,482	1.11	
Turnout		1,33,819	52.30	▲

==== PP-125 Jhang ====
2022 Punjab provincial by-election: PP-125 Jhang-II
Party	Candidate	Votes	%	±%
PTI	Mian Muhammad Azam Cheela	82,297	55.59	
PML(N)	Faisal Hayat Jabboana	52,277	35.31	▼
IND	8 Candidates	10,113	6.83	▼
Majority		30,020	20.28	▲
Rejected ballots		3,348	2.26	
Turnout		1,48,035	58.84	▲

==== PP-127 Jhang ====
2022 Punjab provincial by-election: PP-127 Jhang-IV
Party	Candidate	Votes	%	±%
PTI	Mehar Muhammad Nawaz	71,648	56.87	
PML(N)	Mehar Muhammad Aslam Bharwana	47,413	37.63	▼
TLP	Muhammad Usman	2,843	2.26	▼
IND	7 Candidates	1,501	1.19	▼
Majority		24,235	19.24	▲
Rejected ballots		2,707	2.15	
Turnout		1,25,996	53.71	▲

==== PP-140 Sheikhupura ====
2022 Punjab provincial by-election: PP-140 Sheikhupura-I
Party	Candidate	Votes	%	±%
PTI	Khurram Shahzad Virk	50,166	51.09	
PML(N)	Mian Khalid Mehmood	32,105	32.69	▼
TLP	Javed Iqbal	14,032	14.29	▼
IND	Ali Bashir	655	0.67	▲
JI	Muhammad Tauseef	251	0.26	▼
IND	5 Candidates	291	0.30	▲
Majority		18,061	18.39	▲
Rejected ballots		702	0.72	
Turnout		98,202	40.65	▲

==== PP-158 Lahore ====
2022 Punjab provincial by-election: PP-158 Lahore-XV
Party	Candidate	Votes	%	±%
PTI	Mian Akram Usman	37,463	49.02	
PML(N)	Rana Ahsan Sharafat	31,906	41.75	▼
TLP	Muhammad Bilal	5,632	7.37	▼
JI	Umair Awan	569	0.75	▼
PNP	Jamil ur Rehman	114	0.15	▼
IND	8 Candidates	201	0.26	▼
ANP	Zahid Khan	21	0.03	▼
Majority		5,557	7.27	▲
Rejected ballots		516	0.68	
Turnout		76,422	32.33	▲

==== PP-167 Lahore ====
2022 Punjab provincial by-election: PP-167 Lahore-XXIV
Party	Candidate	Votes	%	±%
PTI	Shabbir Gujjar	40,511	54.78	
PML(N)	Nazir Ahmad Chohan	26,473	35.80	▼
TLP	Hasnain Ahmed Shezad	4,536	6.13	▼
JI	Khalid Ahmed	1,665	2.25	▼
IND	1 TJP and 6 Ind candidates	133	0.18	▲
Majority		14,038	18.98	▲
Rejected ballots		640	0.87	
Turnout		73,948	33.56	▲

==== PP-168 Lahore ====
2022 Punjab provincial by-election: PP-168 Lahore-XXV
Party	Candidate	Votes	%	±%
PML(N)	Malik Asad Ali Khokhar	26,169	53.11	
PTI	Malik Nawaz Awan	15,768	32.00	▲
TLP	Amjad Hussain Abbasi	6,246	12.68	▼
JI	Usman Ghani	222	0.45	▼
IND	6 candidates	365	0.74	▲
Majority		10,401	21.11	▲
Rejected ballots		502	1.02	
Turnout		49,272	32.53	▼

==== PP-170 Lahore ====
2022 Punjab provincial by-election: PP-170 Lahore-XXVII
Party	Candidate	Votes	%	±%
PTI	Malik Zaheer Abbas	24,688	53.37	
PML(N)	Muhammad Amin Zulqernain	17,519	37.88	▼
TLP	Jamil Ahmed	1728	3.74	▼
JI	Waqas Ahmed Butt	1446	3.13	▼
IND	4 candidates	324	0.7	▲
Majority		7,169	15.50	▲
Rejected ballots		546	1.18	
Turnout		46,251	40.34	▲

==== PP-202 Sahiwal ====
2022 Punjab provincial by-election: PP-202 Sahiwal-VII
Party	Candidate	Votes	%	±%
PTI	Major (R) Ghulam Sarwar	62,298	47.89	
PML(N)	Nauman Ahmad Langrial	59,191	45.50	▼
TLP	Umair Saleem	5,222	4.01	▼
IND	5 candidates	1,412	1.08	▼
Majority		3,107	2.39	▲
Rejected ballots		1,970	1.51	
Turnout		1,30,093	55.81	▲

==== PP-217 Multan ====
2022 Punjab provincial by-election: PP-217 Multan-VII
Party	Candidate	Votes	%	±%
PTI	Zain Qureshi	47,349	51.76	
PML(N)	Muhammad Salman Naeem	40,425	44.19	▼
TLP	Zahid Hameed Gujjar	2,489	2.72	▼
JI	Sajid Ismail	273	0.30	▼
Majority		6,924	7.57	▲
Rejected ballots		943	1.03	
Turnout		91,479	42.16	▲

==== PP-224 Lodhran ====
2022 Punjab provincial by-election: PP-224 Lodhran-I
Party	Candidate	Votes	%	±%
PTI	Muhammad Aamir Iqbal Shah	69,881	52.61	
PML(N)	Zawar Hussain Warraich	56,214	42.32	▼
TLP	Intezar Ahmed Attari	3,525	2.65	▼
IND	6 candidates	1,232	0.93	▼
JUI-F	Hafiz Abdul Shakoor	97	0.07	▼
Majority		13,667	10.28	▲
Rejected ballots		2,080	1.57	
Turnout		1,32,831	57.21	▲

==== PP-228 Lodhran ====
2022 Punjab provincial by-election: PP-228 Lodhran-V
Party	Candidate	Votes	%	±%
Independent	Syed Rafi Uddin	45,020	35.63	
PTI	Ezat Javaid Khan	38,338	30.34	▼
PML(N)	Nazir Ahmad Khan	34,929	27.65	▼
TLP	Arshad Ali Shah	4,735	3.75	▼
IND	2 Independents	1,311	1.04	▼
Majority		6,682	5.29	▲
Rejected ballots		2,015	1.60	
Turnout		1,26,348	55.88	▲

==== PP-237 Bahawalnagar ====
2022 Punjab provincial by-election: PP-237 Bahawalnagar-I
Party	Candidate	Votes	%	±%
PML(N)	Mian Fida Hussain Wattoo	66,881	54.09	
PTI	Aftab Mehmood	31,148	25.19	▼
TLP	Mian Rashid Mehmood Watto	21,538	17.42	▼
IND	1 PTIN and 2 Independents	1,548	1.25	▼
Majority		35,733	28.90	▲
Rejected ballots		2,526	2.04	
Turnout		1,23,641	54.87	▲

==== PP-272 Muzaffargarh ====
2022 Punjab provincial by-election: PP-272 Muzaffargarh-V
Party	Candidate	Votes	%	±%
PTI	Muhammad Moazam Ali Khan Jatoi	46,069	44.04	
PML(N)	Zehra Basit Bukhari	36,401	34.80	▼
IND	Zarina Kausar	7,074	6.76	▲
IND	Haroon Ahmed Sultan	6,962	6.66	▲
TLP	Muhammad Ibrahim	4,360	4.17	▼
IND	4 Candidates	1,020	0.98	▲
Majority		9,668	9.24	▲
Rejected ballots		2,707	2.59	
Turnout		1,04,593	51.38	▲

==== PP-273 Muzaffargarh ====
2022 Punjab provincial by-election: PP-273 Muzaffargarh-VI
Party	Candidate	Votes	%	±%
PML(N)	Syed Muhammad Sibtain Raza	59,679	49.78	
PTI	Yasir Khan Jatoi	51,232	42.74	▼
TLP	Muhammad Shafi Khan	5,053	4.22	▼
IND	1 PPPSb and 2 Independents	1,053	0.88	▼
Majority		8,447	7.05	▲
Rejected ballots		2,858	2.38	
Turnout		1,19,875	53.23	▲

==== PP-282 Layyah ====
2022 Punjab provincial by-election: PP-282 Layyah-III
Party	Candidate	Votes	%	±%
PTI	Qaisar Abbas Khan Magsi	57,718	47.93	
PML(N)	Muhammad Tahir Randhawa	38,758	32.19	▼
IND	Muhammad Riaz	16,193	13.45	▲
TLP	Muhammad Shahid Iqbal	4,319	3.59	▼
IND	6 Candidates	1,592	1.32	▲
Majority		18,960	15.75	▲
Rejected ballots		2,437	2.02	
Turnout		1,20,417	59.54	▲

==== PP-288 Dera Ghazi Khan ====
2022 Punjab provincial by-election: PP-288 Dera Ghazi Khan-IV
Party	Candidate	Votes	%	±%
PTI	Muhammad Saif-ud-Din Khosa	58,116	59.75	
PML(N)	Abdul Qadir Khosa	32,212	33.12	▼
TLP	Irfan Ullah	3,270	3.36	▼
IND	3 Candidates	1,816	1.87	▼
Majority		25,904	26.63	▲
Rejected ballots		1,803	1.85	
Turnout		97,267	48.15	▲

== Aftermath ==
In the aftermath of the by-election, it was claimed that PTI MPA from PP-257 (Rahim Yar Khan-II), Chaudhry Masood Ahmad had become a turncoat after his loyalty was allegedly bought, whereafter he soon fled to Turkey. Allegations of rigging were also put forward by PTI in the PP-7 (Rawalpindi-II) constituency, where the PML(N) candidate emerged as the victor with a margin of 49 votes. A plea for a recount was also presented, which was subsequently rejected by the ECP. 2 PML(N) MPAs, Faisal Niazi from PP-209 (Khanewal-VII) and Jaleel Ahmed Sharaqpuri from PP-139 (Sheikhupura-V), also resigned from their seats before the election for Chief Minister.

== Election for Chief Minister ==
The election for Chief Minister took place on 22 July 2022 among members of the Provincial Assembly. Controversially, the votes of ten PML(Q) MPAs were rejected by Deputy Speaker Dost Muhammad Mazari, citing an interpretation of Article 63A of the Constitution and a letter from the leader Shujaat Hussain stating he had "issued directions to all my provincial members to cast their votes in favour of Muhammad Hamza Shahbaz Sharif". This resulted in a majority of valid votes, 179, for Hamza Shahbaz to Pervaiz Elahi's 176. Article 63A states:

63A.

(1) If a member of a Parliamentary Party composed of a single political party in a House— (a) resigns from membership of his political party or joins another Parliamentary party; or (b) votes or abstains from voting in the House contrary to any direction issued by the Parliamentary Party to which he belongs, in relation to— (i) election of the Prime Minister or the Chief Minister; or (ii) a vote of confidence or a vote of no-confidence; or (iii) a Money Bill or a Constitution (Amendment) Bill; he may be declared in writing by the Party Head to have defected from the political party, and the Party Head may forward a copy of the declaration to the Presiding Officer and the Chief Election Commissioner and shall similarly forward a copy thereof to the member concerned : Provided that before making the declaration, the Party Head shall provide such member with an opportunity to show cause as to why such declaration may not be made against him.

Explanation―Party Head means any person, by whatever name called, declared as such by the Party.

(2) A member of a House shall be deemed to be a member of a Parliamentary Party if he, having been elected as a candidate or nominee of a political party which constitutes the Parliamentary Party in the House or, having been elected otherwise than as a candidate or nominee of a political party, has become a member of such Parliamentary Party after such election by means of a declaration in writing.

The PTI filed a petition with the Supreme Court of Pakistan, stating that as PML(Q) leader Hussain was not a member of the Punjab Assembly, he did not have the authority to make the decision to back Shahbaz under section 2 of the constitutional article cited, as only the Parliamentary Party has the authority to decide which candidate its members are to vote for. Additionally, under a 17 May Supreme Court ruling, although defecting lawmakers' votes will not be counted for purposes of voting in Article 63A, section 1, subsection b, none of the 10 PML(Q) members had been deemed to have defected, as that would have required a letter stating as such from the leader, which was Shujaat Hussain. As a consequence of the court proceedings, Shahbaz was made a “trustee Chief Minister” until the three-judge bench of Chief Justice Umar Ata Bandial, Justice Munib Akhtar, and Justice Ijaz-ul-Ahsan, could reach a decision.

The bench ruled on 26 July that the Deputy Speaker's ruling was unconstitutional and that Chaudhry Pervaiz Elahi would be sworn in as the Chief Minister of Punjab.

Punjab, Pakistan Chief Ministerial Election, 22 July 2022
Candidate	Party	Supporting Parties	Votes Obtained
Required majority →			186 out of 371
Pervaiz Elahi	PML(Q)	PTI	186
Hamza Shahbaz	PML(N)	PPP, PRHP, Independents	179
