= Wattoo =

Surname in Punjab, Pakistan

- Jāti: Rajput, Jat
- Religions: Islam
- Languages: Punjabi
- Country: Pakistan
- Region: Punjab
- Ethnicity: Punjabi
- Family names: yes

Wattoo, also spelled Wattu, is a Punjabi Muslim clan mainly residing in the Bar region of Punjab, Pakistan. Many identify as Muslim Rajputs and claim descent from the Bhatti clan. The Jawahir-i-Faridi also lists the Wattoos as one of the Jat clans which were converted by Baba Farid.

== Notable people ==
with the surname Wattoo include:

- Manzoor Wattoo
- Yasin Wattoo
- Bushra Bibi
- Moazzam Jahanzeb Wattoo
- Abdul Ghaffar Wattoo
- Khadim Hussain Wattoo
- Mian Fida Hussain Wattoo
- Muhammad Moeen Wattoo
