= Samote =

Pakistani town

Samote سموٹ
- Town
- Location within Punjab, Pakistan Location within Pakistan
- Coordinates: 33°20′7″N 73°29′45″E
- Country: Pakistan
- Province: Punjab
- District: Rawalpindi
- Tehsil: Kallar Syedan
- UC: Samote
- Time zone: UTC+5 (PST)
- Postcode (ZIP): 47490
- Area code: 051

Samote is a Town and Capital of Union Council Samote, Tehsil Kallar Syedan, District Rawalpindi Samote is located 20 kilometres (12 mi) from Kallar Syedan, 60 kilometres (37 mi) from Rawalpindi City, 70 kilometres (43 mi) from Islamabad, 31 kilometres (19 mi) from Dadyal (in Azad Kashmir), 22 kilometres (14 mi) from Gujar Khan. In 2008 General Elections, Samote was under, NA-50 for National Assembly and PP-2 (now PP-7) for Punjab Assembly. In 2013 Elections, Samote remained under administration of same constituencies. In Next 2018 General Elections, Samote was shifted to NA-58 of National Assembly and PP-7 of Punjab Assembly.

For the Next 2024 General elections, Samote is listed under NA-51 a newly created constituency of National Assembly but remains under the same PP-7 of Provincial Assembly.

== Languages ==
- Pothwari: 90%
- Urdu 5%
- Pashto 3%
- Other 2%

== Schools and colleges ==
- Haqani Public School & College Samote
- Government Boys Higher Secondary School Samote
- Government Girls Higher Secondary School Samote
- Misali Public High School Samote

== Hospitals ==
- Government hospital samote.
- Govt Veternary Hospital Samote.

== Landmarks ==
Following are some of the important landmarks and important Government buildings situated in the town of samote.

- Markazi Jamia Mosque Samote
- Post Office Samote affiliated with (Pakistan Post).
- Union Council Office Samote

== Notable people Born in Samote Union Council ==
- Dada Amir Haider Khan - Communist leader of undivided India and later Pakistan
- Sub Amanat Hussain - Ex Chairman Union Council Samote
- Sir Khizer Hussain - Teatcher and Social Worker of Samote
- Ch Muhammad Akram - Ex Chairman Union Council Samote
- Ch Muhammad Khalid (late) - Ex MPA PP-7 Punjab Assembly Pakistan Peoples Party (1988–1997)
- Lt. Col (R) Muhammad Shabbir Awan, ex MPA PP2 Punjab Assembly Col Shabbir Awan joined PTI on 19 December 2013

== Banks ==
- A branch of United Bank Limited
- A branch of Bank Al-Habib Limited

== Transport ==
Samote is well connected to nearby cities, towns and villages by roads and local transport that runs on these roads. A Local Suzuki Ravi service is available that runs from samote to nearby town Bewal. Also Toyota Hiace Services run through the town connecting it with cities like Kallar Syedan and Rawalpindi and even the Azad Kashmiri city of Dadyal
