= PP-225 Lodhran-I =

Constituency of the Punjabi Provincial Legislature, Pakistan

PP-225 Lodhran-II
- Constituency for the Provincial Assembly of Punjab
- Region: Dunyapur Tehsil (partly) including Dunyapur town and Kahror Pacca Tehsil (partly) of Lodhran District

Current constituency
- Created from: PP-208 Lodhran-II (2002-2018); PP-224 Lodhran-I and PP-225 Lodhran-II (2018-2023)

PP-225 Lodhran-I (پی پی-225، لودهراں-1) is a Constituency of Provincial Assembly of Punjab.

== General elections 2024 ==
Provincial election 2024: PP-225 Lodhran-I
Party	Candidate	Votes	%	±%
Independent	Shazia Hayyat (Note: Filed nomination papers as PTI candidate but ECP allowed him to run as an Independent)	69,799	45.86	
PML(N)	Zawar Hussain Warraich	62,698	41.2	
TLP	Muhammad Yousaf	7,398	4.86	
PPP	Aftab Ali Babar	6,476	4.26	
Independent	Muhammad Saleem Akhter	2,669	1.75	
Others	Others (thirteen candidates)	3,156	2.07	
Turnout		156,147	57.77	
Total valid votes		152,196	97.47	
Rejected ballots		3,951	2.53	
Majority		7,101	4.66	
Registered electors		270,269		
hold				

== General elections 2018 ==
Provincial election 2018: PP-225 Lodhran-II
Party	Candidate	Votes	%	±%
PML(N)	Peerzada Muhammad Jahangir Bhutta	40,316	36.69	
PTI	Tahir Hussain Khan	38,767	35.28	
Independent	Sohail Khursheed Khan Kanju	11,563	10.52	
TLP	Syed Bagh Ali Shah	10,134	9.22	
PPP	Muhammad Iqbal	4,772	4.34	
Independent	Aftab Ali Babar	3,519	3.20	
Others	Others (two candidates)	805	0.73	
Turnout		113,730	61.79	
Total valid votes		109,876	96.61	
Rejected ballots		3,854	3.39	
Majority		1,549	1.41	
Registered electors		184,049		

== General elections 2013 ==
Provincial election 2013: PP-208 Lodhran-II
Party	Candidate	Votes	%	±%
Independent	Pirzada Muhammad Jhangir Sultan	28,723	32.77	
PML(N)	Tahir Hussain Khan	20,010	22.83	
PTI	Muhammad Raza Shah	17,061	19.47	
Independent	Mumtaz Hussain Balouch	7,627	8.70	
PPP	Rana Muhammad Anwar Saleem	6,714	7.66	
Independent	Ali Raza Khan Kanju	5,020	5.73	
Others	Others (thirteen candidates)	2,488	2.84	
Turnout		91,418	64.99	
Total valid votes		87,643	95.87	
Rejected ballots		3,775	4.13	
Majority		8,713	9.94	
Registered electors		140,674		

== See also ==
- PP-224 Multan-XII
- PP-226 Lodhran-II
