= Muhammad Aamir Iqbal Shah =

Pakistani politician

Member of the Provincial Assembly of the Punjab
- In office 18 July 2022 – 14 January 2023
- Preceded by: Zawar Hussain Warraich
- Constituency: PP-224 Lodhran-I
- In office 29 May 2013 – 31 May 2018
- Succeeded by: Zawar Hussain Warraich
- Constituency: PP-207 (Lodhran-I)

Personal details
- Born: 15 November 1978 (age 47) Lodhran, Punjab, Pakistan
- Party: PTI (2022-present)
- Other political affiliations: PMLN (2013-2018)
- Parent: Muhammad Iqbal Shah (father)

Muhammad Aamir Iqbal Shah is a Pakistani politician, who served as a Member of the Provincial Assembly of the Punjab from July 2022 till January 2023. He also served in this position from 2002 to 2007 and again from May 2013 to May 2018.

== Early life and education ==
He was born on 15 November 1978 in Lodhran to Muhammad Iqbal Shah.

He graduated from Bahauddin Zakariya University in 1997 and has the degree of Bachelor of Arts.

== Political career ==
He was elected to the Provincial Assembly of the Punjab as a candidate of the Pakistan Muslim League (Q) (PML-Q) from PP-207 (Lodhran-I) in the 2002 Punjab provincial election. He received 44,149 votes and defeated a candidate of the Pakistan Peoples Party (PPP).

He ran for the seat of the Provincial Assembly of the Punjab as a candidate of the PML-Q from PP-207 (Lodhran-I) in the 2008 Punjab provincial election but was unsuccessful. He received 22,519 votes and lost the seat to a candidate of the PPP.

He was re-elected to the Provincial Assembly of the Punjab as a candidate of the Pakistan Muslim League (N) (PML(N)) from PP-207 (Lodhran-I) in the 2013 Punjab provincial election.

He was re-elected to the Provincial Assembly of Punjab as a candidate of the Pakistan Tehreek-e-Insaf (PTI) from PP-224 (Lodhran-I) in the 2022 Punjab provincial by-election.

He ran for a seat in the Provincial Assembly from PP-224 Lodhran-I as a candidate of the PTI in the 2024 Punjab provincial election.
