= Gangal =

Gangal may refer to:

- Gangal (Attock)
- Gangal (Rawalpindi)
- Gangal (Jhelum)
