= Raja Sagheer Ahmed =

Pakistani politician

Member of the Provincial Assembly of the Punjab
- In office 22 July 2022 – 14 January 2023
- Constituency: PP-7 Rawalpindi-II
- In office 15 August 2018 – 21 May 2022
- Constituency: PP-7 Rawalpindi-II
- Incumbent
- Assumed office 23 February 2024

Personal details
- Party: PPP (2025-present)
- Other political affiliations: PMLN (2023-2025); IND (2018); PTI (2018-2022)
- Children: 4

Raja Sagheer Ahmed Janjua is a Pakistani politician who had been a member of the Provincial Assembly of the Punjab from February 2008 to March 2013, again till August 2018 till January 2023 and was re-elected to assembly for third tenure in General Elections 2024.

== Early life ==
He was born on 1 January 1956 in Matore, Tehsil Kahuta, District Rawalpindi, Pakistan.

== Political career ==
He was elected to the Provincial Assembly of the Punjab as an independent candidate from Constituency PP-7 (Rawalpindi-II) in the 2018 Pakistani general election. He received 44,363 votes and defeated Raja Muhammad Ali, a candidate of Pakistan Muslim League Nawaz (PML(N)). Following his successful election, he joined Pakistan Tehreek-e-Insaf (PTI).

On 21 May 2022, he was de-seated due to voting against the PTI's Chief Minister candidate.

He was narrowly re-elected to the Provincial Assembly in the subsequent by-election as a candidate of the PML(N). He received 68,906 votes and defeated Muhammad Shabbir Awan, a candidate of the PTI, who received 68,857 votes.
