= Samote Union Council =

Pakistani administrative area

Samote سموٹ
- Union Council
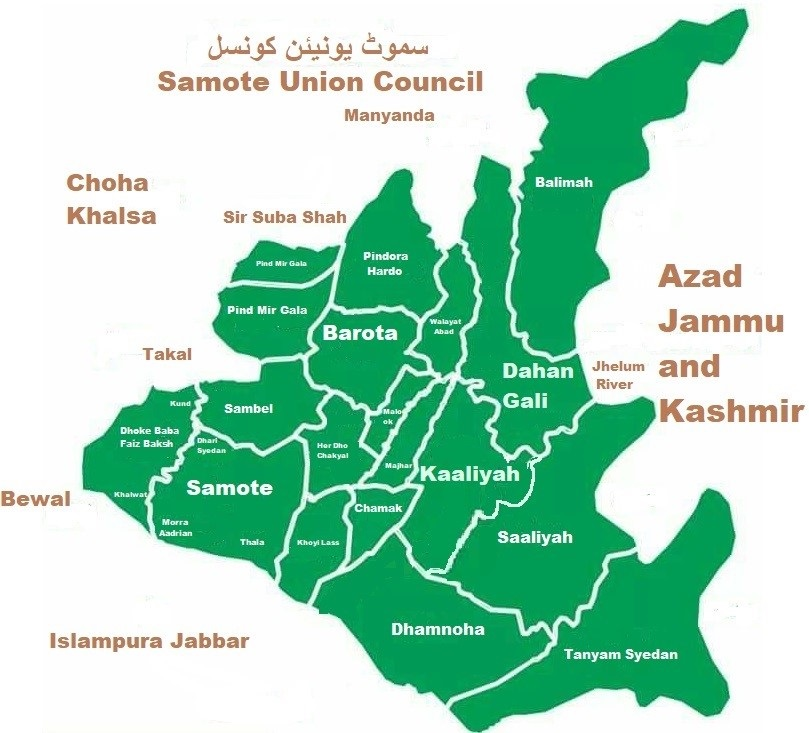

- Location within Punjab, Pakistan Location within Pakistan
- Coordinates: 33°20′7″N 73°29′45″E
- Country: Pakistan
- Region: Punjab
- District: Rawalpindi District
- Tehsil: Kallar Syedan
- Capital: Samote
- Villages: 21

Government
  - Chairman: Raja Ali Asghar
  - Vice Chairman: Raja Irfan ul Haq

Population
  - Total: 15,242 (2,023 Census)
- Time zone: UTC+5 (PST)
- Area code: 051

Samote Union Council (Urdu: سموٹ یونیئن کونسل) is located in Punjab, Pakistan. Previously part of Tehsil Kahuta, it was officially designated as a union council of Tehsil Kallar Syedan in Rawalpindi District on 1 July 2004.

== Delimitation 2018 ==
Samote comes under Choha Khalsa Circle Union Councils Samote was under NA-50, of National Assembly and PP-2, of Punjab Assembly. After (Delimitation 2018) Samote Union Council came under NA-58 [1], of National Assembly and PP-7 of Punjab Assembly [2] and it was again shifted to NA-51 for the 2024 general elections alongside its tehsil.

== Geography ==
Kallar Syedan, the capital city, is a main shopping centre for the people. The countryside surrounding the town is typical of Potohar Plateau landscape. It is surrounded by several smaller towns along with the main towns: Bewal, Choha Khalsa, Islampura Jabbar and Sir Suba Shah. The fertile land of the Union Council Samote region grows crops such as wheat, corn and peanuts.

== People ==
The principal clans of Samote are the Malik Awan, Qureshis,Gakhar (Kayani), Gujjars (chaudhri), Mughals, Sayyid, Rajputs (Jasyal Kanyals, Hashmis, Rajputs).

== Economy ==
Many residents own shops, while others are farmers. Many go abroad for a living, especially to the United Kingdom.

== Sports ==
Popular sports include kabaddi, volleyball, bull racing. Dog fighting is also popular.

== Villages ==
- Samote Mirzian
- Dhok Ghulam Mustafa Kiani
- Dhoke Baba Faiz Baksh
- Balimah
- Samote
- Barota
- Chamak
- Dahan Gali
- Dhamnoha
- Hayal Pindora
- Her Dho Chakyal
- Kaaliyah
- Khoyi Lass
- Malook
- Pind Mir Gala
- Majhar
- Morra Aadrian
- PindoraHardo
- Saaliyah
- Sambel
- Shah Khahi
- Tanyam Syedan
- Walayat Abad
- Dhoke Bhatiyan

== Education ==
The area has many schools, including:

- Government Boys Higher Secondary School Samote
- Government Girls Higher Secondary School Samote
- Government Boys High School Kaaliyah
- Government Girls High School Kaaliyah
- Haqani Public School & College Samote
- Government Girls Primary School Sambel
- Government Primary School for Girls Walayat Abad
- Jammia Mohi Ul Islam Saddiqia Lilbanat Pandora
- Government Girls Primary School Chamak
- Government Girls Primary School Malook
- Government Girls High School Dhoke Baba Faiz Buksh
- Government Elementary School Dhaan Gali
- Government Girls Primary School Dhamnoha
- Government Primary School Barota
- Globel School Pandora Hardo, UC Samote
- Govt Model Primary school Siahli Umer Khan
- The Rule school system Samote
- Misali Public School and College Samote

== Notable people ==
- Dada Amir Haider Khan - Communist leader of undivided India and later Pakistan
- Ch Muhammad Khalid (late) - Ex MPA PP-7 Punjab Assembly Pakistan Peoples Party (1988–1997)
- Lt. Col (R) Muhammad Shabbir Awan, ex MPA PP2 Punjab Assembly Col Shabbir Awan joined PTI on 19 December 2013

== Attractions ==
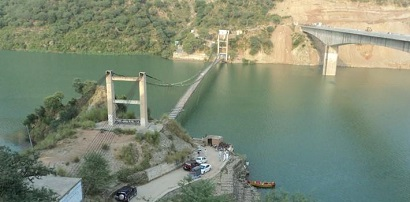
Dhan Gali Bridge

- Jhelum River 33°21′10″N 73°33′57″E
- Dhan Gali Bridge 33°21′37″N 73°34′03″E

== See also ==
- Awans of Pakistan
- Gangal Awan
