= Faisal Hayat Jabboana =

Faisal Hayat Sherani, The Pakistani Politician

Member of the Provincial Assembly of the Punjab
- In office 15 August 2018 – 21 May 2022
- Succeeded by: Mian Muhammad Azam Cheela
- Constituency: PP-125 (Jhang-II)

Personal details
- Party: IPP (2023-present)
- Other political affiliations: PMLN (2022-2023); PTI (2018-2022)

Faisal Hayat Jabboana is a Pakistani politician who was a member of the Provincial Assembly of the Punjab from August 2018 to May 2022.

== Political career ==
He was elected to the Provincial Assembly of the Punjab as an independent candidate from PP-125 Jhang-II in the 2018 Punjab provincial election. He received 51,050 votes and defeated Mian Muhammad Azam Cheela, a candidate of the Pakistan Tehreek-e-Insaf (PTI).

He joined the PTI following his election.

On 11 September 2018, he was inducted into the provincial Punjab cabinet of Chief Minister Usman Buzdar and was appointed advisor to the Chief Minister on Livestock and Dairy Development.

On 21 May 2022, he was de-seated due to his vote against party policy for Chief Minister of Punjab election on 16 April 2022.

He ran as a candidate of the Pakistan Muslim League (N) (PML(N)) in the subsequent by-election. He received 52,277 votes and was defeated by Mian Muhammad Azam Cheela, a candidate of the PTI.
