= Nazir Ahmad Chohan =

Pakistani politician

Former Member of the Provincial Assembly of the Punjab
- In office 15 August 2018 – 21 May 2022
- Constituency: PP-167 (Lahore-XXIV)

Personal details
- Born: Lahore, Punjab, Pakistan
- Party: IPP (2025-present)
- Other political affiliations: PMLN (2022-2024); PTI (2018-2022)

Nazir Ahmad Chohan is a Pakistani politician who was a member of the Provincial Assembly of the Punjab from August 2018 to May 2022.

== Political career ==
He was elected to the Provincial Assembly of the Punjab as a candidate of Pakistan Tehreek-e-Insaf from PP-167 Lahore-XXIV in the 2018 Pakistani general election. He received 40,680 votes and defeated Mian Muhammad Saleem, a candidate of the Pakistan Muslim League (N) (PML(N)).

On 21 May 2022, he was de-seated due to his vote against party policy for Chief Minister of Punjab election on 16 April 2022.

He ran as a candidate of the PML(N) in the subsequent by-election, but was unsuccessful. He received 26,417 votes and was defeated by Shabbir Gujjar, a candidate of the PTI.

On 3 August 2022, Chohan, his son and six others were taken into judicial remand by the Lahore Police.
