= Hasan Aslam Awan =

Pakistani politician

- حسن اسلم اعوان

Member of the Provincial Assembly of the Punjab
- In office 21 July 2022 – 14 January 2023
- Preceded by: Malik Ghulam Rasool Sangha
- Constituency: PP-83 Khushab-II

Personal details
- Born: 10 February 1978 (age 48) Khushab, Punjab, Pakistan
- Party: PTI (2022-present)
- Relations: Umer Aslam Awan (brother); Malik Naeem Khan Awan (uncle)

Hasan Aslam Khan Awan is a Pakistani politician who had been a member of the Provincial Assembly of the Punjab from July 2022 to August 2023. He is also the younger brother of Umer Aslam Awan, a former member of the National Assembly.

== Political career ==
He was elected to the Provincial Assembly of the Punjab in the July 2022 Punjab provincial by-election from PP-83 Khushab-II as a candidate of the Pakistan Tehreek-e-Insaf (PTI). He received 71,648 votes and defeated Muhammad Asif Malik, an independent candidate, who received 43,587 votes.

He was re-elected to the Provincial Assembly in the 2024 Punjab provincial election from PP-81 Khushab-I as an independent candidate supported by PTI. He received 46,991 votes and defeated Ameer Haider Sangha, a candidate of Istehkam-e-Pakistan Party (IPP).
