= Shabbir Gujjar =

Pakistani Punjabi Gujjar politician

Member of the Provincial Assembly of the Punjab
- In office 21 July 2022 – 14 January 2023
- Constituency: PP-167 Lahore-XXIV

Personal details
- Born: Lahore, Punjab, Pakistan
- Party: PTI (2022-present)
- Education: Government College University, Lahore

Chaudary Shabbir Ahmad Gujjar (Urdu: چوہدری شبیر گجر) is a Pakistani politician and Businessman from Lahore, Punjab who had been a member of the Provincial Assembly of the Punjab from July 2022 until the dissolvement of the Provincial Assembly of the Punjab in January 2023.

== Political career ==
He was elected to the Provincial Assembly of the Punjab from PP-167 Lahore-XXIV as a candidate of the Pakistan Tehreek-e-Insaf (PTI) in the July 2022 Punjab provincial by-election. He received 40,511 votes and defeated Nazir Ahmad Chohan, a candidate of the Pakistan Muslim League (N) (PML(N)).
