= Mian Muhammad Azam Cheela =

Pakistani politician

Member of the Provincial Assembly of the Punjab
- In office 18 July 2022 – 14 January 2023
- Constituency: PP-125 Jhang-II
- In office 1 June 2013 – 31 May 2018

Personal details
- Born: Jhang, Punjab, Pakistan
- Party: PTI (2018-present)

Mian Muhammad Azam Cheela is a Pakistani politician who had been a member of the Provincial Assembly of the Punjab from July 2022 till January 2023.

== Political career ==
He ran for the Provincial Assembly of the Punjab from PP-125 Jhang-II as a candidate of the Pakistan Tehreek-e-Insaf (PTI) in the 2018 Punjab provincial election, but was unsuccessful. He received 38,699 votes and was defeated by Faisal Hayat Jabboana, an independent candidate.

He was elected to the Provincial Assembly from PP-125 (Jhang-II) as a candidate of the Pakistan Tehreek-e-Insaf (PTI) in the 2022 Punjab provincial by-election. He received 82,297 votes and defeated Faisal Hayat Jabboana, a candidate of the Pakistan Muslim League (N) (PML(N)).

He ran for a seat in the Provincial Assembly from PP-130 Jhang-VII as a candidate of the PTI in the 2024 Punjab provincial election.
