= PP-132 Nankana Sahib-I =

Constituency of the Provincial Assembly of Punjab, Pakistan

- Constituency for the Provincial Assembly of Punjab
- Region: Sangla Hill Tehsil and Shah Kot Tehsil (partly) of Nankana Sahib District

Current constituency
- Created from: PP-170 Nankana Sahib-I and PP-171 Nankana Sahib-II (2002-2018); PP-131 Nankana Sahib-I (2018-2023)

PP-132 Nankana Sahib-I (پی پی-132، ننكانہ صاحِب-1) is a Constituency of Provincial Assembly of Punjab.

== General elections 2024 ==
Provincial election 2024: PP-132 Nankana Sahib-I
Party	Candidate	Votes	%	±%
Independent	Sultan Bajwa	47,771	37.11	
PML(N)	Mian Ijaz Hussain Bhatti	38,248	29.71	
Independent	Muhammad Ahsan Raza Wagha	14,758	11.46	
TLP	Amanat Ali	12,540	9.74	
Independent	Muhammad Azam	5,427	4.22	
Independent	Muhammad Adnan Ashraf (Note: Filed nomination papers as PTI candidate but ECP allowed him to run as an Independent)	3,971	3.09	
Others	Others (twenty three candidates)	6,017	4.67	
Turnout		134,023	53.54	
Total valid votes		128,732	96.05	
Rejected ballots		5,291	3.95	
Majority		9,523	7.40	
Registered electors		250,311		
hold				

== General elections 2018 ==
Provincial election 2018: PP-131 Nankana Sahib-I
Party	Candidate	Votes	%	±%
PML(N)	Mian Ijaz Hussain Bhatti	37,118	30.57	
Independent	Shazia Cheema	35,886	29.56	
PTI	Tariq Saeed Ghuman	31,787	26.18	
TLP	Rana Jammat Ali Masoomi	14,220	11.71	
Others	Others (nine candidates)	2,395	1.98	
Turnout		124,124	59.65	
Total valid votes		121,406	97.81	
Rejected ballots		2,718	2.19	
Majority		1,232	1.01	
Registered electors		208,085		

== General elections 2013 ==
Provincial election 2013: PP-170 Nankana Sahib-I
Party	Candidate	Votes	%	±%
Independent	Tariq Mehmood Bajwa	36,444	41.26	
Independent	Mian Ijaz Hussain Bahtti	14,725	16.67	
Independent	Tariq Saeed	14,271	16.16	
PPP	Mushtaq Hussain	7,624	8.63	
PTI	Ahmad Sajjad Haidar	5,359	6.07	
Independent	Irfan ul Hasan Bhati	4,599	5.21	
Independent	Imtiaz Ahmad Kahloon	3,077	3.48	
Others	Others (twenty five candidates)	2,236	2.53	
Turnout		91,714	58.20	
Total valid votes		88,335	96.32	
Rejected ballots		3,379	3.68	
Majority		21,719	24.59	
Registered electors		157,578		

== General elections 2008 ==
Tariq Mehood Bajwa from PMLN was elected as MPA.

== See also ==
- PP-131 Jhang-VII
- PP-133 Nankana Sahib-II
