= Abdul Ghaffar Wattoo =

Pakistani politician

- عبد الغفار وٹو

Member of the National Assembly of Pakistan
- Incumbent
- Assumed office 29 February 2024
- Constituency: NA-160 Bahawalnagar-I
- In office 13 August 2018 – 10 August 2023
- Constituency: NA-166 (Bahawalnagar-I)

Personal details
- Born: 18 March 1974 (age 52)
- Party: PMLN (2023-present)
- Other political affiliations: PTI (2018-2022)
- Relations: Mian Fida Hussain Wattoo (uncle)
- Parent: Khadim Hussain Wattoo (father)

Abdul Ghaffar Wattoo (Urdu: عبد الغفار وٹو) is a Pakistani politician who has been a member of the National Assembly of Pakistan since February 2024 and previously served in this position from August 2018 till August 2023.

== Political career ==
He was elected to the National Assembly of Pakistan from NA-166 (Bahawalnagar-I) as an independent candidate in the 2018 Pakistani general election. He received 102,385 votes and defeated Syed Muhammad Asghar Shah, a candidate of Pakistan Tehreek-e-Insaf (PTI). Following his successful election, he joined PTI in August 2018.

He was re-elected to the National Assembly from NA-160 Bahawalnagar-I as a candidate of Pakistan Muslim League (N) (PML(N)) in the 2024 Pakistani general election. He received 118,557 votes and defeated Syed Muhammad Asghar Shah, an independent candidate.

== More Reading ==
- List of members of the 15th National Assembly of Pakistan
