= Khadim Hussain Wattoo =

Pakistani politician (born 1950)

Member of the National Assembly of Pakistan
- In office 2008–2013
- Constituency: NA-188 (Bahawalnagar-I)

Member of the Provincial Assembly of the Punjab
- In office 2002–2007
- Constituency: PP-277 (Bahawalnagar-I)
- In office 1985–1993
- Constituency: PP-225 (Bahawalnagar)

Personal details
- Born: 25 March 1950 Bahawalnagar, Punjab, Pakistan
- Died: 5 October 2016 (aged 66) Lahore, Punjab, Pakistan
- Party: Pakistan Muslim League (N) (2013-2016)
- Other political affiliations: Pakistan Muslim League (Q) (2002–2013); Pakistan Muslim League (N) (1997-2002); Pakistan Muslim League (J) (1993–1997); Pakistan Muslim League (1985–1993)
- Relations: Mian Fida Hussain Wattoo (brother)
- Children: Abdul Ghaffar Wattoo (son)

Mian Khadim Hussain Wattoo (Urdu: میاں خادم حسین وٹو) also known as Akhter Khadam (25 March 1950 - 5 October 2016) was a Pakistani politician who had been a member of the National Assembly of Pakistan from 2008 to 2013. Previously, he had been a provincial minister of Zakat and Ushr from 2002 to 2007. He had also been a member of the Provincial Assembly of the Punjab from 1985 to 1993 and again from 2002 to 2007.

== Early life and education ==
He was born in 1950 in Minchinabad.

He graduated in 1972 from University of the Punjab from where he received a degree of Bachelor of Arts.

== Political career ==
He was elected to the Provincial Assembly of the Punjab from Constituency PP-225 (Bahawalnagar) in the 1985 Pakistani general election and served as Parliamentary Secretary for Local Government and Rural Development.

He was re-elected to the Provincial Assembly of the Punjab from Constituency PP-225 (Bahawalnagar-I) as a candidate of Islami Jamhoori Ittehad (IJI) in the 1988 Pakistani general election. He received 26,212 votes and defeated Muhammad Akram, a candidate of Pakistan Peoples Party (PPP). During his tenure as Member of the Punjab Assembly, he served as Parliamentary Secretary for Planning and Development.

He was re-elected to the Provincial Assembly of the Punjab as a candidate of IJI from Constituency PP-225 (Bahawalnagar-I) in the 1990 Pakistani general election. He received 32,669 votes and defeated Muhammad Sardar Khan, a candidate of Pakistan Democratic Alliance (PDA). During his tenure as Member of the Punjab Assembly, he served as Parliamentary Secretary for Agriculture.

He ran for the seat of the Provincial Assembly of the Punjab as a candidate of Pakistan Muslim League (J) from Constituency PP-225 (Bahawalnagar-I) in the 1993 Pakistani general election but was unsuccessful. He received 20,146 votes and lost the seat to Muhammad Sardar Khan Gadhoka, candidate of Pakistan Muslim League (N) (PML-N).

He ran for the seat of the Provincial Assembly of the Punjab as an independent candidate from Constituency PP-225 (Bahawalnagar-I) in the 1997 Pakistani general election but was unsuccessful. He received 21,984 votes and lost the seat to Muhammad Sardar Khan Wattoo.

He was re-elected to the Provincial Assembly of the Punjab as a candidate of Pakistan Muslim League (Q) (PML-Q) from Constituency PP-277 (Bahawalnagar-I) in the 2002 Pakistani general election. He received 45,495 votes and defeated Hamid Hassan Wattoo, a candidate of PML-N.

He was elected to the National Assembly of Pakistan from Constituency NA-188 (Bahawalnagar-I) as a candidate of PML-Q in the 2008 Pakistani general election. He received 52,981 votes and defeated Shoukat Ali Joya Laleka, a candidate of PPP. In the same election, he was re-elected to the Provincial Assembly of the Punjab as a candidate of PML-Q from Constituency PP-277 (Bahawalnagar-I). He received 38,532 votes and defeated Syed Muhammad Asghar Shah. He vacated the Punjab Assembly seat.

He ran for the seat of the National Assembly from Constituency NA-188 (Bahawalnagar-I) as a candidate of PML-N in the 2013 Pakistani general election but was unsuccessful. He received 89,262 votes and lost the seat to Syed Muhammad Asghar Shah.
