= Muhammad Amin Zulqernain =

Pakistani politician

Chaudhary Muhammad Amin Zulqarnain

Member of the Provincial Assembly of the Punjab
- In office 15 August 2018 – 21 May 2022
- Constituency: PP-170 (Lahore-XXVII)

Personal details
- Relations: Aun Chaudhry (brother)

Chaudhary Muhammad Amin Zulqernain (born 21 August 1977) is a Pakistani politician who had been a member of the Provincial Assembly of the Punjab from August 2018 till May 2022. He became Parliamentary Secretary Punjab for the Cooperatives Department in April 2019.

== Political career ==
He joined the Pakistan Tehreek-e-Insaf (PTI) in 2011.

He was elected to the Provincial Assembly of the Punjab as a candidate of PTI from PP-170 Lahore-XXVII in the 2018 Punjab provincial election. He received 25,215 votes and defeated Imran Javed, a candidate of the Pakistan Muslim League (N) (PML(N)).

He was appointed parliamentary Secretary Punjab for Cooperatives Department on 15 April 2019.

On 21 May 2022, he was de-seated for voting against the party candidate for the Chief Minister election on 16 April 2022.

He ran as a candidate of the PML(N) in the subsequent by-election. He received 17,519 votes and lost to Malik Zaheer Abbas of the PTI.
