= Malik Zaheer Abbas =

Pakistani politician

Member of the National Assembly of Pakistan
- In office 2002–2007

Member of the Provincial Assembly of the Punjab
- In office 17 July 2022 – 14 January 2023

Personal details
- Born: September 24, 1975 (age 51) Lahore, Punjab, Pakistan
- Party: PTI (2018-present)
- Other political affiliations: PPP (2002-2007); IND (2008)

Malik Zaheer Abbas is a Pakistani politician who served as a Member of the National Assembly of Pakistan from 2002 to 2007 and as a Member of the Provincial Assembly of Punjab from July 2022 to January 2023. He is a member of PTI.

He was born in Lahore on 24 September 1975 to Khursheed Ahmad Malik. In 1999, he received his LL.B. degree from the University of Punjab in Lahore. He also held the position of managing director of Pakistan Bait-ul-Mal from 2021 to 2022.

== Political career ==
He was elected to the National Assembly of Pakistan in the 2002 Pakistani general election from NA-128 Lahore-XI as a candidate of the Pakistan People's Party (PPP). He received 31,175 votes and defeated Sardar Kamil Umar, a candidate of the Pakistan Muslim League (N) (PML(N)).

He ran for a seat in the National Assembly in the 2008 Pakistani general election from NA-124 Lahore-XI as an independent candidate, but was unsuccessful. He received 257 votes and was defeated by Afzal Khokhar, a candidate of the PML(N).

He was elected to the Provincial Assembly of the Punjab in the July 2022 Punjab provincial by-election from PP-170 Lahore-XXVII as a candidate of the Pakistan Tehreek-e-Insaf (PTI). He received 24,688 votes and defeated Muhammad Amin Zulqernain, a candidate of the PML(N).
