= Muhammad Shabbir =

Muhammad Shabbir may refer to:

- Shabbir Muhammad, Pakistani field hockey player
- Muhammad Shabbir Awan, Pakistani politician
- Muhammad Shabbir Qureshi, Pakistani politician
