= Mehar Muhammad Nawaz =

Pakistani politician

Member of the Provincial Assembly of Punjab
- In office 21 July 2022 – 14 January 2023
- Preceded by: Mehar Muhammad Aslam Bharwana
- Constituency: PP-127 Jhang-IV

Personal details
- Born: Satiana, Punjab, Pakistan
- Party: PTI (2022-present)

Mehar Muhammad Nawaz is a Pakistani politician who had been a member of the Provincial Assembly of the Punjab from July 2022 to January 2023.

Mehar Muhammad Nawaz was born on 11 October 1963, in Mauza Satiana, Jhang. His father is Mehr Muhammad Fuzail.

== Political career ==
He ran for a seat in the Provincial Assembly of the Punjab in the 2018 Punjab provincial election from PP-127 Jhang-IV as a candidate of the Pakistan Tehreek-e-Insaf (PTI), but was unsuccessful. He received 26,765 votes and was defeated by Mehar Muhammad Aslam Bharwana, an independent candidate, who received 27,353 votes.

He was elected to the Provincial Assembly in the July 2022 Punjab provincial by-election from PP-127 Jhang-IV as a candidate of the PTI. He received 71,648 votes and defeated Mehar Muhammad Aslam Bharwana, a candidate of the Pakistan Muslim League (N) (PML(N)), who received 47,413 votes.
