= Khurram Shahzad Virk =

Pakistani politician

Member of the National Assembly of Pakistan
- Incumbent
- Assumed office 29 February 2024
- Constituency: NA-115 Sheikhupura-III

Member of the Provincial Assembly of the Punjab
- In office 18 July 2022 – 14 January 2023
- Preceded by: Mian Khalid Mehmood
- Constituency: PP-140 Sheikhupura-VI

Minister of Law Punjab
- In office 7 August 2022 – 14 January 2023
- Preceded by: Malik Ahmad Khan

Minister of Parliamentary Affairs Punjab
- In office 7 August 2022 – 15 August 2022
- Succeeded by: Muhammad Basharat Raja

Personal details
- Born: 1 April 1983 (age 43) Sheikhupura, Punjab, Pakistan
- Party: PTI (2022-present)

Khurram Shahzad Virk is a Pakistani politician who is a member of National Assembly of Pakistan since February 2024. He had been a member of the Provincial Assembly of the Punjab from July 2022 till January 2023. He also served as Minister of law before assembly dissolved.

== Early life and education ==
Born on 1 April 1983 in Sheikhupura, Punjab, he obtained his LLB in 2005 from the Punjab University, Lahore and Master's in Philosophy in 2007 from the G. C. University, Lahore.

== Political career ==
He was elected to the Provincial Assembly of the Punjab from Constituency PP-140 Sheikhupura-VI as a candidate of Pakistan Tehreek-e-Insaf (PTI) in the July 2022 Punjab provincial by-election. He received 50,166 votes and defeated Mian Khalid Mehmood, a candidate of the Pakistan Muslim League (N) (PML(N)).

He was elected to the National Assembly of Pakistan from NA-115 Sheikhupura-III as a PTI-backed independent candidate in the 2024 Pakistani general election. He received 130,416 votes and defeated Mian Javed Latif, a candidate of PML(N).
