= Mian Khalid Mehmood =

Pakistani politician

Provincial Minister of Punjab for Disaster Management
- In office 13 September 2018 – 30 April 2022

Member of the Provincial Assembly of the Punjab
- In office 15 August 2018 – 21 May 2022
- Succeeded by: Khurram Shahzad Virk
- Constituency: PP-140 (Sheikhupura-VI)

Personal details
- Born: Sheikhupura, Punjab, Pakistan
- Party: AP (2025-present)
- Other political affiliations: IPP (2023-2025); PMLN (2022-2023); PTI (2018-2022)

Mian Khalid Mehmood is a Pakistani politician who served as the provincial minister of Punjab for disaster management from 2018 to 2022. He was a member of the Punjab assembly from 2018 to 2022.

== Early life and education ==
He was born on 1 October 1960 in Sheikhupura, Pakistan.

He graduated from the University of the Punjab in 2002 and received a degree of Bachelor of Arts.

== Political career ==
He was elected to the Provincial Assembly of the Punjab as a candidate of Pakistan Muslim League (Q) (PML-Q) from Constituency PP-167 (Sheikhupura-VI) in the 2002 Pakistani general election. He received 16,987 votes and defeated Chaudhry Ghulam Nabi, a candidate of Pakistan Muslim League (N) (PML-N).

He ran for the seat of the Provincial Assembly of the Punjab as a candidate of PML-Q from Constituency PP-167 (Sheikhupura-VI) in the 2008 Pakistani general election but was unsuccessful. He received 11,554 votes and lost the seat to Chaudhry Ghulam Nabi, a candidate of PML-N.

He ran for the seat of the Provincial Assembly of the Punjab as an independent candidate from Constituency PP-167 (Sheikhupura-VI) in the 2013 Pakistani general election but was unsuccessful. He received 11,963 votes and lost the seat to Muhammad Arif Khan Sindhila.

He was re-elected to the Provincial Assembly of the Punjab as a candidate of Pakistan Tehreek-e-Insaf (PTI) from PP-140 Sheikhupura-VI in the 2018 Punjab provincial election. He received 32,965 votes and defeated Yasir Iqbal, a candidate of the PML(N).

On 12 September 2018, he was inducted into the provincial Punjab cabinet of Chief Minister Sardar Usman Buzdar. On 13 September 2018, he was appointed as Provincial Minister of Punjab for Disaster Management.

On 21 May 2022, was de-seated due to his vote against party policy for Chief Minister of Punjab election on 16 April 2022.

He ran in the subsequent by-election as a candidate of the PML(N) but was unsuccessful. He received 32,106 votes and lost to Khurram Shahzad Virk, a candidate of the PTI. He is serving as the Chief head of IPP in Lahore and Sheikhupura region. Currently, he is serving as secretary to Abdul Aleem Khan.
