= Syed Rafi Uddin =

Pakistani politician

Syed Muhammad Rafi Uddin is an Independent Pakistani politician who has represented the PP-228 Lodhran in the Provincial Assembly of the Punjab since the 2022 by-election.
