= PP-227 Lodhran-III =

Constituency of the Punjabi Provincial Legislature, Pakistan

- Constituency for the Provincial Assembly of Punjab
- Region: Lodhran Tehsil (partly) including Lodhran city of Lodhran District

Current constituency
- Created from: PP-210 Lodhran-IV (2002-2018); PP-227 Lodhran-IV (2018-2023)

PP-227 Lodhran-III (پی پی-227، لودهراں-3) is a Constituency of Provincial Assembly of Punjab.

== General elections 2024 ==
Provincial election 2024: PP-227 Lodhran-III
Party	Candidate	Votes	%	±%
PML(N)	Muhammad Zubair Khan	55,324	42.71	
Independent	Nawab Aman Ullah Khan (Note: Filed nomination papers as PTI candidate but ECP allowed him to run as an Independent)	36,736	28.36	
IPP	Muhammad Ashraf	18,996	14.67	
TLP	Muhammad Faisal	6,640	5.13	
PPP	Sajjad Hussain	5,556	4.29	
Independent	Malik Fiaz Ahmad	2,404	1.86	
Others	Others (eleven candidates)	3,881	2.98	
Turnout		132,816	50.39	
Total valid votes		129,537	97.53	
Rejected ballots		3,279	2.47	
Majority		18,588	14.35	
Registered electors		263,552		
hold				

== General elections 2018 ==
Provincial election 2018: PP-227 Lodhran-IV
Party	Candidate	Votes	%	±%
PML(N)	Muhammad Siddique Khan	46,086	49.86	
PTI	Nawab Aman Ullah Khan	39,068	42.27	
Independent	Mian Sajid	2,431	2.63	
TLP	Muhammad Hamid	2,084	2.26	
Others	Others (seven candidates)	2,794	2.98	
Turnout		93,959	55.42	
Total valid votes		92,427	98.37	
Rejected ballots		1,532	1.63	
Majority		7,018	7.59	
Registered electors		169,529		

== General elections 2013 ==
Provincial election 2013: PP-210 Lodhran-IV
Party	Candidate	Votes	%	±%
Independent	Mohammad Siddique Khan Baloch	32,712	37.10	
PML(N)	Rana Mohamamd Aslam Khan	19,305	21.89	
PTI	Muhammad Irshad Abbas Ghullu	16,524	18.74	
Independent	Muhammad Ameer Jhandir	9,066	10.28	
PPP	Abdul Majeed Arain	6,527	7.40	
Others	Others (twenty one candidates)	4,037	4.58	
Turnout		91,567	62.51	
Total valid votes		88,171	96.29	
Rejected ballots		3,396	3.71	
Majority		13,407	15.21	
Registered electors		146,490		

== General elections 2008 ==
Contesting candidates	Party affiliation	Votes polled

== See also ==
- PP-226 Lodhran-II
- PP-228 Lodhran-IV
