= Dada Amir Haider Khan =

Indian activist

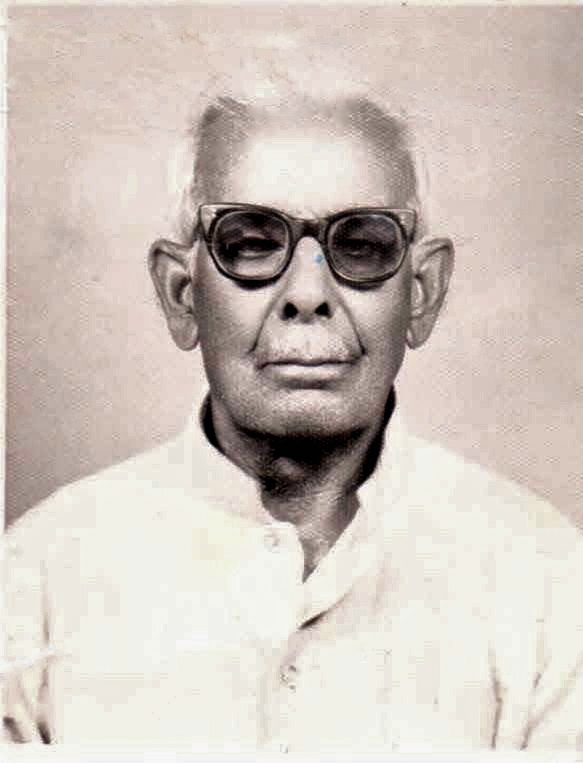
Dada Amir Haidar-c1965

Dada Amir Haider Khan (2 March 1900 – 27 December 1989) was a communist activist of Pakistan, and revolutionary during the Indian independence movement.

== Biography ==
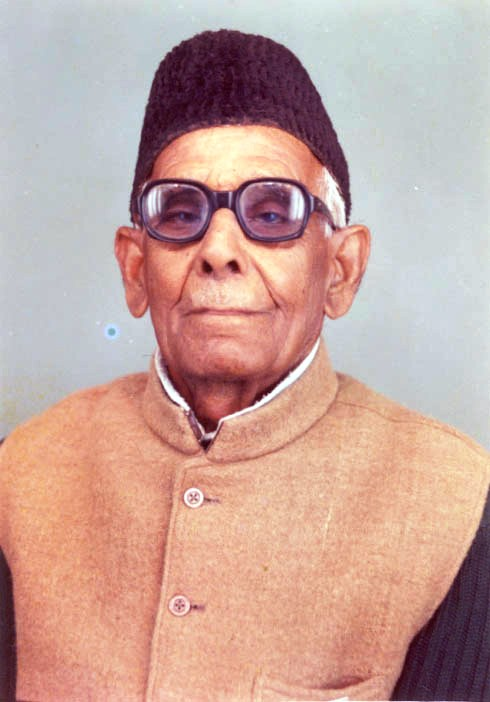
Dada Amir Haidar around 1980

Dada Amir Haider Khan was born in 1900 in a remote village called Saaliyah Umar Khan Union Council Samote, Tehsil Kallar Syedan in Rawalpindi district. He was orphaned at an early age – losing both parents, then put in a madrassah. He ended up running away from his village at the age of 14. In 1914, he joined British merchant navy and left the shores of Bombay as a coal-boy on a ship. He later transferred to the United States Merchant Marine in 1918. It became apparent later that he joined both institutions to be able to travel all over the world so he could do some practical learning and gain some first-hand experiences of the world on his own and judge the real-world circumstances for himself. Consequently, he worked at dockyards and storehouses and became very street-smart.

At this time, he met Joseph Mulkane, an Irish nationalist who introduced him to anti-British political ideas.

During his stay in USA, he was subjected to racist harassment and segregation attitudes when attempting to learn how to fly a plane in Southern Illinois, according to his memoirs.

In 1920, he met Indian nationalists and Ghadar Party members in New York City. He started distributing ‘Ghadar ki Goonj’ to Indians in sea ports around the world.

He was dismissed from the ship after the great post-war strike of World War I and worked and traveled inside the United States. He then became a political activist, worked with Anti-Imperialist League and the Workers Party (United States), which sent him to the Soviet Union to study at the University of the Toilers of the East. In 1928, he completed the University course in Moscow and arrived in Bombay in 1928. He established contact with S.V. Ghate, S.A. Dange, P.C. Joshi, B. T. Ranadive, Benjamin Francis Bradley and some other senior communists in Bombay. He also started to organise the workers of the textile industry in Bombay.

In March 1929, he escaped arrest in the Meerut Conspiracy Case and made his way to Moscow to inform the Communist International (Comintern) on the situation in India and seek their assistance.

Dada attended the International Trade Union (Profintern) Congress as member of the presidium and also attended the 16th Congress of the CPSU in 1930. After his return to Bombay, he was sent to Madras to avoid arrest as still he was wanted in the Meerut Conspiracy Case. He carried on the political work all over South India under the pseudonym of Shankar. He also set up the Young Workers League.

In 1932, he was arrested by the British for bringing out a pamphlet praising the Bhagat Singh Trio and sent to Muzzafargarh jail, then transferred to Ambala jail. He had been labeled as the most dangerous individual by the British authorities. When he was released in 1938, he started open public political activity in Bombay. The left wing of Congress elected him to the Indian National Congress (INC)'s Bombay Provincial Committee. He also attended the INC Annual General meeting in Ramgarh, Bihar.

He was re-arrested in 1939 as Second World War broke out. Later interned in Nashik jail where Dada wrote the first part of his memoirs. In 1942, he was the last of the Communists to be released after People’s War thesis. He worked for the Trade Union in Mumbai. He also attended the Natrakona (Mymansingh) All India Kisan Sabha in 1944.

Dada arrived in Rawalpindi on the eve of the independence of Pakistan to look after local party work in 1945. He organized a network all over Pakistan to hide, when wanted by the Government of Pakistan. Lahore was the nucleus of his activities. In Lahore, he used to take refuge in the house of a Sufi saint named Hussain Baksh Malang. He also safely repatriated Hindu families during the independence riots in 1947.

In 1949, Dada was arrested from the Party office in Rawalpindi under the Communal Act and released after 15 months. He got re-arrested after a few months from Rawalpindi Kutchery (Rawalpindi court) for organizing the defense of Hassan Nasir and Ali Imam. When the Pakistani government launched operation as a result of the Rawalpindi Conspiracy Case, Dada was moved to Lahore Fort and imprisoned with Faiz Ahmad Faiz, Fazal Din Qurban, Dada Feroz-ud-Din Mansoor, Syed Kaswar Gardezi, Haider Bux Jatoi, Sobo Gayan Chandani, Chaudhry Muhammad Afzal, Zaheer Kashmiri, Hameed Akhtar etc. He was released after campaign in Pakistan Times and Daily Imroze, but restricted to his village. He was shifted to Rawalpindi, when suspected influencing the military soldiers from his area.

In 1958, when General Ayub Khan imposed martial law in Pakistan, Dada was arrested and interned in Rawalpindi jail with Afzal Bangash, Kaka Sanober and other comrades.

Dada spent his twilight years in the 1970s and 1980s in Rawalpindi, but whenever he found the time, he used to visit Lahore to meet his intimate friend Hussain Baksh Malang. He donated his own land, and with his own labour, built a boys' high school in his village, then built a girls school together with a science laboratory. These schools were later approved by the government and placed under government control.

== Death and legacy ==
Dada Amir Haider Khan died on 27 December 1989 in Rawalpindi, Pakistan.

There is hardly any book available that describes and records for the future generations the experiences of an Indian and events of his time (early 20th century) from a progressive viewpoint. Dada discusses Bombay, Basra, Colombia, Rangoon, Port Said, Gibraltar, London, New York, Panama, Vladivostok, Shanghai, Manila, Madras, Cape Town, Buenos Aires, Baltimore, Naples, Trinidad, Port of Spain, Yokohama and Moscow of his youthful days in a candid manner in his memoirs.

A seminar was held in Karachi, in December 2008, to eulogise the role of this revolutionary. The seminar highlighted how Dada Amir Haider Khan played a role in spreading communist revolution across the world even though he and other communists like him have been banned from the history books of Pakistan. This seminar was organised by the University of Karachi's 'Pakistan Studies Centre'.

== Bibliography ==
- Chains to Lose: Life and Struggles of a Revolutionary : Memoirs of Dada Amir Haider Khan, Hassan Gardezi, Patriot Publishers, 1989. ISBN 81-7050-097-4.
- Chains to Lose: Dada Amir Haider. Edited by Hasan.N.Gardezi. Pakistan Study Centre, Karachi University, 2007. (Two Volumes).
- Bengali Harlem and the lost histories of South Asian America, Vivek Bald, Harvard University Press, 2013.
