= Muhammad Tahir Randhawa =

Pakistani politician

Member of the Provincial Assembly of the Punjab
- In office 15 August 2018 – 21 May 2022
- President: Arif Alvi
- Prime Minister: Imran Khan
- Chief Minister: Usman Buzdar; Hamza Shahbaz
- Constituency: PP-282 Layyah-III

Parliamentary Secretary for Agriculture Punjab, Pakistan
- In office 15 August 2018 – 21 May 2022

Personal details
- Born: Chowk Azam, Layyah, Pakistan
- Party: IPP (2025-present)
- Other political affiliations: PMLN (2022-2024); PTI (2018-2022)
- Children: 3
- Known for: Randhawa clan

Muhammad Tahir Randhawa is a Pakistani politician who had been a member of the Provincial Assembly of the Punjab from August 2018 to May 2022.

== Political career ==
He was elected to the Provincial Assembly of the Punjab as an independent candidate from PP-282 Layyah-III in the 2018 Pakistani general election.

He joined Pakistan Tehreek-e-Insaf (PTI) following his election. Mr Randhawa joined Imran Khan led Pakistan Tehreek-e-Insaf following a meeting with Jahangir Khan Tareen. In April 2021, Randhawa attended a meeting with Tareen following new sugar scandal cases against the later in Pakistan. Tareen discussed his concerns with him along with many other PTI MNAs and MPA's.

He was de-seated due to his vote against party policy for the Chief Minister of Punjab election on 16 April 2022. He ran in the resulting by-election for PP-282 Layyah-III as a candidate of the Pakistan Muslim League (N) (PML(N)), but was unsuccessful. He received 38,758 votes and was defeated by Qaisar Abbas Khan Magsi, a candidate of the PTI.
