= PP-228 Lodhran-IV =

Constituency of the Provincial Assembly of Punjab, Pakistan

- Constituency for the Provincial Assembly of Punjab
- Region: Lodhran Tehsil (partly) and Dunyapur Tehsil (partly) of Lodhran District

Current constituency
- Created from: PP-211 Lodhran-V (2002 to 2018); PP-224 Lodhran-I and PP-228 Lodhran-V (2018 to 2023)

PP-228 Lodhran-IV (پی پی-228، لودهراں-4) is a constituency of the Provincial Assembly of Punjab, located in Lodhran District, Punjab. It covers parts of Lodhran Tehsil and Dunyapur Tehsil. The constituency was established in its current form following the 2023 delimitation and succeeds earlier constituencies designated as PP-211 Lodhran-V (2002 to 2018) and PP-228 Lodhran-V (2018 to 2023).

== Members of Parliament ==
Election	Member	Party
2013	Ahmed Khan (alias Ahmad Bukhsh)	Independent
2018	Nazir Ahmad Khan	PTI
2024	Izzat Javaid Khan	Independent (PTI-affiliated) (Note: Filed nomination papers as a PTI candidate but was required by the Election Commission of Pakistan to contest as an independent candidate.)

== 2024 general election ==
Provincial elections were held on 17 February 2024.

Provincial election 2024: PP-228 Lodhran-IV
Party	Candidate	Votes	%	±%
Independent	Izzat Javaid Khan	62,431	39.49	
PML(N)	Syed Muhammad Rafi Udin Bukhari	43,439	27.48	
IPP	Nazir Ahmad Khan	28,601	18.09	
TLP	Muhammad Bilal	5,884	3.72	
Independent	Muhammad Saleem	4,525	2.86	
PPP	Syed Arshad Ali Shah	3,928	2.49	
Independent	Sami Ud Din Sheroz	3,587	2.27	
Independent	Ghulam Mustafa	3,085	1.95	
Others	Others (eight candidates)	2,620	1.29	
Turnout		162,096	55.32	
Total valid votes		158,100	97.53	
Rejected ballots		3,996	2.47	
Majority		18,992	12.01	
Registered electors		293,005		

== 2018 general election ==
Provincial elections were held on 25 July 2018. The constituency contested in 2018 was designated PP-228 Lodhran-V under the then-current delimitation.

Provincial election 2018: PP-228 Lodhran-V
Party	Candidate	Votes	%	±%
PTI	Nazir Ahmad Khan	43,256	41.78	
PML(N)	Syed Muhammad Rafi Ud Din	39,869	38.51	
Independent	Hassan Mehmood	15,942	15.40	
PPP	Shah Nawaz	3,017	2.91	
Others	Others (four candidates)	1,455	1.41	
Turnout		106,074	57.34	
Total valid votes		103,539	97.61	
Rejected ballots		2,535	2.39	
Majority		3,387	3.27	
Registered electors		184,993		

== 2013 general election ==
Provincial elections were held on 11 May 2013. The constituency contested in 2013 was designated PP-211 Lodhran-V under the then-current delimitation.

Provincial election 2013: PP-211 Lodhran-V
Party	Candidate	Votes	%	±%
Independent	Ahmed Khan (alias Ahmad Bukhsh)	32,717	36.94	
PTI	Izzat Javaid Khan	23,426	26.45	
PML(N)	Hassan Mehmood	22,236	25.10	
PPP	Syed Walayat Hussain Shah	6,001	6.78	
JUI (F)	Malik Ejaz Ahmad	2,526	2.85	
Others	Others (eleven candidates)	1,669	1.88	
Turnout		92,456	63.32	
Total valid votes		88,575	95.80	
Rejected ballots		3,881	4.20	
Majority		9,291	10.49	
Registered electors		146,020		

== 2008 general election ==
Provincial elections were held on 18 February 2008. No candidate or result data for this constituency is currently available in this article.

== See also ==
- PP-227 Lodhran-III
- PP-229 Vehari-I
