= Dhoke Baba Faiz Baksh =

Village in Rawalpindi, Punjab, Pakistan

Dhok Baba Faiz Bukhsh is a village situated in the Samote Union Council, Kallar Syedan Tehsil of district Rawalpindi, Punjab, Pakistan. Post Code 47490. There is the shrine of Baba Faiz Bakhsh in the village.

Coord|33°21′22″N 73°28′34″E
