= Kaaliyah =

- Village
- Location within Pakistan
- Coordinates: 33°20′55″N 73°32′36″E
- Country: Pakistan
- UC: Samote
- Tehsil: Kallar Syedan
- District: Rawalpindi

Kaaliyah is a village in Samote Union Council of Kallar Syedan Tehsil, Rawalpindi District in the Punjab Province of Pakistan.

== Schools in Kaaliyah Saaliyah ==
- Government Boys High School KAHLIAN SIAHLIAN, SAMOOT, KALLAR SYEDAN
