= Walayat Abad =

- Village
- Location within Pakistan
- Coordinates: 33°22′10″N 73°32′21″E
- Country: Pakistan
- UC: Samote
- Tehsil: Kallar Syedan
- District: Rawalpindi
- Time zone: UTC+5 (PST)

Walayat Abad is a village in Samote Union Council of Kallar Syedan Tehsil, Rawalpindi District in the Punjab Province of Pakistan.
