= Qaisar Abbas Khan Magsi =

Pakistani politician

Member of the Provincial Assembly of the Punjab
- In office 21 July 2022 – 14 January 2023
- Preceded by: Muhammad Tahir Randhawa
- Constituency: PP-282 Layyah-III
- In office 1 June 2013 – 31 May 2018
- Preceded by: Himself
- Succeeded by: Muhammad Tahir Randhawa
- Constituency: PP-264 (Layyah-III)
- In office 9 April 2008 – 2013
- Succeeded by: Himself
- Constituency: PP-264 (Layyah-III)

Personal details
- Born: 15 May 1965 (age 61) Layyah District, Punjab, Pakistan
- Party: IPP (2023-present)
- Other political affiliations: PTI (2018-2023); PMLN (2008-2018)

Sardar Qaisar Abbas Khan Magsi is a Pakistani politician who had been a Member of the Provincial Assembly of the Punjab from July 2022 till January 2023. He previously served in this role from April 2008 to April 2013 and from June 2013 to May 2018.

== Early life and education ==
He was born on 15 May 1965 in Layyah District.

He has a degree of Bachelor of Arts which he obtained from Bahauddin Zakariya University.

== Political career ==
He was elected to the Provincial Assembly of the Punjab as a candidate of Pakistan Muslim League (N) (PML-N) from Constituency PP-264 (Layyah-III) in the 2008 Pakistani general election. He received 34,171 votes and defeated Sardar Shahab-ud-Din Khan.

He was re-elected to the Provincial Assembly of the Punjab as a candidate of PML-N from Constituency PP-264 (Layyah-III) in the 2013 Pakistani general election.

In April 2018, he announced to quit PMLN. He joined the Pakistan Tehreek-e-Insaf (PTI) soon after.

He ran for a seat of the Provincial Assembly of the Punjab from PP-282 Layyah-III as a candidate of the PTI in the 2018 Punjab provincial election, but was defeated by Muhammad Tahir Randhawa, an independent candidate.

He was elected to the Provincial Assembly of the Punjab from PP-282 Layyah-III as a candidate of the PTI in the July 2022 Punjab provincial by-election. He defeated Muhammad Tahir Randhawa, a candidate of the PML(N).

On 18 May 2023, he left the PTI due to the 2023 Pakistani protests. He joined the Istehkam-e-Pakistan Party (IPP) on 8 June 2023.
