= PP-226 Lodhran-II =

Constituency of the Punjabi Provincial Legislature, Pakistan

- Constituency for the Provincial Assembly of Punjab
- Region: Kahror Pacca Tehsil (partly) including Kahror Pacca city of Lodhran District

Current constituency
- Created from: PP-209 Lodhran-III (2002-2018); PP-226 Lodhran-III (2018-2023)

PP-226 Lodhran-II (پی پی-226، لودهراں-2) is a Constituency of Provincial Assembly of Punjab.

== General elections 2024 ==
Provincial election 2024: PP-226 Lodhran-II
Party	Candidate	Votes	%	±%
Independent	Razi Ullah Khan (Note: Filed nomination papers as PTI candidate but ECP allowed him to run as an Independent)	65,434	44.05	
PML(N)	Shah Muhammad	60,133	40.48	
PPP	Ashiq Muhammad Khan Joiya	10,088	6.79	
TLP	Rana Muhammad Ahsan	6,098	4.11	
JUI (F)	Muhammad Ur Rahman	2,469	1.66	
Others	Others (fourteen candidates)	3,521	2.91	
Turnout		153,204	53.12	
Total valid votes		148,553	96.96	
Rejected ballots		4,651	3.04	
Majority		5,301	3.57	
Registered electors		288,398		
hold				

== General elections 2018 ==
Provincial election 2018: PP-226 Lodhran-III
Party	Candidate	Votes	%	±%
PML(N)	Shah Muhammad	41,835	41.51	
PTI	Rana Muhammad Faraz Noon	39,347	39.04	
Independent	Raziullah Khan	10,867	10.78	
PPP	Imdad Ullah Abbasi	5,486	5.44	
MMA	Muhammad Umer Farooq	2,028	2.01	
Others	Others (five candidates)	1,231	1.23	
Turnout		103,742	58.15	
Total valid votes		100,794	97.16	
Rejected ballots		2,948	2.84	
Majority		2,488	2.47	
Registered electors		178,419		

== General elections 2013 ==
Provincial election 2013: PP-209 Lodhran-III
Party	Candidate	Votes	%	±%
Independent	Malik Sajjad Hussain Joiya	30,791	37.34	
PML(N)	Mehmood Nawaz Joiya	21,874	26.53	
PTI	Arshad Iqbal	11,900	14.43	
PPP	Imdad Ullah Abasi	11,250	13.64	
Independent	Shah Jahan	3,047	3.69	
PST	Tahir Rasool	2,025	2.46	
MQM-P	Rao Muhammad Tasleem	1,054	1.28	
Others	Others (six candidates)	524	0.64	
Turnout		85,590	63.09	
Total valid votes		82,465	96.35	
Rejected ballots		3,125	3.65	
Majority		8,917	10.81	
Registered electors		135,670		

== General elections 2008 ==
Provincial election 2008: PP-209 Lodhran-III
Party	Candidate	Votes	%	±%
Independent	Rana Muhammed Ijaz Noon	21,010	31.85	
PML(N)	Mehmood Nawaz Joiya	13,631	20.67	
PPP	Rana Muhammed Jahangir Noon	10,915	16.55	
PML(Q)	Malik Muhammed Ajmal Joiya	10,180	15.43	
Independent	Malik Ijaz Wighamal	4,414	6.69	
Mutahidda Majlis-E-Amal	Mian Arshad Iqbal Arain	1,915	2.96	
MQM-P	Muhammed Ashiq Gill	799	1.21	
Others	Others (one candidates)	373	0.57	
Turnout		65,959	62.09	
Total valid votes		63,273	96.35	
Rejected ballots		2,686	3.65	
Majority		7,379	10.81	
Registered electors		105,847		

|}

== See also ==
- PP-225 Lodhran-I
- PP-227 Lodhran-III
