= Mehar Muhammad Aslam Bharwana =

Pakistani politician

Provincial Minister of Punjab for Cooperatives
- In office 13 September 2018 – 2 November 2020
- Succeeded by: Mehar Muhammad Nawaz

Member of the Provincial Assembly of the Punjab
- In office 15 August 2018 – 21 May 2022
- Constituency: PP-127 (Jhang-IV)

Personal details
- Party: IPP (2025-present)
- Other political affiliations: PMLN (2022-2024); PTI (2018-2022)

Mehar Muhammad Aslam Bharwana is a Pakistani politician who served as Provincial Minister of Punjab for Cooperatives, in office from 13 September 2018 to 2 November 2020. He was a member of the Provincial Assembly of the Punjab from August 2018 to May 2022.

== Political career ==
He was elected to the Provincial Assembly of the Punjab as an independent candidate from Constituency PP-127 (Jhang-IV) in the 2018 Punjab provincial election. He received 27,353 votes and defeated Mehar Muhammad Nawaz, a candidate of the Pakistan Tehreek-e-Insaf (PTI).

He joined PTI following his election.

On 12 September 2018, he was inducted into the provincial Punjab cabinet of Chief Minister Usman Buzdar. On 13 September 2018, he was appointed Provincial Minister of Punjab for Cooperatives.

On 2 November 2020, he was removed from his post of Provincial Minister of Punjab for Cooperatives. On 21 May 2022, he was de-seated due to his vote against party policy for the Chief Minister of Punjab election on 16 April 2022.

He ran as a candidate of the PTI in the subsequent by-election, but was unsuccessful. He received 47,413 votes and was defeated by Mehar Muhammad Nawaz, a candidate of the PMLN.
