= Balimah =

- Village
- Location within Pakistan
- Coordinates: 33°23′23″N 73°34′07″E
- Country: Pakistan
- UC: Samote
- Tehsil: Kallar Syedan
- District: Rawalpindi
- Time zone: UTC+5 (PST)

Balimah is a village in Samote Union Council of Kallar Syedan Tehsil, Rawalpindi District in the Punjab Province of Pakistan. It has well regarded natural views. The village often attracts people trying to escape noise from urban areas and offers a wide variety of different animal and insect species.
