= Gangal (Rawalpindi) =

Gangal is a village situated in the administrative sub-division Rawalpindi tehsil of district Rawalpindi, Punjab, Pakistan. |33°24′8″N 72°59′35″E
