= PP-224 Lodhran-I =

Constituency of the Punjabi Provincial Legislature, Pakistan

- Constituency for the Provincial Assembly of Punjab
- Region: Dunyapur Tehsil (partly) including Dunyapur town Lodhran District

Current constituency
- Created from: PP-207 Lodhran-I (2002-2018)
- Replaced by: PP-225 Lodhran-I and PP-228 Lodhran-IV

PP-224 Lodhran-I (پی پی-224، لودهراں-1) was a Constituency of Provincial Assembly of Punjab.It was abolished after 2023 delimitations when Lodhran district lost 1 seat.

== General elections 2018 ==
Provincial election 2018: PP-224 Lodhran-I
Party	Candidate	Votes	%	±%
PTI	Zawar Hussain Warraich	60,872	50.85	
PML(N)	Muhammad Amir Iqbal Shah	48,253	40.31	
PPP	Muhammad Ibrahim	4,609	3.85	
TLP	Muhammad Abdullah Jan	4,334	3.62	
Others	Others (four candidates)	1,631	1.38	
Turnout		121,709	62.11	
Total valid votes		119,699	98.35	
Rejected ballots		2,010	1.65	
Majority		12,619	10.54	
Registered electors		195,961		

== See also ==
- PP-223 Multan-XIII
- PP-225 Lodhran-II
