= Satiana (Jhang) =

Pakistani town

- Village
- Location within Pakistan
- Coordinates: 31°26′06″N 72°29′29″E
- Country: Pakistan
- Province: Punjab
- District: Jhang
- Time zone: UTC+5 (PST)

Satiana is a village located in the Jhang District of Punjab, Pakistan, situated 35 kilometres south of Faisalabad and 20 kilometres north of Tandlianwala.
