= Saaliyah =

Siahlian Umar Khan
- Village
- Siahlian
- Location within Pakistan
- Coordinates: 33°20′5″N 73°33′32″E
- Country: Pakistan
- UC: Samote
- Tehsil: Kallar Syedan
- District: Rawalpindi
- Time zone: UTC+5 (PST)

Saaliyah (also called: Saaliyah Umar Khan is a village in Samote Union Council of Kallar Syedan Tehsil, Rawalpindi District in the Punjab Province of Pakistan.

== Schools in Kaaliyah Saaliyah ==
- Government Boys' high school Kahlian Siahlian, Samoot, Kallar Syedan
