= Syed Muhammad Asghar Shah =

Pakistani politician (1949–2025)

- سید محمد اصغر شاہ

Member of the National Assembly of Pakistan
- In office 1 June 2013 – 31 May 2018
- Constituency: NA-188 (Bahawalnagar-I)

Personal details
- Born: 10 November 1949
- Died: 15 January 2025 (aged 75) Lahore, Punjab, Pakistan

Syed Muhammad Asghar Shah (Urdu: سید محمد اصغرشاه; 10 November 1949 – 15 January 2025) was a Pakistani politician who had been a member of the National Assembly of Pakistan, from 2002 to 2007 and again from June 2013 to May 2018.

== Background ==
Shah was born on 10 November 1949. He died in Lahore, Punjab on 15 January 2025, at the age of 75.

== Political career ==
Shah was elected to the National Assembly of Pakistan as a candidate of Pakistan Muslim League (Q) (PML-Q) from Constituency NA-188 (Bahawalnagar-I) in the 2002 Pakistani general election. He received 77,362 votes and defeated Muhammad Akram Wattoo, a candidate of Pakistan Peoples Party (PPP).

He ran for the seat of the National Assembly as an independent candidate from Constituency NA-188 (Bahawalnagar-I) in the 2008 Pakistani general election but was unsuccessful. He received 40,191 votes and lost the seat to Khadim Hussain Wattoo.

Shah was re-elected to the National Assembly as an independent candidate from Constituency NA-188 (Bahawalnagar-I) in the 2013 Pakistani general election. He received 90,537 votes and defeated Khadim Hussain Wattoo, a candidate of Pakistan Muslim League (N) (PML-N). He joined PML-N after getting elected to the National Assembly. In October 2017, he was appointed Federal Parliamentary Secretary for Water Affairs.

In April 2018, reportedly he announced to quit PML-N. However, he rejected the claims.

He ran for the seat of the National Assembly as a candidate of Pakistan Tehreek-e-Insaf (PTI) from Constituency NA-166 (Bahawalnagar-I) in the 2018 Pakistani general election but was unsuccessful.
