= PP-159 Lahore-XV =

Constituency in Punjab

- Constituency for the Provincial Assembly of Punjab
- Region: Model Town area of Lahore City in Lahore District

Current constituency
- Created: 2018
- Created from: PP-155 Lahore-XIX & PP-156 Lahore XX (2002-2018); PP-159 Lahore-XVI (2018-2023)

PP-159 Lahore-XV (پی پی-159، لاہور-15) is a Constituency of Provincial Assembly of Punjab.

== General elections 2024 ==
Provincial election 2024: PP-159 Lahore-XV
Party	Candidate	Votes	%	±%
PML(N)	Maryam Nawaz	23,604	38.63	
Independent	Mehar Sharafat Ali (Note: Filed nomination papers as PTI candidate but ECP allowed him to run as an Independent)	21,498	35.18	
TLP	Muhammad Hassan Raza Naqshbandi	11,712	19.17	
Others	Others (thirteen candidates)	4,295	7.02	
Turnout		61,969	36.55	
Total valid votes		61,109	98.61	
Rejected ballots		860	1.39	
Majority		2,106	3.45	
Registered electors		169,565		
hold				

== General elections 2018 ==
Provincial election 2018: PP-159 Lahore-XVI
Party	Candidate	Votes	%	±%
PTI	Murad Ross	55,184	49.24	
PML(N)	Muhammad Numan	46,476	41.47	
TLP	Muhammad Imran Akbar	5,438	4.85	
PPP	Mian Muhammad Aslam	2,370	2.12	
MMA	Fasih Ud Din Saif	1,378	1.23	
Others	Others (eleven candidates)	1,221	1.09	
Turnout		113,290	52.32	
Total valid votes		112,067	98.92	
Rejected ballots		1,223	1.08	
Majority		8,708	7.77	
Registered electors		216,535		

== General elections 2013 ==
Provincial election 2013: PP-156 Lahore-XX
Party	Candidate	Votes	%	±%
PML(N)	Ch. Yaseen Sohail	48,227	49.42	
PTI	Ahsan Rasheed	39,528	40.51	
PPP	Iftikhar Ahmad Niazi	2,671	2.74	
Independent	Mubarik Aftab Gill	1,475	1.51	
JI	Waqar Nadeem Warraich	1,407	1.44	
Independent	Maj.(R) Khuda Dad Ch(KD)	1,024	1.05	
Others	Others (twenty four candidates)	3,250	3.33	
Turnout		98,821	54.07	
Total valid votes		97,582	98.75	
Rejected ballots		1,239	1.25	
Majority		8,699	8.91	
Registered electors		182,781		

== General elections 2008 ==
Contesting candidates	Party affiliation	Votes polled

== See also ==
- PP-158 Lahore-XIV
- PP-160 Lahore-XVI
