= Constituency PP-171 (Nankana Sahib-II) =

Former constituency of the Punjabi Provincial Legislature, Pakistan

PP-171 (Nankana Sahib-II)
- Former Provincial constituency for the Provincial Assembly of Punjab

Former constituency
- Abolished: 2018

Constituency PP-171 (Nankana Sahib-II) was a Constituency of Provincial Assembly of Punjab.It was abolished in 2018 delimitations because Nankana Sahib District lost 1 seat after 2017 Census

== General elections 2013 ==
General elections were held on 11 May 2013. Rana Muhammad Arshad Of PMLN won with 37,342 votes and became the member of provincial assembly.

== General elections 2008 ==
Rana Muhammad Arshad Of PMLN won became the member of provincial assembly.

== See also ==
- Punjab, Pakistan
