= PP-281 Layyah-III =

Constituency of the Punjabi Provincial Legislature, Pakistan

- Constituency for the Provincial Assembly of Punjab
- Region: Chaubara Tehsil including Chaubara and Chowk Azam towns and Thal Desert area in Layyah District

Current constituency
- Member: vacant
- Created from: PP-264 Layyah-III (2002-2018); PP-282 Layyah-III (2018-2023)

PP-281 Layyah-III (پی پی-281، ليہ-3) is a Constituency of Provincial Assembly of Punjab.

== General elections 2024 ==
Provincial election 2024: PP-281 Layyah-III
Party	Candidate	Votes	%	±%
Independent	Shoaib Ameer (Note: Filed nomination papers as PTI candidate but ECP allowed him to run as an Independent)	38,721	31.73	
PML(N)	Muhammad Tahir Randhawa	35,432	29.03	
Independent	Qaisar Abbas Khan Magsi	29,005	23.77	
TLP	Jam Manzoor Ahmad	8,448	6.92	
Independent	Rukhsana Shuaib	2,445	2.00	
Others	Others (fourteen candidates)	7,992	6.55	
Turnout		125,886	59.91	
Total valid votes		122,043	96.95	
Rejected ballots		3,843	3.05	
Majority		3,289	2.70	
Registered electors		210,134		
hold				

== General elections 2018 ==
Provincial election 2018: PP-282 Layyah-III
Party	Candidate	Votes	%	±%
Independent	Muhammad Tahir	37,774	35.99	
PTI	Qaiser Abbas Khan	27,179	25.89	
PML(N)	Muhammad Riaz	25,626	24.44	
PPP	Muhammad Rasheed Nasir	3,744	3.57	
TLP	Sajjad Ahmad	3,711	3.54	
Independent	Saqib Ali	2,758	2.63	
Independent	Razzi Abbas Khan	1,303	1.24	
Independent	Malik Shahzad Ahmad	1,263	1.20	
Others	Others (eight candidates)	1,607	1.54	
Turnout		109,109	64.36	
Total valid votes		104,965	96.20	
Rejected ballots		4,144	3.80	
Majority		10,595	10.10	
Registered electors		169,524		

== General elections 2013 ==
Provincial election 2013: PP-264 Layyah-III
Party	Candidate	Votes	%	±%
PML(N)	Qaisar Abbas Khan	29,855	32.05	
Independent	Ghulam Abbas	28,437	30.53	
Independent	Muhammad Bisharat	24,329	26.12	
PTI	Ijaz Ahmed Gill	5,404	5.80	
Independent	Ali Ijaz	3,617	3.88	
Others	Others (eight candidates)	1,515	1.63	
Turnout		97,352	69.47	
Total valid votes		93,157	95.69	
Rejected ballots		4,195	4.31	
Majority		1,418	1.52	
Registered electors		140,126		

== General elections 2008 ==
Contesting candidates	Party affiliation	Votes polled

== See also ==
- PP-280 Layyah-II
- PP-282 Layyah-IV
