= PP-7 Rawalpindi-I =

Constituency of the Punjabi Provincial Legislature, Pakistan

- Constituency for the Provincial Assembly of Punjab
- Region: Kahuta Tehsil and Kallar Syedan Tehsil of Rawalpindi District

Current constituency
- Created from: PP-2 Rawalpindi-II (2002-2018); PP-7 Rawalpindi-II (2018-2023)

PP-7 Rawalpindi-I (پی پی-7، راولپنڈى-1) is a Constituency of Provincial Assembly of Punjab.

== Area ==
- Kahuta Tehsil
- Kallar Syedan Tehsil

== 1985-1988:PP-7 Rawalpindi-VII ==
General elections were held on March 12, 1985.(PP-7 – Rawalpindi) Chaudhary Muhammad Khalid won this seat |-

Contesting candidates	Party affiliation
Chaudhary Muhammad Khalid	Independent

== 1988-1990:PP-7 Rawalpindi-VII ==
General elections were held on November 30, 1988 (PP-7 – Rawalpindi) Chaudhary Muhammad Khalid won this seat

Contesting candidates	Party affiliation
Chaudhary Muhammad Khalid	PPP

== 1990-1993:PP-7 Rawalpindi-VII ==
General elections were held on November 5, 1990 (PP-7 – Rawalpindi) Shaukat Mahmood Bhatti won this seat

Contesting candidates	Party affiliation
Shaukat Mahmood Bhatti	IJI

== 1993-1997:PP-7 Rawalpindi-VII ==
General elections were held on November 30, 1993 (PP-7 – Rawalpindi) Chaudhary Muhammad Khalid won this seat

Contesting candidates	Party affiliation
Chaudhary Muhammad Khalid	PPP

== 1997-2002:PP-7 Rawalpindi-VII ==
General elections were held on February 18, 1997 (PP-7 – Rawalpindi) Shaukat Mahmood Bhatti won this seat

Contesting candidates	Party affiliation
Shaukat Mahmood Bhatti	PML-N

== 2002-2008:PP-7 Rawalpindi-VII ==
General elections were held on November 25, 2002. Musharraf held the presidency from 2001 until 2008,

== 2008—2013: PP-2 Rawalpindi-II ==
General elections were held on 18 February 2008.Muhammad Shafiq Khan won this seat with 30,718 votes.

Provincial election 2008: PP-2 Rawalpindi-II
Party	Candidate	Votes	%	±%
PML(Q)	Muhammad Shafiq Khan	30,718	32.29	
PML(N)	Mrs. Umar Farooq	29,458	30.97	
Independent	Ch. Muhammad Kamran Ali Khan	19,918	20.94	
PPP	Askari Hassan Syed	12,550	13.19	
MMA	Hafiz Muhammad Haroon	2,293	2.41	
Independent	Malik Muhamad Khalid Advocate	187	0.20	
Turnout		98,209	58.57	
Total valid votes		95,124	96.86	
Rejected ballots		3,085	3.14	
Majority		1,260	1.32	
Registered electors		167,688		

== 2013—2018:PP-2 Rawalpindi-II ==
General elections were held on 11 May 2013. Raja Muhammad Ali won this seat with 43,335 votes.

Provincial election 2013: PP-2 Rawalpindi-II
Party	Candidate	Votes	%	±%
PML(N)	Raja Muhammad Ali	43,335	37.89	
Independent	Raja Sagheer Ahmed	38,706	33.84	
PPP	Muhmmad Shabbir Awan	15,868	13.87	
PTI	Tariq Mehmood Murtaza	13,233	11.57	
JI	lbrar Hussain Abbasi	1,760	1.54	
JUI (F)	Raja Tariq Mehmood	1,047	0.92	
Others	Others (five candidates)	428	0.37	
Turnout		118,288	55.19	
Total valid votes		114,377	96.69	
Rejected ballots		3,911	3.31	
Majority		3,629	4.05	
Registered electors		214,320		

== 2018—2022: PP-7 Rawalpindi-II ==
General elections were scheduled to be held on 25 July 2018. In 2018 Pakistani general election, Raja Sagheer Ahmad, an Independent politician won PP-7 Rawalpindi II election by taking 44,363 votes.

Provincial election 2018: PP-7 Rawalpindi-II
Party	Candidate	Votes	%	±%
Independent	Raja Sagheer Ahmed	44,363	28.78	
PML(N)	Raja Muhammad Ali	42,459	27.54	
PTI	Ghulam Murtaza Satti	40,528	26.29	
TLP	Mansoor Zahoor	15,068	9.78	
PPP	Chaudhary Mohammad Ayub	9,259	6.01	
MMA	Tanwir Ahmed	2,476	1.61	
Turnout		159,973	53.52	
Total valid votes		154,153	96.36	
Rejected ballots		5,820	3.64	
Majority		1,904	1.24	
Registered electors		298,908		

== 2022-2023: PP-7 Rawalpindi-II ==
PML-N's Raja Sagheer Ahmed won the seat with 68,906 votes, however, PTI’s Muhammad Shabbir Awan managed to 68,857 votes.

2022 Punjab provincial by-election: PP-7 Rawalpindi-II
Party	Candidate	Votes	%	±%
PML(N)	Raja Sagheer Ahmed	68,918	43.29	
PTI	Muhammad Shabbir Awan	68,863	43.27	▲
TLP	Manzoor Zahoor	14,776	9.28	▼
JI	Tanveer Ahmed	1,666	1.05	▼
IND	2 candidates	3,436	2.15	▼
Majority		55	0.02	▼
Rejected ballots		1,475	0.95	
Turnout		1,59,143	47.46	▲

== 2024-2029: PP-7 Rawalpindi-I ==
Provincial election 2024: PP-7 Rawalpindi-I
Party	Candidate	Votes	%	±%
PML(N)	Raja Sagheer Ahmed	66,356	37.30	
Independent	Muhammad Shabbir Awan (Note: Filed nomination papers as PTI candidate but ECP allowed him to run as an Independent)	63,042	35.43	
TLP	Raja Waseem Ahmed	22,103	12.42	
Independent	Raja Nadeem Ahmed	8,952	5.03	
PPP	Chaudary Zaheer Mahmood	6,870	3.86	
JI	Tanwir Ahmed	2,920	1.64	
Independent	Sardar Taifoor Akhtar	2,859	1.61	
Others	Others (fifteen candidates)	4,817	2.71	
Turnout		191,771	49.67	
Total valid votes		177,919	92.78	
Rejected ballots		13,852	7.22	
Majority		3,314	1.87	
Registered electors		386,073		
hold				

== See also ==
- NA-51 Murree-cum-Rawalpindi
- PP-6 Murree
- PP-8 Rawalpindi-II
