= NA-160 Bahawalnagar-I =

Constituency of the National Assembly of Pakistan

- Constituency for the National Assembly of Pakistan
- Region: Minchinabad Tehsil and Bahawalnagar Tehsil (partly) of Bahawalnagar District
- Electorate: 441,348

Current constituency
- Party: Pakistan Muslim League (N)
- Member: Abdul Ghaffar Wattoo
- Created from: NA-188 Bahawalnagar-I

NA-160 Bahawalnagar-I (این اے-160، بہاولنگر-۱) is a constituency for the National Assembly of Pakistan.

== Election 2002 ==
General elections were held on 10 October 2002. Syed Muhammad Asgher Shah of PML-Q won by 77,362 votes.

General election 2002: NA-188 Bahawalnagar-I
Party	Candidate	Votes	%	±%
PML(Q)	Syed Muhammad Asghar Shah	77,362	61.31	
PPP	Mian Muhammad Akram Wattoo	21,733	17.22	
MMA	Moenu Ud Din Wattoo	19,062	15.11	
PML(N)	Ahmed Farid Chishti	8,020	6.36	
Turnout		130,560	45.09	
Total valid votes		126,177	96.64	
Rejected ballots		4,383	3.36	
Majority		55,629	44.09	
Registered electors		289,582		

== Election 2008 ==
General elections were held on 18 February 2008. Muhammad Akhtar Khadim Alias of PML-Q won by 52,981 votes.

General election 2008: NA-188 Bahawalnagar-I
Party	Candidate	Votes	%	±%
PML(Q)	Muhammad Akhter Khadam Alias Khadam Hussain	52,981	37.10	
PPP	Shokat Ali Joyia Laleka	44,861	31.42	
Independent	Syed Muhammad Asghar Shah	40,191	28.15	
Others	Others (two candidates)	4,766	3.33	
Turnout		148,341	54.99	
Total valid votes		142,799	96.26	
Rejected ballots		5,542	3.74	
Majority		8,120	5.68	
Registered electors		269,766		
PML(Q) hold				

== Election 2013 ==
General elections were held on 11 May 2013. Syed Muhammad Asghar Shah, an independent candidate, won by 90,537 votes and became the member of National Assembly. He joined PML-N after his election.

General election 2013: NA-188 Bahawalnagar-I
Party	Candidate	Votes	%	±%
Independent	Syed Muhammad Asghar Shah	90,537	45.79	
PML(N)	Muhammad Akhter Khadam Alias Khadam Hussain	89,262	45.14	
Others	Others (eight candidates)	17,939	9.07	
Turnout		207,100	68.20	
Total valid votes		197,738	95.48	
Rejected ballots		9,392	4.52	
Majority		1,275	0.65	
Registered electors		303,678		
Independent gain from PML(Q)				

== Election 2018 ==
General elections were held on 25 July 2018.

General election 2018: NA-166 Bahawalnagar-I
Party	Candidate	Votes	%	±%
Independent	Abdul Ghaffar Wattoo	102,385	46.47	
PTI	Syed Muhammad Asghar Shah	93,291	42.34	
TLP	Muhammad Arshad Khan	18,109	8.22	
PPP	Nazia Ayub	4,128	1.87	
Independent	Syed Nazar Mehmmod Shah	1,630	0.74	
Independent	Shah Sawar	786	0.36	
Turnout		225,507	63.16	
Total valid votes		220,329	97.70	
Rejected ballots		5,178	2.30	
Majority		9,094	4.13	
Registered electors		356,995		

== Election 2024 ==
General elections were held on 8 February 2024. Abdul Ghaffar Wattoo won the election with 118,557 votes. {{Election box gain with party link no swing|Winner=Pakistan Muslim League (N)

General election 2024: NA-160 Bahawalnagar-I
Party	Candidate	Votes	%	±%
Pakistan Muslim League – Nawaz	Muhammed abdul ghaffar watto	118,116		
Independent	Syed Muhammad Asghar Shah	110,492	42.14	
TLP	Saad Hussain Rizvi	21953	8.38	▼1,56
PTI	Noor Muhammad Ghifari (Note: Filed nomination papers as PTI candidate but ECP allowed him to run as an Independent)	8449	3.24	▼39.10
Others	Others (seven candidates)	2,717	1.04	
Turnout		269,235	61.00	▼2.16
Total valid votes		262,231	97.40	
Rejected ballots		7,004	2.60	
Majority		8,065	3.08	
Registered electors		441,348		

== See also ==
- NA-159 Vehari-IV
- NA-161 Bahawalnagar-II
