= Mian Fida Hussain Wattoo =

Pakistani politician

Member of the Provincial Assembly of the Punjab
- Incumbent
- Assumed office 24 February 2024
- Constituency: PP-237 Bahawalnagar-I
- In office 15 August 2018 – 21 May 2022
- Constituency: PP-237 Bahawalnagar-I
- In office 1 June 2013 – 20 March 2013
- Constituency: PP-277 (Bahawalnagar-I)
- In office 3 July 2008 – 31 May 2018
- Constituency: PP-277 (Bahawalnagar-I)

Personal details
- Born: Bahawalpur, Punjab, Pakistan
- Party: PML(Z) (2025-present)
- Other political affiliations: PMLN (2022-2025); PTI (2018-2022); IND (2018); PMLN (2008-2013)
- Relations: Khadim Hussain Wattoo (brother)

Punjab Assembly Lahore

Mian Fida Hussain Wattoo is a Pakistani politician who is a Member of the Provincial Assembly of the Punjab, from February 2024 until now. He has been Member of the Provincial Assembly of the Punjab, from July 2008 to March 2013, from June 2013 to May 2018, from July 2018 to May 2022 and from July 2022 to January 2023.

== Early life ==
He was born on 1 January 1960 in Bahawalnagar.

== Political career ==
He was elected to the Provincial Assembly of the Punjab as a candidate for Pakistan Muslim League (N) (PML-N) for Constituency PP-277 (Bahawalnagar-I) in by-polls held in June 2008. He received 32,706 votes.

He was re-elected to the Provincial Assembly of the Punjab as a candidate for PML-N for Constituency PP-277 (Bahawalnagar-I) in the 2013 Pakistani general election.

In December 2013, he was appointed Parliamentary Secretary for forestry, wildlife.

He was re-elected to Provincial Assembly of the Punjab as an independent candidate from Constituency PP-237 (Bahawalnagar-I) in the 2018 Pakistani general election.

He joined Pakistan Tehreek-e-Insaf (PTI) following 2018 election. He de-seated due to vote against party policy for Chief Minister of Punjab election on 16 April 2022.

He was re-elected on July 17, 2022, as a Member of Provincial Assembly of Punjab from Constituency PP-237.

He won 2024 general elections from Constituency PP-237 with the margin of 16,649 votes.
