= Muhammad Asif Malik =

Pakistani politician (born 1970)

Member of the Provincial Assembly of the Punjab
- In office 2002 – 31 May 2018

Personal details
- Born: 2 August 1970 (age 56) Khushab, Punjab, Pakistan
- Party: PMLN (2008-present)

Muhammad Asif Malik is a Pakistani politician who was a Member of the Provincial Assembly of the Punjab, from 2002 to May 2018.

== Early life and education ==
He was born on 2 August 1970 in Khushab.

He graduated from University of the Punjab in 1993. He has the degree of Bachelor of Arts and a degree of the Bachelor of Laws.

== Political career ==
He was elected to the Provincial Assembly of the Punjab as a candidate of Pakistan Muslim League (Q) from Constituency PP-41 (Khushab-III) in the 2002 Pakistani general election. He received 19,569 votes and defeated Abdul Rehman Tiwana, an independent candidate.

He was re-elected to the Provincial Assembly of the Punjab as an independent candidate from Constituency PP-41 (Khushab-III) in the 2008 Pakistani general election. He received 27,338 votes and defeated Malik Muhammad Ehsan Ullah Tiwana, an independent candidate.

He was re-elected to the Provincial Assembly of the Punjab as a candidate of Pakistan Muslim League (N) (PML-N) from Constituency PP-41 (Khushab-III) in the 2013 Pakistani general election. In June 2013, he was inducted into the provincial cabinet of Chief Minister Shahbaz Sharif and was made Provincial Minister of Punjab for Forestry, Wildlife and Fisheries. He remained Minister for Forestry, Wildlife and Fisheries until November 2016. In a cabinet reshuffle in November 2016, he was made Provincial Minister of Punjab for Archaeology.
