= Nazir Ahmad Khan (Pakistani politician) =

Pakistani politician

Member of the Provincial Assembly of the Punjab
- In office 15 August 2018 – 21 May 2022
- Constituency: PP-228 (Lodhran-V)

Personal details
- Party: TLP (2025-present)
- Other political affiliations: IPP (2023-2025); PMLN (2022-2023); PTI (2018-2022)

Nazir Ahmad Khan is a Pakistani politician who has been a member of the Provincial Assembly of the Punjab from August 2018 till May 2022.

== Political career ==
He was elected to the Provincial Assembly of the Punjab as a candidate of Pakistan Tehreek-e-Insaf from Constituency PP-228 (Lodhran-V) in the 2018 Pakistani general election. He de-seated due to vote against party policy for Chief Minister of Punjab election on 16 April 2022.
