= Gangal (Jhelum) =

Village in Jhelum, Punjab, Pakistan

Gangal is a village in the Sohawa tehsil of Jhelum District, Punjab, Pakistan.

|32°53′35″N 73°25′39″E
