= Raja Muhammad Ali =

Pakistani politician

Member of the Provincial Assembly of the Punjab
- In office 29 May 2013 – 31 May 2018

Personal details
- Born: 2 July 1977 (age 49) Rawalpindi
- Party: Pakistan Muslim League (N)
- Parent: Raja Muhammad Zafar ul Haq (father)

Raja Muhammad Ali is a Pakistani politician who was a Member of the Provincial Assembly of the Punjab, from 2002 to 2007 and again from May 2013 to May 2018. He served as Special Assistant to the Chief Minister of Punjab and Chairman of standing committee on planning and development. He was member, board of governors at University of Wah. He is an Advocate High Court. He has also served as Visiting Assistant Professor of law at International Islamic University Islamabad. He is serving as Assistant Secretary General of World Muslim Congress.

== Early life and education ==
He was born on 2 July 1977 in Rawalpindi to Raja Muhammad Zafar ul Haq.

He has a degree of Bachelor of Laws which he obtained from University of the Punjab.

== Political career ==
He was elected to the Provincial Assembly of the Punjab as a candidate of Pakistan Muslim League (N) (PML-N) from Constituency PP-2 (Rawalpindi-II) in the 2002 Pakistani general election. He received 37,380 votes and defeated Muhammad Shabbir Awan, a candidate of Pakistan Peoples Party (PPP).

He ran for the seat of the Provincial Assembly of the Punjab as a candidate for PML-N for Constituency PP-2 (Rawalpindi-II) in the 2008 Pakistani general election but was unsuccessful. He received 30,962 votes and lost the seat to Muhammad Shabbir Awan, a candidate of PPP.

He was re-elected to the Provincial Assembly of the Punjab as a candidate for PML-N for Constituency PP-2 (Rawalpindi-II) in the 2013 Pakistani general election.

He has served as Special Assistant to the Chief Minister of Punjab (Provincial Cabinet Member) and Chairman of standing committee on planning and development. He was member board of governors at University of Wah. He is an Advocate High Court. He has also served as Visiting Assistant Professor of law at International Islamic University Islamabad. He is serving as Assistant Secretary General of World Muslim Congress
