= PP-171 Lahore-XXVII =

Constituency of the Punjabi Provincial Legislature, Pakistan

- Constituency for the Provincial Assembly of Punjab
- Region: Lahore City in Lahore District

Current constituency
- Created: 2002
- Created from: PP-140 Lahore-IV (2002-2018); PP-170 Lahore-XXVII (2018-2023)

PP-171 Lahore-XXVII (پی پی-171، لاہور-27) is a Constituency of Provincial Assembly of Punjab.

== General elections 2024 ==
Provincial election 2024: PP-171 Lahore-XXVII
Party	Candidate	Votes	%	±%
Independent	Mian Aslam Iqbal (Note: Filed nomination papers as PTI candidate but ECP allowed him to run as an Independent)	61,862	52.40	
PML(N)	Mehr Ishtiaq Ahmad Anwar	36,955	31.30	
TLP	Ijaz Bashir Chaudhry	9,514	8.06	
Independent	Bajash Khan Niazi	3,514	2.98	
Others	Others (twenty candidates)	6,221	5.26	
Turnout		120,792	39.05	
Total valid votes		118,066	97.74	
Rejected ballots		2,726	2.26	
Majority		24,907	21.10	
Registered electors		309,297		
hold				

== General elections 2018 ==
Provincial election 2018: PP-170 Lahore-XXVII
Party	Candidate	Votes	%	±%
PTI	Muhammad Amin Zulqernain	25,215	47.16	
PML(N)	Imran Javaid	20,765	38.83	
PPP	Muhammad Asif	3,366	6.30	
TLP	Sheikh Muhammad Imran Ishfaq	2,584	4.83	
MMA	Ch. Mehmood UI Ahad	1,446	2.70	
Others	Others (nine candidates)	95	0.18	
Turnout		54,748	54.47	
Total valid votes		53,471	97.61	
Rejected ballots		1,277	2.39	
Majority		4,450	8.33	
Registered electors		100,506		

== General elections 2013 ==
Provincial election 2013: PP-140 Lahore-IV
Party	Candidate	Votes	%	±%
PML(N)	Majid Zahoor	37,615	53.76	
PTI	Muhammad Zubair Khan Niazi	28,243	40.37	
PPP	Afshan	1,184	1.69	
JI	Khalique Ahmad Butt	1,025	1.47	
Others	Others (twelve candidates)	1,896	2.71	
Turnout		70,658	52.69	
Total valid votes		69,963	99.02	
Rejected ballots		695	0.98	
Majority		9,372	13.39	
Registered electors		134,108		

== See also ==
- PP-170 Lahore-XXVI
- PP-172 Lahore-XXVIII
