= Dunyapur Tehsil =

Coordinates: 29°48′06″N 71°44′27″E

Dunyapur Tehsil تحصیل دنیا پور
- Tehsil
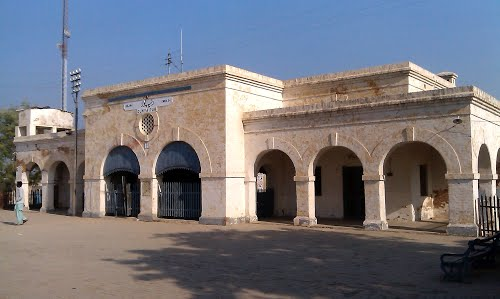
- Dunyapur Railway Station
- Interactive map of Dunyapur Tehsil
- Country: Pakistan
- Region: (Punjab, Pakistan) Punjab
- District: Lodhran
- Established: 1889

Government
  - Type: Local government

Population (2017)
  - Tehsil: 495,013
  - Urban: 41,575
  - Rural: 453,438
- Time zone: PST
  - Summer (DST): PDT
- Website: www.tmadunyapur.com

Dunyapur is a tehsil of the Lodhran District of Punjab, Pakistan. Adda Zakhira is Situated on its East side, Multan on the west side, Lodhran city, and Bahawalpur city are situated on the south side. According to the 2017 Census of Pakistan, Dunyapur Tehsil has a population of 495,013.
