= PP-168 Lahore-XXIV =

Constituency of the Provincial Assembly of Punjab, Pakistan

- Constituency for the Provincial Assembly of Punjab
- Region: Lahore City in Lahore District

Current constituency
- Created from: PP-150 Lahore-XIV (2002-2018); PP-167 Lahore-XXIV (2018-2023)

PP-168 Lahore-XXIV (پی پی-168، لاہور-24) is a Constituency of Provincial Assembly of Punjab.

== General elections 2024 ==
Provincial election 2024: PP-168 Lahore-XXIV
Party	Candidate	Votes	%	±%
PML(N)	Faisal Ayub	32,730	44.83	
Independent	Malik Nadeem Abbas (Note: Filed nomination papers as PTI candidate but ECP allowed him to run as an Independent)	27,590	37.79	
TLP	Ghulam Sarwar	5,767	7.90	
JI	Zikrullah Mujahid	3,691	5.06	
Others	Others (thirteen candidates)	3,240	4.42	
Turnout		74,273	43.69	
Total valid votes		73,018	98.31	
Rejected ballots		1,255	1.69	
Majority		5,140	7.04	
Registered electors		170,004		
hold				

== General elections 2018 ==
Provincial election 2018: PP-167 Lahore-XXIV
Party	Candidate	Votes	%	±%
PTI	Nazir Ahmad Chohan	40,680	43.67	
PML(N)	Mian Muhammad Saleem	38,444	41.27	
TLP	Khaleeq Ahmad Awan	6,286	6.75	
AAT	Khalid Naik	2,905	3.12	
PPP	Muhammad Aslam Pervaiz	2,788	2.99	
Others	Others (four candidates)	2,061	2.22	
Turnout		94,977	54.19	
Total valid votes		93,164	98.09	
Rejected ballots		1,813	1.91	
Majority		2,236	2.40	
Registered electors		175,279		

== General elections 2013 ==
Provincial election 2013: PP-150 Lahore-XIV
Party	Candidate	Votes	%	±%
PML(N)	Mehar Ishtiaq Ahmad	57,232	58.33	
PTI	Mehar Wajid Azeem	34,219	34.88	
PPP	Asif Mehmood Nagra	3,805	3.88	
JUI (F)	Mian Muhammad Asif	1,018	1.04	
Others	Others (twenty three candidates)	1,839	1.87	
Turnout		99,690	51.27	
Total valid votes		98,113	98.42	
Rejected ballots		1,577	1.58	
Majority		23,013	23.45	
Registered electors		194,426		

== General elections 2008 ==
Contesting candidates	Party affiliation	Votes polled

== See also ==
- PP-167 Lahore-XXIII
- PP-169 Lahore-XXV
