= Muhammad Shabbir Awan =

Pakistani politician

Member of the Provincial Assembly of the Punjab
- In office 18 February 2008 – 2013

Personal details
- Born: 11 May 1952 (age 74) Samote, Rawalpindi, Punjab
- Party: PTI (2013-present)
- Other political affiliations: PPP (2008-2013)
- Parent: Malik Muhammad Salis (father)

Muhammad Shabbir Awan is a Pakistani politician who had been a member of the Provincial Assembly of the Punjab from 2008 to 2013.

== Early life and education ==
Lt. Col (R) Muhammad Shabbir Awan was born on 11 May 1952 in Village Sambal, UC Samote, Kallar Syedan Tehsil Of Rawalpindi District He graduated from the University of Balochistan, Quetta. He is also a graduate of Command and Staff College, Quetta and obtained the Degree of BSc (Hons) in War Studies in 1986.

== Previous official position ==
Lt. Col (R) Muhammad Shabbir Awan was commissioned in Pakistan Army in 1972. He retired from Pakistan Army as lieutenant colonel in 1999 and was Awarded Tamgha-e-Imtiaz in recognition to his Meritorious Services.

== Political career ==
He was elected to the Provincial Assembly of the Punjab as a Candidate of PPPP from Constituency PP-2 in the 2008 Pakistani general election. He received 32,816 votes and defeated Raja Muhammad Ali, a candidate of Pakistan Muslim League (N) (PML-N). He Was functioning as Chairman, Standing Committee on Planning and Development.

In the 2013 Pakistani general election, Lt. Col (R) Muhammad Shabbir Awan was a candidate For Provincial Assembly of the Punjab from PPPP for Constituency PP-2 but was unsuccessful. He received 15,868 votes and lost the seat to Raja Muhammad Ali a candidate of PML-N.

Lt. Col (R) Muhammad Shabbir Awan joined PTI on 19 December 2013.

In the 2024 general election, Muhammad Shabbir Awan was a candidate for Provincial Assembly of the Punjab as Independent Candidate (Backed by PTI) for Constituency PP-2 but was unsuccessful.
