= PP-237 Bahawalnagar-I =

Constituency of the Punjabi Provincial Legislature, Pakistan

- Constituency for the Provincial Assembly of Punjab
- Region: Minchinabad Tehsil (partly) including Minchinabad city of Bahawalnagar District

Current constituency
- Created from: PP-277 Bahawalnagar-I (2002-2018); PP-237 Bahawalnagar-I (2018-)

PP-237 Bahawalnagar-I (پی پی-237، بہاولنگر-1) is a Constituency of Provincial Assembly of Punjab.

== General elections 2024 ==
Provincial election 2024: PP-237 Bahawalnagar-I
Party	Candidate	Votes	%	±%
PML(N)	Fida Hussain	69,072	49.95	
Independent	Mian Rashid Mehmood Wattoo	52,115	37.69	
TLP	Abdul Raziq Shah	8,795	6.36	
Independent	Syed Asif Khan Bukhari (Note: Filed nomination papers as PTI candidate but ECP allowed him to run as an Independent)	3,943	2.85	
Independent	Fakhar UI Din	2,426	1.75	
Others	Others (four candidates)	1,925	1.40	
Turnout		141,344	62.00	
Total valid votes		138,276	97.83	
Rejected ballots		3,068	2.17	
Majority		16,957	12.26	
Registered electors		227,978		
hold				

== General elections 2018 ==
Provincial election 2018: PP-237 Bahawalnagar-I
Party	Candidate	Votes	%	±%
Independent	Fida Hussain	56,862	47.74	
PTI	Muhammad Tariq Usman	47,763	40.10	
TLP	Syed Ahmad Shah	12,913	10.84	
Others	Others (four candidates)	1,574	1.32	
Turnout		121,927	65.03	
Total valid votes		119,112	97.69	
Rejected ballots		2,815	2.31	
Majority		9,099	7.64	
Registered electors		187,490		

== General elections 2013 ==
Provincial election 2013: PP-277 Bahawalnagar-I
Party	Candidate	Votes	%	±%
PML(N)	Fida Hussain	47,357	44.30	
Independent	Muhammad Tariq Usman Gadhoka Watoo	42,763	40.00	
PST	Syed Ahmad Shah	12,931	12.10	
Others	Others (twelve candidates)	3,846	3.60	
Turnout		112,114	70.95	
Total valid votes		106,897	95.35	
Rejected ballots		5,217	4.65	
Majority		4,594	4.30	
Registered electors		158,022		

== General elections 2008 ==
Contesting candidates	Party affiliation	Votes polled

== See also ==
- PP-236 Vehari-VIII
- PP-238 Bahawalnagar-II
