= Zawar Hussain Warraich =

British-Pakistani politician

Provincial Minister of Punjab for Prisons
- In office 13 September 2018 – 2 November 2020

Member of the Provincial Assembly of the Punjab
- In office 15 August 2018 – 20 May 2022
- Constituency: PP-224 (Lodhran-I)

Personal details
- Party: IPP (2024-present)
- Other political affiliations: PMLN (2022-2024); PTI (2018-2022)

Zawar Hussain Warraich is a Pakistani politician who served as the Provincial Minister of Punjab for Prisons, in office from 13 September 2018 to 2 November 2020. He had been a member of the Provincial Assembly of the Punjab from August 2018 till May 2022.

== Political career ==
He was elected to the Provincial Assembly of the Punjab as a candidate of Pakistan Tehreek-e-Insaf (PTI) from Constituency PP-224 (Lodhran-I) in 2018 Pakistani general election.

On 12 September 2018, he was inducted into the provincial Punjab cabinet of Chief Minister Sardar Usman Buzdar. On 13 September 2018, he was appointed as Provincial Minister of Punjab for Prisons.

On 2 November 2020, He was removed from his post of Provincial Minister of Punjab for Prisons.

He de-seated due to vote against party policy for Chief Minister of Punjab election on 16 April 2022.
