= PP-131 Jhang-VII =

Constituency of the Provincial Assembly of Punjab, Pakistan

- Constituency for the Provincial Assembly of Punjab
- Region: Athara Hazari Tehsil, Ahmedpur Sial Tehsil (partly) and Jhang Tehsil (partly) of Jhang District

Current constituency
- Created from: PP-76 Jhang-IV (2002-2018); PP-125 Jhang-II (2018-2023)

PP-131 Jhang-VII (پی پی-131، جھنگ-7) is a constituency of the Provincial Assembly of Punjab, Pakistan.

== General elections 2024 ==
Provincial election 2024: PP-131 Jhang-VII
Party	Candidate	Votes	%	±%
Independent	Mian Muhammad Azam (Note: Filed nomination papers as PTI candidate but ECP allowed him to run as an Independent)	73,239	49.43	
PML(N)	Faisal Hayat	59,578	40.21	
TLP	Ahsan Ullah	6,995	4.72	
PPP	Syed Maratab Ali Shah	2,165	1.46	
Others	Others (sixteen candidates)	6,191	4.18	
Turnout		152,581	60.96	
Total valid votes		148,168	97.11	
Rejected ballots		4,413	2.89	
Majority		13,661	9.22	
Registered electors		250,311		
hold				

== General elections 2018 ==
Provincial election 2018: PP-125 Jhang-II
Party	Candidate	Votes	%	±%
Independent	Faisal Hayat	51,050	42.47	
PTI	Mian Muhammad Azam	38,699	32.19	
Independent	Muhammad Javaid Akbar	12,162	10.12	
Independent	Iqbal Anmad Khan	8,315	6.92	
TLP	Umar Hayat	4,048	3.37	
MMA	Ch. Sajid Ali Chadhar	3,779	3.14	
Independent	Fakhar Abbas	1,524	1.27	
Others	Others (four candidates)	628	0.53	
Turnout		125,885	63.54	
Total valid votes		120,205	95.49	
Rejected ballots		5,680	4.51	
Majority		12,351	10.28	
Registered electors		198,117		

== General elections 2013 ==
Provincial election 2013: PP-76 Jhang-IV
Party	Candidate	Votes	%	±%
PML(N)	Muhmmad Saqlain Anwar Sipra	28,396	29.16	
Independent	Mehr Muhammad Nawaz Khan Bharwana	28,136	28.89	
PTI	Muhammad Abuzar Bharwana	13,432	13.79	
Independent	Mehr Muhammad Sarfaraz Khan Jappa	12,330	12.66	
Independent	Ch. Qamar Aftab Chaddhar	9,365	9.62	
Independent	Ijaz Hussain	2,408	2.47	
JI	Mian Abdul Razaq Hanjra	1,431	1.47	
Others	Others (seven candidates)	1,888	1.94	
Turnout		101,664	65.10	
Total valid votes		97,386	95.79	
Rejected ballots		4,278	4.21	
Majority		260	0.27	
Registered electors		156,162		

== General elections 2008 ==
Contesting candidates	Party affiliation	Votes polled

== See also ==
- PP-130 Jhang-VI
- PP-132 Nankana Sahib-I
