= PP-141 Sheikhupura-VI =

Constituency of the Provincial Assembly of Punjab, Pakistan

- Constituency for the Provincial Assembly of Punjab
- Region: Sheikhupura city of Sheikhupura District

Current constituency
- Created from: PP-167 Sheikhupura-VI (2002-2018); PP-140 Sheikhupura-VI (2018-2023)

PP-141 Sheikhupura-VI (پی پی-141، شيخوپورہ-6) is a Constituency of Provincial Assembly of Punjab.

== General elections 2024 ==
Provincial election 2024: PP-141 Sheikhupura-VI
Party	Candidate	Votes	%	±%
Independent	Tayyab Rashid (Note: Filed nomination papers as PTI candidate but ECP allowed him to run as an Independent)	61,509	49.65	
PML(N)	Amjad Latif	38,620	31.17	
TLP	Muhammad Arshad	14,216	11.47	
Independent	Shakoor Hussain Virk	3,119	2.52	
Others	Others (twenty six candidates)	6,432	5.19	
Turnout		126,541	47.81	
Total valid votes		123,896	97.91	
Rejected ballots		2,645	2.09	
Majority		22,889	18.48	
Registered electors		264,675		
hold				

== General elections 2018 ==
Provincial election 2018: PP-140 Sheikhupura-VI
Party	Candidate	Votes	%	±%
PTI	Mian Khalid Mehmood	32,965	30.68	
PML(N)	Yasir Iqbal	26,046	24.24	
Independent	Tayyab Rashid	22,659	21.09	
TLP	Qaiser Zahoor Gondal	11,277	10.50	
MMA	Khalid Mahmood Virk	4,490	4.18	
PPP	Syed Nadeem Abbas	4,446	4.14	
AAT	Shehzad Asghar Basra	1,643	1.53	
Independent	Javed Iqbal	1,289	1.20	
Others	Others (nineteen candidates)	2,640	2.44	
Turnout		109,449	54.46	
Total valid votes		107,455	98.18	
Rejected ballots		1,994	1.82	
Majority		6,919	6.44	
Registered electors		200,981		

== General elections 2013 ==
Provincial election 2013: PP-167 Sheikhupura-VI
Party	Candidate	Votes	%	±%
PML(N)	Muhammad Arif Khan Sindhla	41,573	40.79	
PTI	Haji Muhammad Shafique	19,621	19.25	
Independent	Mian Khalid Mehmood	11,963	11.74	
PST	Rana Abdul Sammi	6,349	6.23	
Independent	Syed Raza Hussain Babar Rizvi	5,826	5.72	
PPP	Mian Muhammad Pervez	5,716	5.61	
MDM	Hafiz Muhammad Ashfaq Gujjar	3,298	3.24	
Independent	Seith Ghulam Rasool Rehmani	2,212	2.17	
JI	Sheikh Jamil	1,642	1.61	
Independent	Seith Abdul Khaliq Rehmani	1,119	1.10	
Others	Others (thirty one candidates)	2,604	2.55	
Turnout		104,554	53.64	
Total valid votes		101,923	97.48	
Rejected ballots		2,631	2.52	
Majority		21,952	21.54	
Registered electors		194,921		

== General elections 2008 ==
Contesting candidates	Party affiliation	Votes polled

== See also ==
- PP-140 Sheikhupura-V
- PP-142 Sheikhupura-VII
