= List of members of the 18th Provincial Assembly of the Punjab =

The 18th Provincial Assembly of Punjab is the legislature of Punjab, Pakistan following the 2024 provincial election to the Provincial Assembly of the Punjab.

== Members ==
District	Constituency name	Party	Member	Ref
Attock	PP-1 Attock-I	Sunni Ittehad Council	Qazi Ahmed Akbar	
Attock	PP-2 Attock-II	Sunni Ittehad Council	Sardar Mohammad Ali Khan	
Attock	PP-3 Attock-III	Sunni Ittehad Council	Ejaz Hussain Bukhari	
Attock	PP-4 Attock-IV	Pakistan Muslim League (N)	Chaudhry Sher Ali Khan	
Attock	PP-5 Attock-V	Pakistan Muslim League (N)	Malik Aitbar Khan	
Murree	PP-6 Murree	Pakistan Muslim League (N)	Muhammad Bilal Yamin	
Rawalpindi	PP-7 Rawalpindi-I	Pakistan Muslim League (N)	Raja Sagheer Ahmed	
Rawalpindi	PP-8 Rawalpindi-II	Sunni Ittehad Council	Chaudhary Javed Kausar	
Rawalpindi	PP-9 Rawalpindi-III	Pakistan Muslim League (N)	Raja Shoukat Aziz Bhatti	
Rawalpindi	PP-10 Rawalpindi-IV	Pakistan Muslim League (N)	Naeem Ejaz	
Rawalpindi	PP-11 Rawalpindi-V	Pakistan Muslim League (N)	Imran Ilyas Chaudhry	
Rawalpindi	PP-12 Rawalpindi-VI	Pakistan Muslim League (N)	Mohsin Ayub Khan	
Rawalpindi	PP-13 Rawalpindi-VII	Sunni Ittehad Council	Malik Fahad Masood	
Rawalpindi	PP-14 Rawalpindi-VIII	Pakistan Muslim League (N)	Malik Iftikhar Ahmed	
Rawalpindi	PP-15 Rawalpindi-IX	Pakistan Muslim League (N)	Malik Mansoor Afsar	
Rawalpindi	PP-16 Rawalpindi-X	Pakistan Muslim League (N)	Zia Ullah Shah	
Rawalpindi	PP-17 Rawalpindi-XI	Pakistan Muslim League (N)	Raja Abdul Hanif	
Rawalpindi	PP-18 Rawalpindi-XII	Majlis Wahdat-e-Muslimeen	Asad Abbas	
Rawalpindi	PP-19 Rawalpindi-XIII	Sunni Ittehad Council	Muhammad Tanveer Aslam	
Chakwal	PP-20 Chakwal-I	Pakistan Muslim League (N)	Sultan Haider Ali Khan	
Chakwal	PP-21 Chakwal-II	Pakistan Muslim League (N)	Tanveer Aslam Malik	
Talagang	PP-22 Chakwal-cum-Talagang	Pakistan Muslim League (N)	Malik Falak Sher Awan	
Talagang	PP-23 Talagang	Pakistan Muslim League (N)	Shehryar Malik	
Jhelum	PP-24 Jhelum-I	Sunni Ittehad Council	Syed Riffat Mehmood	
Jhelum	PP-25 Jhelum-II	Sunni Ittehad Council	Yasir Mehmood Qureshi	
Jhelum	PP-26 Jhelum-III	Sunni Ittehad Council	Mushtaq Ahmed	
Gujrat	PP-27 Gujrat-I	Pakistan Muslim League (Q)	Raja Muhammad Aslam Khan	
Gujrat	PP-28 Gujrat-II	Sunni Ittehad Council	Shahid Raza	
Gujrat	PP-29 Gujrat-III	Pakistan Muslim League (Q)	Khalid Javed Asghar Ghural	
Gujrat	PP-30 Gujrat-IV	Sunni Ittehad Council	Muhammad Abdullah Warraich	
Gujrat	PP-31 Gujrat-V	Pakistan Muslim League (Q)	Shafay Hussain	
Gujrat	PP-32 Gujrat-VI	Pakistan Muslim League (Q)	Chaudhry Musa Elahi	
Gujrat	PP-33 Gujrat-VII	Pakistan Muslim League (Q)	Syed Madad Ali Shah	
Gujrat	PP-34 Gujrat-VIII	Pakistan Muslim League (Q)	Chaudhry ljaz Ahmad	
Wazirabad	PP-35 Wazirabad-I	Pakistan Muslim League (N)	Waqar Ahmad Cheema	
Wazirabad	PP-36 Wazirabad-II	Pakistan Muslim League (N)	Adnan Afzal Chattha	
Hafizabad	PP-37 Hafizabad-I	Pakistan Muslim League (N)	Shahid Hussain Bhatti	
Hafizabad	PP-38 Hafizabad-II	Sunni Ittehad Council	Zameer Ul Hassan Bhatti	
Hafizabad	PP-39 Hafizabad-III	Pakistan Muslim League (N)	Muhammad Aoun Jahangir	
Mandi Bahauddin	PP-40 Mandi Bahauddin-I	Sunni Ittehad Council	Zarnab Sher	
Mandi Bahauddin	PP-41 Mandi Bahauddin-II	Sunni Ittehad Council	Basma Riaz Choudhry	
Mandi Bahauddin	PP-42 Mandi Bahauddin-III	Pakistan Muslim League (N)	Khalid Mahmood Ranjha	
Mandi Bahauddin	PP-43 Mandi Bahauddin-IV	Pakistan Muslim League (N)	Chaudhry Akhtar Abbas Bosal	
Sialkot	PP-44 Sialkot-I	Pakistan Muslim League (N)	Rana Muhammad Arif Iqbal Harnah	
Sialkot	PP-45 Sialkot-II	Pakistan Muslim League (N)	Tariq Subhani	
Sialkot	PP-46 Sialkot-III	Pakistan Muslim League (N)	Faisal Akram	
Sialkot	PP-47 Sialkot-IV	Pakistan Muslim League (N)	Muhammad Mansha Ullah Butt	
Sialkot	PP-48 Sialkot-V	Pakistan Muslim League (N)	Khurram Khan Virk	
Sialkot	PP-49 Sialkot-VI	Pakistan Muslim League (N)	Muhammad Fiaz	
Sialkot	PP-50 Sialkot-VII	Pakistan Muslim League (N)	Chaudhry Naveed Ashraf	
Sialkot	PP-51 Sialkot-VIII	Pakistan Muslim League (N)	Zeeshan Rafiq	
Sialkot	PP-52 Sialkot-IX	Pakistan Muslim League (N)	Hina Arshad Warraich	
Sialkot	PP-53 Sialkot-X	Pakistan Muslim League (N)	Rana Abdul Sattar	
Narowal	PP-54 Narowal-I	Pakistan Muslim League (N)	Ahmad Iqbal Chaudhary	
Narowal	PP-55 Narowal-II	Sunni Ittehad Council	Chaudhry Mehmood Ahmad Sungran	
Narowal	PP-56 Narowal-III	Pakistan Muslim League (N)	Rana Mannan Khan	
Narowal	PP-57 Narowal-IV	Pakistan Muslim League (N)	Khawaja Muhammad Waseem	
Narowal	PP-58 Narowal-V	Pakistan Muslim League (N)	Bilal Akbar Khan	
Gujranwala	PP-59 Gujranwala-I	Sunni Ittehad Council	Muhammad Nasir Cheema	
Gujranwala	PP-60 Gujranwala-II	Sunni Ittehad Council	Kaleem Ullah Khan	
Gujranwala	PP-61 Gujranwala-III	Pakistan Muslim League (N)	Imran Khalid Butt	
Gujranwala	PP-62 Gujranwala-IV	Pakistan Muslim League (N)	Muhammad Nawaz Chohan	
Gujranwala	PP-63 Gujranwala-V	Sunni Ittehad Council	Chaudhry Muhammad Tariq	
Gujranwala	PP-64 Gujranwala-VI	Pakistan Muslim League (N)	Umar Farooq Dar	
Gujranwala	PP-65 Gujranwala-VII	Sunni Ittehad Council	Hassan Ali	
Gujranwala	PP-66 Gujranwala-VIII	Pakistan Muslim League (N)	Qaiser Iqbal Sindhu	
Gujranwala	PP-67 Gujranwala-IX	Pakistan Muslim League (N)	Chaudhry Akhtar Ali Khan	
Gujranwala	PP-68 Gujranwala-X	Sunni Ittehad Council	Mian Arqam Khan	
Gujranwala	PP-69 Gujranwala-XI	Pakistan Muslim League (N)	Irfan Bashir	
Gujranwala	PP-70 Gujranwala-XII	Sunni Ittehad Council	Tashakul Abbas Warraich	
Sargodha	PP-71 Sargodha-I	Pakistan Muslim League (N)	Sohaib Ahmad Malik	
Sargodha	PP-72 Sargodha-II	Pakistan Muslim League (N)	Mansoor Azam	
Sargodha	PP-73 Sargodha-III	Pakistan Muslim League (N)	Mian Sultan Ali Ranjha	
Sargodha	PP-74 Sargodha-IV	Pakistan Muslim League (N)	Ikram Ul Haq	
Sargodha	PP-75 Sargodha-V	Sunni Ittehad Council	Ali Asif	
Sargodha	PP-76 Sargodha-VI	Sunni Ittehad Council	Zulfiqar Ali Bhatti	
Sargodha	PP-77 Sargodha-VII	Pakistan Muslim League (N)	Safdar Hussain Sahi	
Sargodha	PP-78 Sargodha-VIII	Pakistan Muslim League (N)	Rana Munawar Hussain	
Sargodha	PP-79 Sargodha-IX	Pakistan Muslim League (N)	Taimur Ali Khan	
Sargodha	PP-80 Sargodha-X	Pakistan Muslim League (N)	Sardar Muhammad Asim Sher Maken	
Khushab	PP-81 Khushab-I	Sunni Ittehad Council	Hasan Aslam Awan	
Khushab	PP-82 Khushab-II	Pakistan Muslim League (N)	Muhammad Asif Malik	
Khushab	PP-83 Khushab-III	Pakistan Muslim League (N)	Zafar Khan Baloch	
Khushab	PP-84 Khushab-IV	Sunni Ittehad Council	Fateh Khaliq	
Mianwali	PP-85 Mianwali-I	Sunni Ittehad Council	Muhammad Iqbal	
Mianwali	PP-86 Mianwali-II	Sunni Ittehad Council	Amin Ullah Khan	
Mianwali	PP-87 Mianwali-III	Pakistan Muslim League (N)	Ali Haider Noor Khan Niazi	
Mianwali	PP-88 Mianwali-IV	Sunni Ittehad Council	Mumtaz Ahmad	
Bhakkar	PP-89 Bhakkar-I	Pakistan People's Party	Ameer Muhammad Khan	
Bhakkar	PP-90 Bhakkar-II	Pakistan Muslim League (N)	Ahmad Nawaz Khan	
Bhakkar	PP-91 Bhakkar-III	Istehkam-e-Pakistan Party	Ghazanfar Abbas Cheena	
Bhakkar	PP-92 Bhakkar-IV	Pakistan Muslim League (N)	Amir Inayat Khan Shahani	
Bhakkar	PP-93 Bhakkar-V	Pakistan Muslim League (N)	Saeed Akbar Khan Nawani	
Chiniot	PP-94 Chiniot-I	Pakistan Muslim League (N)	Taimoor Ali Lali	
Chiniot	PP-95 Chiniot-II	Pakistan Muslim League (N)	Ilyas Chinioti	
Chiniot	PP-96 Chiniot-III	Pakistan Muslim League (N)	Zulfiqar Ali Shah	
Chiniot	PP-97 Chiniot-IV	Pakistan Muslim League (N)	Saqib Khan Chadhar	
Faisalabad	PP-98 Faisalabad-I	Pakistan Muslim League (N)	Azad Ali Tabassum	
Faisalabad	PP-99 Faisalabad-II	Sunni Ittehad Council	Ahmad Mujtaba Chaudhry	
Faisalabad	PP-100 Faisalabad-III	Pakistan Muslim League (N)	Sardar Khan Bahadur Dogar	
Faisalabad	PP-101 Faisalabad-IV	Sunni Ittehad Council	Muhammad Akram Chaudhary	
Faisalabad	PP-102 Faisalabad-V	Pakistan Muslim League (N)	Jafar Ali Hocha	
Faisalabad	PP-103 Faisalabad-VI	Sunni Ittehad Council	Noor Shahid Noor	
Faisalabad	PP-104 Faisalabad-VII	Pakistan Muslim League (N)	Arif Mahmood Gill	
Faisalabad	PP-105 Faisalabad-VIII	Pakistan Muslim League (N)	Rao Kashif Raheem Khan	
Faisalabad	PP-106 Faisalabad-IX	Sunni Ittehad Council	Ahsan Raza	
Faisalabad	PP-107 Faisalabad-X	Sunni Ittehad Council	Javed Niaz Manj	
Faisalabad	PP-108 Faisalabad-XI	Sunni Ittehad Council	Rana Aftab Ahmad Khan	
Faisalabad	PP-109 Faisalabad-XII	Pakistan Muslim League (N)	Chaudhry Zafar Iqbal Nagra	
Faisalabad	PP-110 Faisalabad-XIII	Sunni Ittehad Council	Hassan Zaka	
Faisalabad	PP-111 Faisalabad-XIV	Sunni Ittehad Council	Basharat Ali	
Faisalabad	PP-112 Faisalabad-XV	Sunni Ittehad Council	Asad Mehmood	
Faisalabad	PP-113 Faisalabad-XVI	Sunni Ittehad Council	Nadeem Sadiq Dogar	
Faisalabad	PP-114 Faisalabad-XVII	Sunni Ittehad Council	Chaudhry Latif Nazar Gujjar	
Faisalabad	PP-115 Faisalabad-XVIII	Pakistan Muslim League (N)	Mian Tahir Pervaz	
Faisalabad	PP-116 Faisalabad-XIX	Pakistan Muslim League (N)	Rana Ahmad Sheheryar Khan	
Faisalabad	PP-117 Faisalabad-XX	Sunni Ittehad Council	Abdul Razzaq Khan	
Faisalabad	PP-118 Faisalabad-XXI	Sunni Ittehad Council	Khayal Ahmad Kastro	
Toba Tek Singh	PP-119 Toba Tek Singh-I	Sunni Ittehad Council	Asad Zaman	
Toba Tek Singh	PP-120 Toba Tek Singh-II	Sunni Ittehad Council	Muhammad Ahsan Ihsan	
Toba Tek Singh	PP-121 Toba Tek Singh-III	Pakistan Muslim League (N)	Chaudhry Amjad Ali Javed	
Toba Tek Singh	PP-122 Toba Tek Singh-IV	Pakistan Muslim League (N)	Sardar Muhammad Ayub Khan	
Toba Tek Singh	PP-123 Toba Tek Singh-V	Sunni Ittehad Council	Ashifa Riaz Fatyana	
Toba Tek Singh	PP-124 Toba Tek Singh-VI	Sunni Ittehad Council	Syeda Sonia Ali Raza Shah	
Jhang	PP-125 Jhang-I	Sunni Ittehad Council	Ghulam Ahmed Khan Gadi	
Jhang	PP-126 Jhang-II	Sunni Ittehad Council	Mehar Muhammad Nawaz	
Jhang	PP-127 Jhang-III	Sunni Ittehad Council	Sheikh Muhammad Akram	
Jhang	PP-128 Jhang-IV	Istehkam-e-Pakistan Party	Ghazanfar Abbas Shah	
Jhang	PP-129 Jhang-V	Sunni Ittehad Council	Mian Muhammad Asif Kathia	
Jhang	PP-130 Jhang-VI	Sunni Ittehad Council	Rana Shahbaz Ahmad	
Jhang	PP-131 Jhang-VII	Sunni Ittehad Council	Mian Muhammad Azam	
Nankana Sahib	PP-132 Nankana Sahib-I	Pakistan Muslim League (N)	Sultan Bajwa	
Nankana Sahib	PP-133 Nankana Sahib-II	Pakistan Muslim League (N)	Rana Muhammad Arshad	
Nankana Sahib	PP-134 Nankana Sahib-III	Pakistan Muslim League (N)	Mahr Muhammad Kashif	
Nankana Sahib	PP-135 Nankana Sahib-IV	Pakistan Muslim League (N)	Agha Ali Haidar	
Sheikhpura	PP-136 Sheikhupura-I	Pakistan Muslim League (N)	Hassaan Riaz	
Sheikhpura	PP-137 Sheikhupura-II	Sunni Ittehad Council	Khurram Ijaz Chattha	
Sheikhpura	PP-138 Sheikhupura-III	Pakistan Muslim League (N)	Pir Muhammad Ashraf Rasool	
Sheikhpura	PP-139 Sheikhupura-IV	Pakistan Muslim League (N)	Rana Tahir Iqbal	
Sheikhpura	PP-140 Sheikhupura-V	Sunni Ittehad Council	Muhammad Awais	
Sheikhpura	PP-141 Sheikhupura-VI	Sunni Ittehad Council	Tayyab Rashid	
Sheikhpura	PP-142 Sheikhupura-VII	Sunni Ittehad Council	Waqas Mahmood Maan	
Sheikhpura	PP-143 Sheikhupura-VIII	Sunni Ittehad Council	Khan Sher Akbar Khan	
Sheikhpura	PP-144 Sheikhupura-IX	Sunni Ittehad Council	Muhammad Sarfraz Dogar	
Lahore	PP-145 Lahore-I	Pakistan Muslim League (N)	Sami Ullah Khan	
Lahore	PP-146 Lahore-II	Pakistan Muslim League (N)	Ghazali Saleem Butt	
Lahore	PP-147 Lahore-III	Pakistan Muslim League (N)	Muhammad Riaz Malik	
Lahore	PP-148 Lahore-IV	Pakistan Muslim League (N)	Mian Mujtaba Shuja-ur-Rehman	
Lahore	PP-149 Lahore-V	Istehkam-e-Pakistan Party	Muhammad Shoaib Siddiqui	
Lahore	PP-150 Lahore-VI	Pakistan Muslim League (N)	Khawaja Imran Nazir	
Lahore	PP-151 Lahore-VII	Pakistan Muslim League (N)	Sohail Shaukat Butt	
Lahore	PP-152 Lahore-VIII	Pakistan Muslim League (N)	Malik Muhammad Waheed	
Lahore	PP-153 Lahore-IX	Pakistan Muslim League (N)	Khawaja Salman Rafique	
Lahore	PP-154 Lahore-X	Pakistan Muslim League (N)	Malik Ghulam Habib Awan	
Lahore	PP-155 Lahore-XI	Sunni Ittehad Council	Imtiaz Mehmood	
Lahore	PP-156 Lahore-XII	Sunni Ittehad Council	Ali Imtiaz	
Lahore	PP-157 Lahore-XIII	Sunni Ittehad Council	Hafiz Farhat Abbas	
Lahore	PP-158 Lahore-XIV	Pakistan Muslim League (N)	Chaudhary Muhammad Nawaz Ladhar	
Lahore	PP-159 Lahore-XV	Pakistan Muslim League (N)	Maryam Nawaz	
Lahore	PP-160 Lahore-XVI	Pakistan Muslim League (Z)	Malik Asad Ali Khokhar	
Lahore	PP-161 Lahore-XVII	Sunni Ittehad Council	Farrukh Javaid	
Lahore	PP-162 Lahore-XVIII	Pakistan Muslim League (N)	Shahbaz Ali Khokhar	
Lahore	PP-163 Lahore-XIX	Pakistan Muslim League (N)	Imran Javed	
Lahore	PP-164 Lahore-XX	Pakistan Muslim League (N)	Rana Rashid Minhas	
Lahore	PP-165 Lahore-XXI	Sunni Ittehad Council	Ahmer Rasheed Bhatti	
Lahore	PP-166 Lahore-XXII	Pakistan Muslim League (N)	Muhammad Anas Mehmood	
Lahore	PP-167 Lahore-XXIII	Pakistan Muslim League (N)	Irfan Shafi Khokhar	
Lahore	PP-168 Lahore-XXIV	Pakistan Muslim League (N)	Faisal Ayub Khokhar	
Lahore	PP-169 Lahore-XXV	Pakistan Muslim League (N)	Malik Khalid Pervaz Khokhar	
Lahore	PP-170 Lahore-XXVI	Sunni Ittehad Council	Mian Muhammad Haroon Akbar	
Lahore	PP-171 Lahore-XXVII	Sunni Ittehad Council	Mian Aslam Iqbal	
Lahore	PP-172 Lahore-XXVIII	Sunni Ittehad Council	Misbah Wajid	
Lahore	PP-173 Lahore-XXIX	Pakistan Muslim League (N)	Mian Marghoob Ahmad	
Lahore	PP-174 Lahore-XXX	Pakistan Muslim League (N)	Bilal Yasin	
Kasur	PP-175 Kasur-I	Sunni Ittehad Council	Rashid Tufail	
Kasur	PP-176 Kasur-II	Pakistan Muslim League (N)	Muhammad Ilyas Khan	
Kasur	PP-177 Kasur-III	Pakistan Muslim League (N)	Muhammad Naeem Safdar Ansari	
Kasur	PP-178 Kasur-IV	Pakistan Muslim League (N)	Malik Ahmad Saeed Khan	
Kasur	PP-179 Kasur-V	Pakistan Muslim League (N)	Malik Ahmad Khan	
Kasur	PP-180 Kasur-VI	Pakistan Muslim League (N)	Ahsan Raza Khan	
Kasur	PP-181 Kasur-VII	Sunni Ittehad Council	Mian Humble Sana Kareemi	
Kasur	PP-182 Kasur-VIII	Pakistan Muslim League (N)	Mehmood Anwar	
Kasur	PP-183 Kasur-IX	Pakistan Muslim League (N)	Rana Sikandar Hayat	
Kasur	PP-184 Kasur-X	Pakistan Muslim League (N)	Rana Muhammad Iqbal Khan	
Okara	PP-185 Okara-I	Pakistan Muslim League (N)	Javaid Alla-ud-Din Sajid	
Okara	PP-186 Okara-II	Pakistan Muslim League (N)	Ashiq Husain Khan	
Okara	PP-187 Okara-III	Pakistan Muslim League (N)	Chaudry Iftikhar Hussain Chachar	
Okara	PP-188 Okara-IV	Pakistan Muslim League (N)	Noor Ul Amin Wattoo	
Okara	PP-189 Okara-V	Pakistan Muslim League (N)	Malik Ali Abbas Khokhar	
Okara	PP-190 Okara-VI	Pakistan Muslim League (N)	Mian Yawar Zaman	
Okara	PP-191 Okara-VII	Pakistan Muslim League (N)	Mian Muhammad Munir	
Okara	PP-192 Okara-VIII	Pakistan Muslim League (N)	Ghulam Raza	
Pakpattan	PP-193 Pakpattan-I	Pakistan Muslim League (N)	Farooq Ahmad Khan Maneka	
Pakpattan	PP-194 Pakpattan-II	Pakistan Muslim League (N)	Chaudhry Javed Ahmad	
Pakpattan	PP-195 Pakpattan-III	Pakistan Muslim League (N)	Imran Akram	
Pakpattan	PP-196 Pakpattan-IV	Pakistan Muslim League (N)	Farrukh Javed	
Pakpattan	PP-197 Pakpattan-V	Pakistan Muslim League (N)	Sardar Mansab Ali Dogar	
Sahiwal	PP-198 Sahiwal-I	Pakistan Muslim League (N)	Walayat Shah Khagga	
Sahiwal	PP-199 Sahiwal-II	Pakistan Muslim League (N)	Qasim Nadeem	
Sahiwal	PP-200 Sahiwal-III	Pakistan Muslim League (N)	Muhammad Arshad Malik	
Sahiwal	PP-201 Sahiwal-IV	Pakistan Muslim League (N)	Naveed Aslam Khan Lodhi	
Sahiwal	PP-202 Sahiwal-V	Pakistan Muslim League (N)	Rana Riaz Ahmad	
Sahiwal	PP-203 Sahiwal-VI	Pakistan Muslim League (N)	Chaudhry Muhammad Hanif	
Sahiwal	PP-204 Sahiwal-VII	Sunni Ittehad Council	Muhammad Ghulam Sarwar	
Khanewal	PP-205 Khanewal-I	Pakistan Muslim League (N)	Muhammad Akbar Hayat Hiraj	
Khanewal	PP-206 Khanewal-II	Pakistan Muslim League (N)	Chaudhary Usama Fazal	
Khanewal	PP-207 Khanewal-III	Pakistan Muslim League (N)	Amir Hayat Hiraj	
Khanewal	PP-208 Khanewal-IV	Pakistan Muslim League (N)	Rana Babar Hussain Abid	
Khanewal	PP-209 Khanewal-V	Pakistan Muslim League (N)	Chaudhry Zia Ur Rehman	
Khanewal	PP-210 Khanewal-VI	Sunni Ittehad Council	Khalid Javed	
Khanewal	PP-211 Khanewal-VII	Pakistan Muslim League (N)	Rana Muhammad Saleem	
Khanewal	PP-212 Khanewal-VIII	Pakistan Muslim League (N)	Asghar Hayat	
Multan	PP-213 Multan-I	Pakistan People's Party	Ali Haider Gillani	
Multan	PP-214 Multan-II	Sunni Ittehad Council	Nawabzada Waseem Khan Badozai	
Multan	PP-215 Multan-III	Sunni Ittehad Council	Muhammad Moeen Ud Din Riaz	
Multan	PP-216 Multan-IV	Sunni Ittehad Council	Muhammad Adnan Dogar	
Multan	PP-217 Multan-V	Sunni Ittehad Council	Muhammad Nadeem Qureshi	
Multan	PP-218 Multan-VI	Pakistan Muslim League (N)	Muhammad Salman Naeem	
Multan	PP-219 Multan-VII	Istehkam-e-Pakistan Party	Malik Wasif Mazhar Raan	
Multan	PP-220 Multan-VIII	Pakistan People's Party	Muhammad Iqbal	
Multan	PP-221 Multan-IX	Pakistan People's Party	Mian Kamran Muhammad Abdullah	
Multan	PP-222 Multan-X	Sunni Ittehad Council	Ayaz Ahmed	
Multan	PP-223 Multan-XI	Pakistan Muslim League (N)	Muhammad Nazik Kareem	
Multan	PP-224 Multan-XII	Pakistan Muslim League (N)	Malik Lal Muhammad	
Lodhran	PP-225 Lodhran-I	Pakistan Muslim League (N)	Shazia Hayyat	
Lodhran	PP-226 Lodhran-II	Sunni Ittehad Council	Razi Ullah Khan	
Lodhran	PP-227 Lodhran-III	Pakistan Muslim League (N)	Muhammad Zubair Khan Baloch	
Lodhran	PP-228 Lodhran-IV	Sunni Ittehad Council	Izzat Javaid Khan	
Vehari	PP-229 Vehari-I	Pakistan Muslim League (N)	Chaudhry Muhammad Yousaf Kaselya	
Vehari	PP-230 Vehari-II	Sunni Ittehad Council	Salman Shahid	
Vehari	PP-231 Vehari-III	Sunni Ittehad Council	Khalid Zubair Nisar	
Vehari	PP-232 Vehari-IV	Pakistan Muslim League (N)	Malik Nosher Khan Anjam Lungerial	
Vehari	PP-233 Vehari-V	Pakistan Muslim League (N)	Mian Muhammad Saqib Khurshid	
Vehari	PP-234 Vehari-VI	Pakistan Muslim League (N)	Muhammad Naeem Akhtar Khan Bhabha	
Vehari	PP-235 Vehari-VII	Sunni Ittehad Council	Muhammad Jahanzaib Khan Khichi	
Vehari	PP-236 Vehari-VIII	Sunni Ittehad Council	Muhammad Ali Raza Khan Khakwani	
Bahawalnagar	PP-237 Bahawalnagar-I	Pakistan Muslim League (N)	Mian Fida Hussain Wattoo	
Bahawalnagar	PP-238 Bahawalnagar-II	Pakistan People's Party	Inam Bari	
Bahawalnagar	PP-239 Bahawalnagar-III	Sunni Ittehad Council	Muhammad Atif Aurangzeb	
Bahawalnagar	PP-240 Bahawalnagar-IV	Pakistan Muslim League (N)	Muhammad Sohail Khan Zahid	
Bahawalnagar	PP-241 Bahawalnagar-V	Pakistan Muslim League (Z)	Chaudhry Ghulam Murtaza	
Bahawalnagar	PP-242 Bahawalnagar-VI	Pakistan Muslim League (N)	Kashif Naveed	
Bahawalnagar	PP-243 Bahawalnagar-VII	Pakistan Muslim League (N)	Chaudhry Zahid Akram	
Bahawalnagar	PP-244 Bahawalnagar-VIII	Sunni Ittehad Council	Suryia Sultana	
Bahawalpur	PP-245 Bahawalpur-I	Pakistan Muslim League (N)	Kazim Ali Pirzada	
Bahawalpur	PP-246 Bahawalpur-II	Sunni Ittehad Council	Farzana Khalil	
Bahawalpur	PP-247 Bahawalpur-III	Pakistan Muslim League (N)	Chaudhry Khalid Mehmood Jajja	
Bahawalpur	PP-248 Bahawalpur-IV	Pakistan Muslim League (Q)	Hassan Askari Sheikh	
Bahawalpur	PP-249 Bahawalpur-V	Istehkam-e-Pakistan Party	Sahibzada Gazain Abbasi	
Bahawalpur	PP-250 Bahawalpur-VI	Pakistan People's Party	Syed Amir Ali Shah	
Bahawalpur	PP-251 Bahawalpur-VII	Pakistan Muslim League (N)	Malik Khalid Mehmood Babar	
Bahawalpur	PP-252 Bahawalpur-VIII	Pakistan Muslim League (N)	Mian Muhammad Shoaib Awaisi	
Bahawalpur	PP-253 Bahawalpur-IX	Pakistan Muslim League (N)	Zaheer Iqbal Channar	
Bahawalpur	PP-254 Bahawalpur-X	Pakistan Muslim League (N)	Rana Muhammad Tariq Khan	
Rahim Yar Khan	PP-255 Rahim Yar Khan-I	Pakistan People's Party	Ghazanfar Ali Khan	
Rahim Yar Khan	PP-256 Rahim Yar Khan-II	Pakistan People's Party	Qazi Ahmad Saeed	
Rahim Yar Khan	PP-257 Rahim Yar Khan-III	Pakistan Muslim League (N)	Chaudhry Mahmood Ahmed	
Rahim Yar Khan	PP-258 Rahim Yar Khan-IV	Sunni Ittehad Council	Muhammad Ejaz Shafi	
Rahim Yar Khan	PP-259 Rahim Yar Khan-V	Istehkam-e-Pakistan Party	Faisal Jamil	
Rahim Yar Khan	PP-260 Rahim Yar Khan-VI	Sunni Ittehad Council	Saima Kanwal	
Rahim Yar Khan	PP-261 Rahim Yar Khan-VII	Sunni Ittehad Council	Jam Aman Ullah	
Rahim Yar Khan	PP-262 Rahim Yar Khan-VIII	Sunni Ittehad Council	Chaudhry Asif Majeed	
Rahim Yar Khan	PP-263 Rahim Yar Khan-IX	Sunni Ittehad Council	Chaudhary Naeem Shafiq	
Rahim Yar Khan	PP-264 Rahim Yar Khan-X	Pakistan People's Party	Sardar Habib Ur Rehman Khan	
Rahim Yar Khan	PP-265 Rahim Yar Khan-XI	Sunni Ittehad Council	Sajjad Ahmad	
Rahim Yar Khan	PP-266 Rahim Yar Khan-XII	Pakistan People's Party	Mumtaz Ali Khan Chang	
Rahim Yar Khan	PP-267 Rahim Yar Khan-XIII	Pakistan People's Party	Rais Nabeel Ahmad	
Muzaffargarh	PP-268 Muzaffargarh-I	Pakistan Muslim League (N)	Muhammad Ajmal Khan Chandia	
Muzaffargarh	PP-269 Muzaffargarh-II	Pakistan People's Party	Mian Alamdar Abbas Qureshi	
Muzaffargarh	PP-270 Muzaffargarh-III	Istehkam-e-Pakistan Party	Zahid Ismail Bhutta	
Muzaffargarh	PP-271 Muzaffargarh-IV	Istehkam-e-Pakistan Party	Muhammad Aoon Hamid	
Muzaffargarh	PP-272 Muzaffargarh-V	Pakistan Muslim League (N)	Rana Abdul Manan Sajid	
Muzaffargarh	PP-273 Muzaffargarh-VI	Sunni Ittehad Council	Daud Khan Jatoi	
Muzaffargarh	PP-274 Muzaffargarh-VII	Istehkam-e-Pakistan Party	Syed Muhammad Sibtain Raza	
Muzaffargarh	PP-275 Muzaffargarh-VIII	Pakistan Muslim League (N)	Nawab Khan Gopang	
Kot Addu	PP-276 Kot Addu-I	Sunni Ittehad Council	Rana Aurangzaib	
Kot Addu	PP-277 Kot Addu-II	Sunni Ittehad Council	Nadia Khar	
Kot Addu	PP-278 Kot Addu-III	Sunni Ittehad Council	Muhammad Ahsan Ali	
Layyah	PP-279 Layyah-I	Sunni Ittehad Council	Muhammad Athar Maqbool	
Layyah	PP-280 Layyah-II	Sunni Ittehad Council	Sardar Shahab-ud-Din Khan	
Layyah	PP-281 Layyah-III	Sunni Ittehad Council	Shoaib Ameer	
Layyah	PP-282 Layyah-IV	Sunni Ittehad Council	Usama Asghar Ali Gujjar	
Layyah	PP-283 Layyah-V	Pakistan Muslim League (N)	Ghulam Asghar Khan	
Tonsa	PP-284 Tonsa-I	Istehkam-e-Pakistan Party	Muhammad Tahir	
Tonsa	PP-285 Tonsa-II	Sunni Ittehad Council	Khawaja Salah Ud Din Akbar	
Dera Ghazi Khan	PP-286 Dera Ghazi Khan-I	Pakistan Muslim League (N)	Salah Ud Din Khan	
Dera Ghazi Khan	PP-287 Dera Ghazi Khan-II	Pakistan Muslim League (N)	Usama Leghari	
Dera Ghazi Khan	PP-288 Dera Ghazi Khan-III	Pakistan People’s Party	Hanif Khan Pitafi	
Dera Ghazi Khan	PP-289 Dera Ghazi Khan-IV	Pakistan Muslim League (N)	Muhammad Taufeeq Butt	
Dera Ghazi Khan	PP-290 Dera Ghazi Khan-V	Pakistan Muslim League (N)	Sardar Ali Ahmed Khan Leghari	
Dera Ghazi Khan	PP-291 Dera Ghazi Khan-VI	Pakistan Muslim League (N)	Muhammad Ahmad Khan Leghari	
Rajanpur	PP-292 Rajanpur-I	Pakistan Muslim League (N)	Sardar Sher Afgan Gorchani	
Rajanpur	PP-293 Rajanpur-II	Pakistan Muslim League (N)	Sardar Sher Ali Gorchani	
Rajanpur	PP-294 Rajanpur-III	Pakistan Muslim League (N)	Sardar Pervaz Iqbal Gorchani	
Rajanpur	PP-295 Rajanpur-IV	Pakistan Muslim League (N)	Abdul Aziz Khan Dreshak	
Rajanpur	PP-296 Rajanpur-V	Istehkam-e-Pakistan Party	Awais Dareshak	
Rajanpur	PP-297 Rajanpur-VI	Pakistan Muslim League (N)	Khizer Hussain Mazari	
Reserved Seats	W-298	Pakistan Muslim League (N)	Zakia Shahnawaz Khan	
Reserved Seats	W-299	Pakistan Muslim League (N)	Begum Ishrat Ashraf	
Reserved Seats	W-300	Pakistan Muslim League (N)	Marriyum Aurangzeb	
Reserved Seats	W-301	Pakistan Muslim League (N)	Azma Bukhari	
Reserved Seats	W-302	Pakistan Muslim League (N)	Hina Pervaiz Butt	
Reserved Seats	W-303	Pakistan Muslim League (N)	Salma Saadia Taimoor	
Reserved Seats	W-304	Pakistan Muslim League (N)	Raheela Naeem	
Reserved Seats	W-305	Pakistan Muslim League (Q)	Faiza Mushtaq	
Reserved Seats	W-306	Pakistan Muslim League (N)	Sania Ashiq	
Reserved Seats	W-307	Pakistan Muslim League (N)	Salma Shaheen Butt	
Reserved Seats	W-308	Pakistan Muslim League (N)	Kanwal Pervaiz	
Reserved Seats	W-309	Pakistan Muslim League (N)	Mehwish Sultana	
Reserved Seats	W-310	Pakistan Muslim League (N)	Nausheen Adnan	
Reserved Seats	W-311	Pakistan Muslim League (N)	Asma Ehtisham ul Haq	
Reserved Seats	W-312	Pakistan Muslim League (N)	Kausar Javed	
Reserved Seats	W-313	Pakistan Muslim League (N)	Uzma Jabeen	
Reserved Seats	W-314	Pakistan Muslim League (N)	Ambreen Ismail	
Reserved Seats	W-315	Pakistan Muslim League (N)	Mumtaz Begum	
Reserved Seats	W-316	Pakistan Muslim League (N)	Sumbal Malik Hussain	
Reserved Seats	W-317	Pakistan Muslim League (N)	Rukhsana Kausar	
Reserved Seats	W-318	Pakistan Muslim League (N)	Shazia Rizwan	
Reserved Seats	W-319	Pakistan Muslim League (N)	Motiya Begum	
Reserved Seats	W-320	Pakistan Muslim League (N)	Rabia Naseem Farooqi	
Reserved Seats	W-321	Pakistan Muslim League (N)	Sonia Ashir	
Reserved Seats	W-322	Pakistan Muslim League (N)	Uzma Kardar	
Reserved Seats	W-323	Pakistan Muslim League (N)	Safia Saeed	
Reserved Seats	W-324	Pakistan Muslim League (N)	Tahia Noon	
Reserved Seats	W-325	Pakistan Muslim League (N)	Amina Hassan	
Reserved Seats	W-326	Pakistan Muslim League (N)	Asma Naz	
Reserved Seats	W-327	Pakistan Muslim League (N)	Tahira Mushtaq	
Reserved Seats	W-328	Pakistan Muslim League (N)	Zaib un Nisa Awan	
Reserved Seats	W-329	Pakistan Muslim League (N)	Fatima Begum	
Reserved Seats	W-330	Pakistan Muslim League (N)	Qudsia Batool	
Reserved Seats	W-331	Pakistan Muslim League (N)	Riffat Abbasi	
Reserved Seats	W-332	Pakistan Muslim League (N)	Atiya Iftikhar	
Reserved Seats	W-333	Pakistan Muslim League (N)	Rushda Lodhi	
Reserved Seats	W-334	Pakistan People's Party	Shazia Abid	
Reserved Seats	W-335	Pakistan People's Party	Neelam Jabbar Chaudhary	
Reserved Seats	W-336	Pakistan People's Party	Nargis Faiz Malik	
Reserved Seats	W-337	Sunni Ittehad Council	Tashfeen Safdar	
Reserved Seats	W-338	Pakistan Muslim League (Q)	Salma Saeed	
Reserved Seats	W-339	Istehkam-e-Pakistan Party	Sarah Ahmad	
Reserved Seats	W-340	Seat suspended due to Reserved seats case		
Reserved Seats	W-341	Seat suspended due to Reserved seats case		
Reserved Seats	W-342	Seat suspended due to Reserved seats case		
Reserved Seats	W-343	Seat suspended due to Reserved seats case		
Reserved Seats	W-344	Seat suspended due to Reserved seats case		
Reserved Seats	W-345	Seat suspended due to Reserved seats case		
Reserved Seats	W-346	Seat suspended due to Reserved seats case		
Reserved Seats	W-347	Seat suspended due to Reserved seats case		
Reserved Seats	W-348	Seat suspended due to Reserved seats case		
Reserved Seats	W-349	Seat suspended due to Reserved seats case		
Reserved Seats	W-350	Seat suspended due to Reserved seats case		
Reserved Seats	W-351	Seat suspended due to Reserved seats case		
Reserved Seats	W-352	Seat suspended due to Reserved seats case		
Reserved Seats	W-353	Seat suspended due to Reserved seats case		
Reserved Seats	W-354	Seat suspended due to Reserved seats case		
Reserved Seats	W-355	Seat suspended due to Reserved seats case		
Reserved Seats	W-356	Seat suspended due to Reserved seats case		
Reserved Seats	W-357	Seat suspended due to Reserved seats case		
Reserved Seats	W-358	Seat suspended due to Reserved seats case		
Reserved Seats	W-359	Seat suspended due to Reserved seats case		
Reserved Seats	W-360	Seat suspended due to Reserved seats case		
Reserved Seats	W-361	Seat suspended due to Reserved seats case		
Reserved Seats	For Minorities	Seat suspended due to Reserved seats case		
Reserved Seats	For Minorities	Seat suspended due to Reserved seats case		
Reserved Seats	For Minorities	Seat suspended due to Reserved seats case		
Reserved Seats	For Minorities	Pakistan Muslim League (N)	Baba Falbous Christopher	
Reserved Seats	For Minorities	Pakistan Muslim League (N)	Emmanuel Ather Julius	
Reserved Seats	For Minorities	Pakistan Muslim League (N)	Ramesh Singh Arora	
Reserved Seats	For Minorities	Sunni Ittehad Council	Mahindar Pall Singh	
Reserved Seats	For Minorities	Pakistan Muslim League (N)	Shakeela Javed Aurthur	
