= Kaleem Ullah Khan =

Kaleem Ullah Khan may refer to:

- Kaleem Ullah Khan (horticulturist)
- Kaleem Ullah Khan (politician)
