= Syed Qutab Ali Shah =

Pakistani politician

Member of the Provincial Assembly of the Punjab
- In office 15 August 2018 – 12 February 2019
- Constituency: PP-123 Toba Tek Singh-VI
- In office January 2016 – 31 May 2018
- Preceded by: Makhdoom Syed Ali Raza Shah

Personal details
- Party: PMLN
- Nickname: Ali Baba

Syed Qutab Ali Shah, also known as Ali Baba, is a Pakistani politician who was a Member of the Provincial Assembly of the Punjab, from January 2016 to May 2018 and from August 2018 till February 2019.

== Political career ==
He was elected to the Provincial Assembly of the Punjab as a candidate of Pakistan Muslim League (Nawaz) (PML-N) from Constituency PP-89 (Toba Tek Singh-VI) in by polls held in January 2016.

He was re-elected to Provincial Assembly of the Punjab as a candidate of PML-N from Constituency PP-123 (Toba Tek Singh-VI) in the 2018 Pakistani general election.

He was deserted on 12 February 2019 due to a recount in his constituency that resulted in him being defeated by Syeda Sonia Ali Raza, a candidate of the Pakistan Tehreek-e-Insaf.
