= Syed Rafaqat Ali Gillani =

Pakistani politician

Member of the Provincial Assembly of the Punjab
- In office 15 August 2018 – 14 January 2023
- Constituency: PP-284 Layyah-V

Personal details
- Born: 5 November 1980 (age 46) Layyah, Punjab, Pakistan
- Party: PPP (2025-present)
- Other political affiliations: IPP (2023-2025); PTI (2018-2023)

Syed Rafaqat Ali Gillani is a Pakistani politician who had been a member of the Provincial Assembly of the Punjab from August 2018 till January 2023.

== Early life and education ==
Rafaqat Ali was born on 5 November 1980 in Layyah, Punjab into a feudal family to Syed Saadat Ali Gillani, also a politician, and he obtained his Master's in Physical Education from the Government College University, Faisalabad in 2008 and later graduated in Law from the Bahauddin Zakariya University, Multan in 2016.

== Police career ==
He served as Sub-Inspector in the Punjab Rangers from 2007 to 2013.

== Political career ==
He was elected to the Provincial Assembly of the Punjab as an independent candidate from PP-284 (Layyah-V) in the 2018 Punjab provincial election.

On 28 July 2018, he joined the Pakistan Tehreek-e-Insaf (PTI).

On 11 September 2018, he was inducted into the provincial cabinet of Chief Minister Usman Buzdar and was appointed special assistant to the Chief Minister on Auqaf and Religious Affairs.

He ran for a seat in the Provincial Assembly from PP-283 Layyah-IV as a candidate of the IPP in the 2024 Punjab provincial election.
