= Syed Hussain Raza Shah =

Pakistani politician

Makhdoomzada Syed Hussain Raza Shah MPA

Member of the Provincial Assembly of the Punjab
- In office 2002–2007
- Constituency: PP-123 (Toba Tek Singh-VI)

Personal details
- Born: 18 February 1972 Pir Mahal, Toba Tek Singh District
- Died: 16 January 2025 (aged 52)
- Party: Pakistan Muslim League (Q)
- Relations: Syeda Sonia Ali Raza Shah (sister)
- Parent: Makhdoom Syed Ali Raza Shah (father)

Makhdoomzada Syed Hussain Raza Shah (18 February 1972 - 16 January 2025) was a Pakistani politician who had been member of the Provincial Assembly of the Punjab between 2002 and 2007.

== Political career ==
He was elected to the Provincial Assembly of the Punjab as a candidate of Pakistan Muslim League (Q) (PML-Q) from Constituency PP-123 (Toba Tek Singh-VI) in the 2002 Pakistani general election.
