= Ghulam Ahmed Khan Gadi =

Pakistani politician

Member of the Provincial Assembly of the Punjab
- Incumbent
- Assumed office 24 February 2024
- Succeeded by: Faisal Saleh Hayat
- Constituency: PP-125 (Jhang-I)
- In office 2002–2007
- In office 1997–1999
- In office 1993–1996

Personal details
- Born: 22 October 1949 (age 76) Jhang District, Punjab, Pakistan
- Party: PTI (2024-present)
- Other political affiliations: PML(Q) (1993-2002)
- Education: University of the Punjab

Sardar Ghulam Ahmed Khan Gadi (born 22 October 1949) is a Pakistani politician and a Member of the Provincial Assembly of the Punjab since 2024. He had been elected MPA three prior times; twice from 1993 to 1999 and the third time from 2002 to 2007.

== Early life ==
Gadi was born on 22 October 1949 in Jhang District. He attended University of the Punjab, Lahore and graduated in 1970.

== Political career ==
He was elected to the Provincial Assembly of the Punjab in 1993 Pakistani general election. In the 1997 Pakistani general election, he was re-elected and again as a candidate of Pakistan Muslim League (Q) from Constituency PP-124 (Jhang-I) in 2002.

He was re-elected as an independent candidate from Constituency PP-125 Jhang-I in the 2024 Pakistani general election. He received 55,734 votes and defeated former members Faisal Saleh Hayat, a candidate of Pakistan Muslim League (N), and Rai Taimoor Khan.
