= Muhammad Tahir (disambiguation) =

Muhammad Tahir is a Naqshbandi Sufi shaykh in Pakistan.

Muhammad Tahir may also refer to:

- Muhammad Tahir (footballer, born 1994), Indonesian footballer.
- Muhammad Sharif Tahir, Pakistani wrestler.
- Mohammad Tahir, Pakistani police officer
- Muhammad Tahir (Pakistani politician)
- Mohammad Tahir (politician), Indian politician
- Mohammed Tahir, Fijian politician
- Muhannad El Tahir (born 1984), Sudanese footballer
- Muhammed Taher Pasha, Egpytian doctor of political science

== See also ==
- Mohamed Khamis Taher (born 1959), Libyan runner
- Mohammad Taher, Iraqi weightlifter who competed in the Weightlifting at the 1984 Summer Olympics – Men's 90 kg event
