= Rana Shahbaz Ahmad =

Pakistani politician

Member of the Provincial Assembly of the Punjab
- Incumbent
- Assumed office 15 August 2018
- Constituency: PP-130 Jhang-VII

Personal details
- Party: PTI (2018-present)

Rana Shahbaz Ahmad is a Pakistani politician who served as a member of the Provincial Assembly of the Punjab since August 2018. He was also the provincial Parliamentary Secretary for Livestock and Dairy Production.

He was temporarily suspended as Member of Provincial Assembly, due to protest against Chief Minister Maryam Nawaz.

== Political career ==
He was elected to the Provincial Assembly of the Punjab as a candidate of Pakistan Tehreek-e-Insaf (PTI) from PP-130 (Jhang-VII) in the 2018 Punjab provincial election.

He ran for a seat in the Provincial Assembly from PP-129 Jhang-VI as a candidate of the PTI in the 2024 Punjab provincial election.
