= PP-287 Dera Ghazi Khan-II =

Constituency of the Punjabi Provincial Legislature, Pakistan

- Constituency for the Provincial Assembly of Punjab
- Region: Dera Ghazi Khan Tehsil (partly) including Shah Sadar Din, Ghaus Abad and Kot Mubarak towns and Yaroo village and Kot Chutta Tehsil (partly) of Dera Ghazi Khan District

Current constituency
- Member: vacant
- Created from: PP-243 Dera Ghazi Khan-IV (2002-2018); PP-288 Dera Ghazi Khan-IV (2018-2023)

PP-287 Dera Ghazi Khan-II (پی پی-287، ڈيره غازى خان-2) is a Constituency of Provincial Assembly of Punjab.

== General elections 2024 ==
Provincial election 2024: PP-287 Dera Ghazi Khan-II
Party	Candidate	Votes	%	±%
PML(N)	Usama Leghari	60,136	45.21	
Independent	Akhlaq Ahmed (Note: Filed nomination papers as PTI candidate but ECP allowed him to run as an Independent)	59,107	44.44	
TLP	Irfan Ullah	7,581	5.70	
Independent	Muhammad Saif-ud-Din Khosa	3,601	2.71	
Others	Others (eight candidates)	2,584	1.94	
Turnout		136,293	55.46	
Total valid votes		133,009	97.59	
Rejected ballots		3,284	2.41	
Majority		1,029	0.77	
Registered electors		245,745		
hold				

== General elections 2018 ==
Provincial election 2018: PP-288 Dera Ghazi Khan-IV
Party	Candidate	Votes	%	±%
Independent	Mohsin Atta Khan Khosa	39,490	51.14	
PTI	Sardar Muhammad Saifuddin Khan Khosa	30,164	39.06	
TLP	Irfan Ullah	3,516	4.55	
Independent	Asim Zubair Khan Khosa	2,035	2.64	
AAT	Bilal Ahmed	1,079	1.40	
Independent	Abdul Hafeez	934	1.21	
Turnout		79,824	49.76	
Total valid votes		77,218	96.74	
Rejected ballots		2,606	3.26	
Majority		9,326	12.08	
Registered electors		160,417		

== General elections 2013 ==
Provincial election 2013: PP-243 Dera Ghazi Khan-IV
Party	Candidate	Votes	%	±%
PML(N)	Sirdar Zulfiqar Ali Khan Khosa	26,983	39.17	
Independent	Sardar Awais Ahmad Khan Leghari	21,606	31.36	
PTI	Ahmad Ali Khan Dareshak	14,952	21.70	
PPP	Sardar Muhammad Saif Ud Din Khan Khosa	2,069	3.00	
MDM	Muhammad Saleem	1,005	1.46	
Others	Others (thirteen candidates)	2,280	3.31	
Turnout		73,154	48.81	
Total valid votes		68,895	94.18	
Rejected ballots		4,259	5.82	
Majority		5,377	7.81	
Registered electors		149,880		

== General elections 2008 ==
Contesting candidates	Party affiliation	Votes polled

== See also ==
- PP-286 Dera Ghazi Khan-I
- PP-288 Dera Ghazi Khan-III
