= Rai Taimoor Khan =

Pakistani politician

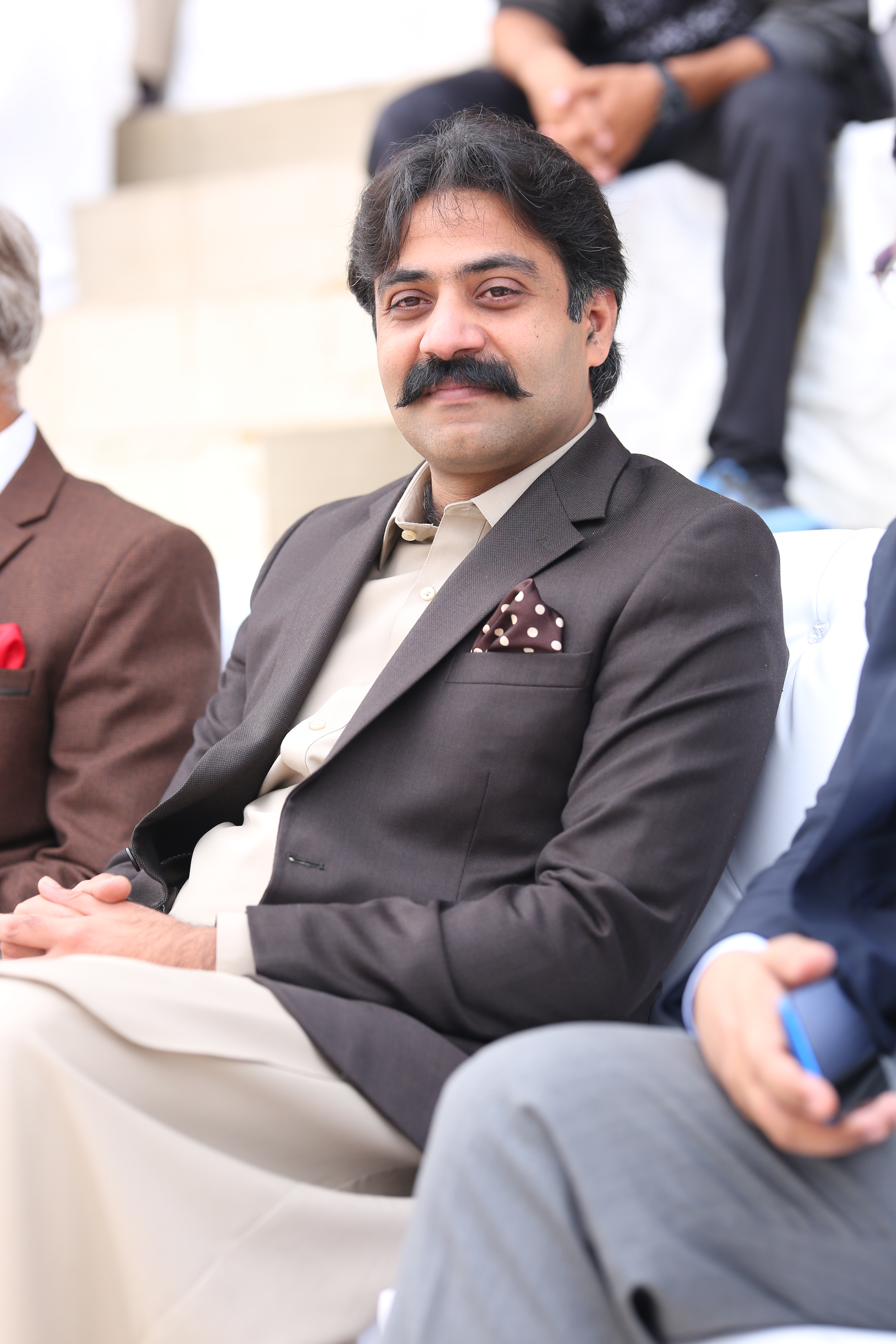

Provincial Minister for Youth Affairs, Sports & Tourism Punjab
- In office 27 August 2018 – 10 April 2022

Member of the Provincial Assembly of the Punjab
- In office 15 August 2018 – 14 January 2023
- Constituency: PP-124 Jhang-I

Personal details
- Born: 10 January 1988 (age 38) Jhang, Punjab, Pakistan
- Party: IPP (2025-present)
- Other political affiliations: PTI (2018-2023)

Rai Muhammad Taimoor Khan Bhatti is a Pakistani politician who was the Provincial Minister of Punjab for Youth Affairs, Sports, Archaeology and Tourism. He had been a member of the Provincial Assembly of the Punjab from August 2018 till January 2023. He became the youngest member of the provincial cabinet on 27 August 2018 when he was appointed the Provincial of Punjab for Youth Affairs and Sports Government of Punjab. On 19 July 2019 he was given the additional ministerial portfolio of Tourism.

== Early life and education ==
He was born on 10 January 1988 in Jhang, Punjab into a Punjabi Bhatti family to Liaqat Hayat Khan, who served Nazim District Council Jhang for two terms during 2001-08.

He graduated in 2008 from Bahauddin Zakariya University, Multan.

== Political career ==
He was elected to the Provincial Assembly of the Punjab as an independent candidate from Constituency PP-124 (Jhang-I) in the 2018 Pakistani general election.

He joined Pakistan Tehreek-e-Insaf (PTI) following his election.

On 27 August 2018, he was inducted into the provincial Punjab cabinet of Chief Minister Sardar Usman Buzdar and was appointed Provincial Minister of Punjab for Youth Affairs and Sports.

On 19 July 2019 he was given additional ministerial Portfolio of Provincial Minister of Punjab for Tourism. He contested General Election 2024 as an independent candidate but lost the seat to Ghulam Ahmed Gaddi. He received 35,483 votes.
