= Mumtaz Ahmad =

Pakistani politician

Member of the Provincial Assembly of Punjab
- Incumbent
- Assumed office 24 February 2024
- Constituency: PP-88 Mianwali-IV; Tehsil Piplan District Mianwali

Personal details
- Party: PTI (2010-present)

Malik Mumtaz Ahmad Assar is a Pakistani politician who has been a Member of the Provincial Assembly of the Punjab since 2024 from Tehsil Piplan, District Mianwali.

== Political career ==
Malik Mumtaz Ahmad started his political career by joining PTI in 2010.

He was awarded a party ticket by PTI for 2024 Pakisrani general election. He replaced Sibtain Khan, former PTI MPA from this constituency.

He was elected to the Provincial Assembly of the Punjab as a Pakistan Tehreek-e-Insaf-backed independent candidate from constituency PP-88 Mianwali-IV in the 2024 Pakistani general election. He defeated Ex MPA Malik Feroze Ahmad Joiya by a heavy margin of 9357 votes.
