= Syed Amir Ali Shah =

Pakistani politician

Member of the Provincial Assembly of the Punjab
- Incumbent
- Assumed office 24 February 2024
- Constituency: PP-250 Bahawalpur-VI

Personal details
- Party: PPP (2024-present)

Syed Amir Ali Shah is a Pakistani politician who has been a member of the Provincial Assembly of the Punjab since 24 February 2024.

== Political career ==
He was elected to the Provincial Assembly of the Punjab as a Pakistan People’s Party candidate from PP-250 Bahawalpur-IV in the 2024 Punjab provincial election. He was able to beat the runner-up Istehkam-e-Pakistan Party candidate, Makhdoom Syed Iftikhar Hassan Gillani. He took his oath as an MPA on 23 February 2024.
