= Makhdoom Syed Ali Raza Shah =

Pakistani politician

Syed Ali Raza Shah

Member of the Provincial Assembly of the Punjab
- In office 2008–2015
- In office 1988–1999

Personal details
- Born: 7 June 1946
- Died: 8 November 2015 (aged 69)
- Party: PMLN (2008-2015)
- Other political affiliations: PML-Q (2001-2008); PMLN (1997-1999); PPP (1993-1996); PMLN (1990-1993); Islami Jamhoori Ittehad (1988-1990); Pakistan Muslim League (1985-1988); PPP (1977-1985)
- Children: Syeda Sonia Ali Raza Shah (daughter); Syed Hussain Raza Shah (son)

Syed Ali Raza Shah (7 June 1946 – 8 November 2015) was a Pakistani politician who was a Member of the Provincial Assembly of the Punjab, from 2013 until his death in 2015.

== Political career ==
He was elected to the Provincial Assembly of the Punjab in 1977 Pakistani general election as a candidate of Pakistan Peoples Party.

He was elected to the National Assembly of Pakistan as well in 1985 Pakistani general election.

He was re-elected to the Provincial Assembly of the Punjab as a candidate of Islami Jamhoori Ittehad in 1988 Pakistani general election.

He was re-elected to the Provincial Assembly of the Punjab as a candidate of Islami Jamhoori Ittehad in 1990 Pakistani general election.

He was re-elected to the Provincial Assembly of the Punjab in 1993 Pakistani general election as a candidate of Pakistan Peoples Party.

He was defeated on the seat of Provincial Assembly of the Punjab in 1997 Pakistani general election.

His son Syed Hussain Raza Shah was elected to the Provincial Assembly of the Punjab in 2002 Pakistani general election on PML-Q ticket.

He was re-elected to the Provincial Assembly of the Punjab as a candidate of Pakistan Muslim League (Nawaz) from Constituency PP-89 (Toba Tek Singh-VI) in 2008 Pakistani general election.

He was re-elected to the Provincial Assembly of the Punjab as a candidate of Pakistan Muslim League (Nawaz) from Constituency PP-89 (Toba Tek Singh-VI) in 2013 Pakistani general election.
