= Chaudhry Arshad Javaid Warraich =

Pakistani politician (1956–2025)

Member of the Provincial Assembly of the Punjab
- In office 15 August 2018 – 14 January 2023
- Constituency: PP-44 Sialkot-X
- In office 29 May 2013 – 31 May 2018
- Constituency: PP-131 (Sialkot-XI)

Personal details
- Born: 13 December 1956 Sialkot, Punjab, Pakistan
- Died: 6 April 2025 (aged 68) Sialkot, Punjab, Pakistan
- Party: PMLN (2013–2025)
- Children: Hina Arshad Warraich (daughter)

Chaudhry Arshad Javaid Warraich (Urdu: چودھری ارشد جاوید وڑائچ; 13 December 1956 – 6 April 2025) was a Pakistani politician who was a Member of the Provincial Assembly of the Punjab from August 2018 till January 2023. Previously he had been a member of the Punjab Assembly from May 2013 to May 2018 and again from February 2024 to April 2025.

== Early life ==
Warraich was born on 13 December 1956.

== Political career ==
Warraich was elected to the Provincial Assembly of the Punjab as a candidate of Pakistan Muslim League (N) (PML-N) from Constituency PP-131 (Sialkot-XI) in the 2013 Pakistani general election.

He was re-elected to Provincial Assembly of the Punjab as a candidate of PML-N from Constituency PP-44 (Sialkot-X) in the 2018 Pakistani general election.

== Death ==
Warraich died on 6 April 2025, at the age of 68. He was buried in his ancestral graveyard.
