= Abdul Aziz Khan Dreshak =

Pakistani politician

Abdul Aziz Khan Dreshak is a Pakistani politician who was elected to be a member of the Provincial Assembly of the Punjab since 2024.

== Political career ==
He was elected to the 18th Provincial Assembly of the Punjab as a candidate of the Pakistan Muslim League (N) (PML-N) from constituency PP-295 Rajanpur-IV in the 2024 Pakistani general election.
