= Hanif Khan Pitafi =

Pakistani politician

Member of the Provincial Assembly of the Punjab
- Incumbent
- Assumed office 15 August 2018
- Constituency: PP-289 (Dera Ghazi Khan-V)

Personal details
- Party: PPP (2025-present)
- Other political affiliations: PMLN (2023-2025); PTI (2018-2023)

Hanif Khan Pitafi is a Pakistani politician who had been a member of the Provincial Assembly of the Punjab since August 2018.

== Political career ==
He was elected to the Provincial Assembly of the Punjab as an independent candidate from PP-289 (Dera Ghazi Khan-V) in the 2018 Punjab provincial election.

On 28 July 2018, he joined the Pakistan Tehreek-e-Insaf (PTI).

On 11 September 2018, he was inducted into the provincial cabinet of Chief Minister Usman Buzdar and was appointed advisor to the Chief Minister on Health.

He was re elected from PP-289 Dera Ghazi Khan-V as an independent Candidate in the 2024 Punjab provincial election.
