= PP-160 Lahore-XVI =

Constituency of the Provincial Assembly of Punjab, Pakistan

- Constituency for the Provincial Assembly of Punjab
- Region: Lahore City in Lahore District

Current constituency
- Created: 2018
- Created from: PP-152 Lahore-XVI & PP-156 Lahore-XX (2002-2018); PP-160 Lahore-XVII (2018-2023)

PP-160 Lahore-XVI (پی پی-160، لاہور-16) is a Constituency of Provincial Assembly of Punjab.

== General elections 2024 ==
Provincial election 2024: PP-160 Lahore-XVI
| Party | Candidate | Votes | % | ±% |
|---|---|---|---|---|
| PML(N) | Malik Asad Ali | 26,781 | 40.05 | |
| Independent | Azam Khan Niazi (Note: Filed nomination papers as PTI candidate but ECP allowed him to run as an Independent) | 21,249 | 31.78 | |
| TLP | Sajid Mehmood | 9,759 | 14.59 | |
| PPP | Mian Misbah Ur Rehman | 3,962 | 5.93 | |
| Others | Others (sixteen candidates) | 5,121 | 7.65 | |
| Turnout | | 68,008 | 40.84 | |
| Total valid votes | | 66,872 | 98.33 | |
| Rejected ballots | | 1,136 | 1.67 | |
| Majority | | 5,532 | 8.27 | |
| Registered electors | | 166,507 | | |
| hold | | | | |

== General elections 2018 ==
Provincial election 2018: PP-160 Lahore-XVII
| Party | Candidate | Votes | % | ±% |
|---|---|---|---|---|
| PTI | Mian Mahmood Ur Rashid | 63,136 | 51.04 | |
| PML(N) | Syed Touseef Hussain Shah | 50,579 | 40.89 | |
| TLP | Raza Masood | 6,428 | 5.20 | |
| AAT | Muhammad Shafiq | 2,016 | 1.63 | |
| PPP | Shakeel Ahmad Pasha | 1,034 | 0.84 | |
| Others | Others (eight candidates) | 499 | 0.40 | |
| Turnout | | 124,930 | 53.29 | |
| Total valid votes | | 123,692 | 99.01 | |
| Rejected ballots | | 1,238 | 0.99 | |
| Majority | | 12,557 | 10.15 | |
| Registered electors | | 234,426 | | |

== General elections 2013 ==
Provincial election 2013: PP-152 Lahore-XVI
| Party | Candidate | Votes | % | ±% |
|---|---|---|---|---|
| PTI | Dr. Murad Raas | 36,977 | 48.28 | |
| PML(N) | Khwaja Salman Rafique | 34,667 | 45.27 | |
| PPP | Javed Akhtar Ch. | 1,739 | 2.27 | |
| JI | Malik Shahid Aslam | 1,002 | 1.31 | |
| Others | Others (seventeen candidates) | 2,196 | 2.87 | |
| Turnout | | 77,377 | 54.94 | |
| Total valid votes | | 76,581 | 98.97 | |
| Rejected ballots | | 796 | 1.03 | |
| Majority | | 2,310 | 3.01 | |
| Registered electors | | 140,832 | | |

== See also ==
- PP-159 Lahore-XV
- PP-161 Lahore-XVII
