= Usama Leghari =

Pakistani politician (born 1981)

Member of the Provincial Assembly of the Punjab
- Incumbent
- Assumed office 24 February 2024
- Constituency: PP-287 Dera Ghazi Khan-II

Personal details
- Party: PMLN (2024-present)

Usama Leghari is a Pakistani politician who has been a Member of the Provincial Assembly of the Punjab since 2024. He won from PP-287 Dera Ghazi Khan-II.

== Political career ==
He was elected to the Provincial Assembly of the Punjab as a candidate of the Pakistan Muslim League (N) (PML-N) from constituency PP-287 Dera Ghazi Khan-II in the 2024 Pakistani general election.
