= PP-288 Dera Ghazi Khan-III =

Constituency of the Punjabi Provincial Legislature, Pakistan

- Constituency for the Provincial Assembly of Punjab
- Region: Dera Ghazi Khan city in Dera Ghazi Khan District

Current constituency
- Member: vacant
- Created from: PP-244 Dera Ghazi Khan-V (2002-2018); PP-289 Dera Ghazi Khan-V (2018-2023)

PP-288 Dera Ghazi Khan-III (پی پی-288، ڈيره غازى خان-3) is a Constituency of Provincial Assembly of Punjab.

== General elections 2024 ==
Provincial election 2024: PP-288 Dera Ghazi Khan-III
| Party | Candidate | Votes | % | ±% |
|---|---|---|---|---|
| Independent | Hanif Khan Pitafi | 43,486 | 39.06 | |
| Independent | Malik Muhammad Iqbal Saqib (Note: Filed nomination papers as PTI candidate but ECP allowed him to run as an Independent) | 39,778 | 35.73 | |
| PML(N) | Syed Abdul Aleem | 14,009 | 12.58 | |
| PPP | Sardar Dost M Khan Khosa | 3,658 | 3.29 | |
| JUI (F) | Muhammad Mudassir Irfan | 2,315 | 2.08 | |
| TLP | Muhammad Ahmad Memood | 2,129 | 1.91 | |
| Independent | Adeeb Ara | 2,050 | 1.84 | |
| Others | Others (twenty one candidates) | 3,908 | 3.51 | |
| Turnout | | 113,952 | 58.76 | |
| Total valid votes | | 111,333 | 97.70 | |
| Rejected ballots | | 2,619 | 2.30 | |
| Majority | | 3,708 | 3.33 | |
| Registered electors | | 193,935 | | |
| hold | | | | |

== General elections 2018 ==
Provincial election 2018: PP-289 Dera Ghazi Khan-V
| Party | Candidate | Votes | % | ±% |
|---|---|---|---|---|
| Independent | Hanif Khan Pitafi | 35,419 | 37.28 | |
| PTI | Shaheena Karim | 18,536 | 19.51 | |
| PML(N) | Syed Abdul Aleem | 14,760 | 15.54 | |
| Independent | Sardar Dost Muhammad Khan Khosa | 13,557 | 14.27 | |
| Independent | Sheikh Israr Ahmad | 3,832 | 4.03 | |
| MMA | Sheikh Usman Farooq | 3,425 | 3.61 | |
| TLP | Syed Munir Hussain | 1,674 | 1.76 | |
| PPP | Muhammad Ali Murad Khan | 1,605 | 1.69 | |
| Others | Others (twelve candidates) | 2,202 | 2.31 | |
| Turnout | | 98,465 | 49.28 | |
| Total valid votes | | 95,010 | 96.49 | |
| Rejected ballots | | 3,455 | 3.51 | |
| Majority | | 16,883 | 17.77 | |
| Registered electors | | 199,812 | | |

== General elections 2013 ==
Provincial election 2013: PP-244 Dera Ghazi Khan-V
| Party | Candidate | Votes | % | ±% |
|---|---|---|---|---|
| Independent | Syed Abdul Aleem | 22,213 | 29.80 | |
| PTI | Akhwand Humayun Raza Khan | 21,478 | 28.82 | |
| PML(N) | Sardar Muhammad Hassam Ud Din | 18,196 | 24.41 | |
| JI | Sheikh Usman Farooq | 4,474 | 6.00 | |
| PPP | Shibli Shab Khaiz Ghouri | 4,012 | 5.38 | |
| Independent | Zubair Ahmad Bhatti | 1,093 | 1.47 | |
| Others | Others (nineteen candidates) | 3,064 | 4.11 | |
| Turnout | | 76,660 | 47.36 | |
| Total valid votes | | 74,530 | 97.22 | |
| Rejected ballots | | 2,130 | 2.78 | |
| Majority | | 735 | 0.98 | |
| Registered electors | | 161,877 | | |

== See also ==
- PP-287 Dera Ghazi Khan-II
- PP-289 Dera Ghazi Khan-IV
