= Constituency W-341 =

Provincial constituency of Punjab, Pakistan

W-341
- Woman Reserved constituency for the Provincial Assembly of Punjab

Current constituency

W-341 is a reserved Constituency for women in the Provincial Assembly of Punjab.

== See also ==
- Punjab, Pakistan
