= PP-161 Lahore-XVII =

Constituency of the Provincial Assembly of Punjab, Pakistan

- Constituency for the Provincial Assembly of Punjab
- Region: Lahore City in Lahore District

Current constituency
- Created from: PP-152 Lahore-XVI (2002-2018); PP-155 Lahore-XII (2018-2023)

PP-161 Lahore-XVII (پی پی-161، لاہور-17) is a constituency of the Provincial Assembly of Punjab.

== General elections 2024 ==
Provincial election 2024: PP-161 Lahore-XVII
Party	Candidate	Votes	%	±%
Independent	Farrukh Javaid (Note: Filed nomination papers as PTI candidate but ECP allowed him to run as an Independent)	46,947	48.78	
PML(N)	Omer Sohail	28,855	29.98	
PPP	Faisal Mir	5,098	5.30	
TLP	Shahzeb Ahmad	4,544	4.72	
JI	Malik Shahid Aslam	3,109	3.23	
Independent	Chaudhry Murtaza Akram	2,925	3.04	
Others	Others (thirty eight candidates)	4,766	4.95	
Turnout		98,370	39.39	
Total valid votes		96,244	97.84	
Rejected ballots		2,126	2.16	
Majority		18,092	18.80	
Registered electors		249,732		
hold				

== General elections 2018 ==
Provincial election 2018: PP-155 Lahore-XII
Party	Candidate	Votes	%	±%
PML(N)	Malik Ghulam Habib Awan	39,515	45.97	
PTI	Javaid Anwar Awan	18,597	21.63	
PPP	Muhammad Israr ul Haq Butt	10,867	12.64	
TLI	Chaudhary Shahid Mehmood	7,680	8.93	
Independent	Muhammad Imran Butt	3,649	4.25	
AAT	Muhammad Asif	2,770	3.22	
MMA	Muhammad Badal	2,174	2.53	
Others	Others (twelve candidates)	712	0.82	
Turnout		88,827	55.92	
Total valid votes		85,964	96.78	
Rejected ballots		2,863	3.22	
Majority		20,918	24.34	
Registered electors		158,840		

== General elections 2013 ==
Provincial election 2013: PP-152 Lahore-XVI
Party	Candidate	Votes	%	±%
PTI	Dr. Murad Raas	36,977	48.28	
PML(N)	Khwaja Salman Rafique	34,667	45.27	
PPP	Javed Akhtar Ch.	1,739	2.27	
JI	Malik Shahid Aslam	1,002	1.31	
Others	Others (seventeen candidates)	2,196	2.87	
Turnout		77,377	54.94	
Total valid votes		76,581	98.97	
Rejected ballots		796	1.03	
Majority		2,310	3.01	
Registered electors		140,832		

== See also ==
- PP-160 Lahore-XVI
- PP-162 Lahore-XVIII
