= Neelam Jabbar Chaudhary =

Pakistani politician

Member of the Provincial Assembly of the Punjab
- Incumbent
- Assumed office 27 February 2024
- In office 20 February 2008 – 20 February 2013
- Constituency: PP-86 Toba Tek Singh-II

Personal details
- Political party: PPP (2008-present)

Neelam Jabbar Chaudhary is a Pakistani politician who has been a Member of the Provincial Assembly of the Punjab since 2024. Previously she has been a Member of the Provincial Assembly of the Punjab from 2008 to 2013.

== Political career ==
In the 2008 Pakistani general election, she was elected to the Provincial Assembly of the Punjab from Constituency PP-86 (Toba Tek Singh-II) as a candidate of Pakistan People's Party (PPP).

In the 2024 Pakistani general election, she secured a seat in the Provincial Assembly of the Punjab through a reserved quota for women as a candidate of PPP.
