= Constituency W-347 =

Provincial constituency of Punjab, Pakistan

W-347
- Woman Reserved constituency for the Provincial Assembly of Punjab

Current constituency

W-347 is a reserved Constituency for female in the Provincial Assembly of Punjab.

== See also ==
- Punjab, Pakistan
