= Safia Saeed =

Pakistani politician

Safia Saeed is a Pakistani politician who has been a Member of the Provincial Assembly of the Punjab since 2024.

== Political career ==
In the 2024 Pakistani general election, she secured a seat in the Provincial Assembly of the Punjab through a reserved quota for women as a candidate of Pakistan Muslim League (N) (PML-N).
