= Nargis Faiz Malik =

Pakistani politician

Member of the Provincial Assembly of the Punjab
- Incumbent
- Assumed office 27 February 2024
- Constituency: Women reserve Seat
- In office 20 February 2008 – 20 February 2013
- Constituency: Women reserve Seat

Personal details
- Party: PPP (2008-present)

Nargis Faiz Malik is a Pakistani politician who has been a member of the Provincial Assembly of the Punjab since 2024. Previously, she was a member of the Provincial Assembly of the Punjab from 2008 to 2013.

== Political career ==
In the 2008 Pakistani general election, she secured a seat in the Provincial Assembly of the Punjab through a reserved quota for women as a Pakistan People's Party (PPP) candidate.

In the 2024 Pakistani general election, she resecured a seat in the Provincial Assembly of the Punjab through a reserved quota for women as a PPP candidate.
