= Constituency W-327 =

Provincial constituency of Punjab, Pakistan

W-327
- Woman Reserved constituency for the Provincial Assembly of Punjab

Current constituency

Constituency W-327 is a reserved Constituency for female in the Provincial Assembly of Punjab.

== See also ==
- Punjab, Pakistan
