= Baba Falbous Christopher =

Member of the Provincial Assembly of Punjab (2024–2029)

- بابا فیلبوس کرِسٹوفر

Member of the Provincial Assembly of Punjab
- Incumbent
- Assumed office 27 February 2024
- Constituency: Reserved seat for minorities

Personal details
- Party: PMLN (2024-present)

Baba Falbous Christopher (Urdu: بابا فیلبوس کرِسٹوفر) is a Pakistani politician who is member of the Provincial Assembly of Punjab.

== Political career ==
Christopher was allotted a reserved seat for minorities in Provincial Assembly of Punjab after the 2024 Punjab provincial election as part of the reserved quota for Pakistan Muslim League (N).
