= Nausheen Adnan =

Pakistani politician

Member of the Provincial Assembly of the Punjab
- Incumbent
- Assumed office 27 February 2024

Personal details
- Party: PMLN (2024-present)

Nausheen Adnan is a Pakistani politician who has been a Member of the Provincial Assembly of the Punjab since 2024.

== Early life and education ==
Adnan was born on 4 October 1972, in Lahore. She holds an MA degree and works as an educationist.

== Political career ==
In the 2024 Pakistani general election, she secured a seat in the Provincial Assembly of the Punjab through a reserved quota for women as a candidate of Pakistan Muslim League (N) (PML-N).
