= PP-126 Jhang-II =

Constituency of Provincial Assembly of Punjab

- Constituency for the Provincial Assembly of Punjab
- Region: Jhang Tehsil (partly) in Jhang District

Current constituency
- Created from: PP-78 Jhang-VI (2002-2018); PP-127 Jhang-IV (2018-2023)

PP-126 Jhang-II (پی پی-126، جھنگ-2) is a constituency of Provincial Assembly of Punjab, Pakistan.

== General elections 2024 ==
Provincial election 2024: PP-126 Jhang-II
Party	Candidate	Votes	%	±%
Independent	Mehr Muhammad Nawaz (Note: Filed nomination papers as PTI candidate but ECP allowed him to run as an Independent)	45,408	37.17	
PML(N)	Mehr Muhammad Aslam	42,842	35.07	
Independent	Ahmed Nawaz	11,868	9.71	
PKI-Ch.Anwar	Zulfiqar Khan Nasir	5,192	4.25	
TLP	Muhammad Usman	4,316	3.53	
Independent	Khuram Abbass Sial	3,458	2.83	
JI	Bahadar Khan	2,190	1.79	
Others	Others (thirteen candidates)	6,900	5.65	
Turnout		126,746	55.47	
Total valid votes		122,174	96.39	
Rejected ballots		4,572	3.61	
Majority		2,566	2.10	
Registered electors		228,502		
hold				

== General elections 2018 ==
Provincial election 2018: PP-127 Jhang-IV
Party	Candidate	Votes	%	±%
Independent	Mehar Muhammad Aslam	27,535	24.06	
PTI	Mehar Muhammad Nawaz	26,765	23.39	
Independent	Khuram Abbas Sial	10,096	8.82	
Independent	Syed Noor Sultan	9,455	8.26	
Independent	Muhammad Mustafa	9,082	7.94	
Independent	Muhammad Hyder Ali Bokhari	7,504	6.56	
TLP	Amir Mehmood Shakir	7,271	6.36	
Independent	Hassan Abdu Rab En Nasir	6,406	5.60	
PPP	Muhammad Mansha	3,366	2.94	
Independent	Mehr Sultan Sikandar	2,241	1.96	
Independent	Mudassar Abbas	2,042	1.79	
PML(N)	Muhammad Saleem Tahir	1,956	1.71	
Others	Others (two candidates)	703	0.62	
Turnout		120,401	61.48	
Total valid votes		114,422	95.03	
Rejected ballots		5,979	4.97	
Majority		770	0.67	
Registered electors		195,839		

== General elections 2013 ==
Provincial election 2013: PP-78 Jhang-VI
Party	Candidate	Votes	%	±%
PML(N)	Rashida Yaqoob	42,870	37.60	
MDM	Molana Muhammad Ahmad Ludhianvi	40,938	35.90	
PTI	Doctor Abul Hassan Khan Ansari	10,217	8.96	
Independent	Sheikh Danial Iqbal	8,665	7.60	
Independent	Waqar Ahmad Ansari	5,950	5.22	
Independent	Syed Akhtar Abbas Sherazi	2,725	2.39	
Others	Others (thirty four candidates)	2,655	2.33	
Turnout		115,972	58.15	
Total valid votes		114,020	98.32	
Rejected ballots		1,952	1.68	
Majority		1,932	1.70	
Registered electors		199,428		

== General elections 2008 ==
Contesting candidates	Party affiliation	Votes polled

== See also ==
- PP-125 Jhang-I
- PP-127 Jhang-III
