= PP-263 Rahim Yar Khan-IX =

Constituency of the Punjabi Provincial Legislature, Pakistan

- Constituency for the Provincial Assembly of Punjab
- Region: R.Y.K Tehsil (partly) including Tarinda Saway Khan town of Rahim Yar Khan District

Current constituency
- Created from: PP-294 Rahimyar Khan-X (2002-2018); PP-263 Rahim Yar Khan-IX (2018-)

PP-263 Rahim Yar Khan-IX (پی پی-263، رحیم یار خان-9) is a Constituency of Provincial Assembly of Punjab.

== General elections 2024 ==
Provincial election 2024: PP-263 Rahim Yar Khan-IX
Party	Candidate	Votes	%	±%
Independent	Muhammad Naeem (Note: Filed nomination papers as PTI candidate but ECP allowed him to run as an Independent)	61,402	50.42	
PML(N)	Mahmood UI Hassan	46,220	37.96	
PPP	Javed Hassan	9,625	7.90	
Others	Others (eleven candidates)	4,530	3.72	
Turnout		124,267	52.91	
Total valid votes		121,777	98.00	
Rejected ballots		2,490	2.00	
Majority		15,182	12.46	
Registered electors		234,849		
hold				

== General elections 2018 ==
Provincial election 2018: PP-263 Rahim Yar Khan-IX
Party	Candidate	Votes	%	±%
PTI	Muhammad Shafiq	46,481	39.76	
PML(N)	Mahmood UI Hassan	42,023	35.95	
PPP	Syed Usman Mehmood	22,998	19.67	
Independent	Muhammad Waseem	1,437	1.23	
TLP	Uzma Sarwar	1,335	1.14	
Others	Others (four candidates)	2,620	2.24	
Turnout		119,095	61.30	
Total valid votes		116,894	98.15	
Rejected ballots		2,201	1.85	
Majority		4,458	3.81	
Registered electors		194,272		

== General elections 2013 ==
Provincial election 2013: PP-294 Rahim Yar Khan-X
Party	Candidate	Votes	%	±%
PML(N)	Mahmood Ul Hassan	33,409	35.83	
Independent	Muhammad Shafiq	21,952	23.54	
PPP	Javed Hassan	19,123	20.51	
PTI	Ch. Hasnain Waraich	12,504	13.41	
Independent	Rais Sher Muhammad Channa	3,396	3.64	
Others	Others (ten candidates)	2,863	3.07	
Turnout		96,632	61.54	
Total valid votes		93,247	96.50	
Rejected ballots		3,385	3.50	
Majority		11,457	12.29	
Registered electors		157,032		

== General elections 2008 ==
Contesting candidates	Party affiliation	Votes polled

== See also ==
- PP-262 Rahim Yar Khan-VIII
- PP-264 Rahim Yar Khan-X
