= PP-262 Rahim Yar Khan-VIII =

Constituency of the Punjabi Provincial Legislature, Pakistan

- Constituency for the Provincial Assembly of Punjab
- Region: Rahim Yar Khan city in Rahim Yar Khan District

Current constituency
- Created from: PP-293 Rahimyar Khan-IX (2002-2018); PP-262 Rahim Yar Khan-VIII (2018-)

PP-262 Rahim Yar Khan-VIII (پی پی-262، رحیم یار خان-8) is a Constituency of Provincial Assembly of Punjab.

== General elections 2024 ==
Provincial election 2024: PP-262 Rahim Yar Khan-VIII
Party	Candidate	Votes	%	±%
Independent	Chaudhry Asif Majeed (Note: Filed nomination papers as PTI candidate but ECP allowed him to run as an Independent)	54,789	52.86	
PML(N)	Muhammad Omer Jaffar	25,200	24.31	
PPP	Muhammad Riaz Solangi	12,035	11.61	
TLP	Rana Shahid Akram	5,001	4.83	
JI	Faisal Javid	2,838	2.74	
Others	Others (ten candidates)	3,785	3.65	
Turnout		105,007	47.10	
Total valid votes		103,648	98.71	
Rejected ballots		1,359	1.29	
Majority		29,589	28.55	
Registered electors		222,962		
hold				

== General elections 2018 ==
Provincial election 2018: PP-262 Rahim Yar Khan-VIII
Party	Candidate	Votes	%	±%
PTI	Chaudhry Asif Majeed	48,799	43.62	
PML(N)	Muhammad Umar Jaffar	33,708	30.13	
PPP	Muhammad Safdar Kanjo	12,899	11.53	
MMA	Anwaar UI Haq	7,272	6.50	
TLP	Muhammad Rashid Yaseen	4,214	3.77	
Independent	Rana Raheel Ahmad Khan	1,611	1.44	
AAT	Kashif Israr	1,501	1.34	
Independent	Muhammad Irshad	1,181	1.06	
Others	Others (four candidates)	697	0.62	
Turnout		113,429	53.67	
Total valid votes		111,882	98.64	
Rejected ballots		1,547	1.36	
Majority		15,091	13.49	
Registered electors		211,352		

== General elections 2013 ==
Provincial election 2013: PP-293 Rahim Yar Khan-IX
Party	Candidate	Votes	%	±%
PML(N)	Mohammad Umar Jaffar	29,650	30.51	
PTI	Rana Masud Majeed Khan	18,403	18.94	
Independent	Asif Majeed	18,301	18.83	
PPP	Javeed Akbar	12,513	12.88	
JI	Anwar Ul Haq	9,267	9.54	
Jamiat Ulema-e-Pakistan	Muhammad Riaz Noori	2,411	2.48	
Independent	Gul Jahanziab	2,072	2.13	
Independent	Muhammad Azeem Solungi	2,048	2.11	
Others	Others (thirteen candidates)	2,512	2.58	
Turnout		99,244	56.30	
Total valid votes		97,177	97.92	
Rejected ballots		2,067	2.08	
Majority		11,247	11.57	
Registered electors		176,271		

== General elections 2008 ==
Contesting candidates	Party affiliation	Votes polled

== See also ==
- PP-261 Rahim Yar Khan-VII
- PP-263 Rahim Yar Khan-IX
