= PP-130 Jhang-VI =

Constituency of the Punjabi Provincial Legislature, Pakistan

- Constituency for the Provincial Assembly of Punjab
- Region: Ahmedpur Sial Tehsil (partly) in Jhang District

Current constituency
- Created from: PP-82 Jhang-X (2002-2018); PP-130 Jhang-VII (2018-2023)

PP-130 Jhang-VI (پی پی-130، جھنگ-6) is a constituency of Provincial Assembly of Punjab, in Pakistan.

== General elections 2024 ==
Provincial election 2024: PP-130 Jhang-VI
Party	Candidate	Votes	%	±%
Independent	Rana Shahbaz Ahmad (Note: Filed nomination papers as PTI candidate but ECP allowed him to run as an Independent)	67,796	45.41	
PML(N)	Ameer Abbass Sial	59,987	40.18	
Independent	Muhammad Nawazish Ali Khan	16,474	11.03	
TLP	Muhammad Ramzan Mustafa	2,454	1.64	
Others	Others (eight candidates)	2,593	1.74	
Turnout		153,499	61.70	
Total valid votes		149,304	97.27	
Rejected ballots		4,195	2.73	
Majority		7,809	5.23	
Registered electors		248,781		
hold				

== General elections 2018 ==
Provincial election 2018: PP-130 Jhang-VII
Party	Candidate	Votes	%	±%
PTI	Shahbaz Ahmad	63,684	54.30	
Independent	Muhammad Aoun Abbas	48,449	41.31	
ARP	Nazar Abbas	2,029	1.73	
TLP	Muhammad Muzaffar	1,778	1.52	
Others	Others (three candidates)	1,352	1.15	
Turnout		120,992	64.32	
Total valid votes		117,292	96.94	
Rejected ballots		3,700	3.06	
Majority		15,235	12.99	
Registered electors		188,108		

== General elections 2013 ==
Provincial election 2013: PP-82 Jhang-X
Party	Candidate	Votes	%	±%
PML(N)	Mian Muhammad Azam	37,356	42.22	
Independent	Ghazanfar Ali Khan	34,932	39.48	
MWM	Syed Azhar Hussain Shah	8,643	9.77	
Independent	Mian Javed Yasin	5,341	6.04	
Others	Others (eleven candidates)	2,208	2.50	
Turnout		91,687	67.71	
Total valid votes		88,480	96.50	
Rejected ballots		3,207	3.50	
Majority		2,424	2.74	
Registered electors		135,409		

== General elections 2008 ==
Contesting candidates	Party affiliation	Votes polled

== See also ==
- PP-129 Jhang-V
- PP-131 Jhang-VII
