= Muhammad Tahir (Pakistani politician) =

Pakistani politician

Muhammad Tahir is a Pakistani politician who has been a Member of the Provincial Assembly of the Punjab since 2024.

== Political career ==
He was elected to the Provincial Assembly of the Punjab as a Istehkam-e-Pakistan Party from Constituency PP-284 Taunsa-I in the 2024 Pakistani general election.
