= Asad Mehmood (politician, born 1970) =

Pakistani politician

Member of the Provincial Assembly of Punjab
- Incumbent
- Assumed office 24 February 2024

Personal details
- Born: 10 January 1970 (age 56)
- Party: PTI (2024-present)

Asad Mehmood (born 10 January 1970) is a Pakistani politician who has been a Member of the Provincial Assembly of the Punjab since 2024.

== Political career ==
He was elected to the Provincial Assembly of the Punjab as a Pakistan Tehreek-e-Insaf-backed independent candidate from Constituency PP-112 Faisalabad-XV in the 2024 Pakistani general election.
