= Hina Arshad Warraich =

Pakistani politician

- حنا ارشد وڑائچ

Member of the Provincial Assembly of the Punjab
- Incumbent
- Assumed office 12 June 2025
- Constituency: PP-52 Sialkot-IX

Personal details
- Born: Sialkot, Punjab, Pakistan
- Party: PMLN (2025-present)
- Parent: Chaudhry Arshad Javaid Warraich (father)

Hina Arshad Warraich (Urdu: حنا ارشد وڑائچ) is a Pakistani politician who is serving as a member of the Provincial Assembly of the Punjab since 12 June 2025. She previously served as the chairperson of Sialkot District Council from December 2016 to December 2021. She is the daughter of former MPA Chaudhry Arshad Javaid Warraich.

== Political career ==
On 31 December 2016, she was sworn in as the chairperson of the Sialkot District Council. Her term ended on 31 December 2021.

She was elected to the Provincial Assembly of the Punjab from PP-52 Sialkot-IX as a candidate of Pakistan Muslim League (N) (PML(N)) in a June 2025 by-election. She received 78,702 votes, whereas Fakhir Nishat Ghumman, an independent supported by Pakistan Tehreek-e-Insaf (PTI), obtained 39,018 votes.
