= PP-163 Lahore-XIX =

Constituency of the Provincial Assembly of Punjab, Pakistan

- Constituency for the Provincial Assembly of Punjab
- Region: Lahore City in Lahore District

Current constituency
- Created from: PP-153 Lahore-XII (2002-2018); PP-158 Lahore-XV (2018-2023)

PP-163 Lahore-XIX (پی پی-162، لاہور-19) is a Constituency of Provincial Assembly of Punjab.

== General elections 2024 ==
Provincial election 2024: PP-163 Lahore-XIX
Party	Candidate	Votes	%	±%
PML(N)	Imran Javed	23,141	33.31	
Independent	Azeem Ullah Khan (Note: Filed nomination papers as PTI candidate but ECP allowed him to run as an Independent)	21,808	31.39	
TLP	Iqbal Farooq Sindho	7,926	11.41	
Independent	Muhammad Fiaz Bhatti	6,509	9.37	
Independent	Syed Ammar Haider Naqvi	3,322	4.78	
JI	Waqas Ahmad Butt	2,422	3.49	
Others	Others (twenty four candidates)	4,343	6.25	
Turnout		70,897	42.89	
Total valid votes		69,471	97.99	
Rejected ballots		1,426	2.01	
Majority		1,333	1.92	
Registered electors		165,296		
hold				

== General elections 2018 ==
Provincial election 2018: PP-158 Lahore-XV
Party	Candidate	Votes	%	±%
PTI	Abdul Aleem Khan	52,319	49.47	
PML(N)	Rana Ahsan	45,229	42.77	
TLP	Azhar Iqbal	6,273	5.93	
PPP	Arif Zafar	1,410	1.33	
Others	Others (nine candidates)	521	0.50	
Turnout		107,616	54.97	
Total valid votes		105,752	98.27	
Rejected ballots		1,864	1.73	
Majority		7,090	6.70	
Registered electors		195,777		

== General elections 2013 ==
Provincial election 2013: PP-153 Lahore-XII
Party	Candidate	Votes	%	±%
PML(N)	Ramzan Siddique Bhatti	51,590	59.59	
PTI	Shabbir Syal	20,031	23.14	
Independent	Mian Abdul Razzaq	5,674	6.55	
PPP	Mian Tariq Aziz	5,541	6.40	
Christian Progressive Movement	Amir Bernard	1,282	1.48	
Others	Others (twenty five candidates)	2,464	2.85	
Turnout		87,958	46.98	
Total valid votes		86,582	98.44	
Rejected ballots		1,376	1.56	
Majority		31,559	36.45	
Registered electors		187,239		

== General elections 2008 ==
Contesting candidates	Party affiliation	Votes polled

== See also ==
- PP-162 Lahore-XVIII
- PP-164 Lahore-XX
