= Chaudhry Asif Majeed =

Pakistani politician

Member of the Provincial Assembly of the Punjab
- In office 15 August 2018 – 14 January 2023
- Constituency: PP-262 Rahim Yar Khan-VIII

Personal details
- Party: PTI (2018-present)

Chaudhry Asif Majeed is a Pakistani politician who was a member of the Provincial Assembly of the Punjab from August 2018 till January 2023.

== Political career ==
He was elected to the Provincial Assembly of the Punjab as a candidate of Pakistan Tehreek-e-Insaf from Constituency PP-262 (Rahim Yar Khan-VIII) in the 2018 Pakistani general election.
