= Yaroo =

Yaroo Khosa
- Union council and town
- Location in Pakistan
- Coordinates: 30°10′33″N 70°37′2″E
- Country: Pakistan
- Province: Punjab
- District: Dera Ghazi Khan District
- Elevation: 397 ft (121 m)
- Time zone: UTC+5 (PST)
  - Summer (DST): +6

Yaroo khosa is a village located at 13 km away from Dera Ghazi khan in province of Punjab, Pakistan. The mountains are 20 km away. The people speak Balochi and jatki in this village.
