= PP-52 Sialkot-IX =

Constituency of the Punjabi Provincial Legislature, Pakistan

- Constituency for the Provincial Assembly of Punjab
- Region: Daska Tehsil (partly) Sambrial Tehsil (partly) including Sambrial city of Sialkot District

Current constituency
- Created from: PP-131 Sialkot-XII (2002–2018); PP-44 Sialkot-X (2018-2023)

PP-52 Sialkot-IX (پی پی-52، سيالكوٹ-9) is a Constituency of Provincial Assembly of Punjab.

== By-election June 2025 ==
A by-election was held on 1 June 2025 due to the death of Choudhry Arshad Javaid Warraich, the previous MPA from this seat. Hina Arshad Warraich won the election with 78,818 votes

By-election 2025: PP-52 Sialkot-IX
Party	Candidate	Votes	%	±%
PML(N)	Hina Arshad Warraich	78,818	60.02	▲17.94
Independent	Fakhir Nashat Ghumman (Note: Filed nomination papers as PTI candidate but ECP allowed him to run as an Independent)	38,974	29.68	▼6.30
PPP	Raheel Kamran Cheema	7,280	5.54	▲4.18
TLP	Muhammad Shafqat	4,803	3.66	▼4.76
Others	Others (ten candidates)	1,436	1.10	
Turnout		133,565	44.94	▼5.16
Total valid votes		131,311	98.31	
Rejected ballots		2,254	1.69	
Majority		39,844	30.34	▲24.24
Registered electors		297,185		
PML(N) hold				

== General elections 2024 ==
Provincial election 2024: PP-52 Sialkot-IX
Party	Candidate	Votes	%	±%
PML(N)	Chaudhry Arshad Javaid Warraich	58,414	42.08	
Independent	Fakhir Nashat Ghumman	49,939	35.98	
TLP	Muhammad Shafqat	11,684	8.42	
Independent	Omer Shehzad Ghumman	4,340	3.13	
Independent	Fayyaz Iqbal Cheema	2,675	1.93	
JI	Muhammad Shafique	2,515	1.81	
Others	Others (twenty two candidates)	9,244	6.65	
Turnout		141,928	50.10	
Total valid votes		138,811	97.80	
Rejected ballots		3,117	2.20	
Majority		8,475	6.10	
Registered electors		283,280		
PML(N) hold				

== General elections 2018 ==
Provincial election 2018: PP-44 Sialkot-X
Party	Candidate	Votes	%	±%
PML(N)	Choudhry Arshad Javaid Warraich	58,041	51.34	
PTI	Chaudhary Muhammad Azeem Ghumman	45,818	40.53	
TLP	Rafi Muhammad	3,199	2.83	
PPP	Muhammad Shahid Ghumman	2,453	2.17	
Others	Others (eight candidates)	3,536	3.13	
Turnout		115,694	57.80	
Total valid votes		113,047	97.71	
Rejected ballots		2,647	2.29	
Majority		12,223	10.81	
Registered electors		200,154		

== General elections 2013 ==
Provincial election 2013: PP-131 Sialkot-XI
Party	Candidate	Votes	%	±%
PML(N)	Choudhry Arshad Javaid Warraich	39,820	41.97	
PML(Q)	Ch. Muhammad Azeem Noori Ghumman	31,499	33.20	
Independent	Amjad Cheema	10,130	10.68	
PTI	Ch. Hooran Zia Ghumman	6,890	7.26	
Independent	Ch. Liaqat Ali Ghumman	2,950	3.11	
JI	Farrukh Ejaz Ghumman	2,116	2.23	
Others	Others (ten candidates)	1,472	1.55	
Turnout		98,967	59.13	
Total valid votes		94,877	95.87	
Rejected ballots		4,090	4.13	
Majority		8,321	8.77	
Registered electors		167,372		

== General elections 2008 ==
Provincial election 2008: PP-131 Sialkot-XI
Party	Candidate	Votes	%	±%
PML(N)	Liaqat Ali Ghuman	34,823	45.44	
PML(Q)	Ch.Muhammad Azeem Noori Ghumman	25,605	33.41	
PPP	Ch.Saif Ullah Cheema.	13,651	17.81	
Independent	Ch.Abdul Qayyum Bajwa Advocate	2,428	3.17	
Others	Others	129	0.17	
Turnout		79,065	54.72	
Total valid votes		76,636	96.93	
Rejected ballots		2,429	3.07	
Majority		9,218	12.03	
Registered electors		144,502		

== See also ==
- PP-51 Sialkot-VIII
- PP-53 Sialkot-X
