= PP-162 Lahore-XVIII =

Constituency of the Provincial Assembly of Punjab, Pakistan

- Constituency for the Provincial Assembly of Punjab
- Region: Lahore City in Lahore District

Current constituency
- Created: 2018
- Created from: PP-151 Lahore-XV and PP-152 Lahore-XVI (2002-2018); PP-161 Lahore-XVIII (2018-2023)

PP-162 Lahore-XVIII (پی پی-162، لاہور-18) is a Constituency of Provincial Assembly of Punjab.

== General elections 2024 ==
Provincial election 2024: PP-162 Lahore-XVIII
Party	Candidate	Votes	%	±%
PML(N)	Shahbaz Ali Khokhar	43,427	43.82	
Independent	Shabbir Ahmad (Note: Filed nomination papers as PTI candidate but ECP allowed him to run as an Independent)	40,508	40.88	
JI	Khalid Ahmad	3,983	4.02	
PPP	Manzar Abbas Malik	3,202	3.23	
Independent	Malik Nisar Ahmad Khokhar	2,685	2.71	
TLP	Sarfraz Hussain Babar	2,594	2.62	
Others	Others (thirty five candidates)	2,694	2.72	
Turnout		101,066	43.67	
Total valid votes		99,093	98.05	
Rejected ballots		1,973	1.95	
Majority		2,919	2.94	
Registered electors		231,442		
hold				

== General elections 2018 ==
Provincial election 2018: PP-161 Lahore-XVIII
Party	Candidate	Votes	%	±%
PTI	Malik Nadeem Abbas	35,040	47.68	
PML(N)	Faisal Ayub	30,994	42.18	
TLP	Malik Sher Zaman	3,937	5.36	
MMA	Ameer Ul Azim	2,503	3.41	
Others	Others (seven candidates)	1,010	1.37	
Turnout		74,629	51.68	
Total valid votes		73,484	98.47	
Rejected ballots		1,145	1.53	
Majority		4,046	5.50	
Registered electors		144,419		

== General elections 2013 ==
Provincial election 2013: PP-151 Lahore-XV
Party	Candidate	Votes	%	±%
PTI	Mian Mehmood Ur Rasheed	58,183	49.08	
PML(N)	Syed Tauseef Hussain Shah	54,374	45.87	
JI	Ch. Mehmood Ul Ahad	1,890	1.59	
MWM	Asad Abbas Shah	1,528	1.29	
PPP	Faheem Jameel Thakar	1,224	1.03	
Others	Others (twenty seven candidates)	1,337	1.13	
Turnout		119,465	54.67	
Total valid votes		118,536	99.22	
Rejected ballots		929	0.78	
Majority		3,809	3.21	
Registered electors		218,510		

== See also ==
- PP-161 Lahore-XVII
- PP-163 Lahore-XIX
