= PP-282 Layyah-IV =

Constituency of the Punjabi Provincial Legislature, Pakistan

- Constituency for the Provincial Assembly of Punjab
- Region: Layyah Tehsil (partly) including Layyah City of Layyah District

Current constituency
- Member: vacant
- Created from: PP-266 Layyah-V (2002-2018); PP-284 Layyah-V (2018-2023)

PP-282 Layyah-IV (پی پی-282، ليہ-4) is a Constituency of Provincial Assembly of Punjab.

== General elections 2024 ==
Provincial election 2024: PP-282 Layyah-IV
Party	Candidate	Votes	%	±%
Independent	Usama Asghar Ali Gujjar (Note: Filed nomination papers as PTI candidate but ECP allowed him to run as an Independent)	53,960	41.51	
Independent	Hashim Hussain	27,395	21.07	
IPP	Syed Rafaqat Ali Gillani	23,920	18.40	
PPP	Ghulam Farid Khan Mirani	13,848	10.65	
TLP	Muhammad Azeem UI Haq	4,906	3.77	
Others	Others (fourteen candidates)	5,979	4.60	
Turnout		132,913	59.08	
Total valid votes		130,008	97.81	
Rejected ballots		2,905	2.19	
Majority		26,565	20.44	
Registered electors		224,975		
hold				

== General elections 2018 ==
Provincial election 2018: PP-284 Layyah-V
Party	Candidate	Votes	%	±%
Independent	Syed Rafaqat Ali Gillani	33,062	29.32	
Independent	Hashim Hussain	19,654	17.43	
MMA	Ch. Asghar Ali Gujjar	17,752	15.74	
PTI	Saeeda Begum	13,232	11.73	
Independent	Ghulam Fareed Khan Mirani	8,133	7.21	
Independent	Muhammad Tufail Ahmed	5,434	4.82	
PPP	Maher Yasir Waseem	5,146	4.56	
Independent	Abid Anwar Alvi	3,304	2.93	
TLP	Muhammad Azeem Ul Haq	2,254	2.00	
Independent	Muhammad Kamran Roohani	1,756	1.56	
Independent	Malik Javed Iqbal	1,076	0.95	
Others	Others (five candidates)	1,975	1.75	
Turnout		116,965	63.59	
Total valid votes		112,778	96.42	
Rejected ballots		4,187	3.58	
Majority		13,408	11.89	
Registered electors		183,950		

== General elections 2013 ==
Provincial election 2013: PP-266 Layyah-V
Party	Candidate	Votes	%	±%
Independent	Chaudhery Ishfaq Ahmed	31,499	33.38	
PPP	Ghulam Farid Khan Mirani	23,051	24.43	
Independent	Mehar Fazal Hussain Sumra	18,942	20.07	
PTI	Malik Hashim Hussain Saho	13,469	14.27	
Independent	Syed Ghulam Haider Rizvi	4,875	5.17	
Others	Others (eleven candidates)	2,525	2.68	
Turnout		100,774	64.73	
Total valid votes		94,361	93.64	
Rejected ballots		6,413	6.36	
Majority		8,448	8.95	
Registered electors		155,679		

== General elections 2008 ==
Contesting candidates	Party affiliation	Votes polled

== See also ==
- PP-281 Layyah-III
- PP-283 Layyah-V
