= Zulfiqar Ali Bhatti (politician, born 1972) =

- ذوالفقارعلی بھٹی

Member of the Provincial Assembly of Punjab
- Incumbent
- Assumed office 24 February 2024

Personal details
- Political party: PTI (2024-present)

Zulfiqar Ali Bhatti (Urdu: ذوالفقار علی بھٹی; is a Pakistani politician who has been a Member of the Provincial Assembly of the Punjab since 2024.

== Political career ==
He was elected to the Provincial Assembly of the Punjab as a Pakistan Tehreek-e-Insaf-backed independent candidate from constituency PP-76 Sargodha-VI in the 2024 Pakistani general election.
