= PP-264 Rahim Yar Khan-X =

Constituency of the Punjabi Provincial Legislature, Pakistan

- Constituency for the Provincial Assembly of Punjab
- Region: R.Y.K Tehsil (partly) and Sadiqabad Tehsil (partly) of Rahim Yar Khan District

Current constituency
- Created from: PP-292 Rahimyar Khan-VIII (2002-2018); PP-264 Rahim Yar Khan-X (2018-)

PP-264 Rahim Yar Khan-X (پی پی-264، رحیم یار خان-10) is a Constituency of Provincial Assembly of Punjab.

== General elections 2024 ==
Provincial election 2024: PP-264 Rahim Yar Khan-X
Party	Candidate	Votes	%	±%
PPP	Habib ur Rehman Khan	44,288	39.16	
Independent	Abdul Momin (Note: Filed nomination papers as PTI candidate but ECP allowed him to run as an Independent)	31,920	28.23	
PML(N)	Zohair Tariq	20,505	18.13	
TLP	Muhammad Akram	5,111	4.52	
Independent	Atta Ullah	2,556	2.26	
Independent	Muhammad Nabeel Dahir	2,252	1.99	
Others	Others (twelve candidates)	6,424	5.71	
Turnout		117,693	49.21	
Total valid votes		113,086	96.09	
Rejected ballots		4,607	3.91	
Majority		12,368	10.93	
Registered electors		239,160		
hold				

== General elections 2018 ==
Provincial election 2018 : PP-264 Rahim Yar Khan X
Party	Candidate	Votes	%	±%
PPP	Syed Usman Mehmood	51,458	52.50	
PML(N)	Muhammad Tariq	21,905	22.35	
PTI	Maryam Batool	13,683	13.96	
Independent	Muhammad Hashmi	10,977	11.20	
Turnout		101,828	54.74	
Total valid votes		98,023	96.26	
Rejected ballots		3,805	3.73	
Majority		29,553	30.15	
Registered electors		186,021		

== General elections 2013 ==
Provincial election 2013 : PP-292 Rahim Yar Khan VIII
Party	Candidate	Votes	%	±%
PPP	Makhdoom Syed Mustafa Mehmood	36,068	44.61	
Independent	Molvi Muhammad Tariq Chuhan	19,713	24.38	
PML(N)	Makhdoom Alumberdar Hussain Hashmi	14,685	18.16	
PTI	Makhdoom Naveed Hussain	7,540	9.33	
Others	Others (ten candidates)	2,840	3.51	
Turnout		84,165	57.65	
Total valid votes		80,846	96.06	
Rejected ballots		3,319	3.94	
Majority		16,355	20.23	
Registered electors		146,005		

== General elections 2008 ==
Contesting candidates	Party affiliation	Votes polled

== See also ==
- PP-263 Rahim Yar Khan-IX
- PP-265 Rahim Yar Khan-XI
