= PP-265 Rahim Yar Khan-XI =

Constituency of the Punjabi Provincial Legislature, Pakistan

- Constituency for the Provincial Assembly of Punjab
- Region: Sadiqabad Tehsil (partly) including Sadiqabad city of Rahim Yar Khan District

Current constituency
- Created from: PP-296 Rahimyar Khan-XII (2002-2018); PP-267 Rahim Yar Khan-XIII (2018-2023)

PP-265 Rahim Yar Khan-XI (پی پی-265، رحیم یار خان-11) is a Constituency of Provincial Assembly of Punjab.

== General elections 2024 ==
Provincial election 2024: PP-265 Rahim Yar Khan-XI
Party	Candidate	Votes	%	±%
Independent	Sajjad Ahmad (Note: Filed nomination papers as PTI candidate but ECP allowed him to run as an Independent)	52,817	43.16	
PML(N)	Chudhary Muhammad Shafique Anwar	42,017	34.33	
PPP	Muhammad Akmal	15,414	12.59	
TLP	Siddique Ahnad	3,946	3.22	
Independent	Farhad Ali	3,380	2.76	
JI	Riaz Qadier Saddiqi	2,008	1.64	
Others	Others (eight candidates)	2,808	2.30	
Turnout		125,003	52.94	
Total valid votes		122,390	97.91	
Rejected ballots		2,613	2.09	
Majority		10,800	8.83	
Registered electors		236,118		
hold				

== General elections 2018 ==
Provincial election 2018: PP-267 Rahim Yar Khan-XIII
Party	Candidate	Votes	%	±%
PML(N)	Chaudhary Muhammad Shafique Anwar	42,422	41.65	
PTI	Sajjad Ahmad	42,029	41.26	
PPP	Rana Tariq Mehmood Khan	9,563	9.39	
Independent	Muhammad Majeed	3,941	3.87	
TLP	Noman Khalid	2,363	2.32	
Others	Others (eight candidates)	1,537	1.51	
Turnout		104,562	59.57	
Total valid votes		101,855	97.41	
Rejected ballots		2,707	2.59	
Majority		393	0.39	
Registered electors		175,528		

== General elections 2013 ==
Provincial election 2013: PP-296 Rahim Yar Khan-XII
Party	Candidate	Votes	%	±%
PML(N)	Chauhdary Muhammad Shafique	46,375	47.09	
PTI	Chaudary Shaukat Dawood	24,722	25.10	
PPP	Rana Tariq Mehmood Khan	24,165	24.53	
JI	Muhammad Hafeez Waraich	1,660	1.69	
Others	Others (twelve candidates)	1,570	1.59	
Turnout		100,223	59.87	
Total valid votes		98,492	98.27	
Rejected ballots		1,731	1.73	
Majority		21,653	21.99	
Registered electors		167,406		

== General elections 2008 ==
Contesting candidates	Party affiliation	Votes polled

== See also ==
- PP-264 Rahim Yar Khan-X
- PP-266 Rahim Yar Khan-XII
