= Sarah Ahmad =

Pakistani politician and child rights activist (born 1986)

- Ahmad in 2026

Member of the Provincial Assembly of the Punjab
- Incumbent
- Assumed office 27 February 2024
- Constituency: Reserved seat for women

Chairperson of the Child Protection & Welfare Bureau Punjab
- Incumbent
- Assumed office 8 February 2019

Personal details
- Born: 17 November 1986 (age 39) Karachi, Sindh, Pakistan
- Party: IPP (2024-present)
- Education: Institute of Business Management, Karachi (MBA)

Sarah Ahmad (Urdu: سارہ احمد; born 17 November 1986) is a Pakistani politician and child rights activist. She has been serving as the chairperson of the Child Protection and Welfare Bureau in Punjab since 8 February 2019. She was elected as a member of the Punjab Provincial Assembly on a seat reserved for women in 2024. She represented Pakistan at the United Nations Conference on Violence Against Children that was held in New York on 19 September 2023.

== Recognitions and awards ==
In 2022, she received the Global Collaborative Award in Rome, Italy.

In March 2024, she was presented with Pakistan’s Woman of Courage Award by Donald Blome, the United States Ambassador to Pakistan. She is the first Pakistani woman to receive it.

On 23 March 2024, she was awarded Tamgha-e-Imtiaz.
