= PP-129 Jhang-V =

Constituency of the Punjabi provincial legislature, Pakistan

- Constituency for the Provincial Assembly of Punjab
- Region: Ahmedpur Sial Tehsil (partly) and Shorkot Tehsil including Shorkot city in Jhang District

Current constituency
- Created from: PP-83 Jhang-XI (2002-2018); PP-129 Jhang-VI (2018-2023)

PP-129 Jhang-V (پی پی-129، جھنگ-5) is a constituency of the Provincial Assembly of Punjab, Pakistan.

== General elections 2024 ==
Provincial election 2024: PP-129 Jhang-V
Party	Candidate	Votes	%	±%
Independent	Mian Muhammad Asif Kathia (Note: Filed nomination papers as PTI candidate but ECP allowed him to run as an Independent)	37,315	28.22	
PML(N)	Khalid Ghani	28,585	21.62	
PML(Q)	Madhulal Hussain	16,871	12.76	
Independent	Ali Abbass Khan	16,545	12.51	
Independent	Muhammad Qamar Hayyat	13,591	10.28	
PPP	Shahbaz Ali	7,726	5.84	
Independent	Saima Akhter	4,995	3.78	
Others	Others (ten candidates)	6,617	4.99	
Turnout		137,408	59.50	
Total valid votes		132,245	96.24	
Rejected ballots		5,163	3.76	
Majority		8,730	6.60	
Registered electors		230,948		
hold				

== General elections 2018 ==
Provincial election 2018: PP-129 Jhang-VI
Party	Candidate	Votes	%	±%
PTI	Mian Muhammad Asif	23,434	20.66	
Independent	Madhu Lal Hussain	22,431	19.78	
Independent	Khalid Ghani	22,048	19.44	
Independent	Muhammad Qamar Hayat	15,886	14.01	
Independent	Ali Abbas Khan	11,494	10.14	
MMA	Shahbaz Ali	8,202	7.23	
Independent	Sultan Muhammad Mushtaq Salim	4,222	3.72	
Independent	Farzand Ali	3,039	2.68	
Others	Others (four candidates)	2,653	2.35	
Turnout		118,122	63.10	
Total valid votes		113,409	96.01	
Rejected ballots		4,713	3.99	
Majority		1,003	0.88	
Registered electors		187,204		

== General elections 2013 ==
Provincial election 2013: PP-83 Jhang-XI
Party	Candidate	Votes	%	±%
Independent	Muhammad Aaun Abbas	40,928	43.50	
PML(N)	Shahbaz Ahmad	32,126	34.14	
Independent	Sahibzada Muhammad Tahir Sultan	14,295	15.19	
PTI	Ghulam Ghazi	5,766	6.13	
Others	Others (six candidates)	972	1.03	
Turnout		98,601	68.65	
Total valid votes		94,087	95.42	
Rejected ballots		4,514	4.58	
Majority		8,802	9.36	
Registered electors		143,633		

== General elections 2008 ==
Contesting candidates	Party affiliation	Votes polled

== See also ==
- PP-128 Jhang-IV
- PP-130 Jhang-VI
