= PP-284 Tonsa-I =

Constituency of the Punjabi Provincial Legislature, Pakistan

PP-284 Taunsa-I
- Constituency for the Provincial Assembly of Punjab
- Region: Taunsa Tehsil (partly), Vehowa Tehsil (partly) and Koh e Sulman Tehsil of Taunsa District

Current constituency
- Member: vacant
- Created from: PP-240 Dera Ghazi Khan-I (2002-2018); PP-285 Dera Ghazi Khan-I (2018-2023)

PP-284 Taunsa-I (پی پی-284، تونسہ-1) is a Constituency of Provincial Assembly of Punjab.

== General elections 2024 ==
Provincial election 2024: PP-284 Taunsa-I
Party	Candidate	Votes	%	±%
Independent	Muhammad Tahir (Note: Filed nomination papers as PTI candidate but ECP allowed him to run as an Independent)	52,620	35.47	
PML(N)	Sardar Mir Badshah Khan Qaisrani	48,883	32.95	
Independent	Muhammad Jaffar Budzar	14,568	21.24	
JUI (F)	Aman Ullah Akhtar	6,435	4.34	
JI	Aziz Ullah	5,682	3.83	
Others	Others (fifteen candidates)	3,214	2.17	
Turnout		154,307	56.41	
Total valid votes		148,347	96.14	
Rejected ballots		5,960	3.86	
Majority		3,737	2.52	
Registered electors		273,554		
hold				

== General elections 2018 ==
Provincial election 2018: PP-285 Dera Ghazi Khan-I
Party	Candidate	Votes	%	±%
PTI	Khawaja Muhammad Daud Sulemani	27,884	30.86	
Independent	Sardar Meer Badshah Khan	26,172	28.97	
Independent	Muhammad Tahir	18,602	20.59	
ARP	Abdul Majeed	4,776	5.29	
Independent	Maqsood Alam	3,505	3.88	
Independent	Umar Asghar Khan Khitran	2,933	3.25	
Independent	Ghulam Mustafa Khan	2,796	3.10	
Others	Others (eighteen candidates)	3,683	4.06	
Turnout		94,305	52.05	
Total valid votes		90,351	95.81	
Rejected ballots		3,954	4.19	
Majority		1,712	1.89	
Registered electors		181,184		

== General elections 2013 ==
Provincial election 2013: PP-240 Dera Ghazi Khan-I
Party	Candidate	Votes	%	±%
JUI (F)	Sardar Meer Badasha Khan Qaisraani	28,821	35.11	
Independent	Khawja Muhammad Daod Sulmani	26,508	32.29	
PML(N)	Sardar Imam Bakhsh Khan Qaisrani	16,433	20.02	
PTI	Sardar Muhammad Iqbal Khan Qaisrani	7,867	9.58	
Others	Others (nine candidates)	2,459	3.00	
Turnout		84,883	56.89	
Total valid votes		82,088	96.71	
Rejected ballots		2,795	3.29	
Majority		2,313	2.82	
Registered electors		149,198		

== General elections 2008 ==
Contesting candidates	Party affiliation	Votes polled

== See also ==
- PP-283 Layyah-V
- PP-285 Taunsa-II
