= PP-286 Dera Ghazi Khan-I =

Constituency of the Punjabi Provincial Legislature, Pakistan

- Constituency for the Provincial Assembly of Punjab
- Region: Dera Ghazi Khan Tehsil (partly) of Dera Ghazi Khan District

Current constituency
- Member: vacant
- Created from: PP-242 Dera Ghazi Khan-III (2002-2018); PP-287 Dera Ghazi Khan-III (2018-2023)

PP-286 Dera Ghazi Khan-I (پی پی-286، ڈيره غازى خان-1) is a Constituency of Provincial Assembly of Punjab.

== General elections 2024 ==
Provincial election 2024: PP-286 Dera Ghazi Khan-I
Party	Candidate	Votes	%	±%
PML(N)	Salah-ud-Din Khan	37,689	37.96	
Independent	Farhat Abbas Balouch (Note: Filed nomination papers as PTI candidate but ECP allowed him to run as an Independent)	35,740	36.00	
Independent	Javeed Akthar	18,511	18.64	
TLP	Muhammad Muti Ullah Khan	2,932	2.95	
Others	Others (eleven candidates)	4,412	4.45	
Turnout		102,933	50.71	
Total valid votes		99,284	96.45	
Rejected ballots		3,649	3.55	
Majority		1,949	1.96	
Registered electors		202,944		
hold				

== General elections 2018 ==
Provincial election 2018: PP-287 Dera Ghazi Khan-III
Party	Candidate	Votes	%	±%
PTI	Javeed Akhtar	42,847	52.91	
Independent	Mohsin Atta Khan Khosa	33,716	41.63	
PPP	Muhammad Arif	1,985	2.45	
MMA	Arshad Abbas	1,629	2.01	
Others	Others (four candidates)	805	0.99	
Turnout		83,415	53.87	
Total valid votes		80,982	97.08	
Rejected ballots		2,433	2.92	
Majority		9,131	11.28	
Registered electors		154,852		

== General elections 2013 ==
Provincial election 2013: PP-242 Dera Ghazi Khan-III
Party	Candidate	Votes	%	±%
Independent	Javeed Akhtar	28,173	40.37	
PML(N)	Mohsin Atta Khan Khosa	27,289	39.11	
PTI	Atta Ullah Khosa	6,383	9.15	
PPP	Sardar Muhammad Irfan Ullah Khan Khosa	5,512	7.90	
Others	Others (eight candidates)	2,424	3.47	
Turnout		72,180	49.42	
Total valid votes		69,781	96.68	
Rejected ballots		2,399	3.32	
Majority		884	1.26	
Registered electors		146,048		

== General elections 2008 ==
Contesting candidates	Party affiliation	Votes polled

== See also ==
- PP-285 Taunsa-II
- PP-287 Dera Ghazi Khan-II
