= PP-285 Tonsa-II =

Constituency of the Punjabi Provincial Legislature, Pakistan

PP-285 Taunsa-II
- Constituency for the Provincial Assembly of Punjab
- Region: Taunsa Tehsil (partly) including Taunsa city and Vehowa Tehsil (partly) of Taunsa District

Current constituency
- Member: vacant
- Created from: PP-241 Dera Ghazi Khan-II (2002-2018); PP-286 Dera Ghazi Khan-II (2018-2023)

PP-285 Taunsa-II (پی پی-285، تونسہ-2) is a Constituency of Provincial Assembly of Punjab.

== General elections 2024 ==
Provincial election 2024: PP-285 Taunsa-II
Party	Candidate	Votes	%	±%
Independent	Salah Ud Din Akbar (Note: Filed nomination papers as PTI candidate but ECP allowed him to run as an Independent)	31,871	27.64	
PPP	Sardar Muhammad Akram Khan	26,428	22.92	
Independent	Khawaja Muhammad Dawood Sulemani	24,273	21.05	
PML(N)	Kh Muhammad Nizam UI Mehmood	21,456	18.61	
TLP	Tariq Mahmood Khan	4,237	3.68	
JI	Mazhar Mehmood	3,997	3.47	
Others	Others (nine candidates)	3,032	2.63	
Turnout		119,541	58.90	
Total valid votes		115,294	96.45	
Rejected ballots		4,247	3.55	
Majority		5,443	4.72	
Registered electors		202,941		
hold				

== General elections 2018 ==
Provincial election 2018: PP-286 Dera Ghazi Khan-II
Party	Candidate	Votes	%	±%
PTI	Usman Ahmad Khan Buzdar	27,027	35.34	
Independent	Khawaja Muhammad Nizam UI Mehmood	18,686	24.43	
Independent	Sardar Muhammad Akram Khan	16,377	21.41	
PPP	Muhammad Hayyat	3,732	4.88	
ARP	Tariq Mehmood Khan	2,862	3.74	
MMA	Atta Muhammad Jafri	2,685	3.51	
Independent	Khawaja Mughees Ullah	1,423	1.86	
Independent	Abdul Salam Buzdar	1,182	1.55	
TLP	Mushtaq Anmed Mundrani	1,105	1.45	
Others	Others (seven candidates)	1,410	1.84	
Turnout		79,752	53.25	
Total valid votes		76,489	95.91	
Rejected ballots		3,263	4.09	
Majority		8,341	10.91	
Registered electors		149,775		

== General elections 2013 ==
Provincial election 2013: PP-241 Dera Ghazi Khan-II
Party	Candidate	Votes	%	±%
PPP	Khawaja Muhammad Nizam ul Mehmood	27,825	33.53	
PML(N)	Usman Ahmad Khan Buzdar	22,875	27.56	
PML(Q)	Sardar Muhammad Akram Khan	17,030	20.52	
PTI	Muhammad Hayat Buzdar	7,801	9.40	
BNP (M)	Khawaja Muhammad Abdul Qasim	2,656	3.20	
Independent	Ahmad Farooq Khan	1,919	2.31	
NP	Khan Muhammad	1,320	1.59	
Others	Others (seven candidates)	1,563	1.88	
Turnout		85,421	55.79	
Total valid votes		82,989	97.15	
Rejected ballots		2,432	2.85	
Majority		4,950	5.97	
Registered electors		153,102		

== General elections 2008 ==
Contesting candidates	Party affiliation	Votes polled

== See also ==
- PP-284 Taunsa-I
- PP-286 Dera Ghazi Khan-I
