= PP-88 Mianwali-IV =

Constituency of the Punjabi Provincial Legislature, Pakistan

- Constituency for the Provincial Assembly of Punjab
- Region: Piplan Tehsil of Mianwali District

Current constituency
- Created from: PP-46 Mianwali-IV (2002-2018); PP-88 Mianwali-IV (2018-)

PP-88 Mianwali-IV (پی پی-88، مِيانوالى-4) is a Constituency of Provincial Assembly of Punjab.

== General elections 2024 ==
Provincial election 2024: PP-88 Mianwali-IV
Party	Candidate	Votes	%	±%
Independent	Mumtaz Ahmad (Note: Filed nomination papers as PTI candidate but ECP allowed him to run as an Independent)	67,525	45.27	
PML(N)	Malik Muhammad Feroze Joiya	59,306	39.76	
TLP	Saqib Mehmood Sajid	13,509	9.06	
Independent	Muhammad Meharban	2,522	1.69	
Others	Others (twelve candidates)	6,314	4.22	
Turnout		154,060	59.10	
Total valid votes		149,176	96.83	
Rejected ballots		4,884	3.17	
Majority		8,219	5.51	
Registered electors		260,674		
hold				

== General elections 2018 ==
Provincial election 2018: PP-88 Mianwali-IV
Party	Candidate	Votes	%	±%
PTI	Mohammad Sibtain Khan	56,016	42.98	
PML(N)	Malik Muhammad Feroze Joyia	38,046	29.19	
TLP	Malik Shahzad Iqbal	15,858	12.17	
Independent	Saqib Mahmood Sajid	12,769	9.80	
Independent	Malik Muhammad Saqib Zia	1,841	1.41	
PPP	Rukhsana Begum	1,539	1.18	
Independent	Mazhar Hussain	1,505	1.16	
Others	Others (five candidates)	2,758	2.12	
Turnout		134,656	60.82	
Total valid votes		130,332	96.79	
Rejected ballots		4,324	3.21	
Majority		17,970	13.79	
Registered electors		221,421		

== General elections 2013 ==
Provincial election 2013: PP-46 Mianwali-IV
Party	Candidate	Votes	%	±%
PTI	Muhammad Sibtain Khan	53,110	46.38	
PML(N)	Malik Muhammad Feroz Joyia	42,810	37.38	
Independent	Saeed Ahmed	13,766	12.02	
Independent	Rab Nawaz Khan	1,858	1.62	
JI	Muhammad Saleem	1,288	1.12	
PPP	Rukhsana Bunyad	1,059	0.92	
Others	Others (three candidates)	622	0.54	
Turnout		118,728	65.26	
Total valid votes		114,513	96.45	
Rejected ballots		4,215	3.55	
Majority		10,300	9.00	
Registered electors		181,940		

== General elections 2008 ==
Contesting candidates	Party affiliation	Votes polled

== See also ==
- PP-87 Mianwali-III
- PP-89 Bhakkar-I
