= PP-125 Jhang-I =

Constituency of the Punjabi Provincial Legislature, Pakistan

- Constituency for the Provincial Assembly of Punjab
- Region: Jhang Tehsil (partly) of Jhang District

Current constituency
- Created from: PP-81 Jhang-IX (2002-2018); PP-124 Jhang-I (2018-2023)

PP-125 Jhang-I (پی پی-125، جھنگ-1) is a constituency of the Provincial Assembly of Punjab, in Pakistan. It includes the regions of Jhang Tehsil (partly) of Jhang District.

== General elections 2024 ==
Provincial election 2024: PP-125 Jhang-I
Party	Candidate	Votes	%	±%
Independent	Sardar Alhaj Ghulam Ahmad Khan Gadi (Note: Filed nomination papers as PTI candidate but ECP allowed him to run as an Independent)	55,756	37.96	
PML(N)	Faisal Saleh Hayat	38,489	26.21	
Independent	Muhammad Taimoor Khan	35,486	24.16	
Independent	Neelam Sial	6,574	4.48	
Independent	Usman Akram	2,992	2.04	
TLP	Haq Nawaz	2,203	1.50	
JI	Muhammad Zuabir	2,067	1.41	
Others	Others (eleven candidates)	3,307	2.24	
Turnout		152,042	58.79	
Total valid votes		146,874	96.60	
Rejected ballots		5,168	3.40	
Majority		17,267	11.75	
Registered electors		258,613		
hold				

== General elections 2018 ==
Provincial election 2018: PP-124 Jhang-I
Party	Candidate	Votes	%	±%
Independent	Muhammad Taimoor Khan	32,143	27.73	
PPP	Syed Ali Akbar	24,255	20.92	
PTI	Sardar Al Haaj Ghulam Ahmad Khan Gadi	23,504	20.28	
Independent	Aleesha Iftiknar	19,319	16.67	
Independent	Kareem Bakhsh	12,947	11.17	
AAT	Muhammad Mansha	1,758	1.52	
Others	Others (six candidates)	1,994	1.72	
Turnout		122,387	59.71	
Total valid votes		115,920	94.72	
Rejected ballots		6,467	5.28	
Majority		7,888	6.81	
Registered electors		204,986		

== General elections 2013 ==
Provincial election 2013: PP-81 Jhang-IX
Party	Candidate	Votes	%	±%
PML(N)	Iftikhar Ahmad Khan	41,700	36.62	
Independent	Syed Muhammad Abbas Shah	35,936	31.56	
Independent	Ghulam Ahmad Khan Gadi	28,566	25.09	
PPP	Kawish Dewan Bhutta	2,907	2.55	
JI	Ghulam Qanber	2,499	2.19	
Others	Others (fourteen candidates)	2,267	1.99	
Turnout		119,630	64.60	
Total valid votes		113,875	95.19	
Rejected ballots		5,755	4.81	
Majority		5,764	5.06	
Registered electors		185,178		

== General elections 2008 ==
Contesting candidates	Party affiliation	Votes polled

== See also ==
- PP-124 Toba Tek Singh-VI
- PP-126 Jhang-II
