= PP-283 Layyah-V =

Constituency of the Punjabi Provincial Legislature, Pakistan

- Constituency for the Provincial Assembly of Punjab
- Region: Layyah Tehsil (partly) of Layyah District

Current constituency
- Member: vacant
- Created from: PP-265 Layyah-IV (2002-2018); PP-283 Layyah-IV (2018-2023)

PP-283 Layyah-V (پی پی-283، ليہ-5) is a Constituency of Provincial Assembly of Punjab.

== General elections 2024 ==
Provincial election 2024: PP-283 Layyah-V
| Party | Candidate | Votes | % | ±% |
|---|---|---|---|---|
| Independent | Ghulam Asghar Khan (Note: Filed nomination papers as PTI candidate but ECP allowed him to run as an Independent) | 57,086 | 42.01 | |
| PML(N) | Muhammad Ijaz Ahmad Achlana | 52,306 | 38.50 | |
| PPP | Ghulam Ishaq Khan | 6,566 | 4.83 | |
| Independent | Muhammad Asad Ullah | 6,287 | 4.63 | |
| Independent | Faiz Ahmad | 4,964 | 3.65 | |
| TLP | Muhammad Ilyas | 4,901 | 3.61 | |
| Independent | Sajjad Hussain Khan | 2,346 | 1.73 | |
| Others | Others (eleven candidates) | 1,419 | 1.04 | |
| Turnout | | 139,431 | 63.62 | |
| Total valid votes | | 135,875 | 97.45 | |
| Rejected ballots | | 3,556 | 2.55 | |
| Majority | | 4,780 | 3.51 | |
| Registered electors | | 219,147 | | |
| hold | | | | |

== General elections 2018 ==
Provincial election 2018: PP-283 Layyah-IV
| Party | Candidate | Votes | % | ±% |
|---|---|---|---|---|
| PML(N) | ijaz Ahmad | 46,405 | 41.13 | |
| PTI | Sajjad Hussain Khan | 44,180 | 39.16 | |
| PPP | Syed Fazal Hussain Gillani | 14,785 | 13.11 | |
| TLP | Irshad Hussain | 2,218 | 1.97 | |
| Independent | Aon Bin Sajjad | 1,438 | 1.28 | |
| Independent | Ishfaq Ahmed | 1,324 | 1.17 | |
| Others | Others (six candidates) | 2,466 | 2.18 | |
| Turnout | | 116,113 | 67.16 | |
| Total valid votes | | 112,816 | 97.16 | |
| Rejected ballots | | 3,297 | 2.84 | |
| Majority | | 2,225 | 1.97 | |
| Registered electors | | 172,892 | | |

== General elections 2013 ==
Provincial election 2013: PP-265 Layyah-IV
| Party | Candidate | Votes | % | ±% |
|---|---|---|---|---|
| PML(N) | Mehr Ejaz Ahmad Achlana | 34,305 | 35.19 | |
| PPP | Sajjad Hussain Khan | 29,190 | 29.94 | |
| Independent | Makhdoom Syed Fazal Hussain Shah | 15,297 | 15.69 | |
| PTI | Asghar Ali Mailwana | 8,758 | 8.98 | |
| Independent | Syed Khalid Mahmood | 5,206 | 5.34 | |
| JUI (F) | Maher Ahmad Ali Wandar | 3,695 | 3.79 | |
| Others | Others (five candidates) | 1,035 | 1.06 | |
| Turnout | | 101,200 | 72.68 | |
| Total valid votes | | 97,486 | 96.33 | |
| Rejected ballots | | 3,714 | 3.67 | |
| Majority | | 5,115 | 5.25 | |
| Registered electors | | 139,250 | | |

== General elections 2008 ==
| Contesting candidates | Party affiliation | Votes polled |

== See also ==
- PP-282 Layyah-IV
- PP-284 Taunsa-I
