= 2024 Punjab provincial election =

Provincial Election in Pakistan

- 8 February 2024

297 out of 371 seats in the Punjab Assembly (Note: 66 seats are reserved for women and 8 are reserved for non-Muslims filled through Proportional representation) 186 seats needed for a majority
- Registered: 73,207,896
- Turnout: 51.6% (▼4.84pp)
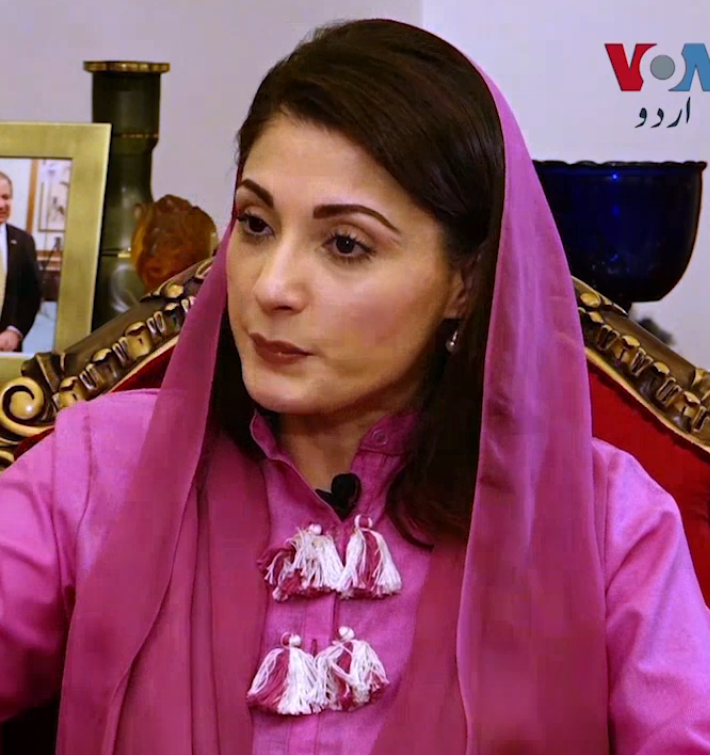

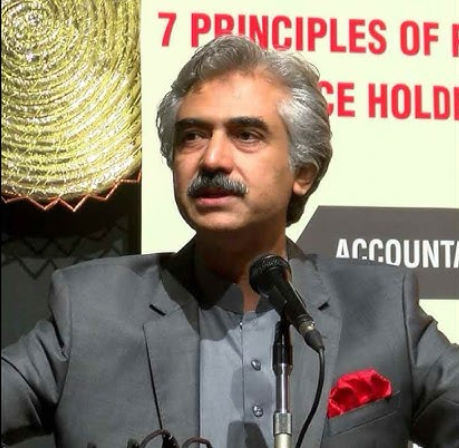
	First party	Second party
Leader	Maryam Nawaz	Mian Aslam Iqbal
Party	PML(N)	IND (backed by PTI)
Leader since	3 January 2023	-
Leader's seat	Lahore-XV	Lahore-XXVII
Last election	31.88%, 164 seats	33.72%, 184 seat
Seats won	204	106
Seat change	▲53	▼78
Popular vote	11,487,876	12,183,610
Percentage	32.05%	34.00%
Swing	▲0.17pp	▲0.28pp
- Map of Punjab Showing Assembly constituencies and winning parties
Chief Minister before election
Chaudhry Pervaiz Elahi
PML(Q)
Elected Chief Minister
Maryam Nawaz
PML(N)

Provincial elections were held in the Pakistani province of Punjab on 8 February 2024 to elect a new provincial legislature. On 5 August 2023, the results of the 2023 digital census were approved by the Council of Common Interests headed by Prime Minister Shehbaz Sharif. Therefore, elections have been delayed for several months, as new delimitations will be published on 14 December 2023, as announced by the Election Commission of Pakistan (ECP). On 19 November 2023, the ECP announced, in agreement with the President of Pakistan, Arif Alvi, that the elections will be held on 8 February 2024. The election was held concurrently with nationwide general elections and other provincial elections.

== Background ==
In the 2018 election, the Pakistan Tehreek-e-Insaf (PTI) emerged as the largest party in the Provincial Assembly of Punjab after 25 independents joined it. However, the PTI was still 2 seats short of a majority. After the Pakistan Muslim League (Q) (PML(Q)) agreed to support the PTI, they formed a coalition government in the province. The Pakistan Muslim League (N) (PML(N)) emerged as the second largest party and formed the opposition.

During a political crisis in Pakistan after the successful no-confidence motion against Prime Minister Imran Khan, another motion of no confidence was filed against Chief Minister Usman Buzdar, as well as against Chaudhry Pervaiz Elahi and Dost Muhammad Mazari, the Speaker and Deputy Speaker of the Provincial Assembly, respectively. Buzdar resigned before a vote on the motion of no confidence could be held and as a consequence, an election for a new Chief Minister was scheduled on 16 April between PML(N)'s Hamza Shahbaz, the joint candidate of the Pakistan Democratic Movement (PDM), and PML(Q)'s Chaudhry Pervaiz Elahi, the joint candidate of his party and PTI. On the day of the election, 25 PTI MPAs crossed the floor to support Shahbaz, violating party policy. During the very beginning of the Assembly session on 16 April, a riot began between PTI and PML-N supporters. PTI MPAs threw ewers at the Deputy Speaker, as well as slapping him. The police entered the Assembly for the first time in its history and arrested 3 MPAs. The Deputy Speaker then presided over the Assembly session in the visitors gallery and declared Shahbaz the winner by securing 197 votes.

After the floor crossing, the Election Commission of Pakistan (ECP) de-seated 25 dissident PTI MPAs for defection in the light of Article 63-A of the Constitution of the Islamic Republic of Pakistan on 20 May 2022. Five of these MPAs were elected on reserved seats (3 for women and 2 for minorities) and new PTI MPAs were notified on these seats on 7 July.

By-elections were held on 17 July 2022 to elect the remaining 20 members. The PTI won in a landslide, emerging victorious on 15 of those 20 seats, leading to the collapse of Chief Minister Hamza Shahbaz's PML-N led coalition government, as their coalition became 7 seats short of a majority. Elahi took oath as the Chief Minister of Punjab on 27 July 2022, leading a PTI-PML(Q) coalition government.

On 12 January 2023, after winning a vote of confidence the night before, Elahi sent a letter to Governor Baligh Ur Rehman, advising him to dissolve the Provincial Assembly. Rehman excused himself from the dissolution process and after 48 hours, the Assembly automatically stood dissolved. Elections must be conducted within 90 days of the dissolution, meaning by or before 14 April 2023.

On 22 January 2023, Mohsin Raza Naqvi took oath as the caretaker Chief Minister of Punjab. He was nominated by the Election Commission of Pakistan (ECP) after days of deadlock between the government and the opposition over who to nominate.

On 10 February 2023, after weeks of no announcement of an election date, the Lahore High Court (LHC) ordered the ECP to immediately announce the date for the elections to "ensure that [they] are held not later than ninety days as per the mandate of the Constitution".

On 20 February 2023, the ECP had still not announced the date for the election. Therefore, President Arif Alvi decided to unilaterally appoint 9 April 2023 as the election date.

On 1 March 2023, in a 3-2 split verdict, the Supreme Court ruled that President Alvi's order of appointing an election date was "constitutionally competent", as the Assembly was dissolved without the order of Governor Rehman. However, the verdict further stated that due to the delays in the announcement of the election date, 9 April may not be a feasible election date. Therefore, the ECP was ordered to immediately propose a date with the "minimum possible delay" to the President and after consultation, the latter shall announce a date for the election.

As a result of the verdict, on 3 March 2023, the ECP had suggested the dates of 30 April to 7 May to President Alvi and on the same day, the latter announced that the provincial election will be held on 30 April 2023.

On 22 March 2023, in violation of the Supreme Court's verdict, the ECP postponed the provincial election to 8 October 2023, stating that it had arrived at the conclusion that it could not hold the elections "honestly, justly, fairly, in a peaceful manner and in a accordance with the Constitution and law".

On 25 March 2023, Sibtain Khan, the Speaker of the Provincial Assembly of Punjab, filed a constitutional petition on behalf of the PTI against the ECP's decision. Additionally, a contempt of court petition was also filed against the ECP. On 4 April, the Supreme Court ruled that the ECP's decision to postpone the polls was unconstitutional and itself fixed 14 May 2023 as the new date for the election.

Despite the orders of the Supreme Court, the ECP had not conducted the elections on 14 May and had instead petitioned the Supreme Court to review its 4 April decision, claiming that they "[don't] have the authority to give the date of elections".

=== Ban on PTI from contesting as a party ===
On 22 December 2023, the ECP decided against letting the PTI retain its electoral symbol, arguing that the party had failed to hold intra-party elections. On 22 December, the PTI approached the Peshawar High Court (PHC) against the ECP's order and hence, a single-member bench suspended the ECP's order until 9 January 2024. On 30 December 2023, the ECP filed a review application within the PHC, and days later, a two-member bench withdrew the suspension order as it heard the case. However, on 10 January 2024, the two-member bench had declared the ECP's order to be "illegal, without any lawful authority, and of no legal effect. On 11 January, the ECP challenged this ruling in the Supreme Court, and on 13 January, a three-member bench ruled in favor of the ECP and stripped the PTI of its electoral symbol. As a consequence of this ruling, the PTI could not allot party tickets to any of its candidates. Therefore, all candidates of the party will be listed as independent candidates and each will have a different electoral symbol.

== Schedule ==
The schedule of the election was announced by the Election Commission of Pakistan on 15 December 2023.

Sr no	Poll Event	Schedule
1	Public Notice Issued by the Returning Officers	19 December 2023
2	Dates of filing Nomination papers with the Returning Officers by the candidates	20 December 2023 to 24 December 2023
3	Publication of names of the nominated candidates.	24 December 2023
4	Last date of scrutiny of nomination papers by the Returning Officer	25 December 2023 to 30 December 2023
5	Last date of filing appeals against decisions of the Returning Officer rejecting/accepting nomination papers.	3 January 2024
6	Last date for deciding of appeals by the Appellate Tribunal	10 January 2024
7	Publication of revised list of candidates	11 January 2024
8	Last date of withdrawal of candidate and publication of revised list of candidates	12 January 2024
9	Allotment of election symbol to contesting candidates	13 January 2024
10	Date of Polling and Counting of Votes	8 February 2024

== Electoral system ==
The 371 seats of the Punjab Assembly consist of 297 general seats, whose members are elected by the first-past-the-post voting system runs through single-member constituencies. 66 seats are reserved for women and 8 seats are reserved for non-Muslims. The members on these seats are elected through proportional representation based on the total number of general seats secured by each political party.

== Campaign ==
=== Pakistan Tehreek-e-Insaf ===
==== Joining of former PML(Q) MPAs ====
A day after the Assembly was dissolved, the Pakistan Muslim League (Q) (PML(Q)) Punjab president and outgoing Chief Minister, Chaudhry Pervaiz Elahi, hinted at a possible merger of the PML(Q) with the Pakistan Tehreek-e-Insaf (PTI). As a consequence, the president of the PML(Q) and former Prime Minister, Chaudhry Shujaat Hussain, who is also Elahi's cousin, issued him a show-cause notice and suspended his party membership. On the other hand, the office-bearers of the PML(Q)'s electoral college authorized Elahi to take decisions on behalf of the party, in regards to the potential merger.

On 21 February 2023, after failing in his attempts to merge the PML(Q) with the PTI, Elahi, along with all other nine former PML(Q) MPAs, joined the PTI.

==== General campaign ====
The PTI announced that it would start its election campaign on 8 March 2023. Imran Khan, the former Prime Minister and the Chairman of the PTI, stated that party workers will start arranging corner meetings and rallies across all districts of Punjab. Khan also said that he will suggest solutions to problems caused by the incumbent PDM-led federal government.

On 8 March 2023, the PTI attempted to start its campaign by taking out a rally from Khan's residence at Zaman Park to Data Darbar. However, just prior to the start of the rally, a ban on public gatherings was imposed in the provincial capital of Lahore and dozens were taken into police custody for violating the ban. Due to the increased violence, Khan called off the rally. One PTI worker, Ali Bilal, also lost his life in the violence, with Khan claiming the Punjab police had murdered Bilal.

On 12 March 2023, Khan once more announced to hold a rally in Lahore but a ban on public gatherings by the PTI was again imposed in the city. The PTI was finally allowed to hold the rally on 13 March 2023 starting from Khan's residence at Zaman Park to Data Darbar. Moreover, in his address to thousands of party workers and rally attendees, Khan announced that the party would hold a grand "power show" at the Minar-e-Pakistan on 19 March.

On 19 March, the Pakistan Muslim League (Z), a minor political party based in Bahawalnagar, was merged into the PTI by its president, Ijaz-ul-Haq, the son of the former President of Pakistan Zia-Ul-Haq.

On 23 March, the Awami Raj Party, a minor political party based in Muzaffargarh, was merged into the PTI by its chairman and leader Jamshed Dasti.

On 25 March, after two postponements, the PTI held its public rally at the Minar-e-Pakistan. Imran Khan had delivered a lengthy speech where he outlined a 10-point programme which he said would pull Pakistan out of its economic crisis. This programme included policies such as promoting tourism, expanding the minerals sector, reintroducing welfare programs, and enlarging the tax net.

On 20 April, the PTI had finalised a list candidates for most of the 297 constituencies of the Provincial Assembly.

== Opinion polls ==
Polling firm	Last date of polling	Link	PTI	PML(N)	PPP	TLP	Other	Ind.	Lead	Sample size	Undecideds & Non-voters (Note: This is a column that lists the percentage of undecided voters and non-voters in certain polls that publish this data. As some polls do not publish any data whatsoever on undecided voters and non-voters, the columns with survey participants that had a preference when polled are all that is needed to reach 100%. In surveys that do include data on non-voters and undecided voters, a scaling factor is applied to the margin of error and the rest of the data (for example, if the number of undecideds and non-voters equals 20%, each party would have their vote share scaled up by a factor of 100/80 (the formula is 100/(100-UndecidedPercentage)). This is done to keep consistency between the different polls and the different types data they provide.)
Gallup Pakistan	30 June 2023	PDF	41%	28%	4%	6%	21%		13%	3,500	N/A (Note: This poll or crosstabulation did not include any data about undecided voters or non-voters and cut them out completely from the published results.)
PA	14 January 2023	The Provincial Assembly is dissolved and the scheduled snap election called by ECP is postponed by Central Government to coincide with General Elections on 8 Feb 2024									
NA	11-12 April 2022	Imran Khan is removed from office in a no-confidence motion									
IPOR (IRI)	21 March 2022	PDF	34%	42%	6%	2%	16%		8%	~1,900	N/A
Gallup Pakistan	31 January 2022	PDF	24%	30%	5%	2%	6%	2%	6%	~3,100	31%
IPOR (IRI)	9 January 2022	PDF	31%	46%	5%	3%	15%		15%	2,035	N/A
IPOR (IRI)	11 November 2020	PDF	26%	39%	5%	2%	27%	1%	13%	1,089	N/A
2018 Elections	25 July 2018	ECP	33.6%	31.7%	5.4%	5.7%	4.8%	18.8%	1.9%	33,218,101	N/A

== Results ==
=== Result by Party ===
Vote Share of different parties in the election.
1. PTI (34.0%)
2. PMLN (32.0%)
3. TLP (6.84%)
4. PPP (5.53%)
5. IPP (1.57%)
6. JI (1.51%)
7. PML(Q) (1.15%)
8. PRHP (0.60%)
9. JUI (F) (0.49%)
10. PML(Z) (0.31%)
11. Independents (15.3%)
12. Other Parties (0.69%)
Seat Share of different parties in the election.
1. PMLN (60.0%)
2. PTI (30.3%)
3. PPP (4.41%)
4. PML(Q) (2.94%)
5. IPP (1.76%)
6. TLP (0.29%)
7. PML(Z) (0.29%)

Party	Votes	%	Seats				
Party	Votes	%	General	Independents joined	Women	Minority	Total
PMLN	11,487,876	32.05	138	▲15	44	7	204
PTI	12,183,610	34.00	103	0	0	0	103
TLP	2,449,844	6.84	1	0	0	0	1
PPP	1,981,025	5.53	11	▲1	3	1	15
IPP	564,082	1.57	1	▲1	–	0	6
JIP	541,049	1.51	0	0	0	0	0
PML(Q)	412,972	1.15	8	0	2	0	10
PRHP	215,034	0.60	0	0	0	0	0
JUI (F)	174,243	0.49	0	0	0	0	0
PML(Z)	109,570	0.31	1	0	0	0	1
Independents	5,472,237	15.27	23	▼12	0	0	0
Other	246,490	0.69	0	0	0	0	0
Total	35,838,032	100.00	286	0	49	8	340
Source: ECP Gallup

=== Results by region ===
Region	Seats	IND (Note: Endorsed by Pakistan Tehreek-e-Insaf)	PML(N)	PML(Q)	PPP	IPP	IND	Others	Election Postponed
North Punjab	24	11	13	0	0	0	0	0	0
Central Punjab	180	69	90	7	0	1	12	1	0
South Punjab	93	36	34	1	10	0	10	1	1
Total	297	116	137	8	10	1	22	2	1

=== Results by division ===
Division	Seats	IND	PML(N)	PML(Q)	PPP	IPP	IND	Others	Election Postponed
Rawalpindi	24	11	13	0	0	0	0	0	0
Gujrat	17	5	5	7	0	0	0	0	0
Gujranwala	27	6	18	0	0	0	2	1	0
Sargodha	14	5	9	0	0	0	0	0	0
Mianwali	11	5	2	0	0	0	4	0	0
Faisalabad	38	29	6	0	0	0	3	0	0
Lahore	53	17	33	0	0	1	2	0	0
Sahiwal	20	2	17	0	0	0	1	0	0
Multan	32	12	13	0	4	0	3	0	0
Bahawalpur	31	10	9	1	5	0	4	1	1
Dera Ghazi Khan	30	14	12	0	1	0	3	0	0
Total	297	116	137	8	10	1	22	2	1

=== Results by district ===
Division	District	Seats	IND	PML(N)	PML(Q)	PPP	IPP	IND	Others	Election Postponed
Rawalpindi	Attock	5	3	2	0	0	0	0	0	0
Rawalpindi	Murree	1	0	1	0	0	0	0	0	0
Rawalpindi	Rawalpindi	13	5	8	0	0	0	0	0	0
Rawalpindi	Chakwal	2	0	2	0	0	0	0	0	0
Rawalpindi	Jhelum	3	3	0	0	0	0	0	0	0
Gujrat	Gujrat	8	1	0	7	0	0	0	0	0
Gujrat	Wazirabad	2	1	1	0	0	0	0	0	0
Gujrat	Hafizabad	3	1	2	0	0	0	0	0	0
Gujrat	Mandi Bahauddin	4	2	2	0	0	0	0	0	0
Gujranwala	Sialkot	10	0	8	0	0	0	2	0	0
Gujranwala	Narowal	5	0	4	0	0	0	0	1	0
Gujranwala	Gujranwala	12	6	6	0	0	0	0	0	0
Sargodha	Sargodha	10	3	7	0	0	0	0	0	0
Sargodha	Khushab	4	2	2	0	0	0	0	0	0
Mianwali	Talagang	2	0	2	0	0	0	0	0	0
Mianwali	Mianwali	4	4	0	0	0	0	0	0	0
Mianwali	Bhakkar	5	1	0	0	0	0	4	0	0
Faisalabad	Chiniot	4	0	1	0	0	0	3	0	0
Faisalabad	Faisalabad	21	17	4	0	0	0	0	0	0
Faisalabad	Toba Tek Singh	6	5	1	0	0	0	0	0	0
Faisalabad	Jhang	7	7	0	0	0	0	0	0	0
Lahore	Nankana Sahib	4	1	2	0	0	0	1	0	0
Lahore	Sheikhupura	9	6	3	0	0	0	0	0	0
Lahore	Lahore	30	8	21	0	0	1	0	0	0
Lahore	Kasur	10	2	7	0	0	0	1	0	0
Sahiwal	Okara	8	0	8	0	0	0	0	0	0
Sahiwal	Pakpattan	5	0	4	0	0	0	1	0	0
Sahiwal	Sahiwal	7	2	5	0	0	0	0	0	0
Multan	Khanewal	8	1	5	0	0	0	2	0	0
Multan	Multan	12	5	3	0	4	0	0	0	0
Multan	Lodhran	4	2	1	0	0	0	1	0	0
Multan	Vehari	8	4	4	0	0	0	0	0	0
Bahawalpur	Bahawalnagar	8	3	2	0	0	0	2	1	0
Bahawalpur	Bahawalpur	10	1	6	1	1	0	1	0	0
Bahawalpur	Rahim Yar Khan	13	6	1	0	4	0	1	0	1
Dera Ghazi Khan	Muzaffargarh	8	3	4	0	1	0	0	0	0
Dera Ghazi Khan	Kot Addu	3	3	0	0	0	0	0	0	0
Dera Ghazi Khan	Layyah	5	5	0	0	0	0	0	0	0
Dera Ghazi Khan	Taunsa	2	2	0	0	0	0	0	0	0
Dera Ghazi Khan	Dera Ghazi Khan	6	0	4	0	0	0	2	0	0
Dera Ghazi Khan	Rajanpur	6	1	4	0	0	0	1	0	0
Total		297	116	137	8	10	1	22	2	1

District	Constituency		Winner				Runner Up				Margin
District	No.	Name	Candidate	Party	Votes	%	Candidate	Party	Votes	%	Margin
Attock	PP-1	Attock-I	Qazi Ahmed Akbar	PTI	49,285	39.84	Jahangir Khanzada	PML(N)	36,477	29.49	12,808
Attock	PP-2	Attock-II	Sardar Mohammad Ali Khan	PTI	36,149	26.34	Iftikhar Ahmed Khan	PML(N)	35,959	26.20	190
Attock	PP-3	Attock-III	Ejaz Hussain Bukhari	PTI	36,999	31.80	Hameed Akbar	PML(N)	32,043	27.54	4,956
Attock	PP-4	Attock-IV	Sher Ali Khan	PML(N)	48,967	28.02	Malik Amanat Khan Rawal	TLP	44,239	25.31	9,288
Attock	PP-5	Attock-V	Malik Aitbar Khan	PML(N)	46,387	29.21	Malik Jamshed Altaf	PTI	43,917	27.66	2,470
Murree	PP-6	Murree	Muhammad Bilal Yamin	PML(N)	66,049	40.77	Zain ul Abideen	PTI	33,847	20.89	32,202
Rawalpindi	PP-7	Rawalpindi-I	Raja Sagheer Ahmed	PML(N)	66,356	37.30	Muhammad Shabbir Awan	PTI	63,042	35.43	3,314
Rawalpindi	PP-8	Rawalpindi-II	Javed Kausar	PTI	47,531	31.61	Khurram Parvez Raja	PPP	40,604	27.00	6,927
Rawalpindi	PP-9	Rawalpindi-III	Raja Shoukat Aziz Bhatti	PML(N)	50,719	28.91	Chaudhary Sarfaraz Ahmad Khan	PPP	43,644	24.88	7,075
Rawalpindi	PP-10	Rawalpindi-IV	Naeem Ejaz	PML(N)	48,759	32.29	Chaudhary Muhammad Ameer Afzal	PTI	34,415	22.79	14,344
Rawalpindi	PP-11	Rawalpindi-V	Imran Ilyas Chaudhry	PML(N)	27,657	44.96	Chaudhry Mohammad Nazir	PTI	16,594	26.97	11,063
Rawalpindi	PP-12	Rawalpindi-VI	Mohsin Ayub Khan	PML(N)	41,276	35.46	Saad Ali Khan	PTI	35,118	30.17	6,158
Rawalpindi	PP-13	Rawalpindi-VII	Malik Fahad Masood	PTI	57,085	50.52	Malik Umar Farooq	PML(N)	24,556	21.73	32,529
Rawalpindi	PP-14	Rawalpindi-VIII	Malik Iftikhar Ahmed	PML(N)	39,558	43.83	Chaudhary Nisar Ali Khan	IND	33,258	36.85	6,300
Rawalpindi	PP-15	Rawalpindi-IX	Malik Mansoor Afsar	PML(N)	62,165	44.18	Ziad Kayani	PTI	54,043	38.41	8,122
Rawalpindi	PP-16	Rawalpindi-X	Zia Ullah Shah	PML(N)	45,929	41.90	Ejaz Khan	PTI	36,403	33.21	9,526
Rawalpindi	PP-17	Rawalpindi-XI	Raja Abdul Hanif	PML(N)	45,668	44.08	Raja Rashid Hafeez	PTI	38,392	37.06	7,276
Rawalpindi	PP-18	Rawalpindi-XII	Asad Abbas	MWM	46,295	46.14	Sajjad Khan	PML(N)	30,640	30.54	15,655
Rawalpindi	PP-19	Rawalpindi-XIII	Muhammad Tanveer Aslam	PTI	43,993	56.04	Haji Parvez Khan	PML(N)	16,768	21.36	27,225
Chakwal	PP-20	Chakwal-I	Sultan Haider Ali Khan	PML(N)	73,940	45.99	Ali Nasir Bhatti	PTI	67,234	41.81	6,706
Chakwal	PP-21	Chakwal-II	Tanveer Aslam Malik	PML(N)	79,274	45.26	Tariq Mehmood Afzal Kalas	PTI	68,513	39.12	10,761
Talagang	PP-22	Chakwal-cum-Talagang	Sardar Ghulam Abbas	PML(N)	61,714	39.80	Hakeem Nisar Ahmed	PTI	54,077	34.86	7,637
Talagang	PP-23	Talagang	Shehryar Malik	PML(N)	70,649	42.17	Sultan Surkhru Awan	PTI	62,302	37.19	8,347
Jhelum	PP-24	Jhelum-I	Syed Riffat Mehmood	PTI	55,068	32.96	Raja Yawar Kamal Khan	IPP	49,810	29.82	5,258
Jhelum	PP-25	Jhelum-II	Yasir Mehmood Qureshi	PTI	67,506	48.70	Chaudhry Nadeem Khadim	PML(N)	40,735	29.39	26,771
Jhelum	PP-26	Jhelum-III	Mushtaq Ahmed	PTI	60,218	38.65	Nasir Mehmood	PML(N)	54,650	35.08	5,568
Gujrat	PP-27	Gujrat-I	Raja Muhammad Aslam Khan	PML(Q)	34,754	30.28	Nouman Ashraf Chuhdary	PTI	30,305	26.41	4,449
Gujrat	PP-28	Gujrat-II	Shahid Raza	PTI	48,271	42.62	Shabbir Ahmed	PML(N)	35,268	31.14	13,003
Gujrat	PP-29	Gujrat-III	Khalid Javed Asghar Ghural	PML(Q)	45,142	32.30	Nwabzada Haider Mehdi	PML(N)	35,096	25.11	10,046
Gujrat	PP-30	Gujrat-IV	Muhammad Abdullah Warraich	PML(Q)	39,037	31.05	Tanveer Ahmed	PTI	28,417	22.60	10,620
Gujrat	PP-31	Gujrat-V	Shafay Hussain	PML(Q)	55,724	46.07	Mudassir Machyana	PTI	51,665	42.72	4,059
Gujrat	PP-32	Gujrat-VI	Chaudhry Salik Hussain	PML(Q)	55,615	53.78	Parvez Elahi	PTI	44,713	43.31	10,902
Gujrat	PP-33	Gujrat-VII	Syed Madad Ali Shah	PML(Q)	35,492	23.79	Nadeem Asghar Qaira	PPP	28,447	19.07	7,045
Gujrat	PP-34	Gujrat-VIII	Chaudhry Ijaz Ahmad	PML(Q)	46,774	36.05	Sumaira Elahi Chuhan	PTI	33,867	26.10	12,907
Wazirabad	PP-35	Wazirabad-I	Waqar Ahmad Cheema	PML(N)	60,975	38.82	Muhammad Yousaf	PTI	59,835	38.09	1,140
Wazirabad	PP-36	Wazirabad-II	Muhammad Ahmed Chattha	PTI	87,549	55.43	Adnan Afzal Chattha	PML(N)	49,228	31.17	38,321
Hafizabad	PP-37	Hafizabad-I	Shahid Hussain Bhatti	PML(N)	59,853	38.27	Chaudhary Asad Ullah	PTI	41,800	26.73	18,053
Hafizabad	PP-38	Hafizabad-II	Zameer Ul Hassan Bhatti	PTI	52,217	35.62	Gulzar Ahmed	PML(N)	50,839	34.68	1,378
Hafizabad	PP-39	Hafizabad-III	Muhammad Aoun Jahangir	PML(N)	41,874	28.57	Qamar Javed Gujjar	PTI	37,037	25.27	4,837
Mandi Bahauddin	PP-40	Mandi Bahauddin-I	Zarnab Sher	PTI	74,514	53.56	Hameeda Waheeduddin	PML(N)	46,149	33.17	28,365
Mandi Bahauddin	PP-41	Mandi Bahauddin-II	Basma Riaz Choudhry	PTI	70,494	44.20	Syed Tariq Yaqoob Rizvi	PML(N)	25,597	16.05	44,897
Mandi Bahauddin	PP-42	Mandi Bahauddin-III	Khalid Mahmood Ranjha	PML(N)	50,506	38.14	Sajid Ahmad Khan	PTI	42,622	32.20	7,983
Mandi Bahauddin	PP-43	Mandi Bahauddin-IV	Chaudhry Akhtar Abbas Bosal	PML(N)	45,636	32.44	Chaudhry Muhammad Nawaz	PTI	37,906	26.94	7,730
Sialkot	PP-44	Sialkot-I	Rana Muhammad Arif Iqbal Harnah	PML(N)	47,137	33.18	Saeed Ahmad Bhalli	PTI	41,250	29.04	5,887
Sialkot	PP-45	Sialkot-II	Tariq Subhani	PML(N)	63,467	45.33	Umar Javaid Ghuman	PTI	52,312	37.36	11,155
Sialkot	PP-46	Sialkot-III	Faisal Akram	PML(N)	55,258	42.05	Rooba Umer	PTI	47,953	36.49	7,305
Sialkot	PP-47	Sialkot-IV	Muhammad Mansha Ullah Butt	PML(N)	50,604	43.38	Mehar Kashif	PTI	44,912	38.50	5,692
Sialkot	PP-48	Sialkot-V	Khurram Khan Virk	IND	46,625	31.39	Rana Liaqat Ali	PML(N)	41,312	27.82	5,313
Sialkot	PP-49	Sialkot-VI	Muhammad Fayyaz	IND	46,776	34.23	Rana Muhammad Afzal	PML(N)	40,330	29.51	6,446
Sialkot	PP-50	Sialkot-VII	Chaudhry Naveed Ashraf	PML(N)	45,635	35.72	Amaan Ullah	PTI	44,037	34.47	1,598
Sialkot	PP-51	Sialkot-VIII	Zeeshan Rafiq	PML(N)	49,286	39.05	Waqas iftkhar	PTI	46,647	36.96	2,639
Sialkot	PP-52	Sialkot-IX	Chaudhry Arshad Javaid Warraich	PML(N)	58,414	42.08	Fakhar Nishat Ghuman	PTI	49,939	35.98	8,475
Sialkot	PP-53	Sialkot-X	Rana Abdul Sattar	PML(N)	59,310	42.62	Malik Jamshed Ghias	PTI	58,365	41.94	765
Narowal	PP-54	Narowal-I	Ahsan Iqbal	PML(N)	33,243	25.91	Awais Qasim Khan	PTI	31,060	24.21	2,183
Narowal	PP-55	Narowal-II	Mehmood Ahmad	TLP	33,494	28.90	Muhammad Akmal Sargala	PML(N)	23,274	20.08	10,220
Narowal	PP-56	Narowal-III	Rana Mannan Khan	PML(N)	48,920	41.26	Aleem Tariq	PTI	35,678	30.09	13,242
Narowal	PP-57	Narowal-IV	Khawaja Muhammad Waseem	PML(N)	52,691	42.01	Rana Lal Badshah	PTI	26,972	21.51	25,719
Narowal	PP-58	Narowal-V	Bilal Akbar Khan	PML(N)	55,461	43.76	Muhammad Irfan Abid	PTI	45,909	36.22	9,552
Gujranwala	PP-59	Gujranwala-I	Muhammad Nasir Cheema	PTI	37,478	43.02	Bilal Farooq Tarar	PML(N)	32,570	37.39	4,908
Gujranwala	PP-60	Gujranwala-II	Kaleem Ullah Khan	PTI	36,746	43.07	Moazam Rauf Mughal	PML(N)	29,923	35.07	6,823
Gujranwala	PP-61	Gujranwala-III	Imran Khalid Butt	PML(N)	35,559	36.44	Rizwan Ullah Butt	PTI	30,111	30.85	5,448
Gujranwala	PP-62	Gujranwala-IV	Muhammad Nawaz Chohan	PML(N)	30,596	37.28	Rizwan Mustafa Sian	PTI	26,087	31.79	4,509
Gujranwala	PP-63	Gujranwala-V	Chaudhry Muhammad Tariq	PTI	51,181	45.34	Muhammad Toufeeq Butt	PML(N)	43,693	38.71	7,488
Gujranwala	PP-64	Gujranwala-VI	Umar Farooq Dar	PML(N)	37,115	39.76	Chaudhry Muhammad Ali	PTI	33,374	35.75	3,741
Gujranwala	PP-65	Gujranwala-VII	Hassan Ali Iqbal Buttar	PTI	36,499	37.91	Chaudhary Waqar Ahmad Cheema	IND	29,042	30.16	7,457
Gujranwala	PP-66	Gujranwala-VIII	Qaiser Iqbal	PML(N)	48,439	37.14	Rizwan Zafar Cheema	PTI	44,342	34.00	4,097
Gujranwala	PP-67	Gujranwala-IX	Chaudhry Akhtar Ali Khan	PML(N)	39,834	35.75	Chaudhry Ali Wakeel Khan	PTI	32,762	29.40	7,072
Gujranwala	PP-68	Gujranwala-X	Mian Arqam Khan	PTI	43,615	38.82	Chaudhary Mohammad Iqbal	PML(N)	40,311	35.88	3,304
Gujranwala	PP-69	Gujranwala-XI	Irfan Bashir	PML(N)	47,902	37.43	Umar Javaid Virk	PTI	43,165	33.73	4,737
Gujranwala	PP-70	Gujranwala-XII	Tashakul Abbas Warraich	PTI	37,709	36.70	Aman Ullah Warraich	PML(N)	28,874	28.10	8,835
Sargodha	PP-71	Sargodha-I	Sohaib Ahmad Malik	PML(N)	55,292	39.51	Naeem Haider Panjhuta	PTI	49,161	35.13	6,131
Sargodha	PP-72	Sargodha-II	Mansoor Azam	PML(N)	50,545	34.83	Chaudhry Sohail Akhtar	PTI	41,392	28.52	9,153
Sargodha	PP-73	Sargodha-III	Muhammad Ansar Iqbal	PTI	58,242	44.75	Mian Sultan Ali Ranjha	PML(N)	46,514	35.74	11,728
Sargodha	PP-74	Sargodha-IV	Ikram Ul Haq	PML(N)	51,651	38.01	Nadeem Muhammad Akram Cheema	PTI	34,716	25.55	16,935
Sargodha	PP-75	Sargodha-V	Ali Asif Baga	PTI	56,617	44.54	Abdul Razaq	PML(N)	42,940	33.78	13,677
Sargodha	PP-76	Sargodha-VI	Zulfiqar Ali Bhatti	PTI	36,996	33.66	Ghulam Dastagir Lak	PML(N)	32,473	29.55	4,523
Sargodha	PP-77	Sargodha-VII	Safdar Hussain	PML(N)	49,640	38.99	Abdul Wahab Mumtaz Kahloon	PTI	46,651	36.64	2,989
Sargodha	PP-78	Sargodha-VIII	Rana Munawar Hussain	PML(N)	60,569	43.18	Waqar Anwar Sandhu	PTI	57,607	41.06	2,962
Sargodha	PP-79	Sargodha-IX	Taimur Ali Khan	PML(N)	42,499	32.16	Ghulam Ali Asghar Lahri	PTI	35,928	27.18	6,571
Sargodha	PP-80	Sargodha-X	Sardar Muhammad Asim Sher Maken	PML(N)	38,336	29.86	Chaudhary Iftikhar Hussain Gondal	PTI	35,411	27.58	2,925
Khushab	PP-81	Khushab-I	Hasan Aslam Awan	PTI	46,991	36.02	Ameer Haider Sangha	IPP	32,294	24.76	14,697
Khushab	PP-82	Khushab-II	Muhammad Asif Malik	PML(N)	41,577	36.60	Masood Anwar	PTI	39,529	34.79	2,048
Khushab	PP-83	Khushab-III	Ali Hussain Khan	PML(N)	48,083	35.34	Amjad Raza	PTI	39,337	28.91	8,746
Khushab	PP-84	Khushab-IV	Fateh Khaliq	PTI	49,820	42.63	Karam Elahi Bandial	PML(N)	35,005	29.95	14,815
Mianwali	PP-85	Mianwali-I	Muhammad Iqbal	PTI	92,550	65.45	Amanat Ullah Khan	PML(N)	23,984	16.96	68,566
Mianwali	PP-86	Mianwali-II	Amin Ullah Khan	PTI	85,387	59.25	Adil Abdullah Khan	IND	19,832	13.76	65,555
Mianwali	PP-87	Mianwali-III	Malik Ahmad Khan Bhachar	PTI	107,278	70.96	Sajjad Ahmad Malik	IND	15,710	10.39	91,568
Mianwali	PP-88	Mianwali-IV	Mumtaz Ahmad	PTI	67,525	45.27	Malik Muhammad Feroze Joyia	PML(N)	59,306	39.76	8,219
Bhakkar	PP-89	Bhakkar-I	Ameer Muhammad Khan	IND	61,892	51.64	Abdul Majeed Khan	PML(N)	37,325	31.14	24,567
Bhakkar	PP-90	Bhakkar-II	Ahmad Nawaz Khan	IND	43,572	33.40	Irfan Ullah Khan Niazi	PTI	43,301	33.19	271
Bhakkar	PP-91	Bhakkar-III	Ghazanfar Abbas Cheena	IND	62,332	43.21	Saeed Akbar Khan Nawani	IND	61,760	42.82	572
Bhakkar	PP-92	Bhakkar-IV	Amir Inayat Khan Shahani	IND	41,592	33.95	Rafiq Ahmad Khan Niazi	PTI	33,121	27.03	8,471
Bhakkar	PP-93	Bhakkar-V	Amir Inayat Khan Shahani	IND	50,425	35.98	Muhammad Zia Ullah Khan	IND	45,580	32.53	4,845
Chiniot	PP-94	Chiniot-I	Taimoor Ali Lali	IND	47,935	44.30	Imtiaz Ahmad Lali	IND	47,153	43.58	782
Chiniot	PP-95	Chiniot-II	Ilyas Chinioti	PML(N)	36,794	30.10	Shoukat Ali	PTI	29,715	24.31	7,079
Chiniot	PP-96	Chiniot-III	Zulfiqar Ali Shah	IND	52,802	42.05	Syed Hassan Murtaza	PPP	43,255	34.45	9,547
Chiniot	PP-97	Chiniot-IV	Saqib Khan Chadhar	IND	42,976	35.57	Muhammad Saqlain Anwar	PML(N)	37,759	31.25	5,217
Faisalabad	PP-98	Faisalabad-I	Junaid Afzal Sahi	PTI	73,565	47.75	Muhammad Ajmal Cheema	IPP	47,834	31.05	25,731
Faisalabad	PP-99	Faisalabad-II	Ahmad Mujtaba Chaudhry	PTI	56,016	45.67	Muhammad Shoib Idrees	PML(N)	43,400	35.38	12,616
Faisalabad	PP-100	Faisalabad-III	Sardar Khan Bahadur Dogar	PML(N)	44,147	40.17	Chaudhry Umair Wasi Zafar	PTI	38,699	35.21	5,448
Faisalabad	PP-101	Faisalabad-IV	Muhammad Akram Chaudhary	PTI	73,593	47.55	Muhammad Ashraf Chaudhary	PML(N)	50,132	32.39	23,461
Faisalabad	PP-102	Faisalabad-V	Jafar Ali Hocha	PML(N)	30,578	24.84	Shaheer Dawood Butt	PTI	30,030	24.39	548
Faisalabad	PP-103	Faisalabad-VI	Noor Shahid Noor	PTI	35,508	30.00	Muhammad Safdar Shakir	PML(N)	26,913	22.74	8,595
Faisalabad	PP-104	Faisalabad-VII	Arif Mahmood Gill	PML(N)	53,729	36.89	Muhammad Farooq Arshad	PTI	46,483	31.91	7,246
Faisalabad	PP-105	Faisalabad-VIII	Rao Kashif Raheem Khan	PML(N)	58,185	41.81	Adil Pervaiz Gujjar	PTI	56,268	40.43	1,917
Faisalabad	PP-106	Faisalabad-IX	Ahsan Raza	PTI	51,945	44.62	Ali Akhtar	IPP	25,639	22.02	26,306
Faisalabad	PP-107	Faisalabad-X	Javed Niaz Manj	PTI	27,672	20.59	Khalid Pervaz	PML(N)	26,374	19.63	1,298
Faisalabad	PP-108	Faisalabad-XI	Aftab Ahmad Khan	PTI	60,687	44.33	Muhammad Ajmal Asif	PML(N)	56,848	41.53	3,839
Faisalabad	PP-109	Faisalabad-XII	Chaudhry Zafar Iqbal Nagra	PML(N)	54,585	40.84	Hafiz Atta Ullah	PTI	54,251	40.59	334
Faisalabad	PP-110	Faisalabad-XIII	Hassan Zaka	PTI	46,839	47.64	Hamid Rashid	PML(N)	32,031	32.58	14,808
Faisalabad	PP-111	Faisalabad-XIV	Basharat Ali	PTI	45,599	46.28	Faqeer Hussain	PML(N)	36,373	36.92	9,226
Faisalabad	PP-112	Faisalabad-XV	Asad Mehmood	PTI	75,565	54.42	Asrar Ahmad Khan	PML(N)	47,866	34.47	27,699
Faisalabad	PP-113	Faisalabad-XVI	Nadeem Sadiq Dogar	PTI	53,716	47.59	Ali Abbas Khan	PML(N)	38,456	34.07	15,260
Faisalabad	PP-114	Faisalabad-XVII	Chaudhry Latif Nazar Gujjar	PTI	58,564	51.62	Shiekh Muhammad Yousaf	PML(N)	38,811	34.21	19,753
Faisalabad	PP-115	Faisalabad-XVIII	Shahid Javed	PTI	53,271	50.32	Mian Tahir Pervaz	PML(N)	39,375	37.19	13,896
Faisalabad	PP-116	Faisalabad-XIX	Muhammad Ismael	PTI	67,428	51.44	Rana Ahmad Sheheryar Khan	PML(N)	52,517	40.06	14,911
Faisalabad	PP-117	Faisalabad-XX	Rana Abdul Razzaq Khan	PTI	54,181	49.83	Muhammad Rizwan Butt	PML(N)	40,071	36.85	14,110
Faisalabad	PP-118	Faisalabad-XXI	Khayal Ahmad Kastro	PTI	79,360	60.03	Muhammad Razzaq Malik	PML(N)	40,144	30.37	39,216
Toba Tek Singh	PP-119	Toba Tek Singh-I	Asad Zaman	PTI	78,259	52.16	Uqbah Ali	PML(N)	52,762	35.17	25,497
Toba Tek Singh	PP-120	Toba Tek Singh-II	Muhammad Ahsan Ihsan	PTI	56,740	41.94	Fozia Khalid Warraich	PML(N)	24,613	18.19	32,127
Toba Tek Singh	PP-121	Toba Tek Singh-III	Chaudhry Amjad Ali Javed	PML(N)	58,576	39.54	Saeed Ahmad	PTI	58,456	39.46	120
Toba Tek Singh	PP-122	Toba Tek Singh-IV	Sardar Muhammad Ayub Khan	PML(N)	69,538	46.01	Khawar Sher Khan Gadhi	PTI	69,250	45.82	288
Toba Tek Singh	PP-123	Toba Tek Singh-V	Ashifa Riaz Fatyana	PTI	51,785	34.25	Shahid Iqbal	IND	33,270	22.00	18,515
Toba Tek Singh	PP-124	Toba Tek Singh-VI	Syeda Sonia Ali Raza Shah	PTI	62,241	46.97	Syed Qutab Ali Shah	PML(N)	56,248	42.45	5,993
Jhang	PP-125	Jhang-I	Ghulam Ahmed Khan Gadi	PTI	55,756	37.96	Faisal Saleh Hayat	PML(N)	38,489	26.21	17,267
Jhang	PP-126	Jhang-II	Mehar Muhammad Nawaz	PTI	45,408	37.17	Mehar Muhammad Aslam Bharwana	PML(N)	42,842	35.07	2,566
Jhang	PP-127	Jhang-III	Sheikh Muhammad Akram	PTI	50,404	39.61	Masroor Nawaz Jhangvi	IND	40,127	31.53	10,277
Jhang	PP-128	Jhang-IV	Ghazanfar Abbas Shah	PML(N)	62,370	42.42	Khalid Mahmood Sargana	PTI	60,008	40.82	2,362
Jhang	PP-129	Jhang-V	Mian Muhammad Asif Kathia	PTI	37,315	28.22	Chaudhary Khalid Ghani	PML(N)	28,585	21.62	8,730
Jhang	PP-130	Jhang-VI	Rana Shahbaz Ahmad	PTI	67,796	45.41	Ameer Abbas Sial	PML(N)	59,987	40.18	7,809
Jhang	PP-131	Jhang-VII	Mian Muhammad Azam	PTI	73,239	49.43	Faisal Hayat Jabboana	PML(N)	59,578	40.21	13,661
Nankana Sahib	PP-132	Nankana Sahib-I	Sultan Bajwa	IND	47,771	37.11	Mian Ijaz Hussain Bhatti	PML(N)	38,248	29.71	9,523
Nankana Sahib	PP-133	Nankana Sahib-II	Rana Muhammad Arshad	PML(N)	44,323	38.46	Muhammad Atif	PTI	41,632	36.12	2,691
Nankana Sahib	PP-134	Nankana Sahib-III	Mahr Muhammad Kashif	PML(N)	39,504	32.18	Sohail Manzoor Gill	PTI	35,683	29.07	3,821
Nankana Sahib	PP-135	Nankana Sahib-IV	Agha Ali Haidar	PML(N)	56,809	46.64	Jamil Hassan Khan	PTI	43,718	35.89	13,091
Sheikhupura	PP-136	Sheikhupura-I	Hassaan Riaz	PML(N)	52,682	44.86	Umar Aftab Dhillon	PTI	39,021	33.23	13,661
Sheikhupura	PP-137	Sheikhupura-II	Khurram Ijaz Chattha	PTI	58,171	51.33	Muhammad Arshad	PML(N)	38,545	34.01	19,626
Sheikhupura	PP-138	Sheikhupura-III	Pir Muhammad Ashraf Rasool	PML(N)	38,605	44.51	Abuzar Maqsood Chadhar	PTI	33,074	38.14	5,531
Sheikhupura	PP-139	Sheikhupura-IV	Rana Tanveer Hussain	PML(N)	35,659	39.43	Ijaz Hussain Bhatti	PTI	33,685	37.25	1,974
Sheikhupura	PP-140	Sheikhupura-V	Muhammad Awais	PTI	51,380	41.40	Mian Abdul Rauf	PML(N)	44,833	36.12	6,547
Sheikhupura	PP-141	Sheikhupura-VI	Tayyab Rashid	PTI	61,509	49.65	Amjad Latif	PML(N)	38,620	31.17	22,889
Sheikhupura	PP-142	Sheikhupura-VII	Waqas Mahmood Maan	PTI	49,537	39.47	Mahmood Ul Haq	PML(N)	43,100	34.34	6,437
Sheikhupura	PP-143	Sheikhupura-VIII	Khan Sher Akbar Khan	PTI	52,424	39.21	Ishtiaq Ahmad	PML(N)	43,154	32.28	9,270
Sheikhupura	PP-144	Sheikhupura-IX	Muhammad Sarfraz Dogar	PTI	58,413	43.05	Sajjad Haider Nadeem	PML(N)	34,239	25.23	24,174
Lahore	PP-145	Lahore-I	Sami Ullah Khan	PML(N)	42,578	36.80	Yasir Gilani	PTI	38,267	33.07	4,311
Lahore	PP-146	Lahore-II	Ghazali Saleem Butt	PML(N)	30,588	36.40	Junaid Razzaq	PTI	28,516	33.93	2,072
Lahore	PP-147	Lahore-III	Hamza Shahbaz	PML(N)	51,838	41.30	muhammad khan madni	PTI	46,494	37.04	5,344
Lahore	PP-148	Lahore-IV	Mian Mujtaba Shuja-ur-Rehman	PML(N)	38,000	40.34	Saba Dewan	PTI	31,562	33.50	6,438
Lahore	PP-149	Lahore-V	Aleem Khan	IPP	51,756	38.78	Zeeshan Rasheed	PTI	47,998	35.92	3,758
Lahore	PP-150	Lahore-VI	Khawaja Imran Nazir	PML(N)	34,957	39.85	Abdul Karim Khan	PTI	30,318	34.56	4,639
Lahore	PP-151	Lahore-VII	Sohail Shaukat Butt	PML(N)	38,236	55.02	Hammad Ali	PTI	15,844	22.80	22,392
Lahore	PP-152	Lahore-VIII	Malik Muhammad Waheed	PML(N)	34,664	37.41	Nouman Majeed	PTI	29,681	32.03	4,983
Lahore	PP-153	Lahore-IX	Khawaja Salman Rafique	PML(N)	35,233	41.05	Mian Awais Anjum	PTI	33,029	38.48	2,204
Lahore	PP-154	Lahore-X	Malik Ghulam Habib Awan	PML(N)	26,015	31.64	Shakeel Ahmad Sindhu	PTI	24,167	29.39	1,848
Lahore	PP-155	Lahore-XI	Imtiaz Mehmood	PTI	36,731	41.98	Naeem Shahzad	PML(N)	30,898	35.32	5,833
Lahore	PP-156	Lahore-XII	Ali Imtiaz	PTI	54,037	53.51	Chaudhry Yasin Sohal	PML(N)	35,114	34.77	18,923
Lahore	PP-157	Lahore-XIII	Hafiz Farhat Abbas	PTI	45,037	51.05	Naseer Ahmad	PML(N)	27,039	30.65	17,998
Lahore	PP-158	Lahore-XIV	Shehbaz Sharif	PML(N)	38,642	45.43	Yousaf Ali	PTI	23,847	28.03	14,795
Lahore	PP-159	Lahore-XV	Maryam Nawaz	PML(N)	23,604	38.63	Mehar Sharafat Ali	PTI	21,498	35.18	2,106
Lahore	PP-160	Lahore-XVI	Malik Asad Ali Khokhar	PML(N)	26,781	40.05	Azam Khan Niazi	PTI	21,249	31.78	5,532
Lahore	PP-161	Lahore-XVII	Farrukh Javaid	PTI	46,947	48.78	Omer Sohail	PML(N)	28,855	29.98	18,092
Lahore	PP-162	Lahore-XVIII	Shahbaz Ali Khokhar	PML(N)	43,427	43.82	Shabir Ahmad	PTI	40,508	40.88	2,919
Lahore	PP-163	Lahore-XIX	Imran Javed	PML(N)	23,141	33.31	Azeem Ullah Khan	PTI	21,808	31.39	1,333
Lahore	PP-164	Lahore-XX	Shehbaz Sharif	PML(N)	27,099	39.41	Yusaf mayo	PTI	25,919	37.69	1,180
Lahore	PP-165	Lahore-XXI	Ahmer Rasheed Bhatti	PTI	29,390	37.97	Shahzad Nazir	PML(N)	28,427	36.73	963
Lahore	PP-166	Lahore-XXII	Muhammad Anas Mehmood	PML(N)	32,270	36.73	Khalid Mehmood Gujjar	PTI	30,611	34.84	1,659
Lahore	PP-167	Lahore-XXIII	Irfan Shafi Khokhar	PML(N)	23,248	40.68	Ammar Bashir Gujjar	PTI	21,182	37.07	2,066
Lahore	PP-168	Lahore-XXIV	Faisal Ayub Khokhar	PML(N)	32,730	44.83	Malik Nadeem Abbas	PTI	27,590	37.79	5,140
Lahore	PP-169	Lahore-XXV	Malik Khalid Pervaz Khokhar	PML(N)	85,030	51.41	Mehmood-ur-Rasheed	PTI	62,718	37.92	22,312
Lahore	PP-170	Lahore-XXVI	Mian Muhammad Haroon Akbar	PTI	64,143	52.17	Rana Ahsan	PML(N)	40,661	33.07	23,482
Lahore	PP-171	Lahore-XXVII	Mian Aslam Iqbal	PTI	61,862	52.40	Mehr Ishtiaq Ahmed	PML(N)	36,955	31.30	24,907
Lahore	PP-172	Lahore-XXVIII	Misbah Wajid	PTI	31,379	39.66	Rana Mashood Ahmad Khan	PML(N)	28,649	36.21	2,730
Lahore	PP-173	Lahore-XXIX	Mian Marghoob Ahmad	PML(N)	63,238	45.45	Muhammad Zubair Khan Niazi	PTI	49,522	35.59	13,716
Lahore	PP-174	Lahore-XXX	Bilal Yasin	PML(N)	36,265	41.30	Chaudhary Muhammad Asghar	PTI	33,957	38.67	2,308
Kasur	PP-175	Kasur-I	Rashid Tufail	PTI	44,933	36.27	Malik Rasheed Ahmad Khan	PML(N)	38,245	30.87	6,688
Kasur	PP-176	Kasur-II	Muhammad Ilyas Khan	PML(N)	48,333	44.42	Muzammil Masood Bhatti	PTI	19,238	17.68	29,095
Kasur	PP-177	Kasur-III	Muhammad Naeem Safdar Ansari	PML(N)	45,634	33.83	Muhammad Saleem Mahar	PTI	32,033	23.75	13,601
Kasur	PP-178	Kasur-IV	Malik Ahmad Saeed Khan	PML(N)	54,942	42.45	Barrister Shahid Masood	PTI	49,127	37.96	5,815
Kasur	PP-179	Kasur-V	Malik Ahmad Khan	PML(N)	65,623	52.38	Sardar Nadir Farooq Ali	PTI	47,665	38.05	17,958
Kasur	PP-180	Kasur-VI	Ahsan Raza Khan	IND	34,756	28.96	Waqas Hassan Mokal	PTI	21,787	18.15	12,969
Kasur	PP-181	Kasur-VII	Mian Humble Sana Kareemi	PTI	49,505	41.50	Sheikh Alla Ud din	PML(N)	35,929	30.12	13,576
Kasur	PP-182	Kasur-VIII	Mehmood Anwar	PML(N)	32,352	25.96	Akeel Aslam Arain	PTI	31,447	25.23	905
Kasur	PP-183	Kasur-IX	Rana Sikandar Hayat	PML(N)	52,297	43.05	Sardar Asif Nakai	IND	39,804	32.76	12,493
Kasur	PP-184	Kasur-X	Rana Muhammad Iqbal Khan	PML(N)	44,378	39.09	Rana Muhammad Aslam Khan	PTI	29,697	26.16	14,681
Okara	PP-185	Okara-I	Javaid Alla-ud-Din Sajid	PML(N)	52,341	33.46	Mehar Muhammad Javed	PTI	46,826	29.94	5,515
Okara	PP-186	Okara-II	Ashiq Husain Khan	PML(N)	43,255	31.80	Syed Gulzar Husnain	PTI	32,231	23.70	11,024
Okara	PP-187	Okara-III	Chaudry Iftikhar Hussain Chachar	PML(N)	60,707	44.30	Mian Muhammad Fiaz Qasim Wattoo	PTI	37,369	27.27	23,338
Okara	PP-188	Okara-IV	Noor Ul Amin Wattoo	PML(N)	56,694	41.29	Mozzam Jehanzeb Wattoo	IND	37,942	27.64	18,752
Okara	PP-189	Okara-V	Malik Ali Abbas Khokhar	PML(N)	40,499	31.63	Chaudhry Tariq Irshad Khan	PTI	38,331	29.93	2,168
Okara	PP-190	Okara-VI	Mian Yawar Zaman	PML(N)	63,911	46.31	Mehar Abdul Sattar	PTI	52,649	38.15	11,262
Okara	PP-191	Okara-VII	Mian Muhammad Munir	PML(N)	46,256	34.89	Muhammad Saleem Sadiq	PTI	44,995	33.94	1,261
Okara	PP-192	Okara-VIII	Ghulam Raza	PML(N)	64,220	43.62	Rai Hammad Aslam Kharal	PTI	57,373	38.97	6,847
Pakpattan	PP-193	Pakpattan-I	Farooq Ahmad Khan Maneka	PML(N)	40,172	33.59	Mian Muhammad Hayat Maneka	IND	38,218	31.95	1,954
Pakpattan	PP-194	Pakpattan-II	Chaudhry Javed Ahmad	PML(N)	38,624	31.67	Naveed Ali	PTI	29,822	24.45	8,802
Pakpattan	PP-195	Pakpattan-III	Imran Akram	IND	51,179	38.72	Kashif Ali Chishty	PML(N)	37,474	28.35	13,705
Pakpattan	PP-196	Pakpattan-IV	Farrukh Javed	PML(N)	55,513	40.82	Muhammad Naeem Ibrahim	PTI	54,682	40.21	831
Pakpattan	PP-197	Pakpattan-V	Sardar Mansab Ali Dogar	PML(N)	48,955	37.77	Tariq Qayyum Shah	PTI	46,760	36.07	2,195
Sahiwal	PP-198	Sahiwal-I	Walayat Shah Khagga	PML(N)	46,137	33.71	Sajjad Nasir	PTI	39,224	28.66	6,913
Sahiwal	PP-199	Sahiwal-II	Qasim Nadeem	PML(N)	46,262	41.43	Ahmad Safdar Khan	PTI	43,138	38.63	3,124
Sahiwal	PP-200	Sahiwal-III	Mohammad Arshad Malik	PML(N)	48,657	40.14	Ahmed Ali	PTI	37,695	31.10	10,962
Sahiwal	PP-201	Sahiwal-IV	Naveed Aslam Khan Lodhi	PML(N)	40,888	33.32	Muhammad Yar	PTI	39,445	32.14	1,443
Sahiwal	PP-202	Sahiwal-V	Rana Riaz Ahmad	PML(N)	40,477	28.23	Haji Waheed Asghar Dogar	PTI	40,073	27.95	404
Sahiwal	PP-203	Sahiwal-VI	Rai Muhammad Murtaza Iqbal	PTI	55,978	43.43	Muhammad Hanif	PML(N)	35,509	27.55	20,469
Sahiwal	PP-204	Sahiwal-VII	Muhammad Ghulam Sarwar	PTI	60,438	42.86	Adil Saeed Chaudhry	IND	33,722	23.91	26,716
Khanewal	PP-205	Khanewal-I	Muhammad Akbar Hayat Hiraj	IND	63,154	45.26	Syed Khawar Ali Shah	IND	40,725	29.18	22,429
Khanewal	PP-206	Khanewal-II	Chaudhary Usama Fazal	PML(N)	46,806	36.57	Sardar Ahmed Yar Hiraj	PTI	39,130	30.57	7,676
Khanewal	PP-207	Khanewal-III	Amir Hayat Hiraj	PML(N)	60,418	42.03	Syed Abbas Ali Shah	PTI	58,840	40.93	1,578
Khanewal	PP-208	Khanewal-IV	Babar Hussain Abid	PML(N)	48,539	37.28	Muhammad Jamshaid Shoukat	PTI	46,311	35.57	2,228
Khanewal	PP-209	Khanewal-V	Chaudhry Zia Ur Rehman	PML(N)	55,579	39.17	Humayun Khan	PTI	38,234	26.95	17,345
Khanewal	PP-210	Khanewal-VI	Khalid Javed	PTI	54,680	39.82	Atta Ur Rehman	PML(N)	47,343	34.48	7,337
Khanewal	PP-211	Khanewal-VII	Rana Muhammad Saleem	PML(N)	53,599	47.05	Imran Pervaiz	PTI	35,194	30.89	18,405
Khanewal	PP-212	Khanewal-VIII	Asghar Hayat	IND	42,347	33.58	Hussain Jahania Gardezi	IND	38,112	30.22	4,235
Multan	PP-213	Multan-I	Ali Haider Gillani	PPP	42,407	35.23	Haris Javed	PTI	33,350	27.70	9,057
Multan	PP-214	Multan-II	Nawabzada Waseem Khan Badozai	PTI	44,946	41.93	Mian Shahzad Maqbool Bhutta	PML(N)	26,013	24.27	18,933
Multan	PP-215	Multan-III	Muhammad Moeen Ud Din Riaz	PTI	67,064	56.09	Shahid Mahmood Khan	PML(N)	29,177	24.40	37,887
Multan	PP-216	Multan-IV	Muhammad Adnan Dogar	PTI	59,289	52.72	Babar Hussain	PML(N)	28,290	25.15	30,999
Multan	PP-217	Multan-V	Muhammad Nadeem Qureshi	PTI	62,213	48.41	Sheikh Muhammad Tariq Rasheed	PML(N)	32,091	24.97	30,122
Multan	PP-218	Multan-VI	Muhammad Salman Naeem	PML(N)	45,930	40.65	Rai Zahoor Ahmad	PTI	41,638	36.85	4,292
Multan	PP-219	Multan-VII	Malik Wasif Mazhar Raan	PPP	43,189	33.64	Muhammad Akhtar	PML(N)	39,496	30.76	3,693
Multan	PP-220	Multan-VIII	Muhammad Iqbal	PPP	42,433	35.08	Rai Mansab Ali Khan	PML(N)	33,273	27.51	9,160
Multan	PP-221	Multan-IX	Mian Kamran Muhammad Abdullah	PPP	43,148	31.73	Makhdoom Syed Amir Abbas	PTI	32,895	24.19	10,253
Multan	PP-222	Multan-X	Ayaz Ahmed	PTI	30,523	23.92	Rana Tahir Shabbir	PPP	28,616	22.43	1,907
Multan	PP-223	Multan-XI	Muhammad Nazik Kareem	PML(N)	36,505	25.37	Shazia Nargis	PTI	28,900	20.08	7,605
Multan	PP-224	Multan-XII	Malik Lal Muhammad	PML(N)	44,301	34.53	Muhammad Abbas Bokhari	PTI	28,485	22.20	15,816
Lodhran	PP-225	Lodhran-I	Shazia Hayyat	PTI	69,799	45.86	Zawar Hussain Warraich	PML(N)	62,698	41.20	7,101
Lodhran	PP-226	Lodhran-II	Razi Ullah Khan	PTI	65,434	44.05	Shah Muhammad	PML(N)	60,133	40.48	5,301
Lodhran	PP-227	Lodhran-III	Muhammad Zubair Khan Baloch	PML(N)	55,324	42.71	Nawab Aman Ullah Khan	PTI	36,736	28.36	18,588
Lodhran	PP-228	Lodhran-IV	Izzat Javaid Khan	PTI	62,431	39.49	Syed Rafi Uddin	PML(N)	43,439	27.48	18,992
Vehari	PP-229	Vehari-I	Chaudhry Muhammad Yousaf Kaselya	PML(N)	49,883	36.35	Arifa Nazir jatt	PTI	40,884	29.79	8,999
Vehari	PP-230	Vehari-II	Salman Shahid	PTI	44,954	36.86	Mian Irfan Aqeel Daultana	PML(N)	30,770	25.23	14,184
Vehari	PP-231	Vehari-III	Khalid Zubair Nisar	PTI	50,942	43.75	Khalid Mehmood Dogar	PML(N)	40,044	34.39	10,898
Vehari	PP-232	Vehari-IV	Malik Nosher Khan Anjam Lungerial	PML(N)	33,320	26.65	Ali Waqas	JI	26,962	21.57	6,358
Vehari	PP-233	Vehari-V	Mian Muhammad Saqib Khurshid	PML(N)	55,030	41.86	Rai Zahoor Ahmad	PTI	48,542	36.93	6,488
Vehari	PP-234	Vehari-VI	Muhammad Naeem Akhtar Khan Bhabha	PML(N)	42,775	33.13	Salman Ali Bhaba	PTi	24,325	18.84	18,450
Vehari	PP-235	Vehari-VII	Muhammad Jahanzaib Khan Khichi	PTI	50,289	41.17	Mian Khaliq Nawaz	PML(N)	39,585	32.41	10,704
Vehari	PP-236	Vehari-VIII	Muhammad Ali Raza Khan Khakwani	PTI	61,443	43.37	Asif Saeed Manais	PML(N)	54,423	38.41	7,020
Bahawalnagar	PP-237	Bahawalnagar-I	Mian Fida Hussain Wattoo	PML(N)	69,072	49.95	Mian Rashid Mehmood Watto	PTI	52,115	37.69	16,957
Bahawalnagar	PP-238	Bahawalnagar-II	Inam Bari	IND	54,627	43.71	Syed Nazar Mahmood Shah	PML(N)	49,468	39.58	5,159
Bahawalnagar	PP-239	Bahawalnagar-III	Muhammad Atif Aurangzeb	PTI	40,346	34.08	Mian Mumtaz Ahmed	PML(N)	32,382	27.35	7,964
Bahawalnagar	PP-240	Bahawalnagar-IV	Muhammad Sohail Khan Zahid	IND	42,117	34.33	Rana Abdul Rauf	PML(N)	32,525	26.51	9,592
Bahawalnagar	PP-241	Bahawalnagar-V	Chaudhry Ghulam Murtaza	PML(Z)	58,436	42.82	Chaudhry Mazhar Iqbal	PML(N)	35,166	25.77	23,270
Bahawalnagar	PP-242	Bahawalnagar-VI	Kashif Naveed	PTI	52,607	40.33	Muzaffar Iqbal	PML(N)	39,431	30.23	13,176
Bahawalnagar	PP-243	Bahawalnagar-VII	Chaudhry Zahid Akram	PML(N)	48,583	33.48	Khadija Khanum	PTI	46,349	31.94	2,234
Bahawalnagar	PP-244	Bahawalnagar-VIII	Suryia Sultana	PTI	50,725	38.93	Mian Abdul Majeed Jatala	PML(N)	49,470	37.97	755
Bahawalpur	PP-245	Bahawalpur-I	Kazim Ali Pirzada	PML(N)	54,225	43.87	Muhammad Ameer Hamza Khan	PTI	46,608	37.71	7,617
Bahawalpur	PP-246	Bahawalpur-II	Farzana Khalil	PTI	68,749	50.03	Muhammad Afzal Gill	PML(N)	56,736	41.29	12,013
Bahawalpur	PP-247	Bahawalpur-III	Chaudhry Khalid Mehmood Jajja	PML(N)	61,321	39.29	Wali Daad Cheema	PML(Q)	50,809	32.55	10,512
Bahawalpur	PP-248	Bahawalpur-IV	Hassan Askari Sheikh	PML(Q)	53,852	39.52	Saad Masood	PML(N)	48,400	35.52	5,452
Bahawalpur	PP-249	Bahawalpur-V	Sahibzada Muhammad Gazain Abbasi	IND	42,503	38.88	Adnan Farid	PML(N)	35,142	32.15	7,361
Bahawalpur	PP-250	Bahawalpur-VI	Syed Amir Ali Shah	PPP	26,272	25.36	Makhdoom Syed Iftikhar Hassan Gillani	IPP	21,258	20.52	5,014
Bahawalpur	PP-251	Bahawalpur-VII	Malik Khalid Mehmood Babar	PML(N)	43,557	37.33	Sahabzada Muhammad Usman Khan Abbasi	IND	29,43	25.22	14,122
Bahawalpur	PP-252	Bahawalpur-VIII	Mian Muhammad Shoaib Awaisi	PML(N)	41,298	35.15	Shafqt Shaheen	PTI	26,562	22.61	14,736
Bahawalpur	PP-253	Bahawalpur-IX	Zaheer Iqbal	PML(N)	45,613	48.65	Muhammad Asghar	PTI	27,614	29.45	17,999
Bahawalpur	PP-254	Bahawalpur-X	Rana Muhammad Tariq Khan	PML(N)	55,473	50.28	Malik Ahmad Usman Channar	PTI	23,578	21.53	31,715
Rahim Yar Khan	PP-255	Rahim Yar Khan-I	Ghazanfar Ali Khan	PPP	42,996	37.94	Makhdoom Syed Muhammad Masood Aalam	PML(N)	37,613	33.19	5,383
Rahim Yar Khan	PP-256	Rahim Yar Khan-II	Qazi Ahmad Saeed	PPP	28,469	25.12	Muhammad Amir Nawaz Khan	IND	23,921	21.11	4,548
Rahim Yar Khan	PP-257	Rahim Yar Khan-III	Mehmood Ahmad	PML(N)	40,230	36.11	Muhammad Islam Aslam	PPP	27,864	25.01	12,366
Rahim Yar Khan	PP-258	Rahim Yar Khan-IV	Muhammad Ejaz Shafi	PTI	65,963	58.52	Muhammad Arshad Javid	PML(N)	31,804	28.21	34,159
Rahim Yar Khan	PP-259	Rahim Yar Khan-V	Faisal Jamil	PTI	53,019	44.50	Mian Shafi Muhammad	IND	20,824	17.48	32,195
Rahim Yar Khan	PP-260	Rahim Yar Khan-VI	Saima Kanwal	PTI	54,986	50.50	Hashim Jawan Bakht	IPP	20,824	19.13	34,162
Rahim Yar Khan	PP-261	Rahim Yar Khan-VII	Jam Aman Ullah	PTI	42,434	36.28	Makhdoom Muhammad Irtaza	PPP	23,638	20.21	18,796
Rahim Yar Khan	PP-262	Rahim Yar Khan-VIII	Chaudhry Asif Majeed	PTI	54,789	52.86	Muhammad Omer Jaffar	PML(N)	25,200	24.31	29,589
Rahim Yar Khan	PP-263	Rahim Yar Khan-IX	Chaudhary Naeem Shafiq	PTI	61,402	50.42	Mahmood ul Hassan	PML(N)	46,220	37.96	15,182
Rahim Yar Khan	PP-264	Rahim Yar Khan-X	Sardar Habib Ur Rehman Khan	PPP	44,288	39.16	Abdul Momin	PTI	31,920	28.23	12,368
Rahim Yar Khan	PP-265	Rahim Yar Khan-XI	Sajjad Ahmad	PTI	52,817	43.16	Chaudhary Muhammad Shafiq Anwar	PML(N)	42,017	34.33	10,800
Rahim Yar Khan	PP-266	Rahim Yar Khan-XII	Elections postponed								
Rahim Yar Khan	PP-267	Rahim Yar Khan-XIII	Rais Nabeel Ahmad	PPP	46,483	43.08	Raees Muhammad Hamza	PTI	26,785	24.83	19,698
Muzaffargarh	PP-268	Muzaffargarh-I	Muhammad Ajmal Khan Chandia	PML(N)	27,914	21.85	Muhammad Younas	PTI	26,562	20.79	1,352
Muzaffargarh	PP-269	Muzaffargarh-II	Mian Alamdar Abbas Qureshi	PPP	34,620	26.72	Muhammad Iqbal Khan Pattafi	IND	33,112	25.55	1,508
Muzaffargarh	PP-270	Muzaffargarh-III	Zahid Ismail Bhutta	PTI	28,439	24.97	Mian Imtiaz Aleem Qureshi	PML(N)	24,427	21.45	4,012
Muzaffargarh	PP-271	Muzaffargarh-IV	Muhammad Aoon Hamid	PML(N)	29,206	25.86	Mian Muhammad Imran	PTI	27,434	24.29	1,772
Muzaffargarh	PP-272	Muzaffargarh-V	Rana Abdul Manan Sajid	PTI	33,474	32.48	Syed Basit Sultan Bukhari	PML(N)	29,988	29.10	3,486
Muzaffargarh	PP-273	Muzaffargarh-VI	Daud Khan Jatoi	PTI	54,907	45.41	Sardar Chunnu Khan Leghari	PML(N)	38,638	31.95	16,269
Muzaffargarh	PP-274	Muzaffargarh-VII	Syed Muhammad Sibtain Raza	PML(N)	44,818	42.08	Shahzad Rasool Khan	PTI	37,836	35.53	6,982
Muzaffargarh	PP-275	Muzaffargarh-VIII	Nawab Khan Gopang	PML(N)	58,278	49.39	Amna Qaim	PTI	42,347	39.08	12,165
Kot Addu	PP-276	Kot Addu-I	Rana Aurangzaib	PTI	47,225	34.87	Amjad Pervaz	PML(N)	37,760	27.88	9,465
Kot Addu	PP-277	Kot Addu-II	Nadia Khar	PTI	56,354	42.16	Muhammad Zeeshan Gurmani	IND	47,363	35.44	8,991
Kot Addu	PP-278	Kot Addu-III	Muhammad Ahsan Ali	PTI	60,519	41.61	Malik Ahmad Yar Hunjra	PML(N)	53,312	36.66	7,207
Layyah	PP-279	Layyah-I	Muhammad Athar Maqbool	PTI	54,483	41.29	Malik Ahmed Ali Ohlak	PML(N)	51,760	39.22	2,723
Layyah	PP-280	Layyah-II	Sardar Shahab-ud-Din Khan	PTI	39,087	29.65	Malik Abdul Shakoor Siwag	PML(N)	26,971	20.46	12,116
Layyah	PP-281	Layyah-III	Shoaib Ameer	PTI	38,721	31.73	Muhammad Tahir	PML(N)	35,432	29.03	3,289
Layyah	PP-282	Layyah-IV	Usama Asghar Ali Gujjar	PTI	53,960	41.51	Malik Hashim Hussain Sahu	IND	27,395	21.07	26,565
Layyah	PP-283	Layyah-V	Ghulam Asghar Khan	PTI	57,086	42.01	Mahar Ijaz Ahmad Achlana	PML(N)	52,306	38.50	4,780
Taunsa	PP-284	Taunsa-I	Muhammad Tahir	PTI	52,620	35.47	Sardar Mir Badshah Qaisrani	PML(N)	48,883	32.95	3,737
Taunsa	PP-285	Taunsa-II	Khawaja Salah Ud Din Akbar	PTI	31,871	27.64	Sardar Muhammad Akram Khan	PPP	26,428	22.92	5,443
Dera Ghazi Khan	PP-286	Dera Ghazi Khan-I	Salah Ud Din Khan	PML(N)	37,689	37.96	Farhat Abbas Balouch	PTI	35,740	36.00	1,949
Dera Ghazi Khan	PP-287	Dera Ghazi Khan-II	Usama Leghari	PML(N)	60,136	45.21	Akhlaq Ahmad	PTI	59,107	44.44	1,029
Dera Ghazi Khan	PP-288	Dera Ghazi Khan-III	Hanif Khan Pitafi	IND	43,486	39.06	Malik Muhammad Iqbal Saqib	PTI	39,778	35.73	3,708
Dera Ghazi Khan	PP-289	Dera Ghazi Khan-IV	Mehmood Qadir Khan	IND	32,728	39.14	Ahmad Ali Khan Dreshak	PTI	30,503	36.48	2,225
Dera Ghazi Khan	PP-290	Dera Ghazi Khan-V	Awais Leghari	PML(N)	43,133	41.41	Sardar Muhammad Mohiuddin Khosa	PTI	41,906	40.23	1,385
Dera Ghazi Khan	PP-291	Dera Ghazi Khan-VI	Muhammad Ahmad Khan Leghari	PML(N)	38,646	43.36	Muhammad Faheem Saeed	PTI	37,271	41.82	1,375
Rajanpur	PP-292	Rajanpur-I	Sardar Sher Afgan Gorchani	PML(N)	38,923	42.64	Ahmad Nawaz Gulfaaar	PTI	24,364	26.69	14,559
Rajanpur	PP-293	Rajanpur-II	Sardar Sher Ali Gorchani	PML(N)	38,454	39.91	Mirza Muhammad Shahzad Hamayun	PTI	35,151	36.48	3,303
Rajanpur	PP-294	Rajanpur-III	Sardar Pervaz Iqbal Gorchani	PML(N)	43,656	48.38	Atif Ali Khan Dareshak	PTI	30,530	33.83	13,126
Rajanpur	PP-295	Rajanpur-IV	Abdul Aziz Khan Dreshak	PML(N)	37,922	41.84	Sardar Farooq Amanullah Dreshak	PTI	31,685	34.96	6,237
Rajanpur	PP-296	Rajanpur-V	Awais Dareshak	PTI	42,772	43.83	Sardar Muhammad Yousaf Dreshak	PML(N)	41,701	42.73	1,071
Rajanpur	PP-297	Rajanpur-VI	Khizer Hussain Mazari	IND	39,532	44.64	Dost Muhammad Mazari	PML(N)	31,731	35.83	7,801

== See also ==
- 2024 Khyber Pakhtunkhwa provincial election
- 2024 Sindh provincial election
- 2024 Balochistan provincial election
- 2024 Pakistani general election
