= Sajjad Ahmed =

Sajjad Ahmed may refer to:

- Sajjad Ahmed (cricketer, born 1932), Pakistani cricketer
- Sajjad Ahmed (Bangladeshi cricketer) (born 1974)
- Sajjad Ahmed (cricketer, born 1980), Pakistani cricketer
- Sajjad Ahmad, Pakistani politician
