= Amir Inayat Khan Shahani =

Pakistani politician

Member of the Provincial Assembly of the Punjab
- Incumbent
- Assumed office 23 February 2024
- Constituency: PP-92 Bhakkar-IV
- In office 15 August 2018 – 14 January 2023
- Constituency: PP-92 Bhakkar-IV
- In office 29 May 2013 – 31 May 2018
- Constituency: PP-92 Bhakkar-IV

Personal details
- Born: 1 December 1980 (age 45) Bhakkar, Punjab, Pakistan
- Party: IPP (2025-present)
- Other political affiliations: PMLN (2024-2025); IPP (2023-2024); PMLN (2022-2023); PTI (2018-2022); PMLN (2013-2018); IND (2013)

Amir Inayat Khan Shahani is a Pakistani politician and an incumbent Member of the Provincial Assembly of the Punjab since February 2024. He was also a Member of the Provincial Assembly of the Punjab from May 2013 to May 2018 and from August 2018 to January 2023.

== Early life and education ==
He was born on 1 December 1980 in Bhakkar.

He graduated in 2003 from University of the Punjab and has a degree of Bachelor of Arts.

== Political career ==
He was elected to the Provincial Assembly of the Punjab as an independent candidate from PP-50 (Bhakkar-IV) in the 2013 Punjab provincial election. He joined the Pakistan Muslim League (N) (PML-N) in May 2013.

In May 2018, he quit the PML-N and joined Pakistan Tehreek-e-Insaf (PTI).

He was re-elected to the Provincial Assembly of the Punjab as a candidate of the PTI from PP-92 (Bhakkar-IV) in the 2018 Punjab provincial election.

He was re-elected to the Provincial Assembly of the Punjab as a PTI supported Independent candidate from PP-92 (Bhakkar-IV) in the 2024 Punjab provincial election.

He is former Chairman of Punjab Education Foundation.
