= Sultan Bajwa =

Pakistani politician

Member of the Provincial Assembly of the Punjab
- Incumbent
- Assumed office 24 February 2024
- Constituency: PP-132 Nankana Sahib-I

Personal details
- Party: PMLN (2024-present)

Sultan Bajwa is a Pakistani politician who has been a Member of the Provincial Assembly of the Punjab since 2024.

== Early life and education ==
He was born in Nankana Sahib to Chaudhry Tariq Mehmood Bajwa.

He completed his Bachelor's in Computer Science at Brunel University London and a Master of Management at BPP University. In 2021, he earned a Graduate Diploma in Law from Leeds Beckett University and in 2023, he received a Bar at Law degree from Lincoln's Inn.

== Political career ==
He was elected to the Provincial Assembly of the Punjab as an independent candidate from constituency PP-132 Nankana Sahib-I in the 2024 Pakistani general election. He received 47,743 votes and defeated Mian Ijaz Hussain Bhatti a candidate of Pakistan Muslim League (N) (PML-N) who secured 38,248 votes.

Following the election, he joined PML-N.
