= Sardar Mohammad Ali Khan =

Pakistani politician

Member of the Provincial Assembly of the Punjab
- Incumbent
- Assumed office 24 February 2024
- Constituency: PP-2 Attock-II

Personal details
- Party: PTI (2024-present)

Sardar Mohammad Ali Khan is a Pakistani politician who has been a Member of the Provincial Assembly of the Punjab since 24 February 2024.

== Political career ==
He was elected to the Provincial Assembly of the Punjab as a Pakistan Tehreek-e-Insaf-backed independent candidate from constituency PP-2 Attock-II in the 2024 Punjab provincial election. Following this, he declared his affiliation under the PTI alongside other PTI members.
