= Qazi Ahmed Akbar =

Pakistani politician

Member of the Provincial Assembly of the Punjab
- Incumbent
- Assumed office 24 February 2024
- Constituency: PP-1 Attock-I

Personal details
- Born: 8 February 1980 (age 46)
- Party: PTI (2018-present)

Qazi Ahmed Akbar is a Pakistani politician and agriculturalist who has been a Member of the Provincial Assembly of the Punjab since 24 February 2024.

== Political career ==
He was elected to the Provincial Assembly of the Punjab as a Pakistan Tehreek-e-Insaf-backed Independent candidate from the constituency PP-1 Attock-I in the 2024 Punjab provincial election. Following this, he declared his affiliation under the Sunni Ittehad Council (SIC) alongside other PTI members.
