= Chaudhary Naeem Shafiq =

Pakistani politician

- چوہدری نعیم شفیق

Member of the Provincial Assembly of the Punjab
- Incumbent
- Assumed office 24 February 2024
- Constituency: PP-263 Rahim Yar Khan-IX

Personal details
- Party: PTI (2024-present)

Chaudhary Muhammad Naeem Shafiq (Urdu: چوہدری محمد نعیم شفیق) is a Pakistani politician who is a member of the Provincial Assembly of the Punjab since February 2024.

== Political career ==
Shafiq won the 2024 Punjab provincial election from PP-263 Rahim Yar Khan-IX as an independent candidate. He received 61,401 votes while runner up candidate Mahmood ul Hassan of Pakistan Muslim League (N) received 46,220 votes.
