= Zarnab Sher =

Pakistani politician

Member of the Provincial Assembly of Punjab
- Incumbent
- Assumed office 24 February 2024

Personal details
- Political party: PTI (2024-present)

Zarnab Sher is a Pakistani politician who has been a Member of the Provincial Assembly of the Punjab since 2024.

== Political career ==
She was elected to the Provincial Assembly of the Punjab as a Pakistan Tehreek-e-Insaf-backed independent candidate from Constituency PP-40 Mandi Bahauddin-I in the 2024 Pakistani general election.
