= Muhammad Naeem Safdar Ansari =

Pakistani politician

Member of the Provincial Assembly of the Punjab
- In office 15 August 2018 – 14 January 2023
- Constituency: PP-174 Kasur-I
- In office 2008 – 31 May 2018

Personal details
- Born: 26 January 1982 (age 44) Kasur, Punjab, Pakistan
- Party: PMLN

Muhammad Naeem Safdar Ansari is a Pakistani politician who was a Member of the Provincial Assembly of the Punjab, from 2008 to May 2018 and from August 2018 to January 2023.

== Early life and education ==
He was born on 26 January 1982 in Lahore.

He graduated from University of the Punjab and has the degree of Bachelor of Arts.

== Political career ==
He was elected to the Provincial Assembly of the Punjab as a candidate of Pakistan Muslim League (N) (PML-N) from Constituency PP-177 (Kasur-III) in the 2008 Pakistani general election. He received 30,677 votes and defeated a candidate of Pakistan Peoples Party.

He was re-elected to the Provincial Assembly of the Punjab as a candidate of PML-N from Constituency PP-177 (Kasur-III) in the 2013 Pakistani general election.

He was re-elected to Provincial Assembly of the Punjab as a candidate of PML-N from Constituency PP-174 (Kasur-I) in the 2018 Pakistani general election.
