= Raja Abdul Hanif =

Pakistani politician

Member of the Provincial Assembly of the Punjab
- In office 2008 – 31 May 2018

Personal details
- Born: 1 February 1971 (age 55) Rawalpindi, Punjab, Pakistan
- Party: PMLN (2008-present)

Malik Jalil Awan is a Pakistani politician who is a Member of the Pakistan Muslim League from 2013.

== Early life and education ==
He was born on 1 February 1971 in Rawalpindi.

He has a degree of Bachelor of Laws which he obtained in 2000 from Punjab Law College.

== Political career ==
He was elected to the Provincial Assembly of the Punjab as a candidate of Pakistan Muslim League (N) (PML-N) from Constituency PP-14 (Rawalpindi-XIV) in the 2008 Pakistani general election. He received 26,489 votes and defeated Rashid Naseem Abbasi, a candidate of Pakistan Peoples Party.

He was re-elected to the Provincial Assembly of the Punjab as a candidate of PML-N from Constituency PP-14 (Rawalpindi-XIV) in the 2013 Pakistani general election.
