= Ahmer Rasheed Bhatti =

Pakistani politician

Ahmer Rasheed Bhatti is a Pakistani politician who has been a Member of the Provincial Assembly of the Punjab since 2024.

== Biography ==
Bhatti was born 15 March 1986 in Lahore, Pakistan. He received a Bachelor of Science degree in Finance and Administration.

He was elected to the Provincial Assembly of the Punjab as a Pakistan Tehreek-e-Insaf (PTI)-backed independent candidate from constituency PP-165 Lahore-XXI in the 2024 Pakistani general election. He received 29,390 votes and defeated Shahzad Nazir, a candidate of Pakistan Muslim League (N) who bagged 28,427 votes.

After the election, he was arrested by police in connection with the May 9 riots. Criticism arose on social media regarding his arrest, as it occurred nine months after the riots. PTI supporters argued that his detention was aimed at coercing Bhatti into switching his allegiance to other political party.
