= Rana Liaqat Ali =

Pakistani politician

Member of the Provincial Assembly of the Punjab
- In office 15 August 2018 – 14 January 2023
- Constituency: PP-39 Sialkot-V
- In office 1 June 2013 – 31 May 2018
- Constituency: PP-126 (Sialkot-VI)

Personal details
- Born: 1 January 1959 (age 67) Sialkot, Punjab, Pakistan
- Party: PML–N (2008–present)

Rana Liaqat Ali is a Pakistani politician who had been a Member of the Provincial Assembly of the Punjab from August 2018 till January 2023. Previously he was a member of the Punjab Assembly from June 2013 to May 2018.

== Early life and education ==
He was born on 1 January 1959 in Sialkot to Sulehria Rajput family.

He has received Matriculation level education.

== Political career ==
He was elected to the Provincial Assembly of Punjab as a candidate of Pakistan Muslim League (N) (PML-N) from Constituency PP-126 (Sialkot-VI) in the 2013 Pakistani general election. He served his constituency in a massive way. He gave number of massive developmental schemes to his constituency. Later on in the elections of 2018, he was not given party ticket due to some conflicts. He contested as an independent candidate in elections and won them. He created history in Sialkot as he is the first candidate to win elections independently in history. His brother Rana Shaukat Ali is also a public figure among the masses of Sialkot. He has a lot of services for the constituency PP-39 and looks after all the political aspects in the constituency. He has services for the party as well. He is a prominent figure of PML(N) in the district Sialkot.

He was re-elected to the Provincial Assembly of the Punjab as an independent candidate from Constituency PP-39 (Sialkot-V) in the 2018 Pakistani general election.

Following his successful election, he joined PML-N. He is President of PML(N) in Germany as well since 2008. He has served PML(N) in Germany a lot.
