= Sardar Sher Afgan Gorchani =

Sardar Sher Afgan Gorchani is a Pakistani politician who has been a Member of the Provincial Assembly of the Punjab since 2024.

== Political career ==
He was elected to the Provincial Assembly of the Punjab as a candidate of the Pakistan Muslim League (N) (PML-N) from constituency PP-292 Rajanpur-I in the 2024 Pakistani general election.
