= Noor Shahid Noor =

Pakistani politician

Member of the Provincial Assembly of Punjab
- Incumbent
- Assumed office 24 February 2024

Personal details
- Political party: PTI (2024-present)

Noor Shahid Noor (born 27 January 1980) is a Pakistani politician who has been a Member of the Provincial Assembly of the Punjab since 2024.

== Political career ==
He was elected to the Provincial Assembly of the Punjab as a Pakistan Tehreek-e-Insaf - backed independent candidate from constituency PP-103 Faisalabad-VI in the 2024 Pakistani general election.
