= Faisal Jamil =

Pakistani politician

Faisal Jamil is a Pakistani politician who has been a Member of the Provincial Assembly of the Punjab since 2024.

== Political career ==
He was elected to the Provincial Assembly of the Punjab as a Istehkam-e-Pakistan Party candidate from constituency PP-259 Rahim Yar Khan-V in the 2024 Pakistani general election.
