= Hassan Askari Sheikh =

Pakistani politician

Hassan Askari Sheikh is a Pakistani politician who has been a member of the Provincial Assembly of the Punjab since 2024.

== Political career ==
He was elected to the Provincial Assembly of the Punjab as a candidate of the Pakistan Muslim League (Q) (PML-Q) from Constituency PP-248 Bahawalpur-IV in the 2024 Pakistani general election.
