= Rana Abdul Manan Sajid =

Pakistani politician

Member of the Provincial Assembly of the Punjab
- Incumbent
- Assumed office 24 February 2024
- Constituency: PP-272 Muzaffargarh-V

Personal details
- Party: PMLN (2024-present)

Rana Abdul Manan Sajid is a Pakistani politician who is a member of the Provincial Assembly of the Punjabelected in 2024 Pakistani general election from PP-272 Muzaffargarh-V.

== Political career ==
=== 2024 election ===
In the 2024 Pakistani general election he contested as independent candidate and won. He got 33474 votes. Later he joined the Pakistan Muslim League (N).
