= Shahid Raza =

Pakistani politician

Member of the Provincial Assembly of Punjab
- Incumbent
- Assumed office 24 February 2024

Personal details
- Party: PTI (2024-present)

Shahid Raza is a Pakistani politician who has been a Member of the Provincial Assembly of the Punjab since 2024. Shahid Raza Kotla belongs to the Kotla political family of Gujrat District. He is the brother of former Member of the National Assembly Abid Raza Kotla, former Member of the Provincial Assembly (2013-2018) Shabbir Ahmed Kotla, and Naeem Raza Kotla, a former adviser to the Chief Minister of Punjab.

== Political career ==
He was elected to the Provincial Assembly of the Punjab as a Pakistan Tehreek-e-Insaf-backed independent candidate from constituency PP-28 Gujrat-II in the 2024 Pakistani general election.
