= Jam Aman Ullah =

Pakistani politician

Jam Aman Ullah is a Pakistani politician who has been a Member of the Provincial Assembly of the Punjab since 2024.

== Early life ==
He was born on 11th March 1981 to Jam Ghulam Rasool in Rahim Yar Khan . He holds a BA degree

== Political career ==
He was elected to the Provincial Assembly of the Punjab as a Pakistan Tehreek-e-Insaf-backed independent candidate from constituency PP-261 Rahim Yar Khan-VII in the 2024 Pakistani general election.
