= Rais Nabeel Ahmad =

Pakistani politician

Member of the Provincial Assembly of the Punjab
- In office 15 August 2018 – 14 January 2023
- Constituency: PP-265 Rahim Yar Khan-XI

Personal details
- Party: PPP (2018-present)

Rais Nabeel Ahmad is a Pakistani politician who is a member of the Provincial Assembly of the Punjab from February 2024 to date.

== Political career ==
He was elected to the Provincial Assembly of the Punjab as a candidate of Pakistan Peoples Party from Constituency PP-265 (Rahim Yar Khan-XI) in the 2018 Pakistani general election.
