= Zia Ullah Shah =

Pakistani politician and businessman

Member of the Provincial Assembly of Punjab
- Incumbent
- Assumed office 24 February 2024

Personal details
- Political party: PMLN (2008-present)

Zia Ullah Shah is a Pakistani politician who has been a Member of the Provincial Assembly of the Punjab since 2024. Previously, he served as a member of the Punjab Assembly from 2008 to 2013.

== Early life and education ==
He was born on 22 August 1973. He has a BA degree and did graduated from University of the Punjab in 1994.

He served as a chairman of Water and Sanitation Agency.

== Political career ==
He served as Nazim of Rawalpindi District Council from 2001 to 2005 and again from 2005 to 2008 before getting elected to the Provincial Assembly of the Punjab as a candidate of Pakistan Muslim League (N) (PML-N) from Constituency PP-11 Rawalpindi-V in the 2008 Pakistani general election.

In the 2013 Pakistani general election, he contested for the Punjab Assembly seat as a candidate of PML-N from constituency PP-11 Rawalpindi-XI but was defeated by Raja Rashid Hafeez, a candidate of Pakistan Tehreek-e-Insaf (PTI).

He was re-elected to the Provincial Assembly of the Punjab as a candidate of PML-N from Constituency PP-16 Rawalpindi-X in the 2024 Pakistani general election.

== Assets ==
In 2011, it was reported that according to the declarations of assets submitted by Shah, he possessed a house valued at Rs15 million, business and agriculture property worth Rs10.5 million, and his wife owned 50 tola gold. However, Shah stated that he did not own a car and had a "negligible" amount in the bank. Additionally, he disclosed that he had loans amounting to Rs6.5 million to repay to banks. DAWN remarked Shah's claims of not owning a car were difficult to believe.
