= Amir Hayat Hiraj =

Pakistani politician

Member of the Provincial Assembly of the Punjab
- In office 29 May 2013 – 31 May 2018

Personal details
- Born: 2 January 1982 (age 44) Khanewal, Punjab, Pakistan
- Party: PMLN (2013-present)
- Other political affiliations: PML(Q) (2008-2013)

Amir Hayat Hiraj is a Pakistani politician who was a Member of the Provincial Assembly of the Punjab, from May 2013 to May 2018.

== Early life and education ==
He was born on 2 January 1982 in Khanewal.

He graduated from Bahauddin Zakariya University in 2005.

== Political career ==
He was elected to the Provincial Assembly of the Punjab as a candidate of Pakistan Muslim League (Q) from Constituency PP-216 (Khanewal-V) in the 2008 Pakistani general election. He was Reelected to the Provincial Assembly of the Punjab as a candidate of Pakistan Muslim League (Nawaz) from Constituency PP-216 (Khanewal-V) in the 2013 Pakistani general election.
