= Ghazanfar Ali Khan (Pakistani politician) =

Pakistani politician

Ghazanfar Ali Khan is a Pakistani politician who has been a Member of the Provincial Assembly of the Punjab since 2024.

== Political career ==
He was elected to the Provincial Assembly of the Punjab as a candidate of the Pakistan People's Party (PPP) from constituency PP-255 Rahim Yar Khan-I in the 2024 Pakistani general election.
