= Mehmood Anwar =

Pakistani politician

Member of the Provincial Assembly of the Punjab
- In office 29 May 2013 – 31 May 2018

Personal details
- Born: 18 November 1955 (age 70) Pattoki, Punjab, Pakistan
- Party: PMLN (2013-present)

Mehmood Anwar is a Pakistani politician who was a Member of the Provincial Assembly of the Punjab, from May 2013 to May 2018.

== Early life and education ==
He was born on 18 November 1955 in Pattoki.

He has the degree of Bachelor of Arts.

== Political career ==
He was elected to the Provincial Assembly of the Punjab as a candidate of Pakistan Muslim League (Nawaz) from Constituency PP-182 (Kasur-VIII) in the 2013 Pakistani general election.
