= Jamil Hassan Khan =

Pakistani politician

Member of the Provincial Assembly of the Punjab
- In office 29 May 2013 – 31 May 2018

Personal details
- Born: 4 April 1957 (age 69)
- Party: PMLN

Jamil Hassan Khan is a Pakistani politician who was a Member of the Provincial Assembly of the Punjab, from May 2013 to May 2018.

== Early life ==
He was born on 4 April 1957 in Bucheki, Nankana Sahib province of Punjab.

== Political career ==
He was elected to the Provincial Assembly of the Punjab as a candidate of Pakistan Muslim League (Nawaz) from Constituency PP-174 (Nankana Sahib-V) in the 2013 Pakistani general election.
