= Chaudhry Khalid Mehmood Jajja =

Pakistani politician

Member of the Provincial Assembly of the Punjab
- In office 29 May 2013 – 31 May 2018

Personal details
- Born: 4 December 1969 (age 56) Bahawalpur, Punjab, Pakistan
- Party: PMLN (2013-present)

Chaudhry Khalid Mehmood Jajja is a Pakistani politician who was a Member of the Provincial Assembly of the Punjab, from May 2013 to May 2018.

== Early life and education ==
He was born on 4 December 1969 in Bahawalpur.

He graduated in 1991 from Govt. Sadiq Egerton College Bahawalpur and has a degree of Bachelor of Arts.

== Political career ==
He was elected to the Provincial Assembly of the Punjab as a candidate of Pakistan Muslim League (Nawaz) from Constituency PP-275 (Bahawalpur-IX) in the 2013 Pakistani general election.

In December 2013, he was appointed as Parliamentary Secretary for irrigation.
