= Muhammad Zubair Khan Baloch =

Pakistani politician

- محمد زبیر خان بلوچ

Member of the Provincial Assembly of the Punjab
- Incumbent
- Assumed office 24 February 2024
- Constituency: PP-227 Lodhran-III
- In office August 2013 – 31 May 2018
- Constituency: PP-210 Lodhran-IV

Personal details
- Born: 10 February 1987 (age 39)
- Party: PMLN (2013-present)
- Parent: Siddique Khan Baloch (father)

Muhammad Zubair Khan Baloch is a Pakistani politician and Member of the Provincial Assembly of the Punjab, serving from the 24th of February 2024. In his official appointments, he has functioned as chairperson, Standing Committee on Livestock & Dairy Development till 2018.

== Early life ==
He was born on 10 February 1987.

He completed his intermediate level education in 2004 from Sadiq public School.

== Political career ==
He was elected to the Provincial Assembly of the Punjab as a candidate of Pakistan Muslim League (Nawaz) from Constituency PP-210 (Lodhran-IV) in by-polls held in August 2013.
