= Muhammad Nawaz Chohan =

Pakistani politician

Member of the Provincial Assembly of the Punjab
- In office 15 August 2018 – 14 January 2023
- Constituency: PP-55 Gujranwala-V
- In office December 2012 – 31 May 2018
- Incumbent
- Assumed office 24 February 2024

Personal details
- Born: 13 May 1953 (age 73) Gujranwala, Punjab, Pakistan
- Party: PMLN (2012-present)

Muhammad Nawaz Chohan (born 13 May 1953) is a Pakistani politician who had been a Member of the Provincial Assembly of the Punjab from August 2018 till January 2023. Previously, he was a Member of the Provincial Assembly of the Punjab, from December 2012 to May 2018.

== Early life and education ==
He was born on 13 May 1953 in Gujranwala.

He has received matriculation level education.

== Political career ==
He was elected to the Provincial Assembly of the Punjab as a candidate of Pakistan Muslim League (N) (PML-N) from Constituency PP-92 (Gujranwala-II) in by-polls held in December 2012. He received 36,537 votes and defeated a candidate of Pakistan Peoples Party.

He was re-elected to the Provincial Assembly of the Punjab as a candidate of PML-N from Constituency PP-92 (Gujranwala-II) in the 2013 Pakistani general election.

In December 2013, he was appointed Parliamentary Secretary for transport.

He was re-elected to Provincial Assembly of the Punjab as a candidate of PML-N from Constituency PP-55 (Gujranwala-V) in the 2018 Pakistani general election.
