= Imran Ilyas Chaudhry =

Pakistani politician

Member of Provincial Assembly of Punjab
- Incumbent
- Assumed office 24 February 2024

Personal details
- Party: PMLN (2024-present)

Imran Ilyas Chaudhry is a Pakistani politician who has been a Member of the Provincial Assembly of the Punjab since 2024.

== Political career ==
He was elected to the Provincial Assembly of the Punjab as a candidate of the Pakistan Muslim League (N) (PML-N) from Constituency PP-11 Rawalpindi-V in the 2024 Pakistani general election.
