= Khurram Khan Virk =

Member of the Provincial Assembly of the Punjab
- Incumbent
- Assumed office 24 February 2024

Personal details
- Party: PMLN (2024-present)

Khurram Khan Virk is a Pakistani politician who is a Member of the Provincial Assembly of the Punjab since 24 February 2024.

== Political career ==
He was elected to the Provincial Assembly of the Punjab as an independent candidate from constituency PP-48 Sialkot-V, and later he joined Pakistan Muslim League (N). He became Member of Punjab Assembly by the alleged manipulative results on the Form 47.

== Family Background ==
Khurram Khan Virk hails from a small village named Virk, located near the Sialkot–Zafarwal road close to the Jammu border. He has established his dera (political base) in this village, which served as the center of his political activities and from where he successfully led his campaigns during the 2024 Punjab Assembly elections.

His father, Khizar Iqbal Virk, was also a politician who remained aligned with the Pakistan Muslim League (N) for several decades. The Virk family has a long tradition of political involvement; Khurram Khan Virk’s uncles also contested elections at both the provincial and local government levels, further strengthening the family’s political influence in the region.
