= Chaudhry Nadeem Khadim =

Pakistani politician

Member of the Provincial Assembly of the Punjab

Personal details
- Born: 12 January 1970 (age 56) Okara, Punjab, Pakistan
- Party: AP (2025-present)
- Other political affiliations: PMLN (2018-2025)

Ch Nadeem Khadim (born January 12, 1970, at Okara, Pakistan) is a Pakistani politician and Member of the Pujab Assembly.

== Biography ==
He received his B.A from University of the Punjab, Lahore. He was elected as Member of the Provincial Assembly of the Punjab in the 2008 general elections.

His father, Ch Khadim Hussain, also served for many years in the Punjab Assembly.
