= Sardar Muhammad Asim Sher Maken =

Pakistani politician

Member of the Provincial Assembly of Punjab
- Incumbent
- Assumed office 24 February 2024

Personal details
- Party: PMLN (2024-present)

Sardar Muhammad Asim Sher Maken is a Pakistani politician who has been a Member of the Provincial Assembly of the Punjab since 2024. He is also the Parliamentary Secretary for Punjab Live Stock and Dairy Development.

== Political career ==
He was elected to the Provincial Assembly of the Punjab as a candidate of the Pakistan Muslim League (N) (PML-N) from constituency PP-80 Sargodha-X in the 2024 Pakistani general election.
