= Irfan Shafi Khokhar =

Pakistani politician (1980–2025)

Irfan Shafi Khokhar (Urdu: عرفان شفیع کھوکھر; 16 July 1980 – 21 December 2025) was a Pakistani politician who was a Member of the Provincial Assembly of the Punjab.

== Early life ==
Irfan Shafi Khokhar was born in Lahore, Punjab, Pakistan on 16 July 1980.

== Political career ==
Khokhar was elected to the Provincial Assembly of the Punjab, representing the Pakistan Muslim League (N) (PML-N) from constituency PP-167 Lahore-XXIII, in the 2024 Pakistani general election.

== Death ==
Khokhar died from a heart attack at Lahore Doctors Hospital, on 21 December 2025 at the age of 45.
