= Inam Bari =

Pakistani politician

Inam Bari is a Pakistani politician who has been a Member of the Provincial Assembly of the Punjab since 2024.

== Political career ==
He was elected to the Provincial Assembly of the Punjab as an Pakistan People’s Party candidate from Constituency PP-238 Bahawalnagar-II in the 2024 Pakistani general election.
