= Hassaan Riaz =

Pakistani politician

Member of the Provincial Assembly of the Punjab
- In office October 2014 – 31 May 2018

Personal details
- Born: 27 August 1989 (age 37) Sheikhupura, Punjab, Pakistan
- Party: PMLN (2014-present)

Hassaan Riaz is a Pakistani politician who was a Member of the Provincial Assembly of the Punjab, from October 2014 to May 2018.

== Early life and education ==
He was born on 27 August 1989 in Sheikhupura.

He has a degree of Bachelor of Arts in Journalism which he obtained in 2012 from University of the Punjab.

== Political career ==
He was elected to the Provincial Assembly of the Punjab as a candidate of Pakistan Muslim League (Nawaz) from Constituency PP-162 (Sheikhupura-I) in by-polls held in October 2014.
