= Chaudhary Iftikhar Ahmed Warsi =

Pakistani politician

Member of the Provincial Assembly of the Punjab
- In office 29 May 2013 – 31 May 2018

Personal details
- Born: 29 June 1954 (age 72)
- Party: PMLN

Chaudhary Iftikhar Ahmed Warsi is a Pakistani politician who was a Member of the Provincial Assembly of the Punjab, from May 2013 to May 2018.

== Early life and education ==
He was born on 29 June 1954.

He graduated from Federal Government College, Islamabad No. 2 and has a BA degree.

== Political career ==
He was elected to the Provincial Assembly of the Punjab as a candidate of Pakistan Muslim League (Nawaz) from Constituency PP-3 (Rawalpindi-III) in the 2013 Pakistani general election.
