= Muhammad Naeem Akhtar Khan Bhabha =

Pakistani politician

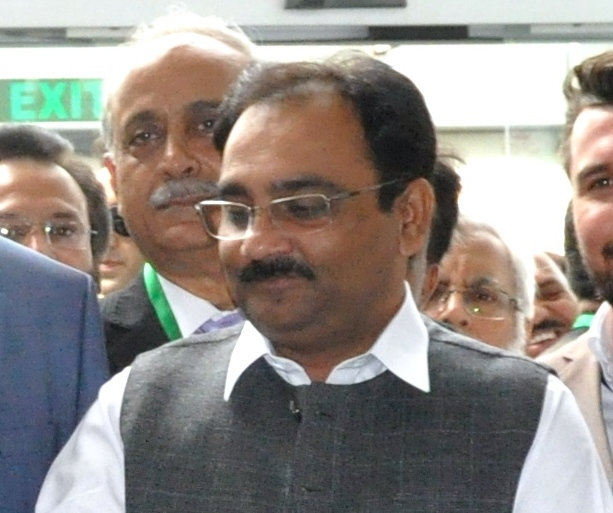
- Muhammad Naeem Akhtar Khan Bhabha

Member of the Provincial Assembly of the Punjab
- Incumbent
- Assumed office 2008

Personal details
- Born: 20 February 1972 (age 54) Vehari District, Punjab, Pakistan
- Party: PMLN (2002-present)

Muhammad Naeem Akhtar Khan Bhabha is a Pakistani politician who was a Member of the Provincial Assembly of the Punjab from 2008 to May 2018. He was appointed to the post of Provincial Minister of Punjab for Agriculture in 2016.

== Early life and education ==
He was born on 20 February 1972 in Vehari District, Punjab.

He graduated from University of the Punjab.

== Political career ==
He was elected to the Provincial Assembly of the Punjab as a candidate of Pakistan Muslim League (N) (PML-N) from Constituency PP-237 (Vehari-VI) in the 2008 Pakistani general election.

He was re-elected to the Provincial Assembly of the Punjab as an independent candidate from Constituency PP-237 (Vehari-VI) in the 2013 Pakistani general election. He joined PML-N in May 2013. In December 2013, he was appointed as Parliamentary Secretary for communication and works.

In November 2016, he was inducted into the provincial Punjab cabinet of Chief Minister Shehbaz Sharif and was made Provincial Minister of Punjab for Agriculture.
