= Muhammad Ahmad Khan Leghari =

Pakistani politician

Muhammad Ahmad Khan Leghari is a Pakistani politician who has been a Member of the Provincial Assembly of the Punjab since 2024.

== Political career ==
Leghari ran for the seat of the Provincial Assembly of the Punjab from Constituency PP-290 Dera Ghazi Khan-VI in the 2018 Pakistani general election but was unsuccessful. He received 28,470 votes and lost the seat to Ahmad Ali Khan Dreshak.

He was elected to the Provincial Assembly of the Punjab as a candidate of the Pakistan Muslim League (N) (PML-N) from Constituency PP-291 Dera Ghazi Khan-VI in the 2024 Pakistani general election. He received 38,102 votes and defeated Muhammad Faheem Saeed, Pakistan Tehreek-e-Insaf backed independent candidate, who secured 36,577 votes.
