= Ghulam Dastagir Lak =

Member of the Provincial Assembly of the Punjab
- In office 29 May 2013 – 31 May 2018

Personal details
- Born: 27 April 1940 (age 86)
- Other political affiliations: Pakistan Muslim League (Nawaz)
- Children: Hamza Dastagir Lak(Son) Ayesha Dastagir Lak(Daughter)

Ghulam Dastagir Lak is a Pakistani businessman, landlord and a politician who was a Member of the Provincial Assembly of the Punjab, from May 2013 to May 2018. Mr Ghulam Dastagir Lak son of Mr Jahan Khan Lak has served as Member, Provincial Assembly of the Punjab during 1985-88, 1988- 90, 1990-93 and 1993-96 and operated as Minister for Food throughout 1985- 88 as well as Minister for Transport during 1993-96. He has actually returned to the Punjab Assembly for the 5th term in general political elections 2013-2018.

== Early life ==
He was born on 27 April 1940.

== Political career ==
He was elected to the Provincial Assembly of the Punjab as a candidate of Pakistan Muslim League (Nawaz) from Constituency PP-29 (Sargodha-II) in the 2013 Pakistani general election.
