= Noor Ul Amin Wattoo =

Pakistani politician

Member of the Provincial Assembly of the Punjab
- In office 15 August 2018 – 14 January 2023
- Constituency: PP-186 Okara-IV

Personal details
- Party: PMLN

Noor Ul Amin Wattoo is a Pakistani politician who had been a member of the Provincial Assembly of the Punjab from August 2018 till January 2023.

== Political career ==
He was elected to the Provincial Assembly of the Punjab as a candidate of Pakistan Muslim League (N) from Constituency PP-186 (Okara-IV) in the 2018 Pakistani general election.

He was re-elected the member of Punjab Assembly as PML-N candidate from PP-188 Okara-IV and defeated independent candidate Moazzam Jahanzaib Wattoo in the 2024 General Elections.
