= Muhammad Iqbal (Multan politician) =

Pakistani politician

Muhammad Iqbal is a Pakistani politician who has been a Member of the Provincial Assembly of the Punjab since 2024.

== Political career ==
He was elected to the Provincial Assembly of the Punjab as a candidate of the Pakistan People's Party (PPP) from constituency PP-220 Multan-VIII in the 2024 Pakistani general election.
