= Javed Niaz Manj =

Pakistani politician

Member of the Provincial Assembly of the Punjab
- Incumbent
- Assumed office 24 February 2024
- Constituency: PP-107 Faisalabad-X

Personal details
- Party: PTI (2024-present)

Javed Niaz Manj (9 January 1948) is a Pakistani politician who has been a Member of the Provincial Assembly of the Punjab since 2024.

== Political career ==
He was elected to the Provincial Assembly of the Punjab as a Pakistan Tehreek-e-Insaf-backed independent candidate from constituency PP-107 Faisalabad-X in the 2024 Pakistani general election.
