= Nadeem Sadiq Dogar =

Pakistani politician

Member of the Provincial Assembly of the Punjab
- Incumbent
- Assumed office 24 February 2024
- Constituency: PP-113 Faisalabad-XVI

Personal details
- Born: 1 April 1970 (age 56) Faisalabad, Punjab, Pakistan
- Party: PTI (2024-present)

Nadeem Sadiq Dogar is a Pakistani politician who has been a Member of the Provincial Assembly of the Punjab since 2024.

== Political career ==
He was elected to the Provincial Assembly of the Punjab as a Pakistan Tehreek-e-Insaf-backed independent candidate from Constituency PP-113 Faisalabad-XVI in the 2024 Pakistani general election.
