= Razi Ullah Khan =

Razi Ullah Khan is a Pakistani politician who has been a Member of the Provincial Assembly of the Punjab since 2024.

== Political career ==
He was elected to the Provincial Assembly of the Punjab as a Pakistan Tehreek-e-Insaf-backed independent candidate from constituency PP-226 Lodhran-II in the 2024 Pakistani general election.
