= Farzana Khalil =

Pakistani politician

Farzana Khalil is a Pakistani politician who has been a Member of the Provincial Assembly of the Punjab since 2024.

== Political career ==
She was elected to the Provincial Assembly of the Punjab as a Pakistan Tehreek-e-Insaf-backed independent candidate from Constituency PP-246 Bahawalpur-II in the 2024 Pakistani general election.
