= Ahmad Mujtaba Chaudhry =

Ahmad Mujtaba Chaudhary

Member of the Provincial Assembly of Punjab
- Incumbent
- Assumed office 23 February 2024

Personal details
- Born: 19 March 1986 (age 40) Faisalabad
- Party: PTI (2007-present)

Ahmad Mujtaba Chaudhary (born 19 March 1986) is a Pakistani politician who has been a member of the Provincial Assembly of the Punjab since 2024.

== Early life ==
Born in Khurrianwala, Faisalabad, he is the son of Dr. Muhammad Shafique Chaudhary. His father was elected as a Member of the National Assembly in 1985, and subsequently was elected three-times as a Member of the Punjab Assembly. He also served in the cabinet as Minister for Excise and Taxation, Punjab.

He is the maternal grandson of Mian Iqbal Kastro, a prominent political and social figure of Faisalabad. A stalwart of the All-Pakistan Muslim League since the early 1950s, he was given the honorary moniker of "Kastro" by Fatima Jinnah during her Presidential campaign in 1964 for his bravery and resolute commitment against the dictatorship of Field Marshall Ayub Khan. He is the nephew of Khayal Ahmad Kastro, a two-time Member of the Punjab Assembly and former Minister for Colonies and Culture from Pakistan Tehreek-e-Insaf.

He received his early education from Aitchison College, Lahore.

He has degrees in B.Sc. (hons.) in Economics and M.A. in Philosophy, Politics and Economics, major International Politics. He has studied at the Universität Witten/Herdecke, Germany, Université Paris Nanterre, France and Sapienza Università di Roma, Italy.

== Political career ==
He was elected to the Provincial Assembly of the Punjab as a Pakistan Tehreek-e-Insaf-backed independent candidate from constituency PP-99 Faisalabad-II in the 2024 Pakistani general election.

He is serving as Member of Public Accounts Committee I, Punjab, as Member of Finance Committee, Punjab and as Member of Task Force on UN Sustainable Developments Goals (SDGs).

He is a member of Insaf Student Federation (ISF) since 2007. He is the only Member of the Punjab Assembly in 2024 from ISF.

In May 2026, he was invited as a state guest by the Chinese government to represent Pakistan Tehreek-e-Insaf at the 75th Anniversary of Diplomatic Relationships between China and Pakistan in Beijing.

== Suspension ==
On 28 June 2025, Chaudhary was among 26 members of the opposition who were suspended from the Punjab Assembly for 15 sittings. The action was taken by Speaker Malik Muhammad Ahmed Khan following a disruption during Chief Minister Maryam Nawaz's address. The suspended lawmakers were accused of disorderly conduct, including chanting slogans, tearing official documents, and surrounding the speaker’s dais. The speaker also forwarded references against the suspended members to the Election Commission of Pakistan for further action. The references were dropped by the Election Commission of Pakistan and the suspended members were reinstated after 5 sittings.
