= Fateh Khaliq =

Pakistani politician

Member of the Provincial Assembly of the Punjab
- In office 15 August 2018 – 14 January 2023
- Constituency: PP-82 Khushab-I
- Incumbent
- Assumed office 24 February 2024

Personal details
- Party: PTI (2018-present)

Fateh Khaliq is a Pakistani politician who had been a member of the Provincial Assembly of the Punjab from August 2018 till January 2023. He is the son of politician and landlord Malik Khaliq Dad Bandial.

== Political career ==
He was elected to the Provincial Assembly of the Punjab as a candidate of the Pakistan Tehreek-e-Insaf (PTI) from PP-82 (Khushab-I) in the 2018 Punjab provincial election. He was re-elected to the Provincial Assembly of Punjab as an independent candidate supported by Pakistan Tehreek-e-Insaf from PP 84 (Khushab).
