= Muhammad Anas Mehmood =

Pakistani politician

Muhammad Anas Mehmood is a Pakistani politician who has been a Member of the Provincial Assembly of the Punjab since 2024.He is Elected From PP-166 & Currently holds office of parliamentary Secretary for youth & Sports Affairs Punjab. Main town in his constituency are Manga Mandi & Chungh along with BAhria town Lahore .His Grand Father Malik Muhammad Hayat who Was A Zaildaar before Partition Remained Member District Council In 1967 & Participated In General From PML & stood 2nd In PP-77 In 1970 .

== Political career ==
He was elected to the Provincial Assembly of the Punjab as a candidate of the Pakistan Muslim League (N) (PML-N) from constituency PP-166 Lahore-XXII in the 2024 Pakistani general election.
