= Shahbaz Ali Khokhar =

Pakistani politician

Shahbaz Ali Khokhar is a Pakistani politician who has been a Member of the Provincial Assembly of the Punjab since 2024.

== Political career ==
He was elected to the Provincial Assembly of the Punjab as a candidate of the Pakistan Muslim League (N) (PML-N) from constituency PP-162 Lahore-XVIII in the 2024 Pakistani general election.
