= Khalid Zubair Nisar =

Pakistani politician

Khalid Zubair Nisar is a Pakistani politician who has been a Member of the Provincial Assembly of the Punjab since 2024.

== Suspension ==
On 28 June 2025, Nisar was among 26 members of the opposition who were suspended from the Punjab Assembly for 15 sittings. The action was taken by Speaker Malik Muhammad Ahmed Khan following a disruption during Chief Minister Maryam Nawaz's address. The suspended lawmakers were accused of disorderly conduct, including chanting slogans, tearing official documents, and surrounding the speaker’s dais. The speaker also forwarded references against the suspended members to the Election Commission of Pakistan for further action.

== Political career ==
He was elected to the Provincial Assembly of the Punjab as a Pakistan Tehreek-e-Insaf-backed independent candidate from constituency PP-231 Vehari-III in the 2024 Pakistani general election.
