= Rana Tahir Shabbir =

Pakistani politician

Member of the Provincial Assembly of the Punjab
- In office 29 May 2013 – 31 May 2018

Personal details
- Born: 1 January 1970 (age 56) Multan, Punjab, Pakistan
- Party: PPP (2024-present)
- Other political affiliations: PMLN (2013-2024)

Rana Tahir Shabbir is a Pakistani politician who was a Member of the Provincial Assembly of the Punjab, from May 2013 to May 2018.

== Early life and education ==
He was born on 1 January 1970 in Multan.

He has received Matriculation level education.

== Political career ==
He was elected to the Provincial Assembly of the Punjab as a candidate of Pakistan Muslim League (Nawaz) from Constituency PP-203 (Multan-X) in the 2013 Pakistani general election.
