= Waqas Hassan Mokal =

Pakistani politician

Member of the Provincial Assembly of the Punjab
- In office 29 May 2013 – 31 May 2018

Personal details
- Born: 23 June 1976 (age 50) Faisalabad, Punjab, Pakistan
- Party: PTI (2025-present)
- Other political affiliations: PML(Q) (2013-2025)

Sardar Vickas Hassan Mokal is a Pakistani politician who was a Member of the Provincial Assembly of the Punjab, from May 2013 to May 2018.

Sardar Vickas Hasan Mokal son of Sardar Hasan Akhtar Mokal was born on June 23, 1976, at Faisalabad. He graduated in 1994 from Government College, Lahore and obtained the degree of M.Sc (Economics) in 1997 from Lahore School of Economics, Lahore. An agriculturist, who has been elected as Member, Provincial Assembly of the Punjab in general elections 2013 and is functioning as Chairman, Standing Committee on Management & Professional Development Department. He has visited Japan, India, US, UK and Saudi Arabia. Three publications titled “Textile Policy 2005” published in 2002-03; “SME Development” published in 2005; and “Leather, Jems and Jewellery Textiles Ceramics” published in 2009 are to his credit. His father, served as Member Punjab Assembly for six consecutive terms during 1985-88, 1988–90, 1990–93, 1993–96, 1997–99 and 2002–07 and functioned as Deputy Speaker Punjab Assembly during 1988-90 and 1997–99; and as Minister for Public Health Engineering, Management & Professional Development during 2002-07. He Deafated Non League Candidate Ahsan Raza Khan in General Election 2013.

== Early life and education ==
He was born on 23 June 1976 in Faisalabad.

He graduated his 1994 from Government College, Lahore and has a degree of Master of Science in Economics where he obtained in 1997 from Lahore School of Economics.

== Political career ==
He was elected to the Provincial Assembly of the Punjab as a candidate of Pakistan Muslim League (Q) from Constituency PP-180 (Kasur-VI) in the 2013 Pakistani general election.

He lost two Constantly elections 2018 or 2024 in pp180.
