= Mushtaq Ahmed (Pakistani politician) =

Pakistani politician

Brigadier Mushtaq Ahmed

Member of the Provincial Assembly of Punjab
- Incumbent
- Assumed office 24 February 2024

Personal details
- Party: PTI (2024-present)

Mushtaq Ahmed is a Pakistani retired army officer and politician who has been a Member of the Provincial Assembly of the Punjab since 2024.

== Political career ==
He was elected to the Provincial Assembly of the Punjab as a Pakistan Tehreek-e-Insaf-backed independent candidate from constituency PP-26 Jhelum-III in the 2024 Pakistani general election.
