= Rana Mannan Khan =

Pakistani politician

Member of the Provincial Assembly of the Punjab
- In office 15 August 2018 – 14 January 2023
- Constituency: PP-48 Narowal-III
- In office 29 May 2013 – 31 May 2018
- Incumbent
- Assumed office 24 February 2024

Personal details
- Born: 1 October 1976 (age 50)
- Party: PMLN (2013-present)

Rana Mannan Khan (Urdu: رانا منان خان) is a Pakistani politician who has had been a Member of the Provincial Assembly of the Punjab from August 2018 till January 2023. Previously he was a member of the Punjab Assembly from May 2013 to May 2018.

== Early life and education ==
He was born in Punjabi Rajput Sulehria family on 1 October 1976 in Shakargarh Narowal.

He has a degree of Bachelor of Arts which he received in 1996 from University of the Punjab.

== Political career ==
He was elected to the Provincial Assembly of the Punjab as a candidate of Pakistan Muslim League (Nawaz) (PML-N) from Constituency PP-134 (Narowal-III) in the 2013 Pakistani general election.

He was re-elected to Provincial Assembly of the Punjab as a candidate of PML-N from Constituency PP-48 (Narowal-III) in the 2018 Pakistani general election.
