= Shehryar Malik =

Pakistani politician

Member of the Provincial Assembly of the Punjab
- In office April 2017 – 31 May 2018

Personal details
- Party: PMLN (2017-present)
- Occupation: Politician

Shehryar Malik is a Pakistani politician who was a Member of the Provincial Assembly of the Punjab.

== Political career ==
He was elected to the Provincial Assembly of the Punjab as a candidate of Pakistan Muslim League (Nawaz) from Constituency PP-23 (Chakwal-IV) in by polls held in April 2017.
