= Sardar Habib Ur Rehman Khan =

Pakistani politician

Sardar Habib Ur Rehman Khan is a Pakistani politician who has been a Member of the Provincial Assembly of the Punjab since 2024.

== Political career ==
He was elected to the Provincial Assembly of the Punjab as a candidate of the Pakistan People's Party (PPP) from constituency PP-264 Rahim Yar Khan-X in the 2024 Pakistani general election.
