= Imran Akram =

Pakistani politician

Imran Akram is a Pakistani politician who has been a member of the Provincial Assembly of the Punjab since 2024.

== Political career ==
He was elected to the Provincial Assembly of the Punjab as a candidate of the Pakistan Muslim League (N) (PML-N) from constituency PP-195 Pakpattan-III in the 2024 Pakistani general election.
