= Chaudhry Mehmood Ahmad Sungran =

Pakistani politician

Member of the Provincial Assembly of Punjab
- Incumbent
- Assumed office 24 February 2024

Personal details
- Party: PTI (2026-present)
- Other political affiliations: TLP (2024-2026)

Chaudhry Mehmood Ahmad Sungran is a Pakistani politician who has been a Member of the Provincial Assembly of the Punjab since 2024.

== Political career ==
He was elected to the Provincial Assembly of the Punjab as a candidate of Tehreek-e-Labbaik Pakistan (TLP) from Constituency PP-55 Narowal-II in the 2024 Pakistani general election.
