= Mian Ijaz Hussain Bhatti =

Pakistani politician

Member of the Provincial Assembly of the Punjab
- In office 15 August 2018 – 14 January 2023
- Constituency: PP-131 Nankana Sahib-I

Personal details
- Party: JI (2025-present)
- Other political affiliations: PMLN (2018-2025)

Mian Ijaz Hussain Bhatti is a Pakistani politician who served as a member of the Provincial Assembly of the Punjab from August 2018 to January 2023.

== Early life and education ==
He was born on 17 July 1953 in Sangla Hill Tehsil, Pakistan.

He received intermediate-level education.

== Political career ==
He was elected to the Provincial Assembly of the Punjab as a candidate of Pakistan Muslim League (N) from Constituency PP-131 (Nankana Sahib-I) in the 2018 Pakistani general election.
