= Khurram =

Khurram, also spelt Khorram, Khoram and Hürrem, is a masculine given name and a surname of Persian origin. Notable people with the name are as follows:

== Given name ==
- Babak Khorram-din (795–838), rebel leader of the Khurramites
- Hürrem Sultan (1504–1558), first chief consort of the Ottoman Empire
- İskenderpaşazade Hürrem Pasha (died 1526), Ottoman statesman
- Mirza Shahab-ud-Din Muhammad Khurram (1592–1666), Mughal emperor
- Khurram Khan Panni (1921–1997), Bengali zamindar and politician
- Khurram Murad (1932–1996), Pakistani scholar of Islam
- Khurram Khan Chowdhury (1945–2021), Bangladeshi politician
- Khandakar Mohammad Khurram Sherpuri (1953–2018), Bangladeshi politician
- Abdul Karim Khoram (born 1963), Afghan politician
- Khurram Inam (born 1966), Pakistani skeet shooter
- Khurram Shehzad (born 1955), Pakistani politician
- Khurram Dastgir Khan (born 1970), Pakistani federal minister
- Khurram Khan (born 1971), Emirati cricketer
- Mian Khurram Jahangir Wattoo (born 1976), Pakistani politician
- Khurram Hussain Agha (born 1976), Pakistani snooker player
- Syed Khurram Zaki (1976–2016), Pakistani journalist
- Khurram Parvez (born 1977), Kashmiri activist
- Khurram Chohan (born 1980), Canadian cricketer
- Chowdhury Khurram Ijaz Chattha (born 1980), Pakistani politician
- Khurram Abbas Sial (born 1981), Pakistani politician
- Khurram Shahzad (born 1981), Pakistani weightlifter
- Khurram Shehzad (born 1982), Pakistani cricketer
- Khurram Shahzad Virk (born 1983), Pakistani politician
- Khurram Manzoor (born 1986), Pakistani cricketer
- Khurram Nawaz Khan (born 1986), Omani cricketer
- Khurram Shahzad (born 1988), Qatari cricketer
- Khurram Shazad (born 1990), English footballer
- Khurram Shahzad (born 1993), Pakistani cricketer
- Khurram Shahzad (born 1999), Pakistani cricketer
- Raja Khurram Shehzad Nawaz, Pakistani politician
- Khurram Khan Virk, Pakistani politician
- Khurram Munawar Manj, Pakistani politician
- Khurram Karim Soomro, Sindhi politician

== Surname ==
- Muhammad Khurram (1920–1994), Pakistani field hockey player
- Ali Ahmad Khurram (1931–1977), Afghan minister
- Sadiq Mahmud Khurram (born 1973), Pakistani High Court justice

== Places ==
- Khurram Colony, Pakistan
- Hagia Sophia Hurrem Sultan Bathhouse, Turkey
- Hürrem Sultan Complex, Turkey
- Khorram Daraq, Zanjan, Iran
- Khorramdasht Rural District (Kashan County), Iran
  - Khorramdasht, Kashan, village
- Khorramdasht, Nain, Iran
- Khorramdasht District, Qazvin, Iran
- Khorram Dasht Rural District (Hamadan Province), Iran
- Khorramdasht Rural District (Kuhbanan County), Iran
- Khorram Dasht Rural District (Markazi Province), Iran

== See also ==
- Hürrem Sultan'ın Torunları (book)
