= Khurram Shahzad =

Khurram Shahzad or Shehzad may refer to:

- Khurram Shahzad (Pakistani cricketer, born 1993), Pakistani cricketer
- Khurram Shahzad (Pakistani cricketer, born 1999), Pakistani cricketer
- Khurram Shahzad (Qatari cricketer) (born 1988), Qatari cricketer
- Khurram Shahzad (weightlifter) (born 1981), Pakistani weightlifter
- Khurram Shehzad (cricketer, born 1982), Pakistani cricketer
- Khurram Shehzad (politician) (born 1969), Pakistani politician
