= Foreign relations of the Mughal Empire =

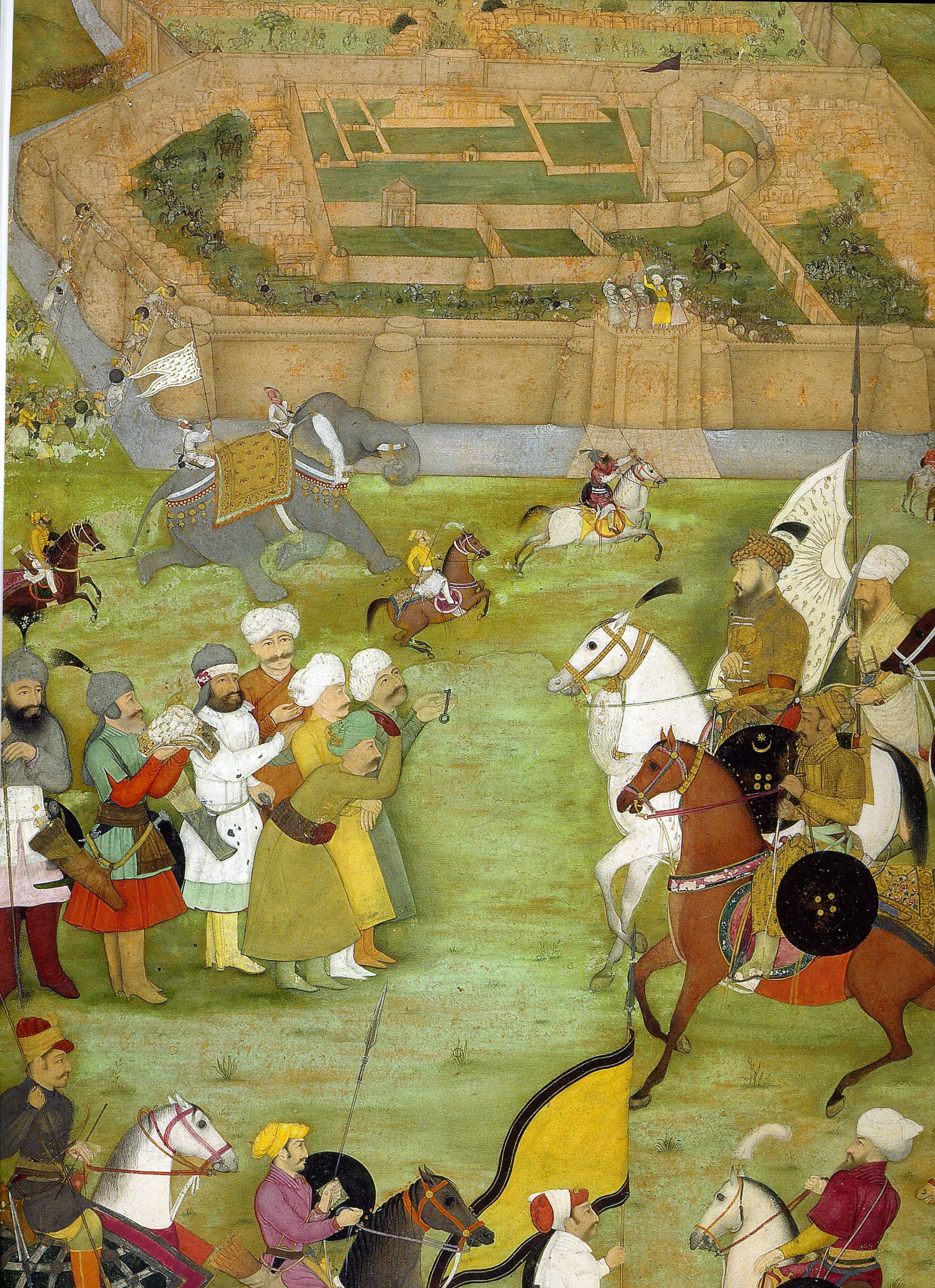
The Surrender of Kandahar, a miniature painting from the Padshahnama depicting Persians surrendering keys of the city to Kilij Khan in 1638.

The foreign relations of the Mughal Empire were characterized by competition with Safavid Persia to the west, the Marathas and others to the south, and the British to the east. Steps were taken by successive Mughal rulers to secure the western frontiers of India. The Khyber Pass along the Kabul-Qandahar route was the natural defence for India, and their foreign policy revolved around securing these outposts, as also balancing the rise of powerful empires in the region.

During the break up of the Timurid Empire in the 15th century, the Ottomans in Turkey, the Safavids in Persia and the Uzbeks in Central Asia emerged as the new contenders of power. While the Safavids were Shia by faith, the Ottomans along with Uzbeks were Sunni. The Mughals were also Sunni and Uzbeks were their natural enemies, who caused Babur and other Timurid princes to leave Khorasan and Samarkand. The powerful Uzbeks who held sway over central Asia sought an alliance of Sunni powers to defeat the Shia-ruled Persia, but Mughals were too broadminded to be driven away by the sectarian conflicts. The Mughal emperors, especially Akbar, were keen to develop strong ties with Persia in order to balance the warring Uzbeks. Thus, the foreign policy of Mughals was centred around strengthening their ties with Persia, while maintaining the balance of power in the region by keeping a check on the evolution of a united Uzbek empire.

== Arabian Peninsula ==
The Mughal emperors were generally enthusiastic with their donation with the Shariff of Mecca.

Mariam-uz-Zamani built a massive trading ship named Rahīmī for trade and Hajj pilgrims at the Khizri Darwaza on the Ravi River. This place was later renamed by Maharaja Ranjit Singh as Sheranwala Darwaza. The Rahimi was homeported in Surat but often travelled to Jeddah, the port near Mecca on the Red Sea, where she carried merchandise for the vendors of the holy city and trafficked in pilgrims on various parts of their journey. The successor of Shah Jahan, Aurangzeb, also owned a trading ship bigger than Rahīmī, Ganj-i-Sawai, which mainly purposed for annual Hajj pilgrimage travel from India to Hejaz.

Another example was the Mughal emperor appointing an official title of "Mir Haj" in 1577 with 500,000 rupee and 10,000 Khil'lat for attribution for the Shariff, and distributing many more to the peoples of Mecca and Medina (which usually called al-Haramayn, or two holiest cities of Islam). Aside from minted coins, the Mughals also gave more non currency gifts such as candlestick studded with diamonds, which estimated as 100 carats according to some historians. At one point, the Shariff of Mecca also exchanging gift with the Mughal by giving them Arabian horses, high quality swords, and some sacred relics.

Mughal chronicler Muhammad Saqi Musta'id Khan has recorded in his work, Ma'asir-i-Alamgiri, that emperor Aurangzeb, who known for his strict observance of Islamic teachings. Aurangzeb also has reportedly shipped two Quran manuscripts which personally transcribed by himself to Medina as gifts. Rishad Choudhury interprets the phrase "ba-masāba hajj-i kobra būd" in the Ma'asir-i-Alamgiri to suggest that Aurangzeb's patronage of the Hajj through financial support, Quranic offerings, and salaried delegates was considered spiritually equivalent to performing the pilgrimage himself.

== Europeans ==
The Mughal Empire had developed relationships with Europeans such as British, Portuguese, Russia, and France.

Mughal relations with the British in the 16th century were quite difficult, as local Mughal officials usually exploited the East India Company, who responded the Mughal's harmful policies towards the British interest with harassing the Mughal vessels at the sea. The Mughals, with dominant military power in India, usually responded with threats, which caused the EIC to cease hostilities and both sides returned the status quo relationship.

=== Britain ===
The East India Company persuaded King James I to send Thomas Roe as a royal envoy to the Agra court of the Mughal emperor, Jahangir. Roe resided at Agra for three years.

Together with Thomas Roe, William Hawkins, captain of Hector, a first company ship, arrived at Surat in India on 24 August 1608. William travelled to Agra to negotiate consent for a factory from Emperor Jahangir in 1609. Hawkins even gained trust from emperor Jahangir and was appointed as Mansabdar or military governor of Mughal territories. Hawkins himself has provided records about the details about the administrations of Mansabdar, where during his life, he has recorded about 41 names of Mansabdar officers who commanded about 3,000-5,000 Zat or horsemens. Roe allegedly gained favour of Jahangir and may have been his drinking partner; certainly he arrived with gifts of "many crates of red wine" However, It was thought that Roe's political career in the Mughal court also ended due to a report about roe's drinking habit reached Jahangir, who strongly forbade wine in his court. This incident caused Roe to fell from favour of Jahangir.

In the thirty years following 1603, the trading factories established by the English on at Machilipatnam (estd. 1611) reported to English Bantam.

=== Dutch ===
The Mughal Empire also recorded to establish relationship the Dutch, particularly with their trading company Dutch East India Company, as shown when the Dutch has established their embassy within Mughal empire. The company representative, Van Adrichem, was presented with Arabian horses, a red cloth, green cloth, lacquered palanquin, Japanese drawer, several Japanese boxes, a Venetian made mirror, two Japanese shields, and couple of exotic Bird-of-paradise. The first Dutch factory was first established at Surat by Pieter van den Btoecke.

Dutch Suratte (Note: Agra and Burhanpur not in their actual position)

In 1602, the Dutch government sponsoring the creation of a single "United East Indies Company" that was also granted monopoly over the Asian trade. For a time in the seventeenth century, it was able to monopolise the trade in nutmeg, mace, and cloves and to sell these spices across European kingdoms and Akbar of the Mughal Empire at 14–17 times the price it paid in Indonesia.

During the reign of Jahangir, after intense lobbying by VOC factors during Jahangir's visit to Ahmedabad, Jahangir issued the first known Firman directed towards the VOC in Gujarat, contained in a letter from P. G. van Ravesteyn and A. W. Goeree to Jan Pieterszoon Coen, dated 12 March 1618. The firman granted few notable assurances to the factors, such as freedom to trade at any Mughal ports, autonomy to govern their affairs, application of normal customs duty (believed to be 2.5% during Jahangir's reign), freedom to trade with local merchants and profess their religion.

=== France ===
In 1667, the French East India Company ambassadors Le Gouz and Bebert presented Louis XIV of France's letter which urged the protection of French merchants from various rebels in the Deccan. In response to the letter, Aurangzeb issued a firman allowing the French to open a factory in Surat.

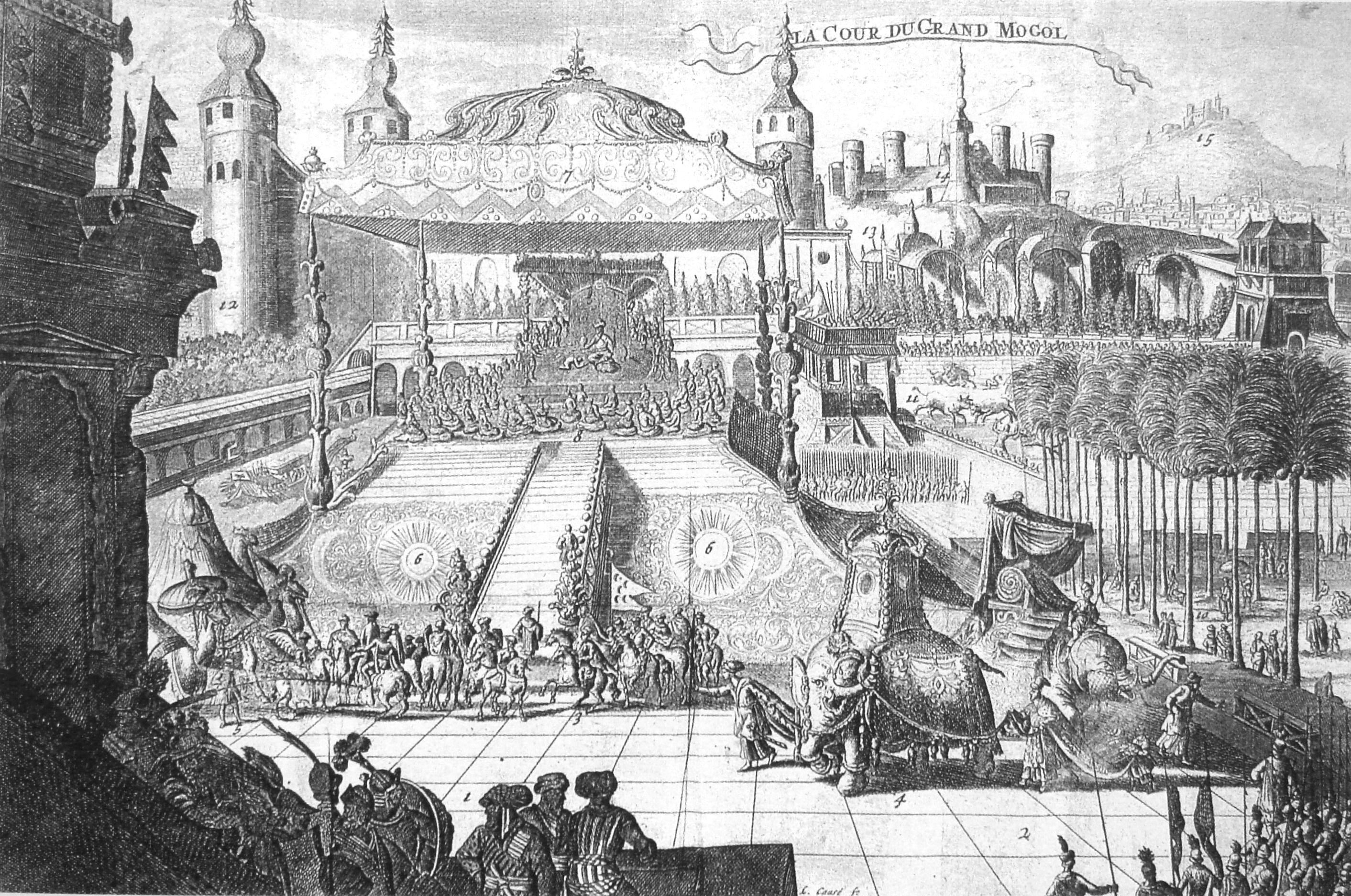
François Bernier, was a French physician and traveller, who for 12 years was the personal physician of Aurangzeb. He described his experiences in Travels in the Mughal Empire.

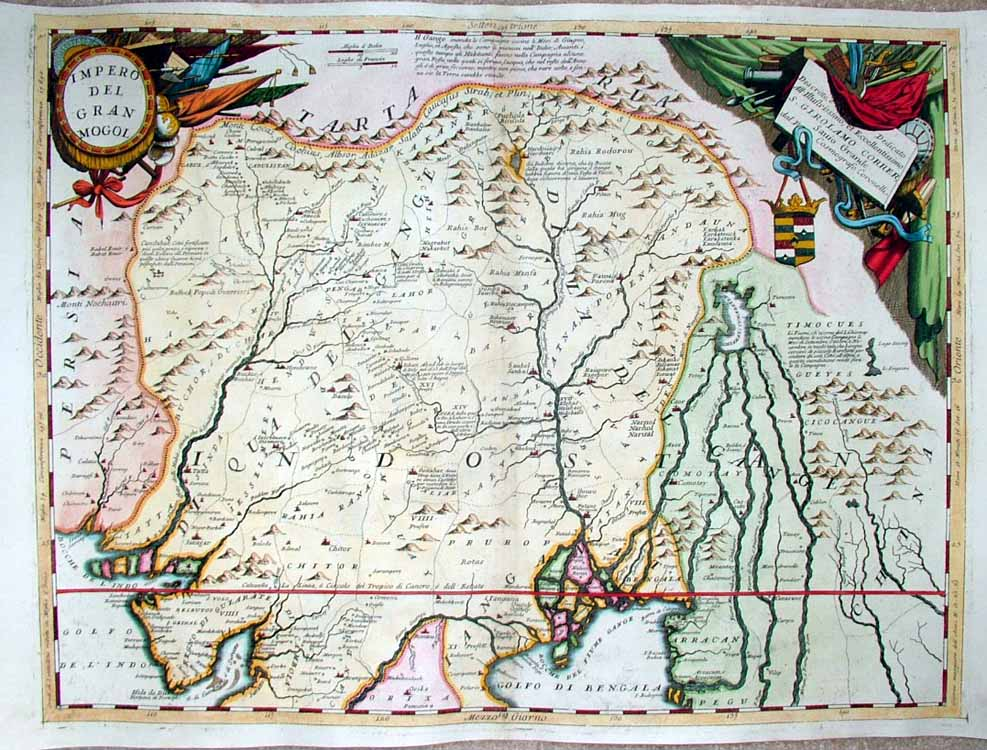
Map of the Mughal Empire by Vincenzo Coronelli (1650–1718) of Venice, who served as Royal Geographer to Louis XIV of France.

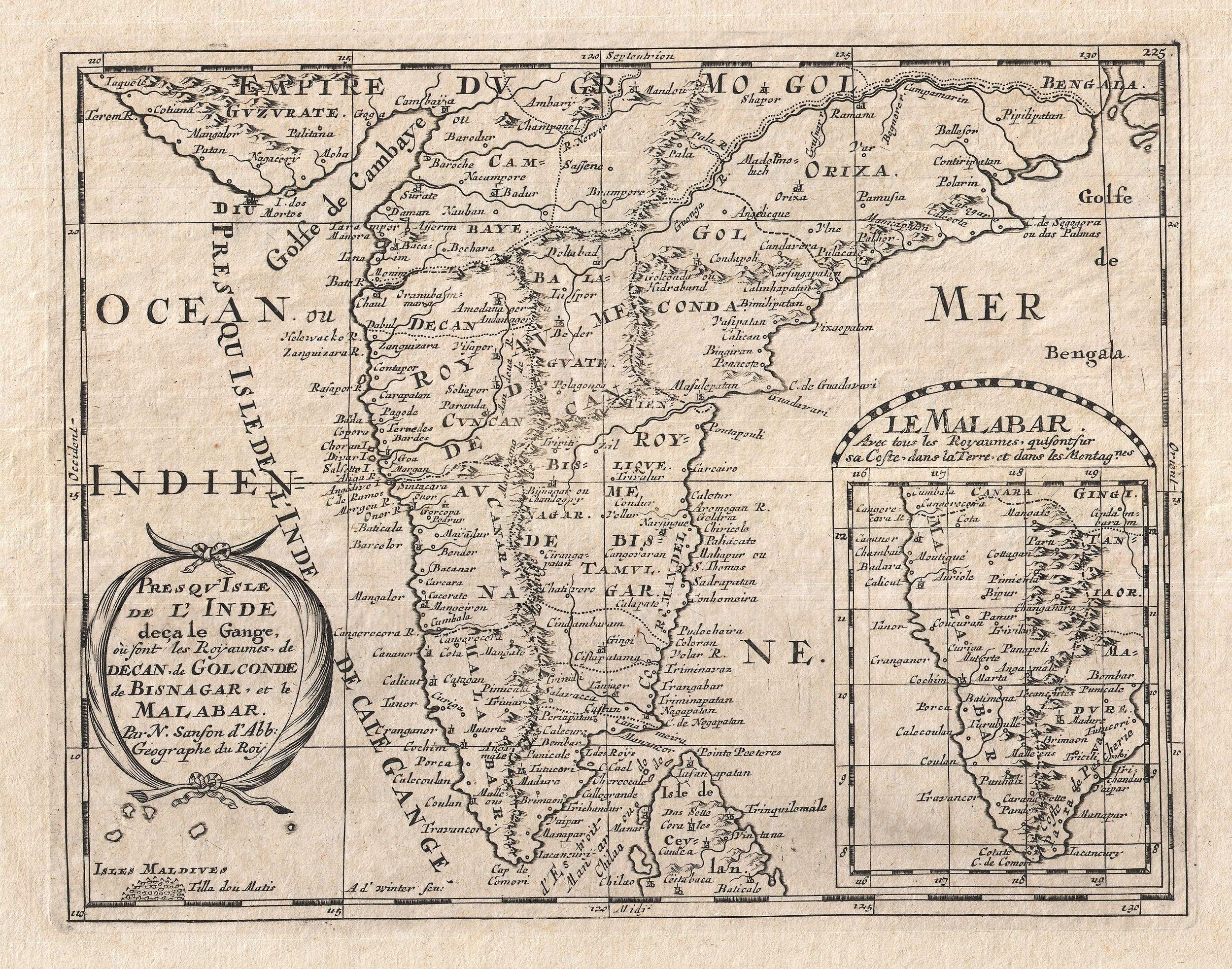
French map of the Deccan.

François Caron succeeded in founding French outposts at Surat around 1668; where he was said to be accompanied by a Persian named Marcara, and at Masulipatam around 1669; and Louis XIV acknowledged those successes by awarding him the Order of St. Michael.

== Ethiopian Empire ==
Ethiopian Emperor Fasilides dispatched an embassy to India in 1664–1665 to congratulate Aurangzeb upon his accession to the throne of the Mughal Empire.

== Aceh Sultanate ==
For decades, the Malabari Mappila Muslims which representing the Mughal Empire are already patronized Aceh Sultanate. Aurangzeb, and his brother, Dara Shikoh, participated with Aceh trade and Aurangzeb himself also exchanging presents with the Sultan of Aceh in 1641. In that year, it is recorded the daughter of Iskandar Muda, Sultanah Safiatuddin, has presented Aurangzeb with eight elephants.

When the Dutch East India Company tried to disrupt the trade in Aceh to make their own Malaka trade lucrative, Aurangzeb threatened the Dutch with retaliation against any losses in Gujarat due to Dutch intervention. This effort were caused due to VOC realization that Muslim tradings were damaging to the VOC. The Firman issued by Aurangzeb caused the VOC to back down and allowed Indian sailors to pass into Aceh, Perak, and Kedah, without any restrictions.

== Safavid dynasty ==
In 1626, Emperor Jahangir began to contemplate an alliance between the Ottoman Empire, the Mughals, and the Khanate of Bukhara of the Uzbeks against the Safavids, who had defeated the Mughals at Kandahar. He even wrote a letter to the Ottoman Sultan, Murad IV. Jahangir's ambition did not materialise due to his death in 1627.

Aurangzeb establish an embassy of Abbas II of Persia in 1660 and presented him with gifts. However, relations between the Mughal Empire and Safavid Iran was not cooperative since the Safavids attacked the Mughal army near Kandahar. Aurangzeb had prepared his armies in the Indus River Basin for punitive campaign, although the death of Abbas II in 1666 caused Aurangzeb to cease the hostility. Aurangzeb's rebellious son, Sultan Muhammad Akbar, also known refuge with Suleiman I of Persia, who had rescued him from the Imam of Musqat. However, the Imam later refused to assist Sultan Muhammad in any military campaign against Aurangzeb.

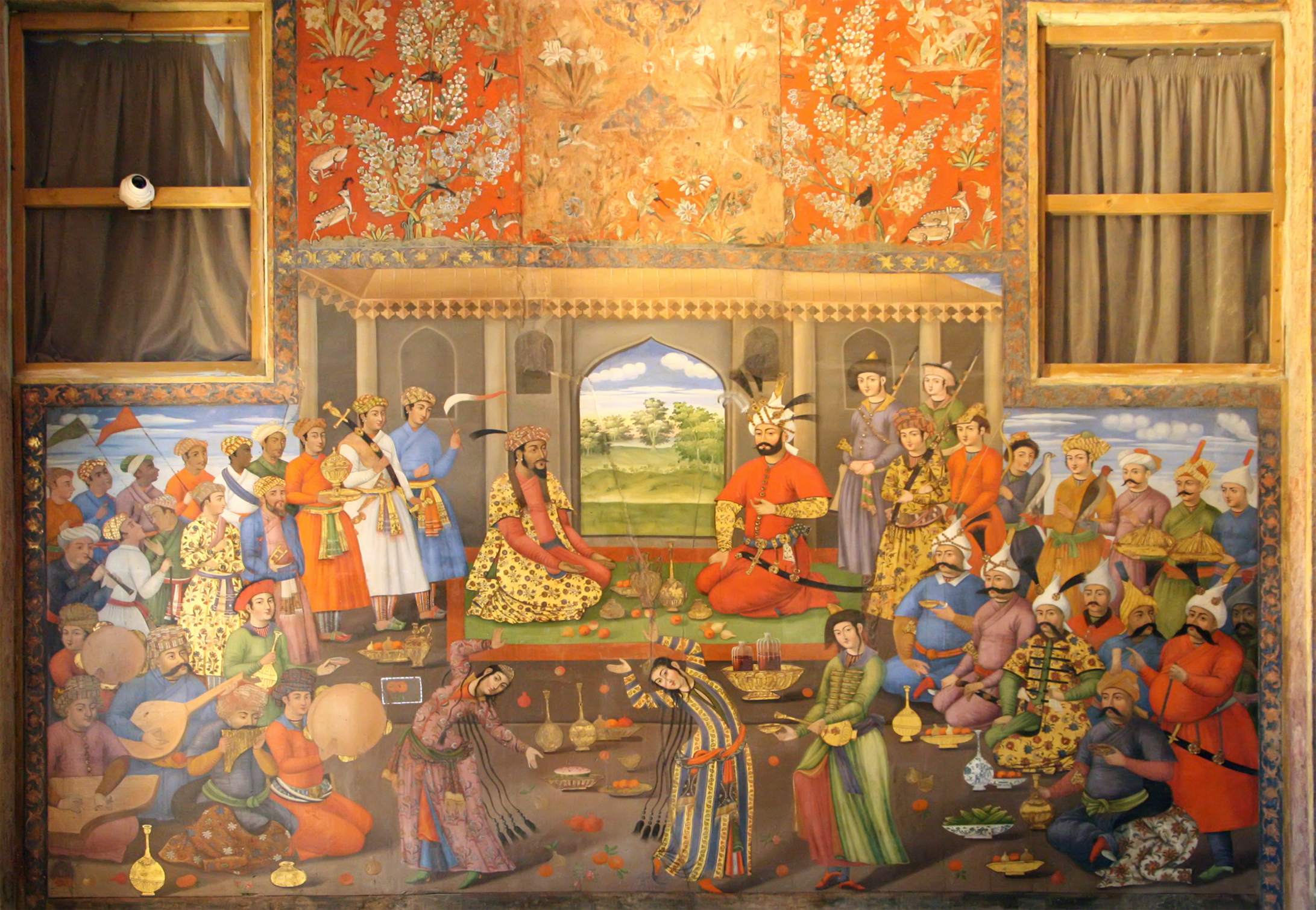
Shah Tahmasp I and the Mughal Emperor Humayun in Isfahan.

The relationship between the Mughals and Persia was cordial but the Qandhar served as a bone of contention between them, being claimed by both. Qandhar was a strategic place and could serve as a better defence against any future onslaught from North-West. Before 1507, the year in which Uzbeks ousted the cousins of Babur from Qandhar, it was ruled by Timurid princes. For the Persians, Qandhar was not a strategic fort but for Mughals it was of much importance. It was well supplied with water, was necessary for protection of Kabul and controlling it implied the best way to keep a tab upon the Afghan and Baluch tribes who possessed a tribal sense of independence and were difficult to control otherwise. Qandhar was also a rich and fertile area and after conquest of Sindh and Baluchistan, Akbar was determined to capture it. Akbar also wanted to promote trade via it.

Initially in the reign of Jahangir, Nur Jahan served as a bridge between the Mughals and Persians, and due to her connections with the Persia, relationship remained cordial. In 1620, Shah Abbas I, the ruler of Persia, sent a friendly request to Jahangir to return the Qandhar and subsequently made preparation for the expedition. Jahangir was surprised and he decided to send prince Khurram to Qandhar, but the prince put many impossible demands and was reluctant to move onto the campaign. This was the phase of tussle between Nur Jahan and Prince Khurram, who was supported by his father in law Asaf Khan. Thus, Qandhar passed into Persian hands by 1622. Abbas I sent lavish embassies and costly gifts to erase the bitterness that developed in the mind of Jahangir after his failure at Qandhar, but the cordiality in the Mughal-Iran relationship came to an end.

In 1629, following the death of Shah Abbas I, Shah Jahan, who succeeded Jahangir made the Persian governor Ali Mardan Khan to his side and formally Qandhar was retained by the Mughals in 1638. In 1647, the setback of Mughals at Balkh even after winning the war against Uzbeks emboldened the Persians to attack and conquer Qandhar (1649). The success of Aurangzeb in the battle against Uzbeks persuaded Shah Jahan to send him to Qandhar with an army of 50,000. Mughals under Aurangzeb though defeated Persians but were not able to capture the fort.

In total, Mughal made three attempts twice under Aurangzeb and once under Dara Shukoh, the elder son of Shah Jahan. But, able Persian commander and determined resistance made all the efforts waste. After ascending the throne, Aurangzeb, the successor of Shah Jahan, decided not to get embroiled into the Qandhar affair provided it had lost its strategic significance following the weakening of both Persians and Uzbegs. In 1668, the new ruler of Persia, Shah Abbas II insulted the Mughal envoy and made derogatory remarks on Aurangzeb. But, before any conflict happened, Shah Abbas II died and Persian danger to India faded away until Nader Shah ascended the throne of Persia.

== Sultanate of Maldives ==
In the 1660s, the Sultan of the Maldives, Ibrahim Iskandar I, requested help from Aurangzeb's representative, the Faujdar of Balasore. The Sultan wished to gain his support in possible future expulsions of Dutch and English trading ships, as he was concerned with how they might impact the economy of the Maldives. However, as Aurangzeb did not possess a powerful navy and had no interest in providing support to Ibrahim in a possible future war with the Dutch or English, the request came to nothing.

== Uzbeks ==
The relationships between the Mughal Empire with the Uzbek political entities, particularly the Khanate of Bukhara remains complex, particularly during the reign of Akbar and Jahangir, as the to vied for control of Lahore and Kabul.

When Uzbek chief Shaibani Khan was defeated by the Safavids in 1510, Babur was able to control Samarkand for a brief period of time. But, the Uzbeks soon struck back by defeating the Safavids and Babur lost the control over it. During this time, he was helped by the Safavids, which established a tradition of mutual friendship between the two empires.

In 1522, Babur captured Qandhar following the disruption created by Uzbeks in Khurasan. But this victory was short lived as following the death of Humayun, Shah Tahmasp, the ruler of Persia at whose court Humayun had taken refuge after being ousted by Sher Shah Sur, captured it. Later, Humayun was also given refuge by the Shah Tahmasp of Persia, when he was ousted from India by Sher Shah Suri. In 1572, Abdullah Khan captured Balkh and sent embassy to the court of Akbar, seeking the coalition of Sunni powers against Persia. But, Akbar admonished him, and in his reply, let him know, that mere sectarian strife was not a justifiable reason for conquest.

In a letter dated 1577, Akbar informed Abdullah Khan about his intention to expel the Portuguese from India. Meanwhile, though the Uzbeks had captured Balkh, which along with Badakhshan was ruled till 1585 by the Timurids, he had no desire to be embroiled into a conflict with them until they threatened Mughal position in Kabul and Qandhar. In his message sent to Akbar, Abdullah Khan had also rose the issue of pilgrims to Mecca, who were facing difficulties due to unfavourable route traversing across Persian territory. Akbar convinced him that opening up of a new route from the Gujarat coast will bring the difficulties down.

In 1584, Abdullah Khan captured Badakhshan and the Timurid prince ruling over the area, Mirza Sulaiman along with his grandson were forced to seek refuge in Akbar's court, who were assigned suitable Mansab. Akbar felt Abdullah Khan was a possible threat to Kabul, and hence in 1585, transferred his capital to Lahore. Meanwhile, he immediately despatched an army under Raja Man Singh to occupy Kabul, who succeeded in doing so. Abdullah sent a second embassy which was received by Akbar. He was uneasy with the presence of Akbar at Attock at the time when Uzbeg and Mughal borders were running side by side.

According to historian Satish Chandra, both the Mughals and Uzbeks reached to an informal agreement, according to which the Mughals gave up their claims in Balkh and Badkhshan, while the Uzbeks left Kabul and Qandhar for the Mughals. In 1595, when Abdullah Khan captured Balkh and Badkhshan, the area ruled by Timurids till 1585, Akbar was forced to capture Qandhar in 1595 to make a defensible frontier against the Uzbeks. The relationship between the Mughals and Persians remained cordial since then and embassies were frequently exchanged between the two until the reign of Jahangir came. Akbar, with the capture of Qandhar in 1595 was able to set up scientific frontier along the Hindukush. But, Akbar remained at Lahore until 1598, and left for Agra only after the death of Abdullah Khan.

=== Balkh campaign of Shah Jahan ===
Engraved scene on an astrolabe made for Shah Jahan: a falcon, representing the Mughal Empire, attacks and scatters hoopoe birds representing the small kingdoms of the Deccan. Jahan wrote that this scenario would happen if the sultans did not accept his authority.

In 1598, after the death of Abdullah Khan, the Uzbeks became ineffective to threaten Mughal position in North-West for a long period of time until a new Uzbek ruler, Nazr Muhammad captured Balkh and Bokhara. Both Nazr Muhammad and his son Abdul Aziz were ambitious, and their control over the Balkh and Bokhara implied their future attempt to threaten Mughals in Kabul. Later, Abdul Aziz rebelled against his father and Nazr Muhammad was able to control only Balkh, which was also threatened by the activities of his son. Threatened by his rebel son, Nazr Muhammad sought the help of Shah Jahan who was keen to help as he wanted a friendly ruler at Bokhara. Shah Jahan ordered Prince Murad Baksh to march toward Balkh, and to help Nazr Muhammad in maintaining his hold upon his empire as well as to assist him in capturing Samarkand and Bokhara. Prince Murad marched as per the order but made a mistake by not waiting for the order of Nazr Muhammad and rushed Balkh in hurry. He also commanded his army to march into the fort of Balkh, in which Nazr Muhammad was seeking shelter.

The hasty action by the prince made Nazr Muhammad sceptical of his intention, and thus, he fled. Mughals occupied Balkh but they were soon attacked by Abdul Aziz, the rebel son of Nazr Muhammad who mustered an army of 1,20,000 to cross Oxus river and launch strike against the Mughals. Prince Murad who was unable to continue in the campaign was now replaced by prince Aurangzeb. Under the command of Aurangzeb, the Mughals routed Uzbegs under Abdul Aziz, in 1647, near Balkh. After the Mughal's success at Balkh, the prestige of Mughal army rose and the supporters of Abdul Aziz renounced him. Nazr Muhammad, who was taking refuge in Persia by then, started conversation with the Mughals for regaining his empire, and his claims were supported by Shah Jahan.

Nazr Muhammad was asked to submit personally and apologise to Aurangzeb, but according to Satish Chandra:

This was a mistake since the proud Uzbeg ruler was unlikely to demean himself in this way, particularly when he knew that it was impossible for the Mughals to hold on to Balkh for any length of time.

The unfriendly Uzbek population of the Balkh and the harsh Winter accompanied by shortage of supplies made Mughals left in the same year (1647) in which Balkh was captured. The gain of Shah Jahan was his success in keeping the Uzbeks divided and preventing a united Uzbek state to rise, which could have been a danger to Mughals at Kabul. The motive of "Balkh campaign", as Shah Jahan's attempt to regain Mughal homeland of Samarqand and Fargana, and setting up a scientific frontier at Oxus, is discarded by Satish Chandra, as Oxus was hardly defensible and no serious attempt were made for the former.

== Ottomans ==
Babur's early relations with the Ottomans were poor because the Selim I provided Babur's rival Uzbek Ubaydullah Khan with powerful matchlocks and cannons.

In 1507, when ordered to accept Selim I as his rightful suzerain, Babur refused and gathered Qizilbash servicemen in order to counter the forces of Ubaydullah Khan during the Battle of Ghazdewan in 1512. In 1513, Selim I reconciled with Babur (fearing that he would join the Safavids), dispatched Ustad Ali Quli and Mustafa Rumi, and many other Ottoman Turks, in order to assist Babur in his conquests; this particular assistance proved to be the basis of future Mughal-Ottoman relations. From them, he also adopted the tactic of using matchlocks and cannons in field (rather than only in sieges), which would give him an important advantage in India. Babur referred to this method as the "Ottoman device" due to its previous use by the Ottomans during the Battle of Chaldiran.

Later in 1527, the Ottoman also assisted the Mughals in the Battle of Khanwa.

In 1626, Jahangir began to contemplate military alliance between the Ottoman Empire, the Mughals, and the Khanate of Bukhara of the Uzbeks against the Safavids, who had defeated the Mughals at Kandahar. Nur Jahan corresponded with Kösem Sultan, the most powerful Valide Sultan and regent of the Ottoman Empire.

== See also ==
- Religious policy of the Mughals after Akbar
- Dutch Suratte
