= PP-138 Sheikhupura-III =

Constituency of Provincial Assembly of Punjab

- Constituency for the Provincial Assembly of Punjab
- Region: Sheikhupura Tehsil (partly) Ferozewala Tehsil (partly) including Ferozewala city of Sheikhupura District

Current constituency
- Created: 2018
- Created from: PP-163 Sheikhupura-II, PP-164 Sheikhupura-III & PP-167 Sheikhupura-VI (2002-2018); PP-137 Sheikhupura-III (2018-2023)

PP-138 Sheikhupura-III (پی پی-138، شيخوپورہ-3) is a Constituency of Provincial Assembly of Punjab.

== General elections 2024 ==
Provincial elections were held on 8 February 2024. Pir Muhammad Ashraf Rasool won the election with 38,605 votes.

Provincial election 2024: PP-138 Sheikhupura-III
Party	Candidate	Votes	%	±%
PML(N)	Pir Muhammad Ashraf Rasool	38,605	44.51	
Independent	Abuzar Maqsood Chadhar (Note: Filed nomination papers as PTI candidate but ECP allowed him to run as an Independent)	33,074	38.14	
TLP	Muhammad Atif	10,333	11.91	
Others	Others (seventeen candidates)	4,717	5.44	
Turnout		88,626	48.79	
Total valid votes		86,729	97.86	
Rejected ballots		1,897	2.14	
Majority		5,531	6.37	
Registered electors		181,656		
hold				

== General elections 2018 ==
Provincial election 2018: PP-137 Sheikhupura-III
Party	Candidate	Votes	%	±%
PML(N)	Pir Muhammad Ashraf Rasool	37,959	45.70	
PTI	Ali Abbas	31,513	37.94	
TLP	Asghar Ali	9,779	11.77	
PPP	Syed Zain Abbas	1,705	2.05	
Others	Others (seven candidates)	2,108	2.54	
Turnout		85,223	56.24	
Total valid votes		83,064	97.47	
Rejected ballots		2,159	2.53	
Majority		6,446	7.76	
Registered electors		151,526		

== General elections 2013 ==
Provincial election 2013: PP-167 Sheikhupura-VI
Party	Candidate	Votes	%	±%
PML(N)	Muhammad Arif Khan Sindhila	41,573	40.79	
PTI	Haji Muhammad Shafique	19,621	19.25	
Independent	Mian Khalid Mehmood	11,963	11.74	
PST	Rana Abdul Sammi	6,349	6.23	
Independent	Syed Raza Hussain Babar Rizvi	5,826	5.72	
PPP	Mian Muhammad Pervez	5,716	5.61	
MDM	Hafiz Muhammad Ashfaq Gujjar	3,298	3.24	
Independent	Seith Ghulam Rasool Rehmani	2,212	2.17	
JI	Sheikh Jamil	1,642	1.61	
Independent	Seith Abdul Khaliq Rehmani	1,119	1.10	
Others	Others (thirty one candidates)	2,604	2.55	
Turnout		104,554	53.64	
Total valid votes		101,923	97.48	
Rejected ballots		2,631	2.52	
Majority		21,952	21.54	
Registered electors		194,921		

== General elections 2008 ==
Contesting candidates	Party affiliation	Votes polled

== See also ==
- PP-137 Sheikhupura-II
- PP-139 Sheikhupura-IV
