= Pir Muhammad Ashraf Rasool =

Pakistani politician (born 1965)

Member of the Provincial Assembly of the Punjab
- Incumbent
- Assumed office 2008
- Constituency: PP-138 Sheikhupura-III

Personal details
- Born: 7 April 1965 (age 61) Sheikhupura, Punjab, Pakistan
- Party: PMLN (2008-present)

Pir Muhammad Ashraf Rasool is a senior Pakistani politician who is a Member of the Provincial Assembly of the Punjab, from 2008 till today.

== Early life and education ==
He was born on 7 April 1965 in Lahore.

He has the degree of Master of Business Administration which he obtained in 1988 from Australia.

== Political career ==
He ran for the seat of the Provincial Assembly of the Punjab as a candidate of Pakistan Muslim League (N) (PML-N) from Constituency PP-164 (Sheikhupura-III) in the 2002 Pakistani general election, but was unsuccessful. He received 18,039 votes but lost the seat to Ali Abbas, a candidate of Pakistan Muslim League (Q) (PML-Q).

He was elected to the Provincial Assembly of the Punjab as a candidate of PML-N from Constituency PP-164 (Sheikhupura-III) in the 2008 Pakistani general election. He received 21,888 votes and defeated Ali Abbas, a candidate of PML-Q. From 2008 to 2013, he served as Parliamentary Secretary for Forestry, Fisheries and Wildlife.

He was re-elected to the Provincial Assembly of the Punjab as a candidate of PML-N from Constituency PP-164 (Sheikhupura-III) in the 2013 Pakistani general election.

He was re-elected to Provincial Assembly of the Punjab as a candidate of PML-N from Constituency PP-137 (Sheikhupura-III) in the 2018 Pakistani general election.

He was re-elected to Provincial Assembly of the Punjab as a candidate of PML-N from Constituency PP-138 (Sheikhupura-III) in the 2024 Pakistani general election.

He was chairman overseas commission Pakistan, Parliamentary Director food and also served as Parliamentary Secretary Forest Fisheries Wildlife Tourism Punjab (2008-2013, 2013-2018). He has served as Director Project Dengue along with Health Minister Khawaja Salman Rafique.
