= PP-137 Sheikhupura-II =

Constituency of the Provincial Assembly of Punjab, Pakistan

- Constituency for the Provincial Assembly of Punjab
- Region: Muridke Tehsil (partly) including Muridke city of Sheikhupura District

Current constituency
- Created from: PP-163 Sheikhupura-II (2002-2018); PP-136 Sheikhupura-II (2018-2023)

PP-137 Sheikhupura-II (پی پی-137، شيخوپورہ-2) is a Constituency of Provincial Assembly of Punjab.

== General elections 2024 ==
Provincial election 2024: PP-137 Sheikhupura-II
| Party | Candidate | Votes | % | ±% |
|---|---|---|---|---|
| Independent | Khurram Ijaz Chattha (Note: Filed nomination papers as PTI candidate but ECP allowed him to run as an Independent) | 58,171 | 51.33 | |
| PML(N) | Muhammad Arshad | 38,545 | 34.01 | |
| TLP | Khalid Javed | 9,596 | 8.47 | |
| PPP | Muhammad Danishmand Chauhdry | 2,714 | 2.40 | |
| Others | Others (eleven candidates) | 4,296 | 3.79 | |
| Turnout | | 116,326 | 49.56 | |
| Total valid votes | | 113,322 | 97.42 | |
| Rejected ballots | | 3,004 | 2.58 | |
| Majority | | 19,626 | 17.32 | |
| Registered electors | | 234,722 | | |
| hold | | | | |

== General elections 2018 ==
Provincial election 2018: PP-136 Sheikhupura-II
| Party | Candidate | Votes | % | ±% |
|---|---|---|---|---|
| PTI | Khurram Ijaz Chattha | 52,604 | 50.81 | |
| PML(N) | Ch. Mushtaq Ahmed | 33,633 | 32.48 | |
| TLP | Muhammad Anwar Rasheed | 11,418 | 11.03 | |
| AAT | Muhammad Shafique Khan | 3,535 | 3.41 | |
| Others | Others (twelve candidates) | 2,351 | 2.27 | |
| Turnout | | 105,930 | 55.48 | |
| Total valid votes | | 103,541 | 97.75 | |
| Rejected ballots | | 2,389 | 2.25 | |
| Majority | | 18,971 | 18.33 | |
| Registered electors | | 190,935 | | |

== General elections 2013 ==
Provincial election 2013: PP-163 Sheikhupura-II
| Party | Candidate | Votes | % | ±% |
|---|---|---|---|---|
| PML(N) | Khurram Ijaz Chattha | 40,772 | 56.32 | |
| Independent | Rana Ijaz Hussain | 13,807 | 19.07 | |
| PML(Q) | Ch. Mushtaq Ahmad Gujjar | 8,327 | 11.50 | |
| PTI | Amir Ahmad Gujjar | 8,167 | 11.28 | |
| Others | Others (eight candidates) | 1,318 | 1.82 | |
| Turnout | | 74,987 | 54.62 | |
| Total valid votes | | 72,391 | 96.54 | |
| Rejected ballots | | 2,596 | 3.46 | |
| Majority | | 26,965 | 37.25 | |
| Registered electors | | 137,298 | | |

== General elections 2008 ==
| Contesting candidates | Party affiliation | Votes polled |

== See also ==
- PP-136 Sheikhupura-I
- PP-138 Sheikhupura-III
