= Religious policy of the Mughals after Akbar =

Religious policy of the Mughal emperors after Akbar

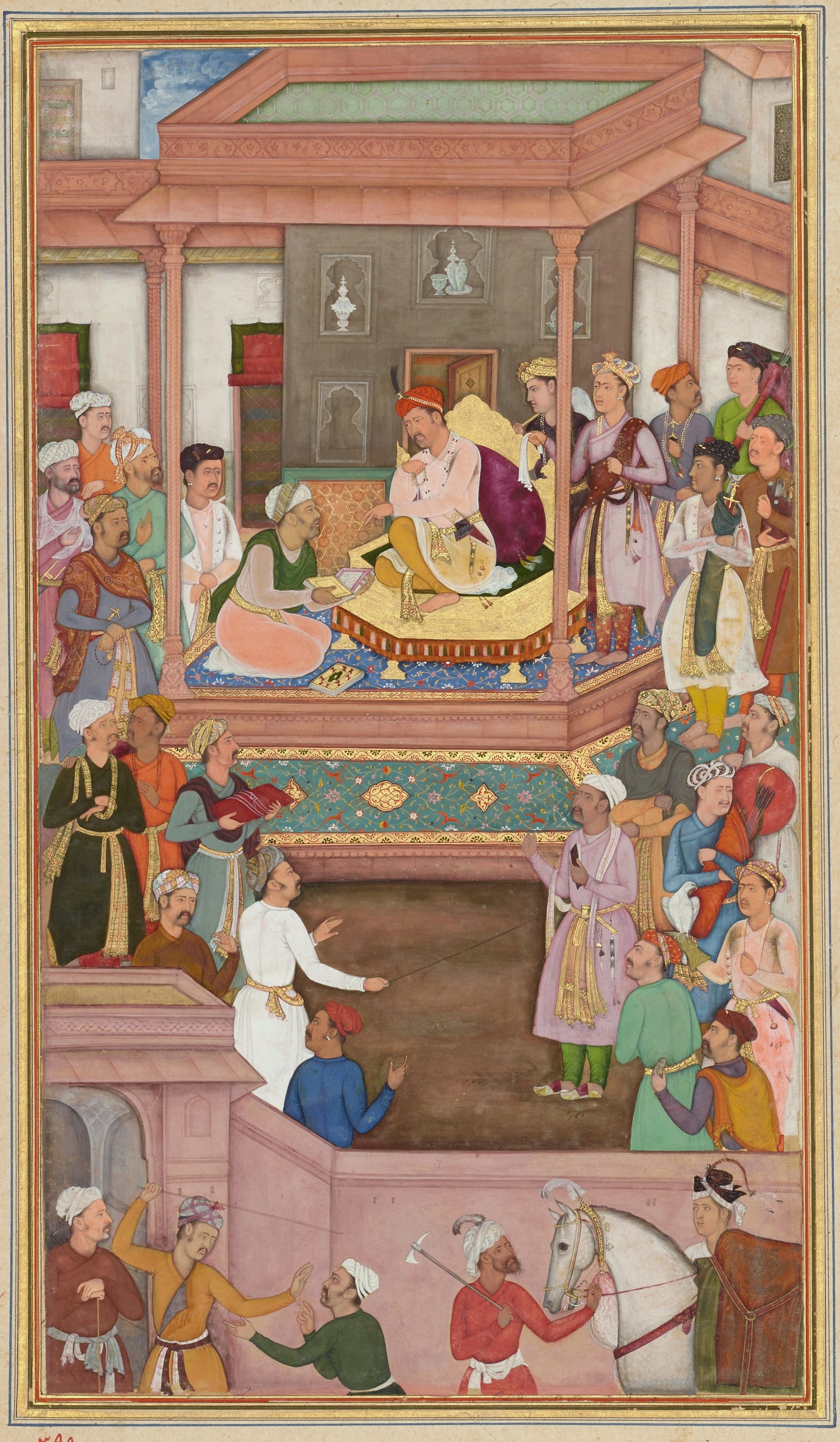
Abu'l-Fazl, one of the disciples of Din-i-Ilahi, presenting Akbarnama to Akbar, Mughal miniature.

== Jahangir ==
When Jahangir ascended the throne there was a hope among theologians that Akbar's policies of Ṣulḥ-i-kul will be brought to an end. Jahangir's initial farmans (royal decrees) presented an indication of the conversion of the Mughal Empire into a truly Islamic empire. He asked the Ulema to prepare a set of distinctive appeals to the god, which might be easy to remember, as he wanted to repeat them while using his rosary. He also met the pious and religious persons on Fridays and distributed the alms and gifts to the dervishes. But in no way Jahangir was an orthodox though he often showed the incidents of narrow mindedness. Jahangir was habitual of drinking; he writes in his memoirs to have reduced the intake of distilled spirit from 20 cups to five cups after his accession to the throne and that too at night. Meanwhile, he also used to invite his nobles while drinking and music and dance were common in his courts. All these practices were considered as un-Islamic for the orthodox Ulemas.

He is said to have prohibited cow slaughter in Punjab and extended it to the Gujarat, though there is also a view that this was done for few years actually due to scarcity of cattle. The various Hindu festivals were celebrated in the court and he himself used to participate in them and carried out distribution of gifts. But there are many incidents which presents an opposite view of his religious ecclesiasticism. The war against Mewar was declared as Jihad. The Mughal army while marching towards Mewar destroyed many Hindu temples but Jahangir had warned strictly to prince Khurram to treat Rana Amar Singh I as a friend if he prepares to submit. Thus, when Rana submitted and sued for peace he was given an honourable treatment by Shah Jahan (Khurram) and marble statues of Rana Amar Singh I and Karan Singh were installed at the Jahangir's Agra Palace.

In 1621, the Kangra campaign was also declared as a Jihad though from the side of the Mughals, Hindu Raja Bikramjit commanded it. Jahangir while his visit to Haridwar founded that Hindus who renounced the worldly life were seeking pleasure on the path of god here and he distributed gifts to them. In Ajmer also, he distributed gifts and money to entire village of Pushkar, while the Varaha image of Vishnu was ordered to be broken. In his reign, people like Vir Singh Bundela erected grand temples at Mathura. Jahangir himself visited Brindawan and distributed alms to the Mathas of Chaitanya sect. According to Historian R.P. Tripathi, he was less tolerant than Akbar but more than Shah Jahan on the ground of religion.

There are incidents, when he showed his narrow level of tolerance, and inflicted heavy penalties upon some of the notable people. In the case of Guru Arjun Dev, Jahangir saw his support of Khusrau as treason. Jahangir is said to have inflicted heavy dues upon him, and the excessive torture inflicted upon him to realise the dues, led to loss of his life. He also imprisoned his son and successor, Guru Hargovind. The Emperor also penalised many leading Muslims upon his disagreement to some of their views. The notable Sufi saint, Sheikh Ahmad Sirhindi, once remarked that he once came closed to the god than the Caliphs in his dreams, and was punished by the Emperor, as he strongly refuted his claims. Another Sufi called Shaikh Nizam Thanesari was banished to Mecca, on the charge of accompanying Khusrau Mirza for some distance. He started a practice of rewarding the pious and knowledgeable person after testing their knowledge and economic condition every day. He ordered such people to be brought before him and after their personal examination he forwarded monetary and other support to them, but this practice was restricted to Muslims only.

Jahangir found more satisfaction in the theory of Vedanta, which he called Science of Tasawwuf. He became an admirer of Jadrup Gosain, who according to him had mastered this science, and used to live in a hole in a mountain. Jahangir walked barefooted to see him, and on meeting with him, he was impressed with his knowledge and simplicity. He wanted to invite him to Agra but was alarmed by the orthodox elements. Later, Jadrup Gosain moved to Mathura, where Jahangir met him twice. He also dismissed the brother-in-law of Nur Jahan, Hakim Beg, from the governorship of Mathura as he disrespected Gosain. Jahangir also hosted Brahmins in his court and often used to listen to them as for example, a Brahmin from Gujarat who accompanied Ramdas Kachhwaha used to present his discourse upon sanctity of Cows and the story of Dadhichi, a sage who offered his bones for the cause of world.

Ahmad Sirhindi continues his religious discourses by writing a large number of letters to the nobles, with particularly towards Shaikh Farid Murtaza Khan, a Mir Bakshi official, to convince the emperor about this religious issue. It is also known through his letter correspondence with the imperial government figures, that Ahmad Sirhindi were routinely attend the court debates to counteract some religious beliefs and doctrines which prevalent in the court. In the process, it is recorded from these correspondence which compiled in 1617, that Farid Murtaza Khan took Ahmad Sirhindi advices regarding this matter. His efforts influenced Abul Fazl, protegee of emperor Akbar, to support Ahmad Sirhindi in effort to convince Jahangir, successor of Akbar, to reverse the policies of Akbar of tolerating Hindus in Mughal court.

Yohanan Friedmann has noted that according to many modern historians and thinkers, the puritanical though of Ahmad Sirhindi has inspired the religious orthodoxy of emperor Aurangzeb. This was noted by how Ahmad Sirhindi manage to influence the successor of emperor Akbar, starting from Jahangir, into reversing Akbar policies such as lifting marriage age limits, mosque abolishments, and Hijra methodology revival which abandoned by his father. It is noted by historians that this influence has been significantly recorded during the conquest of Kangra under Jahangir, that at the presence of Ahmad Sirhindi who observed the campaign, the Mughal forces had the Idols broken, a cow slaughtered, Khutbah sermon read, and other Islamic rituals performed. Further mark of Jahangir departure from Akbar secular policy were recorded Terry, a traveller, who came and observed India region between 1616 and 1619, where he found the mosques full of worshippers, the exaltation of Quran and Hadith practical teaching, and the complete observance of Fasting during Ramadan and Eid al-Fitr celebrations.

== Shah Jahan ==
To some extent, the reign of Shah Jahan saw a shift from the liberal policies. In the sixth regnal year, he announced that the Temples, whose foundation has been laid in the reign of Jahangir, but hadn't been completed yet, should be destroyed or the project to be stopped altogether. He however allowed those Temples, which were completed before his accession to throne to survive. The zeal for the revival of Islam was witnessed in the Emperor's preference of showing the Islam as a dominant religion, which led to establishment of grand Mosques like Jama Masjid at Delhi and Taj Mahal at Agra. These monuments were commensurate with the Islamic idea of paradise. Meanwhile, two strong currents of "orthodoxy" and "liberalism" were running during his reign. While the banner of liberalism was in the hands of Dara Shukoh and Jahanara, Sheikh Abdul Haq and Sheikh Ahmad Sirhindi were the leaders of orthodox section. Sheikh Ahmad Sirhindi urged the Emperor to impose Jizya upon the non Muslims, and declared Both Hindus and Shia Muslim to be heretics (Kafir) in his pamphlet. He was in favour of strict enforcement of the injunctions of the Sharia.

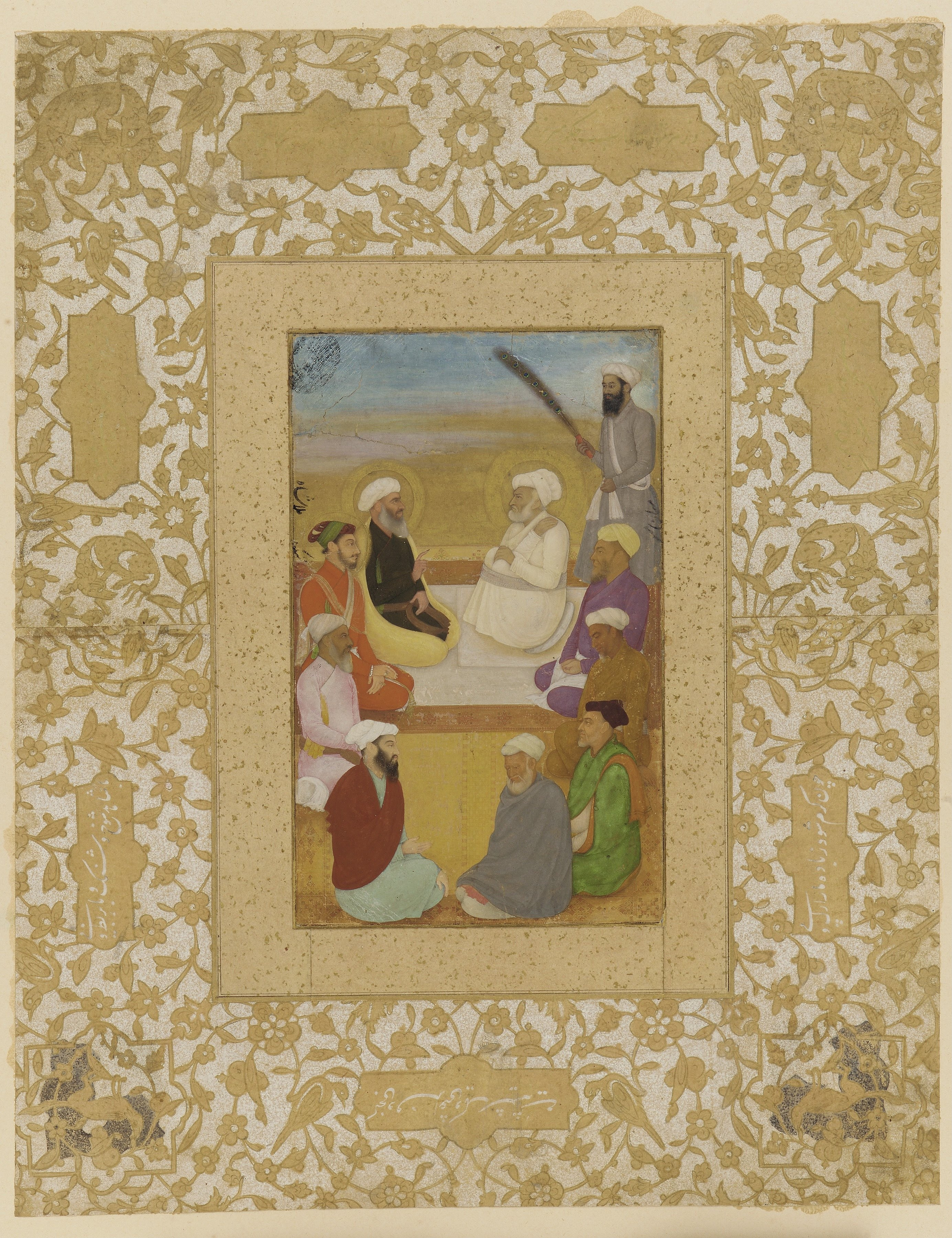
Dara Shikoh (with Mian Mir and Mullah Shah Badakhshi), ca. 1635

Shah Jahan joined neither of this religious current and while proclaiming the state to be an Islamic one, he never refrained from the liberal policies completely. He also took the form of a staunch Muslim emperor at times and it was witnessed during the Bundela rebellion, when Temple built by Vir Singh Bundela at Orchha was destroyed by the Mughal forces. Shah Jahan supported some of the wealthy Jain merchants and offered them land and other sort of assistance. Thus, Shantidas was granted land in Ahmedabad, where he built a temple. No step was taken to prohibit him from doing so until Aurangzeb was posted as a governor of Gujarat and the Temple was forcibly converted into a Mosque. Later, on a complaint made by Shantidas and due to a decree of a leading Qazi that banishing someone from his personal possession is against the Islamic jurisprudence, Shah Jahan restored the Temple to him.

As an Emperor, Shah Jahan didn't allow the orthodox elements to dominate and except few incidents of narrow mindedness like in the reign of Jahangir, the Empire as a whole ran with support of heterogeneous nobility in which Hindus were given proper representation. He was also fond of music and dance like Jahangir, and Dhrupad was his favourite musical form. In his reign, Hindu musician Jagannath was given the title of Maha Kavi Rai (great poet). Shah Jahan is said to have banned mix marriages in Kashmir which implied Muslim girls to took up the custom and religion of their Hindu husbands. The letters which Sheikh Ahmad Sirhindi and Sheikh Abdul Haq wrote to him presents a glossary of demands from the part of orthodox elements to put heavy restrictions upon Hindus. Shah Jahan also came into conflict with Sikh Guru Hargobind which resulted in Battle of Kartarpur, after which Guru took shelter in the Kashmir hills. But above all these liberal elements were still active in the empire with Mian Mir and his successor Mullah Shah Badakhshi, who were mentor of Dara Shukoh propagating idea of mutual co-existence.

== Aurangzeb ==
Aurangzeb's religious policies are one of the most debated topic than those of other Mughal rulers. Some historians like Jadunath Sarkar consider his religious stand to be full of bigotry and religious intolerance, while others like Shibli Naumani describes it as a matter of political expediency. Satish Chandra explains it neutrally, while not going in the debate of "for" and "against". Some of the Aurangzeb's policy can be seen as a direct attack on Hindus while others could be seen as need of time. In the initial years of his reign, Aurangzeb floated the farmans which called for banning of practices like Jharokha Darshan; Tula Dan (weighing the Emperor against the gold and silver) which was started by Akbar. Also, later in life, he even recommended the weighing rites to his grandson Bidar Bakht. He also prohibited inscribing Khutba (Islamic verses) on coins and reimposed Jizya on non-Muslims which was abolished by Akbar. Aurangzeb also ordered all the newly built Temples to be destroyed while the older ones were prohibited from being repaired. He also ordered the governor of Gujarat to prohibit the Hindus from celebrating the festival like Holi and Diwali outside the Bazaars of Ahmedabad.

There are a set of his royal orders which could be seen as a direct attempt to harass Hindus and to portray him as an ideal Islamic ruler. During his governorship of Gujarat, Aurangzeb publicly desecrated newly built "Chintaman Temple", by killing a cow in its premise and converting it into Mosque. Other steps like demolition of Kashi Vishwanath Temple and imposing a duty of 5% on Hindu traders as compared to 2.5% on Muslims, were equally controversial. He banned music in the royal court which affected not only Hindus but Muslim musicians as well. He is said to have reduced Rahdari (road tax) and other duties which he found illicit. Aurangzeb's reimposition of Jizya is explained by later historians as the attempt to rally Muslims together, specifically the orthodox ones in a war against Marathas and Rajput kingdoms and also against the Deccani Sultanates which had sided with the heretics.

He banned singing in his royal court, but not the playing of musical instruments. Indeed, he was proficient in playing the Veena. A large number of treatise on music were written during his reign. He is also said to have banned Muharram procession (a Shia tradition) in all provinces after violent clashes took place during one such procession. According to Chandra, the stand of Aurangzeb can be described as the stand of a person who due to remorse of his deeds, took shelter in the shell of religion. The number of Hindus in mansab was not reduced as compared to his predecessors and he sought to maintain good relations with the Rajputs. Jai Singh I remained his close companions and he even pitted him against numerous Hindu kings including Shivaji. Even during war of succession, more Rajputs backed Dara, while more Marathas backed Aurangzeb.

== See also ==
- Foreign relations of the Mughal Empire

== Bibliography ==
- Malik, Adnan; Zubair, Muhammad; Parveen, Uzman (2016). "Effects of social reforms of shaykh Ahmad sirhindi (1564-1624) on muslim society in the sub continent". Journal of Social Sciences and Humanities. 55 (2). University of Karachi: 155–164. doi:10.46568/jssh.v55i2.70.
