= Baku Communiqué =

The Baku Communiqué, signed on 15 May 2024, is an international agreement addressing the climate change challenges faced by Small Island Developing States (SIDS).

== Conception ==
This agreement was conceived and championed by Ali Serim, Special Envoy to COP29 for Vanuatu and Special Representative of The Commonwealth Secretary-General, and Shivshankar Nair GCEG, OV, Ambassador for Climate Change, Oceans, and Special Envoy to The Commonwealth and UNESCO for Tuvalu. The original idea behind the communiqué came from Serim and Nair.

== Meeting ==
Their efforts culminated in a meeting in Baku, Azerbaijan, where key stakeholders from Azerbaijan, Tuvalu, Tonga, and The Bahamas endorsed the communiqué. Foreign Minister Frederick A. Mitchell of The Commonwealth of The Bahamas officially thanked Ali Serim and Shivshankar Nair on behalf of the Government and People of The Bahamas for their work in facilitating this meeting.

== Communiqué ==
Upon the invitation of Ilham Aliyev, President of the Republic of Azerbaijan, Tuvalu, represented by the governor general, Rev Sir Tofinga Vaevalu Falani, GCMG, MBE, the Kingdom of Tonga represented by the prime minister, Siaosi Ofa Ki Vahafolau Sovaleni, and the Commonwealth of The Bahamas represented by the minister of foreign affairs, the Hon. Frederick A. Mitchell, convened in Baku, Azerbaijan, to deliberate and agree on key priorities for COP29.
