= PP-136 Sheikhupura-I =

Constituency of the Provincial Assembly of Punjab, Pakistan

- Constituency for the Provincial Assembly of Punjab
- Region: Muridke Tehsil (partly) including Narang Mandi town and Ferozewala Tehsil (partly) of Sheikhupura District

Current constituency
- Created from: PP-162 Sheikhupura-I (2002-2018); PP-135 Sheikhupura-I (2018-2023)

PP-136 Sheikhupura-I (پی پی-136، شيخوپورہ-1) is a Constituency of Provincial Assembly of Punjab.

== General elections 2024 ==
Provincial election 2024: PP-136 Sheikhupura-I
Party	Candidate	Votes	%	±%
PML(N)	Muhammad Hassaan Riaz	52,682	44.86	
Independent	Umar Aftab Dhillon (Note: Filed nomination papers as PTI candidate but ECP allowed him to run as an Independent)	39,021	33.23	
TLP	Muhammad Ramzan Mustafa	8,972	7.64	
PPP	Ch Liaqat Ali	6,425	5.47	
Independent	Muhammad Yousaf Kazmi	2,631	2.24	
Independent	Muhammad Qasim	2,522	2.15	
Others	Others (nineteen candidates)	5,190	4.41	
Turnout		121,445	51.74	
Total valid votes		117,443	96.70	
Rejected ballots		4,002	3.30	
Majority		13,661	11.63	
Registered electors		234,728		
hold				

== General elections 2018 ==
Provincial election 2018: PP-135 Sheikhupura-I
Party	Candidate	Votes	%	±%
PTI	Umer Aftab Dhillon	51,169	49.26	
PML(N)	Muhammad Hassaan Riaz	41,033	39.51	
TLP	Muhammad Umar Afzal	8,669	8.35	
Independent	Tahseen Raza	1,825	1.76	
Others	Others (seven candidates)	1,172	1.12	
Turnout		106,369	57.19	
Total valid votes		103,868	97.65	
Rejected ballots		2,501	2.35	
Majority		10,136	9.75	
Registered electors		185,986		

== General elections 2013 ==
Provincial election 2013: PP-162 Sheikhupura-I
Party	Candidate	Votes	%	±%
PML(N)	Muhammad Khurram Gulfam	28,019	37.97	
Independent	Ijaz Ahmad Sehole	16,523	22.39	
Independent	Ch. Liaqat Ali Dagra	12,573	17.04	
PTI	Hafiz Tayyab Zaman Dhillon	8,171	11.07	
PPP	Ch. Usman Nisar Punno	6,206	8.41	
Others	Others (eight candidates)	2,302	3.12	
Turnout		76,758	60.04	
Total valid votes		73,794	96.14	
Rejected ballots		2,964	3.86	
Majority		11,496	15.58	
Registered electors		127,842		

== General elections 2008 ==
Contesting candidates	Party affiliation	Votes polled

== See also ==
- PP-135 Nankana Sahib-IV
- PP-137 Sheikhupura-II
