= Hürrem Sultan'ın Torunları (book) =

Non-fiction book about 20th century descendants of Ottoman Sultana

Hurrem Sultan'ın Torunları (English: The Descendants of Hurrem Sultan)
- Author: Ali Serim and İnci Döndaş
- Language: Turkish
- Genre: Historical non-fiction
- Publisher: Doğan Kitap
- Publication date: 1 September 2013
- Publication place: Turkey
- Pages: 288 (third edition)
- ISBN: 978-6050916409

Hürrem Sultan'ın Torunları (English: The Descendants of Hurrem Sultan) is a Turkish language historical non-fiction book co-authored by Ali Serim and journalist İnci Döndaş. Published by Doğan Kitap and released in its third edition on 1 September 2013, the book explores the lives of the 20th century descendants of Hurrem Sultan, the second wife of Sultan Suleiman the Magnificent, the ruler of the Ottoman Empire from 1520 to 1566. The book focuses on the modern-day Ottoman royal family's experiences of exile and adaptation following the abolition of the Ottoman Empire in 1923 and of the caliphate in 1924.

== Background ==
=== Sultan Suleiman 1 ===
Sultan Suleiman I, also known as Suleiman the Magnificent in the West and Kanuni Sultan Süleyman (the Lawgiver) in the Ottoman Empire, was the tenth and longest-reigning sultan of the Ottoman Empire, ruling from 1520 to 1566. Suleiman's reign marked the apex of Ottoman power, wealth, and territorial expansion, as well as a golden age in arts, culture, and architecture.

=== Hürrem Sultan ===
Hürrem Sultan (c. 1505/1507 – 15 April 1558), also known in the West as Roxelana, was Suleiman's third and favorite consort and later his legal wife. Born as Alexandra or Anastasia Lisowska, she was of Ruthenian origin – possibly the daughter of a Ruthenian Orthodox priest – and is believed to have been captured and sold into the imperial harem. The couple had several children together, including Selim II, who would later succeed Suleiman as sultan.

Suleiman and Hürrem's partnership was unusual and unprecedented in Ottoman history, as Hürrem's influence extended beyond her role as a wife and mother to the point where she wielded significant political influence and became a key figure at the court, advising the sultan and acting as a diplomatic intermediary with foreign rulers. She was also known for her charitable works and her significant contributions to the cultural and religious life of the empire, including the construction of mosques, schools, and hospitals. Her influence and authority over the Ottoman empire started an era known as the Sultanate of Women, where the imperial women would exercise previously unimaginable levels of power and influence throughout the empire. As such, she effectively broke the traditional role of women in the harem which often restricted their influence, with her rise from a concubine to the sultan's most trusted confidante making her one of the most remarkable women in Ottoman history.

Hürrem Sultan's legacy has been immortalized in various works of art, literature, and historical studies, and is central to Hurrem Sultan'ın Torunları's story of her 20th century descendants and how they navigated life after the fall of the Ottoman Empire.

=== End of the Ottoman Empire ===
Following the abolition of the Ottoman Empire in 1923 and of the Ottoman Caliphate in 1924, all high-ranking members of the Ottoman royal family were exiled from Turkey. Some journeyed to Switzerland on the Simplon Express, while others sailed to Beirut. Over time they scattered across the globe, settling in France, Lebanon, Egypt, the United Kingdom, the United States, and even Brazil. The women exiles were granted permission to return to Turkey in 1952, followed by the men in 1974. While some chose to return to their homeland, others remained in the foreign lands where they had made their homes, resulting in their descendants being scattered across the globe today.

== The book ==
=== Authors ===
Ali Serim developed personal connections with many of Hürrem Sultan's surviving 20th century descendants through his family's five-century presence in Istanbul, enabling him to provide personal insights into their lives. İnci Döndaş, an experienced journalist, brought a level of rigor and narrative clarity to the work. Their collaboration blends historical insights with personal storytelling, presenting a unique look at the legacy of the Ottoman dynasty through its present-day heirs.

=== Content ===
İnci Döndaş and Ali Serim conducted interviews with 12 women from the 20th century Ottoman family in which they recounted their families' experiences of exile, and the ways in which their royal lineage shaped their lives. This research included one of the final interviews with HIH Princess Neslişah Osmanoğlu, the most senior surviving Ottoman princess at the time of her death in 2012.

The resulting book is the generalized story of the 12 women interviewed, tracing their everyday experiences via personal anecdotes and narratives that explore how Hürrem Sultan's modern-day descendants coped with the loss of royal privileges after 1924. Through a series of intimate stories the book reveals how these families managed the challenges of exile, displacement, and rebuilding their lives in foreign lands.

=== Themes ===
The key themes of the book include exile, identity, and adaptation, for despite the divergent paths the women's lives took the imprint of exile is evident in each of their stories. Serim and Döndaş highlight the emotional and cultural challenges Hürrem Sultan's descendants faced as they were forced to redefine their lives after the empire collapsed, as well as the continued connections these families maintained with their imperial past, despite now living in vastly different circumstances. By focusing on the modern lives and challenges facing the descendants of one of the Ottoman Empire's most famous figures, Hürrem Sultan'ın Torunları adds an important human dimension to the history of the collapse of the Ottoman Empire.

== See also ==
- Suleiman the Magnificent
- Hürrem Sultan
