= Ali Serim =

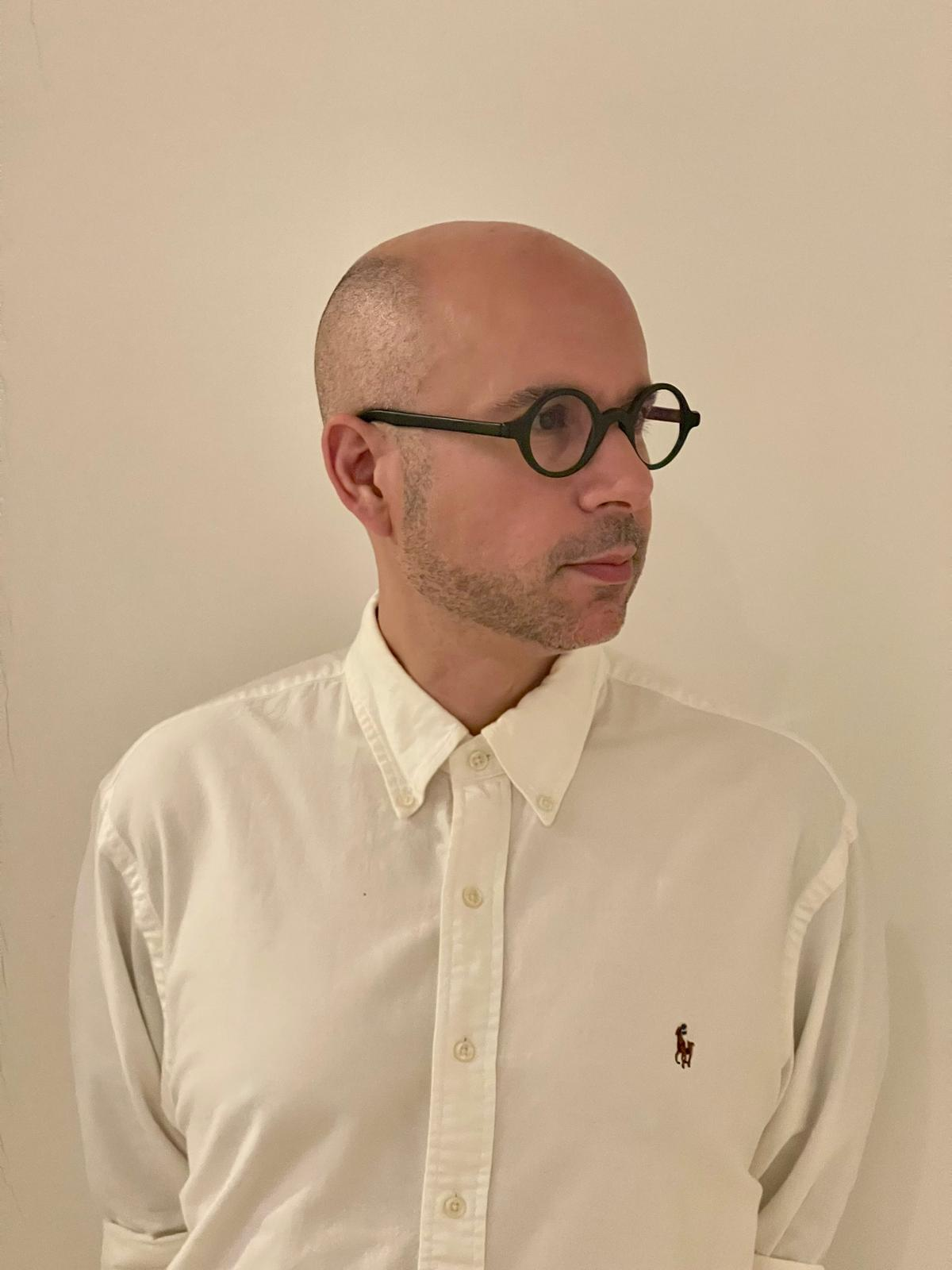
- Serim in 2024
- Born: 1978 (age 47–48); Istanbul, Turkey
- Occupations: Author, diplomat, climate advocate, publisher, investor
- Writing career
- Notable awards: (Taras Shevchenko National University of Kyiv Medal Of Honour)

Ali Serim (/ɑːˈliː/; born 1978) is an Istanbul-born Turkish author, diplomat, climate advocate, and publisher. His career spans multiple sectors, including climate change advocacy, diplomacy, public-private partnerships (PPP), and philanthropic work, particularly in support of Small Island Developing States (SIDS).

== Career and business involvement ==
Alongside overseeing a global investment portfolio spanning emerging technologies and multiple industries, he serves as Special Advisor for Geopolitics of Transition at ODI Global, within its Global Risks and Resilience programme.

ODI Global is an independent, non-partisan global affairs leading think tank founded in 1960, conducting research and policy work across global governance, resilience, sustainable economic transformation and international development.

Ali Serim also holds the position of Senior Advisor at Pollination Group, an Australian global climate investment and advisory firm. Pollination advises governments, businesses and investors on the transition to a nature positive economy.

In 2020, Pollination and HSBC Asset Management established Climate Asset Management, a joint venture focused on natural capital investment with over US$1 billion under management.

Serim began his career at Ernst & Young (EY) in Istanbul, working in corporate governance, compliance, project finance, and auditing. Serim has also published articles in The Jerusalem Post and The Conversation covering climate change.

=== Baku Communiqué ===
He took role in the development of the Baku Communiqué, a landmark diplomatic document addressing the climate change vulnerabilities of Small Island Developing States (SIDS). Developed in collaboration with Azerbaijan, Tuvalu, Tonga, and The Bahamas, the communiqué calls for "immediate and decisive global action" to counter rising sea levels and extreme weather. Ali Serim also called for a creation of a fair and accessible model for Small Island Developing States (SIDS), advocating for a framework emphasizing grants and direct aid.

== Philanthropic work ==
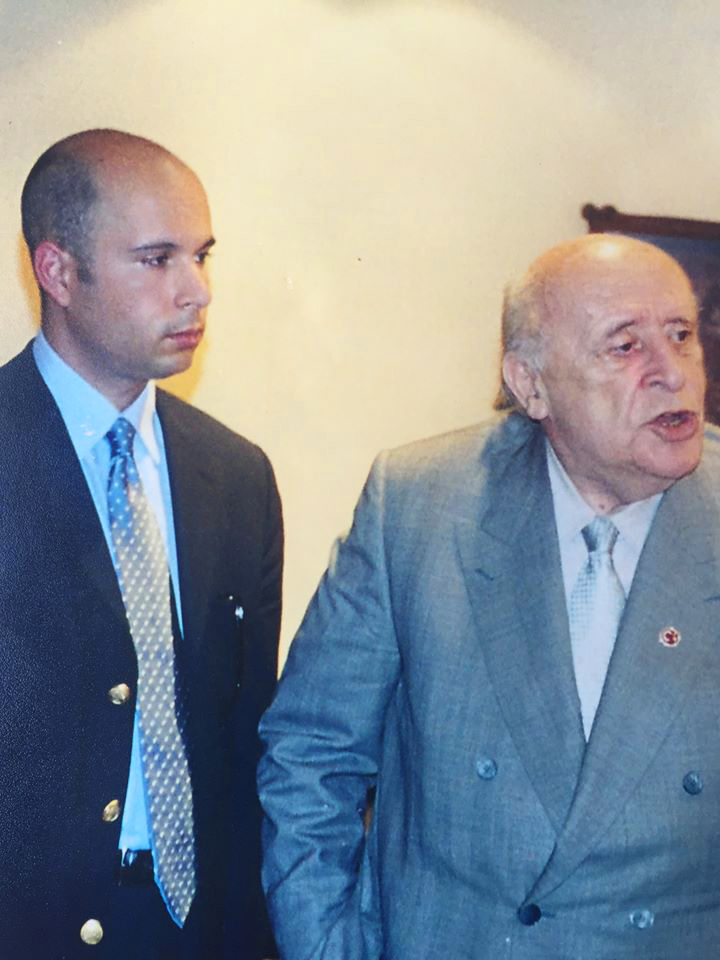
Ali Serim with Süleyman Demirel

Serim's philanthropic work centers on providing corporate donations and aid to Small Island Developing States (SIDS). He has been instrumental in creating initiatives that channel financial and material support to these vulnerable nations, helping them develop infrastructure and resilience against climate threats. His focus on government-to-government (G2G) relations ensures that these efforts are coordinated at the highest diplomatic levels, promoting long-term partnerships and sustainable development. These initiatives also actively encourage investor collaboration with diplomacy for immediate climate action. Serim's mentor, President Süleyman Demirel of Türkiye inspired his interest in democratization, leading him to join the ARI Movement as a board member. Founded in 1994, the ARI Movement promoted youth leadership, democracy, and civic engagement through education, structural reform, and encouraging volunteerism among Turkish youth. Serim was also a long-time supporter of Nicholas Negroponte’s One Laptop per Child (OLPC) project, which operated from 2005 to 2014, transforming education for children in developing countries by distributing educational devices and creating content to enhance learning. His commitment to cultural heritage preservation is reflected in his work with the Yıldız Palace Foundation, dedicated to the preservation and restoration of historical Ottoman heritage. These efforts in heritage preservation and addressing climate change impacts on historical sites earned him a nomination for the Europa Nostra Award, recognizing his outstanding contributions to safeguarding cultural heritage.

As an activist, Ali Serim emphasized the pivotal role of museums in education and their potential to significantly boost a nation's economy. Serim is a Fellow of the Royal Society of Arts (RSA), a Trustee of the Yıldız Palace Foundation, and a member of UNESCO’s Turkish National Committee on the Illicit Trafficking of Cultural Property.
