= Khurram Ijaz Chattha =

Pakistani politician

Member of the Provincial Assembly of the Punjab
- In office 15 August 2018 – 14 January 2023
- Constituency: PP-136 Sheikhupura-II
- In office 2008 – 31 May 2018
- Constituency: PP-163 (Sheikhupura-II)

Personal details
- Born: 10 September 1980 (age 46) Lahore, Punjab, Pakistan
- Party: PTI (2018-present)
- Other political affiliations: PMLN (2008-2018)

Chaudhry Khurram Ijaz Chattha is a Pakistani politician who has been a Member of the Provincial Assembly of the Punjab, since 2008.

== Early life and education ==
He was born on 10 September 1980 in Lahore to former member of the Provincial Assembly of the Punjab, Ijaz Ahmed Chattha.

He received his early education from Lawrence College, Ghora Gali. He graduated from Government College, Lahore in 2001 and obtained the degree of Master of Science in Anthropology from Quaid-i-Azam University in 2004.

== Political career ==
He was elected to the Provincial Assembly of the Punjab as a candidate of the Pakistan Muslim League (N) (PML-N) from PP-163 (Sheikhupura-II) in the 2008 Punjab provincial election. He received 20,505 votes and defeated a candidate of Pakistan Muslim League (Q).

He was re-elected to the Provincial Assembly of the Punjab as a candidate of the PML-N from PP-163 (Sheikhupura-II) in the 2013 Punjab provincial election. He received 40,772 votes and defeated an independent candidate Rana Ijaz Hussain. During his second tenure as member of the Punjab Assembly, he implemented Rescue 1122 emergency services in Muridke, a fire brigade, a local trauma center, a degree college, a school for children with special needs, a library, and a bus service from Muridke to major universities in Lahore. Reportedly, his focus on education was evident, with numerous degree colleges established along the GT Road due to Chattha's policies.

He was re-elected to the Provincial Assembly of the Punjab as a candidate of the Pakistan Tehreek-e-Insaf (PTI) from PP-136 (Sheikhupura-II) in the 2018 Punjab provincial election. He received 52,539 votes and defeated a candidate of the PML-N.

He ran for a seat in the Provincial Assembly from PP-137 Sheikhupura-II as a PTI-backed candidate in the 2024 Punjab provincial election and was re-elected to the Provincial Assembly. He received 58,171 votes and defeated Muhammad Arshad, a candidate of the PML-N who secured 38,545 votes.

In an interview, he said that politics wasn't his initial career preference, stating, he "wanted to work in the development sector." He also blamed Rana Tanveer Hussain for obstructing his development projects in Muridke.
