= Haseki Sultan Complex =

Mosque in Istanbul, Turkey

- Haseki Sultan Külliyesi
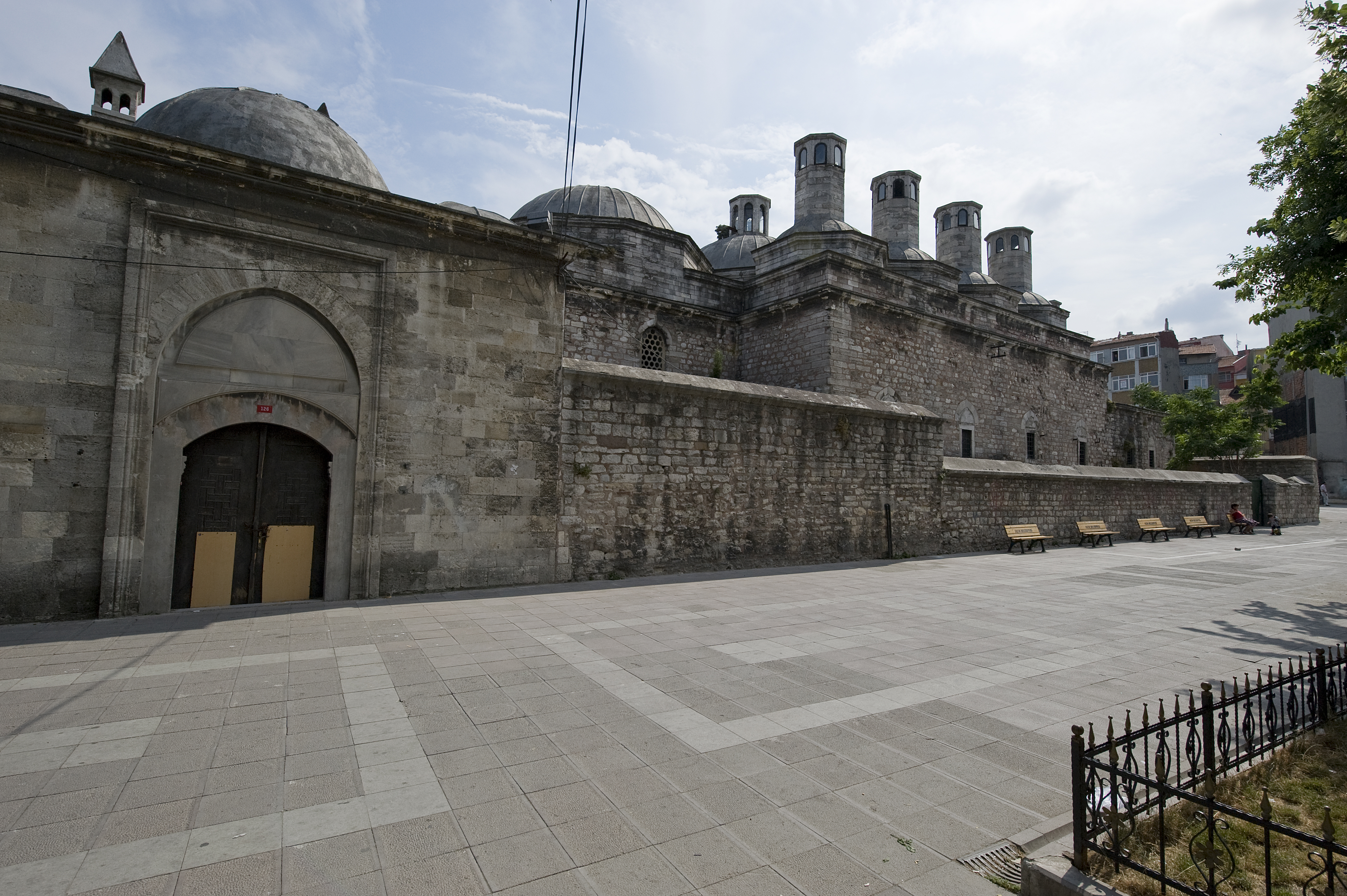

- Location within the Fatih district, Istanbul

Religion
- Affiliation: Sunni Islam

Location
- Location: Avrat Pazarı neighbourhood, Fatih district, Istanbul, Turkey
- Coordinates: 41°0′30.8″N 28°56′30.6″E

Architecture
- Architect: Mimar Sinan
- Style: Ottoman
- Completed: Mosque: 1538–39 (second dome added in 1612–13); Madrasa: 1539–40; Soup-kitchen: 1540–41; Hospital: 1550–51

Specifications
- Dome dia. (inner): 11.3 m
- Minaret: 1

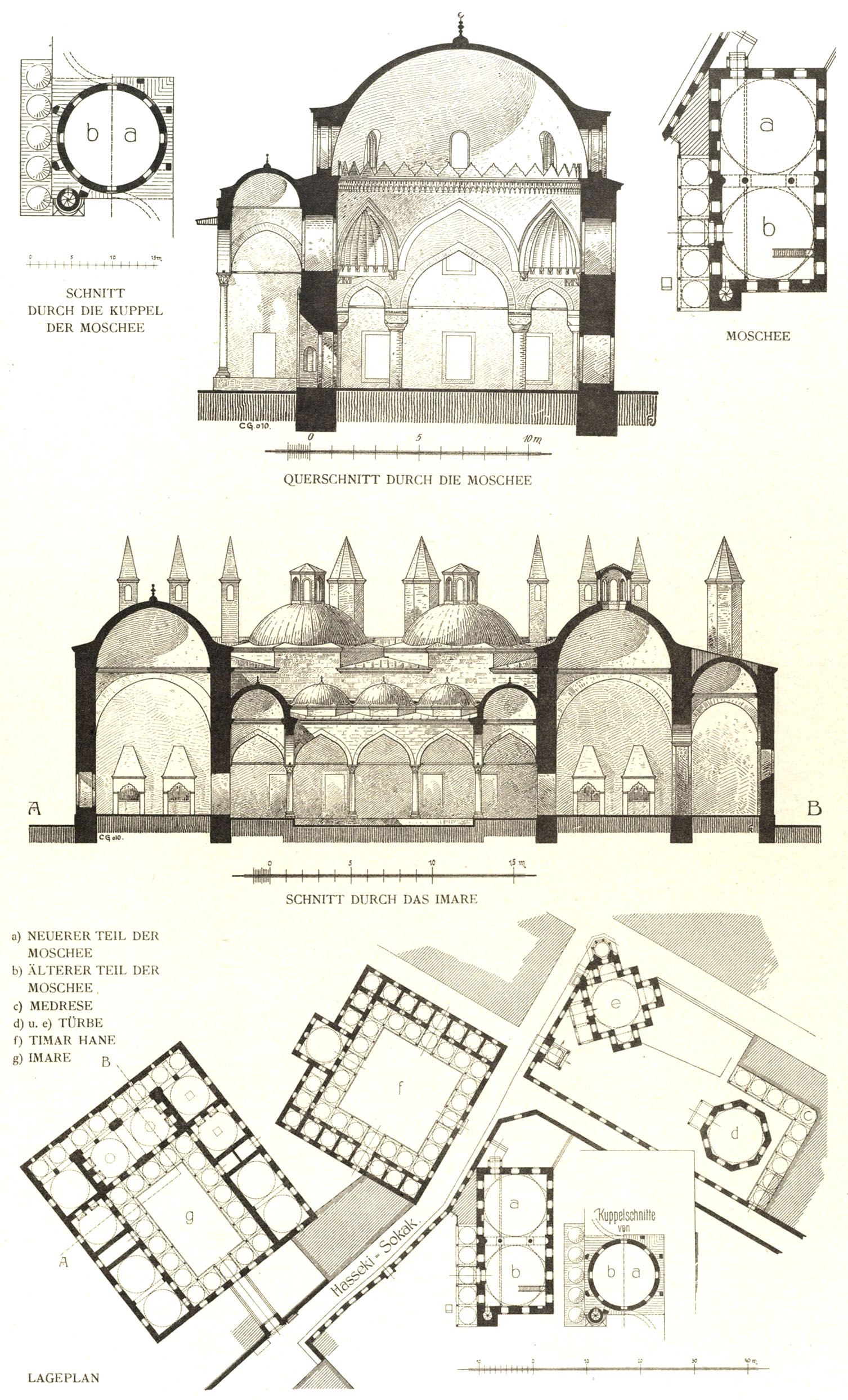
Elevations and plans published by Cornelius Gurlitt in 1912

The Haseki Sultan Complex (also Hürrem Sultan Complex) (Turkish: Haseki Sultan Külliyesi) is a 16th-century Ottoman imperial mosque complex in the Fatih district of Istanbul, Turkey. It was the first royal project designed by the chief imperial architect Mimar Sinan.

== History ==
The mosque complex was commissioned by Haseki Hürrem Sultan, the wife of the Ottoman Sultan Suleiman the Magnificent. She had married the sultan around 1534 and probably used her dowry to finance the project. The buildings were designed by the architect Mimar Sinan. It was his first imperial project and it is possible that some elements were planned by his predecessor.

The complex contained a Friday mosque, a soup-kitchen (imaret), a madrasa, an elementary school (mektep) and a hospital (darüssifa). The large complex was built in several stages on either side of a narrow street. The mosque was completed in 1538–39 (AH 945), the madrasa was completed a year later in 1539–40 (AH 946) and the soup-kitchen in 1540–41 (AH 947). The hospital was not completed until 1550–51 (AH 957).

== Description ==
The simple mosque is constructed with alternating courses of stone and brick and has a single-galleried minaret. The portico has five arches with five small domes supported by six thin marble columns. Originally the prayer-hall was covered by a single dome with a diameter of 11.3 meters. In 1612–13, during the reign of Ahmed I, the mosque was enlarged to accommodate an increased congregation. A second dome was added and the prayer hall was doubled in size. The painted decorations on the dome are not original. Unlike the madrasa and the soup-kitchen, the mosque lacks any cuerda seca tile-work.

The hospital has an octagonal courtyard and is the only building in the complex with an ashlar construction. The carved stone inscription over the entrance from the street is a chronogram in Turkish giving the date of construction. The madrasa is U-shaped around a central courtyard with 16 small cells and a lecture hall. The soup-kitchen is also arranged around a courtyard. The cooking area at the northern end has four octagonal chimneys. A surviving account book shows that there were originally tiled lunette panels above six of the windows.

The complex was restored in 2010–2012.

== Gallery ==
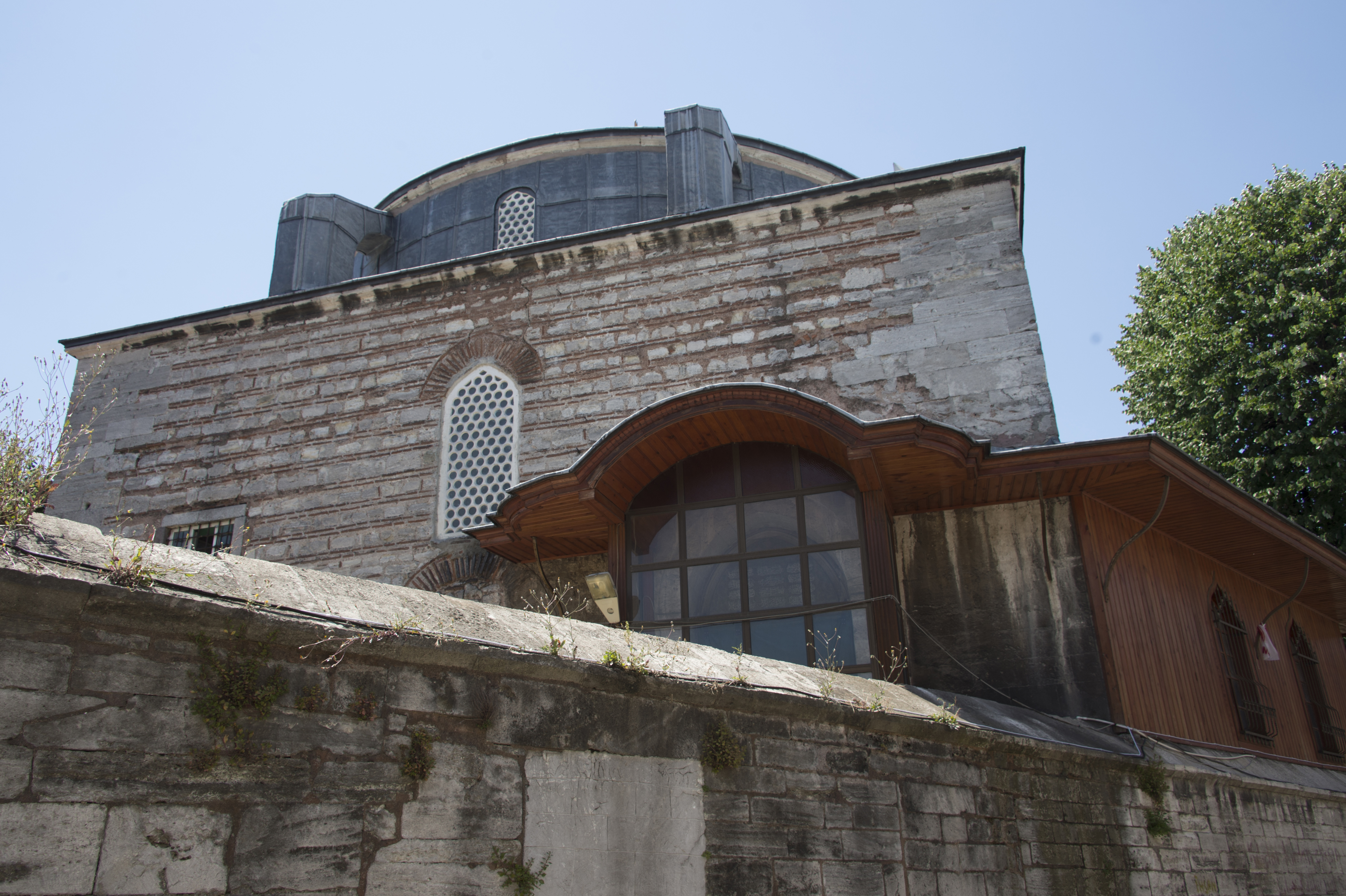
Haseki mosque from street

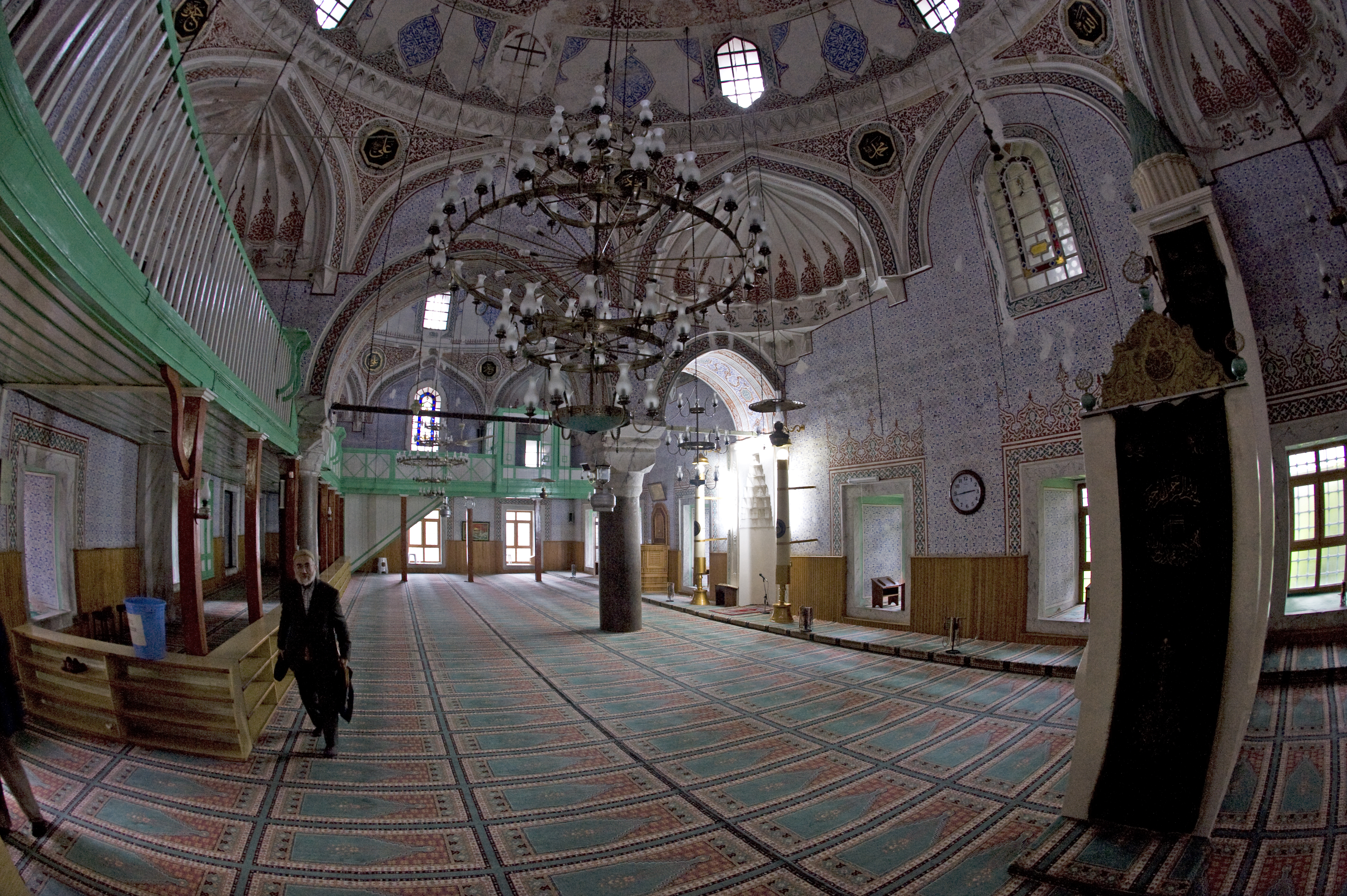
Haseki mosque general view

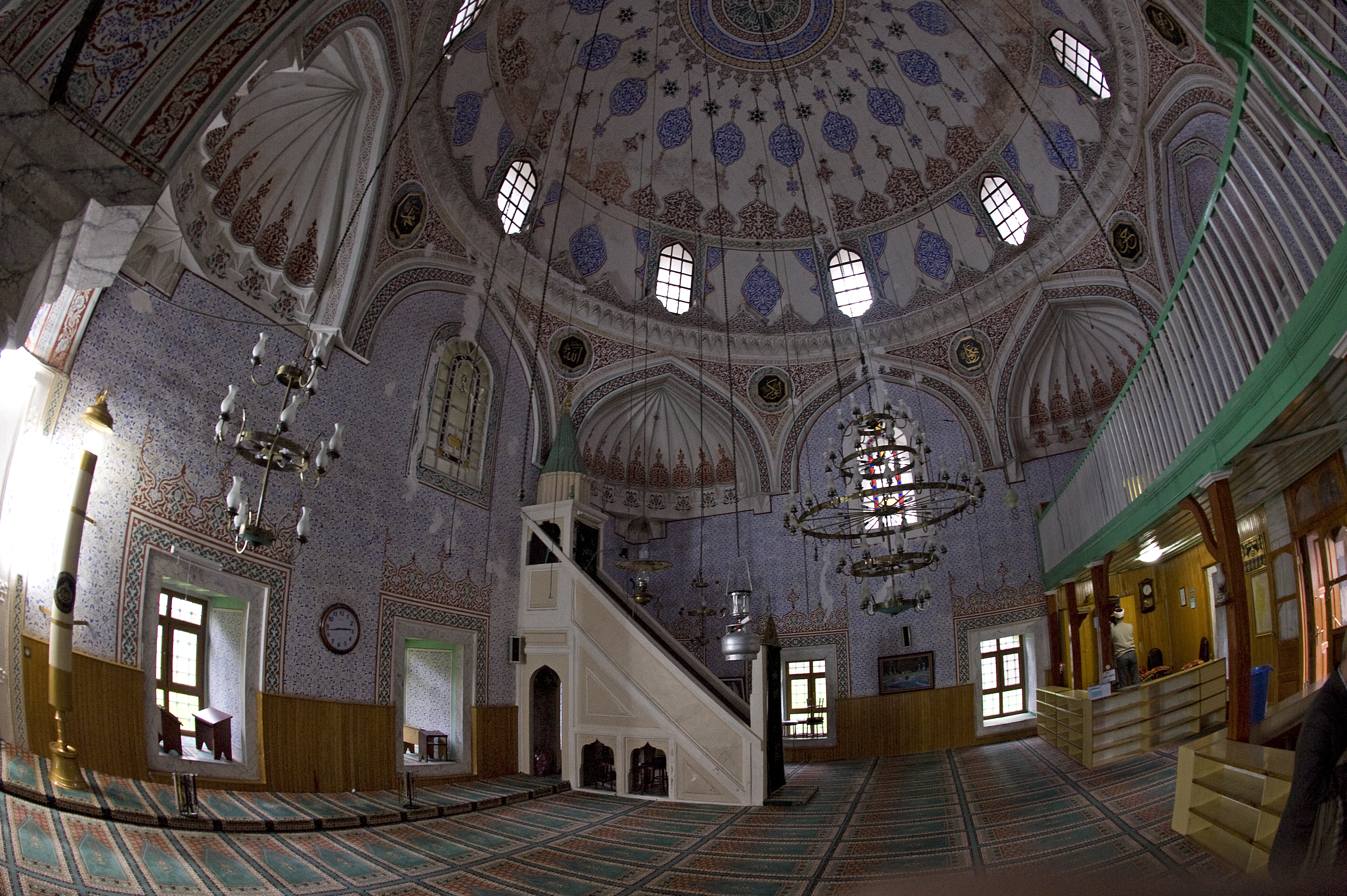
Haseki mosque original part

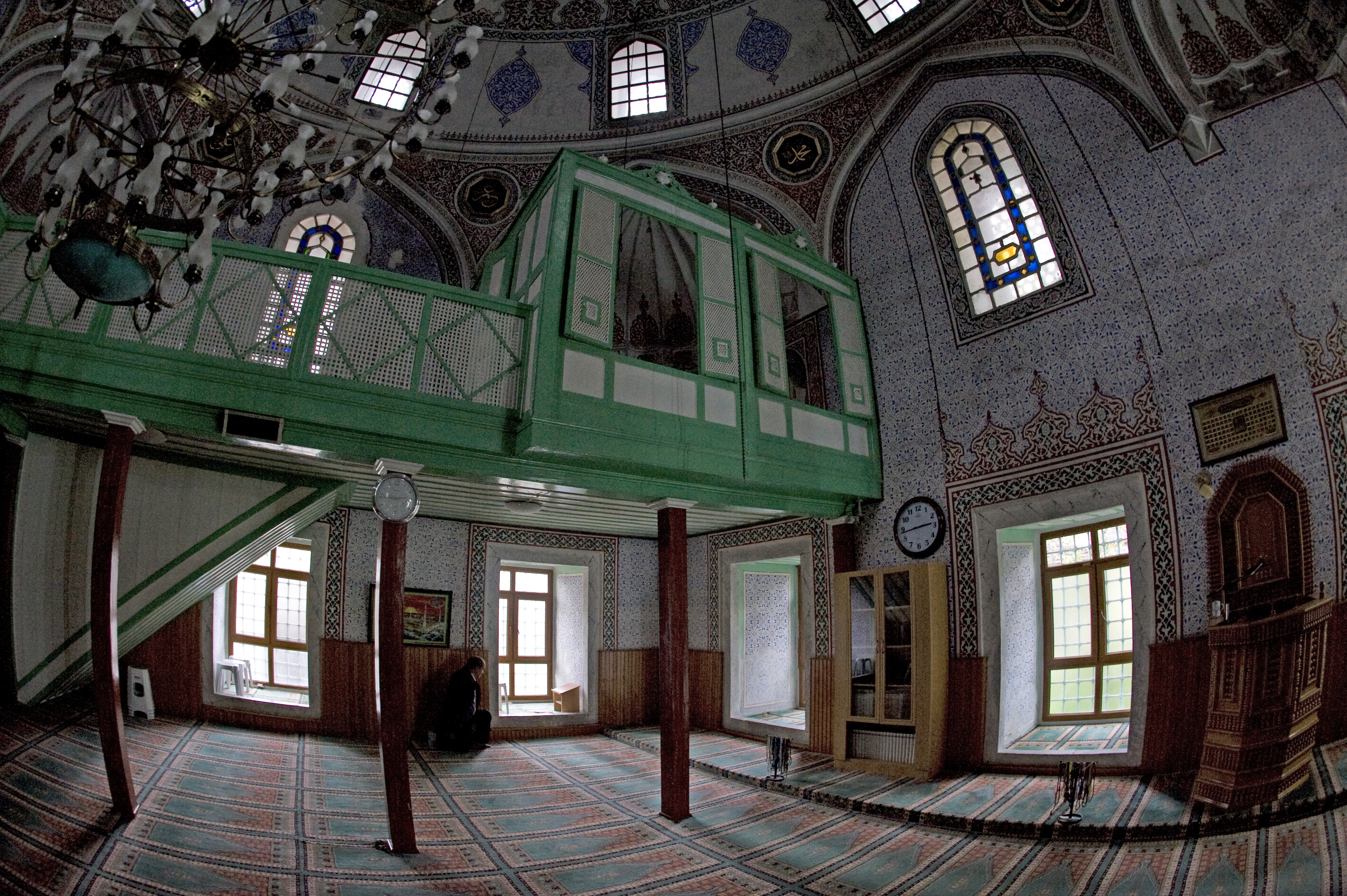
Haseki mosque added part with hünkar mahfili

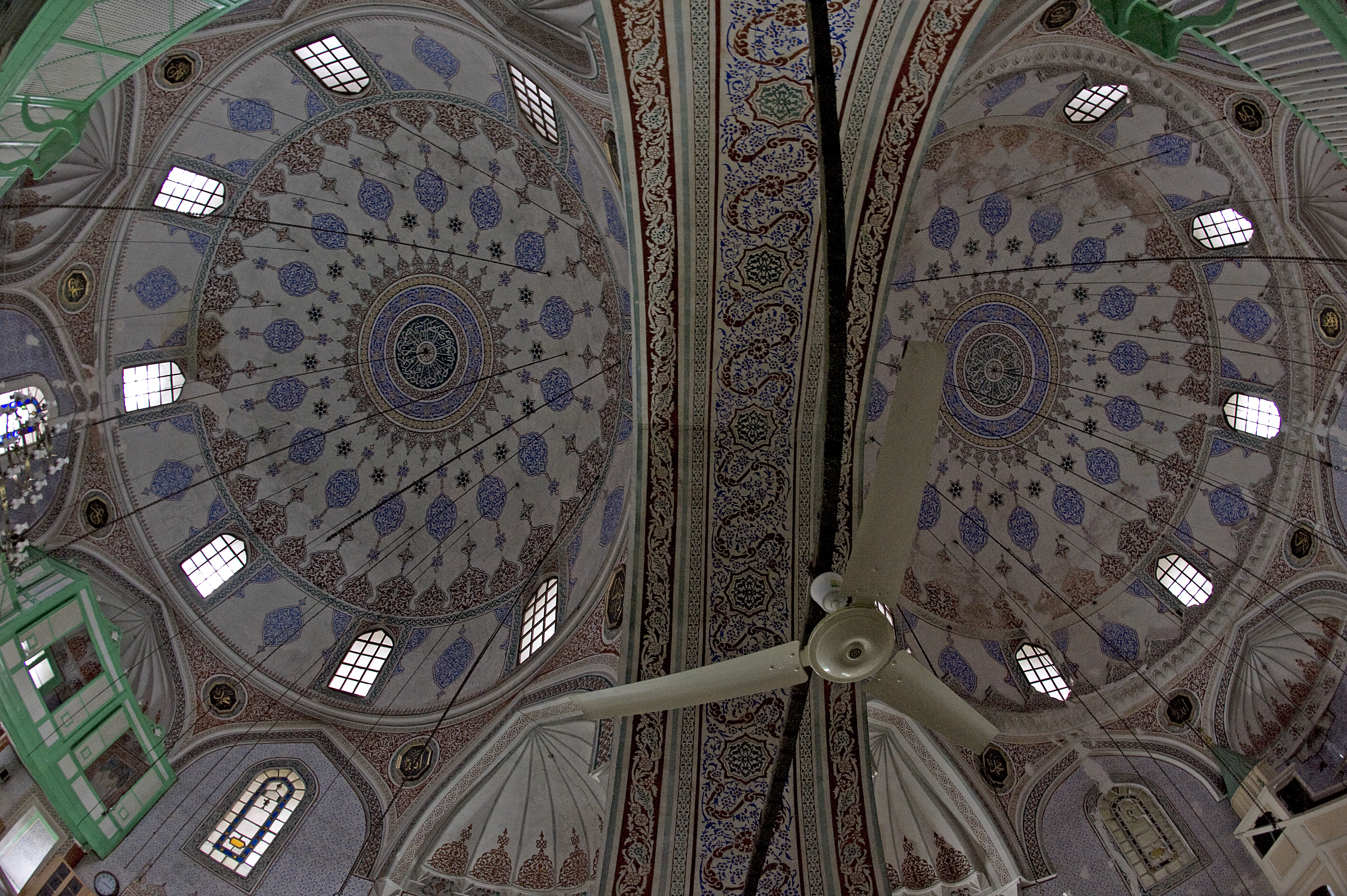
Haseki mosque, the first and second domes

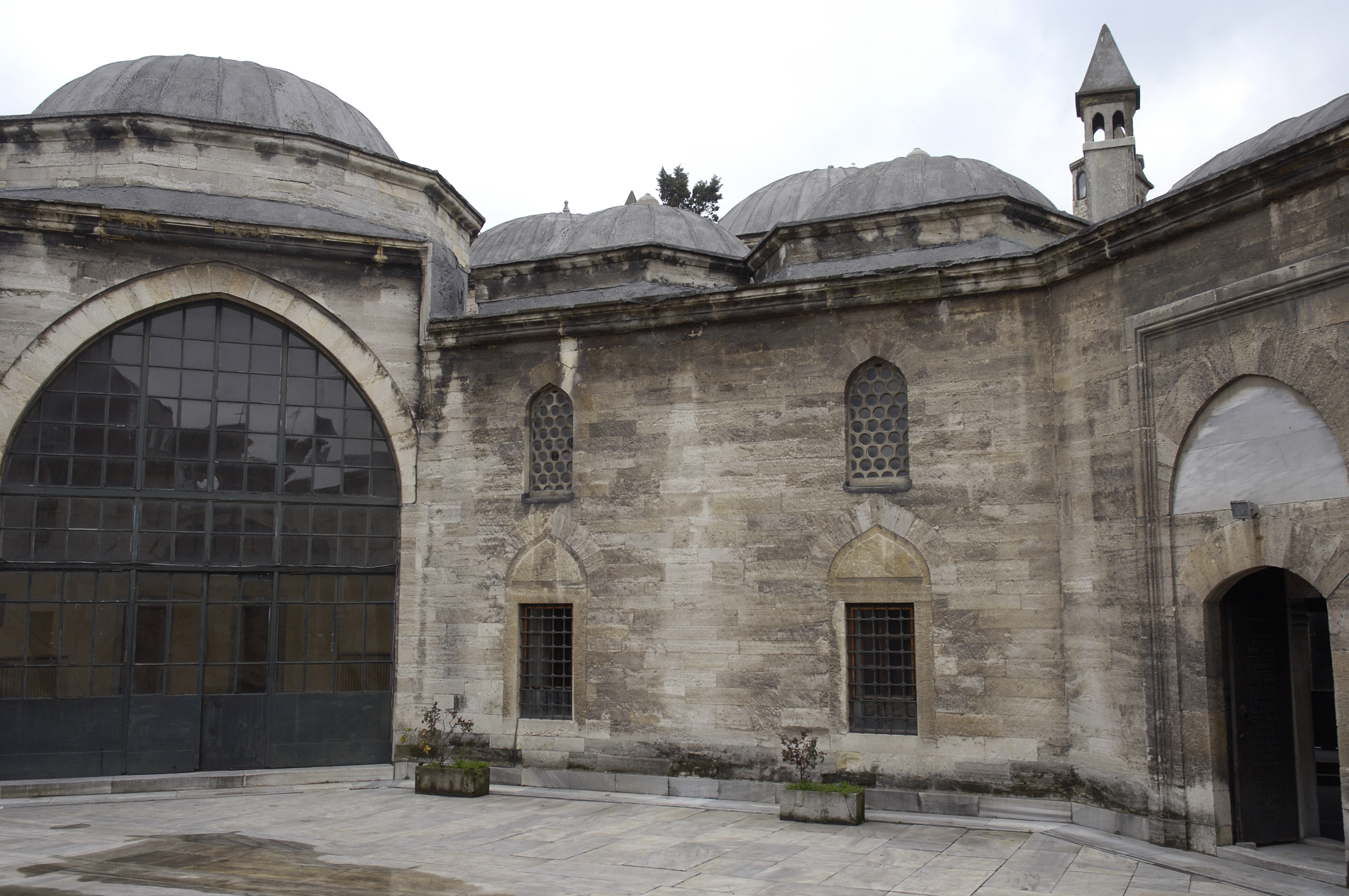
Haseki complex entrance to some buildings

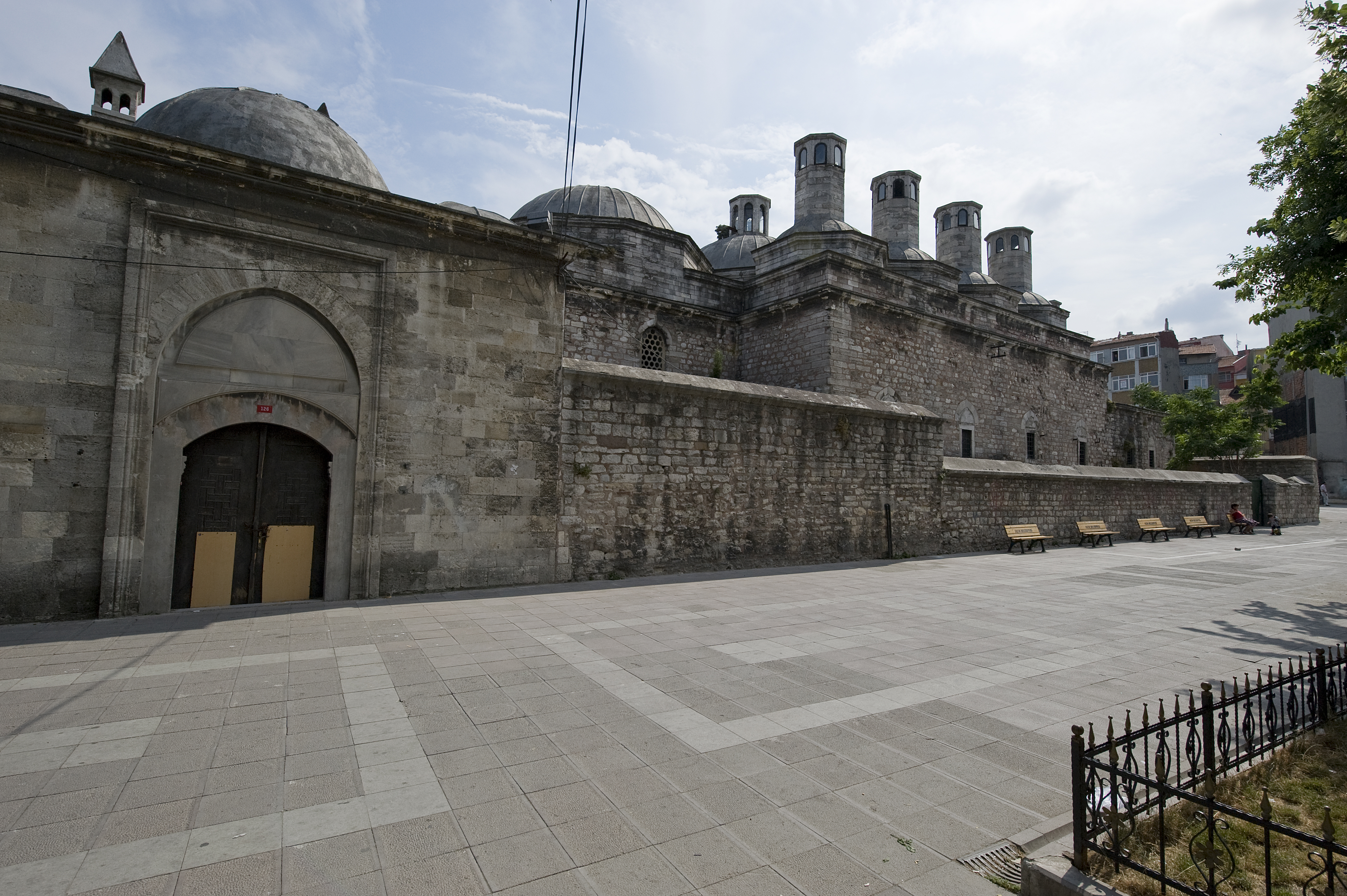
Haseki complex west side

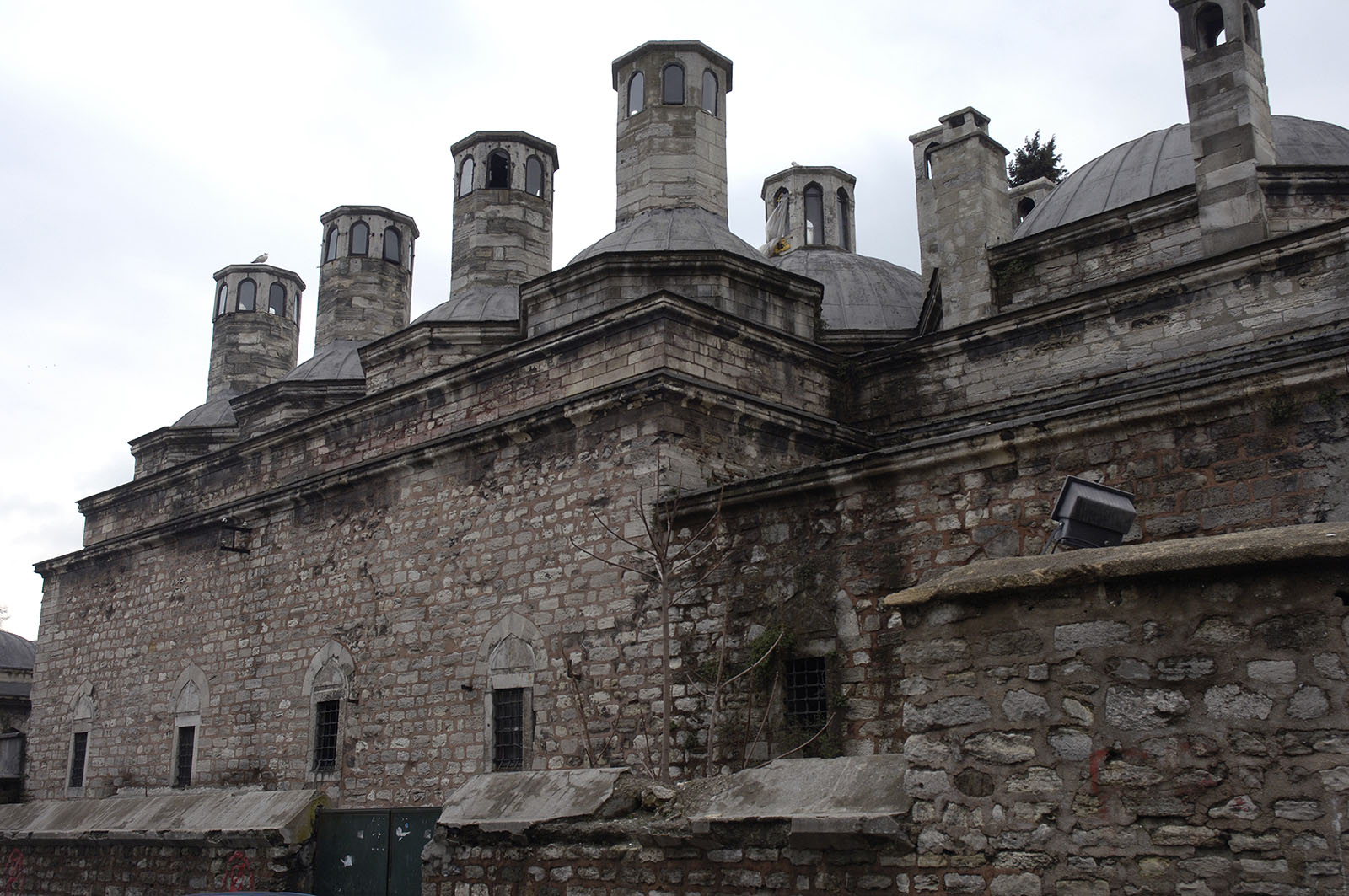
Haseki complex kitchens of imaret

== See also ==
- List of Friday mosques designed by Mimar Sinan

== Sources ==
- Alioğlu, E. Füsun; Olcay, Aydemir; Sünnetçi, Ebru (2012). "Haseki Hürrem Sultan Külliyesi 2010-2012 Yılları Restorasyonu" (PDF). Vakıf Restorasyon Yıllığı (in Turkish). 4. Istanbul: Turkish Government, Istanbul Region: 17–29. ISSN 2146-3166. Archived from the original (PDF) on 2016-03-04.
- Goodwin, Godfrey (1971). A History of Ottoman Architecture. London: Thames and Hudson. ISBN 0-500-27429-0.
- Necipoğlu, Gülru (2005). The Age of Sinan: Architectural Culture in the Ottoman Empire. London: Reaktion Books. ISBN 978-1-86189-253-9.
