= Khurram Abbas Sial =

Pakistani politician

Member of the Provincial Assembly of the Punjab
- In office 29 May 2013 – 31 May 2018

Personal details
- Born: 14 July 1981 (age 45)
- Party: Pakistan Muslim League (Nawaz)

Khurram Abbas Sial is a Pakistani politician who was a Member of the Provincial Assembly of the Punjab, from May 2013 to May 2018.

== Early life and education ==
He was born on 14 July 1981.

He has a degree of Bachelor of Arts.

== Political career ==
He was elected to the Provincial Assembly of the Punjab as an independent candidate from Constituency PP-77 (Jhang-V) in the 2013 Pakistani general election. He joined Pakistan Muslim League (N) in May 2013.
