= Sadiq Mahmud Khurram =

Justice of the Lahore High Court

Justice of the Lahore High Court
- Incumbent
- Assumed office 23 October 2018

Personal details
- Born: 8 January 1973 (age 53)

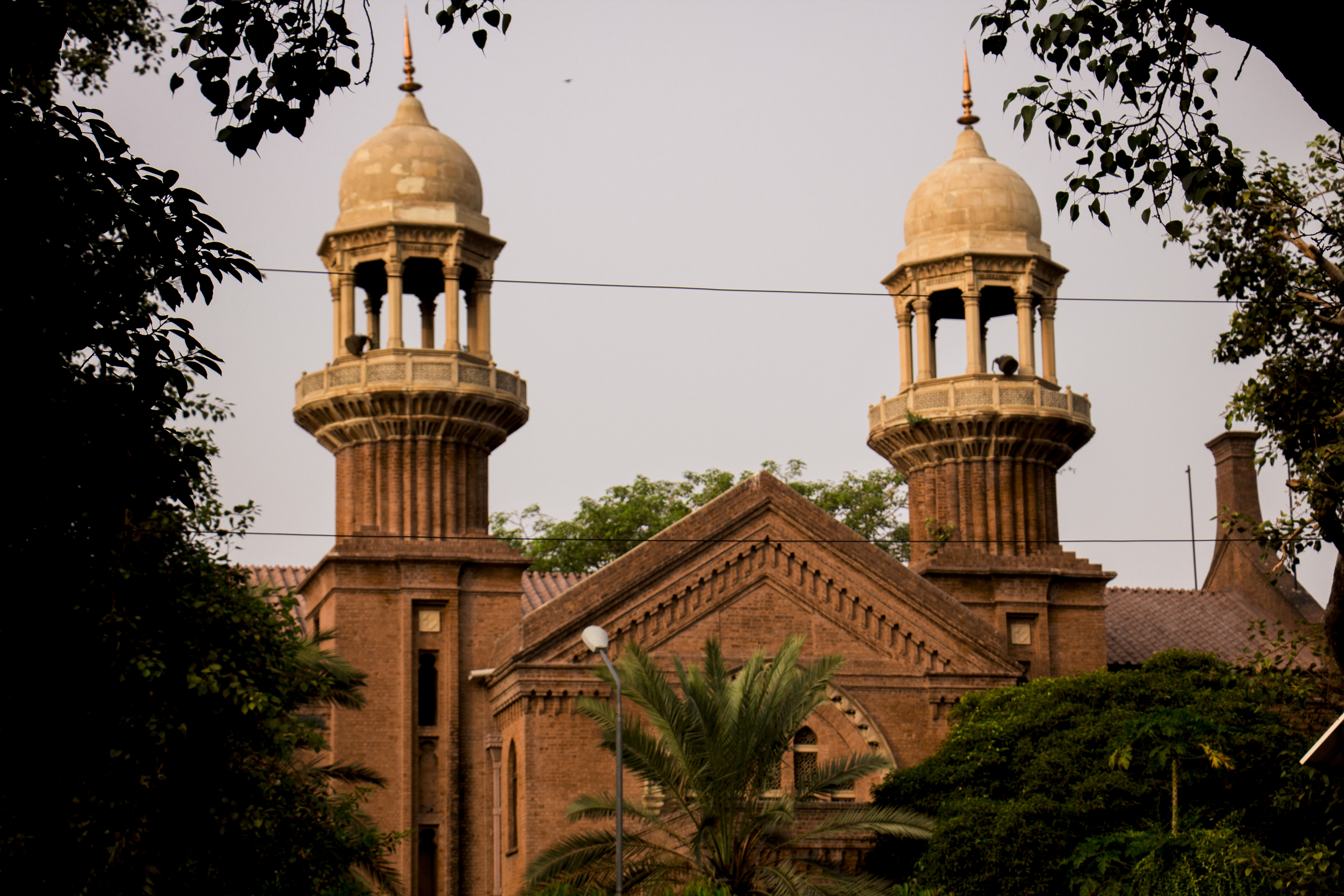
Lahore High Court

Sadiq Mahmud Khurram (born 8 January 1973) is a Pakistani jurist who has been a judge of the Lahore High Court since 23 October 2018.

== Career ==
Khurram was inducted into the Lahore High Court (LHC) as an additional justice on 23 October 2018. He became a permanent Justice of the LHC on 18 October 2019.
