= Khurram Colony =

Khuram Colony
- Neighborhood
- Location within Pakistan
- Coordinates: 33°37′33.7″N 73°05′39.1″E
- Country: Pakistan
- Province: Punjab
- District: Rawalpindi
- Time zone: UTC+5 (PST)

Khurram Colony is a neighborhood and a Union Council of Rawalpindi City of Rawalpindi District in the Punjab province of Pakistan. It is located adjacent to the neighborhoods of Muslim Town, and runs along the southern side of Haji Chowk to the Jaahaz Ground Shop. The former Benazir Bhutto International Airport abuts the southern edge of the suburb.
