= Khurram Shahzad (weightlifter) =

Pakistani weightlifter

Khurram Shahzad (b: 1981) is a weightlifter from Pakistan.

== Career ==
=== 2010 ===
Shahzad won a gold medal at the 2010 South Asian Games held in Dhaka, Bangladesh.

He participated in the 2010 Commonwealth Games in New Delhi, India in the 85 kg category.

In 2012 Shahzad was suspended for two years after he failed a drug test.
