= NA-188 Rajanpur-II =

Constituency of the National Assembly of Pakistan

- Constituency for the National Assembly of Pakistan
- Region: Jampur Tehsil (partly) and Rajanpur Tehsil (partly) including Rajanpur city of Rajanpur District
- Electorate: 374,761

Current constituency
- Created: 2018
- Party: Pakistan Muslim League (N)
- Member: Hafeez-ur-Rehman Dreshak
- Created from: NA-175 (Rajanpur-II)

NA-188 Rajanpur-II (این اے-188، راجن پُور-2) is a newly created a constituency for the National Assembly of Pakistan. It mainly comprises the city and tehsil of Rajanpur from the old NA-175. A minor area of the constituency also includes the town of Fazilpur, which was previously included in NA-174.

== Election 2018 ==
General elections were held on 25 July 2018.

General election 2018: NA-194 Rajanpur-II
Party	Candidate	Votes	%	±%
PTI	Sardar Nasrullah Khan Dreshak	73,839	42.30	
Independent	Hafeez-ur-Rehman Dreshak	64,739	37.08	
PPP	Khawaja Kaleem-Ud-Din Koreja	11,701	6.70	
Independent	Ruqyia Bibi	11,129	6.38	
Independent	Khawja Ghulam Fareed Koreja	3,955	2.27	
MMA	Abdul Mohsin	2,859	1.64	
Independent	Sardar Pervaz Iqbal Gorchani	1,540	0.88	
TLP	Sohail Anwar	1,375	0.79	
Independent	Aman Ullah Quraishi	1,362	0.78	
Independent	Sardar Zulficiar Khan Dreshak	1,170	0.67	
Independent	Sardar Muhammad Yousaf Dreshak	492	0.28	
Independent	Sardar Hasnain Bahadar Dreshak	222	0.13	
Independent	Sardar Ali Raza Khan Dreshak	187	0.11	
Turnout		181,645	60.11	
Total valid votes		174,570	96.11	
Rejected ballots		7,075	3.89	
Majority		9,100	5.21	
Registered electors		302,211		
PTI gain from PML(N)				

== Election 2024 ==
General elections were held on 8 February 2024. Hafeez-ur-Rehman Dreshak won the election with 85,979 votes.

General election 2024: NA-188 Rajanpur-II
Party	Candidate	Votes	%	±%
PML(N)	Hafeez-ur-Rehman Dreshak	85,979	47.29	
PTI	Ahmad Ali Khan Dreshak (Note: Filed nomination papers as PTI candidate but ECP allowed him to run as an Independent)	70,262	38.65	▼3.65
PPP	Liaqat Ali	13,579	7.47	▲0.77
Others	Others (seven candidates)	11,990	6.59	
Turnout		189,370	50.53	▼9.58
Total valid votes		181,810	96.01	
Rejected ballots		7,560	3.99	
Majority		15,717	8.64	
Registered electors		374,761		
PML(N) gain from PTI				

== See also ==
- NA-187 Rajanpur-I
- NA-189 Rajanpur-III
