= PP-296 Rajanpur-V =

Constituency of the Punjabi Provincial Legislature, Pakistan

- Constituency for the Provincial Assembly of Punjab
- Region: Rajanpur Tehsil (partly) Kot Mithan town and Rojhan Tehsil (partly) of Rajanpur District

Current constituency
- Party: Pakistan Tehreek-e-Insaf
- Member: Awais Dreshak
- Created from: PP-248 Rajanpur-II (2002-2018); PP-296 Rajanpur-IV (2018-2023)

PP-296 Rajanpur-V (پی پی-296، راجن پُور-5) is a Constituency of Provincial Assembly of Punjab.

== Members of Assembly ==
=== 2018-2023 PP-296 Rajanpur-IV ===
Election	Member	Party
2018	Awais Dareshak	PTI

== General elections 2024 ==
Provincial election 2024: PP-296 Rajanpur-V
Party	Candidate	Votes	%	±%
Independent	Awais Dareshak	42,772	43.83	
PML(N)	Sardar Muhammad Yousaf Drishak	41,701	42.73	
TLP	Zahid Mahmood Mazari	4,714	4.83	
Independent	Hamza Farid Malik (Note: Filed nomination papers as PTI candidate but ECP allowed him to run as an independent)	2,447	2.51	
Others	Others (fourteen candidates)	5,950	6.10	
Turnout		102,739	55.50	
Total valid votes		97,584	94.98	
Rejected ballots		5,155	5.02	
Majority		1,071	1.10	
Registered electors		185,130		
hold				

== General elections 2018 ==
Tariq Dareshak of Pakistan Tehreek-e-Insaf won the seat by getting 42,190 votes. However, Dareshak died before he ever took oath.

Provincial election 2018: PP-296 Rajanpur-IV
Party	Candidate	Votes	%	±%
PTI	Tariq Dareshak	42,190	39.44	
Independent	Yousaf Dareshak	27,174	25.40	
Independent	Muhammad Masood Akhtar	19,699	18.42	
Independent	Ghulam Fareed Koreja	5,711	5.34	
Independent	Ghulam Mohiuddin	4,829	4.51	
Independent	Sana ullah	2,027	1.90	
Independent	Hafeez-ur-Rehman Dreshak	2,025	1.89	
Independent	Ali Hassan Fareed	1,883	1.76	
TLP	Ijaz Hussain	1,003	0.94	
Independent	Shahnawaz Manzoor	230	0.22	
Independent	Awais Dareshak	117	0.11	
Independent	Arsalan Mehmood	78	0.07	
Turnout		111,559	62.71	
Total valid votes		106,966	95.88	
Rejected ballots		4,593	4.12	
Majority		15,016	14.04	
Registered electors		1,77,875		
PTI win (new seat)				

== General elections 2013 ==
Provincial election 2013: PP-248 Rajanpur-II
Party	Candidate	Votes	%	±%
PML(N)	Sardar Sher Ali Gorchani	48,090	44.08	
Independent	Sardar Hasnain Bahadur	35,310	32.37	
PPP	Sardar Ather Hassan Khan Gorchani	19,616	17.98	
PTI	Sardar Naveed Gul Khan	1,794	1.64	
JI	Abdul Mohsin	1,496	1.37	
Others	Others (eleven candidates)	2,791	2.56	
Turnout		114,539	63.57	
Total valid votes		109,097	95.25	
Rejected ballots		5,442	4.75	
Majority		12,780	11.71	
Registered electors		180,175		

== See also ==
- PP-295 Rajanpur-IV
- PP-297 Rajanpur-VI
