= Sardar Sher Ali Gorchani =

Pakistani politician

Deputy Speaker of Provincial Assembly of the Punjab
- In office June 2013 – May 2018
- Speaker: Rana Muhammad Iqbal Khan
- Succeeded by: Dost Muhammad Mazari

Member of the Provincial Assembly of the Punjab
- In office 2008 – 31 May 2018

Personal details
- Born: 17 May 1980 (age 46) Dera Ghazi Khan, Punjab, Pakistan
- Party: PMLN (2008-present)

Sardar Sher Ali Gorchani is a Pakistani politician who served as Deputy Speaker of Provincial Assembly of the Punjab from June 2013 to May 2018. He was a Member of the Provincial Assembly of the Punjab from 2008 to May 2018.

== Early life and education ==
He was born on 17 May 1980 in Dera Ghazi Khan, Punjab. He belongs to a Punjabi Baloch family of the Gurchani tribe, particularly influential in the Rajanpur District. His family roots lie in Tamman Gorchani Lalgarh area of Jampur and his father Parvez Iqbal Gorchani as well his brother Sher Afgan Gorchani both being politicians.

He completed his graduation in 2006 from Multan and has a degree of Bachelor of Arts.

== Political career ==
He was elected to the Provincial Assembly of the Punjab as a candidate of Pakistan Muslim League (N) (PML-N) from Constituency PP-247 (Rajanpur-I) in the 2008 Pakistani general election. He received 24,392 votes and defeated a candidate of Pakistan Muslim League (Q). He served as Parliamentary Secretary for Colonies and Consolidation from 2008 to 2013.

He was re-elected to the Provincial Assembly of the Punjab as a candidate of PML-N from Constituency PP-248 (Rajanpur-II) in the 2013 Pakistani general election. In June 2013, he was elected as deputy speaker of the Provincial Assembly of the Punjab.

In 2018, he was allocated the PML-N ticket to contest the 2018 Pakistani general election and the 2018 Punjab provincial election from NA-193 Rajanpur-I and from PP-293 Rajanpur-I, respectively. However, he refused to take party ticket and ran as an independent in both constituencies, but was unsuccessful. In NA-193 Rajanpur-I, he received 46,748 votes and was defeated by Jaffar Khan Leghari, a candidate of the Pakistan Tehreek-e-Insaf (PTI). In PP-293 Rajanpur-I, he revived 33,454 votes and was defeated by Muhammad Mohsin Khan Leghari, a candidate of the PTI.

In March 2024, he was made part of the Maryam Nawaz cabinet at the provincial level in Punjab, becoming minister of Mines and Minerals.

== Controversies ==
=== Abduction accusation ===
In 2002, Sher Ali was accused of having kidnapped and then married at gunpoint
