= PP-293 Rajanpur-II =

Constituency of the Punjabi Provincial Legislature, Pakistan

- Constituency for the Provincial Assembly of Punjab
- Region: Jampur Tehsil (partly) including Jampur city of Rajanpur District

Current constituency
- Created: 2023
- Party: Pakistan Muslim League (N)
- Member: Sardar Sher Ali Khan Gurchani
- Created from: PP-293 Rajanpur-I (2018-2023)

PP-293 Rajanpur-II (پی پی-293، راجن پُور-2) is a Constituency of Provincial Assembly of Punjab. It was created after 2023 Delimitations when Rajanpur District gained 1 seat after 2023 Census.

== 2024 Elections ==
Provincial election 2024: PP-293 Rajanpur-II
Party	Candidate	Votes	%	±%
PML(N)	Sardar Sher Ali Gorchani	38,454	39.91	
Independent	Miraz Muhammad Shahzad Humyun	35,151	36.48	
PPP	Shazia Abid	7,794	8.09	
Independent	Shafee Ali Quershi	5,022	5.21	
Independent	Mirza Muhammad Yasir Mubeen (Note: Filed nomination papers as PTI candidate but ECP allowed him to run as an Independent)	4,581	4.76	
TLP	Abdul Latif	2,360	2.45	
Others	Others (nine candidates)	2,986	3.10	
Turnout		100,521	52.92	
Total valid votes		96,348	95.85	
Rejected ballots		4,173	4.15	
Majority		3,303	3.43	
Registered electors		189,937		
hold				

== See also ==
- PP-292 Rajanpur-I
- PP-294 Rajanpur-III
