= PP-295 Rajanpur-IV =

Constituency of the Punjabi Provincial Legislature, Pakistan

- Constituency for the Provincial Assembly of Punjab
- Region: Rajanpur Tehsil (partly) including Rajanpur city of Rajanpur District

Current constituency
- Party: Pakistan Tahreek insaf (IND)
- Member: Sardar farooq amanullah khan Dareshak]]
- Created from: PP-249 Rajanpur-III (2002-2018); PP-295 Rajanpur-III (2018-2023)

PP-295 Rajanpur-IV (پی پی-295، راجن پُور-4) is a Constituency of Provincial Assembly of Punjab.

== General elections 2024 ==
Provincial election 2024: PP-295 Rajanpur-IV
Party	Candidate	Votes	%	±%
PML(N)	Abdul Aziz Khan	37,922	41.84	
PTI	Sardar Farooq Amanullah Dreshak (Note: Filed)	31,685	34.96	
Independent	Chaudhary Muhammad Masood Akhtar	10,916	12.05	
PPP	Sardar Muhammad Yousaf Khan Gabool	4,411	4.87	
Others	Others (fifteen candidates)	5,693	6.28	
Turnout		94,656	52.48	
Total valid votes		90,627	95.74	
Rejected ballots		4,029	4.26	
Majority		6,237	6.88	
Registered electors		180,369		
hold				

== General elections 2018 ==
Provincial election 2018: PP-295 Rajanpur-III
Party	Candidate	Votes	%	±%
PTI	Sardar Farooq Amanullah Dreshak	49,427	47.23	
Independent	Sardar Pervaiz Iqbal Gourchani	37,766	36.08	
PPP	Khawaja Kaleem-Ud-Din Koreja	5,780	5.52	
Independent	Abdullah Amir	4,262	4.07	
Independent	Shafqat Karim Gopang	2,746	2.62	
MMA	Abdul Rasheed	1,189	1.14	
Others	Others (ten candidates)	3,491	3.34	
Turnout		108,603	62.40	
Total valid votes		104,661	96.37	
Rejected ballots		3,942	3.63	
Majority		11,661	11.15	
Registered electors		174,055		

== General elections 2013 ==
Provincial election 2013: PP-249 Rajanpur-III
Party	Candidate	Votes	%	±%
Independent	Sardar Nasrullah Khan Drishak	40,136	37.32	
PML(N)	Sardar Muhammad Tariq Drishak	27,054	25.15	
Independent	Sardar Abdul Aziz Khan Drishak	24,872	23.12	
PTI	Muhammad Farooq Khan Buzdar	4,415	4.10	
Independent	Chauhdary Muhammad Masood Akhtar Rajbot	4,035	3.75	
PPP	Muhammad Yousaf Khan Gabol	3,433	3.19	
Independent	Sardar Hussnain Bahadur	1,270	1.18	
Others	Others (seven candidates)	2,341	2.18	
Turnout		115,657	65.28	
Total valid votes		107,556	93.00	
Rejected ballots		8,101	7.00	
Majority		13,082	12.17	
Registered electors		177,165		

== General elections 2008 ==
Contesting candidates	Party affiliation	Votes polled

== See also ==
- PP-294 Rajanpur-III
- PP-296 Rajanpur-V
