= Hafeez-ur-Rehman Dreshak =

Pakistani politician (born 1957)

Hafeez-ur-Rehman Khan Dreshak
- حفیظ الرحمان خان دریشک

Member of the National Assembly of Pakistan
- Incumbent
- Assumed office 29 February 2024
- Constituency: NA-188 Rajanpur-II
- In office 1 June 2013 – 31 May 2018
- Constituency: NA-175 (Rajanpur-II)

Personal details
- Born: January 1, 1957 (age 69) Rajanpur, Punjab, Pakistan
- Party: IPP (2026-present)
- Other political affiliations: PMLN (2023-2026); IND (2018-2023); PMLN (2013-2018); PPP (2008)

Hafeez-ur-Rehman Khan Dreshak (Urdu: حفیظ الرحمن خان درشک; born 1 January 1957) is a Pakistani politician who has been a member of the National Assembly of Pakistan since February 2024, and previously served in this position from June 2013 to May 2018.

== Life and career ==
Dreshak was born on 1 January 1957.

He ran for the seat of Provincial Assembly of Punjab as a candidate of Pakistan Peoples Party (PPP) from Constituency PP-248 (Rajanpur-II) in the 2008 Pakistani general election but was unsuccessful. He received 15,452 votes and lost the seat to an independent candidate, Sardar Athar Hassan Khan Gorchani.

He was elected to the National Assembly of Pakistan as a candidate of Pakistan Muslim League (N) (PML-N) from Constituency NA-175 (Rajanpur-II) in the 2013 Pakistani general election. He received 110,573 votes and defeated an independent candidate, Dost Muhammad Mazari.

He contested the 2018 Pakistani general election as an independent candidate from NA-194 Rajanpur-II, but was unsuccessful. He received 64,739 votes and was defeated by Sardar Nasrullah Khan Dreshak, a candidate of Pakistan Tehreek-e-Insaf (PTI).

He was re-elected to the National Assembly from NA-188 Rajanpur-II as a candidate of PML-N in the 2024 Pakistani general election. He received 85,979 votes and defeated Ahmad Ali Khan Dreshak, an Independent politician candidate supported by PTI.
