= NA-189 Rajanpur-III =

Constituency of the National Assembly of Pakistan

- Constituency for the National Assembly of Pakistan
- Region: Rojhan Tehsil and Rajanpur Tehsil (partly) of Rajanpur District
- Electorate: 374,374

Current constituency
- Created: 2018
- Party: Pakistan Muslim League (N)
- Member: Shamsher Ali Mazari
- Created from: NA-175 (Rajanpur-II)

NA-189 Rajanpur-III (این اے-189، راجن پُور-3) is a newly created constituency for the National Assembly of Pakistan. It mainly comprises the Rojhan Tehsil and the town of Kot Mithan. It was created in the 2018 delimitation from the bifurcation of the old NA-175.

== Election 2018 ==
General elections were held on 25 July 2018. Sardar Riaz Mehmood Khan Mazari of the PTI became the member from this constituency.

General election 2018: NA-195 Rajanpur-III
Party	Candidate	Votes	%	±%
PTI	Sardar Riaz Mehmood Khan Mazari	89,829	53.53	
PML(N)	Khizer Hussain Mazari	69,113	41.18	
Independent	Khawja Ghulam Fareed Koreja	3,977	2.37	
Independent	Shamsher Ali Mazari	1,797	1.07	
Independent	Ghulam Mohudin	1,696	1.01	
Independent	Sami Ud Din Mazari	1,021	0.61	
Independent	Athar Ali Mazari	382	0.23	
Turnout		175,601	63.78	
Total valid votes		167,815	95.57	
Rejected ballots		7,786	4.43	
Majority		20,716	12.34	
Registered electors		275,326		

== Election 2024 ==
General elections were held on 8 February 2024. Shamsher Ali Mazari won the election with 73,394 votes.

General election 2024: NA-189 Rajanpur-III
Party	Candidate	Votes	%	±%
PML(N)	Shamsher Ali Mazari	83,628	45.01	▲43.94
Independent	Sardar Riaz Mehmood Khan Mazari	73,394	39.50	▼1.68
PTI	Zahid Khan Mazari (Note: Filed nomination papers as PTI candidate but ECP allowed him to run as an Independent)	10,831	5.83	▼47.70
Others	Others (nine candidates)	17,966	9.67	
Turnout		196,055	52.10	▼11.68
Total valid votes		185,819	94.78	
Rejected ballots		10,236	5.22	
Majority		10,234	5.51	
Registered electors		376,306		
PML(N) gain from PTI				

== See also ==
- NA-188 Rajanpur-II
- NA-190 Jacobabad
