= Sardar Nasrullah Khan Dreshak =

Pakistani politician (born 1942)

Member of the National Assembly of Pakistan
- In office 13 August 2018 – 25 January 2023
- Constituency: NA-194 (Rajanpur-II)

Member of the Provincial Assembly of the Punjab
- In office 29 May 2013 – 31 May 2018

Personal details
- Born: 28 June 1942 (age 83) Rajanpur, Punjab, British India
- Relations: Ahmad Ali Khan Dreshak (grandson)
- Children: Sardar Hasnain Bahadar Dreshak (son); Sardar Ali Raza Khan Dreshak (son)

Sardar Nasrullah Khan Dreshak is a Pakistani politician who had been a member of the National Assembly of Pakistan from August 2018 till January 2023. Previously, he was a member of the National Assembly from 1997 to 1999 and again from 2002 to 2007 and a Member of the Provincial Assembly of the Punjab, between 1977 and May 2018.

== Early life and education ==
He was born on 28 June 1942 in Rajanpur District.

He graduated from Government College, Lahore in 1962. He has a degree of Bachelor of Laws which he obtained in 1964 from Punjab University Law College and a degree of Master of Arts which he received in 1966 from the University of the Punjab.

== Political career ==
He was elected to the Provincial Assembly of the Punjab from Constituency PP-140 (D.G. Khan-VI) in the 1970 Pakistani general election and became Provincial Minister of Punjab for Irrigation and Power.

He was re-elected to the Provincial Assembly of the Punjab from Constituency PP-185 (D.G. Khan-II) in the 1977 Pakistani general election.

He was re-elected to the Provincial Assembly of the Punjab from Constituency PP-189 (Rajanpur) in the 1985 Pakistani general election.

He ran for the seat of the National Assembly of Pakistan from Constituency NA-134 (Rajanpur) as a candidate of Islami Jamhoori Ittehad (IJI) in the 1988 Pakistani general election but was unsuccessful. He received 52,542 votes and lost the seat to Ashiq Muhammad Khan Mazari, a candidate of Pakistan Peoples Party (PPP). In the same election, he was re-elected to the Provincial Assembly of the Punjab from Constituency PP-205 (Rajanpur-II) as a candidate of Islami Jamhoori Ittehad (IJI). He secured 32,485 votes and defeated Muhammad Amanullah Khan, a candidate of Pakistan Peoples Party (PPP). He was inducted into the Punjab provincial cabinet of Chief Minister Nawaz Sharif and was made Provincial Minister of Punjab for Irrigation, Law and Parliamentary Affairs.

He was re-elected to the Provincial Assembly of the Punjab from Constituency PP-205 (Rajanpur-II) as a candidate of IJI in the 1990 Pakistani general election. He secured 40,174 votes and defeated Hafeez-ur-Rehman Khan, a candidate of the Pakistan Democratic Alliance (PDA). Following the election, he was inducted into the Punjab provincial cabinet of Chief Minister Ghulam Haider Wyne and was made Provincial Minister of Punjab for Planning and Development, with the additional portfolio of Law and Parliamentary Affairs.

He ran for the seat of the Provincial Assembly of the Punjab from Constituency PP-205 (Rajanpur-II) as an independent candidate in the 1993 Pakistani general election but was unsuccessful. He received 30,340 votes and lost the seat to an independent candidate, Muhammad Amanullah Khan. In the same election, he ran for the seat of the National Assembly from Constituency NA-134 (Rajanpur) as an independent candidate, but was unsuccessful. He received 61,210 votes and lost the seat to Balakh Sher Mazari.

He was elected to the National Assembly from Constituency NA-134 (Rajanpur) as an independent candidate in the 1997 Pakistani general election. He secured 73,112 votes and defeated Balakh Sher Mazari.

He was re-elected to the National Assembly from Constituency NA-175 (Rajanpur-II) as an independent candidate in the 2002 Pakistani general election. He secured 69,030 votes and defeated an independent candidate, Sardar Khalid Bashir Mazari.

He ran for the seat of the National Assembly from Constituency NA-174 (Rajanpur-I) as an independent candidate and from Constituency NA-175 (Rajanpur-II) as a candidate of Pakistan Muslim League (Q) (PML-Q) in the 2008 Pakistani general election but was unsuccessful and lost the seats to Sardar Muhammad Jaffar Khan Leghari and Dost Muhammad Mazari, respectively. In the same election, he ran for the seat of the Provincial Assembly of the Punjab from Constituency PP-249 (Rajanpur-III) as a candidate of PML-Q but was unsuccessful. He received 24,373 votes and lost the seat to Muhammad Amanullah Khan, a candidate of PPP.

He was re-elected to the Provincial Assembly of the Punjab as an independent candidate from Constituency PP-249 (Rajanpur-III) in the 2013 Pakistani general election. He received 40,136 votes and defeated Sardar Muhammad Tariq Drishak, a candidate of Pakistan Muslim League (N) (PML-N). In the same election, he ran for the seat of the National Assembly from Constituency NA-174 (Rajanpur-I) as an independent candidate but was unsuccessful. He received 61,863 votes and lost the seat to Sardar Muhammad Jaffar Khan Leghari. In the same election, he also ran for the seat of the Provincial Assembly of the Punjab from Constituency PP-247 (Rajanpur-I) as an independent candidate but was unsuccessful. He received 108 votes and lost the seat to Shahbaz Sharif.

He was re-elected to the National Assembly as a candidate of Pakistan Tehreek-e-Insaf (PTI) from Constituency NA-194 (Rajanpur-II) in the 2018 Pakistani general election.

In September 2018, a deputy commissioner from Rajanpur accused Dreshak and his two sons of illegally interfering in transfers and postings of members of the Revenue Department and officials of the Border Military Police.

== Recent Controversy ==
In the 2022 flood, he was accused by locals of a town called Fazal Pur in his constituency that he diverted the water flow to save his orchards and factory and drowned the whole town.

== More Reading ==
- List of members of the 15th National Assembly of Pakistan
