= Dost Muhammad Mazari =

Pakistani politician (born 1970)

Sardar Dost Muhammad Mazari

Deputy Speaker of the Provincial Assembly of Punjab
- In office 16 August 2018 – 29 July 2022
- Speaker: Chaudhry Pervaiz Elahi
- Preceded by: Sardar Sher Ali Gorchani
- Succeeded by: Wasiq Qayyum Abbasi

Member of the Provincial Assembly of Punjab
- In office 15 August 2018 – 14 January 2023
- Constituency: PP-297 Rajanpur-V

Minister of State for Communications
- In office 22 June 2012 – 16 March 2013
- President: Asif Ali Zardari
- Prime Minister: Raja Pervaiz Ashraf

Parliamentary Secretary for Water and Power
- In office 2008–2012
- President: Asif Ali Zardari
- Prime Minister: Yusuf Raza Gillani

Member of the National Assembly of Pakistan
- In office 2008–2013
- Constituency: NA-175 (Rajanpur-II)

Personal details
- Born: August 15, 1980 (age 46) Karachi, Sindh, Pakistan
- Party: PMLN (2022-present)
- Other political affiliations: PTI (2018-2022); PMLN (2013-2018); PPP (2008-2013)
- Relations: Balakh Sher Mazari (grandfather); Sardar Riaz Mehmood Khan Mazari (uncle)

Sardar Dost Muhammad Mazari (born 15 August 1970) is a Pakistani politician who served as the Deputy Speaker of the Provincial Assembly of Punjab, from August 2018 to July 2022 before being removed via a motion of no confidence. He had been a member of the Provincial Assembly of Punjab from August 2018 till January 2023. Previously, he was a member of the National Assembly of Pakistan from 2008 to 2013. In 2024 Pakistani general election, he was defeated from Rajanpur by a Pakistan Tehreek-e-Insaf backed Independent Candidate.

== Early life and education ==
He was born on 15 August 1980 in Karachi into a Baloch family of the Mazari tribe to Major (R) Tariq Mehmood Mazari, while his grandfather Balakh Sher Mazari was also a politician, having served as the caretaker prime minister in 1993.

He graduated from the University of Karachi in 2002.

== Political career ==
=== Pakistan Peoples Party ===
He was elected to the National Assembly of Pakistan from Constituency NA-175 (Rajanpur-II) as a candidate of Pakistan Peoples Party (PPP) in the 2008 Pakistani general election. He received 78,427 votes and defeated Sardar Nasrullah Khan Dreshak.

He ran for the seat of the National Assembly from Constituency NA-175 (Rajanpur-II) as an independent candidate in the 2013 Pakistani general election but was unsuccessful. He received 73,885 votes and lost the seat to Hafeez Ur Rehman.

=== Pakistan Tehreek-e-Insaf ===
He was elected to the Provincial Assembly of the Punjab as a candidate of Pakistan Tehreek-e-Insaf (PTI) from Constituency PP-297 (Rajanpur-V) in the 2018 Pakistani general election. Following his successful election, PTI named him for the office of Deputy Speaker of the Punjab Assembly. On 16 August 2018, he was elected as Deputy Speaker of the Punjab Assembly. He received 187 votes against his opponent Malik Muhammad Waris Kallu who secured 159 votes.

On 6 April 2022, a no confidence motion was filed against him by his own party due to circumstances arising from the 2022 constitutional crisis in Punjab, Pakistan. The motion was tabled on 29 July 2022, which led to Mazari's removal by 186 votes.

=== Pakistan Muslim League (N) ===
On 22 May 2023, he made his announcement to join the Pakistan Muslim League (N) (PML(N)) after meeting with the Chief Organiser of the PML(N), Maryam Nawaz, and the Vice President of the PML(N), Pervaiz Rashid.
