= NA-187 Rajanpur-I =

Constituency of the National Assembly of Pakistan

- Constituency for the National Assembly of Pakistan
- Region: Jampur Tehsil (partly) including Jampur town of Rajanpur District
- Electorate: 395,237

Current constituency
- Party: Pakistan Muslim League (N)
- Member: Ammar Ahmed Khan Laghari
- Created from: NA-174 Rajanpur-I

NA-187 Rajanpur-I (این اے-187، راجن پُور-1) is a constituency for the National Assembly of Pakistan. It mainly includes the area of Jampur Tehsil. Before the 2018 delimitations, it also included the town of Fazilpur, but it has since been moved to the new NA-194 (Rajanpur-II).

== Election 2002 ==
General elections were held on 10 October 2002. Sardar Muhammad Jaffar Khan Leghari of National Alliance won by 59,783 votes.

General election 2002: NA-174 Rajanpur-I
Party	Candidate	Votes	%	±%
NA	Sardar Muhammad Jafar Khan Leghari	59,783	51.09	
PML(N)	Gorish Sardar Gurchani	32,920	28.13	
PPP	Zafarullah Khan Lund	13,460	11.50	
MMA	Muhammad Rafi Pachar	10,864	9.28	
Turnout		120,636	39.49	
Total valid votes		117,027	97.01	
Rejected ballots		3,609	2.99	
Majority		26,863	22.96	
Registered electors		305,453		

== Election 2008 ==
General elections were held on 18 February 2008. Sardar Muhammad Jaffar Khan Leghari of PML-Q won by 50,440 votes.

General election 2008: NA-174 Rajanpur-I
Party	Candidate	Votes	%	±%
PML(Q)	Sardar Muhammad Jafar Khan Leghari	50,440	38.67	
Independent	Sardar Nasrullah Khan Dreshak	40,049	30.70	
PPP	Khawaja Kaleem-Ud-Din Koreja	38,484	29.50	
Others	Others (three candidates)	1,482	1.13	
Turnout		135,829	46.45	
Total valid votes		130,455	96.04	
Rejected ballots		5,374	3.96	
Majority		10,391	7.97	
Registered electors		292,419		
PML(Q) gain from NA				

== Election 2013 ==
General elections were held on 11 May 2013. Sardar Muhammad Jaffar Khan Leghari of PML-N won by 101,705 votes and became the member of National Assembly.

General election 2013: NA-174 Rajanpur-I
Party	Candidate	Votes	%	±%
PML(N)	Sardar Muhammad Jafar Khan Leghari	101,705	48.19	
Independent	Sardar Nasrullah Khan Dreshak	61,863	29.31	
PPP	Khawaja Kaleem-Ud-Din Koreja	25,363	12.02	
Others	Others (thirteen candidates)	22,129	10.48	
Turnout		221,247	59.94	
Total valid votes		211,060	95.40	
Rejected ballots		10,187	4.60	
Majority		39,842	18.88	
Registered electors		369,102		
PML(N) gain from PML(Q)				

== Election 2018 ==
General elections are scheduled to be held on 25 July 2018.

General election 2018: NA-193 Rajanpur-I
Party	Candidate	Votes	%	±%
PTI	Sardar Muhammad Jaffar Khan Leghari	81,358	48.94	
Independent	Sardar Sher Ali Gorchani	46,748	28.12	
PPP	Shazia Abid	27,183	16.35	
Independent	Muhammad Mohsin Khan Leghari	4,111	2.47	
Independent	Sher Zaman	2,435	1.46	
Independent	Ali Ahmad Khan Leghari	1,401	0.84	
Independent	Sardar Adeel Hassan Khan Gorchani	1,357	0.82	
ARP	Shafqat Ullah	588	0.35	
Independent	Sardar Ali Raza Khan Dreshak	560	0.34	
Independent	Athar Hassan Khan Gorchani	503	0.30	
Turnout		173,132	55.76	
Total valid votes		166,244	96.02	
Rejected ballots		6,888	3.98	
Majority		32,506	20.82	
Registered electors		310,453		
PTI gain from PML(N)				

== By-election 2023 ==
A by-election was held on 26 February 2023 due to the death of Jaffar Khan Leghari, the previous MNA from this seat. Mohsin Leghari won this seat by a margin of 35,406 votes.

By-election 2023: NA-193 Rajanpur-I
Party	Candidate	Votes	%	±%
PTI	Muhammad Mohsin Khan Leghari	91,103	52.36	▲3.42
PML(N)	Ammar Ahmed Khan Laghari	55,697	32.01	N/A
PPP	Akhtar Hassan Khan Gorchani	20,074	11.54	▼4.81
TLP	Mahmood Ahmad	4,037	2.32	N/A
Others	Others (seven candidates)	3,067	1.76	N/A
Turnout		178,796	47.15	▼8.61
Total valid votes		173,978	97.31	▲1.29
Rejected ballots		4,818	2.69	▼1.29
Majority		35,406	20.35	▼0.47
Registered electors		379,204		
PTI hold		Swing	▲3.42	

== Election 2024 ==
General elections were held on 8 February 2024. Ammar Ahmed Khan Laghari won the election with 79,811 votes.

General election 2024: NA-187 Rajanpur-I
Party	Candidate	Votes	%	±%
PML(N)	Ammar Ahmed Khan Laghari	79,811	42.43	▲10.42
PTI	Muhammad Atif Ali Drishak (Note: Filed nomination papers as PTI candidate but ECP allowed him to run as an Independent)	67,321	35.79	▼16.57
PPP	Athar Hassan Khan Gorchani	18,299	9.73	▼1.81
IPP	Awais Dareshak	10,170	5.41	
Others	Others (fourteen candidates)	12,493	6.64	
Turnout		195,748	49.53	▲2.38
Total valid votes		188,094	96.09	
Rejected ballots		7,654	3.91	
Majority		12,490	6.64	
Registered electors		395,237		
PML(N) gain from PTI				

== See also ==
- NA-186 Dera Ghazi Khan-III
- NA-188 Rajanpur-II
