= Ismail Ahmedani =

- Born: Rajanpur District, now Pakistan
- Awards: The Khawaja Ghulam Farid Award given for writing Saraiki language literature in 1981, 1983 and 2011 by the Pakistan Academy of Letters, Government of Pakistan

Ismail Ahmedani (1930–2007) (اسماعیل احمدانی) was a Pakistani novelist and fiction writer.

== Life ==
Muhammad Ismail Ahmadani was born in 1930 near the village of Rasool Pur, in the then town of Rajanpur in Punjab, British India.

He wrote a travelogue named Peet de Pandh (travel of love).

== Awards and recognition ==
- Won three awards for his writings in 1981, 1983 and then again in 2011. He wrote his autobiography named Cheteya Diyaa Thavaa (places of memories).
- In 2011, he was again awarded 'The Khwaja Ghulam Farid Award' for literature for his autobiography.

== Published books ==
- Peet Dey Pandh(پیت دے پندہ) A travelogue from Sanghar to Fort Monroe (awarded in 1981), Publisher: Rasūlpūr, Z̤ilaʻ Ḍerah G̲h̲āzī K̲h̲ān : Siāʼeī Pablīkeshanz; Baḥāvalpūr : Milne kā patah, Siāʼeī Lāʼibrerī, (1980)
- Chuoliyan (چولیاں) A novel about Existentialism . (awarded in 1983)
- Amar Kahaani(امر کہانی) A novel
- Yadeen de kaak Mahal(یادین دی کاک محل) autobiography (awarded in 2011)

== Unpublished books ==
- Hakra wal wahse(حاکرا ول واسی) Drama
- Moona leza dii Murk(مونالیزا دی مرک) A collection of eleven fictions
