= Dajal Tehsil =

Dajal داجل
- Town
- Location within Pakistan Location within Punjab, Pakistan
- Coordinates: 29°33′34″N 70°22′33″E
- Country: Pakistan
- Province: Punjab
- Division: Dera Ghazi Khan
- District: Rajanpur
- Headquarters: Dajal
- Elevation: 120 m (390 ft)

Population (2022)
  - Total: 200,000
- Time zone: UTC+05:00 (PST)
- Calling code: 604

Daajal (داجل dājāl) is a Town in Rajanpur District in the Punjab province of Pakistan. It has a population of around 200,000.

== History ==
During the rule of Langahs in 1452, Islam Khan a relative of the Lodhi King of Delhi was in charge of the southern part of the Multan Province. Nahars overthrew the supremacy of Langah Sultanate spread over Punjab and the then Lodhi King of Delhi approved the act. Nahars annexed a greater part of Dera Ghazi Khan and charged upon the territory of Daajal and Harrand in the north. Their march was repelled by Miranis in 1482. Albeit the country around Harrand and Daajal inhabited by Gorchani and Lunds tribes was governed by the Khan of Kalat Mir Noori Naseer Khan Baloch for 70 years after defeating Ahmed Shah Abdali in 1758. The Khan of Kalat retained this tract of land until 1827.

Besides the area around Daajal and Harrand the Baloch tribes of Sulaiman Mountains including Marris, Bugtis and Kethrans are said to have been under nominal subjugation of Khan of Kalat though Qaisranis and Buzdars served as personal body guards of Khan of Kalat, but the Khan could never extend his direct sway over these tribes i.e. Qaisranis, Buzdars, Lunds, Babbars, Khosas, Legharis, Gorchanis and Mazaris inhabiting the mountainous tract from north of south

The country side of Harrand and Daajal came under the control of Khan of Kalat Mir Naseer Khan Baloch after defeating Ahmed Shah Abdali in Kalat Balochistan in 1758. This tract remained under the Khanate up till 1827. In 1827, the Nawab of Bhawalpur occupied the country of Daajal and Harrand for Sikh and thus the rule of Khan of Kalat came to an end over this area. Kabul, the British Government in 1838, at Lahore, ratified the treaty of 1834 between the Shah and the Maharajah.

By this treaty Shah Shuja renounced his claim to all jurisdiction over the province of Harrand Daajal, at that time still nominally in the Kalat Khanate. Soon after Ranjit Singh's death in 1839. no one having been- found fit to fill the place of that astute ruler, the whole of this part of the country fell into a state of anarchy. The Kalat Sardars, instigated, it is said, by the Khan, raided Harrand Daajal in retaliation for the conduct of the Sikh Government, and in their endeavour to recover the stolen province, all became anarchy and confusion throughout the Dera Ghazi Khan district.

The conquest of Sindh in 1843 and annexation of the Punjab in 1849 advanced our North-West Frontier across the Indus to the hills bordering Afghanistan and Kalat. In this connection one feature is distinctly noticeable. Prior to, the Tripartite Treaty of 1838 the Harrand and Daajal – including the Gurchanis, Mazaris, and certain Harris – was claimed by the Khan of Kalat.

== Administrative status ==
On the end of 2022 Punjab Govt gave the status of Tehsil to Dajal, in the newest created Jampur district in Dera Ghazi Khan Division.

== Irrigation system ==
=== Daajal Canal ===
The Daajal Canal is the main source of irrigation for the people of the area and for population of whole Rajanpur and Jampur District. It is drained from the Taunsa Barrage of the Indus River. It is an artificial watercourse in the country of Pakistan. Its center lies at a latitude of 29.5418000 and longitude of 70.3600000 and it has an elevation of 124 meters above sea level.

=== Rod Kohi ===
Major Rod Kohi areas traversed by hill torrents constitute nearly 65% of the total area of Pakistan and encompass entire Balochistan. Rod-Kohi or hill torrent cultivation is a unique system of agriculture being practiced in all the four provinces. People Living in Pachadh area store rod kohi water for the cultivation of crop. Every year in summer season rod kohi water effected the vast area of Daajal and pachad. Mostly people and animals lost their life. Government of Pakistan made small dams but due to the huge water flow all small dams were destroyed.

== Agriculture ==
The land of Dajal is very fertile in regard to agriculture. Cotton and wheat are generally produced in Dajal. Different vegetables are also grown there. Mangoes and dates are common fruits grown in this region.

== Harand Fort ==
Raja Harnacus" and his son Lok Bhagat had constructed the Fort of Harrand on the style of Monojodero. That is the reason structure of Harrand Fort seems contemporaneous civilization of Monojodero. Muslim rulers from Muhammad Bin Qasim to Ahmed Shah Abdali had maintained their sovereignty at this area. When the Region of Harrand was being ruled by Nadir. This fort was a route passage for Afghan-Iranian Invaders to Multan and India.

It is said that Alexander the Great passed through this area on his quest to conquer the world. Antiques found in this area point to Alexander's visit. According to local legend Alexander was inspired by the beauty of a local queen named Rukhsana and married her in Harand Fort. Locals say that the Unilever soap Rexona was named after her.

== Notable things ==
- Khir paray: A product made from milk.
- Mud Pots Gharay (water store pot) and Danwray are very famous.

=== Four Sufi Sultans ===
Daajal is also the place of four Sufi sultans and saints named Abharng Sultan, Sanghi Sultan and Ganwar Sultan. Bodla Bahar and Ameer Hamza Sultan is the most famous of all these. The Abharang Sultan Gathering (Mela) is a local festival. This festival (mela) starts from 1st Safar ul Muzzaffar to eight Safar ul Muzzaffar. People from nearby places come to see this maela. Chiragh are also lighted on the Tomb of Ahmad Abhrang Sultan.

== Marri ==
Marri is a hilly station in the Suliman Range, situated only few kilometres from Dajal (near the Lalgarh union council). Marri (Urdu: ماڑی) is a hill station in Rajanpur District, Punjab, Pakistan. Its altitude is approximately 4800 ft above from sea level. It is about 75 km (47 mi) away from Fazilpur, 116 km (72 mi) from Jampur, 100 km (62 mi) away from Rajanpur and 116 km (72 mi) from Mithankot. Beautiful site and newly built Road is also seeable.

Visitors can reach Marri from Fazilpur, Hajipur, Lalgarh and Dajal Road. It is also called Tumman-Gorchani. Because Gorchani tribe are living there. Chief of Gorchani tribe is Sardar Shehk Haidar Gorchani. People from Dajal and nearby area go to Marri in summer season.

== Roads and facilities ==
- Jampur Road and Muhammadpur Road: Daajal is connected with rest of the Punjab with Jampur Road and Muhammadpur Road. Jampur Road is the main route of communication.
- Harand Road: Harand Road connects Harand, the last union council of the Punjab, with Daajal. There is a gate called Darra which acts as a border between the Rajanpur district and tribal area of Balochistan.
- Dhandla Road: Dhandla Road connected the Northern Area of The city Basti Dhandla, Tal Shumali And many other villages Also Darkhast Jamal khan
- 'Jogiyani Road' : Jogiyani Road connects Basti Jogiyani and attached to Dhandhla Road and bypass road Daajal.
- Markets : Daajal has got three main commercial areas. The first one is Sadar Baazar Daajal, which serves as the main market. The second is market, at which primarily cloths and shoes are sold. The third commercial area is Harand Road. The Machian chowk is the main square of Daajal where can go on until 12 am.
- Schools: Daajal has five public primary schools, and a secondary school, for boys and girls each, and there are numerous private schools operating within the town and one a girls university.
- Banks: Two banks including the National Bank and the Muslim Commercial Bank of Pakistan operate branches in Daajal.
- Hospitals: Daajal has 10 bedded Rural Health Centres (RHC). However most of the medical facilities are provided by the private general practitioners clinics.
- Parks: Daajal has two parks one Children Park and other Majeed Jiskani Park but this time are under construction.
- Post office, police station and communications: Daajal has a post office, a police stations and a digital telephone exchange. PTCL broadband and Vfone internet facility are available in Daajal. Cable television is also available.
- Mobile network: All of Pakistan's main five cellular companies, Ufone, Mobilink, Zong, Warid Pakistan and Telenor, have their towers in Daajal.
- Water supply: Due to bitter soil water, a water supply scheme was started to drain drinkable water from Jampur to Daajal.

== Nearby places ==
- Jaan Muhammad Colony Nearby RHC Dajal
- Basti Shah Bakhsh jogiyani 3.1 km pari wala basti dal 2 km
- Tufki1. 9 km / 1.2 miles Hothi4.8 km / 3 miles Mayo1. 9 km / 1.2 miles Binda Burra 4.8 km / 3 miles Basti Miyo 1.9 km / 1.2 miles Onar 2.5 km / 1.5 miles Hoti 4.8 km

5.2 km / 3.2 miles

- Raqba Dhandlah 3.2 km / 2 miles Basti Hanbhi 5.2 km / 3.2 miles Raqba Dhandla 3.2 km / Raqba Dhandlah 3.2 km / 2 miles Basti Buchrah6.4 km / 4 miles 3.7 km / 2.3 miles
- Kotha jindo Khan / 3.5 miles
- bitah Ghulam Ali Khan /6.7 miles
- Buchara6.4 km / 4 miles
- Danwar3.7 km / 2.3 miles
- Patwali7.4 km / 4.6 miles
- Basti Qasab 3.7 km / 2.3 miles
- Basti Dhandlah 9.3 km / 5.8 miles
- Basti thamber 5.4 km north from daajal
- Isran 4 km / 2.5 miles
- Basti Dulle 4.3 km / 2.6 miles
- Basti Mahal Mahtam /7.2 km

== See also ==
- Dera Ghazi Khan
- Jampur
- Kotla Mughlan
- Muhammadpur Diwan
