= Awais Dareshak =

Pakistani politician

- اویس دریشک

Member of the Provincial Assembly of Punjab
- Incumbent
- Assumed office 24 February 2024
- Constituency: PP-296 Rajanpur-V
- In office 4 October 2018 – 14 January 2023
- Constituency: PP-296 Rajanpur-IV

Personal details
- Party: IPP (2024-present)
- Other political affiliations: PTI (2018-2024)

Awais Dareshak is a Pakistani politician who has been a member of the Provincial Assembly of Punjab since February 2024 and previously served in this position from October 2018 till January 2023.

== Political career ==
He was elected unopposed to the Provincial Assembly of Punjab as a candidate of the Pakistan Tehreek-e-Insaf (PTI) from PP-296 (Rajanpur-IV) in a by-election held in September 2018.

He contested the 2024 Pakistani general election from NA-187 Rajanpur-I as an independent candidate. He received 10,170 votes and was defeated by Ammar Ahmed Khan Laghari, a candidate of Pakistan Muslim League (N) (PML(N)). However, he was re-elected to the Provincial Assembly of the Punjab from PP-296 Rajanpur-V as an independent candidate supported by PTI in the 2024 Punjab provincial election. He received 42,772 votes and defeated Muhammad Yousaf Dareshak, a candidate of PML(N).

On 14 February 2024, despite his PTI affiliation, he joined Istehkam-e-Pakistan Party (IPP).
