= Akhtar Hassan Khan Gorchani =

Pakistani diplomat, politician and former intelligence official

Director General of the Intelligence Bureau
- In office July 2012 – March 2013
- Preceded by: Javed Noor
- Succeeded by: Aftab Sultan

Personal details
- Born: 1 August 1955 (age 71) Lalgarh, Rajanpur, Punjab, Pakistan
- Party: TLP (2025-present)
- Other political affiliations: PPP (2022-2024)
- Relations: Athar Hassan Khan Gorchani (son)

Akhtar Hassan Khan Gorchani (born 1 August 1955) is a Pakistani diplomat, politician, and former intelligence official. He graduated from Government College, Lahore in 1976. He sat in the competitive exam for the Central Superior Services in November 1980. He was assigned to the Police Service of Pakistan.

== Bureaucratic career ==
During his tenure in the police, he received a Bachelor of Law degree and a Master of Arts degree in Political Science. He served in various capacities in the provinces of the Punjab and Sindh. As Assistant Superintendent of Police, he was posted at Tank, Layyah, Jhang, and Wazirabad. As Superintendent (SP) and Senior Superintendent (SSP), he served as SP-Punjab Constabulary, Additional SP Multan; SP Lodhran; SP Traffic (Highways), Multan; SSP Sukkur, Jacobabad, Hyderabad, Thatta, Gujranwala, Karachi West; and Deputy Director of FIA in Rawalpindi and Faisalabad.

In 2003 he joined Pakistan's delegation to the United Nations peace mission in Kosovo. After returning to Pakistan, he held posts as Deputy Inspector General of Police, Larkana and Regional Police Officer Multan before being appointed the police chief in Karachi. In July 2012, he was named Director General of the Intelligence Bureau. Soon afterwards, he became Minister for Community Affairs at the Embassy of Pakistan in Washington D.C.

He is the author of "The Sindh Police, brief history & developments", published by Oxford University Press in 2007.

== Political career ==
On 18 May 2022, both Gorchani and his son, Athar Hassan Khan Gorchani, who is a former member of the Provincial Assembly of the Punjab, joined the Pakistan People's Party (PPP).

He ran for the National Assembly of Pakistan from NA-193 Rajanpur-I in a 2023 by-election as a candidate of the PPP. He received 20,074 votes and was defeated by Muhammad Mohsin Khan Leghari, a candidate of the Pakistan Tehreek-e-Insaf (PTI).
