= NA-175 (Rajanpur-II) =

Former constituency of the National Assembly of Pakistan

Constituency NA-175 (Rajanpur-II)
- Former constituency for the National Assembly of Pakistan
- Region: Rajanpur District

Former constituency
- Created: 2002
- Abolished: 2018
- Replaced by: NA-194 (Rajanpur-II); NA-195 (Rajanpur-III)

Constituency NA-175 (Rajanpur-II) (Urdu: ۲-این اے-۱۷۵، راجن پُور) was a constituency for the National Assembly of Pakistan. It comprised Rajanpur Tehsil and Rojhan Tehsil. After the 2018 delimitations, this constituency's areas were bifurcated between the new constituencies of NA-194 and NA-195.

== Election 2002 ==
General elections were held on 10 October 2002. Sardar Nasrullah Khan Dreshak an independent candidate won by 69,030 votes.

General election 2002: NA-175 Rajanpur-II
Party	Candidate	Votes	%	±%
Independent	Sardar Nasrullah Khan Dreshak	69,030	59.25	
Independent	Sardar Khalid Bashir Mazari	38,127	32.73	
PPP	Sarwar Abbas	8,604	7.39	
Others	Others (two candidates)	745	0.63	
Turnout		120,010	41.08	
Total valid votes		116,506	97.08	
Rejected ballots		3,504	2.92	
Majority		30,903	26.52	
Registered electors		292,109		

== Election 2008 ==
General elections were held on 18 February 2008. Dost Muhammad Mazari of PPP won by 78,427 votes.

General election 2008: NA-175 Rajanpur-II
Party	Candidate	Votes	%	±%
PPP	Mir Dost Muhammad Khan Mazari	78,427	59.32	
PML(Q)	Sardar Nasrullah Khan Dreshak	46,210	34.95	
Independent	Sardar Muhammad Awais Dreshak	4,802	3.63	
Others	Others (two candidates)	2,775	2.10	
Turnout		137,787	48.29	
Total valid votes		132,214	95.96	
Rejected ballots		5,573	4.04	
Majority		32,217	24.37	
Registered electors		285,365		

== Election 2013 ==
General elections were held on 11 May 2013. Dr. Hafeez-ur-Rehman Dreshak of PML-N won by 110,573 votes and became the member of National Assembly.

General election 2013: NA-175 Rajanpur-II
Party	Candidate	Votes	%	±%
PML(N)	Dr. Hafeez Ur Rehman Khan	110,573	51.51	
Independent	Mir Dost Muhammad Khan Mazari	73,885	34.42	
PTI	Khawaja Sharif Muhammad Koreja	13,805	6.43	
PPP	Sardar Jahazeb Khan Drishak Almarof Chand Khan	6,581	3.07	
Independent	Ghulam Nazik Solangi	3,085	1.44	
Others	Others (nine candidates)	6,742	3.13	
Turnout		228,729	64.40	
Total valid votes		214,671	93.85	
Rejected ballots		14,058	6.15	
Majority		36,688	17.09	
Registered electors		355,184		
