= Rasool Pur, Rajanpur =

Rasool Pur رسول پور
- Village
- Interactive map of Rasool Pur
- Coordinates: 29°34′46″N 70°32′12″E
- Country: Pakistan
- Province: Punjab
- District: Rajanpur
- Tehsil: Jampur
- Elevation: 107 m (351 ft)

Population (2017)
  - Total: 5,549
- Time zone: UTC+5 (PKT)

Rasool Pur (Urdu: رسول پور) is a village located in Jampur Tehsil of Rajanpur district in the Punjab province of Pakistan. It is situated 59.5 kilometres (37.0 mi) north from Rajanpur on Indus Highway.

Rasool Pur is considered a model village, as the whole village is a no-smoking zone, and has been reported to have a 100 percent literacy rate and zero crime rate in last 100 years. The village has its own Rasool Pur Development Society, responsible for collection of donations for people who cannot afford education. The society also makes sure that no one drops out of school.

However, census data from the 2017 Pakistan Census has shown that the actual literacy rate of Rasool Pur is 69.92% (76.94% among men, 62.79% among women). While this is far higher than the district average of 33.75%, it isn't unanimous.

== History ==
People of the village belong to Ahmedani tribe of Baloch people who settled at this location in 1933-34 after being displaced five times due to floods at other locations since early nineteenth century. People of village built their first primary schools for boys and girls in 1935 for which funding was exclusively provided by the inhabitants of the village themselves.
