= Harand =

Harand may refer to:

- Harand, Iran
- Harand, Pakistan
