= Tahir Khan =

Tahir Khan may refer to:

- Tahir Khan (Pakistani cricketer) (born 1981)
- Tahir Khan (Afghan cricketer) (born 1997)
- Tahir Khan Nahar, a 15th/16th-century local ruler of Sitpur in Punjab during the Delhi Sultanate period
- Taiyr Khan, Kazakh ruler of the Kazakh Khanate (b. ?-d. 1533, r. 1523-1533)
