= PP-294 Rajanpur-III =

Constituency of the Punjabi Provincial Legislature, Pakistan

- Provincial constituency for the Provincial Assembly of Punjab
- Region: Tribal Area (partly), Rajanpur Tehsil (partly) and Jampur Tehsil (partly) of Rajanpur District

Current constituency
- Party: Pakistan Muslim League (N)
- Member: Sardar Pervaiz Iqbal Gorchani
- Created from: PP-248 Rajanpur-II (2002-2018); PP-294 Rajanpur-II (2018-2023)

PP-294 Rajanpur-III (پی پی-294، راجن پُور-3) is a Constituency of Provincial Assembly of Punjab.

== General elections 2024 ==
Provincial election 2024: PP-294 Rajanpur-III
Party	Candidate	Votes	%	±%
PML(N)	Sardar Pervaiz Iqbal Gorchani	43,656	48.38	
Independent	Atif Ali Khan Dareshak (Note: Filed nomination papers as PTI candidate but ECP allowed him to run as an Independent)	30,530	33.83	
PPP	Muhammad Akhtar	7,427	8.23	
JI	Muhammad Irfan Ullah	5,564	6.17	
Others	Others (ten candidates)	3,058	3.39	
Turnout		94,708	48.72	
Total valid votes		90,235	95.28	
Rejected ballots		4,473	4.72	
Majority		13,126	14.55	
Registered electors		194,392		
hold				

== General elections 2018 ==
Provincial election 2018: PP-294 Rajanpur-II
Party	Candidate	Votes	%	±%
PTI	Sardar Hasnain Bahadur Khan Dreshak	41,618	42.25	
Independent	Athar Hassan Khan Gurchani	26,539	26.94	
PPP	Nasrullah	17,781	18.05	
Independent	Allah Nawaz Khan	4,518	4.59	
PML(N)	Sardar Hassam Javaid Khan Gorchani	4,230	4.29	
Independent	Sher Zaman	1,276	1.30	
Others	Others (six candidates)	2,546	2.59	
Turnout		102,979	56.48	
Total valid votes		98,508	95.66	
Rejected ballots		4,471	4.34	
Majority		15,079	15.31	
Registered electors		182,324		

== General elections 2013 ==
Provincial election 2013: PP-248 Rajanpur-II
Party	Candidate	Votes	%	±%
PML(N)	Sardar Sher Ali Gorchani	48,090	44.08	
Independent	Sardar Hasnain Bahadur	35,310	32.37	
PPP	Sardar Ather Hassan Khan Gorchani	19,616	17.98	
PTI	Sardar Naveed Gul Khan	1,794	1.64	
JI	Abdul Mohsin	1,496	1.37	
Others	Others (eleven candidates)	2,791	2.56	
Turnout		114,539	63.57	
Total valid votes		109,097	95.25	
Rejected ballots		5,442	4.75	
Majority		12,780	11.71	
Registered electors		180,175		

== General elections 2008 ==
Contesting candidates	Party affiliation	Votes polled

== See also ==
- PP-293 Rajanpur-II
- PP-295 Rajanpur-IV
