= Wasiq =

Wasiq is both a given name and a surname. Notable people with the name include:

- Wasiq Qayyum Abbasi (born 1987), Pakistani politician
- Wasiq Khan (born 1975), Indian production designer
- Abdul Haq Wasiq (born 1971), Director of Intelligence of the Islamic Emirate of Afghanistan
- Ahmadullah Wasiq (fl. 2020), Afghan politician
