= Asni, Pakistan =

Coordinates: 29°01′N 70°15′E

Asni (also spelled Aasni) is located in Rajanpur, Punjab, Pakistan. It is at 29:01N, 70:15E, is a historic town located at the foot of Sulaiman hills, approximately 10-12 miles west of the Indus river in the Rajanpur district. Mithankot, Rajanpur and Umerkot are the large towns within the 10 to 15 miles from Asni.

== History ==
In Hindu mythology, Asni was the āsan (place or seat) of Rājā Rāsālu, the mythical king of Punjab (Imperial Gazetteer of India, 1901). Prior to 1947, Dreshak tribe of Balochs dominated the population of the town.

Asni has been the stronghold of Dreshak Sardars after the British were driven out from here. This is the village that the British had a fortress and after they had left it has been the stronghold of Dreshak Balochi tribe. It has about 3 square meters of land which is the most fertile land.
