= NA-175 =

NA-175 may refer to:

- NA-175 (Rahim Yar Khan-I), a constituency of the National Assembly of Pakistan
- NA-175 (Rajanur-II), a former constituency of the National Assembly of Pakistan
