= Kotla Mughlan =

Coordinates: 29°33′N 70°36′E

- union council
- Interactive map of Kotla Mughlan
- Country: Pakistan
- Region: (Punjab, Pakistan) Punjab
- Division: Dera Ghazi Khan
- District: Rajanpur
- Tehsil: Jampur
- Time zone: UTC+5 (PST)
  - Summer (DST): UTC+6 (PDT)

Kotla Mughlan is a union council of Jampur Tehsil, Rajanpur District, Pakistan.

== Geography ==
It is situated 10 kilometers southeast of Jampur. It is at the edge of the Indus river. Haero lies to the east, Muhammad Pur is to the west, Kotla Dewaan is to the north and Boola Wala is to the south.

== Demographics ==
Mostly people speak Saraiki language there, along with Punjabi and Balochi is also

== Education ==
Two government high schools, one for girls and one for boys, as well as many private schools are present. Iqra Public Elementary School Aqsa Model Public School Kot Bodla

== Medical facilities ==
A hospital provides medical facilities to the people, along with private clinics. A veterinary clinic is also available.

== Economy ==
Agriculture and farming is the primary occupation.

== See also ==
- Dera Ghazi Khan
- Punjab, Pakistan
