= PP-297 Rajanpur-VI =

Constituency of the Punjabi Provincial Legislature, Pakistan

- Constituency for the Provincial Assembly of Punjab
- Region: Tribal Area (partly) and Rojhan Tehsil (partly) including Rojhan Town of Rajanpur District

Current constituency
- Party: TBD
- Member: Vacant
- Created from: PP-250 Rajanpur-IV (2002-2018); PP-297 Rajanpur-V (2018-2023)

PP-297 Rajanpur-VI (پی پی-297، راجن پُور-6) is a Constituency of Provincial Assembly of Punjab.

== General elections 2024 ==
Provincial election 2024: PP-297 Rajanpur-VI
Party	Candidate	Votes	%	±%
PML(N)	Khizer Hussain Mazari	39,532	44.64	
PML(Q)	Sardar Dost Muhammad Khan Mazari	31,731	35.83	
PTI	Zahid Khan Mazari (Note: Filed nomination papers as PTI candidate but ECP allowed him to run as an Independent)	9,364	10.57	
Others	Others (fourteen candidates)	7,941	8.96	
Turnout		93,494	48.90	
Total valid votes		88,568	94.73	
Rejected ballots		4,926	5.27	
Majority		7,801	8.81	
Registered electors		191,176		
PML(N) gain from PTI				

== General elections 2018 ==
Provincial election 2018: PP-297 Rajanpur-V
Party	Candidate	Votes	%	±%
PTI	Mir Dost Muhammad Khan Mazari	56,579	57.97	
PML(N)	Sardar Atif Khan Mazari	37,468	38.39	
PPP	Rahim Bakhsh	1,999	2.05	
Independent	Taufeeq Haider Mazari	1,258	1.29	
Others	Others (two candidates)	296	0.31	
Turnout		101,692	62.64	
Total valid votes		97,600	95.98	
Rejected ballots		4,092	4.02	
Majority		19,111	19.58	
Registered electors		162,351		

== General elections 2013 ==
Provincial election 2013: PP-250 Rajanpur-IV
Party	Candidate	Votes	%	±%
PML(N)	Sardar Atif Hussain Khan Mazari	54,876	51.71	
Independent	Zahid Mahmood Khan Mazari	39,169	36.91	
PTI	Rafiq Azam Khan Mazari	5,309	5.00	
PPP	Rao Zulfiqar Ali Advocate	1,521	1.43	
Independent	Ghaus Bux Khan Mazari	1,107	1.04	
Others	Others (thirteen candidates)	4,140	3.90	
Turnout		113,210	63.59	
Total valid votes		106,122	93.74	
Rejected ballots		7,088	6.26	
Majority		15,707	14.80	
Registered electors		178,019		

== General elections 2008 ==
Contesting candidates	Party affiliation	Votes polled

== See also ==
- PP-296 Rajanpur-V
- PP-1 Attock-I
