= PP-292 Rajanpur-I =

Constituency of the Punjabi Provincial Legislature, Pakistan

- Constituency for the Provincial Assembly of Punjab
- Region: Tribal Area (partly) and Jampur Tehsil (partly) including Dajal Town of Jampur District

Current constituency
- Party: Pakistan Muslim League (N)
- Member: Sardar Sher Afgan Khan Gurchani
- Created from: PP-247 Rajanpur-I (2002-2018); PP-293 Rajanpur-I (2018-2023)

PP-292 Rajanpur-I (پی پی-292، راجن پُور-1) is a Constituency of Provincial Assembly of Punjab.

== General elections 2024 ==
Provincial election 2024: PP-292 Rajanpur-I
Party	Candidate	Votes	%	±%
PML(N)	Sardar Sher Afghan Khan Gorchani	38,923	42.64	
Independent	Ahmad Nawaz (Note: Filed)	24,364	26.69	
Independent	Zulfiqar Ahmad	10,160	11.13	
PPP	Asad Ameen	9,328	10.22	
JI	Abdul Ghaffar	2,730	2.99	
Others	Others (thirteen candidates)	5,780	6.33	
Turnout		94,802	46.18	
Total valid votes		91,285	96.29	
Rejected ballots		3,517	3.71	
Majority		14,559	15.95	
Registered electors		205,300		
hold				

== General elections 2018 ==
Provincial election 2018: PP-293 Rajanpur-I
Party	Candidate	Votes	%	±%
PTI	Muhammad Moshin Leghari	45,146	44.23	
Independent	Sardar Sher Ali Gurchani	33,505	32.83	
PPP	Subtain Sarwar	15,648	15.33	
MMA	Mehmood Ahmad	2,601	2.55	
Independent	Ali Ahmad Khan Leghari	1,612	1.58	
Independent	Ishfaq Qadir Leghari	1,335	1.31	
Others	Others (three candidates)	2,221	2.18	
Turnout		105,634	55.20	
Total valid votes		102,068	96.62	
Rejected ballots		3,566	3.38	
Majority		11,641	11.40	
Registered electors		191,385		

== General elections 2013 ==
Provincial election 2013: PP-247 Rajanpur-I
Party	Candidate	Votes	%	±%
PML(N)	Mian Muhammad Shehbaz Sharif	56,197	54.58	
Independent	Dreeshak Sardar Ali Raza Khan Dreshak	25,567	24.83	
PPP	Waqas Naveed Khan Gorchani	9,535	9.26	
PTI	Mirza Abdul Karim	4,070	3.95	
Independent	Zafrullaha Khan	2,728	2.65	
JI	Munir Ahmad Qureshi	2,110	2.05	
Others	Others (sixteen candidates)	2,756	2.68	
Turnout		106,838	56.55	
Total valid votes		102,963	96.37	
Rejected ballots		3,875	3.63	
Majority		30,630	29.75	
Registered electors		188,927		

== General elections 2008 ==
Contesting candidates	Party affiliation	Votes polled

== See also ==
- PP-292 Dera Ghazi Khan-V
- PP-293 Rajanpur-II
