= Shazia Abid =

Pakistani politician

Member of the Provincial Assembly of the Punjab
- Incumbent
- Assumed office 27 February 2024
- Constituency: Reserved seat for women
- In office 15 August 2018 – 14 January 2023
- Constituency: Reserved seat for women

Personal details
- Party: PPP (2008-present)

Shazia Abid is a Pakistani politician who is an incumbent member of the Provincial Assembly of the Punjab since 27 February 2024. Previously she had been a member of the Provincial Assembly of the Punjab from August 2018 till January 2023.

== Political career ==
In the 2018 Pakistani general election, she ran for the seat of the National Assembly of Pakistan as a candidate of Pakistan Peoples Party (PPP) from Constituency NA-193 (Rajanpur-I) but was unsuccessful. She received 27,170 votes and lost the seat to Jaffar Khan Leghari. Following the election, she was elected to the Provincial Assembly of the Punjab as a candidate of PPP on a reserved seat for women.

In the 2024 Pakistani general election, she secured a seat again in the Provincial Assembly of the Punjab through a reserved quota for women as a candidate of Pakistan People's Party (PPP).
