= Shamsher Ali Mazari =

Member of the National Assembly of Pakistan from Rajanpur (2024–2029)

- شمشیر علی مزاری

Member of the National Assembly of Pakistan
- Incumbent
- Assumed office 29 February 2024
- Constituency: NA-189 Rajanpur-III

Personal details
- Party: PMLN (2024-present)

Shamsher Ali Mazari (Urdu: شمشیر علی مزاری) is a Pakistani politician who has been a member of the National Assembly of Pakistan since February 2024.

== Political career ==
Mazari was elected to the National Assembly of Pakistan in the 2024 Pakistani general election from NA-189 Rajanpur-III as an Independent candidate. He received 83,628 votes while runner up Sardar Riaz Mehmood Khan Mazari of Pakistan Muslim League (N) (PML(N)) received 73,394 votes. He joined PML(N) after his election.
