= Malik Muhammad Waris Kallu =

Pakistani politician (1951–2021)

Member of the Provincial Assembly of the Punjab
- In office 2002–2021

Personal details
- Born: November 1, 1951 Khushab District, Punjab, Pakistan
- Died: March 12, 2021 (age 70)
- Party: Pakistan Muslim League (N)

Punjab Assembly Lahore

Malik Muhammad Waris Kallu (Punjabi, Urdu: ملک محمد وارث کلو; November 1, 1951 – March 12, 2021), also known by the name of Waris Shad, was a Pakistani politician from Khushab District. who was a Member of the Provincial Assembly of the Punjab, from 2002 to 12 March 2021.

== Early life and education ==
Waris Kallu was born in Khushab District. He got the degree of Bachelor of Arts and the degree of Bachelor of Laws in 1976 from Punjab University Law College. He passed CSS examination in 1982.

== Political career ==
He started his political career under the mentorship of ex provincial minister Malik Khuda Baksh Tiwana and his independent "Awami group". He was considered to be the right-hand man of the senior minister as he introduced him into politics of Khushab as Mr. Kallu had no previous history in politics and worked in a bank. He was elected to the Provincial Assembly of the Punjab as an independent candidate from Constituency PP-42 (Khushab-IV) in the 2002 Pakistani general election. He received 41,863 votes and defeated Sardar Shuja Muhammad Khan, a candidate of Pakistan Muslim League (Q) (PML-Q).

He was re-elected to the Provincial Assembly of the Punjab as an independent candidate of Awami group from Constituency PP-42 (Khushab-IV) in the 2008 Pakistani general election. He received 42,093 votes and defeated Syed Zulqarnain Shah, an independent candidate, Syed Zulqarnain Shah. However, after winning the elections under Awami group's platform the 2008 elections, he left his political mentor Malik Khuda Baksh Tiwana and joined the rival group of Malik Shakir Basheer Awan. Since 2008, he has been a critic of Tiwanas i.e. the people who taught him politics and in 2013 contested elections against them. He was re-elected to the Provincial Assembly of the Punjab as a candidate of Pakistan Muslim League (N) (PML-N) from Constituency PP-42 (Khushab-IV) in the 2013 Pakistani general election. He received 50,616 votes on PMLN ticket and defeated an independent candidate, Malik Khuda Bukhsh Tiwana who received 50,148 votes. The results of this election remain controversial as despite winning by a narrow margin of 300 votes, there was no re counting. His rivals accuse him of rigging and the case was won by Malik waris kallu with his son Barrister Moazzam sher kallu in The Supreme Court of the Pakistan.

He was re-elected to the Provincial Assembly of the Punjab as a candidate of PML-N from Constituency PP-84 (Khushab-III) in the 2018 Pakistani general election. Following his successful election, PML-N named him for the office of Deputy Speaker of the Punjab Assembly. On 16 August 2018, he received 159 votes and lost the seat to Dost Muhammad Mazari who secured 187 votes.

He was re-elected to Provincial Assembly of the Punjab as a candidate of PML-N from Constituency PP-84 (Khushab-III) in the 2018 Pakistani general election. He died on 12 March 2021 And his son Barrister Moazzam sher kallu was elected as the member of the Provincial Assembly of the Punjab.
