= Sardar Hasnain Bahadar Dreshak =

Pakistani politician

Sardar Husnain Bahadar Dreshak

Provincial Minister of Punjab for Livestock and Dairy Development
- In office 6 September 2018 – April 2022

Member of the Provincial Assembly of the Punjab
- In office 15 August 2018 – 14 January 2023
- Constituency: PP-294 Rajanpur-II

Personal details
- Born: June 29, 1974 (age 52) Lahore, Punjab, Pakistan
- Party: PTI (2018-present)
- Parent: Sardar Nasrullah Khan Dreshak (father)

Sardar Hasnain Bahadar Dreshak is a Pakistani politician who was the provincial minister of Punjab for livestock and dairy development, in office since 6 September 2018 till April 2022. He had been a member of the Provincial Assembly of the Punjab from August 2018 till January 2023.

== Early life and education ==
He was born on 29 June 1974 to Sardar Nasrullah Khan Dreshak in Lahore, Pakistan.

He received degree of Bachelor of Science in engineering (electronics) in 1996 from the College of Electrical and Mechanical Engineering.

== Political career ==
He was elected to the Provincial Assembly of the Punjab as an independent candidate from PP-248 (Rajanpur-II) in the 2002 Punjab provincial election. He received 28,070 votes and defeated Shahid Haider Khan Gorchani, a candidate of the Pakistan Muslim League (N) (PML-N).

He was re-elected to the Provincial Assembly of the Punjab as a candidate of the Pakistan Tehreek-e-Insaf (PTI) from PP-294 (Rajanpur-II) in the 2018 Punjab provincial election.

On 27 August 2018, he was inducted into the provincial Punjab cabinet of Chief Minister Usman Buzdar without any ministerial portfolio. On 6 September 2018, he was appointed Provincial Minister of Punjab for Livestock and Dairy Development.

In September 2018, a deputy commissioner from Rajanpur accused Dreshak, his brother and his father of illegally interfering in transfers and postings of members of Revenue Department and officials of the Border Military Police.

He ran for a seat in the Provincial Assembly from PP-294 Rajanpur-II as a candidate of the PTI in the 2023 Punjab provincial election.
