= PP-291 Dera Ghazi Khan-VI =

Constituency of the Punjabi Provincial Legislature, Pakistan

- Constituency for the Provincial Assembly of Punjab
- Region: Kot Chutta Tehsil (partly) including Mana Ahmadani town and Tribal area of Dera Ghazi Khan District

Current constituency
- Member: Muhammad Ahmed Khan Laghari (Pakistan Muslim League (N)
- Created from: PP-245 Dera Ghazi Khan-VI and PP-246 Dera Ghazi Khan-VII (2002-2018); PP-287 Dera Ghazi Khan-I (2018-2023)

PP-291 Dera Ghazi Khan-VI (پی پی-291، ڈيره غازى خان-6) is a Constituency of Provincial Assembly of Punjab.

== General elections 2024 ==
Provincial election 2024: PP-291 Dera Ghazi Khan-VI
Party	Candidate	Votes	%	±%
PML(N)	Muhammad Ahmed Khan Leghari	38,646	43.36	
Independent	Muhammad Fahim Saeed (Note: Filed nomination papers as PTI candidate but ECP allowed him to run as an Independent)	37,271	41.82	
PPP	Muhammad Ramzan Qadir	7,720	8.66	
JI	Wahid Bakhsh	2,480	2.78	
Others	Others (twelve candidates)	3,016	3.38	
Turnout		91,594	47.45	
Total valid votes		89,133	97.31	
Rejected ballots		2,461	2.69	
Majority		1,375	1.54	
Registered electors		193,044		
hold				

== General elections 2018 ==
Provincial election 2018: PP-292 Dera Ghazi Khan-VIII
Party	Candidate	Votes	%	±%
PTI	Sardar Muhammad Khan Laghari	32,316	46.87	
PML(N)	Awais Ahmad Khan Leghari	32,104	46.56	
PPP	Ali Muhammad	3,552	5.15	
Others	Others (three candidates)	976	1.41	
Turnout		71,713	50.82	
Total valid votes		68,948	96.14	
Rejected ballots		2,765	3.86	
Majority		212	0.31	
Registered electors		141,114		

== General elections 2013 ==
Provincial election 2013: PP-246 Dera Ghazi Khan-VII
Party	Candidate	Votes	%	±%
Independent	Mehmood Qadir Khan	32,105	41.86	
PPP	Major Rtd Malik Muhammad Rashid Kamran Malana	20,889	27.24	
PTI	Shah Nawaz Khan Chandia Advocate	8,674	11.31	
PST	Syed Muhammad Baqir Shah	7,225	9.42	
PML(N)	Ishfaq Ahmad	2,057	2.68	
JUI (F)	Moulana Muhammad Iqbal	1,405	1.83	
JI	Ejaz Ahmad Khan	1,293	1.69	
Others	Others (twelve candidates)	3,042	3.97	
Turnout		79,919	55.20	
Total valid votes		76,690	95.96	
Rejected ballots		3,229	4.04	
Majority		11,216	14.62	
Registered electors		144,793		

== General elections 2008 ==
Contesting candidates	Party affiliation	Votes polled

== See also ==
- PP-291 Dera Ghazi Khan-IV
- PP-292 Rajanpur-I
