= Tomb of Tahir Khan Nahar =

14th-century mausoleum in Pakistan

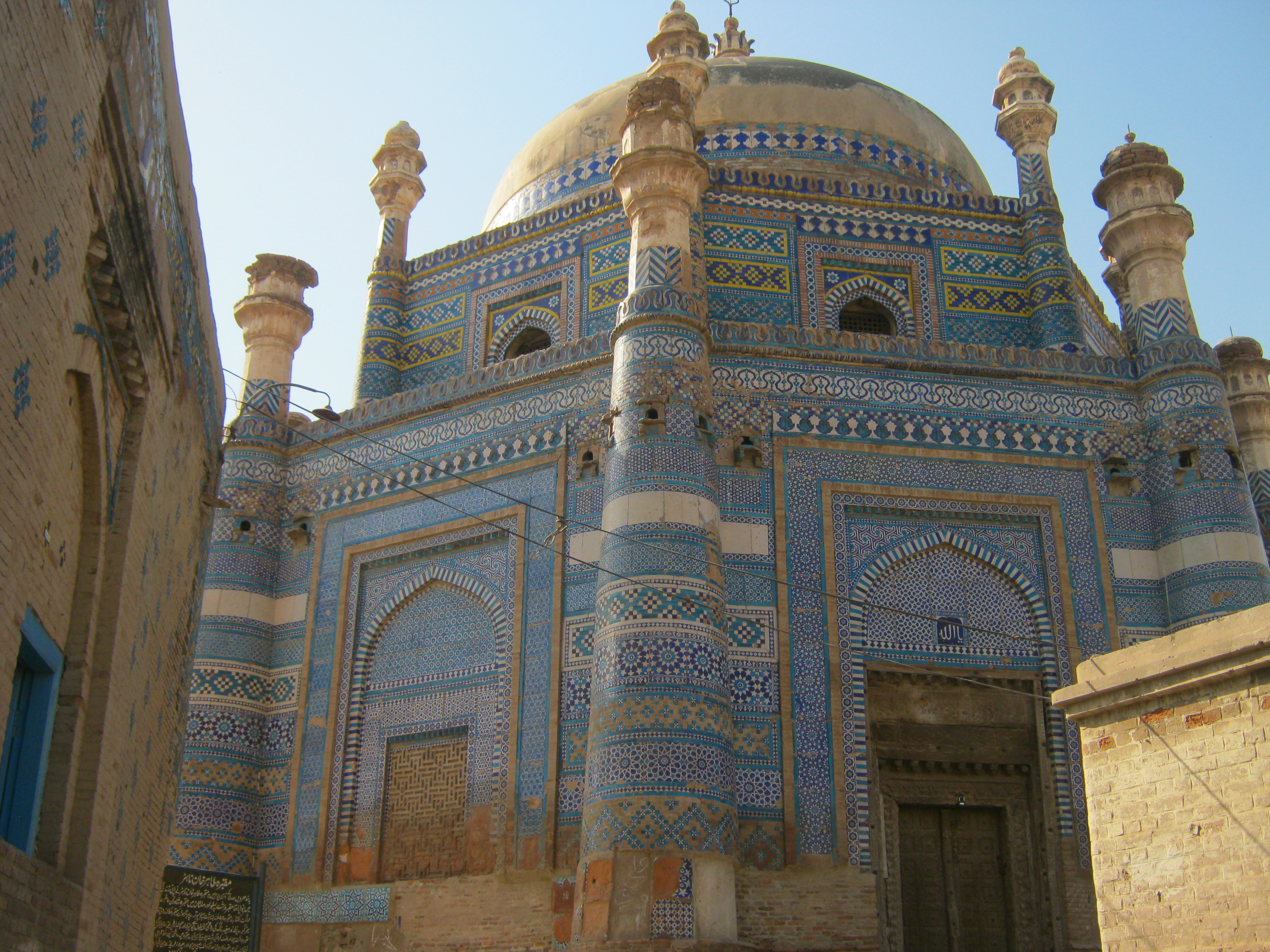
Tomb of Tahir Khan Nahar

Tomb of Tahir Khan Nahar (Urdu: مقبرہ طاہر خان ناہڑ) is situated at Seetpur, Muzaffargarh District, Punjab, Pakistan. This tomb is protected by the Federal Government of Pakistan.

The tomb is located in central Seetpur, a town in southern Punjab near the confluence of the Indus and Chenab rivers. Tahir Khan Nahar built the present tomb and mosque at Seetpur in his lifetime, at the close of 15th century CE. The tomb bears a close resemblance to the tomb of Shah Rukn-e-Alam at Multan that was built around 1320. The tomb has three stories.

== See also ==
- Shahi Mosque, Seetpur
