= Shahi Mosque, Seetpur =

Mosque in Punjab, Pakistan

- شاہی مسجد سیت پور
- The Shahi Mosque of Seetpur, with the tomb of Tahir Khan Nahar in background

Religion
- Affiliation: Islam
- Ecclesiastical or organizational status: Mosque
- Status: Active

Location
- Location: Sitpur, Punjab
- Country: Pakistan

Architecture
- Type: Mosque architecture
- Groundbreaking: 1530
- Dome: Three

Shahi Masjid, also known as Tahir Khan Nahar Mosque, is an early 16th century mosque located in the town of Sitpur, in Punjab, Pakistan. It is situated on the southeast corner of the tomb of Tahir Khan Nahar, who is also believed to have built the mosque, in 1530.
