= Ammar Ahmed Khan Laghari =

Member of the National Assembly of Pakistan from Rajanpur (2024–2029)

- عمار احمد خان لغاری

Member of the National Assembly of Pakistan
- Incumbent
- Assumed office 29 February 2024
- Constituency: NA-187 Rajanpur-I

Personal details
- Party: PMLN (2023-present)
- Parent: Awais Leghari (father)

Ammar Ahmed Khan Laghari (Urdu: عمار احمد خان لغاری) is a Pakistani politician who has been a member of the National Assembly of Pakistan since February 2024.

== Political career ==
Laghari contested from NA-193 Rajanpur-I as a candidate of Pakistan Muslim League (N) in a February 2023 by-election, but was unsuccessful. He received 55,697 votes and was defeated by Muhammad Mohsin Khan Leghari, a candidate of Pakistan Tehreek-e-Insaf (PTI).

He was elected to the National Assembly of Pakistan in the 2024 Pakistani general election from NA-187 Rajanpur-I as a candidate of PML(N). He received 79,811 votes while runner-up Atif Ali Dareshak, an Independent politician candidate supported by PTI, received 67,321 votes.
