= Jaffar Khan Leghari =

Pakistani politician (1941–2022)

- جعفر خان لغاری

Member of the National Assembly
- In office 30 October 2002 – 31 May 2018
- Preceded by: Himself
- Succeeded by: Muhammad Mohsin Khan Leghari
- Constituency: Constituency NA-174 (Rajanpur-I)
- In office 13 August 1990 – 31 December 1996
- Succeeded by: Himself
- Constituency: Constituency NA-174 (Rajanpur-I)

Personal details
- Born: 23 June 1945
- Died: 31 December 2022 (aged 77) Lahore, Punjab, Pakistan
- Party: Pakistan Tehreek-e-Insaf (2018−2022)
- Other political affiliations: Pakistan Muslim League (N) (2013-2018); Pakistan Peoples Party (2008-2013); Pakistan Muslim League (Q) (2004-2008); Millat Party (1999-2004); Pakistan Muslim League (N) (1997-1999); Pakistan Peoples Party (1988-1996); Pakistan Muslim League (1985-1988)

Muhammad Jaffar Khan Leghari (Urdu: سردار محمد جعفر خان لغاری; 23 June 1945 – 31 December 2022) was a Pakistani politician who was a member of the National Assembly of Pakistan, since August 2018 until his death in December 2022. Previously, he was a member of the National Assembly from October 2002 to 2007, from 2008 to 2013, and from June 2013 to May 2018.

== Political career ==
Leghari was elected to the Provincial Assembly of the Punjab as a candidate of Pakistan People's Party (PPP) from PP-204 Rajanpur-I in the 1988 Punjab provincial election. He received 30,531 votes and defeated Sardar Ghazali Rahim, a candidate of Islami Jamhoori Ittehad (IJI).

He ran for the Provincial Assembly as a candidate of Pakistan Democratic Alliance (PDA) from PP-201 Dera Ghazi Khan-III and PP-204 Rajanpur-I in the 1990 Punjab provincial election, but was unsuccessful from both constituencies. He received 18,222 and 28,638 votes and was defeated by Zulfiqar Ali Khosa and Nasrullah Khan Dareshak, both candidates of IJI, respectively.

He was re-elected to the Provincial Assembly as a candidate of PPP from PP-204 Rajanpur-I in the 1993 Punjab provincial election. He received 38,461 votes and defeated Sardar Javed Iqbal Khan, a candidate of Pakistan Muslim League (N) (PML-N).

He was elected to the National Assembly of Pakistan as an independent candidate from NA-133 Dera Ghazi Khan-II in the 1997 Pakistani general election. He received 69,532 votes and defeated Imtiaz Ahmad Khan Leghari, a candidate of PML-N.

He was re-elected to the National Assembly as a candidate of National Alliance (NA) from Constituency NA-174 (Rajanpur-I) in the 2002 Pakistani general election. He received 59,783 votes and defeated Gorish Sardar Gorchani, a candidate of PML-N. In the same election, he ran for the seat of the Provincial Assembly of the Punjab as a candidate of National Alliance from Constituency PP-243 (Dera Ghazi Khan-IV) and as an independent candidate from Constituency PP-246 (Dera Ghazi Khan-VII) but was unsuccessful. He received 19,557 votes from Constituency PP-243 (Dera Ghazi Khan-IV) and lost the seat to Sardar Muhammad Khan Laghari. He received 368 votes from Constituency PP-246 (Dera Ghazi Khan-VII) and lost the seat to Sardar Muhammad Yousuf Khan Leghari, a candidate of National Alliance.

Leghari was re-elected to the National Assembly as a candidate of Pakistan Muslim League (Q) (PML-Q) from Constituency NA-174 (Rajanpur-I) in the 2008 Pakistani general election. He received 50,440 votes and defeated Sardar Nasrullah Khan Dreshak. In the same election, he also ran for the seat of the Provincial Assembly of the Punjab as an independent candidate from Constituency PP-245 (Dera Ghazi Khan-VI) and Constituency PP-246 (Dera Ghazi Khan-VII) but was unsuccessful. He received 553 votes from Constituency PP-245 (Dera Ghazi Khan-VI) and lost the seat to Muhammad Mohsin Khan Leghari. He received 205 votes from Constituency PP-246 (Dera Ghazi Khan-VII) and lost the seat to Sardar Muhammad Yousaf Khan Leghari, a candidate of PML-Q.

Leghari was re-elected to the National Assembly as a candidate of PML-N from Constituency NA-174 (Rajanpur-I) in the 2013 Pakistani general election. He received 101,705 votes and defeated an independent candidate, Sardar Nasrullah Khan Dreshak.

In May 2018, he quit PML-N and joined Pakistan Tehreek-e-Insaf (PTI). He was re-elected to the National Assembly as a candidate of PTI from Constituency NA-193 (Rajanpur-I) in 2018 Pakistani general election. He died on 31 December 2022.

== Death ==
Leghari died in Lahore on 31 December 2022, at the age of 77. He was survived by his wife and a daughter.

== See also ==
- List of members of the 15th National Assembly of Pakistan
- Farooq Leghari
