= Harand, Pakistan =

Harrand is an old city in Pakistan located in Rajanpur district of Punjab. Its original name was Hari Nand, but now it is called Harrand. It is supposed that during the attack of Alexander this city was part of Iranian empire. After conquering this area Alexander reached this city and was married to the daughter of Darius. There is detail of this event in famous Persian book Sikander Nama, but most historians are skeptical of this story.

The city is the site of an old fort. Gorshani tribe is living here since long there was a battle between Baloch of Gorshani tribe and Sikh so Baloch people of Gorshani tribe spread all around in district Rajanpur.
