= Muhammad Mohsin Khan Leghari =

Pakistani politician

Member of the National Assembly of Pakistan
- In office 27 March 2023 – 10 August 2023
- Preceded by: Jaffar Khan Leghari
- Constituency: NA-193 (Rajanpur-I)

Provincial Minister of Finance, Punjab
- In office 7 August 2022 – 14 January 2023
- Appointed by: Chaudhry Pervaiz Elahi
- Preceded by: Awais Leghari

Provincial Minister of Irrigation, Punjab
- In office 27 August 2018 – April 2022
- Appointed by: Usman Buzdar
- Preceded by: Amanat Ullah Khan Shadikhel

Member of the Provincial Assembly of the Punjab
- In office 15 August 2018 – 14 January 2023
- Preceded by: Sardar Ali Raza Khan Dreshak
- Constituency: PP-293 (Rajanpur-I)
- In office January 2003 – March 2012
- Constituency: PP-245 (D.G.Khan-VI)

Member of the Senate of Pakistan
- In office March 2012 – March 2018

Personal details
- Born: 9 June 1963 (age 63) Dera Ghazi Khan, Punjab, Pakistan
- Party: PTI (2018-present)
- Other political affiliations: Independent (2012-2018); PML-Q (2004-2012); National Alliance (2002-2004); Millat Party (1997–2002)

Muhammad Mohsin Khan Leghari (Urdu: محمد محسن خان لغاری; born 9 June 1963) is a Pakistani politician who had been a member of the National Assembly of Pakistan from March 2023 till August 2023. He also served as Provincial Minister of Punjab for Irrigation from August 2018 till April 2022, and for Finance from August 2022 till January 2023. He had been a member of the 14th Provincial Assembly of Punjab (2003-2007) and the 15th Provincial Assembly of Punjab (2008-2012). He had been elected for the 3rd tenure to the Provincial Assembly of the Punjab and served from August 2018 till January 2023. He has also represented Punjab in the Senate of Pakistan from March 2012 to March 2018.

== Early life and education ==
He was born on 9 June 1963 in Dera Ghazi Khan to Lt. Col. (R.) Rafiq Ahmed Leghari.

After his early education from Aitchison College, he attended the University of Oklahoma. He got his Certification in Global Financial Markets from FINSIA and he also has a post-graduate diploma in Applied Economics from the University of the Punjab. He is an alumnus of the National Defence University, Pakistan and International Academy for Leadership (IAF) of Friedrich Naumann Foundation, in Gummersbach (Germany). He worked with representatives of multinational companies like Compaq and ComputerLand before working with the leading newswire Reuters providing technical and product support for Reuters Financial Market Data Terminals for over a decade before contesting the elections in January 2003.

== Political career ==
He was elected for the first time to the Provincial Assembly of the Punjab as a candidate of National Alliance from Constituency PP-245 (Dera Ghazi Khan-VI) in by-elections held in 2003. He was re-elected to the Provincial Assembly of the Punjab as a candidate of Pakistan Muslim League (Q) from Constituency PP-245 (Dera Ghazi Khan-VI) in the 2008 Pakistani general election.

In 2012, he resigned from his seat in the Punjab Assembly. after he was elected to the Senate of Pakistan as the only independent candidate in the 2012 Pakistani Senate election. His election as an Independent Candidate was unprecedented in Punjab Senate Elections. Not having an official nomination from any political party, he relied on his goodwill and reputation as a credible parliamentarian to secure a place in the Senate. His contributions were always well-researched, punctuated with facts and references to literature and parliamentary practices from across the world. The Senate membership term ended in March 2018.

He was re-elected to the Provincial Assembly of the Punjab for the third time as a candidate of Pakistan Tehreek-e-Insaf (PTI) from Constituency PP-293 (Rajanpur-I) in the 2018 Pakistani general election.

He has been an active advocate of the South Punjab cause since his early days in the Punjab Assembly and also in the Senate. He had been raising the issue in his earlier tenures and immediately after taking oath on 15 August 2018, he submitted a resolution in the Punjab Assembly demanding the initiation of the process for the creation of Southern Punjab as a separate province.

On 27 August 2018, he was inducted into the provincial Punjab cabinet of Chief Minister Sardar Usman Buzdar and was appointed Minister for Irrigation. He ceased to hold this office in April 2022 when Buzdar resigned.

On 7 August 2022, he was inducted into the provincial cabinet of Chief Minister Chaudhry Pervaiz Elahi and was appointed the Minister for Finance. He ceased to hold this office in January 2023 when the cabinet was dissolved.

He was elected to the National Assembly of Pakistan as a candidate of PTI from NA-193 (Rajanpur-I) in a 2023 by-election. He received 90,392 votes and defeated Ammar Ahmed Khan Leghari, a candidate of the Pakistan Muslim League (N) (PML(N)) and Akhtar Hassan Khan Gorchani, a candidate of the Pakistan People's Party (PPP). He took the oath of office on 27 March 2023.

He ran for a seat in the Provincial Assembly from PP-293 Rajanpur-I as a candidate of the PTI in the 2023 Punjab provincial election.

== Interest in water crisis ==
Mr. Leghari has been a strong advocate for the water issue and has been trying to raise awareness of the imminent water crisis Pakistan is facing. From his earlier days in the Provincial Assembly of Punjab or in the Senate of Pakistan, he has been a strong voice on water issues. He has represented Pakistan at the World Water Forum and the 2016 United Nations Climate Change Conference. He has been instrumental in raising awareness about unfettered groundwater exploitation and has contributed to the promulgation of Punjab's first-ever Water Act as a milestone in addressing a fundamental issue that had been ignored since decades. Soon after taking office as Minister for Irrigation, Leghari launched a major campaign to root out the persistent problem of water theft in the province. The campaign was widely hailed successful as a large number of water theft cases were reported to the police and canals located at the tail-end of the irrigation system in the south-Punjab started receiving irrigation supplies after several years.
