= Tahir Khan Nahar =

16th-century ruler

Tahir Khan Nahar (Urdu: طاہر خان ناہڑ), also known as ‘Sakhi’ (generous or liberal), was an independent chief of Sitpur in Punjab in 15th century CE. In 1455, Bahlul Lodi gave a large treaty to his relative Islam Khan Lodhi, who adopted the title of Nahar. Tahir Khan Nahar was the grandson of Islam Khan Nahar. Tahir Khan Nahar is well-known for his tomb and mosque, which he constructed in his lifetime in around 1530. This site is included in cultural heritage sites in Muzaffargarh and protected by the Federal Government of Pakistan.

== See also ==
- Tomb of Tahir Khan Nahar
- Shahi Mosque, Seetpur
