= Constituency PP-245 (Dera Ghazi Khan-VI) =

Constituency of the Punjabi provincial legislature, Pakistan

PP-245 (Dera Ghazi Khan-VI)
- Provincial constituency for the Provincial Assembly of Punjab

Current constituency

Constituency PP-245 (Dera Ghazi Khan-VI) is a Constituency of Provincial Assembly of Punjab.

== See also ==
- Punjab, Pakistan
