= Wasiq Qayyum Abbasi =

Pakistani politician

Deputy Speaker of the Provincial Assembly of Punjab
- In office 31 July 2022 – 14 January 2023
- Speaker: Sibtain Khan
- Preceded by: Dost Muhammad Mazari
- Succeeded by: Zaheer Iqbal Channar

Member of the Provincial Assembly of Punjab
- In office 15 August 2018 – 14 January 2023
- Constituency: PP-12 (Rawalpindi-VII)

Personal details
- Born: 24 June 1987 (age 39) Rawalpindi, Punjab, Pakistan
- Citizenship: Pakistan
- Other political affiliations: PTI (2018–2023)

Wasiq Qayyum Abbasi (born 24 June 1987) is a Pakistani politician who served as the Deputy Speaker of the Provincial Assembly of Punjab from July 2022 till January 2023, being the youngest person to have held this role. He had been a member of the Provincial Assembly of the Punjab from August 2018 till January 2023.

== Political career ==
He was elected to the Provincial Assembly of the Punjab as a candidate of the Pakistan Tehreek-e-Insaf (PTI) from PP-12 (Rawalpindi-VII) in the 2018 Punjab provincial election.

He was elected unopposed as the Deputy Speaker of the Provincial Assembly on 30 July 2022, and was notified the day after. His election came after a successful vote of no confidence against his predecessor Dost Muhammad Mazari due to circumstances arising during the 2022 Pakistani constitutional crisis.

He ran for a seat in the Provincial Assembly from PP-12 Rawalpindi-VII as a candidate of the PTI in the 2023 Punjab provincial election.
