= Sardar Ali Raza Khan Dreshak =

Pakistani politician

Member of the Provincial Assembly of the Punjab
- In office 2 September 2013 – 31 May 2018
- Succeeded by: Muhammad Mohsin Khan Leghari
- Constituency: PP-247 (Rajanpur-I)

Personal details
- Born: 9 October 1977 (age 48) Lahore, Punjab, Pakistan
- Party: PTI (2013-present)
- Parent: Sardar Nasrullah Khan Dreshak (father)

Sardar Ali Raza Khan Dreshak is a Pakistani politician who was a Member of the Provincial Assembly of the Punjab, from September 2013 to May 2018.

== Early life and education ==
He was born on 9 October 1977 in Lahore to Sardar Nasrullah Khan Dreshak.

He has a degree of Bachelor of Science where he obtained in 1998 from Government College, Lahore, a degree of Bachelor of Laws (Hons) where he received in 2000 from University of London. He did Bar-at-Law from the Lincoln's Inn in 2004.

== Political career ==
He was elected to the Provincial Assembly of the Punjab as a candidate of Pakistan Tehreek-e-Insaf from Constituency PP-247 (Rajanpur-I) in the 2013 Pakistani general election.

In September 2018, a deputy commissioner from Rajanpur accused Dreshak and his father of illegally interfering in transfers and postings of members of Revenue Department and officials of the Border Military Police.
