= Sitpur =

Town in Punjab, Pakistan

Seetpur سیت پور
- Union council
- The Shahi Mosque of Seetpur, with the tomb of Tahir Khan in background

- Location Seetpur (Pakistan)
- Coordinates: 29.24067°N 70.84128°E
- Country: Pakistan
- Province: Punjab
- District: Muzaffargarh
- Tehsil: Alipur
- Time zone: UTC+5 (PST)
  - Summer (DST): UTC+6 (PDT)
- Area code: 34480

Seetpur or Sitpur is a city and union council in Tehsil Alipur of Muzaffargarh District in south Punjab, Pakistan. Agriculture is the mainstay of the regional economy.

The Government High School of Seetpur was established by the British during the British Raj. Main tourist attractions in Seetpur include the 16th century mausoleum of Tahir Khan and the Shahi Mosque. Its architecture resembles that of the Multan tombs, but it is smaller in size compared to them.

== History ==
Sītpūr was listed in the Ain-i-Akbari as a pargana in sarkar Multan, counted as part of the Bīrūn-i Panjnad ("Beyond the Five Rivers"). It was assessed at 4,608,000 dams in revenue and supplied a force of 20 cavalry and 100 infantry. Sitpur was strongly associated with the Nahars in Mughal times — the Dasturul 'Amal-i Shahjahani referred to Sitpur as "territory of the Nāhars", and the Mazhar-i Shahjahani referred to it as "Sītpūr Nāharān".
