= Ahmad Ali Khan Dreshak =

Pakistani politician (born 1979)

Member of the Provincial Assembly of the Punjab
- In office 15 August 2018 – 14 January 2023
- Constituency: PP-290 (Dera Ghazi Khan-VI)
- In office 2 September 2013 – 31 May 2018
- Constituency: PP-243 (Dera Ghazi Khan-IV)

Personal details
- Born: 1 January 1979 (age 47)
- Party: PTI (2013-present)
- Relations: Sardar Nasrullah Khan Dreshak (grandfather)

Ahmad Ali Khan Dreshak is a Pakistani politician who remained a Member of the Provincial Assembly of the Punjab from September 2013 to May 2018, and from August 2018 to January 2023.

== Early life ==
He was born on 1 January 1979.

== Political career ==
He was elected to the Provincial Assembly of the Punjab as a candidate of the Pakistan Tehreek-e-Insaf (PTI) from PP-243 (Dera Ghazi Khan-IV) in by-elections held in August 2013.

He was re-elected to Provincial Assembly of Punjab as a candidate of the PTI from PP-290 (Dera Ghazi Khan-VI) in the 2018 Punjab provincial election.

He ran for a seat in the Provincial Assembly from PP-290 Dera Ghazi Khan-VI as a candidate of the PTI in the 2023 Punjab provincial election.
