= Sardar Riaz Mehmood Khan Mazari =

Pakistani politician

Member of the National Assembly of Pakistan
- In office 13 August 2018 – 10 August 2023
- Constituency: NA-195 (Rajanpur-III)

Personal details
- Party: AP (2026-present)
- Other political affiliations: PMLN (2024-2026); PTI (2018-2023)
- Children: Sher Dil Mazari (son); Sher Alam Mazari (son)
- Parent: Balakh Sher Mazari (father)

Sardar Riaz Mehmood Khan Mazari (Urdu: سردار ریاض محمود خان مزاری) is a Pakistani politician who had been a member of the National Assembly of Pakistan from August 2018 till August 2023.

== Political career ==
He was elected to the National Assembly of Pakistan from Constituency NA-195 (Rajanpur-III) as a candidate of Pakistan Tehreek-e-Insaf in the 2018 Pakistani general election.

He contested the 2024 general elections for the National Assembly of Pakistan from NA-189 on a PML-N ticket.
