= Rajanpur Tehsil =

Rajanpur Tehsil تحصِيل راجن پُور
- Tehsil
- Country: Pakistan
- Region: (Punjab, Pakistan) Punjab
- Division: Dera Ghazi Khan
- District: Rajanpur
- Established: 1 July 1982; 44 years ago

Government
  - Type: Town Municipal Committee
  - Deputy Commissioner: Imran hussain Ranjha (PAS)
  - Constituensy: NA-188 Rajanpur-II
  - National Assembly Member: Hafeez-ur-Rehman Dreshak

Area
  - Tehsil: 2,078 km^{2} (802 sq mi)
- Elevation: 97 m (318 ft)

Population (2023)
  - Tehsil: 853,192
  - Density: 410.6/km^{2} (1,063/sq mi)
  - Urban: 310,659 (36.41%)
  - Rural: 542,533 (64.59%)

Literacy (2023)
  - Literacy rate: Total: (41.38%); Male: (49.09%); Female: (33.40%)
- Time zone: UTC+05:00 (PKT)
  - Summer (DST): DST is not observed
- ZIP Code: 33500
- NWD (area) code: 604
- ISO 3166 code: PK-PB

Rajanpur (Urdu: تحصِيل راجن پُور), is a tehsil located in Rajanpur District, Punjab, Pakistan. It is administratively subdivided into 16 Union Councils, two of which form the tehsil capital Rajanpur.

== Demographics ==
=== Population ===
Historical population
Year	Pop.	±% p.a.
1951	85,071	—
1961	104,533	+2.08%
1972	156,405	+3.73%
1981	214,517	+3.57%
1998	395,953	+3.67%
2017	706,770	+3.10%
2023	853,192	+3.19%

As of the 2023 census, Rajanpur tehsil has population of 853,192. Out of which, Urban population is 310,659 which is nearly 36.41% and rural population is 542,533.

As of the 2023 census, Rajanpur Tehsil has a total literacy rate of 41.38%, with male literacy at 49.09% and female literacy at 33.40%.
