= Jampur =

- City
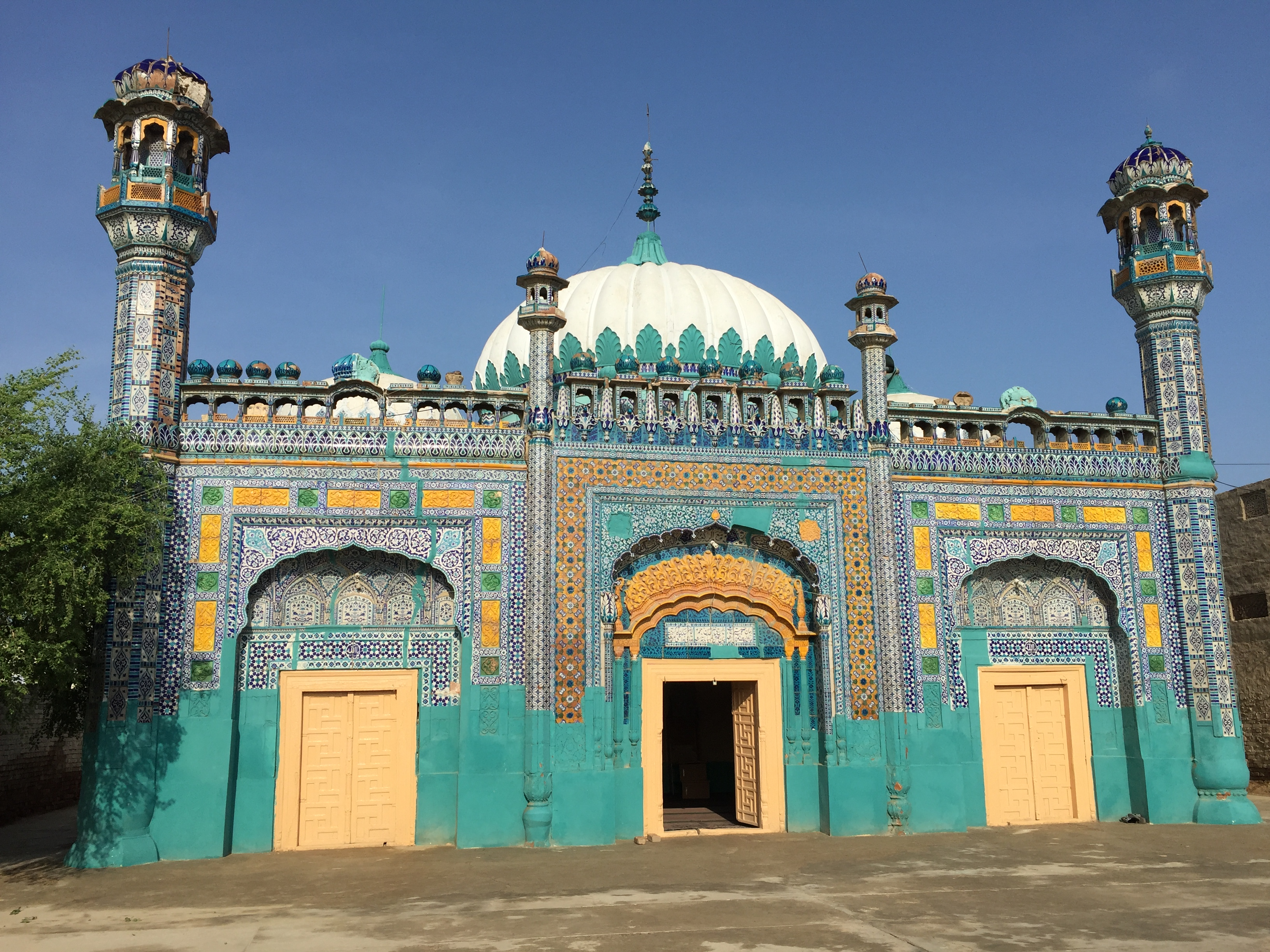
- Deen Muhammad Khan Mosque

- Location within Punjab, Pakistan Location within Pakistan
- Coordinates: 29.38°N 70.35°E
- Country: Pakistan
- Province: (Punjab, Pakistan) Punjab
- Division: Dera Ghazi Khan
- District: Rajanpur

Government
  - Type: Municipal Committee
  - Administrator: Sohail Riaz
  - Chief Officer: Vacant
- Elevation: 103 m (338 ft)

Population (2023)
  - City: 155,243
  - Rank: 73rd in Pakistan
- Time zone: UTC+5 (PST)
- Calling code: 0604
- Union councils: 19

Jampur (جام پور) is the capital city of Jampur Tehsil, in the Rajanpur District of Punjab, Pakistan. It comprises an area of about 16.7 square kilometers and has a population of about 155,243 (2023) It is the capital of Jampur Tehsil. Approximately 50 km to the west are the high and dry, barren mountains of the Sulaiman Range. To the east is the Indus river.

== Etymology ==
The old name of Jampur was Jadam Pur.The word Jampur has two parts: "JAM" and "PUR". "Jadam"(was Jakhar by Caste) faded into "Jam" with the passage of time. "Pur" means "vivified by" or "populated by".

== Demographics ==
Population

Historical population
| Year | Pop. | ±% p.a. |
|---|---|---|
| 1951 | 13,235 | — |
| 1961 | 13,161 | −0.06% |
| 1972 | 19,944 | +3.85% |
| 1981 | 27,949 | +3.82% |
| 1998 | 52,516 | +3.78% |
| 2017 | 87,857 | +2.75% |
| 2023 | 155,243 | +9.95% |

According to 2023 census, Jampur had a population of 155,243.

Languages

Languages of Jampur MC (2023 Census)
1. Saraiki (83.0%)
2. Urdu (14.1%)
3. Mewati (0.90%)
4. Balochi (0.90%)
5. Others (1.10%)

Saraiki and Urdu are the most spoken languages in the city.

== Educational institutes ==
Jampur is a lightly populated city with a lack of industry, though the land is fertile. One of the main local educational institutes is Govt. Boys High School Jampur which was founded in 1885, as a consequence of the introduction of the British Government system in 1857. Jampur has two public girls high schools for education up to the 10th class. The city has one public college for boys and one for girls.

== Medical facilities ==
Jampur has a Tehsil Headquarter Hospital (T.H.Q) which consists of 1000 beds and many private clinics where specialized doctors serve.

== Civil administration ==
Tehsil Jampur has 19 Union Councils namely: union council Nawan Baig Raj (Hafiz Farooq Akbar Pitafi home), Allahabad, Basti Rindan, Bokhara, Burrerywala, Dajal, Hajipur, Harrand, Jampur East, Jampur Gharbi, Kot Tahir, Kotla Dewan, Kotla Mughlan, Muhammad Pur, Noorpur Manjuwala, Noshahera, Tal Shumali, Tatarwala, Tibbi Lundan, Wah Leshari

The city has been modernized due to education and access to technology, like the internet. Most of the city is now inhabited by Urdu speaking Muhajir families which moved here post-partition of 1947.

== See also ==
- Punjab (Pakistan)
- Pakistan
- Dera Ghazi Khan
- Kotla Mughlan
- Dajal, Rajanpur
