= Rojhan Tehsil =

Rojhan Tehsil تحصيل روجهان تحصیل روجھاݨ مزاری
- Tehsil
- Country: Pakistan
- Region: (Punjab, Pakistan) Punjab
- Division: Dera Ghazi Khan
- District: Rajanpur

Area
  - Tehsil: 2,905 km^{2} (1,122 sq mi)

Population (2023)
  - Tehsil: 419,011
  - Density: 144.2/km^{2} (373.6/sq mi)
  - Urban: 15,871 (3.35%)
  - Rural: 403,140 (96.65%)

Literacy (2023)
  - Literacy rate: Total: (20.98%); Male: (28.18%); Female: (13.04%)
- Time zone: UTC+5 (PST)
  - Summer (DST): UTC+6 (PDT)

Rojhan (Urdu: تحصِيل روجهان) is a tehsil located in the Rajanpur District, Punjab, Pakistan. It is administratively subdivided into 8 Union Councils The headquarters of the tehsil is located in the town of Rojhan at the footholds of the Suleiman Range and on the western bank of Indus River. It is situated in the tri border area of Punjab, Pakistan. Rojhan tehsil borders Balochistan to its south west, Sindh to its south and Rahim Yar Khan District to its west.Rojhan tehsil in the stronghold of Mazari tribe.

== Demographics ==
=== Population ===
Historical population
Year	Pop.	±% p.a.
1951	46,500	—
1961	63,188	+3.11%
1972	93,801	+3.66%
1981	126,654	+3.39%
1998	208,563	+2.98%
2017	405,689	+3.56%
2023	474,077	+2.63%

As of the 2023 census, Rojhan tehsil has population of 474,077. Out of which, Urban population is 15,871 which is nearly 3.35% and rural population is 403,140.

=== Literacy ===
As of the 2023 census, Rojhan Tehsil has a total literacy rate of 20.98%, with male literacy at 28.18% and female literacy at 13.04%.

=== Languages ===
The largest languages in the tehsil are Balochi (53.37%) and Saraiki (44.97%) as of 2023.
