= Rajanpur =

Rajanpur راجن پور
- City
- Rajanpur
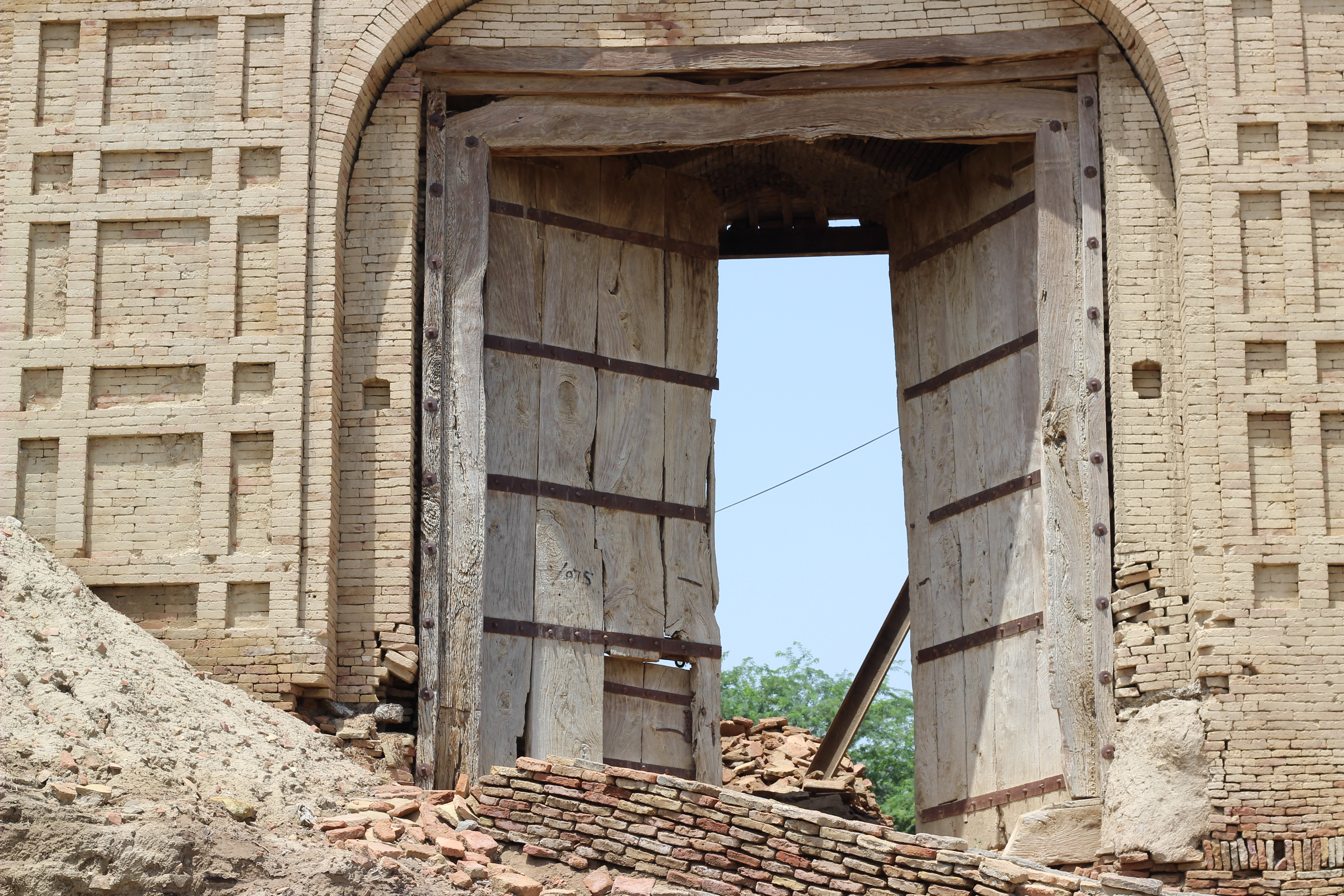
- Gateway of Rajanpur's Harand Fort

- Location within Punjab, Pakistan Location within Pakistan
- Coordinates: 29°6′15″N 70°19′29″E
- Country: Pakistan
- Province: Punjab
- Division: Dera Ghazi Khan
- District: Rajanpur
- Established: 1732; 294 years ago

Government
  - Type: Municipal Committee
  - Chairman: Kunawar Kamal Akhtar
  - Vice Chairman: Ch. Naeem Saqib Advocate
  - Chief Officer: Syed Masood-ur-Rauf Ahmad Rizvi Qazi
  - Municipal Officer (Finance): Muhammad Akram Bari
  - Computer Section: Abdullah Hussain Dreshak

Population (2023)
  - City: 137,553
  - Rank: 86th in Pakistan
- Time zone: UTC+5 (PST)
  - Summer (DST): +6
- Postal code: 33500
- Dialling code: 604
- Acronym: RJP
- Demonym: Rajanpuri
- Highways: N-55
- HDI (2024): 0.557 (medium)
- Website: http://www.mcrajanpur.lgpunjab.org.pk/

Rajanpur (Note: Urdu: راجن پُور) is a city and the headquarters of Rajanpur District in the far southwestern part of Punjab, Pakistan. The district lies entirely west of the Indus River.

== History ==
Rajanpur was founded by Sheikh Rajan Shah, the makhdum of Sitpur, in about 1732. He had captured his estates from the previously ruling Nahar tribesmen (see Tahir Khan Nahar). The settlement remained a largely unimportant village until flooding in 1862 severely damaged the nearby district headquarters at Mithankot – leading to the transfer of government offices to Rajanpur. A small dispensary clinic was established in Rajanpur that same year. Rajanpur was then constituted as a municipality in 1873.

== Demographics ==
Population

Historical population
Year	Pop.	±% p.a.
1951	5,280	—
1961	6,575	+2.22%
1972	10,011	+3.90%
1981	18,789	+7.25%
1998	43,643	+5.08%
2017	99,097	+4.41%
2023	137,553	+5.62%

According to 2023 census, Rajanpur had a population of 137,553.

Languages

Languages of Rajanpur MC (2023 Census)
1. Saraiki (75.6%)
2. Punjabi (11.8%)
3. Urdu (9.30%)
4. Balochi (2.40%)
5. Others (0.90%)
