= Jampur Tehsil =

Tehsil in Punjab, Pakistan

Jampur Tehsil تحصیل جام پور تحصیل ڄام پور
- Tehsil
- Country: Pakistan
- Region: (Punjab, Pakistan) Punjab
- Division: Dera Ghazi Khan
- District: Jampur

Area
  - Tehsil: 2,322 km^{2} (897 sq mi)

Population (2023)
  - Tehsil: 1,012,039
  - Density: 435.8/km^{2} (1,129/sq mi)
  - Urban: 304,693 (30.11%)
  - Rural: 707,346 (69.89%)

Literacy (2023)
  - Literacy rate: 38.07%
- Time zone: UTC+5 (PST)
  - Summer (DST): UTC+6 (PDT)

Jampur (Urdu: تحصِيل جام پُور), is a tehsil located in Punjab, Pakistan. It is capital of Jampur district. It is administratively subdivided into 19 Union Councils, two of which form the tehsil capital Jampur.

== Demographics ==
=== Population ===
Historical population
Year	Pop.	±% p.a.
1951	111,955	—
1961	129,331	+1.45%
1972	200,786	+4.08%
1981	276,258	+3.61%
1998	485,051	+3.37%
2017	849,389	+2.99%
2023	1,012,039	+2.96%

As of the 2023 census, Jampur Tehsil has population of 1,012,039.
