= Rajanpur District =

Coordinates: 29.104650°N 70.325665°E

Rajanpur District ضِلع راجن پُور
- District of Punjab
- Rajanpur District highlighted within Punjab Province
- Country: Pakistan
- Province: (Punjab, Pakistan) Punjab
- Division: Dera Ghazi Khan
- Established: 1 July 1982; 44 years ago
- Headquarters: Rajanpur
- Tehsils: 04: De-Excluded Area Jampur Rajanpur Rojhan

Government
  - Type: District Administration
  - Deputy Commissioner: Imran Hussain Ranjha
  - Constituensy: NA-187 Rajanpur-I; NA-188 Rajanpur-II; NA-189 Rajanpur-III

Area
  - District of Punjab: 12,318 km^{2} (4,756 sq mi)
- Elevation: 97 m (318 ft)
- Highest elevation: 1,463 m (4,800 ft)
- Lowest elevation: 90 m (300 ft)

Population (2023)
  - District of Punjab: 2,323,980
  - Density: 188.67/km^{2} (488.64/sq mi)
  - Urban: 631,223 (26.51%)
  - Rural: 1,749,826 (73.49%)

Literacy (2023)
  - Literacy rate: Total: (36.09%); Male: (43.68%); Female: (28.18%)
- Time zone: UTC+05:00 (PKT)
  - Summer (DST): DST is not observed
- ZIP Code: 33500
- NWD (area) code: 604
- ISO 3166 code: PK-PB

Rajanpur (Urdu: ضِلع راجن پُور) is a district of Dera Ghazi Khan Division in the Punjab province of Pakistan, with its administrative headquarters the city of Rajanpur. District of Rajanpur was formerly part of Dera Ghazi Khan District and was created on 1 July 1982. According to the 2023 Pakistani census, the district had a population of 2,323,980 (2.3 million).

== Administrative subdivisions ==
The district of Rajanpur comprises the following administrative subdivisions (Tehsil) and 44 Union Councils.

Tehsil	Area (km²)	Pop. (2023)	Density (ppl/km²) (2023)	Literacy rate (2023)	Union Councils
Rojhan	2,905	474,077	163.19	20.98%	9
Rajanpur	2,078	853,192	410.58	41.38%	16
De-Excluded Area Rajanpur	5,013	41,741	113.13	8.60%	...
Jampur Tehsil	2,322	1,011,499	435.85	38.07%	...

== Etymology and geography ==
The anatomy of Rajanpur district is associated with its town Rajanpur, which was founded by Makhdoom Sheikh Rajan Shah in 1770. It was merged with Dera Ghazi Khan district in 1982. Rajanpur is situated in the west side of River Indus. Its north side is bounded by Dera Ghazi Khan district, and west by Dera Bugti district of Balochistan. The east side is bounded by Muzaffargarh and Rahim Yar Khan districts, while its south part is covered by Kashmore district of Sindh province. The Sulaiman Mountains rise to the west of the district.

== Demographics ==
Historical population
Year	Pop.	±% p.a.
1951	247,136	—
1961	304,020	+2.09%
1972	456,391	+3.76%
1981	638,921	+3.81%
1998	1,103,618	+3.27%
2017	1,996,039	+3.17%
2023	2,381,049	+2.98%

As of the 2023 census, Rajanpur district has 354,016 households and a population of 2,381,049. The district has a sex ratio of 103.19 males to 100 females and a literacy rate of 36.09%: 43.68% for males and 28.18% for females. 816,895 (35.15% of the surveyed population) are under 10 years of age. 631,223 (26.51%) live in urban areas.

Religion in contemporary Rajanpur District
Religious group	1941		2017		2023	
Religious group	Pop.	%	Pop.	%	Pop.	%
Islam	227,182	89.97%	1,993,874	99.89%	2,317,597	99.73%
Hinduism (Note: 1941 census: Including Ad-Dharmis)	24,496	9.70%	1,442	0.07%	1,030	0.04%
Sikhism	817	0.32%	—N/a	—N/a	25	~0%
Christianity	3	0.01%	111	~0%	4,841	0.21%
Ahmadi	—N/a	—N/a	493	0.02%	339	0.01%
Others (Note: Including Jainism, Buddhism, Zoroastrianism, Judaism, or not stated)	0	0%	119	0.01%	148	0.01%
Total Population	252,498	100%	1,996,039	100%	2,323,980	100%
Note: 1941 census data is for Rajanpur, Jampur and part of De-Excluded Area (then-named Biloch Trans-Frontier Tract) tehsils of erstwhile Dera Ghazi Khan District, which roughly corresponds to contemporary Rajanpur district. Population corresponding to de-excluded area was computed based on population of area remaining in the district after the formation of Rajanpur district, with ratios of religions assumed to be the same. District and tehsil borders have changed since 1941.

Languages of Rajanpur district (2023)
1. Saraiki (76.7%)
2. Balochi (17.8%)
3. Urdu (2.61%)
4. Punjabi (2.28%)
5. Others (0.67%)

At the time of the 2023 census, 76.67% of the population spoke Saraiki, 17.77% Balochi, 2.61% Urdu and 2.28% Punjabi as their first language.

The major tribes in this district are Jat, Arain, Rajput and Baloch.

== Education ==
Rajanpur has a total of 1,160 government schools out of which 41% (479 schools) are for female students. The district's public schools have 148,746 enrollments.

== Agriculture ==
Agriculture in Rajanpur depends solely upon canal irrigation since rainfall is negligible in the region. The five rivers of Punjab meet at the locality of Wang near Mithankot; hence these rivers provide water for irrigation as well as for domestic usage. Rainfall occurs during the monsoon season (July–September). Occasional heavy rainfall causes flooding in this region, but such floods are rare. In Rajanpur, floodwaters come from the Koh Sultan and Shacher torrents (rivulets), as well as the Indus.

Rajanpur district is famous for cotton and sugarcane crops, although they are cultivating wheat and rice as well and tobacco to a minimal extent too.

== Business ==
Rajanpur is also famous for its cotton business. There are many cotton industries in this district that play an essential role in fulfilling the needs of cotton for textile mills. However, some of the people also do agricultural work, which is a leading business of Rajanpur.

== Irrigation system ==
=== Canal irrigation ===
The agriculture of Rajanpur depends upon canal irrigation in some areas of Rajanpur peoples drinking canal water in these areas Pachad include:

=== Rod-Kohi (Hill Torrents) ===
Major Rod-Kohi areas traversed by hill torrents constitute nearly 65 percent of the total area of Pakistan and encompass entire Balochistan, i.e. (Makran coastal Basin and Kharan closed Desert Basin). The other major hill torrent areas include D.G.Khan and D.I.Khan, FATA, and Azad Jammu and Kashmir. In Sindh province, the systems are spread in the Dadu district (Kirthar range). There are around 17,130,000 acres (69,300 km^{2}) as the potential area underhill torrent / Rod-Kohi / Sailaba fanning excluding riverine areas. Indigenous Spate Irrigation/ hill torrent-irrigation systems traditionally called Rod-Kohi. Rod means water channel, and Kohi pertains to mountains. In these areas, the major constraint is the use of flood flow, which is highly variable in quantity and distribution, both in time and space. Annual rainfall is low, uncertain, and patchy. Flow is laden with high silt in each flood. In spite of the scarcity of water, the major part of flood flows is lost due to mismanagement. Spate irrigation often takes place in environments that are arid and remote. Poverty in these areas is a significant issue. There are very few options for generating income and improvement of livelihood. Abject poverty in the areas affected by the Rod-Kohi water calls for rational and scientific management of flood flows.

Rod-Kohi or hill torrent cultivation is a unique system of agriculture being practiced in all the four provinces. In NWFP, D.I.Khan tract represents the major part of the system fed by five large tributaries locally named as "Zams." In Punjab, a significant portion of the system falls in the districts of D.G.Khan, Rajanpur, and Jampur. In Balochistan, this system falls in the areas of Barkhan, Musakhail, Loralai, Zhob, Bolan, and Lasbella. In Sindh province, the system is spread in Dadu & Larkana district (Kirthar range). The largest area under the regime of agriculture lies in Balochistan.

Spate Irrigation is a traditionally used system for diverting hill torrents into cultivable command areas for growing seasonal crops. Extreme events of floods and droughts characterize the farming system. It usually entails the construction of an earthen diversion weir across the torrent with an extensive channel on one or both sides of the river to convey floodwater across vast distances. These earthen diversion structures and water conveyance system has traditionally been constructed by the beneficiaries/communities themselves, making use of traditional technology. Farmers construct field by making embankments from 3 to 6 feet (1.8 m) high to store the water depending upon the soil type, share in water, and various other factors. Upon drying, crops are sown, which thrive on the moisture stored in the soil. There is no further irrigation except rains if any occurs. The economic significance of Rod-Kohi Irrigation agriculture is centered on subsistence agriculture and livestock raising, which are the primary sources of income. Another aspect of the Spate Irrigation System of Rod-Kohi areas is the occurrence of the perennial water (known as Kalapani), which is available throughout the year in the upper reaches. It contributes significantly to sustainable farming in the area and used for high-value crops like fodder, fruits, and vegetables. The development potential in Rod-Kohi Hill torrent areas is listed below.

== Floods ==
In July 2015, due to the heavy rains caused floods in the town. Rajanpur district was badly affected by these flash floods. In Rajanpur, flood water came from Koh Sultan and Shacher torrent (rivulet). This floodwater hit the different union councils of Rajanpur. Hundreds of houses were damaged fully and partially, and inhabitants had to spend time under the open sky. The displaced people have sought shelter in streets and other public buildings and around their chaks (villages).

Table of affected union councils (UCs) with current population and damage caused by the 2015 flood.

No.	Population	District/ Tehsil/ U/C	Damage
01	34886	Rajanpur, Jahanpur	Fully
02	34886	Fatih Pur	Partially
03	22745	Jam Pur Hajji Pur	Partially
04	30978	Rojhan Umer Kot	Fully
05	20478	Daajil Tal Shuamili	Partially
06	19456	Dajil Buriri wala	Partially
07	21568	Daajil Noshira Gherbi	Partially
08	23789	Daajil Noor Pur	Partially

=== Analysis ===
In assessment and initial findings from the flood-affected district Rajan Pur show that 04 union councils were destroyed U/C Jahan Pur, U/C Fatih Pur, U/C Hajji Pur, and Umer Kot U/C. There was an urgent need for non-food items (NFIs), including mattresses, mosquito nets, kitchen utensils, fuel for daily cooking, and hygiene kits. Yearly food stock was almost washed away, while livestock suffered considerable loss. Affected people faced critical conditions and had suffered economically for at least one whole year as their crops were damaged on a large scale. According to the effects, flood was more massive than the one, some 40 years ago.

== Places ==
Mithankot is the shrine of the great Sufi Saraiki poet Khawaja Ghulam Farid. It is the historical place in Kot Mithan. Thousands of his disciples come to Rajanpur every year on the anniversary of Khawaja Ghulam Farid.

Fazilpur is the shrine of great Peer/Sufi Chan Charagh Shah Sain, a.k.a. Ghorrey Shah Sain. It is the historical place in Fazilpur. Fazilpur is situated in the center (heart) of Rajanpur district. And its importance in district Rajanpur is like a heart in every field, especially politics. Major caste living in Fazilpur are Bhutta, Gopang, Bosan, Mastoi, Mohajir (Yusafzai, Sherwani, Lodhi, Qureshi), Mashori, Dreshak, Korai, Thaheem, Bhatti, Zargar(Sunara) and Mughal Pathan.

Harrand Fort, built in the British era, is situated in the tribal area of Rajanpur.

Basti-Abdullah, named after Maulana Muhammad Abdullah and is also noted for being the resting place of Abdul Rashid Ghazi.

Lalgarh is situated in the foot-hills of Suleman Range mountains. It is HQ of Gorchani tribe. It is a small village, having a population of about 3000 inhabitants. Government offices include a police station, a higher secondary school, a girl's middle school, a civil dispensary, a veterinary dispensary, a telephone exchange & NADRA office.

Maari is the resort hill station in Rajanpur, similar to Muree. Its altitude is 4800 ft. It has freezing weather in summer. Dragal mountain is an altitude of 5,400 ft (1,600 m).

Ada Chiragh Shah is situated on the Indus Highway. There is a shrine of Baba Chiragh Shah, a Sufi peer.

Muhammad Pur Emergency Service Rescue 1122 is fully operational in Muhammad Pur district of Punjab.
