= Khushpur =

- Location within Pakistan
- Coordinates: 31.07°N 72.53°E
- Country: Pakistan
- Province: Punjab
- District: Faisalabad
- Tehsil: Samundri Tehsil
- Time zone: UTC+5 (PST)

Khushpur (Urdu: خوش پور) is a village in Samundri Tehsil of Faisalabad District in Punjab, Pakistan. It is located at 31°7'0N 72°53'0E at an altitude of 167 metres (551 feet). Neighbouring settlements include Nara Dada and Rashiana. There is a large Christian community in Khushpur.

== History ==
In 1905 the newly appointed Bishop of Lahore, Fabien Antoine Eestermans, made a visit to Khushpur village where he seemed to be happy about development there.

== Etymology ==
The name of the village, Khushpur, means "happy village", the word Khush means happy while pur refers to settlement (in this case a village), the villagers who first settled this area named the village after father Felix of Antwerp who had persuaded them to settle in the area despite initial hardship, Felix in Latin meaning happy.

== Demography ==
According to the 2017 census, the total population Khushpur was 4667 of whom, 2403 were male and 2264 female, also unlike Pakistan as a whole - Muslims in Khushpur were a minority of the village's population.

== See also ==
- Shrine of Baba Gurbaksh Das
