= Farkhanda Amjad =

Pakistani politician

Late Farkhanda Amjad

Member of the National Assembly of Pakistan
- In office 2008–2013
- Constituency: NA-92 (Toba Tek Singh-I)

Farkhanda Amjad Ali Warraich was a Pakistani politician who had been a member of the National Assembly of Pakistan from 2008 to 2013.

== Political career ==
She ran for the seat of the National Assembly of Pakistan as an independent candidate from Constituency NA-92 (Toba Tek Singh-I) in the 2002 Pakistani general election but was unsuccessful. She received 205 votes and lost the seat to Amjad Ali Warraich, a candidate of Pakistan Muslim League (J). In the same election, she ran for the seat of the Provincial Assembly of the Punjab from Constituency PP-84 (Toba Tek Singh-I) as an independent candidate but was unsuccessful. She received 83 votes and lost the seat to Bilal Asghar Warraich.

She was elected to the National Assembly from Constituency NA-92 (Toba Tek Singh-I) as a candidate of Pakistan Muslim League (Q) (PML-Q) in the 2008 Pakistani general election. She received 69,827 votes and defeated Hamza, a candidate of Pakistan Muslim League (N) (PML-N).

She ran for the seat of the National Assembly from Constituency NA-79 (Faisalabad-V) as a candidate of Pakistan National Muslim League (PNML) in the 2013 Pakistani general election but was unsuccessful. She received 11,549 votes and lost the seat to Chaudhry Shehbaz Babar. In the same election, she ran for the seat of the Provincial Assembly of the Punjab from Constituency PP-59 (Faisalabad-IX) as a candidate of PNML but was unsuccessful. She received 3,230 votes and lost the seat to Arif Mahmood Gill.
