= Rana Muhammad Farooq Saeed Khan =

Pakistani politician (born 1950)

Member of the National Assembly of Pakistan
- In office 2008–2013
- Constituency: NA-79 (Faisalabad-V)

Personal details
- Born: 26 July 1950 (age 75) Faisalabad, Punjab, Pakistan

Rana Muhammad Farooq Saeed Khan (born 26 July 1950) is a Pakistani politician who had been a member of the National Assembly of Pakistan from 2008 to 2013. He had been a member of the Provincial Assembly of the Punjab from 1993 to 1996.

== Political career ==
He ran for the seat of the Provincial Assembly of the Punjab as a candidate of Pakistan Peoples Party (PPP) from Constituency PP-49 (Faisalabad-VII) in the 1988 but was unsuccessful. He received 2,263 votes and lost the seat to an independent candidate, Mazhar Ali Gill.

He ran for the seat of the Provincial Assembly of the Punjab as a candidate of Pakistan Democratic Alliance (PDA) from Constituency PP-49 (Faisalabad-VII) in the 1990 Pakistani general election but was unsuccessful. He received 17,560 votes and lost the seat to Mazhar Ali Gill, a candidate of Islami Jamhoori Ittehad (IJI).

He was elected to the Provincial Assembly of the Punjab as a candidate of PPP from Constituency PP-49 (Faisalabad-VII) in the 1993 Pakistani general election. He received 31,162 votes and defeated Mazhar Ali Gill, a candidate of Pakistan Muslim League (N) (PML-N).

He ran for the seat of the Provincial Assembly of the Punjab as a candidate of PPP from Constituency PP-49 (Faisalabad-VII) in the 1997 Pakistani general election but was unsuccessful. He received 16,079 votes and lost the seat to Mazhar Ali Gill, a candidate of PML-N.

He ran for the seat of the National Assembly of Pakistan from Constituency NA-79 (Faisalabad-V) as a candidate of PPP in the 2002 Pakistani general election but was unsuccessful. He received 56,773 votes and lost the seat to Safdar Shaker, a candidate of Pakistan Muslim League (Q) (PML-Q).

He was elected to the National Assembly from Constituency NA-79 (Faisalabad-V) as an independent candidate in the 2008 Pakistani general election after which he re-joined PPP. He received 58,563 votes and defeated Safdar Shakir, a candidate of PML-Q. In the same election, he was re-elected to the Provincial Assembly of the Punjab as an independent candidate from Constituency PP-59 (Faisalabad-IX). He received 35,575 votes and defeated Arif Mahmood Gill. He vacated the Punjab Assembly seat.

In November 2008, he was inducted into the federal cabinet of Prime Minister Yousaf Raza Gillani and was appointed as Federal Minister for Textile Industry where he continued to serve until February 2011. From April 2012 to June 2012, he served as Federal Minister for Climate Change. In June 2012, he was inducted into the federal cabinet of Prime Minister Raja Pervez Ashraf and was appointed as Federal Minister for Climate Change where he continued to serve until March 2013.

He ran for the seat of the National Assembly as a candidate of PPP from Constituency NA-79 (Faisalabad-V) in the 2013 Pakistani general election but was unsuccessful. He received 21,716 votes and lost the seat to Chaudhry Shehbaz Babar. In the same election, he ran for the seat of the Provincial Assembly of the Punjab as a candidate of PPP from Constituency PP-59 (Faisalabad-IX) but was unsuccessful. He received 12,376 votes and lost the seat to Arif Mahmood Gill.
