= Nanaksar =

- Interactive map of Nanaksar
- Coordinates

Nanaksar is a village in the Punjab province of Pakistan. It is located at 31°4'0N 72°53'0E with an altitude of 171 metres (564 feet). Neighbouring settlements include Nara Dada and Rashiana. The population is unknown.
