= PP-105 Faisalabad-VIII =

Constituency of the Punjabi Provincial Legislature, Pakistan

- Constituency for the Provincial Assembly of Punjab
- Region: Samundri Tehsil (partly) including Samundri City of Faisalabad District

Current constituency
- Created from: PP-60 Faisalabad-X (2002-2018); PP-102 Faisalabad-VI (2018-2023)

PP-105 Faisalabad-VIII (پی پی-105، فیصل آباد-8) is a Constituency of Provincial Assembly of Punjab.

== General elections 2024 ==
Provincial election 2024: PP-105 Faisalabad-VIII
Party	Candidate	Votes	%	±%
PML(N)	Rao Kashif Rahim Khan	58,185	41.81	
Independent	Adil Pervaiz Gujjar (Note: Filed nomination papers as PTI candidate but ECP allowed him to run as an Independent)	56,268	40.43	
TLP	Mujahid Farooq	9,163	6.58	
PPP	Rai Imtiaz Ahmad Asif	8,900	6.40	
PML(Q)	Nabeel Nabi	2,773	1.99	
Others	Others (seventeen candidates)	3,883	2.79	
Turnout		143,245	51.07	
Total valid votes		139,172	97.16	
Rejected ballots		4,073	2.84	
Majority		1,917	1.38	
Registered electors		280,474		
hold				

== General elections 2018 ==
Provincial election 2018: PP-102 Faisalabad-VI
Party	Candidate	Votes	%	±%
PTI	Adil Pervaiz Gujjar	38,121	31.12	
PML(N)	Sikandar Hayyat Khan	36,960	30.17	
PPP	Hassan Sardar	10,414	8.50	
Independent	Muhammad Mushtaq Ahmad	8,579	7.00	
Independent	Muhammad Sher Nasir	4,213	3.44	
Independent	Mujahid Farooq	4,051	3.31	
Independent	Awais Attique	3,738	3.05	
TLP	Aamir Akram	3,349	2.73	
Independent	Altaf Hussain	3,282	2.68	
MMA	Abdul Rasheed	3,148	2.57	
Independent	Muhammad Shakoor	3,052	2.49	
Independent	Ashfaq Ahmad	1,224	1.00	
Others	Others (twelve candidates)	2,359	1.94	
Turnout		125,445	56.83	
Total valid votes		122,490	97.64	
Rejected ballots		2,955	2.36	
Majority		1,161	0.95	
Registered electors		220,727		

== General elections 2013 ==
Provincial election 2013: PP-60 Faisalabad-X
Party	Candidate	Votes	%	±%
PML(N)	Rao Kashif Raheem Khan	44,775	44.43	
PML(Q)	Choudhry Khalid Nabi Advocate	14,023	13.92	
Independent	Major (R) Muhammad Akram	11,839	11.75	
Independent	Choudhry Ghulam Rasool	9,606	9.53	
SIC	Muhammad Faheem Akhtar	8,505	8.44	
PTI	Muhammad Yahya Nasir Advocate	7,104	7.05	
PPP	Malik Muhammad Ali Shad Advocate	2,633	2.61	
Others	Others (eighteen candidates)	2,281	2.26	
Turnout		103,417	59.53	
Total valid votes		100,766	97.44	
Rejected ballots		2,651	2.56	
Majority		30,752	30.51	
Registered electors		173,717		

== General elections 2008 ==
Contesting candidates	Party affiliation	Votes polled Irfan Muhammad

== See also ==
- PP-104 Faisalabad-VII
- PP-106 Faisalabad-IX
