= Gariwal =

- Location within Pakistan
- Coordinates: 31.04°N 72.53°E
- Country: Pakistan
- Province: Punjab
- District: Toba Tek Singh
- Time zone: UTC+5 (PST)

Gariwal is a village in the Punjab province of Pakistan. It is located at 31°4'0N 72°53'0E with an altitude of 171 metres (564 feet). Neighbouring settlements include Nara Dada and Rashiana.
