= Pathanwala =

Village in Punjab, Pakistan

Chak 535 GB, also known as Pathanwala, is a village in Faisalabad district of Punjab, Pakistan. The village is located near Samundari Road.
