= NA-98 Faisalabad-IV =

Constituency of the National Assembly of Pakistan

- Constituency for the National Assembly of Pakistan
- Region: Samundri Tehsil of Faisalabad District
- Electorate: 579,457

Current constituency
- Party: Pakistan Muslim League (N)
- Member: Chaudhry Shehbaz Babar
- Created from: NA-78 Faisalabad-IV; NA-79 Faisalabad-V

NA-98 Faisalabad-IV (این اے-98، فیصل آباد-۴) is a constituency for the National Assembly of Pakistan comprising mainly Sammundri Tehsil from the former NA-79 and the town of Mamu Kanjan in Tandlian Wala Tehsil from the former NA-78. The remaining part of Tandlian Wala Tehsil, which was previously in NA-78, is now in NA-103.

== Members of Parliament ==
=== 2018–2023: NA-104 Faisalabad-IV ===
Election	Member	Party
2018	Chaudhry Shehbaz Babar	PML (N)

=== 2024–present: NA-98 Faisalabad-IV ===
Election	Member	Party
2024	Chaudhry Shehbaz Babar	PML(N)

== Election 2002 ==
General elections were held on 10 October 2002. Rajab Ali Khan Baloch of PML-Q won by 57,071 votes.

General election 2002: NA-78 Faisalabad-IV
Party	Candidate	Votes	%	±%
PML(Q)	Rajab Ali Khan Baloch	57,071	41.91	
PML(N)	Peerzada Muhammad Ashraf Zia	41,026	30.13	
PPP	M. Ishaque Shafqat Bloch	30,260	22.22	
MMA	Peer Karim Ullah Shah	6,404	4.70	
Others	Others (two candidates)	1,408	1.04	
Turnout		141,279	45.36	
Total valid votes		136,169	96.38	
Rejected ballots		5,110	3.62	
Majority		16,045	11.78	
Registered electors		311,445		

== Election 2008 ==
General elections were held on 18 February 2008. Raheela Perveen of Pakistan Peoples Party Parliamentarian (PPPP) succeeded with 79,127 votes in the election and became the member of National Assembly.

General election 2008: NA-78 Faisalabad-IV
Party	Candidate	Votes	%	±%
PPP	Raheela Perveen	79,127	55.88	
PML(Q)	Mian Rajab Ali Khan Baloch	59,231	41.83	
Others	Others (two candidates)	3,240	2.29	
Turnout		146,981	53.80	
Total valid votes		141,598	96.34	
Rejected ballots		5,383	3.66	
Majority		19,896	14.05	
Registered electors		273,193		
PPP gain from PML(Q)				

== Election 2013 ==
General elections were held on 11 May 2013. Rajab Ali Khan Baloch of PML-N won by 88,162 votes and became the member of National Assembly.

General election 2013: NA-78 Faisalabad-IV
Party	Candidate	Votes	%	±%
PML(N)	Rajab Ali Khan Baloch	88,162	49.81	
Independent	Muhammad Safdar Shakir	45,924	25.94	
PPP	Shahadat Ali Khan Baloch	23,274	13.15	
PTI	Saadullah Mehmood Urf Muhammad Yasir Baloch	11,297	6.38	
Others	Others (five candidates)	8,351	4.72	
Turnout		189,496	62.75	
Total valid votes		177,008	93.41	
Rejected ballots		12,488	6.59	
Majority		42,238	23.87	
Registered electors		301,973		
PML(N) gain from PPP				

== Election 2018 ==
General elections were held on 25 July 2018.

General election 2018: NA-104 Faisalabad-IV
Party	Candidate	Votes	%	±%
PML(N)	Chaudhry Shehbaz Babar	95,099	34.47	
PTI	Sardar Dildar Ahmed Cheema	73,320	26.57	
Independent	Khalid Mehmood Gul	57,362	20.79	
Others	Others (eleven candidates)	42,028	15.23	
Turnout		275,925	55.88	
Rejected ballots		8,116	2.94	
Majority		21,779	7.90	
Registered electors		493,818		
PML(N) hold		Swing	N/A	

== Election 2024 ==
General elections were held on 8 February 2024. Chaudhry Shehbaz Babar won the election with 119,599 votes.

General election 2024: NA-98 Faisalabad-IV
Party	Candidate	Votes	%	±%
PML(N)	Chaudhry Shehbaz Babar	119,599	41.81	▲6.94
PTI	Hafiz Mumtaz Ahmed (Note: Filed nomination papers as PTI candidate but ECP allowed him to run as an Independent)	105,653	36.93	▲10.36
PPP	Rana Muhammad Farooq Saeed Khan	29,507	10.32	▲2.21
TLP	Muhammad Jawad Saleem	15,606	5.46	
Others	Others (sixteen candidates)	15,729	5.49	
Turnout		294,765	50.87	▼5.01
Total valid votes		286,054	97.04	
Rejected ballots		8,711	2.96	
Majority		13,906	4.86	▼3.04
Registered electors		579,457		
PML(N) hold		Swing	N/A	

== See also ==
- NA-97 Faisalabad-III
- NA-99 Faisalabad-V
