= Chak 217 GB =

Village in Punjab, Pakistan

- Village
- Chak No.217 GB Gujjar Pind
- Interactive map of Chak 217 GB
- Coordinates: 31.016694°N 72.8567818°E
- Country: Pakistan
- Province: Panjāb
- District: Faisalabad District
- Tehsil: Samundri Tehsil

Chak 217 GB (Urdu: چک 217 ج ب), or Gujjar Pind, is a suburban village of Tehsil Samundri in Faisalabad district, Punjab, in Pakistan. The first known settlements in the village date from 1898 to 1920. The village comprises roughly 1,500 acres. Water is supplied by five irrigation channels, known locally as moga. The "GB" suffix in the village name refers to Gogera Branch canal that irrigates the area.

== Demographics ==
Most of the population there are Gujjars. Some emigrated from Hoshyarpur in 1898, during Sandal Bar colonization.
