= PP-108 Faisalabad-XI =

Constituency of the Punjabi Provincial Legislature, Pakistan

- Constituency for the Provincial Assembly of Punjab
- Region: Faisalabad Sadar Tehsil (partly) of Faisalabad District

Current constituency
- Created from: PP-63 Faisalabad-XIII (2002-2018); PP-108 Faisalabad-XII (2018-2023)

PP-108 Faisalabad-XI (پی پی-108، فیصل آباد-11) is a Constituency of Provincial Assembly of Punjab.

== General elections 2024 ==
Provincial election 2024: PP-108 Faisalabad-XI
Party	Candidate	Votes	%	±%
Independent	Aftab Ahmad Khan (Note: Filed nomination papers as PTI candidate but ECP allowed him to run as an Independent)	60,687	44.33	
PML(N)	Muhammad Ajmal	56,848	41.53	
Independent	Shahid Raza	7,574	5.53	
PPP	Sidra Saeed	4,552	3.33	
Independent	Ahsan UI Haq	2,650	1.94	
Others	Others (eight candidates)	4,581	3.34	
Turnout		142,878	55.07	
Total valid votes		136,892	95.81	
Rejected ballots		5,986	4.19	
Majority		3,839	2.80	
Registered electors		259,461		
hold				

== General elections 2018 ==
Provincial election 2018: PP-108 Faisalabad-XII
Party	Candidate	Votes	%	±%
PML(N)	Muhammad Ajmal	46,055	42.13	
PTI	Aftab Ahmad Khan	43,471	39.77	
Independent	Shabbir Hussain Khan	8,476	7.75	
TLP	Muhammad Maqsood	5,357	4.90	
Independent	Aziz Ur Rehman	5,012	4.59	
Others	Others (six candidates)	948	0.86	
Turnout		112,318	59.04	
Total valid votes		109,319	97.33	
Rejected ballots		2,999	2.67	
Majority		2,584	2.36	
Registered electors		190,232		

== General elections 2013 ==
Provincial election 2013: PP-63 Faisalabad-XIII
Party	Candidate	Votes	%	±%
PML(N)	Ajmal Asif	60,309	62.21	
PPP	Shabbir Hussain Khan	25,025	25.81	
PTI	Muhammad Naeem Azeem	8,663	8.94	
JI	Ikram Ullah Khan	1,458	1.50	
Others	Others (fifteen candidates)	1,493	1.54	
Turnout		99,158	60.86	
Total valid votes		96,948	97.77	
Rejected ballots		2,210	2.23	
Majority		35,284	36.40	
Registered electors		162,936		

== General elections 2008 ==
Contesting candidates	Party affiliation	Votes polled

== See also ==
- PP-107 Faisalabad-X
- PP-109 Faisalabad-XII
