= NA-105 Toba Tek Singh-I =

Constituency of the National Assembly of Pakistan

- Constituency for the National Assembly of Pakistan
- Region: Gojra Tehsil and Toba Tek Singh Tehsil (partly) of Toba Tek Singh District
- Electorate: 513,857

Current constituency
- Party: Pakistan Tehreek-e-Insaf
- Member: Usama Hamza
- Created from: NA-92 Toba Tek Singh-I

NA-105 Toba Tek Singh-I (این اے-105، ٹوبہ ٹيک سنگھ-١) is a constituency for the National Assembly of Pakistan.

== Members of Parliament ==
=== 2018–2023: NA-111 Toba Tek Singh-I ===
Election	Member	Party
2018	Chaudhary Khalid Javed	PML (N)

=== 2024–present: NA-105 Toba Tek Singh-I ===
Election	Member	Party
2024	Usama Hamza	PTI

== Election 2002 ==
General elections were held on 10 October 2002. Amjad Ali Warriach of PML-J won by 61,746 votes.

General election 2002: NA-92 Toba Tek Singh-I
Party	Candidate	Votes	%	±%
PML(J)	Amjad Ali Warraich	61,746	37.78	
PML(N)	Muhammad Hamza	51,416	31.46	
PPP	Muhammad Ishaq	49,584	30.33	
Others	Others (two candidates)	713	0.43	
Turnout		167,491	52.64	
Total valid votes		163,459	97.59	
Rejected ballots		4,032	2.41	
Majority		10,330	6.32	
Registered electors		318,208		

== Election 2008 ==
General elections were held on 18 February 2008. Farkhanda Amjad Warraich of PML-Q won by 69,827 votes.

General election 2008: NA-92 Toba Tek Singh-I
Party	Candidate	Votes	%	±%
PML(Q)	Farkhanda Amjad	69,827	41.27	
PML(N)	Muhammad Hamza	57,203	33.81	
PPP	Muhammad Khalid Bashir	42,180	24.93	
Turnout		173,336	60.43	
Total valid votes		169,210	97.62	
Rejected ballots		4,126	2.38	
Majority		12,624	7.46	
Registered electors		286,827		
PML(Q) gain from PML(J)				

== Election 2013 ==
General elections were held on 11 May 2013. Chaudhry Khalid Javaid Warraich of PML-N won by 91,903 votes and became the member of National Assembly.

General election 2013: NA-92 Toba Tek Singh-I
Party	Candidate	Votes	%	±%
PML(N)	Chaudhary Khalid Javed	91,903	42.52	
Independent	Usama Hamza	61,961	28.67	
PNML	Amjad Ali Warraich	36,871	17.06	
PTI	Khalid Mehmood Chatha	12,248	5.67	
Others	Others (ten candidates)	13,163	6.08	
Turnout		224,204	63.25	
Total valid votes		216,146	96.41	
Rejected ballots		8,058	3.59	
Majority		29,942	13.85	
Registered electors		354,476		
PML(N) gain from PML(Q)				

== Election 2018 ==
General elections were held on 25 July 2018.

General election 2018: NA-111 Toba Tek Singh-I
Party	Candidate	Votes	%	±%
PML(N)	Chaudhary Khalid Javed	110,556	44.84	
PTI	Usama Hamza	85,448	34.65	
PNML	Amjad Ali Warraich	34,849	14.13	
Others	Others (eight candidates)	15,715	6.38	
Turnout		256,255	58.32	
Total valid votes		246,568	96.22	
Rejected ballots		9,687	3.78	
Majority		25,108	10.19	
Registered electors		439,361		
PML(N) hold		Swing	N/A	

== Election 2024 ==
General elections were held on 8 February 2024. Usama Hamza won the election with 138,494 votes.

General election 2024: NA-111 Toba Tek Singh-I
Party	Candidate	Votes	%	±%
PTI	Usama Hamza (Note: Filed nomination papers as PTI candidate but ECP allowed him to run as an Independent)	138,494	48.51	▲13.86
PML(N)	Chaudhary Khalid Javed	108,003	37.83	▼7.01
Others	Others (fifteen candidates)	38,976	13.65	
Turnout		291,505	56.73	▼1.59
Total valid votes		285,473	97.93	
Rejected ballots		6,032	2.07	
Majority		30,491	10.68	
Registered electors		513,857		

== See also ==
- NA-104 Faisalabad-X
- NA-106 Toba Tek Singh-II
