= Naz Khialvi =

Pakistani poet

- Born: Muhammad Siddique; 12 December 1947; Chak NO 392 GB Tandlianwala, Faisalabad District, Punjab, Pakistan
- Died: December 12, 2010 (aged 63); Hujra Sabri, Kanjwani, Tandlianwala, Faisalabad District
- Occupations: Lyricist, poet, radio broadcaster
- Known for: Sandal Dharti
- Notable work: Tum Ek Gorakh Dhanda Ho (You are a Puzzle)

Muhammad Siddique ناز خیالوی (12 December 1947 – 12 December 2010), pen name Naz Khialvi, was a Pakistani lyricist and radio broadcaster, who is mainly known for his Sufi verse Tum Ek Gorakh Dhanda Ho (You are a Puzzle), later sung by Nusrat Fateh Ali Khan, a legendary Qawwali singer, making both of them a household name. He also hosted a radio programme, Sandhal Dharti at Faisalabad radio station for 27 years.

== Biography ==
Muhammad Siddique, pen name Naz Khialvi, born in Jhok Khyali Chak No 394 GB, in Tandlianwala Tehsil, Faisalabad District, 174 km from Lahore, in Punjab, Pakistan. Khialvi later became a broadcaster with state-run radio, and also hosted a radio programme, Sandhal Dharti on Faisalabad radio station for 27 years.

He also wrote lyrics in Urdu and Punjabi.

== Teacher ==
Naaz Khialvi lived many years with famous Urdu poet Ehsan Danish. According to him, Ehsan Danish is the real inspiration for him. He had learnt much from him.

== Books ==
Khialvi's first Book "SaaiaN Way", comprising Punjabi "kaafi", was published by Misaal Publishers, Faisalabad in 2009; and his second book "Lahu kay Phool" which was later changed to "Tum Ik Gorakh Dhanda Ho", comprising Urdu ghazals, was still under compilation.

== Award(s) ==
Naz Khialvi was awarded the "Excellence in Radio Compering Award" in 2000.
