= Chaudhry Zafar Iqbal Nagra =

Pakistani politician (born 1970)

Member of the Provincial Assembly of the Punjab
- Incumbent
- Assumed office 24 February 2024
- Constituency: PP-109 Faisalabad-XIII
- In office 15 August 2018 – 14 January 2023
- Constituency: PP-109 Faisalabad-XIII
- In office 31 May 2013 – 31 May 2018
- Constituency: PP-64 Faisalabad-XIII
- In office 13 February 2008 – 13 February 2013
- Constituency: PP-64 Faisalabad-XIII

Personal details
- Born: 25 March 1970 (age 56)
- Party: PMLN (2008-present)

Chaudhry Zafar Iqbal Nagra (born 25 March 1970) is a Pakistani politician who is an incumbent Member of the Provincial Assembly of the Punjab since 10 February 2024. Previously he was a Member of the Provincial Assembly of the Punjab, from February 2008 to February 2013; then from May 2013 to May 2018 and afterwards from July 2018 till January 2023 (for 3 consecutive terms; each term comprising 5 years).

== Early life and education ==
He was born in Faisalabad.

He graduated in 2002 from University of the Punjab and has a degree of Bachelor of Arts.

== Political career ==
He was elected to the Provincial Assembly of the Punjab as a candidate of Pakistan Muslim League (N) (PML-N) from Constituency PP-64 (Faisalabad-XIV) in the 2008 Pakistani general election. He received 32,635 votes and defeated Nadeem Aftab Sandhu, a candidate of Pakistan Peoples Party (PPP).

He was re-elected to the Provincial Assembly of the Punjab as an independent candidate from Constituency PP-64 (Faisalabad-XIV) in the 2013 Pakistani general election. He received 55,789 votes and defeated Kashif Nawaz Randhawa of PML-N and Nadeem Aftab Sandhu, a candidate of Pakistan Peoples Party (PPP). He joined PML-N in May 2013.

He was re-elected for the third time to Provincial Assembly of the Punjab as a candidate of PML-N from Constituency PP-109 (Faisalabad-XIII) in the 2018 Pakistani general election. He received 45,312 Votes and defeated Nadeem Aftab Sandhu, a candidate of Pakistan Tehreek-e-Insaf (PTI) for the 3rd time; consecutively.

He was re-elected for the fourth time to Provincial Assembly of the Punjab as a candidate of PML-N from Constituency PP-110 (Faisalabad-XIII) in the 2024 Pakistani general election. He received 55,911 Votes and defeated Nadeem Aftab Sandhu, a candidate of Pakistan Tehreek-e-Insaf (PTI) for the 4th time; consecutively.
