= Adil Pervaiz Gujjar =

Pakistani politician

Member of the Provincial Assembly of the Punjab
- In office 15 August 2018 – 14 January 2023
- Constituency: PP-102 Faisalabad-VI

Personal details
- Born: 13 January 1960 (age 66)
- Party: PTI (2018-present)

Adil Pervaiz Gujjar is a Pakistani politician who had been a member of the Provincial Assembly of the Punjab from August 2018 till January 2023.

== Political career ==
He was elected to the Provincial Assembly of the Punjab as a candidate of the Pakistan Tehreek-e-Insaf (PTI) from PP-102 (Faisalabad-VI) in the 2018 Punjab provincial election.

He ran for a seat in the Provincial Assembly from PP-105 Faisalabad-VIII as a candidate of the PTI in the 2024 Punjab provincial election. He was defeated by Rao Kashif Rahim Khan of PML-N by a heavy margin of 58,185 Votes.
