= PP-56 Faisalabad-VI =

Former constituency of the Punjabi Provincial Legislature, Pakistan

- Former constituency for the Provincial Assembly of Punjab

Former constituency
- Created: 2002
- Abolished: 2018
- Replaced by: PP-105 Faisalabad-VIII

PP-56 Faisalabad-VI was a Constituency of Provincial Assembly of Punjab. This constituency is abolished after 2018 delimitations after 2017 Census

== See also ==
- Punjab, Pakistan
