= Jafar Ali Hocha =

Pakistani politician

Member of the Provincial Assembly of the Punjab
- Incumbent
- Assumed office 24 February 2024
- Constituency: PP-104 Faisalabad-VII
- In office 24 October 2018 – 14 January 2023
- Constituency: PP-103 Faisalabad-VII
- In office 29 May 2013 – 31 May 2018
- Constituency: PP-57 Faisalabad-VII

Personal details
- Born: 9 September 1979 (age 47) Faisalabad, Punjab, Pakistan
- Party: PMLN (2013-present)

Jafar Ali Hocha is a Pakistani politician who is an incumbent Member of the Provincial Assembly of the Punjab since 10 February 2024. He also has been a Member of the Provincial Assembly of the Punjab, from May 2013 to May 2018 and from October 2018 to January 2023.

== Early life and education ==
He was born on 9 September 1979 in Faisalabad.

He graduated from Government College of Science and has a degree of Bachelor of Arts.

== Political career ==
He was elected to the Provincial Assembly of the Punjab as a candidate of Pakistan Muslim League (N) (PML-N) from Constituency PP-57 (Faisalabad-VII) in the 2013 Pakistani general election.

He was re-elected to the Provincial Assembly of the Punjab as a candidate of PML-N from Constituency PP-103 (Faisalabad-VII) in the 2018 Pakistani general election.

He was re-elected for 3rd consecutive term to the Provincial Assembly of the Punjab as a candidate of PML-N from Constituency PP-104 (Faisalabad-VII) in the 2024 Pakistani general election.
