= PP-107 Faisalabad-X =

Constituency of the Punjabi Provincial Legislature, Pakistan

- Constituency for the Provincial Assembly of Punjab
- Region: Faisalabad Sadar Tehsil (partly) including Dijkot city of Faisalabad District

Current constituency
- Created from: PP-61 Faisalabad-XI (2002-2018); PP-106 Faisalabad-X (2018-2023)

PP-107 Faisalabad-X (پی پی-107، فیصل آباد-10) is a Constituency of Provincial Assembly of Punjab.

== General elections 2024 ==
Provincial election 2024: PP-107 Faisalabad-X
Party	Candidate	Votes	%	±%
Independent	Javed Niaz Manj (Note: Filed nomination papers as PTI candidate but ECP allowed him to run as an Independent)	27,672	20.59	
PML(N)	Khalid Pervaz	26,374	19.63	
Independent	Jahanzab Mohsin	23,584	17.55	
Independent	Sultan Ali Khan	17,776	13.23	
Independent	Azhar Javed	13,350	9.94	
Independent	Saif Ullah	12,415	9.24	
TLP	Muhammad Rafaqat	5,717	4.26	
Others	Others (twenty five candidates)	7,487	5.56	
Turnout		138,313	52.89	
Total valid votes		134,375	97.15	
Rejected ballots		3,938	2.85	
Majority		1,298	0.96	
Registered electors		261,522		
hold				

== General elections 2018 ==
Provincial election 2018: PP-106 Faisalabad-X
Party	Candidate	Votes	%	±%
Independent	Umar Farooq	49,996	39.73	
PTI	Sardar Dilnawaz Ahmad Cheema	40,413	32.12	
PML(N)	Khalid Pervaz	28,186	22.40	
TLP	Muhammad Ilyas	4,265	3.39	
Others	Others (sixteen candidates)	2,973	2.36	
Turnout		129,967	56.40	
Total valid votes		125,833	96.82	
Rejected ballots		4,134	3.18	
Majority		9,583	7.61	
Registered electors		230,429		

== General elections 2013 ==
Provincial election 2013: PP-61 Faisalabad-XI
Party	Candidate	Votes	%	±%
Independent	Naeem Ullah Gill	25,882	30.40	
PML(Q)	Ch. Khalid Pervaiz Gill	23,844	28.01	
PTI	Javed Niaz Manj	9,141	10.74	
Independent	Rana Mukhtar Ahmed Khan	8,986	10.56	
PML(N)	Ch. Saifullah Gill (Restrained By Supreme Court)	8,661	10.17	
Independent	Ch. Yasir Shoaib Gujjar	4,961	5.83	
JI	Abid Usman	1,105	1.30	
Others	Others (ten candidates)	2,553	3.00	
Turnout		89,044	59.59	
Total valid votes		85,133	95.61	
Rejected ballots		3,911	4.39	
Majority		2,038	2.39	
Registered electors		149,424		

== General elections 2008 ==
Contesting candidates	Party affiliation	Votes polled

== See also ==
- PP-106 Faisalabad-IX
- PP-108 Faisalabad-XI
