= Saadullah Khan Baloch =

Member of the National Assembly of Pakistan from Faisalabad (2024–2029)

- سعدُ ﷲ خان بلوچ

Member of the National Assembly of Pakistan
- Incumbent
- Assumed office 29 February 2024
- Constituency: NA-97 Faisalabad-III

Personal details
- Born: 13 February 1970 (age 56) Faisalabad, Punjab, Pakistan
- Party: PTI (2024-present)

Muhammad Saadullah Khan Baloch (Urdu: محمد سعدُ ﷲ خان بلوچ), is a Pakistani politician who is member of the National Assembly of Pakistan since February 2024.

== Political career ==
Baloch was elected to the National Assembly of Pakistan from NA-97 Faisalabad-III as an Independent candidate supported by Pakistan Tehreek-e-Insaf (PTI) in the 2024 Pakistani general election. He received 72,846 votes while runner up Ali Gohar Khan of Pakistan Muslim League (N) (PML (N)) received 70,532 votes.
