= Rahela Baloch =

Pakistani politician

Rahela Shahadat Baloch

Member of the National Assembly of Pakistan
- In office 2008–2013
- Constituency: NA-78 (Faisalabad-IV)

Rahela Shahadat Baloch is a Pakistani politician who had been a member of the National Assembly of Pakistan from 2008 to 2013.

== Family background ==
Her father Khan Shahadat Khan Baloch also remained Member National Assembly of Pakistan from 1988-1990 and 1993-1996 on Pakistan Peoples Party ticket.

== Political career ==
She was elected to the National Assembly of Pakistan from Constituency NA-78 (Faisalabad-IV) as a candidate of Pakistan Peoples Party (PPP) in the 2008 Pakistani general election. She received 79,127 votes and defeated Rajab Ali Khan Baloch.

In June 2012, she was inducted into the federal cabinet of Prime Minister Raja Pervaiz Ashraf and was appointed as Minister of State for Science and Technology where she continued to serve until March 2013.
