= Arif Mahmood =

Arif Mahmood or Mehmood may refer to:

- Arif Mehmood (born 1983), Pakistani footballer

== See also ==
- Asif Mahmood, Pakistani cricketer
- Arif Mahmood Gill, Pakistani politician from Punjab
