= Mahallam =

- Village
- Location within Pakistan
- Coordinates: 30°53′05″N 72°26′25″E
- Country: Pakistan
- Province: Punjab
- District: Faisalabad
- Time zone: UTC+5 (PST)

Mahallam is a village of Faisalabad District, in central part of the Punjab province in Pakistan.
