= PP-109 Faisalabad-XII =

Constituency of the Punjabi Provincial Legislature, Pakistan

- Constituency for the Provincial Assembly of Punjab
- Region: Faisalabad Saddar Tehsil (partly) in Faisalabad District

Current constituency
- Created from: PP-64 Faisalabad-XIV (2002-2018); PP-109 Faisalabad-XIII (2018-2023)

PP-109 Faisalabad-XII (پی پی-109، فیصل آباد-12) is a Constituency of Provincial Assembly of Punjab.

== General elections 2024 ==
Provincial election 2024: PP-109 Faisalabad-XII
| Party | Candidate | Votes | % | ±% |
|---|---|---|---|---|
| PML(N) | Chaudhry Zafar Iqbal Nagra | 54,585 | 40.84 | |
| Independent | Hafiz Atta Ullah (Note: Filed nomination papers as PTI candidate but ECP allowed him to run as an Independent) | 54,251 | 40.59 | |
| TLP | Naveed Shafi | 7,712 | 5.77 | |
| Independent | Muhammad Rafiq | 6,654 | 4.98 | |
| PPP | Muhammad Amir Hayat | 2,566 | 1.92 | |
| JI | Zafar Idrees | 2,134 | 1.60 | |
| PMML | Muhammad Siddique | 2,025 | 1.52 | |
| Others | Others (fourteen candidates) | 3,720 | 2.78 | |
| Turnout | | 138,066 | 55.58 | |
| Total valid votes | | 133,647 | 96.80 | |
| Rejected ballots | | 4,419 | 3.20 | |
| Majority | | 334 | 0.25 | |
| Registered electors | | 248,419 | | |
| hold | | | | |

== General elections 2018 ==
Provincial election 2018: PP-109 Faisalabad-XIII
| Party | Candidate | Votes | % | ±% |
|---|---|---|---|---|
| PML(N) | Chaudhry Zafar Iqbal Nagra | 53,100 | 47.69 | |
| PTI | Nadeem Aftab Sindhu | 46,129 | 41.43 | |
| TLP | Basharat Ali | 4,404 | 3.96 | |
| Independent | Chaudhary Ahmed Nawaz | 3,775 | 3.39 | |
| MMA | Muhammad Azeem Randhawa | 2,007 | 1.80 | |
| Independent | Rana Asif Sadiq Khan | 1,314 | 1.18 | |
| Others | Others (five candidates) | 605 | 0.55 | |
| Turnout | | 114,227 | 58.98 | |
| Total valid votes | | 111,334 | 97.47 | |
| Rejected ballots | | 2,893 | 2.53 | |
| Majority | | 6,971 | 6.26 | |
| Registered electors | | 193,681 | | |

== General elections 2013 ==
Provincial election 2013: PP-64 Faisalabad-XIV
| Party | Candidate | Votes | % | ±% |
|---|---|---|---|---|
| Independent | Chaudhry Zafar Iqbal Nagra | 55,789 | 51.64 | |
| PML(N) | Kashif Nawaz | 23,723 | 21.96 | |
| PPP | Nadeem Aftab Sindhu | 18,488 | 17.11 | |
| PTI | Ch. Abdul Majeed Advocate High Court | 5,858 | 5.42 | |
| Independent | Farzand Ali Randhawa | 1,621 | 1.50 | |
| Others | Others (nine candidates) | 2,560 | 2.37 | |
| Turnout | | 113,045 | 62.42 | |
| Total valid votes | | 108,039 | 95.57 | |
| Rejected ballots | | 5,006 | 4.43 | |
| Majority | | 32,066 | 29.68 | |
| Registered electors | | 181,095 | | |

== General elections 2008 ==
Provincial election 2008: PP-64 Faisalabad-XIV
| Party | Candidate | Votes | % | ±% |
|---|---|---|---|---|
| PML(N) | Zafar Iqbal Nagra | 32,635 | | |
| PPP | Jehanzeb Imtiaz Gill | 27,261 | | |
| PML(Q) | Ch. Khalid Saddique Dhillon | 12,328 | | |
| Independent | Hafiz Atta Ullah | 146 | | |
| Independent | Ch. Misbah Ud Din Zaigum | 43 | | |
| Independent | Asif Javed | 33 | | |
| Independent | Farzand Ali Randhawa | 21 | | |

== See also ==
- PP-108 Faisalabad-XI
- PP-110 Faisalabad-XIII
