= Beetal =

Breed of goat

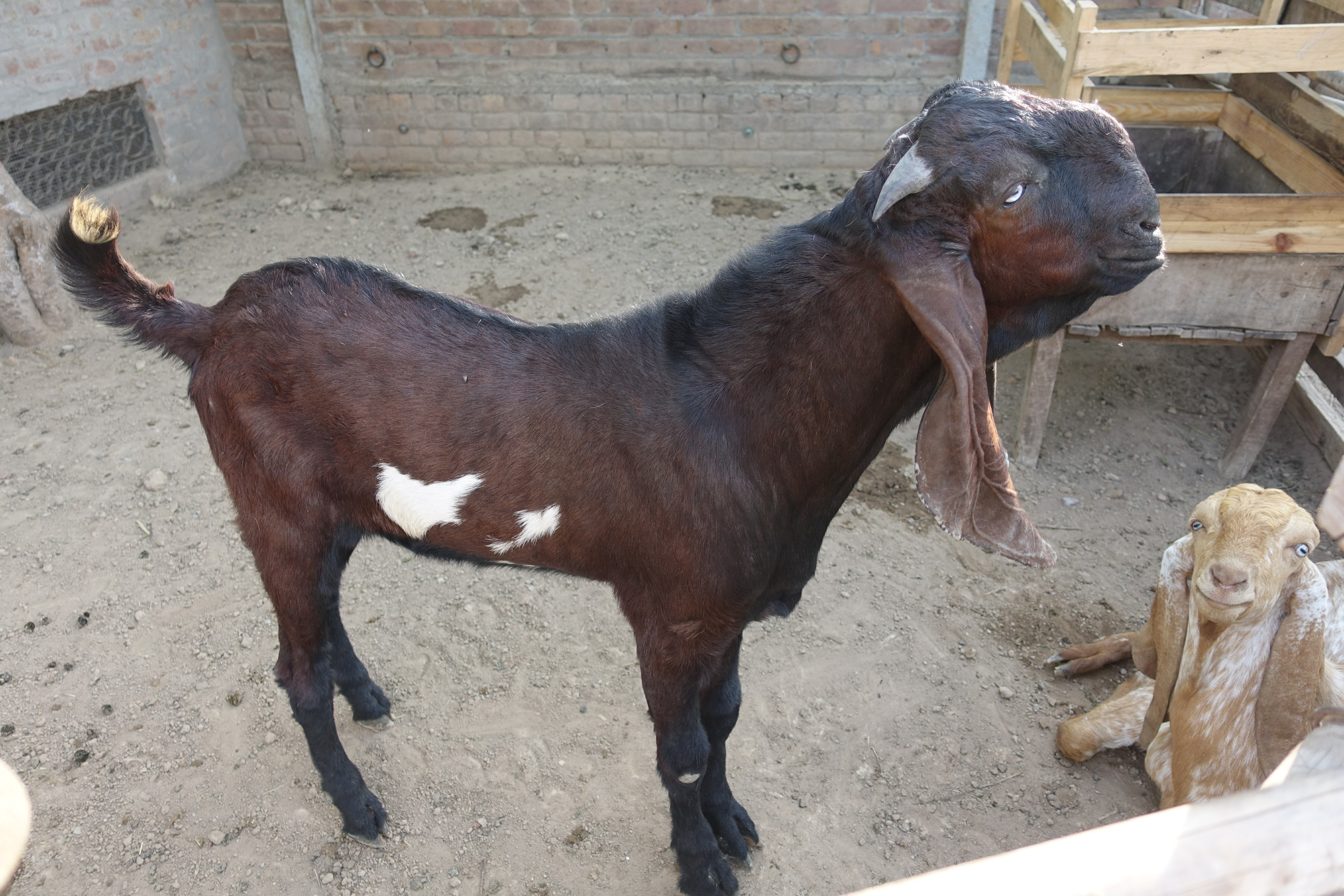
Beetal goats at a local breeder's in Faisalabad, Punjab - Pakistan.

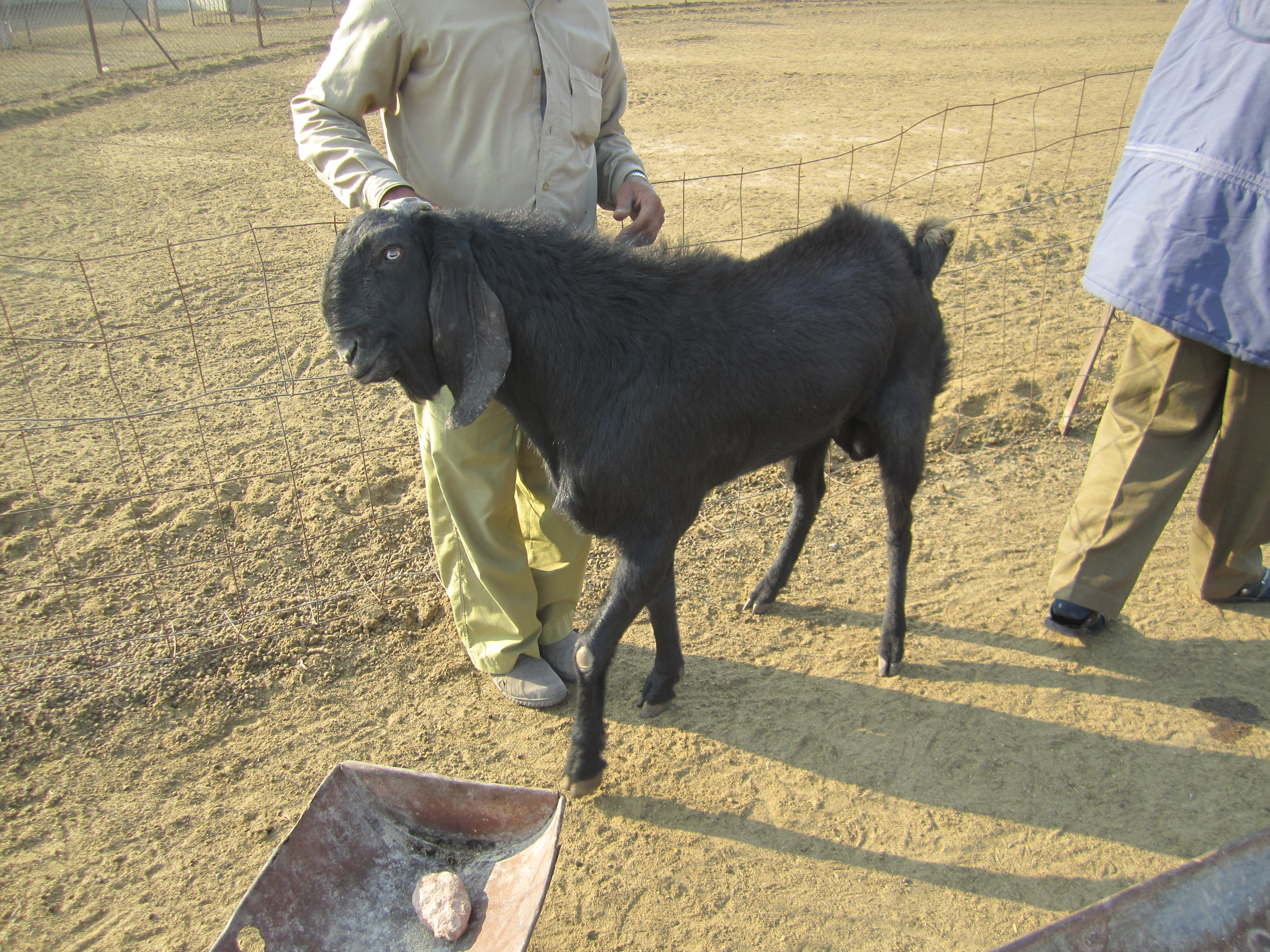
Beetal goat

The Beetal goat is a breed from the Punjab region of India and Pakistan, used for milk and meat production. It is similar to the Jamnapari goat and the Malabari goat.

It is also known as Lahori goat; it is considered to be a good milker with large body size. Ears are flat, long, curled and drooping. The skin of these goats is considered to be of high quality because of its large size and its yielding of fine leather such as velour, suede, and chamois for manufacturing clothes, shoes, and gloves. Beetal goats have been widely used for improvement of local goats throughout the subcontinent. These goats are also adapted to stall feeding, thus are preferred for intensive goat farming.

The Beetal goat and the Malabari goats are usually compared for their body characteristics including testicles. The values of testicular breadth, length, height, volume and scrotal circumference greatly (P<0.01) exceed in the Malabari goat.
