= Niamuana =

- Village
- Location in Pakistan
- Coordinates: 31°20′20″N 73°05′25″E
- Country: Pakistan
- Province: Punjab
- District: Faisalabad
- Time zone: UTC+5 (PST)

Niamuana is a village located in Faisalabad District, of Punjab, Pakistan.
