= Chak Jhumra West Cabin railway station =

Railway station in Pakistan

General information
- Owner: Ministry of Railways

Other information
- Station code: WOC

History
- Former names: Great Indian Peninsula Railway

Chak Jhumra West Cabin railway station (Urdu: چک جھمرا ویسٹ کیبن ریلوے اسٹیشن) is located in Faisalabad district of Punjab province, Pakistan.

== See also ==
- List of railway stations in Pakistan
- Pakistan Railways
