= Ayesha Rajab Ali =

Pakistani politician

Member of the National Assembly of Pakistan
- In office 13 August 2018 – 10 August 2023
- Constituency: Reserved seat for women

Personal details
- Party: PPP (2025–present)
- Other political affiliations: IPP (2024–2025); PMLN (2018–2024)
- Spouse: Rajab Ali Khan Baloch (d. 2018)

Ayesha Rajab Ali is a Pakistani politician who had been a member of the National Assembly of Pakistan from August 2018 till August 2023.

== Political career ==
Ayeshaa Rajab Ali was elected to the National Assembly of Pakistan as a candidate of Pakistan Muslim League (N) (PML-N) on a reserved seat for women from Punjab in the 2018 Pakistani general election. She is the wife of late Rajab Ali Khan Baloch (24 September 1969 – 13 May 2018), who was also a Pakistani politician.

After not receiving the PML(N)'s nomination for any seat in the 2024 Pakistani general election, she decided to contest as an independent candidate from NA-97 Faisalabad-III.

On 3 February 2024, she joined the Istehkam-e-Pakistan Party (IPP). Consequently, she withdrew from the election and announced her support for Humayun Akhtar Khan, the IPP candidate.
