= PP-106 Faisalabad-IX =

Constituency of the Punjabi Provincial Legislature, Pakistan

- Constituency for the Provincial Assembly of Punjab
- Region: Jaranwala Tehsil (partly) and Faisalabad Saddar Tehsil (partly) of Faisalabad District

Current constituency
- Created from: PP-55 Faisalabad-V (2002-2018); PP-99 Faisalabad-III (2018-2023)

PP-106 Faisalabad-IX (پی پی-106، فیصل آباد-9) is a Constituency of Provincial Assembly of Punjab.

== General elections 2024 ==
Provincial election 2024: PP-106 Faisalabad-IX
Party	Candidate	Votes	%	±%
Independent	Ahsan Raza (Note: Filed nomination papers as PTI candidate but ECP allowed him to run as an Independent)	51,945	44.62	
IPP	Ali Akhtar	25,639	22.02	
TLP	Muhammad Rafique	10,412	8.94	
Independent	Zahid Imran	4,996	4.29	
Independent	Muhammad Muzamil Irshad	4,914	4.22	
Pakistan Muslim Markazi League	Nawaz Ahmad Cheema	4,828	4.15	
Independent	Tariq Javed	3,197	2.75	
JI	Khadam Hussain Shah	2,267	1.95	
Others	Others (twenty four candidates)	8,220	7.06	
Turnout		121,002	52.63	
Total valid votes		116,418	96.21	
Rejected ballots		4,584	3.79	
Majority		26,306	22.60	
Registered electors		229,915		
hold				

== General elections 2018 ==
Provincial election 2018: PP-99 Faisalabad-III
Party	Candidate	Votes	%	±%
PTI	Ali Akhter	49,260	45.79	
PML(N)	Akbar Ali	43,765	40.69	
AAT	Sohail Iqbal	5,504	5.12	
Independent	Irfan Amin	3,116	2.90	
PST	Kashif Hussain Attari Qadri	2,676	2.49	
PPP	Mian Abu Bakar Hamza	1,895	1.76	
Others	Others (eleven candidates)	1,353	1.25	
Turnout		110,537	57.30	
Total valid votes		107,569	97.32	
Rejected ballots		2,968	2.68	
Majority		5,495	5.10	
Registered electors		192,915		

== General elections 2013 ==
Provincial election 2013: PP-55 Faisalabad-V
Party	Candidate	Votes	%	±%
PML(N)	Rana Shoaib Adrees Khan	52,861	60.13	
PML(Q)	Zaheer Ud Din	27,117	30.85	
PTI	Zafar Iqbal Sarwar	4,491	5.11	
PST	Kashif Husain Attari Qadri	1,315	1.50	
Others	Others (eighteen candidates)	2,122	2.41	
Turnout		90,083	62.24	
Total valid votes		87,906	97.58	
Rejected ballots		2,177	2.42	
Majority		25,744	29.28	
Registered electors		144,745		

== General elections 2008 ==
Contesting candidates	Party affiliation	Votes polled

== See also ==
- PP-105 Faisalabad-VIII
- PP-107 Faisalabad-X
