= Karamsar =

Coordinates: 31°08′N 72°59′E

- Village
- Chak No. 373 GB Karamsar
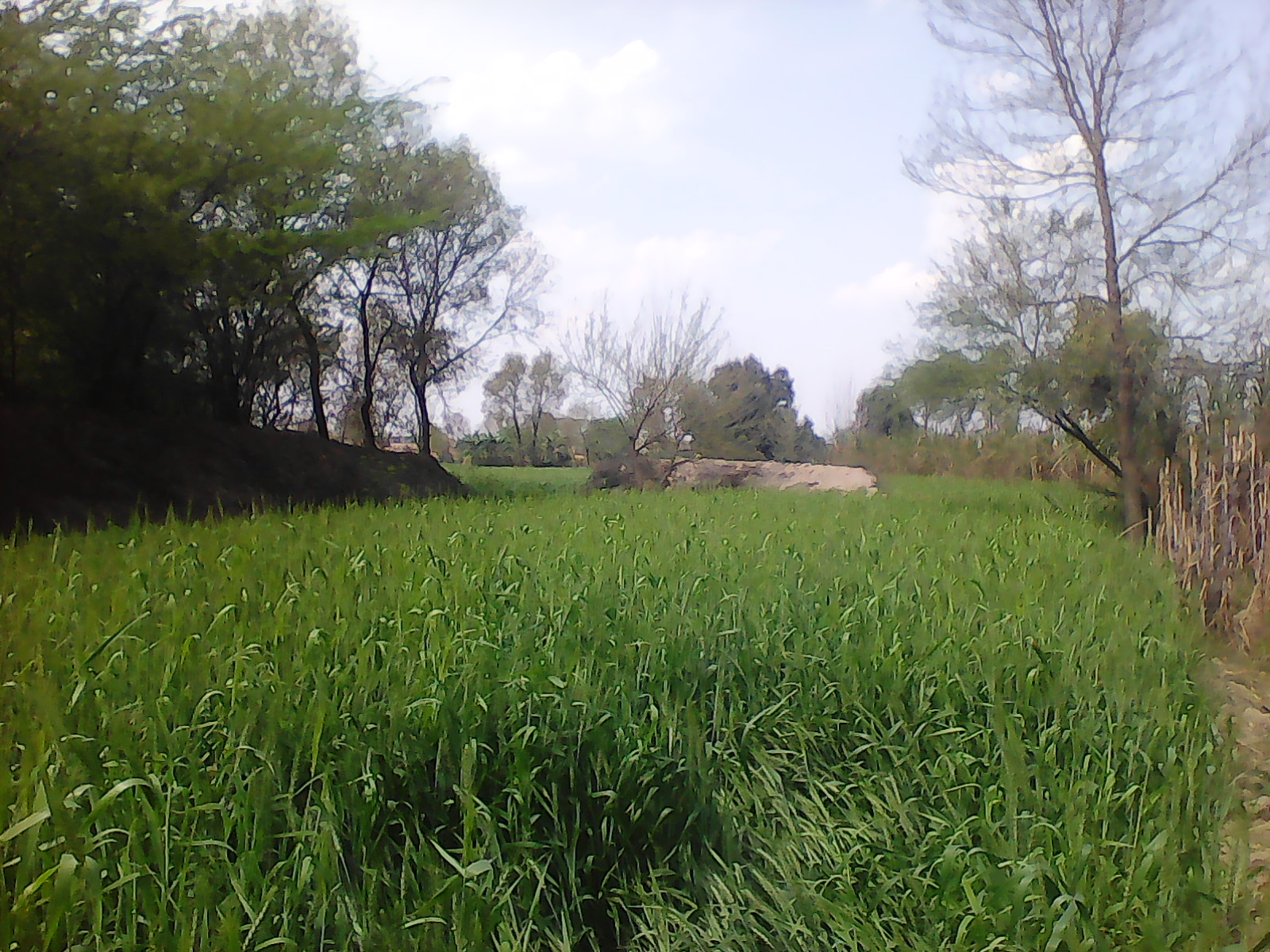
- Interactive map of Karamsar
- Time zone: GMT+5
- Postal code: 37300
- Area code: 041
- Website: http://www.karamsar.ga

Karamsar (Urdu: كرم سر) is a village in Faisalabad District, of Punjab province of Pakistan.
