= Rajab Ali Khan Baloch =

Pakistani politician (1969-2018)

- رجب علی خان بلوچ

Member of the National Assembly of Pakistan
- In office 1 June 2013 – 13 May 2018
- Constituency: NA-78 (Faisalabad)
- In office 2002–2007
- Constituency: NA-78 (Faisalabad)

Personal details
- Born: 24 September 1969
- Died: 13 May 2018 (aged 48) Lahore, Punjab, Pakistan
- Party: Pakistan Muslim League (N)
- Spouse: Ayesha Rajab Ali
- Relations: Ali Gohar Khan (brother)

Rajab Ali Khan Baloch (Urdu: رجب علی خان بلوچ; 24 September 1969 – 13 May 2018) was a Pakistani politician who was a member of the National Assembly of Pakistan between 2002 and 2018.

== Early life ==
Baloch was born on 24 September 1969 in a Village Chak No. 455 G.B. Kanjwani, Tehsil Tandlianwala, District Faisalabad. He was the cousin of former MNA and Minister of State for Education Mian Nasir ali Khan Baloch.

== Political career ==
Baloch's political career started during the reign of Pervez Musharraf. He replaced Mian Nasir Ali Khan Baloch, his cousin, as a candidate in the constituency NA 78. He was elected to the National Assembly of Pakistan as a candidate of Pakistan Muslim League (Q) (PML-Q) from Constituency NA-78 (Faisalabad) in the 2002 Pakistani general election. He received 57,071 votes and defeated Peerzada Ashraf Zia, a candidate of Pakistan Muslim League (N) (PML-N).

Baloch ran for the seat of the National Assembly as a candidate of the PML-Q from Constituency NA-78 (Faisalabad) in the 2008 Pakistani general election but was unsuccessful. He received 59,231 votes and lost the seat to Rahela Baloch.

Baloch was re-elected to the National Assembly as a candidate of PML-N from Constituency NA-78 (Faisalabad) in the 2013 Pakistani general election. But before it, he along with his brother Ali Goher Baloch and cousin Mian Nasir Ali Khan Baloch met Imran Khan the chairman of PTI for the party ticket which was not confirmed by Khan and later he decided to approach PMLN. He received 88,162 votes and defeated an independent candidate, Muhammad Safdar Shakir. During his tenure as Member of the National Assembly, he served as Federal Parliamentary Secretary for National Food Security and Resources.

== Death ==
Baloch was died on 13 May 2018 in Lahore where he was under treatment for cancer.
