= Chaudhary Khalid Javed =

Pakistani politician

- چوہدری خالد جاوید

Member of the National Assembly of Pakistan
- In office 13 August 2018 – 10 August 2023
- Constituency: NA-111 (Toba Tek Singh-I)
- In office 1 June 2013 – 31 May 2018
- Constituency: NA-92 (Toba Tek Singh)

Personal details
- Party: PMLN (1993-present)
- Other political affiliations: IND (1988-1993)
- Relatives: Bilal Asghar Warraich (brother)

Chaudhry Khalid Javaid Warraich (Urdu: چوہدری خالد جاوید وڑائچ) is a Pakistani politician who had been a member of the National Assembly of Pakistan from August 2018 till August 2023. Previously, he was a member of the National Assembly from June 2013 to May 2018 and was a Member of the Provincial Assembly of the Punjab from 1993 to 1999.

== Political career ==
He ran for the seat of the Provincial Assembly of the Punjab as an independent candidate for Constituency PP-76 (Toba Tek Singh) in the 1988 Pakistani general election but was unsuccessful. He received 16,965 votes and lost the seat to Muhammad Khalid Malik, a candidate of Pakistan Peoples Party (PPP).

He was elected to the Provincial Assembly of the Punjab as an independent candidate for Constituency PP-76 (Toba Tek Singh) in the 1993 Pakistani general election. He received 23,266 votes and defeated Chaudhry Zafar Iqbal, a candidate of Pakistan Muslim League (N) (PML-N). During his tenure as Member of the Punjab Assembly, he served as Parliamentary Secretary for Communication and Works.

He was re-elected to the Provincial Assembly of the Punjab as an independent candidate for Constituency PP-76 (Toba Tek Singh) in the 1997 Pakistani general election. He received 21,602 votes and defeated Muzaffar Ahmad Cheema, a candidate of PML-N.

He ran for the seat of the Provincial Assembly of the Punjab for Constituency PP-90 (Toba Tek Singh-VII) in the 2002 Pakistani general election but was unsuccessful. He received 14,558 votes and lost the seat to an independent candidate, Liaquat Ali Shoukat.

He was elected to the National Assembly of Pakistan for Constituency NA-92 (Toba Tek Singh-I) in the 2013 Pakistani general election. He received 91,903 votes and defeated an independent candidate, Usama Hamza.

He was re-elected to the National Assembly from Constituency NA-111 (Toba Tek Singh-I) in the 2018 Pakistani general election. He received 110,556 votes and defeated Usama Hamza, a candidate of Pakistan Tehreek-e-Insaf (PTI).

He contested the 2024 Pakistani general election as a candidate of PML(N) from NA-105 Toba Tek Singh-I, but was unsuccessful. He received 108,003 votes and was defeated by Usama Hamza, an independent candidate.

== See also ==
- National Assembly of Pakistan
- Senate of Pakistan
