= PP-110 Faisalabad-XIII =

Punjab constituency

- Constituency for the Provincial Assembly of Punjab
- Region: Faisalabad city area in Faisalabad District

Current constituency
- Created from: PP-65 Faisalabad-XV (2002-2018); PP-117 Faisalabad-XXI (2018-2023)

PP-110 Faisalabad-XIII (پی پی-110، فیصل آباد-13) is a Constituency of Provincial Assembly of Punjab.

== General elections 2024 ==
Provincial election 2024: PP-110 Faisalabad-XIII
Party	Candidate	Votes	%	±%
Independent	Hassan Zaka (Note: Filed nomination papers as PTI candidate but ECP allowed him to run as an Independent)	46,839	47.64	
PML(N)	Hamid Rashid	32,031	32.58	
Independent	Pervez Akhtar	6,913	7.03	
TLP	Shakeel Hussain	6,259	6.37	
Others	Others (twenty two candidates)	6,268	6.38	
Turnout		100,003	51.98	
Total valid votes		98,310	98.31	
Rejected ballots		1,693	1.69	
Majority		14,808	15.06	
Registered electors		192,379		
hold				

== General elections 2018 ==
Provincial election 2018: PP-117 Faisalabad-XXI
Party	Candidate	Votes	%	±%
PML(N)	Mehr Hamid Rashid	48,757	46.99	
PTI	Hassan Masood	41,584	40.08	
TLP	Ali Raza	4,429	4.27	
PPP	Sadiq Ali	2,956	2.85	
AAT	Atta Ur Rehman	2,304	2.22	
SIC	Sahibzada Muhammad Hassan Raza	1,682	1.62	
Others	Others (twelve candidates)	2,052	1.97	
Turnout		105,823	57.31	
Total valid votes		103,764	98.05	
Rejected ballots		2,059	1.95	
Majority		7,173	6.91	
Registered electors		184,668		

== General elections 2013 ==
Provincial election 2013: PP-65 Faisalabad-XV
Party	Candidate	Votes	%	±%
PML(N)	Haji Muhammad Ilyas Ansari	64,645	63.28	
PPP	Raja Riaz Ahmed	17,571	17.20	
PTI	Hammad Khan	14,654	14.34	
AWP	Rana Muhammad Tahir	2,198	2.15	
Independent	Nasir Ali	1,104	1.08	
Others	Others (twenty one candidates)	1,985	1.94	
Turnout		103,724	58.58	
Total valid votes		102,157	98.49	
Rejected ballots		1,567	1.51	
Majority		47,074	46.08	
Registered electors		177,078		

== General elections 2008 ==
Contesting candidates	Party affiliation	Votes polled

== See also ==
- PP-109 Faisalabad-XII
- PP-111 Faisalabad-XIV
