= NA-97 Faisalabad-III =

Constituency of the National Assembly of Pakistan

- Constituency for the National Assembly of Pakistan
- Region: Tandlianwala Tehsil of Faisalabad District
- Electorate: 491,703

Current constituency
- Party: Pakistan Tehreek-e-Insaf
- Member: Saadullah Khan Baloch
- Created from: NA-77 Faisalabad-III

NA-97 Faisalabad-III (این اے-97، فیصل آباد-۳) is a constituency for the National Assembly of Pakistan. In addition to the areas of the former NA-77, the constituency represents all of Tandlianwala Tehsil apart from the town of Mamu Kanjan, which is in NA-104.

== Members of Parliament ==
=== 2018–2023: NA-103 (Faisalabad-III) ===
Election	Member	Party
By-election 2018	Ali Gohar Khan	PML (N)

=== 2024–present: NA-97 Faisalabad-III ===
Election	Member	Party
2024	Saadullah Khan Baloch	PTI

== Election 2002 ==
General elections were held on 10 October 2002. Chaudhry Muhammad Asim Nazir of PML-Q won by 63,296 votes.

General election 2002: NA-77 Faisalabad-III
Party	Candidate	Votes	%	±%
PML(Q)	Muhammad Asim Nazir	63,296	50.02	
PML(N)	Muhammad Akram Ch.	26,542	20.97	
PPP	Khizar Abbas	25,125	19.85	
MMA	Rai Muhammad Akram Khan Kharal	9,176	7.25	
Others	Others (three candidates)	2,413	1.91	
Turnout		130,722	47.07	
Total valid votes		126,552	96.81	
Rejected ballots		4,171	3.19	
Majority		36,754	29.05	
Registered electors		277,749		

== Election 2008 ==
The result of general election 2008 in this constituency is given below.

=== Result ===
Muhammad Asim Nazir succeeded in the election 2008 and became the member of National Assembly.

General election 2008: NA-77 Faisalabad-III
Party	Candidate	Votes	%	±%
PML(Q)	Muhammad Asim Nazir	63,776	46.05	
PML(N)	Muhammad Tallal Ch.	49,807	35.96	
PPP	Sajjad Ahmad Awan	23,959	17.30	
Others	Others (eight candidates)	948	0.69	
Turnout		141,806	58.97	
Total valid votes		138,490	97.66	
Rejected ballots		3,316	2.34	
Majority		13,969	10.09	
Registered electors		240,482		
PML(Q) hold				

== Election 2013 ==
General elections were held on 11 May 2013.

General election 2013: NA-77 Faisalabad-III
Party	Candidate	Votes	%	±%
PML(N)	Muhammad Asim Nazir	98,057	55.89	
PML(Q)	Zaheer Ud Din	58,680	33.45	
PTI	Rai Naeem Asad Kharal	10,444	5.95	
Others	Others (fifteen candidates)	8,263	4.71	
Turnout		181,111	61.46	
Total valid votes		175,444	96.87	
Rejected ballots		5,667	3.13	
Majority		39,377	22.44	
Registered electors		294,667		
PML(N) gain from PML(Q)				

== Election 2018 ==
Electoral process was scheduled to be held on 25 July 2018, but got postponed due to suicide of a candidate.

== By-election 2018 ==
By-elections were held in this constituency on 14 October 2018.

By-election 2018: NA-103 Faisalabad-III
Party	Candidate	Votes	%	±%
PML(N)	Ali Gohar Khan	77,539	38.03	−19.47
PTI	Saadullah Khan Baloch	66,627	32.68	+26.68
PPP	Shahadat Ali Khan	25,113	12.32	
Independent	Zulfiqar Ali	20,242	9.93	
Others	Others (seven candidates)	14,367	7.04	
Turnout		209,995	48.00	
Total valid votes		203,888	97.09	
Rejected ballots		6,107	2.91	
Majority		10,912	5.35	
Registered electors		437,460		
PML(N) hold		Swing	N/A	

== Election 2024 ==
General elections were held on 8 February 2024. Saadullah Khan Baloch won the election with 72,846 votes.

General election 2024: NA-97 Faisalabad-III
Party	Candidate	Votes	%	±%
PTI	Saadullah Khan Baloch (Note: Filed nomination papers as PTI candidate but ECP allowed him to run as an Independent)	72,846	30.02	▼2.66
PML(N)	Ali Gohar Khan	70,532	29.07	▼8.96
PPP	Muhammad Khan Nadeem	32,651	13.46	▲1.14
IPP	Humayun Akhtar Khan	30,447	12.55	
TLP	Hafiz Abid Hussain	10,442	4.30	
JI	Mudasser Ahmad Shah	6,902	2.85	
Others	Others (sixteencandidates)	18,802	7.75	
Turnout		251,820	51.21	▲3.21
Total valid votes		242,622	96.35	
Rejected ballots		9,198	3.65	
Majority		2,314	0.95	
Registered electors		491,703		

== See also ==
- NA-96 Faisalabad-II
- NA-98 Faisalabad-IV
