= PP-103 Faisalabad-VI =

Constituency of the Punjabi Provincial Legislature, Pakistan

- Constituency for the Provincial Assembly of Punjab
- Region: Tandlianwala Tehsil (partly) of Faisalabad District

Current constituency
- Created from: PP-58 Faisalabad-VIII (2002-2018); PP-104 Faisalabad-VIII (2018-2023)

PP-103 Faisalabad-VI (پی پی-103، فیصل آباد-6) is a Constituency of Provincial Assembly of Punjab.

== General elections 2024 ==
Provincial election 2024: PP-103 Faisalabad-VI
Party	Candidate	Votes	%	±%
Independent	Noor Shahid Noor (Note: Filed nomination papers as PTI candidate but ECP allowed him to run as an Independent)	35,508	30.00	
PML(N)	Muhammad Safdar Shakir	26,913	22.74	
Independent	Syed Ghulam Abdul Rasool	15,950	13.48	
TLP	Salabat Hussain	15,034	12.70	
PPP	Riasat Ali Sagar	9,008	7.61	
Independent	Atta Muhammad	5,471	4.62	
IPP	Rana Naeem Iqbal	4,467	3.77	
Others	Others (nineteen candidates)	6,008	5.08	
Turnout		123,520	51.35	
Total valid votes		118,359	95.82	
Rejected ballots		5,161	4.18	
Majority		8,595	7.26	
Registered electors		240,568		
hold				

== General elections 2018 ==
Provincial election 2018: PP-104 Faisalabad-VIII
Party	Candidate	Votes	%	±%
PML(N)	Muhammad Safdar Shakir	42,756	34.56	
PTI	Shahid Khalil Noor	33,400	27.00	
Independent	Syed Ghulam Abdul Rasool	19,945	16.12	
Independent	Rana Naeem Iqbal	11,361	9.18	
APML	Atta Muhammad	7,658	6.19	
Independent	Riasat Ali Sagar	2,594	2.10	
TLP	Amjad Raza	1,906	1.54	
MMA	Muhammad Saqib Saeed	1,222	0.99	
Others	Others (ten candidates)	2,861	2.32	
Turnout		128,008	55.84	
Total valid votes		123,703	96.64	
Rejected ballots		4,305	3.36	
Majority		9,356	7.56	
Registered electors		229,242		

== General elections 2013 ==
Provincial election 2013: PP-58 Faisalabad-VIII
Party	Candidate	Votes	%	±%
Independent	Ehsan Riaz Fatiana	29,068	31.51	
PML(N)	Shahid Khalil Noor	27,686	30.01	
Independent	Almaroof Irfan Muhamamd Sadullah Khan Baloch	17,681	19.17	
PTI	Rana Naeem Iqbal Khan	7,026	7.62	
PPP	Arslan Shoukat	6,145	6.66	
SIC	Rana Muhamamd Wakeel Joiya	2,061	2.23	
PML(Q)	Firdous Bibi Fatiana	1,686	1.83	
Others	Others (four candidates)	901	0.98	
Turnout		98,310	62.85	
Total valid votes		92,254	93.84	
Rejected ballots		6,056	6.16	
Majority		1,382	1.50	
Registered electors		156,423		

== General elections 2008 ==
Contesting Candidates	Party Affiliation	Votes Polled

== See also ==
- PP-102 Faisalabad-V
- PP-104 Faisalabad-VII
