= Muhammad Hamza =

Pakistani politician (1929–2021)

Member of the Senate of Pakistan
- In office March 2012 – March 2018

Chairman Public Accounts Committee
- In office 1997–1999

Member of the National Assembly of Pakistan
- In office 1997–1999
- Constituency: NA-73 (Toba Tek Singh-III)

Member of the National Assembly of Pakistan
- In office 1993–1996
- Constituency: NA-73 (Toba Tek Singh-III)

Chairman Public Accounts Committee
- In office 1990–1993

Member of the National Assembly of Pakistan
- In office 1990–1993
- Constituency: NA-73 (Toba Tek Singh-III)

Member of the National Assembly of Pakistan
- In office 1985–1988
- Constituency: NA-80 (Toba Tek Singh-III)

Member of the Majlis-ash-Shura Pakistan
- In office 1982–1985

President Pakistan National Alliance Punjab
- In office 1977–1978

Member of the West Pakistan Legislative Assembly
- In office 1965–1969
- Constituency: Lyallpur-VI

Member of the West Pakistan Legislative Assembly
- In office 1962–1965
- Constituency: Lyallpur-VI

Personal details
- Born: 20 March 1929 Ludhiana, Punjab Province, British India
- Died: 29 August 2021 (aged 92)
- Children: Usama Hamza (son)
- Education: Government College University Lahore (BA); Punjab University (MA)

Muhammad Hamza (20 March 1929 – 29 August 2021) was a Pakistani politician who was a member of Senate of Pakistan from March 2012 to March 2018 and member of the National Assembly of Pakistan between 1985 and 1999. He was an elected member of the West Pakistan Legislative Assembly from 1962 to 1969. Hamza served twice as chairman of the Public Accounts Committee of the National Assembly of Pakistan. He is known in Pakistani politics for his neutral views and fierce opposition. Hamza was considered one of the closest aides to Fatima Jinnah, the sister of Pakistan's founder Mohammad Ali Jinnah.

== Early life ==
Hamza was born on 20 March 1929 in Ludhiana, Indian Punjab in an Arain family. His father Moulvi Abdullah was a prominent figure among Muslims in India.

He received his early education from Islamia School in Wait Ganj. Before partition he used to live in Muhalla Dholewal on Brown Road in Ludhiana. He migrated to Pakistan during the final year of his Bachelors. In Punjab, Government College, Lahore, was considered the number one college at the time, followed by Government College for Boys, Ludhiana. He pursued BA Economics from Government College in Ludhiana, but completed the third year from Government College in Lahore after partition. He earned his Master of Arts in Economics from the University of the Punjab in 1951.

He migrated to Gojra, Pakistan in 1947. During his visit back to Ludhiana in 2015, he expressed his love for his birthplace. Reciting the verse of great Persian poet Sheikh Saadi he said, "A place where a person is born is better for him than being the ruler of Egypt."

== Political career ==
Hamza was known for his neutral views in Pakistani politics. He remained vocal on political issues for almost six decades. He was one of a few West Pakistan Assembly members who were very much vocal against military dictator General Ayub Khan on the assembly floor. He as an MNA remained a critic of his own Prime Minister Nawaz Sharif but when Pervaiz Musharraf removed Nawaz Sharif, Hamza stood by him in his bad days.

Hamza was a member of the West Pakistan Legislative Assembly from Lyallpur-VI Constituency from 1962 to 1965 and again from 1965 to 1969. During his tenure as member of the West Pakistan Legislative Assembly, he was very vocal against then President of Pakistan, Ayub Khan. He was one of the three opposition members, supported by Fatima Jinnah who were elected through BD system. He was considered as a close aide to Fatima Jinnah in the presidential elections of 1965. Toba Tek Singh was the only city other than Karachi in West Pakistan where Fatima Jinnah won.

Hamza held public protests across the country during the 1968 Movement in Pakistan against the military regime of Ayub Khan and was taken into custody on numerous occasions. President Ayub Khan resigned in the face of growing public protests and was succeeded by General Yahya Khan. Hamza stood against the martial law of Yahya Khan and was a front-line leader for civil democracy in Pakistan.

Hamza was a fierce opponent of the ruling party of Zulfiqar Ali Bhutto in the 1970s. He was amongst the prominent leaders of the Pakistan National Alliance (PNA), a nine-party coalition against the ruling Pakistan Peoples Party (PPP). He was elected as the president of the Pakistan National Alliance in Punjab. Under his leadership several protests were staged in Punjab against alleged rigging in 1977's general elections. The protests of 1977 called for overthrow; Zia ul Haq became chief martial law administrator after declaring martial law in the country in 1978.

He was selected as a member of Majlis e Shura (Federal Council) in 1982. His constituency Gojra was awarded the status of 'tehsil' of District Toba Tek Singh.

He was elected to the National Assembly of Pakistan from Constituency NA-80 (Toba Tek Singh-III) in the 1985 general election. He remained a prominent member of the treasury benches led by PM Muhammad Khan Junejo, but remained a critic on many issues against his own government.

Hamza's was the only voice of opposition in the parliament the day when 295-C was passed immediately. During his speech in 1986, he argued that the Islamic texts being cited by those advocating for the death penalty needed to be comprehensively reviewed by religious scholars before any change in the law could be passed. He said parliament was being irresponsible by avoiding a deeper debate on the issue. "I have a firm opinion", said Hamza, "you cannot run the country on selective justice. What is the purpose of the law if it's destructive for the society? Our people lack depth, they are unreasonably emotional about religion, so I know that the law will be misused – that's why I am opposing."

He ran for the seat of the National Assembly as a candidate of Islami Jamhoori Ittehad (IJI) from Constituency NA-73 (Toba Tek Singh-III) in the 1988 general election but was unsuccessful. He received 52,137 votes and lost the seat to Haji Muhammad Ishaq, a candidate of the PPP. He remained highly critical of then Prime Minister Benazir Bhutto.

He was re-elected to the National Assembly as a candidate of IJI from Constituency NA-73 (Toba Tek Singh-III) in the 1990 general election. He received 69,499 votes and defeated Haji Muhammad Ishaq, a candidate of the Pakistan Democratic Alliance (PDA). He was appointed chairman of the Public Accounts Committee. He remained vocal against the corruption of the former ruling party and was considered a trustworthy and close aide to PM Nawaz Sharif.

He was re-elected to the National Assembly as a candidate of the Pakistan Muslim League (N) (PML-N) from Constituency NA-73 (Toba Tek Singh-III) in the 1993 general election. He received 48,419 votes and defeated Haji Muhammad Ishaq, a candidate of the PPP.

He was re-elected to the National Assembly as a candidate of PML-N from Constituency NA-73 (Toba Tek Singh-III) in the 1997 general election. He received 43,931 votes and defeated Amjad Ali Warraich, an independent candidate, and became the chairman of the Public Accounts Committee for the second term. During his second tenure as chairman of the Public Accounts Committee in the National Assembly, he remained highly critical of his Prime Minister. He became close to Nawaz Sharif following the 1999 Pakistani coup d'état. He was among the notable leaders who resisted the Emergency imposed by the Army chief General Musharraf.

He ran for the seat in the National Assembly for Constituency NA-92 (Toba Tek Singh-I) in the 2002 general election as a candidate of PML-N, but was unsuccessful. He received 51,416 votes and lost the seat to Amjad Ali Warraich, a candidate of the Pakistan Muslim League (J).

He ran again as a candidate of PML-N for the same seat in the National Assembly from constituency NA-92 (Toba Tek Singh-I) in the 2008 general election but was unsuccessful. He received 57,203 votes and lost the seat to Farkhanda Amjad. Despite losing his seat, Hamza remained active in politics and was a central figure of the opposition party PMLN. He took active participation in the Lawyers' Movement and spent five days in solitary confinement in Dera Ghazi Khan jail at the age of 79.

In 2012, he was allocated a PML-N ticket to contest the 2012 Senate election. He was awarded the Senate ticket by party chief Nawaz Sharif although he had not applied to the party for it. He was a member of five of the Senate's standing committees: the National Food Security and Research Committee, the National Health Services Regulation and Coordination Committee, the Energy Committee, the Privatization and Statistics Committee and the Religious Affairs and Interfaith Harmony Committee.

During his visit to his place of birth in Ludhiana in 2015, Hamza was awarded the title of "Fakhar-e-Ludhiana" (Pride of Ludhiana). Emotional after reaching his birthplace, he said, "I feel very happy to be in Ludhiana again but also feel pain for not seeing people who were with me in the city before Partition."

In February 2018, he was noted amongst the 52 members of the Senate who were set to retire on 11 March 2018. This ended the 56 years of parliamentary political struggle of one of the most prominent opposition leaders of Pakistan.

In July 2018, Hamza announced his support for the PTI in general elections. His son Usama contested elections as a PTI candidate from his constituency of Gojra. Hamza also announced he would not remain active in politics due to his old age.

During his long political career, Hamza faced incarceration for many years. He was one of the few politicians of the country who had no corruption allegations against them. He stayed close to the masses whether as an MNA, a senator or without any position and moved on the Gojra roads and streets by bicycle. He was unable to use his bicycle in the last few years and was forced to walk with the help of a walker.

== Death and funeral ==
Hamza tested positive for COVID-19 on 20 August 2021, but had recovered from the disease. In his last days, however, Hamza's saturation levels dipped again and he died of post-COVID complications on Sunday, 29 August 2021.

On 30 August 2021, a funeral prayer for Hamza was offered at Government Degree College for Boys around 9:30 am PKT before he was laid to rest in Kabootaranwala Graveyard in Gojra. His funeral prayers were estimated to be the largest gathering in the history of Gojra. Political leaders, parliamentarians, and people from every field of life paid homage to the political and social struggle rendered by late M. Hamza. This marked the end of an era of the political and social struggle of one of the most prominent and vocal Opposition Leader and Parliamentarian of Pakistan.
