= Rao Kashif Raheem Khan =

Pakistani politician

Rao Kashif Rahim Khan

Member of the Provincial Assembly of the Punjab
- Incumbent
- Assumed office 24 February 2024
- Constituency: PP-105 Faisalabad-VII
- In office 30 May 2013 – 31 May 2018
- Constituency: PP-60 Faisalabad-VII
- In office 20 February 2008 – 20 February 2013
- Constituency: PP-60 Faisalabad-VII

Personal details
- Born: 1 March 1970 (age 56) Samundri, Punjab, Pakistan
- Party: PMLN (2008-present)

Rao Kashif Rahim Khan is a Pakistani politician who is an incumbent Member of the Provincial Assembly of the Punjab since 10 February 2024. Previously he was Member of the Provincial Assembly of the Punjab from 2008 to 2018 for 2 consecutive terms.

== Early life and education ==
He was born on 1 March 1970 in Samundri.

He has a degree of Master of Arts which obtained in 1996 and a degree of Bachelor of Laws he received in 2001 from Punjab University Law College.

== Political career ==
He is a grandson of Rao Akhtar Hussain Khan, who was a Chairman (PML) From Tandaliawala at 80s. He was elected to the Provincial Assembly of the Punjab as a candidate of Pakistan Muslim League (N) (PML-N) from Constituency PP-60 (Faisalabad-X) in the 2008 Pakistani general election. He received 21,664 votes and defeated a candidate of Pakistan Muslim League (Q).

He was re-elected to the Provincial Assembly of the Punjab as a candidate of PML-N from Constituency PP-60 (Samundari-X) in the 2013 Pakistani general election.

He was re-elected for the 3rd non-consecutive term to the Provincial Assembly of the Punjab as a candidate of PML-N from Constituency PP-105 (Faisalabad-X) in the 2024 Pakistani general election.
