= Usama Hamza =

Member of the National Assembly of Pakistan from Toba Tek Singh (2024–2029)

- اسامہ حمزہ

Member of the National Assembly of Pakistan
- Incumbent
- Assumed office 29 February 2024
- Constituency: NA-105 Toba Tek Singh-I

Personal details
- Party: PTI (2018-present)
- Parent: Muhammad Hamza (father)

Muhammad Usama Hamza (Urdu: محمد اسامہ حمزہ) is a Pakistani politician who has been a member of the National Assembly of Pakistan since February 2024.

== Political career ==
Hamza contested the 2013 Pakistani general election from NA-92 Toba Tek Singh-I as an independent candidate, but was unsuccessful. He received 60,933 votes and was defeated by Chaudhary Khalid Javed, a candidate of Pakistan Muslim League (N) (PML(N)).

He contested the 2018 Pakistani general election from NA-111 Toba Tek Singh-I as a candidate of Pakistan Tehreek-e-Insaf (PTI), but was unsuccessful. He received 85,448 votes and was defeated by Chaudhary Khalid Javed, a candidate of PML(N).

He was elected to the National Assembly of Pakistan in the 2024 Pakistani general election from NA-105 Toba Tek Singh-I as an Independent candidate supported by PTI. He received 138,494 votes while runner-up Chaudhary Khalid Javed of PML(N) received 108,003 votes.
