= Nara Dada =

- Location within Pakistan
- Coordinates: 31.06°N 72.53°E
- Country: Pakistan
- Province: Punjab
- District: Faisalabad
- Time zone: UTC+5 (PST)

Nara Dada (Urdu: ناراڈاڈا) (also known as 228 GB (Gugera Branch) is a village in Faisalabad District, Punjab, Pakistan on the Gojra-Samundari road. It had previously been part of Constituency NA-79 until its abolition.

The village predates the independence of Pakistan however it was rehabilitated by arrival of refugees from the district of Hoshiarpur, its name taken from the Indian villages of Nara and Dada, located within that district. The village is primarily inhabited by Rajputs belonging to the Naru and Dada lineages.

There are four mosques in Naradada. Jamia Masjid situated in the middle of the village, rebuilt in 2018. Most of the inhabitants are Muslim Rajputs who fled from anti-Muslim pogroms in India. There is also a small number of Christians living there.

Nara Dada is located near a road and acts as a hub to villages in the region. The land surrounding the village is not very fertile, and crops like wheat, sugarcane, and maize is grown there.
