= Arif Mahmood Gill =

Pakistani politician (born 1970)

Member of the Provincial Assembly of the Punjab
- Incumbent
- Assumed office 23 February 2024
- Constituency: Faisalabad District
- In office 29 May 2013 – 32 May 2018
- Constituency: Faisalabad District
- In office 25 November 2002 – 17 November 2007
- Constituency: Faisalabad District

Personal details
- Born: 20 February 1970 (age 56) Samundri, Punjab, Pakistan
- Party: PMLN (2023-present)
- Other political affiliations: PML(Q) (2022-2023); PTI (2018-2022); IND (2018); PMLN (2013-2018); IND (2008-2013); PML(Q) (2002–2008)

Punjab Assembly Lahore

Arif Mahmood Gill is a Pakistani politician who is an incumbent Member of the Provincial Assembly of the Punjab since February 2024. Previously he was a Member of the Provincial Assembly of the Punjab, from 2002 to 2007 and again from May 2013 to May 2018.

== Early life and education ==
He was born on 20 February 1970 in Samundri.

He graduated from Bahauddin Zakariya University in 2002.

== Political career ==
He was elected to the Provincial Assembly of the Punjab as a candidate of Pakistan Muslim League (Q) (PML-Q) from Constituency PP-59 (Faisalabad-IX) in the 2002 Pakistani general election. He received 24,457 votes and defeated Muhammad Tahir Chaudhry, a candidate of Pakistan Peoples Party (PPP).

He ran for the seat of the Provincial Assembly of the Punjab as a candidate of PML-Q from Constituency PP-59 (Faisalabad-IX) in the 2008 Pakistani general election, but was unsuccessful. He received 25,163 votes and lost the seat to Rana Muhammad Farooq Saeed Khan.

He was re-elected to the Provincial Assembly of the Punjab as a candidate of Pakistan Muslim League (N) (PML-N) from Constituency PP-59 (Faisalabad-IX) in the 2013 Pakistani general election. He received 48,397 votes and defeated Rana Muhammad Farooq Saeed Khan.

He ran for the seat of the Provincial Assembly of the Punjab as an independent candidate from Constituency PP-103 (Faisalabad-IX) in the 2018 Pakistani general election, but was unsuccessful. He received 26,501 votes and lost the seat to Hafiz Mumtaz Ahmad of PTI.

He was re-elected to the Provincial Assembly of the Punjab as a candidate of Pakistan Muslim League (N) (PML-N) from Constituency PP-104 (Faisalabad-IX) in the 2024 Pakistani general election. He received 45,933 votes and defeated Farooq Arshad of PTI.
