= Tandlianwala Tehsil =

Tehsil municipal administration area of Faisalabad, Pakistan

Tehsil Tandlianwala تحصیل تاندلیانوالہ
- Tehsil
- Location within Punjab, Pakistan Location within Pakistan
- Coordinates: 31°1′56″N 73°7′59″E
- Country: Pakistan
- Province: (Punjab, Pakistan) Punjab
- District: Faisalabad

Government
  - Type: Tehsil Municipal Administration
  - Assistant commissioner: Aqsa Imtiaz
  - MNA (NA-97): Muhammad Saad Ullah
  - MPA (PP-102 Faisalabad-V): Jafar Ali Hocha
  - MPA (PP-103 Faisalabad-VI): Noor Shahid Noor

Area
  - Tehsil: 1,351 km^{2} (522 sq mi)
- Elevation: 183 m (600 ft)

Population (2017 Census of Pakistan)
  - Tehsil: 702,733
  - Density: 520.2/km^{2} (1,347/sq mi)
  - Urban: 84,594
  - Rural: 618,139
- Time zone: UTC+5 (PST)
- ZIP code(s): 37150
- Calling code: 041
- No. of Union Councils: 28 (3 urban, 25 rural)

Tandlianwala (Punjabi, Urdu: تاندلیانوالہ) is a city and Tehsil in Punjab, Pakistan. It is located 40 km from the city of Faisalabad and 44 km from city of Okara. As a sub-division of Faisalabad District, it has a Tehsil Municipal Administration (TMA).=== Chak No. 543 GB (Thatha Nihal) === Chak No. 543 GB (also locally known as Thatha Nihal or Chak Nihal) is a prominent rural village settlement located in the Tandlianwala Tehsil of the Faisalabad District in Punjab, Pakistan.

== Administration and Demographics ==
The village falls under the administrative jurisdiction of the Kanjwani Markaz and is part of the Union Council framework of the region. Geographically, it relies on the Gugera Branch (GB) canal system for its extensive agricultural irrigation. The population is predominantly composed of agricultural tribes, with the Jat (specifically Grewal) clan holding a historically significant footprint in the area, earning the locality the secondary colloquial name "Jattan Wala."

== Notable Personalities and Welfare ==
- Muhammad Sharif Grewal (Late): A respected elder and historical figure of the local Grewal family network.
- Engr. Iftikhar Ali Grewal: An international electrical engineer, member of the Society of Engineers UAE, and son of the late Muhammad Sharif Grewal. Operating from the United Arab Emirates, he is recognized for sponsoring critical rural infrastructure and healthcare welfare programs in the village, including the establishment and funding of the 543GB Chak Nihal Ambulance Services.
- Babar Sharif Grewal: A prominent local community figure and brother of Engr. Iftikhar Ali Grewal, actively involved in regional development.

== History ==
The old name of the city was Tandla Mandi, meaning Tandla Market, during the colonization of west Punjab. Before the independence of Pakistan, the city was a food supply source for nearby villages. In 1987, it was given the status of "sub-tehsil". The town committee came into being during 1965. During 1966-1990, the town expanded rapidly because of the construction of a bridge over the Ravi River.

== Geography ==
Tandlianwala is located in the rolling plains of northeast Punjab, between longitude 73°13 East and latitude 30°03 North, with an elevation of 183 metres (600 ft) above sea level. The city covers an area of approximately 40 square kilometres (15 sq mi), while the tehsil area covers more than 1,280 square kilometres (490 sq mi). The Ravi River flows about 9 km in the east, and is the main source of irrigation, meeting the requirements of 90% of cultivated land.

There are no natural boundaries between Tandlianwala and the adjoining tehsils and districts. The city is bordered on the north by Faisalabad and on the east by Okara and Sahiwal. In the west and southwest is district Toba Tek Singh, with Samundri in the north and Jaranwala Tehsil in the east.

=== Geology ===
Tandlianwala is part of the alluvial plains, between the Himalayan foothills and the central core of the Indian subcontinent. The alluvial deposits are typically over a thousand feet thick. The scalloped interfluves are believed to have been formed during the Late Pleistocene period and feature flat-topped river terraces. These were later identified as old and young floodplains of the River Ravi on the Kamalia and Chenab Plains. The old floodplains consist of Holocene deposits from the River Ravi. There is also a small river passing through the center of the city.

The soil consists of young stratified silt loams or very fine sand loams which gave the subsoil a very weak structure with common kankers at only five feet. The course of the rivers within Tandlianwala Tehsil are winding and often subject to frequent alternations. In the rainy season, the currents are very strong. This leads to high floods in certain areas which last for a number of days. The Rakh Branch and Gogera Branch canals have changed the water levels in the district however the belt on the River Ravi has remained narrow. The river bed includes the river channels which have shifted the sand bars and low sandy levees leading to river erosion.

== Demographics ==
As per the Population Census Report of 1998, the town is spread over an area of 1284 Square Kilometers with a total population of 5,40,802 which has increased by 702,733 by 2017, indicating that the growth rate of the city is 3.37 percent per annum. Before the partition there was a majority of Sikh & Hindus in the city, most of whom then migrated to India. After the partition, the settlement of Muslim refugees from East Punjab and Haryana people increased, hailing from India. There are other two urban localities in Tandlianwala Municipal committee: Mamoon Kanjan and Kanjwani. The city has 28 Union Councils in total, with 3 Urban Councils and 25 Rural Union Councils.

There is a police force in the city which was established in 1905 by British settlers, covering an area of 680 sq. kilometres. There are four police stations: City Tandlianwala, Sadar Tandlianwala, Police Station Garh and Police Station Bahlak Thana.

=== Religion and ethnic groups ===
The majority religion is Islam, making up 98% of the city with small minorities of Christians (1.8%) and others (0.2%), mainly Sikhs and Ahmadis. The majority of Muslims belong to the Sunni, Hanafi, and Barelvi schools of thought with a minority of Shiites.

=== Climate ===
Tandlianwala has a hot desert climate (BWh) in the Köppen-Geiger classification. The climate of the area can have extreme temperatures, with a summer maximum temperature of 50 °C (122 °F) and a winter minimum temperature of −2 °C (28 °F). The mean maximum and minimum temperature in summer are 39 °C (102 °F) and 27 °C (81 °F) respectively. In winter it peaks at around 17 °C (63 °F) and drops to 6 °C (43 °F), on average.

The summer season starts in April and continues until October. May, June and July are the hottest months. The winter season starts from November and continues until March. December, January and February are the coldest months. The average yearly rainfall lies only at about 400 mm (16 in) and is highly seasonal with approximately half of the yearly rainfall in the two months of July and August.

Climate data for Tandlianwala Tehsil
Month	Jan	Feb	Mar	Apr	May	Jun	Jul	Aug	Sep	Oct	Nov	Dec	Year
Mean daily maximum °C (°F)	19.4 (66.9)	22.4 (72.3)	27.3 (81.1)	33.8 (92.8)	49.3 (120.7)	49.9 (121.8)	45.3 (113.5)	44.3 (111.7)	40 (104)	33.6 (92.5)	27.5 (81.5)	21.8 (71.2)	34.6 (94.2)
Daily mean °C (°F)	11.9 (53.4)	14.9 (58.8)	19.9 (67.8)	25.9 (78.6)	31.1 (88.0)	34 (93)	32.3 (90.1)	31.6 (88.9)	30.1 (86.2)	25.6 (78.1)	18.9 (66.0)	13.7 (56.7)	24.2 (75.5)
Mean daily minimum °C (°F)	4.4 (39.9)	7.4 (45.3)	12.6 (54.7)	18.1 (64.6)	23.3 (73.9)	27.4 (81.3)	27.4 (81.3)	26.9 (80.4)	24.2 (75.6)	17.6 (63.7)	10.4 (50.7)	5.7 (42.3)	17.1 (62.8)
Average precipitation mm (inches)	14 (0.6)	15 (0.6)	21 (0.8)	14 (0.6)	13 (0.5)	56 (2.2)	132 (5.2)	115 (4.5)	43 (1.7)	6 (0.2)	3 (0.1)	8 (0.3)	440 (17.3)
Source: Climate-Data.org, altitude: 183m

== Sports ==
Tandlianwala has a lot of sports like Cricket, Football and Volleyball. The boys of Tandlianwala commonly play cricket during the evening in various places, mostly at the grounds of MC High School and in Barlab Hockey Ground also known locally as the Doonga (D ground) Ground. Recently a new Cricket stadium is also construed at national standards.

There is also a hockey stadium under construction, which will be built to the national standard level.

== Agriculture ==
The city is well known because of the high quality of the Sugarcane produced there. It has two sugar mills and dozens of cotton factories, rice factories and flour mills. The city is traditionally known for pure Desi Ghee, though it is rare now.

The people of this city had an active part in the struggle for the independence of Pakistan (Freedom Movement). The city was originally developed around a grain market. Its police force was established in 1905 and prior to that only a police checkpost existed.

Politically, it is one of the most prominent Tehsils of Faisalabad District. Mian Manzoor Wattoo, a former chief minister of Punjab was elected from this constituency in 1993, while he lost in his home constituency.

== Economics ==
Tandlianwala is home to a major grain, whole corn & sugar market. Mahi Chowk is the main commercial market of the city. Other markets in the city include Ghala Mandi, Rail Bazar, Nehar Bazar, Naya Bazar, Anarkali Bazar, Quaid-e-Azam Road (Samundri Road), Faisalabad Road, etc.

Major banks and offices in Tandlianwala Tehsil:

1. National Bank of Pakistan
2. Bank of Punjab
3. Zarai Taraqiati Bank Limited
4. Habib Bank Limited
5. Allied Bank Limited
6. MCB Bank Limited
7. United Bank Limited
8. TCS Courier Limited

== Transport ==
- Tandliawala railway station

== Notable people ==
- Rai Ahmad Khan Kharal Shaheed from Jhamra; a freedom fighter
- Naz Khialvi, lyricist and radio host and presenter.
