= Malabari goat =

Indian breed of goat

Malabari
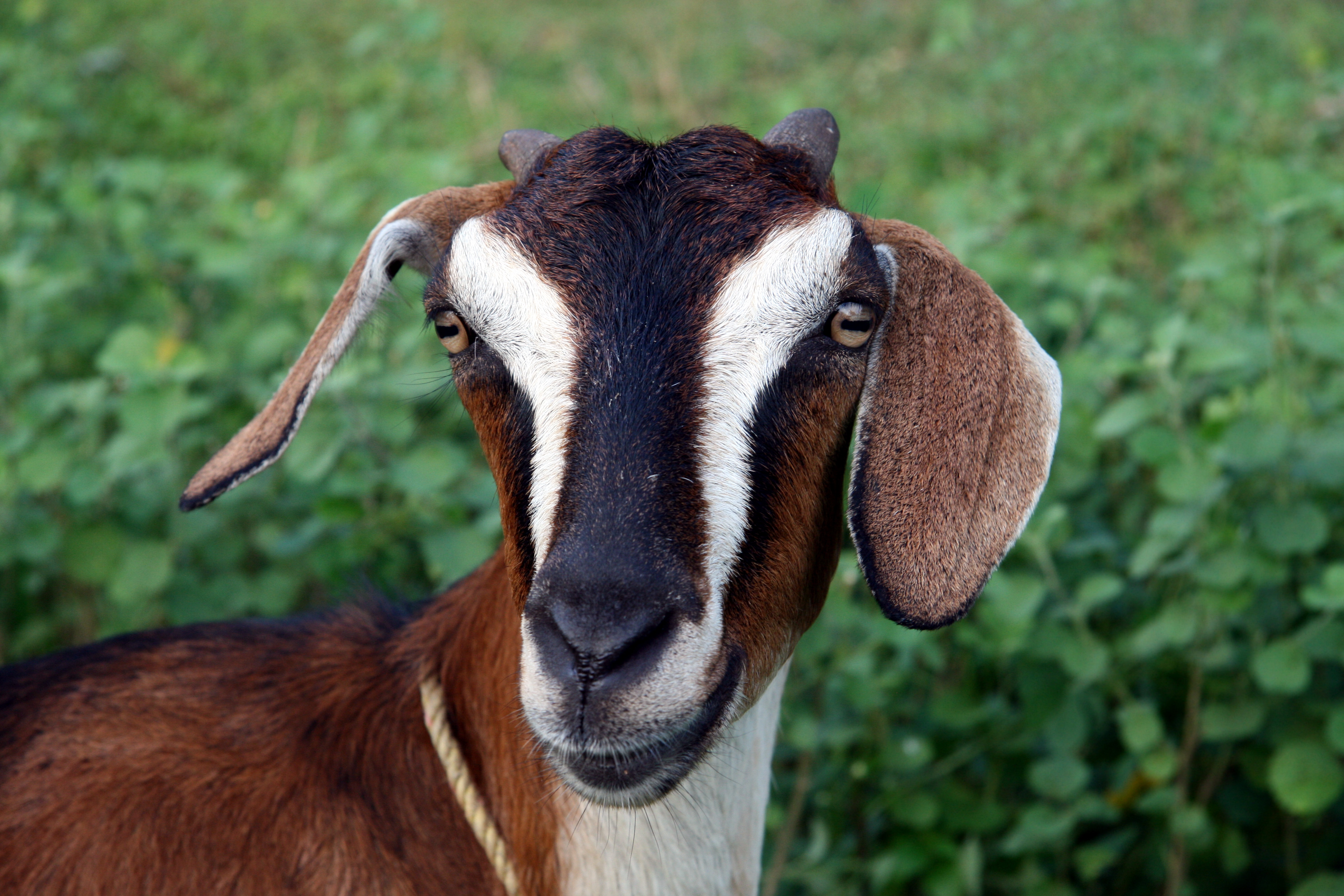
- Country of origin: India

Traits
- Weight: Male: 41.20kg; Female: 30.68kg
- Skin colour: white, brown and piebald
- Coat: white, brown and piebald
- Face colour: white, brown and piebald
- Goat; Capra aegagrus hircus

The Malabari or Tellicherry is an Indian breed of domestic goat. It is bred in the Malabar district of Kerala. They are bred mostly for meat, but it also produces milk. Females weigh an average of 30.68kg while males weigh 41.20kg, and their coats are white, black, or piebald. Although they are similar to the Beetal goat, Malabari goats weigh less, have shorter ears and legs, and have larger testicles. There was an effort to crossbreed the Malabari goats with Boer goats, but this practice is controversial.
