= Ali Gohar Khan =

Pakistani politician

Member of the National Assembly of Pakistan
- In office 29 October 2018 – 10 August 2023
- Constituency: NA-103 (Faisalabad-III)

Personal details
- Party: AP (2025-present)
- Other political affiliations: PMLN (2018-2025)
- Relations: Rajab Ali Khan Baloch (brother)

Ali Gohar Khan Baloch is a Pakistani politician who had been a member of the National Assembly of Pakistan from October 2018 till August 2023.

== Political career ==
Khan was elected to the National Assembly of Pakistan as a candidate of Pakistan Muslim League (N) (PML-N) from Constituency NA-103 (Faisalabad-III) in the 2018 Pakistani by-elections held on 14 October 2018.
