= Shrine of Baba Gurbaksh Das =

Christian shrine in Maraka, Pakistan

The Shrine of Baba Gurbaksh Das (Punjabi: بابا گربکش داس دی سمادھی Bābā Gurbaksh Dās di Samādhi), popularly known in Punjabi as Isaaiaan da mazaar (عیسائیاں دا مزار; meaning "The Shrine of the Christians") is a Christian shrine in Maraka in the Lahore District of Pakistan. It is a popular gathering place for Christians during festivals of the liturgical kalendar, such as Christmas and Easter; the Shrine of Baba Gurbaksh Das is a place of Christian pilgrimage. It holds the remains of Baba Mehar Das, as well as his son Baba Gurbakhsh Das; in addition Chinu Sai, Mai Derwishi and Baba Sohan Das are buried there. The shrine predates the partition of India in 1947, with the majority of the residents of Maraka being Mazhabi Sikhs prior to their conversion to Christianity. Its entrance is green in colour, with a Christian cross at the gate of the entrance. Its current caretaker is Pappu Masih.

== See also ==
- Sadhu Sundar Singh
