= PP-104 Faisalabad-VII =

Constituency of the Punjabi Provincial Legislature, Pakistan

- Constituency for the Provincial Assembly of Punjab
- Region: Samundri Tehsil (partly) of Faisalabad District

Current constituency
- Created from: PP-59 Faisalabad-IX (2002-2018); PP-105 Faisalabad-IX (2018-2023)

PP-104 Faisalabad-VII (پی پی-104، فیصل آباد-7) is a Constituency of Provincial Assembly of Punjab.

== General elections 2024 ==
Provincial election 2024: PP-104 Faisalabad-VII
Party	Candidate	Votes	%	±%
PML(N)	Arif Mehmood Gill	53,729	36.89	
Independent	Muhammad Farooq Arshad (Note: Filed nomination papers as PTI candidate but ECP allowed him to run as an Independent)	46,483	31.91	
PPP	Rana Muhammad Farooq Saeed Khan	17,721	12.17	
TLP	Ch Muhammad Madasar Iqbal	12,013	8.25	
Independent	Muhammad Arshad	8,648	5.94	
Others	Others (twenty four candidates)	7,070	4.84	
Turnout		151,130	50.55	
Total valid votes		145,664	96.38	
Rejected ballots		5,466	3.62	
Majority		7,246	4.98	
Registered electors		298,983		
hold				

== General elections 2018 ==
Provincial election 2018: PP-105 Faisalabad-IX
Party	Candidate	Votes	%	±%
PTI	Mumtaz Ahmed	50,267	37.15	
PML(N)	Kashif Raheem Khan	42,492	31.40	
Independent	Arif Mehmood Gill	28,130	20.79	
PPP	Rana Muhammad Farooq Saeed Khan	6,216	4.59	
TLI	Muzammal Hussain	3,038	2.25	
AAT	Munir Anmed	1,865	1.38	
Others	Others (ten candidates)	3,303	2.44	
Turnout		139,127	55.79	
Total valid votes		135,311	97.26	
Rejected ballots		3,816	2.74	
Majority		7,775	5.75	
Registered electors		249,377		

== General elections 2013 ==
Provincial election 2013: PP-59 Faisalabad-IX
Party	Candidate	Votes	%	±%
PML(N)	Arif Mahmood Gill	48,397	52.52	
PPP	Rana Muhammad Farooq Saeed Khan	12,376	13.43	
PTI	Haji Abdul Shakoor	12,135	13.17	
Independent	Choudhry Muhammad Mudassar Iqbal Kamboh	10,512	11.41	
PNML	Farkhanda Amjad Waraich	3,230	3.51	
JI	Pervez Ali Khan	1,528	1.66	
Others	Others (twenty eight candidates)	3,973	4.31	
Turnout		92,607	57.11	
Total valid votes		92,151	99.51	
Rejected ballots		456	0.49	
Majority		36,021	39.09	
Registered electors		162,142		

== General elections 2008 ==
Contesting candidates	Party affiliation	Votes polled

== See also ==
- PP-103 Faisalabad-VI
- PP-105 Faisalabad-VIII
