= Chaudhry Shehbaz Babar =

Pakistani politician

- چوہدری شہباز بابر

Member of the National Assembly of Pakistan
- Incumbent
- Assumed office 29 February 2024
- Constituency: NA-104 (Faisalabad-IV)
- In office 13 August 2018 – 10 August 2023
- Constituency: NA-104 (Faisalabad-IV)
- In office 1 June 2013 – 31 May 2018
- Constituency: NA-79 (Faisalabad)

Personal details
- Born: 18 February 1970 (age 56)
- Party: PMLN (2013-present)

Chaudhry Muhammad Shehbaz Babar Gujjar (Urdu: چوہدری محمد شہباز بابر گجر; born 18 February 1970) is a Pakistani politician who is a member of the National Assembly of Pakistan since 29 February 2024. Previously he had been a member of the National Assembly of Pakistan, from August 2018 till August 2023 and also from June 2013 to May 2018.

== Early life ==
He was born on 18 February 1973.

== Political career ==
He was elected to the National Assembly of Pakistan as a candidate of Pakistan Muslim League (N) (PML-N) from Constituency NA-79 (Faisalabad-V) in the 2013 Pakistani general election. He received 118,516 votes and defeated Khalid Abdullah Ghazi, a candidate of Pakistan Tehreek-e-Insaf (PTI).

Before being appointed as the Parliamentary Secretary for Information and Broadcasting in 2017, he served as a member of National Assembly Standing Committee for commerce, textile and health.

He was re-elected to the National Assembly as a candidate of PML-N from NA-104 (Samundari-IV) in the 2018 Pakistani general election. He received 98,509 votes and defeated Sardar Dildar Ahmed Cheema, a candidate of PTI.
