= Bilal Asghar Warraich =

Pakistani politician

Bilal Asghar Warraich Gojra

Member of the Provincial Assembly of the Punjab
- In office 22 October 2018 – 14 January 2023
- Constituency: PP-118 Toba Tek Singh-I
- In office 1 June 2013 – 31 May 2018
- Constituency: PP-84 (Toba Tek Singh-I)
- In office 9 April 2008 – 2013
- Constituency: PP-84 (Toba Tek Singh-I)

Personal details
- Born: 18 September 1977 (age 49) Gojra, Punjab, Pakistan
- Party: PML(Q) (2025-present)
- Other political affiliations: IPP (2023-2025); PTI (2023-2023)
- Relatives: Chaudhary Khalid Javed (brother)

Chaudhary Bilal Asghar Warraich is a Pakistani politician who had been a member of the Provincial Assembly of the Punjab from October 2018 till January 2023.

== Early life and education ==
He was born on 18 September 1977 in Gojra.

He is son of Ch Ali Asghar Warraich and younger brother of Ch Amjad Ali Warraich (Ex-MNA) and Ch Khalid Javed Warraich (MNA).

As per Punjab Assembly official website, he graduated in 1997 from University of the Punjab and has a degree of Bachelor of Arts.

== Political career ==
He was elected to the Provincial Assembly of the Punjab as a candidate of the Pakistan Muslim League (J) (PML-J) from PP-84 (Toba Tek Singh-I) in the 2002 Punjab provincial election. He received 24,662 votes and defeated Asad Zaman Cheema, a candidate of the Pakistan Muslim League (N) (PML-N).

He was re-elected to the Provincial Assembly of the Punjab as a candidate of the Pakistan Muslim League (Q) (PML-Q) from PP-84 (Toba Tek Singh-I) in the 2008 Punjab provincial election. He received 35,011 votes and defeated Usman Ali Cheema, a candidate of PML-N.

He was re-elected to the Provincial Assembly of the Punjab as a candidate of the Pakistan National Muslim League (PNML) from PP-84 (Toba Tek Singh-I) in the 2013 Punjab provincial election. He received 26,501 votes and defeated an independent candidate, Asad Zaman.

He was re-elected to the Provincial Assembly of the Punjab as an independent candidate from PP-118 (Toba Tek Singh-I) in a by-election held on 14 October 2018.

In May 2021, Warraich became the special coordinator to Chief Minister Punjab for Sports, Local Departments and Youth affairs.

On 5 January 2023, he joined the Pakistan Tehreek-e-Insaf (PTI) after a meeting with Imran Khan, the party chairman.
