= Constituency NA-79 =

Former constituency of the National Assembly of Pakistan

Constituency NA-79 (Faisalabad-V)
- Former constituency for the National Assembly of Pakistan
- Region: Faisalabad District

Former constituency
- Abolished: 2018

Constituency NA-79 (Faisalabad-V) (Urdu: این اے-۷۹، فیصل آباد-۵) was a constituency for the National Assembly of Pakistan from 2002-2018. Representing mainly the Samundri Tehsil, it has been merged into the new NA-104.

== Election 2002 ==
General elections were held on 10 Oct 2002. Muhammad Safdar Shaker of PML-Q won by 61,150 votes.

General election 2002: NA-79 Faisalabad-V
Party	Candidate	Votes	%	±%
PML(Q)	Muhammad Safdar Shakir	61,150	42.96	
PPP	Rana Muhammad Farooq Saeed Khan	56,773	39.89	
PML(N)	Ch. Safdar ur Rehman	23,448	16.47	
Others	Others (two candidates)	964	0.68	
Turnout		144,782	46.63	
Total valid votes		142,335	98.31	
Rejected ballots		2,447	1.69	
Majority		4,377	3.07	
Registered electors		310,492		

== Election 2008 ==
General elections were held on 18 Feb 2008. Rana Muhammad Farooq Saeed an independent candidate won by 58,563 votes.

General election 2008: NA-79 Faisalabad-V
Party	Candidate	Votes	%	±%
Independent	Rana Muhammad Farooq Saeed Khan	58,563	39.34	
PML(Q)	Muhammad Safdar Shakir	29,267	19.66	
PML(N)	Ch. Safdar ur Rehman	27,869	18.72	
PPP	Ch. Hammad Muhammad Khan	27,078	18.19	
Independent	Ch. Khalid Mehmood	5,747	3.86	
Others	Others (two candidates)	343	0.23	
Turnout		156,093	56.57	
Total valid votes		148,867	95.37	
Rejected ballots		7,226	4.63	
Majority		29,296	19.68	
Registered electors		275,953		

== Election 2013 ==
General elections were held on 11 May 2013. Chaudhary Muhammad Shehbaz Babar of PML-N won by 118,516 votes and became the member of National Assembly.

General election 2013: NA-79 Faisalabad-V
Party	Candidate	Votes	%	±%
PML(N)	Ch. Muhammad Shahbaz	118,516	61.55	
PTI	Khalid Abdullah Ghazi	22,420	11.64	
PPP	Rana Muhammad Farooq Saeed Khan	21,716	11.28	
PNML	Farkhanda Amjad Ali Warriach	11,549	6.00	
PML(Q)	Ch. Adil Saboor	4,660	2.42	
Independent	Ch. Safdar ur Rehman	2,596	1.35	
Others	Others (seventeen candidates)	11,106	5.76	
Turnout		199,885	59.51	
Total valid votes		192,563	96.34	
Rejected ballots		7,322	3.66	
Majority		96,096	49.91	
Registered electors		335,868		
