= Rashiana =

Chak 376 JB Nai Bassi
- Location within Pakistan
- Coordinates: 31.05°N 72.53°E
- Country: Pakistan
- Province: Punjab
- District: Toba Tek Singh
- Time zone: UTC+5 (PST)

Chak 376 JB Nai Bassi is a village of Toba Tek Singh District in the Punjab province of Pakistan. It is located at 31°5'10N 72°53'50E with an altitude of 174 metres (574 feet). Neighbouring settlements include 376 JB and 319 JB.
