= Samundri =

City in Punjab, Pakistan

- City
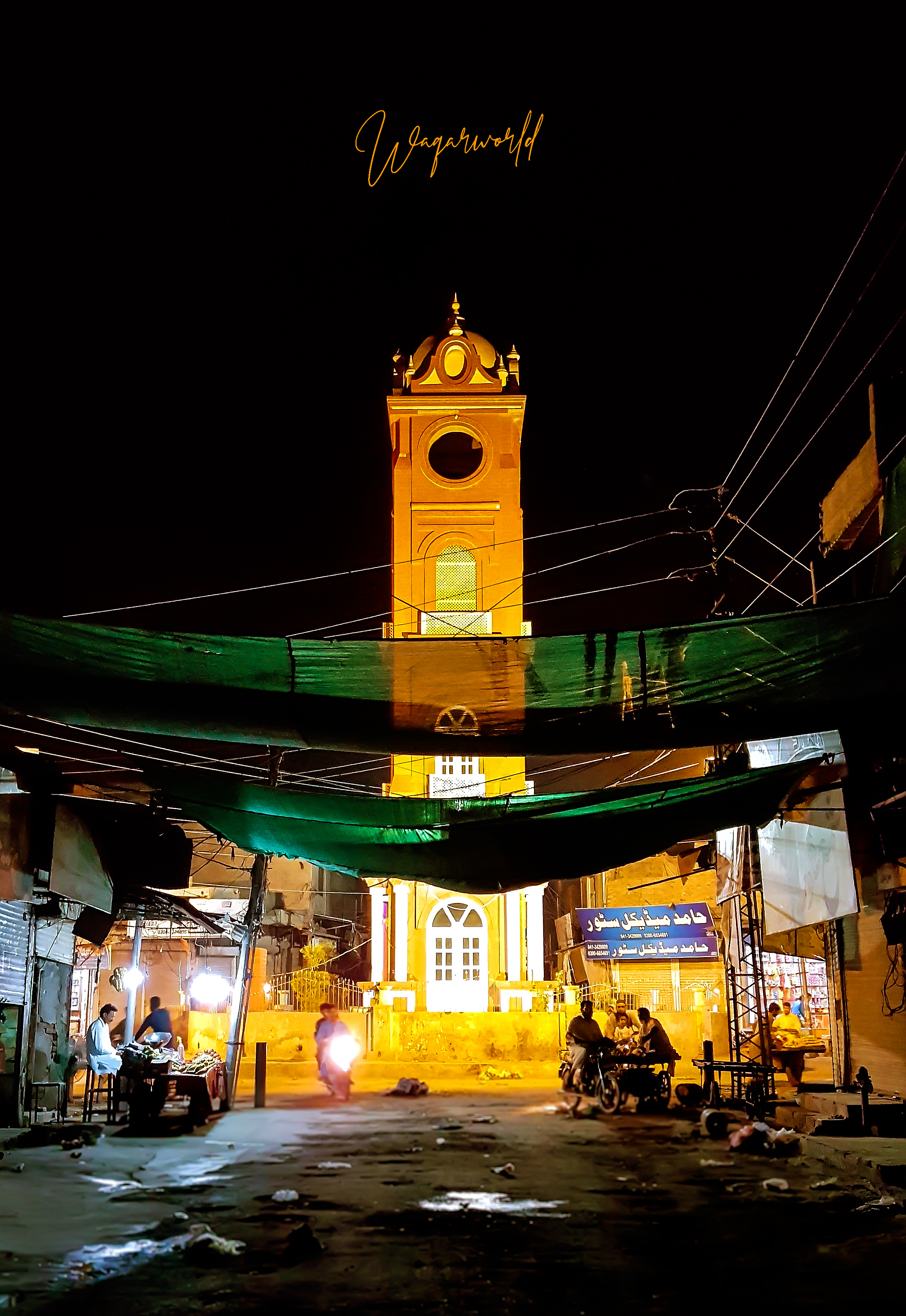
- Clock Tower, Samundri

- Location in Pakistan Samundri (Pakistan)
- Coordinates: 31°03′45″N 72°57′15″E
- Country: Pakistan
- Province: (Punjab, Pakistan) Punjab
- District: Faisalabad
- Tehsil: Samundri

Government
  - Type: Municipal Committee
  - Chairman: Vacant
  - Vice Chairman: Vacant

Population (2023 Census)
  - City: 186,371
  - Rank: 58th in Pakistan
- Time zone: UTC+5 (PKT)
- Postal code: 37300

Samundri (Urdu, Punjabi: سمندری) is a city and headquarters of Samundri Tehsil located in Faisalabad District of Punjab province, Pakistan.

It is the 58th most populous city of Pakistan, according to the 2023 census.

== History ==
=== Etymology ===
Samundri was on a major trade route during the reign of Sher Shah Suri. The present site of Samundri city was founded in 1887 as Chak No. 533 G.B. Later it was renamed as Seh Mundri because of three Hindu mandirs or temples in the area. The word Seh (سه) means Three in Persian and Mandir is a Sanskrit word for temple.

=== Modern ===
In 1887, there were three Hindu shrines in this area but now what remains, houses the Government Primary School No 4. Migration between India and Pakistan was continuous before the independence. By the 1930s Western Punjab was predominantly Muslim and supported the Muslim League and Pakistan Movement. After the independence in August 1947, the minority Hindus and Sikhs migrated to India while the Muslim refugees from Eastern Punjab in India settled in Western Punjab and across Pakistan. Today Samundri is known for its contributions to Pakistan's Kabaddi team providing dozens of big names especially from Chak 176 G.B and 478 G.B. It has many Gujjar, Rajput and Jat farmers who tend to be physically strong and larger in constitution than elsewhere in the region.

- Qaees Daud Khan (born 1994), The most famous Pakistani farmer in Samundri

== Geography ==
Samundri is located at 31°03'45"N 72°57'15"E (31.063, 72.954), at an altitude of 168 metres (429 ft), and is 45 km from Faisalabad, 66 km from Jhang, 30 km from Gojra, 46 km from Sahiwal and just 15 km from Tandlianwala. The upcoming Karachi-Lahore Motorway will pass through the neighborhood of Tandlianwala known as Samundari Interchange Km 1016 on Samundari-Tandlianwala Road. Then it will be easily accessible from Lahore and Multan. The Post Code of Samundari is 37300.

== Demographics ==
Population

Historical population
Year	Pop.	±% p.a.
1951	6,637	—
1961	9,515	+3.67%
1972	13,642	+3.33%
1981	30,849	+9.49%
1998	54,908	+3.45%
2017	156,991	+5.68%
2023	186,371	+2.90%

According to 2023 census, Samundri had a population of 186,371.

Languages

Languages of Samundri MC (2023 Census)
1. Punjabi (96.1%)
2. Urdu (3.40%)
3. Others (0.50%)

== Economy ==
Samundri is home to a major grain, whole corn & sugar market. Sugarcane and wheat are the major crops of the area, while corn is the most-traded good locally. Rice is also grown here but, due to water shortages, fewer farmers opt to grow it. Vegetables are grown on many hectares, fulfilling 50% of the demand.

The Anarkali Bazaar is the main commercial market of the city, and the Jinnah Market is the oldest. Other markets in the city include Jamat Ali Bazaar, Katchery Bazaar, Mandi Bazaar, Nehar Bazaar, Qasim Bazaar, Kashmiri Bazaar, Sunny Plaza and Chaki Bazaar.

Samundri is also known for its custom truck painting business.

Major Banks in Samundari:

1. National Bank of Pakistan
2. Zarai Taraqiati Bank Limited
3. Habib Bank Limited (2 Branches)
4. United Bank Limited
5. Allied Bank Limited
6. Muslim Commercial Bank Limited (2 Branches)
7. Bank Alfalah
8. Soneri Bank
9. Meezan Bank
10. Faysal Bank
11. Al-Barka Bank
12. Bank Al-Habib

== Major educational institutions ==
Samundri has a number of educational institutions, including government and private schools, colleges, professional institutions and private coaching academies. Major educational institutions in the city include:

- Government Graduate College Samundari
- Government College of Commerce Samundari
- Government Graduate College for Women, Samundari
- Punjab College Samundari
- KIPS College Samundari
- Concordia College Samundari
- The Spirit School Samundari Campus
- The Educators – Samundari Campus
- Allied School – Saahil Campus, Samundari
- Ikhlas International School – City Campus, Samundari
- The SAVVY School – Samundari Campus
- SAATH Academy Samundari ( Best Academy in Samundri )
- GC Academy Samundari
- Brilliant Science Academy
- Ideal Science Academy Samundari

== Notable residents ==
- Ramish Amin (1999 - Till Date) Supporter of Democracy & rule of law in Pakistan
- Rao Kashif Raheem Khan (born 1970), Pakistani politician
- Prithviraj Kapoor, Indian actor
