= Samundri Tehsil =

Tehsil municipal administration area of Faisalabad, Pakistan

Samundri Tehsil تحصیل سمندری
- Tehsil
- Country: Pakistan
- Region: Punjab
- District: Faisalabad
- Capital: Samundri

Population (2023 Census of Pakistan)
  - Tehsil: 729,672
  - Urban: 186,371
  - Rural: 543,301
- Time zone: UTC+5 (PST)
- Postal code: 37300

Samundri Tehsil (Urdu/Punjabi: تحصیل سمندری) is an administrative subdivision of Faisalabad District in the Punjab province of Pakistan. Samundri is the city and headquarters of the tehsil. Samundri Tehsil farms are irrigated by Gugera Branch Canal and Burala Branch Canal.

Chak 203 GB Ferozpur is the biggest village of the tehsil by area and population.

All villages of the tehsil carry the suffix GB with their Chak numbers, and the name of village usually follows it for example, Chak 141 GB and Chak 228 GB. The village numbers are designated by the water pump number the village is built upon. It has 14 villages that were made by the British government. Sugar cane is the major cash crop. wheat, cotton and vegetables are grown there. Samundri is one of the oldest tehsils of Pakistan.

== History ==
The name Samundri comes from the presence of three Hindu temples. The name Seh-Mandri derives from the words seh (three) and mandr (temple). Thus, seh-mandri means a small city with three temples. The name later evolved into Samundri.

The city has many buildings constructed in the 1930s or before. Until 1904, during British rule, Samundri was headquarters of a tehsil in Jhang district . Samundri Tehsil was transferred to Lyallpur District when the latter was created. At that time, it had an area of 339,029 hectares (837,759 acres).

The population in 1906 was 266,277, spread across 495 villages, including Samundri (population, 765), the headquarters. The land revenue and cesses in 1905-6 amounted to 600,000 to 700,000. The tehsil consists of a level plain, sloping gently towards the Ravi and the Deg on the south, and is now irrigated by the Chenab Canal, except for a few scattered plots in the Ravi lowlands which depend on wells. The soil is generally of fine quality. The boundaries of the tehsil were somewhat modified at the time of the formation of the New District.

By the 1900s, Western Punjab was predominantly Muslim, supporting the Muslim League and the Pakistan Movement. Migration between India and Pakistan was continuous before the Partition of India. After the Partition of India in August 1947, the Hindus and Sikhs migrated to India Amloh town of Punjab, while Muslims from India settled in Western Punjab and across Pakistan.

In 1947, when partition took place, many people from the village Nva Chakk 372 moved to Patiala District, Amloh, India (now Fatehgarh Sahib or Sirhind).

The tehsil’s area was reduced to 89,842 hectares (222,004 acres) in 1994.

== Demographics ==
The population is predominantly Punjabi Muslims speaking Punjabi and Urdu. The main clans in Samundri Tehsil are Rajput, Gujjar and Jutt, accounting for some 80% of the total. Arain, Butts, Mugals, Ansaris, Shaikh and Quraishis are also present. The population is more than 99% Muslim with the remainder made up of Christians and Hindus.

== Problems ==
The tehsil faces extreme shortage of canal water for irrigated agriculture. The shortage is a major reason for the poor economic conditions in the villages. Rainfall is rare or uneven. Lack of potable water causes poor health.

== Facilities ==
Ten public and private hospitals are present, but child specialists and cardiologists are often not available.

== Notables ==
- Mohammad Zakaullah, retired four-star rank admiral in the Pakistan Navy, was the 15th Chief of Naval Staff of the Pakistan Navy.
- Muhammad Zain Ashiq, graduate of University of Agriculture Faisalabad is the first Pakistani selected for United Nation Technology Bank Program of engineering, This program is the joint collaboration of World Eco-Design Conference and Zhejiang University.
