= Faisalabad District =

District in Punjab, Pakistan

Faisalabad District ضلع فیصل آباد Lyallpur District
- District
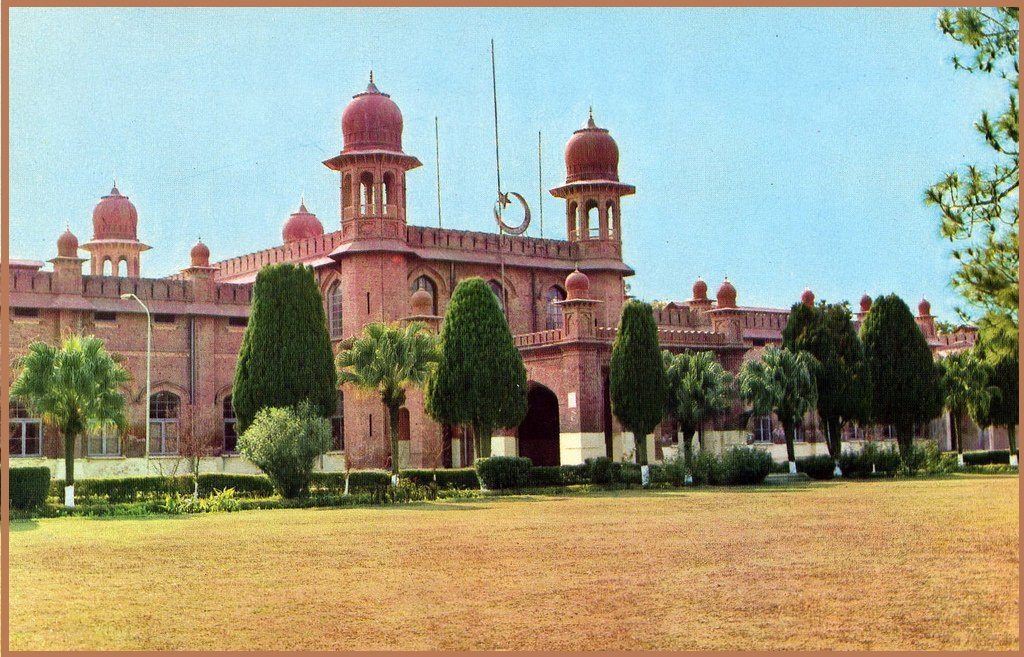
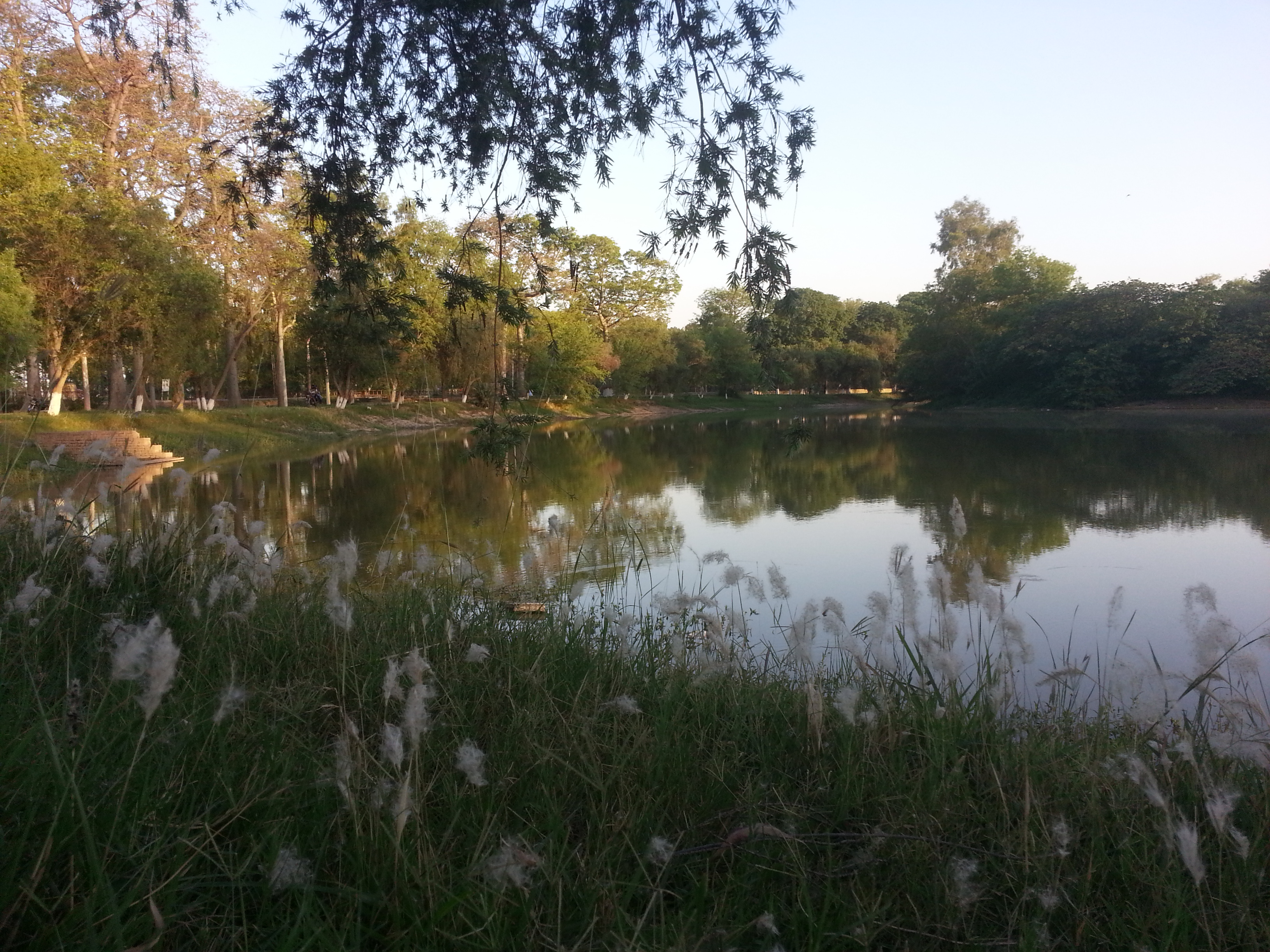
- Top: University of Agriculture, Faisalabad; Bottom: Gat Wala Lake

- Faisalabad District highlighted within Punjab Province
- Coordinates: 31°25′05.10″N 73°04′39.27″E
- Country: Pakistan
- Province: Punjab
- Division: Faisalabad
- Headquarters: Faisalabad
- Number of Tehsils: 6

Government
  - Type: District Administration
  - Deputy Commissioner: Captain (R) Nadeem Nasir
  - District Police Officer: Kamran Adil
  - District Health Officer: N/A

Area
  - District: 5,857 km^{2} (2,261 sq mi)

Population (2023)
  - District: 9,075,819
  - Density: 1,550/km^{2} (4,013/sq mi)
  - Urban: 4,392,979 (48.40%)
  - Rural: 4,682,840 (51.60%)

Literacy
  - Literacy rate: Total: (73.41%); Male: (77.34%); Female: (69.11%)
- Time zone: UTC+5 (PST)
- Area code: 041
- Languages: Punjabi, Urdu
- Website: faisalabad.punjab.gov.pk

Faisalabad District (Lyallpur District until 1979) (Punjabi and Urdu: ضلع فیصل آباد) is one of the districts of Punjab, Pakistan. According to the 2023 census of Pakistan it had a population of 9,075,819, of which 3,691,999 were in Faisalabad City. It is the third largest city of Pakistan after Karachi and Lahore.

After the independence of Pakistan in 1947, the Muslim refugees from Eastern Punjab and Haryana settled in the Faisalabad District. It initially lacked industry, hospitals and universities. Since independence, there has been industrial growth, and the city's population is continually growing. Notable industry in the district include but not limited to Textile (spinning, weaving, printing, dying, stitching), Chemicals (acids, caustics, industrial gases, potash, chlorides, etc.), consumer goods (soaps, vegetable oil, detergents), Engineering (light electrical equipment, engineering goods), Metals & Metallurgy (steels, alloys) and Power (power equipment, power production).

Initially a part of Jhang District, it gained the status of a separate district in 1904. In 1982 Toba Tek Singh District (until then a Tehsil of Faisalabad District) was created as a separate district from Faisalabad. As of 2006, it is a City-District consisting of the city of Faisalabad and its surrounding areas.

== Administrative divisions ==
Faisalabad District is part of Faisalabad Division. In 2005 Faisalabad was reorganized as a City-District. It comprises six Tehsils.

Tehsil	Area (km^{2})	Pop. (2023)	Density (ppl/km^{2}) (2023)	Literacy rate (2023)	Union Councils
Chak Jhumra	654	385,169	588.94	70.56%	...
Faisalabad City	168	3,691,999	21,976.18	81.59%	...
Faisalabad Sadar	1,186	1,742,958	1,469.61	71.25%	...
Jaranwala	1,811	1,731,148	955.91	66.32%	...
Samundri	754	729,672	967.73	75.99%	...
Tandlianwala	1,284	794,873	619.06	52.83%	...

== Demographics ==
=== Population ===
Historical population
Year	Pop.	±% p.a.
1951	1,548,689	—
1961	1,990,297	+2.54%
1972	3,163,756	+4.30%
1981	3,561,909	+1.33%
1998	5,429,547	+2.51%
2017	7,882,444	+1.98%
2023	9,075,819	+2.38%

As of the 2023 census, Faisalabad district had 1,382,773 households and a population of 9,075,819 which is roughly equal to the population of Los Angeles County, California, USA. The district had a sex ratio of 108.92 males to 100 females and a literacy rate of 73.41%: 77.34% for males and 69.11% for females. 2,200,114 (24.27% of the surveyed population) were under 10 years of age. 4,392,979 (48.40%) lived in urban areas.

Total Population according to censuses
Administrative Unit	1981	1998	2017	2023
Chak Jhumra	202,078	253,806	332,461	385,169
Faisalabad City	1,181,562	2,140,346	3,238,841	3,691,999
Faisalabad Sadar	666,023	924,110	1,465,411	1,742,958
Jaranwala	747,890	1,054,698	1,492,276	1,731,148
Samundri	378,302	515,785	643,068	729,672
Tandlianwala	386,054	540,802	702,733	794,873
Faisalabad District	3,561,909	5,429,547	7,874,790	9,075,819

=== Religion ===
Religion in Faisalabad district (2023)
Religion	Percent
Islam	96.48%
Christianity	3.40%
Other or not stated	0.12%

Islam is followed by majority of the district's population. Christians form 3.4% of population. Hindus formed a small minority population of 2,150 people. The Sita Ram temple is a Hindu temple near Jhang Bazaar region in the district. However the temple is currently neglected and deteriorated. The Hindu community has been demanding the reopening of the shrine.

Religion in contemporary Faisalabad District
Religious group	1941		2017		2023	
Religious group	Pop.	%	Pop.	%	Pop.	%
Islam	606,374	60.64%	7,606,012	96.49%	8,746,155	96.48%
Sikhism	209,504	20.95%	—N/a	—N/a	243	~0%
Hinduism (Note: 1931-1941: Including Ad-Dharmis)	148,484	14.85%	598	0.01%	2,150	0.02%
Christianity	35,341	3.53%	264,677	3.36%	308,580	3.4%
Ahmadiyya	—N/a	—N/a	10,959	0.14%	7,630	0.08%
Others	197	0.02%	198	0%	545	0.01%
Total Population	999,900	100%	7,882,444	100%	9,065,306	100%
Note: 1941 census data is for Lyallpur, Samundri and Jaranwala tehsils of erstwhile Lyallpur district, which roughly corresponds to contemporary Faisalabad district. District and tehsil borders have changed since 1941.

Religious groups in Faisalabad District (British Punjab province era)
Religious group	1901		1911		1921		1931		1941	
Religious group	Pop.	%	Pop.	%	Pop.	%	Pop.	%	Pop.	%
Islam	484,657	61.2%	524,288	61.13%	594,917	60.74%	720,996	62.62%	877,518	62.85%
Hinduism	210,459	26.58%	154,603	18.03%	181,488	18.53%	173,344	15.06%	204,059	14.61%
Sikhism	88,049	11.12%	146,670	17.1%	160,821	16.42%	211,391	18.36%	262,737	18.82%
Christianity	8,672	1.1%	32,023	3.73%	42,004	4.29%	45,518	3.95%	51,948	3.72%
Jainism	23	0%	125	0.01%	231	0.02%	95	0.01%	35	0%
Zoroastrianism	1	0%	2	0%	2	0%	7	0%	6	0%
Buddhism	0	0%	0	0%	0	0%	0	0%	2	0%
Judaism	0	0%	0	0%	0	0%	0	0%	0	0%
Others	0	0%	0	0%	0	0%	0	0%	0	0%
Total population	791,861	100%	857,711	100%	979,463	100%	1,151,351	100%	1,396,305	100%
Note1: British Punjab province era district borders are not an exact match in the present-day due to various bifurcations to district borders — which since created new districts — throughout the historic Punjab Province region during the post-independence era that have taken into account population increases. Note2: District formerly inscribed as the Chenab Colony on the 1901 census, later renamed to Lyallpur District, created between Jhang District, Gujranwala District, Lahore District, Montgomery District, and Multan District to account for the large population increase in the region, primarily due to the Chenab Canal Colony. Note3: Formerly known as Lyallpur District, prior to district renaming in 1979.

Religion in the Tehsils of Faisalabad District (1921)
Tehsil	Islam		Hinduism		Sikhism		Christianity		Jainism		Others (Note: Including Buddhism, Zoroastrianism, Judaism, Tribals, others, or not stated)		Total	
Tehsil	Pop.	%	Pop.	%	Pop.	%	Pop.	%	Pop.	%	Pop.	%	Pop.	%
Lyallpur Tehsil	187,702	54.43%	73,359	21.27%	65,389	18.96%	18,347	5.32%	53	0.02%	2	0%	344,852	100%
Samundri Tehsil	155,680	69.25%	35,477	15.78%	26,531	11.8%	7,017	3.12%	101	0.04%	0	0%	224,806	100%
Toba Tek Singh Tehsil	148,015	63.68%	38,853	16.72%	31,832	13.7%	13,680	5.89%	46	0.02%	0	0%	232,426	100%
Jaranwala Tehsil	103,520	58.36%	33,799	19.05%	37,069	20.9%	2,960	1.67%	31	0.02%	0	0%	177,379	100%
Note: British Punjab province era tehsil borders are not an exact match in the present-day due to various bifurcations to tehsil borders — which since created new tehsils — throughout the historic Punjab Province region during the post-independence era that have taken into account population increases.

Religion in the Tehsils of Faisalabad District (1941)
Tehsil	Islam		Hinduism		Sikhism		Christianity		Jainism		Others (Note: Including Anglo-Indian Christians, British Christians, Buddhism, Zoroastrianism, Judaism, Tribals, others, or not stated)		Total	
Tehsil	Pop.	%	Pop.	%	Pop.	%	Pop.	%	Pop.	%	Pop.	%	Pop.	%
Lyallpur Tehsil	221,333	54.52%	73,400	18.08%	89,629	22.08%	21,500	5.3%	34	0.01%	77	0.02%	405,973	100%
Samundri Tehsil	217,359	72.32%	33,860	11.27%	40,690	13.54%	8,629	2.87%	0	0%	6	0%	300,544	100%
Toba Tek Singh Tehsil	271,144	68.4%	55,575	14.02%	53,233	13.43%	16,353	4.13%	1	0%	99	0.02%	396,405	100%
Jaranwala Tehsil	167,682	57.15%	41,224	14.05%	79,185	26.99%	5,212	1.78%	0	0%	80	0.03%	293,383	100%
Note1: British Punjab province era tehsil borders are not an exact match in the present-day due to various bifurcations to tehsil borders — which since created new tehsils — throughout the historic Punjab Province region during the post-independence era that have taken into account population increases. Note2: Tehsil religious breakdown figures for Christianity only includes local Christians, labeled as "Indian Christians" on census. Does not include Anglo-Indian Christians or British Christians, who were classified under "Other" category.

=== Language ===
Languages of Faisalabad district (2023)
1. Punjabi (94.1%)
2. Urdu (4.49%)
3. Pashto (0.64%)
4. Others (0.74%)

At the time of the 2023 census, 94.13% of the population spoke Punjabi, 4.49% Urdu, and 0.64% Pashto as their first language.

== Electricity supplier ==
The electricity supply in Faisalabad District is managed by the Faisalabad Electric Supply Company.

== Education ==
- Government College University Faisalabad
- University of Agriculture, Faisalabad

== Notable people ==
- Abid Sher Ali, Pakistan Muslim League (N) worker born in Faisalabad.
- Om P. Bahl, an Indian-American molecular biologist, academic and was known for his studies on Human chorionic gonadotropin, popularly known as the pregnancy hormone
- Mian Abdul Bari, Pakistan Movement activist and politician.
- Talal Chuadhry, Pakistan Muslim League (N) worker born in Faisalabad.
- Lal Chand Yamla Jatt, a noted Indian Punjabi-language folk singer, considered by many to have laid the foundation of contemporary Punjabi music in India
- Nusrat Fateh Ali Khan, a famous singer and musician, born in Faisalabad.
- Rana Sanaullah, former PPP and current Pakistan Muslim League (N) worker born in Faisalabad.
- Arjan Singh, a senior air officer and the first and only officer of the Indian Air Force (IAF) to be promoted to five-star rank as Marshal of the Indian Air Force
- Bhagat Singh, a famous Indian revolutionary and freedom fighter
- Harkishan Singh, a well recognized pharmaceutical academic, medicinal chemistry researcher and science historian

== See also ==
- Faisalabad Division
- Faisalabad Arts Council
- Khanewal–Wazirabad Branch Line
- Gatwala Wildlife Park
- Iqbal Stadium
