= List of places in Faisalabad =

Faisal Masjid Faisalabad

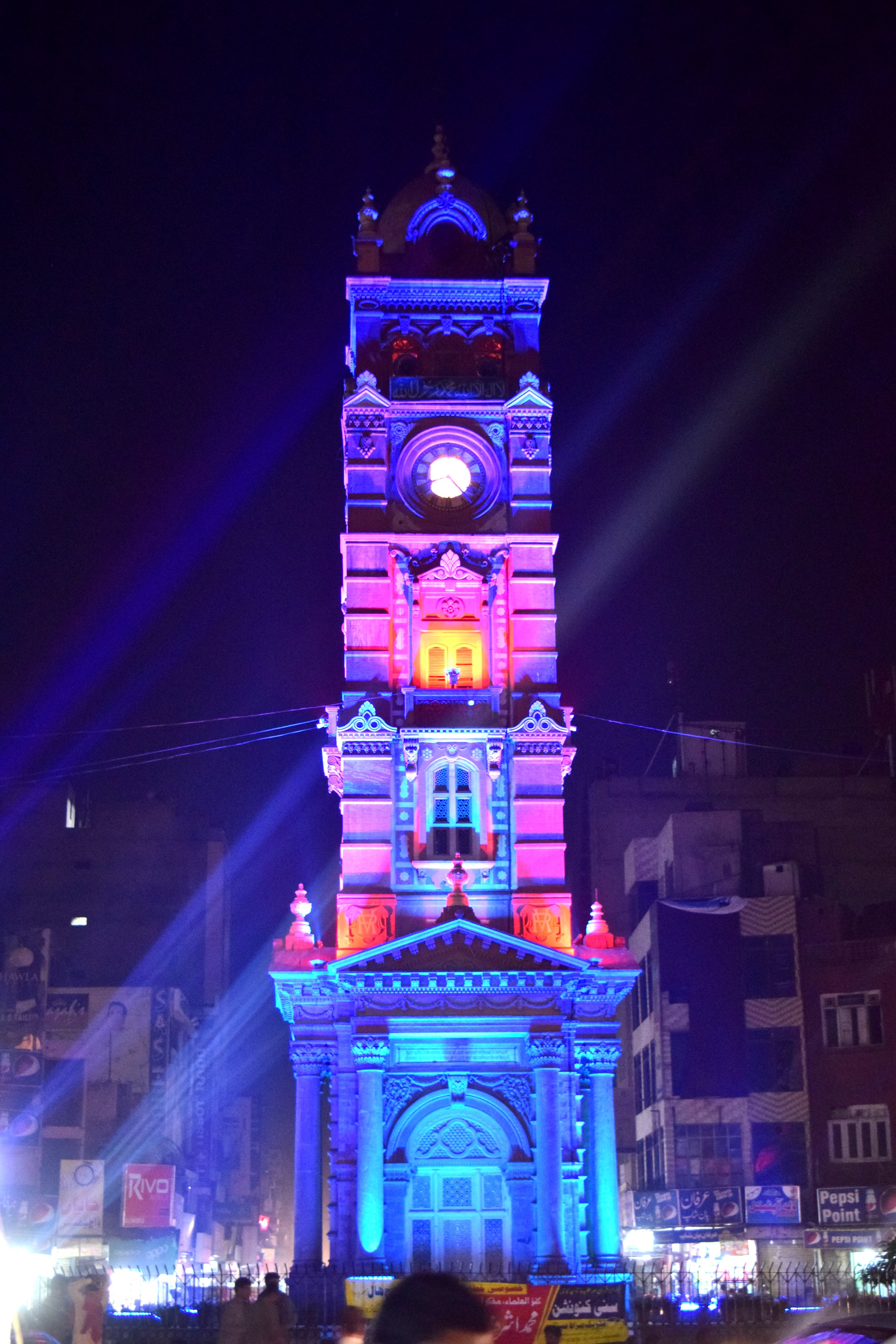
The illuminated Clock Tower of Faisalabad

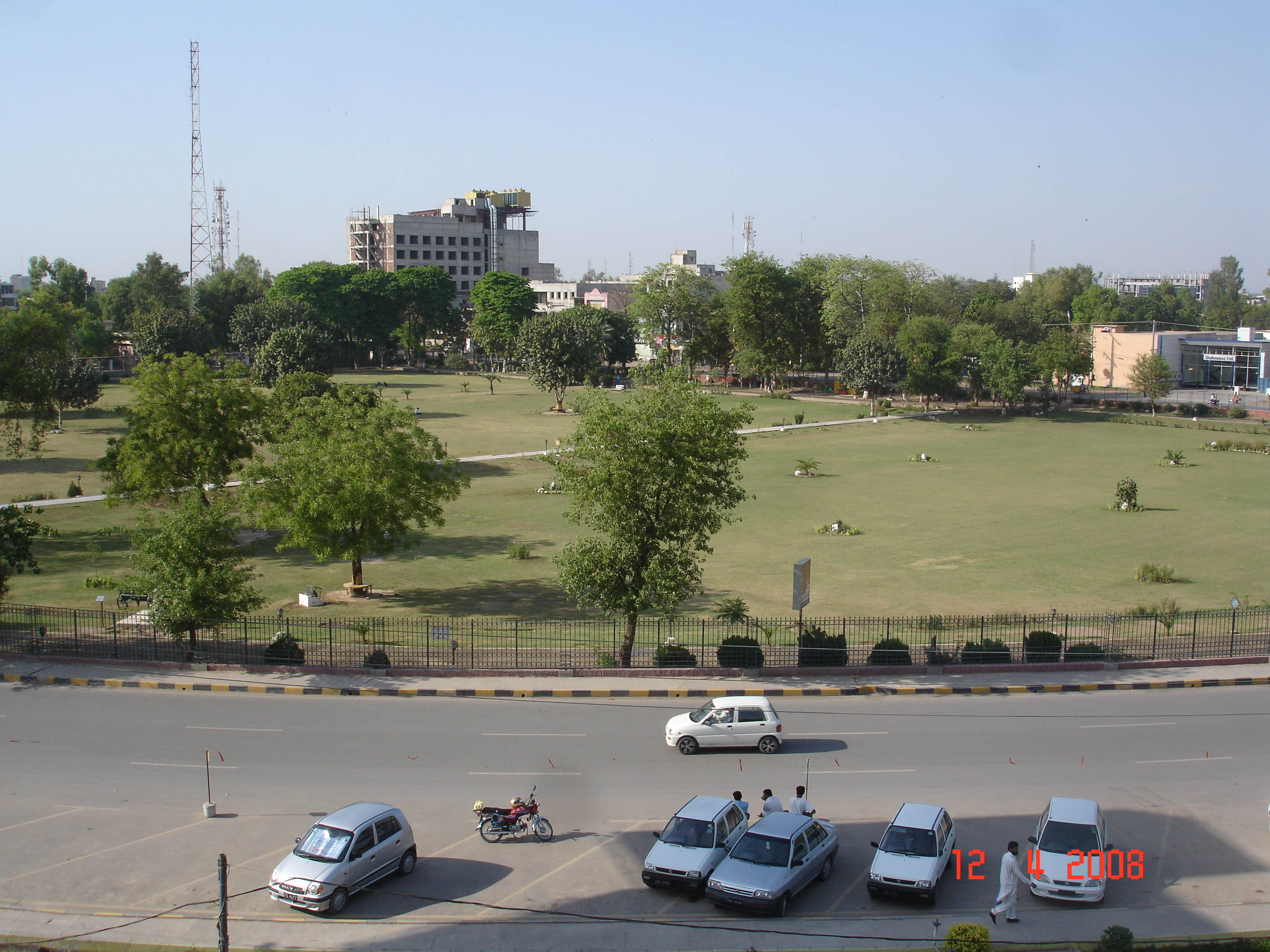
D Ground Park

This is a list of all the notable places in the city of Faisalabad, the third most populous city in Pakistan. Faisalabad is also called the Manchester of Pakistan due its textile importance in Pakistan. The city is known for its colonial heritage and its roots tracing back to the rule of the British Empire.

== City District ==
=== Towns ===
Since 2005, the administration of Faisalabad has been divided into eight tehsil municipal administration areas (TMAs):

- Lyallpur Town
- Madina Town
- Jinnah Town
- Iqbal town
- Chak Jhumra Town
- Jaranwala Town
- Samundri Town
- Tandlianwala Town

=== Neighbourhoods ===
- Amin Town, residential neighborhood on the Faisalabad Canal Expressway
- Batala Colony, residential neighborhood
- Civil Lines, Civil Lines neighborhood built during the British Raj for British civilian officers
- D Ground, commercial area
- Gatwala, commercial area
- Ghulam Muhammad Abad, residential neighborhood
- Gobind Pura, residential neighborhood
- Gokhowal, residential neighborhood
- Gulbahar Colony, residential neighborhood in southern Faisalabad
- Gulberg, residential and commercial area
- Gulistan Colony, residential neighborhood
- Madan Pura, residential neighborhood on the Aziz Bhatti Expressway
- Manawala, residential neighborhood
- Mansoorabad, residential neighborhood
- Millat Town, residential neighborhood
- Motorway City, residential neighborhood
- Nishatabad, residential neighborhood

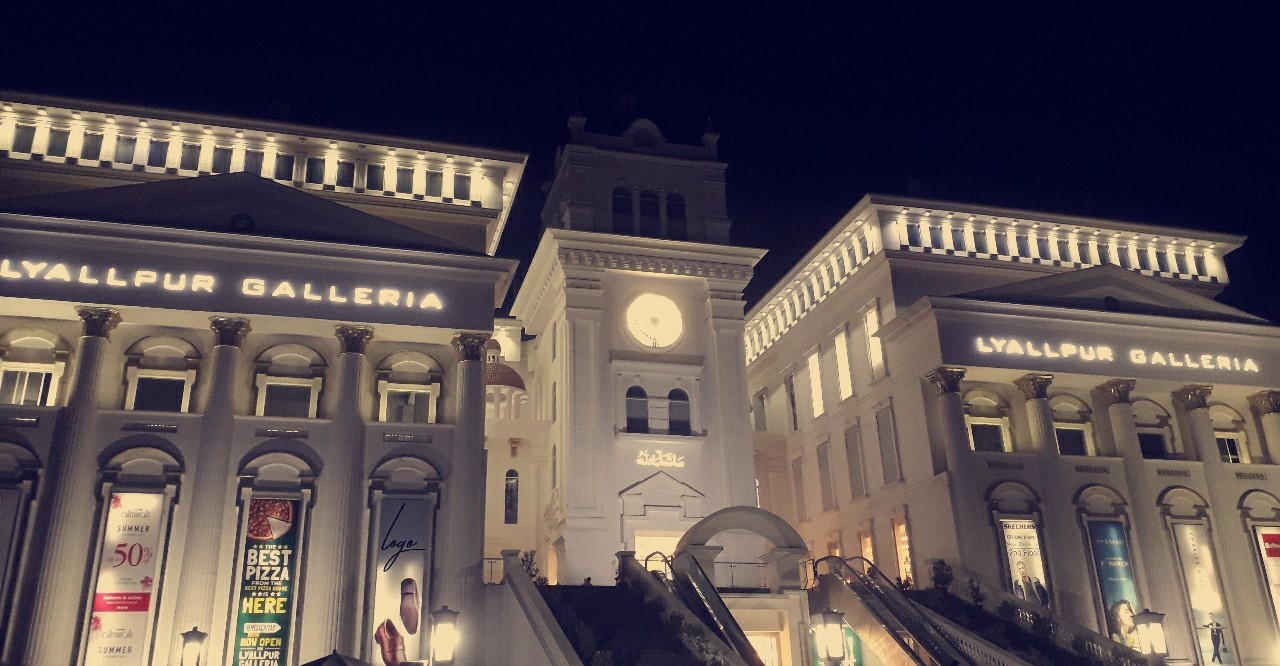
Lyallpur Galleria

== Points of interest ==
=== Colonial architecture ===
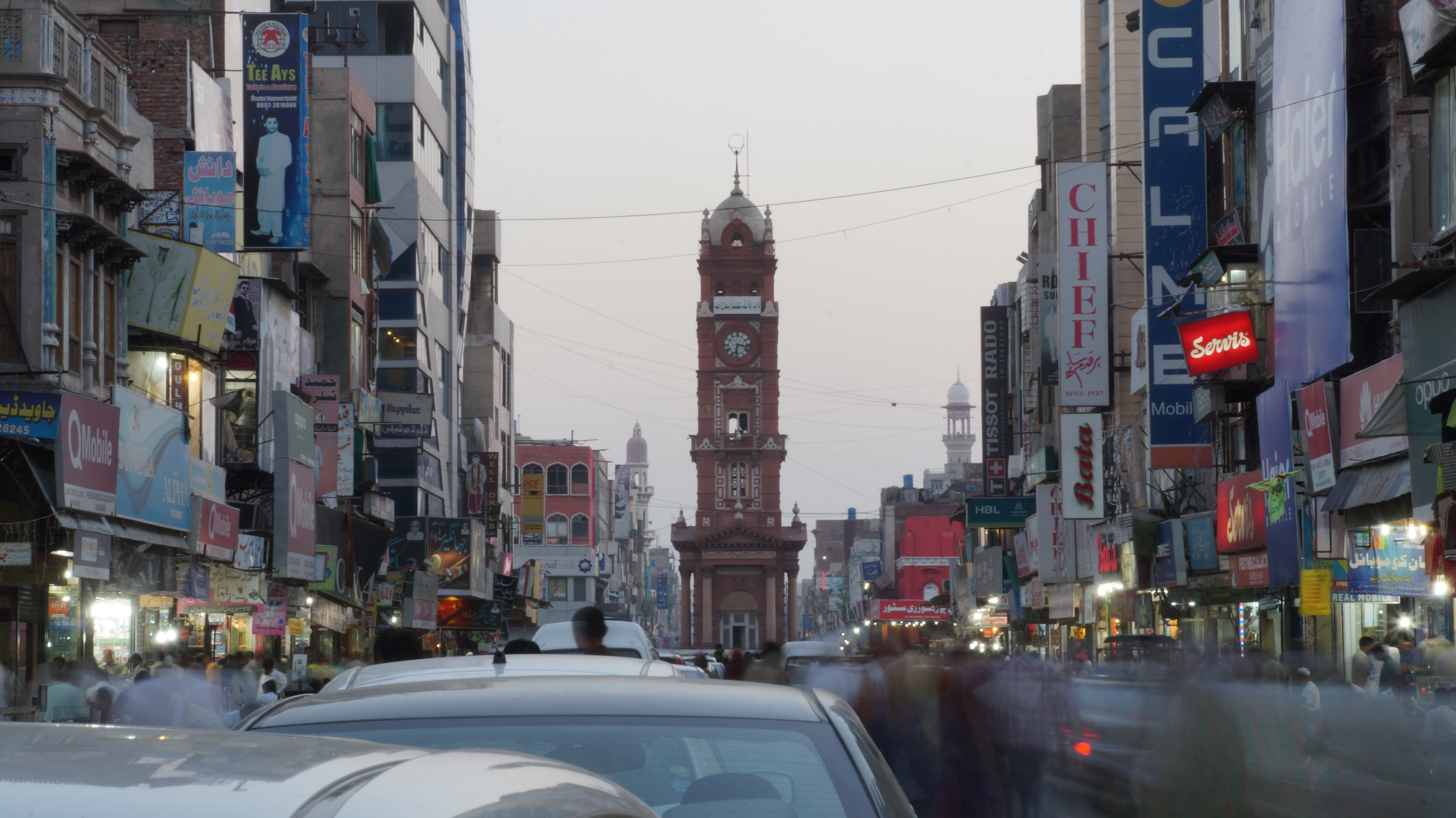
Clock Tower

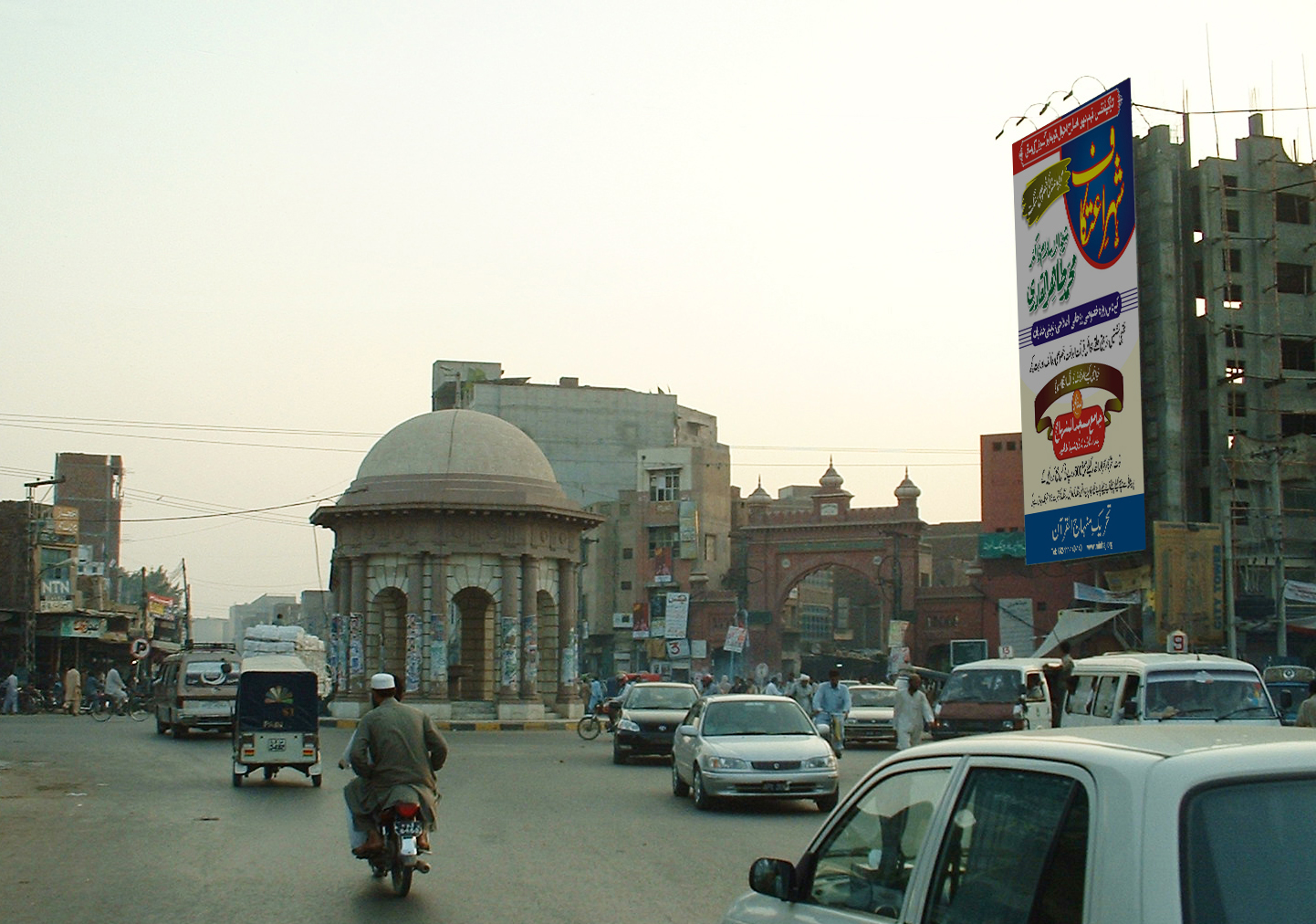
Gumti & Qaisery Gate

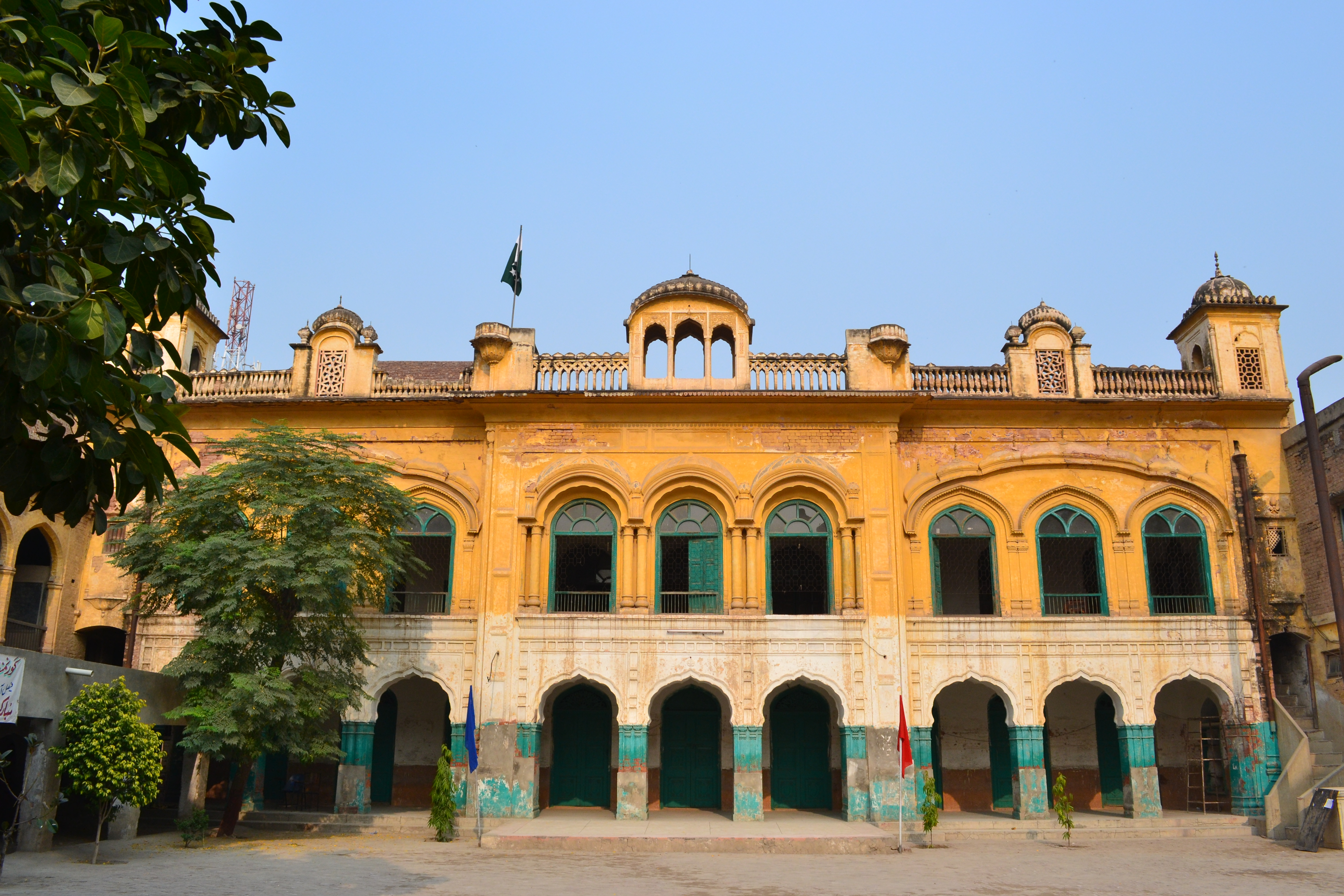
Lyallpur Gurdwara

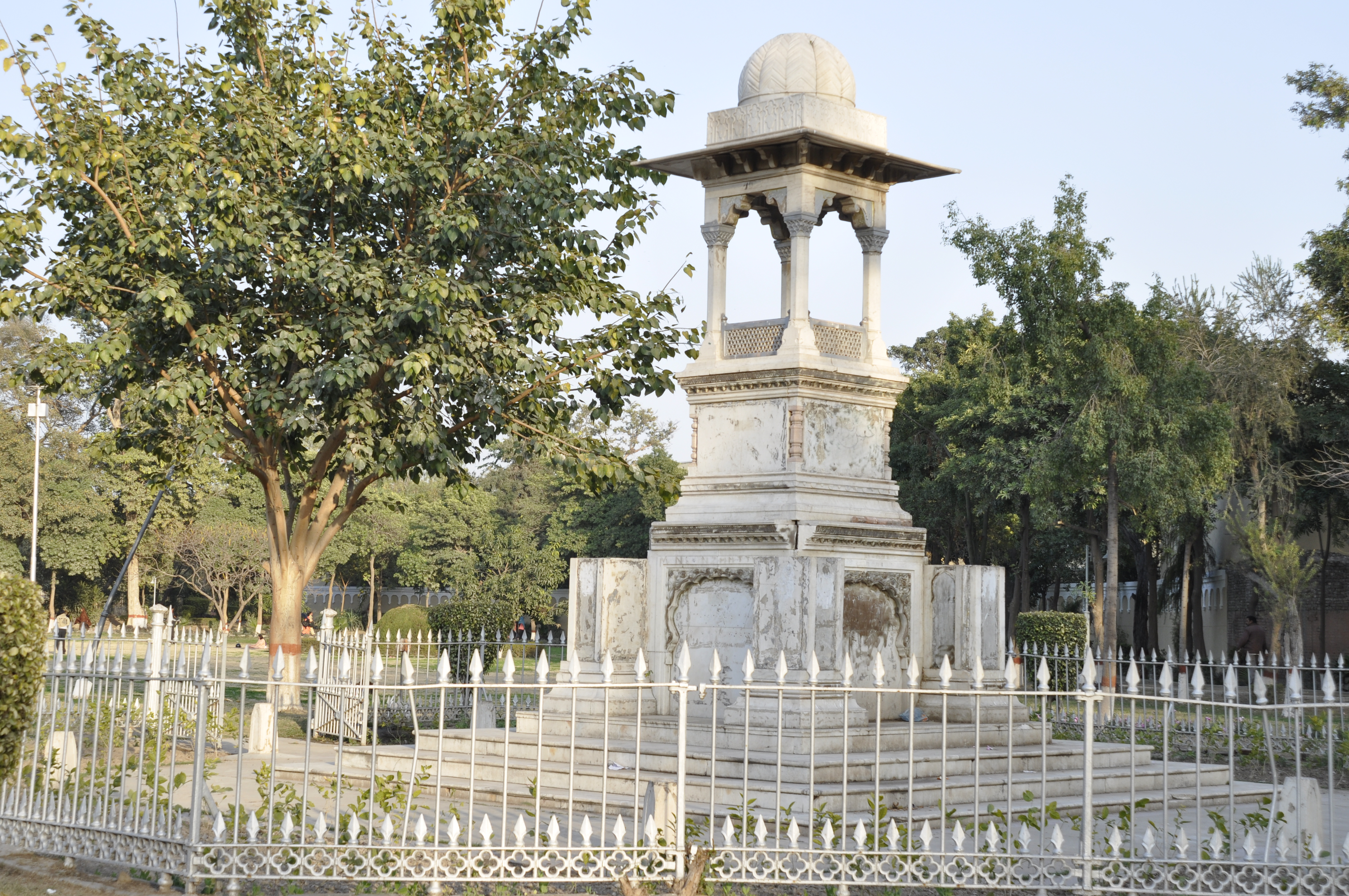
Sir James Lyall Monument

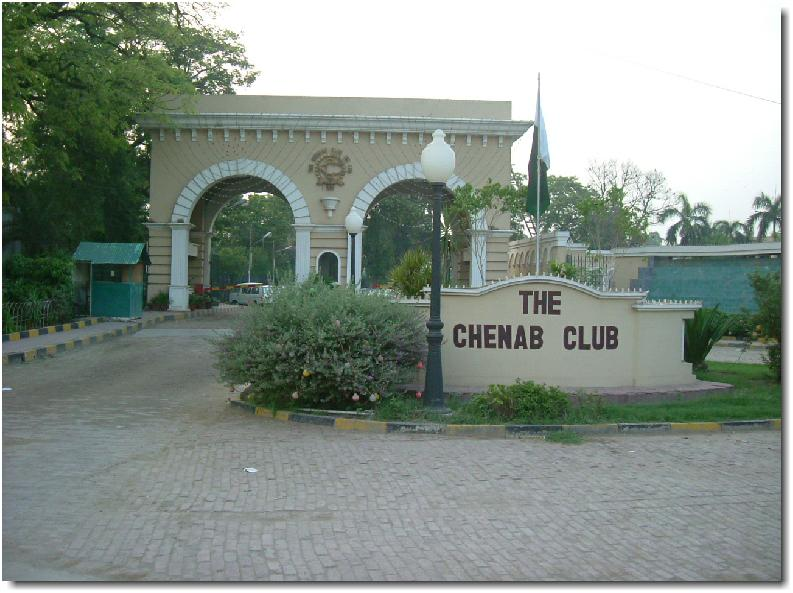
The Chenab Club

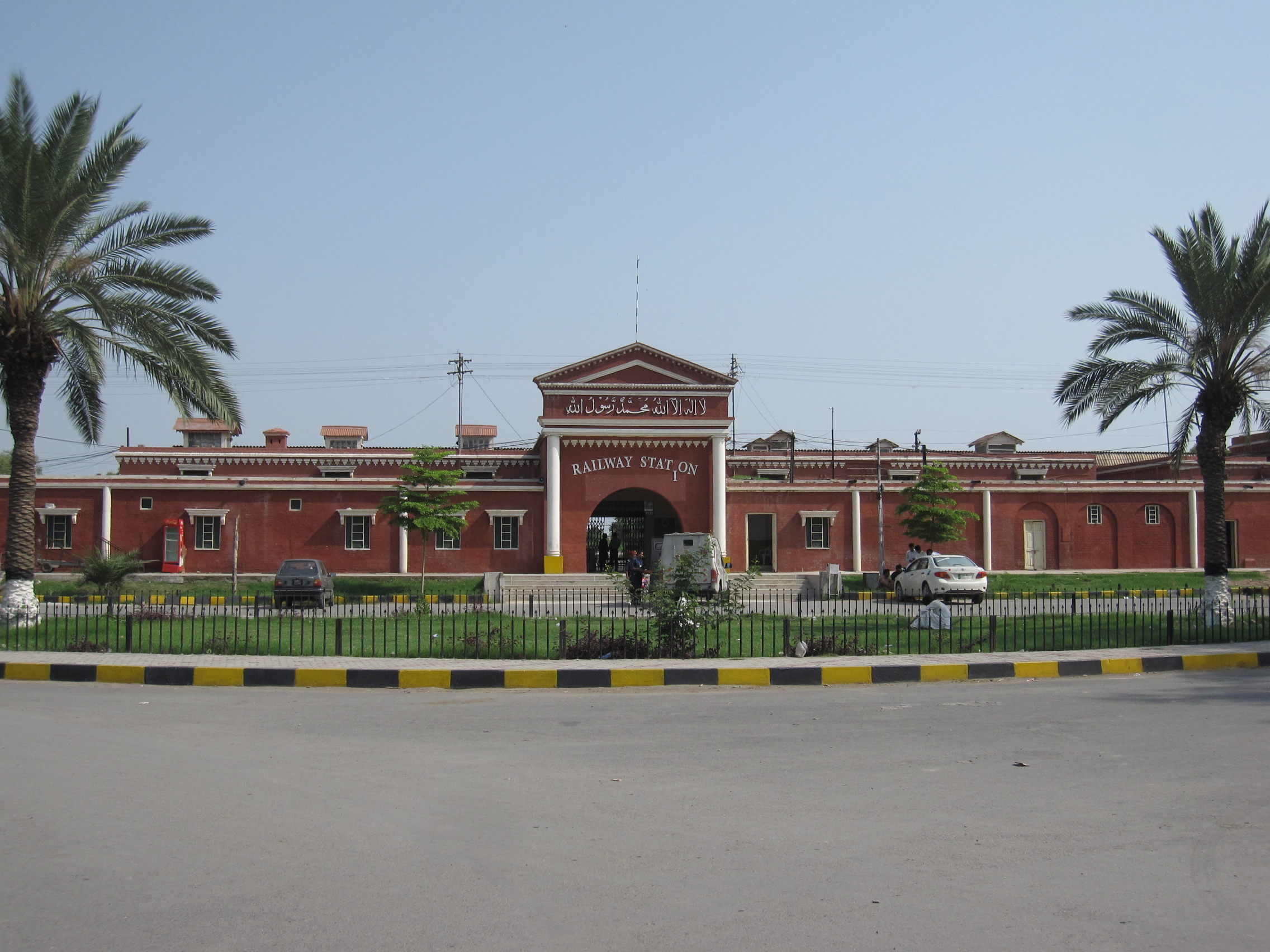
Faisalabad Railway Station

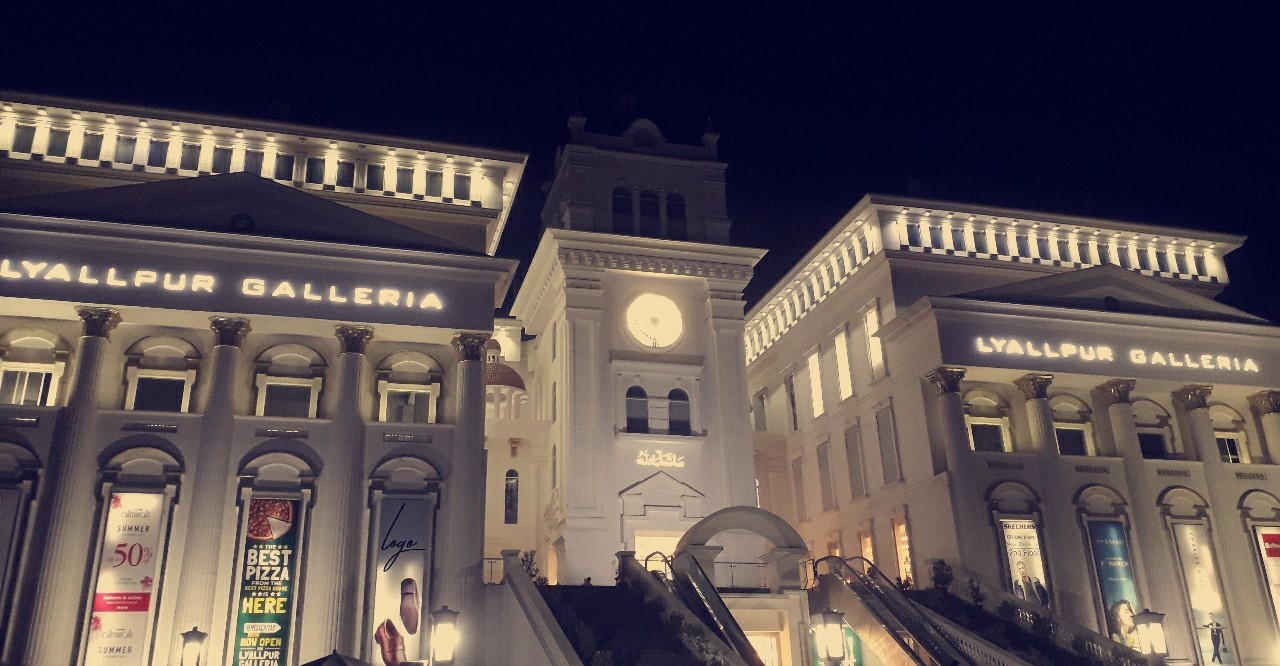
Lyallpur Galleria

=== Modern architecture ===
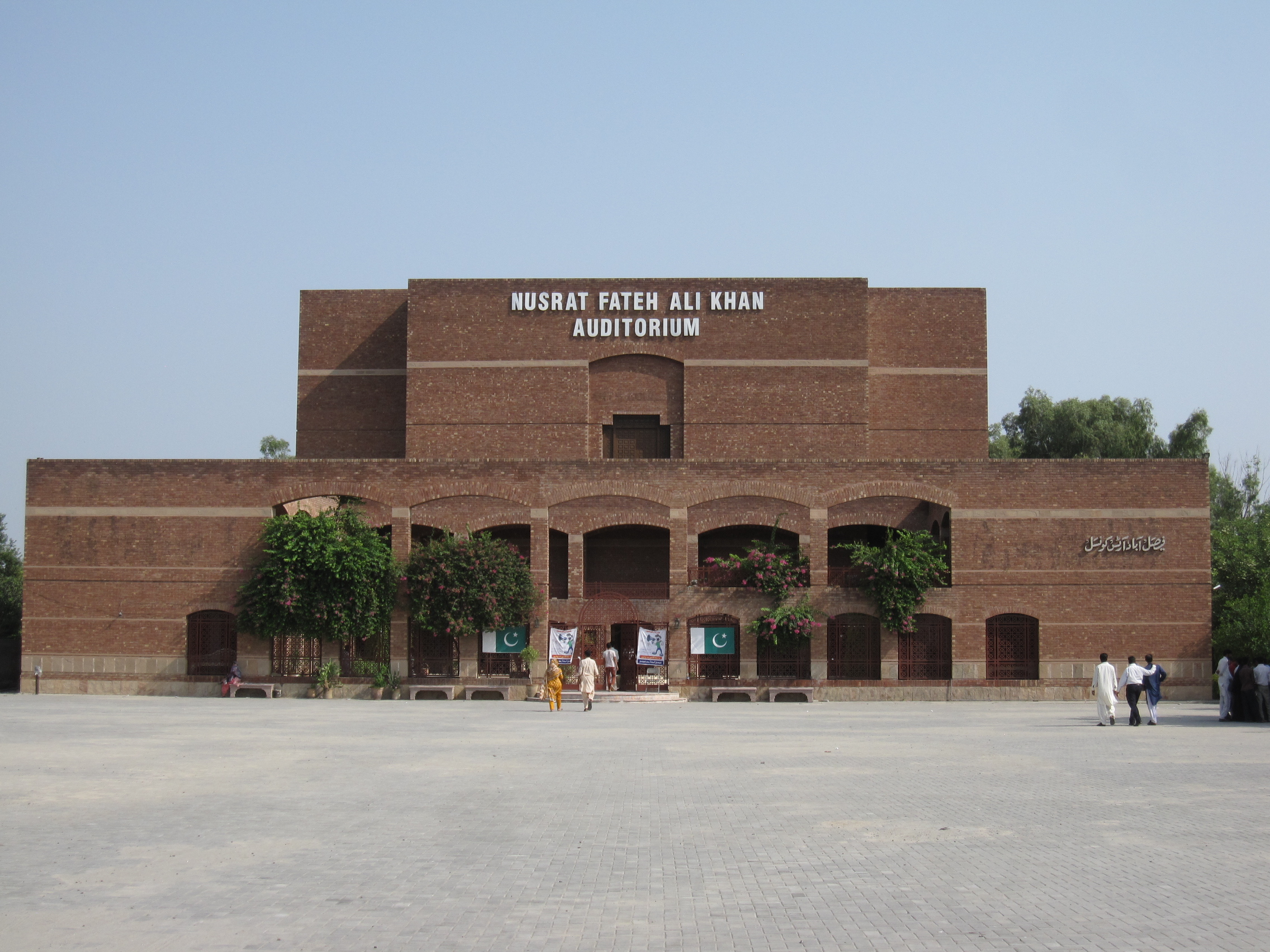
Nusrat Fateh Ali Khan Auditorium

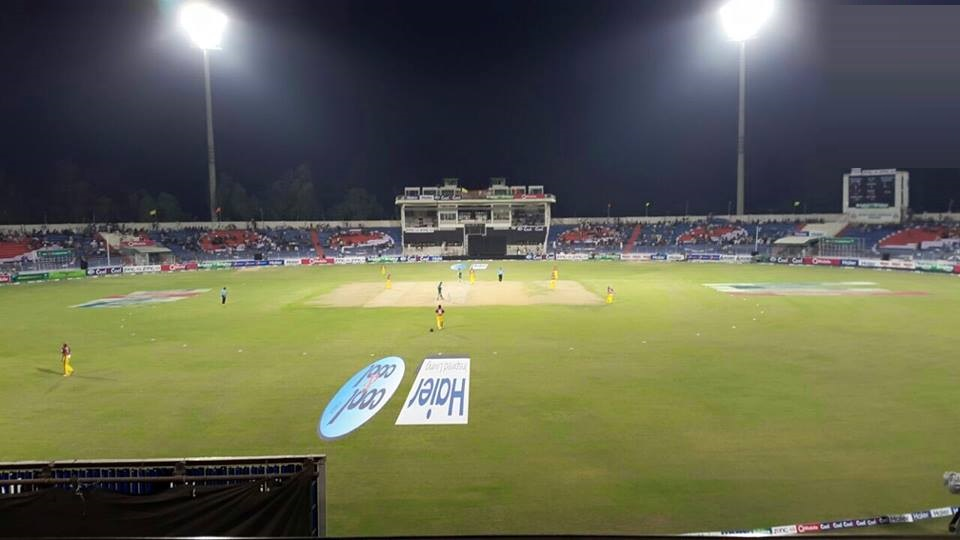
Iqbal Cricket Stadium

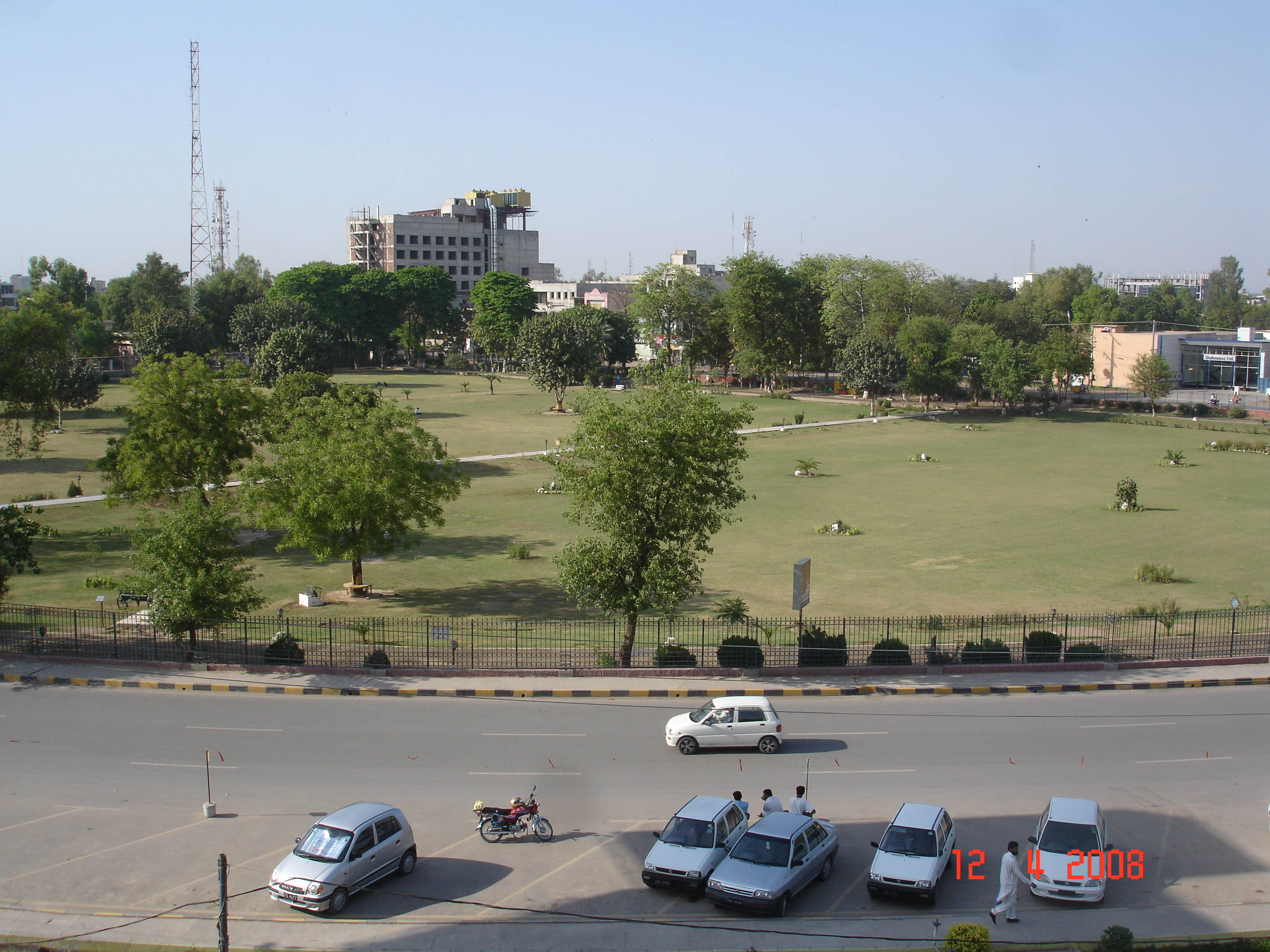
D Ground Commercial Area

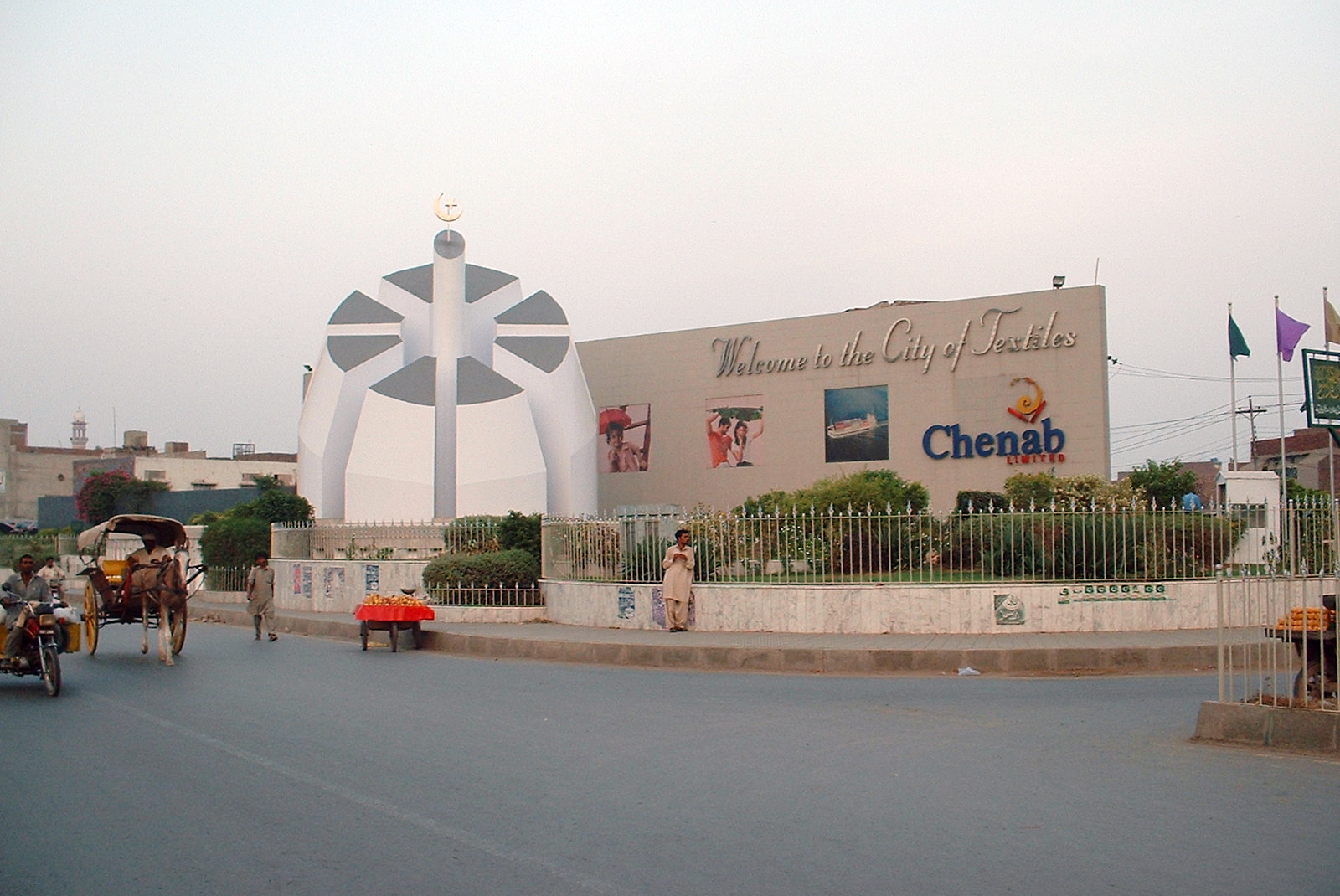
Chenab Chowk

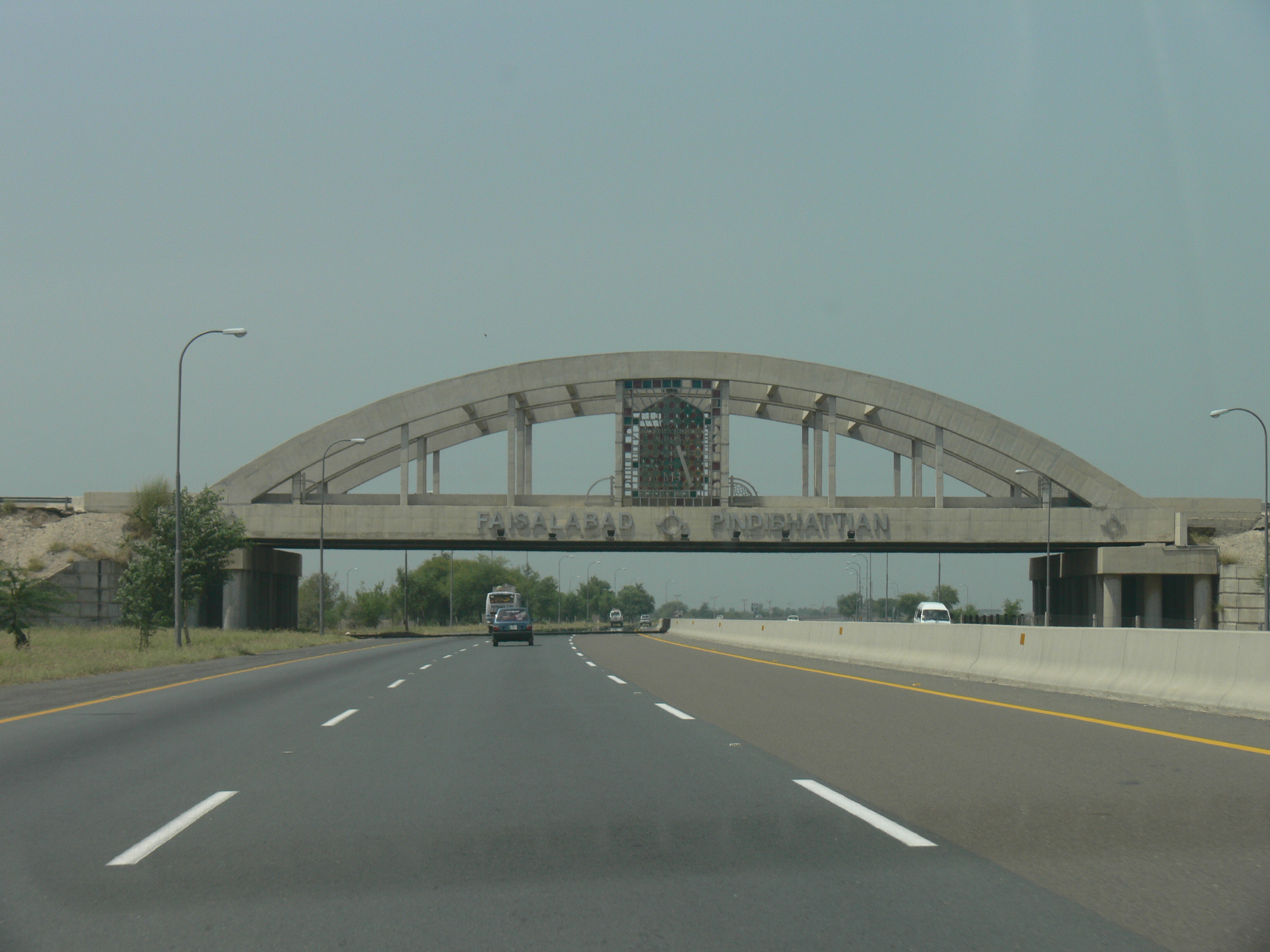
Pindi Bhattian Interchange

== Colonial buildings ==
Structures built by the British Empire.

- Faisalabad Clock Tower
- Faisalabad Railway Station
- Gumti Water Fountain
- Qaisery Gate
- Central Jail Faisalabad

== Libraries ==
- University of Agriculture Libraries
- Faisalabad Medical University Main Library
- Government College University Library
- National Textile University Library
- Government college women university Faisalabad library

== Museums ==
- Lyallpur Museum
- Agricultural Museum
- Science Center Museum

== Shopping ==
=== Markets ===
The Faisalabad clock tower and its eight bazaars (markets) are still a major trading zone in the city today. Each of the eight bazaars has a special name and is known for selling certain goods;

- Katchery Bazaar, named for the court (Katchery) is known for its mobile phone and accessory market.
- Rail Bazar is a gold and cloth market.
- Bhawana Bazaar supplies electrical and electronic goods.
- Jhang Bazaar supplies fish, meat, vegetables and fruits.
- Aminpur Bazaar supplies stationery and interior décor.
- Kharkhana Bazaar is known for herbal medicines.
- Gol Bazaar contains dry fruit, as well as wholesale soap, oil, and ghee shops.
- Chiniot Bazaar is famous for allopathic and homeopathic medicinal stores, cloth, blankets, sofa cloth, and curtains. It also has poultry feed wholesale shops.
- Montgomery Bazaar (also known as Sutar Mandi) is known for yarn and raw cloth trading.

== Parks ==
- Gatwala Wildlife Park

== Sports ==
- Iqbal Stadium, Cricket Stadium
- Faisalabad Hockey Stadium
- Faisalabad Cricket High performance center

== Entertainment ==
- Sindbad Amusement Park
- Funland
- Gatwala Wildlife Park

== Religious ==
=== Shrines ===
There are a number of Sufi Muslim sites in the city.

- Baba Noor Shah Wali - Graveyard Near Lorry Ada
- Baba Lasoori Shah - Reegal Road, Jhang Bazaar
- Baba Shah Saleem Peer Bahwal Haq - Peoples Colony no: 1.
- Baba Qaim Sain - Mohallah Faizabad* Baba Rati Rata Wali Sarkar - 70 GB
- Sufi Barkat Ali Ludhianwi - Dalowal Samundri Road
- Darbar Baba Lal shah Chak - 46 GB samundri Road
- Darbar e Ghousia
- Darbar Imam Jalvi
- Darbar Mahi Shah Sarkar
- Darbar Sakhi Baba Malan Shah Qadir Qalandar Mast - Narwala Road
- Darbar Syed Bahadur Ali Shah, 229-RB Makuana
- Baba Gujjar Peer - Ghulam Muhammad Abad
- Mohadas-e-Azam' Molna Saradr Ahmad - Jhang Bazaar
- Rehmani Darbar Sharif
- Sabri Darbar

=== Churches ===
- Cathedral of Sts. Peter and Paul

=== Gurdwaras ===
- Gurudwara Panjvin Patshahi Lyallpur

== Roads ==
- Abdullahpur Flyover (Crossing Faisalabad Railway Station)
- Nishatabad Flyover (Crossing Sangla Hill Road & railway lines at Nishatabad)

== Hospitals ==
- Al Noor Hospital
- Allied Hospital (Teaching hospital of Faisalabad Medical University)
- DHQ Hospital, Faisalabad (Teaching hospital of Faisalabad Medical University)
- Children Hospital, Faisalabad (Institute of Child health Faisalabad)
- St. Raphael's Hospital

== See also ==
- List of places in Lahore
- List of places in Multan
