= Abdullahpur =

Abdullahpur may refer to:

- Yamunanagar previously known as Abdullahpur, Haryana, India
- Abdullahpur, Faisalabad, Punjab, Pakistan
- Abdullahpur, Jhelum, Punjab, Pakistan
- Abdullahpur Flyover, overpass in Faisalabad, Pakistan
- Abdullahpur Mori, Ghaziabad District, Uttar Pradesh, India
- Abdullapurmet, village in India
