= Iqbal Town =

Iqbal Town or Allama Iqbal Town (named after poet-philosopher Muhammad Iqbal) may refer to:

- Allama Iqbal Town, Lahore, Pakistan
- Iqbal Town, Faisalabad, Pakistan
- Iqbal Town, Muzaffargarh, Pakistan
