= Islamabad Zoo cum Botanical Garden =

- Date opened: 1989
- Location: Islamabad, Pakistan
- Land area: 725 acres

The Islamabad Zoo cum Botanical Garden is a large zoo and botanical garden located in Islamabad, Pakistan. The concept of establishing the Zoo-Botanical Garden combination was integrated into Islamabad's Master Plan back in 1968. This facility holds the distinction of being the most expansive joint zoo and botanical garden in Pakistan.

== History ==
In 1989, an expanse of 725 acres of land located in the Bani Galla region, spanning across four designated areas (Mohra Noor, Phulgran, Atthal, and Mallot) within Islamabad, was designated for the use of the Zoological Survey of Pakistan. This allocation was made in accordance with an agreement, and the Zoological Survey of Pakistan was granted physical possession of the land by the Capital Development Authority. Following a directive from the Chief Executive Secretariat in 2002, a comprehensive process to accurately demarcate the aforementioned land was set in motion. As part of this process, the Survey of Pakistan undertook the task of erecting a total of 160 boundary markers to define the limits of the 725-acre land parcel.

== Controversies ==
In 2019, the Auditor General of Pakistan (AGP) has initiated an investigation into the Ministry of Climate Change's inability to create a botanical garden, despite having been granted ownership of 583 acres of land for this purpose nearly two decades ago.

In May 2022, satellite imagery unveiled a substantial area of the safeguarded Zoo-cum-Botanical Garden adjacent to Bhara Kahu had been illicitly seized by private developers. The available information indicates that these private builders took down pillars originally set up for constructing residential buildings, evidently driven by financial motives. As the government had previously erected a total of one hundred and sixty boundary pillars with the intention of safeguarding the 725-acre expanse of the Zoo-cum-Botanical Garden.
