= List of botanical gardens in Pakistan =

A botanical garden is a place where plants, especially ferns, conifers and flowering plants, are grown and displayed for the purposes of research and education. This distinguishes them from parks and pleasure gardens where plants, usually with showy flowers, are grown for public amenity only. Botanical gardens that specialize in trees are sometimes referred to as arboretums. They are occasionally associated with universities and zoos.

== Research botanical gardens ==
- Abdul Wali Khan University Botanical Garden, Mardan
- Botanic Garden of Islamia University, Bahawalpur
- Botanical Garden, Governor's House, Lahore
- Botanical Garden, Govt Zamindar College, Gujrat
- Botanic Garden of Qarshi Industries, Hattar
- Danishmandan Botanic Garden, Lahore
- Botanical Garden, University of the Punjab, Quaid-e-Azam Campus, Lahore
- Botanic Garden of Government College for Women, Samanabad, Lahore
- Botanic Garden of Government College University, Faisalabad
- Botanic Garden University of Agriculture, Faisalabad
- Faisalabad Botanical Gardens (part of Gatwala Wildlife Park), Faisalabad
- Forman Christian College Botanic Garden, Lahore
- Botanical Collections of Kashyap's Museum at Government College University, Lahore, Lahore
- Lahore Botanical Gardens of Government College University, Lahore, Lahore
- Botanic Garden at Sindh University, Jamshoro
- Karachi University Botanic Garden of Karachi University, Karachi
- Liaqat Ali Botanic Garden, Peshawar
- National Herbarium, Islamabad
- Pakistan Forest Institute Botanical Garden of Pakistan Forest Institute, Peshawar
- Quaid-i-Azam University Botanical Garden, Islamabad
- Shah Abdul Latif Herbarium and Botanical Garden of Shah Abdul Latif University, Khairpur
- University of Peshawar Botanical Garden of University of Peshawar, Peshawar
- Living Plants Museum of Medicinal Plants, Pakistan Forest Institute, Peshawar
- Shakarganj Sugar Research Institute Botanical Garden, Jhang

== Public botanical gardens ==
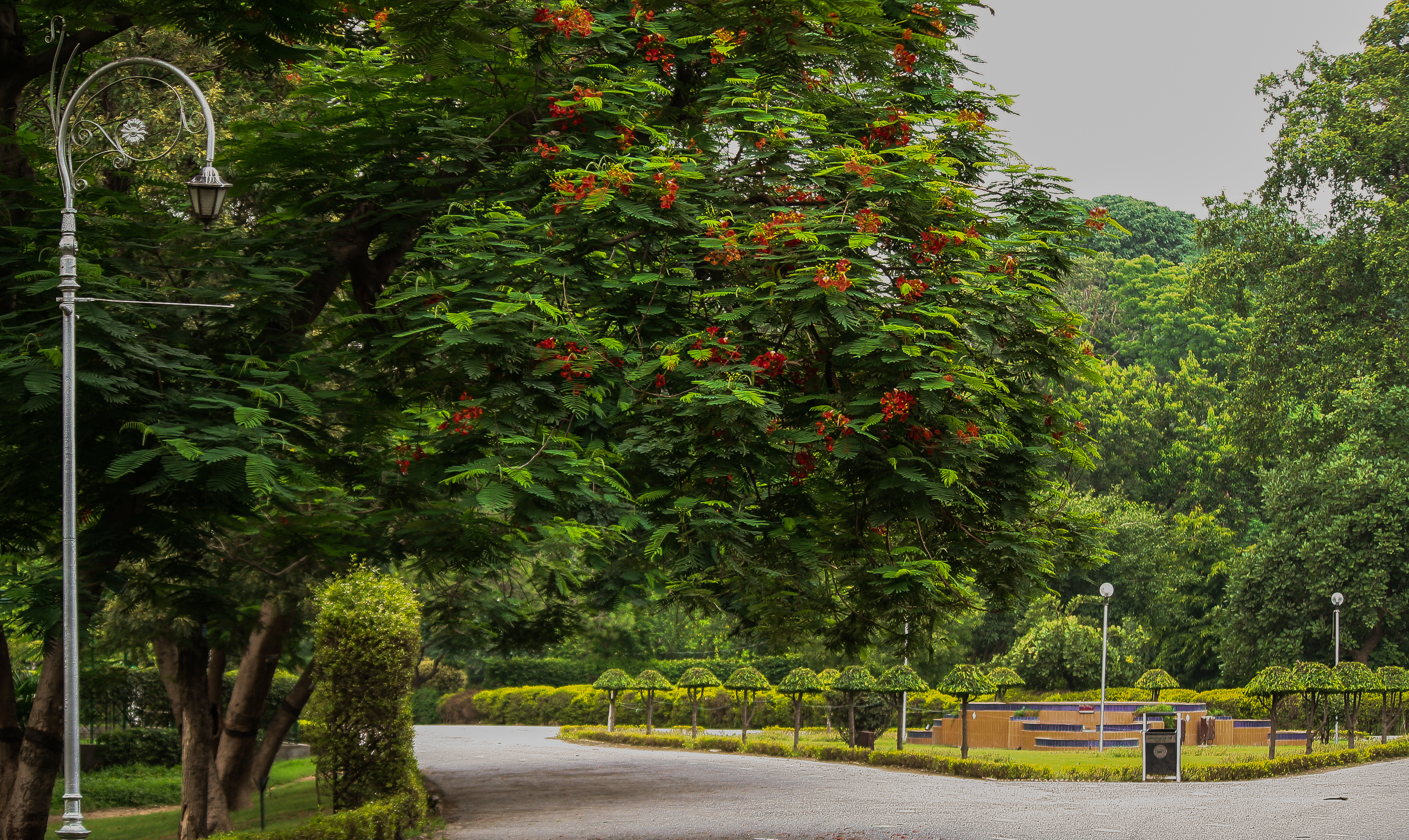
Bagh Jinnah in Lahore Pakistan

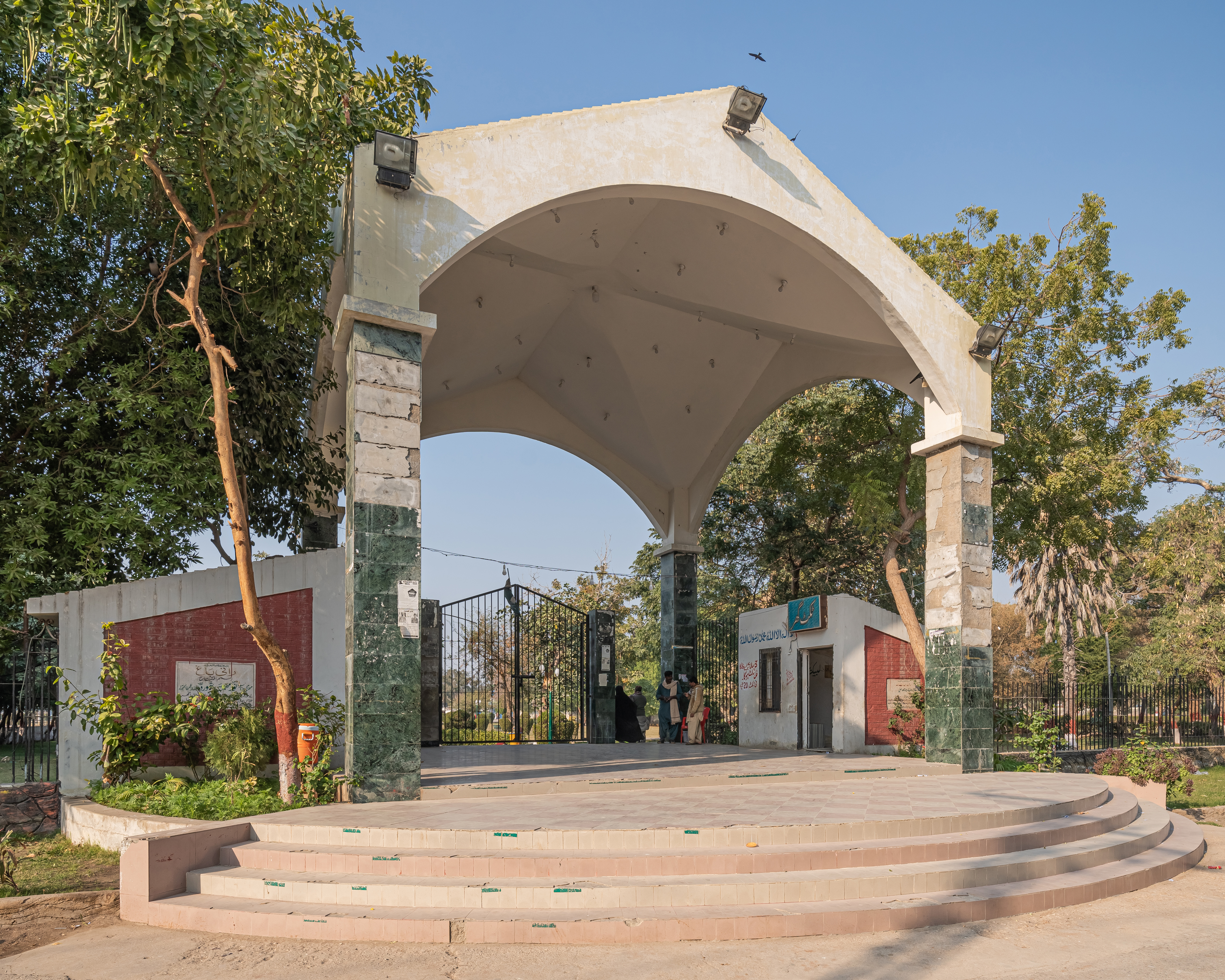
Rani Bagh entry gate
- Bagh-e-Jinnah, Lahore
- Islamabad Zoo cum Botanical Garden
- Rani Bagh Arboretum, Hyderabad
- Sukh Chayn Gardens, Lahore
- Botanical Garden Jallo, Lahore

== See also ==
- List of botanical gardens
- List of parks and gardens in Pakistan
- List of zoos in Pakistan
