= Gatwala Wildlife Park, Faisalabad =

Zoo in Faisalabad, Punjab, Pakistan

Coordinates: 31°28′41″N 73°12′30″E

- Interactive map of Gatwala Wildlife Park, Faisalabad
- Date opened: 1992
- Location: Gatwala, Faisalabad, Punjab, Pakistan
- Land area: 100 square kilometres (39 sq mi)

Gatwala Wildlife Park, Faisalabad is a wildlife park, botanical garden and breeding center located in the town of Gatwala in Faisalabad, Punjab, Pakistan.

It is situated near Khurrianwala and 140 kilometres (87 mi) from Lahore Zoo.

It is the largest park of Faisalabad. Gatwala Forest Park is a large compound of more than 100 km^{2} (39 sq mi) that houses forest areas, parks, lakes, and administrative buildings of the Ministry of Forestry, Government of Pakistan. Situated on the Shiekhupura Road / Lahore Road, it is some 20 km from the Clock Tower, Faisalabad. It is situated next to many residential colonies and towns of Metropolis of Faisalabad as a result of the extreme expansion of residential areas of Faisalabad.

The main attractions in Gatwala Park are the huge green parks that house a few rides for children, flowing canals across the park, bamboo growing area, large forest areas and two lakes. Boating facilities are available in one lake. The other lake is home to many crocodiles. Proper cordoning of the latter lake has created a safe area for people to view the crocodiles from a distance.

== History ==
The land where Gatwala Wildlife Park is situated belonged to Punjab Forestry Department. In 1985, the then government of Pakistan, declared Faisalabad a division and announced many upgrade projects. One of these projects was the development of a Wildlife Park in Gatwala. The overall development took 7 years and wildlife park was completed with all its facilities in 1992.

== Facilities ==
Gatwala Wildlife Park is equipped with many facilities to make the visit enjoyable yet close to nature. The following recreational activities are available in Gatwala Wildlife Forest Park Faisalabad.

=== Main Lake ===
This lake lies at the northwest end of Gatwala Wildlife Park and is a good example of natural lake. The lake exhibits moss and tulip flowers and it is also possible to take an oar boat ride.

=== Children Area ===
The main attraction for children is the area in the center of the park that houses many rides, however, in order to maintain aura of natural wildlife, no mechanized ride is installed.

=== Bamboo Forest ===
In the east end of Gatwala Wildlife Park lies the Bamboo Forest area next to a flowing stream. It is a major attraction especially in the summer months because of its thick and cold shadows.

=== Bird Sanctuary ===
A large sized bird sanctuary lies on the northeast part of Gatwala Wildlife Park. This sanctuary houses many local birds species as well as a few from other regions of Pakistan.

=== Crocodile Farm ===
In the north end of Gatwala Wildlife Park visitors can visit a crocodile farm which is the home to many crocodiles and alligators.

=== Open Parks ===
The south end of Gatwala Wildlife Park is a big open ground decorated with many flowers and rare trees. This area is of major attraction for families to come for picnics or to enjoy sun in winter months.

Forest Department, Government of Punjab regularly holds exercises to control forest fires in the area.

== See also ==
- List of zoos in Pakistan
- List of botanical gardens in Pakistan
- Lashari wala Forest
