= Bees Bagla =

- Village
- Location within Azad Kashmir Location within Pakistan
- Coordinates: 34°02′31″N 73°41′2″E
- Country: Pakistan
- Territory: Azad Kashmir
- District: Bagh District
- Time zone: UTC+5 (PST)

Bees Bagla is a village in Bagh District, Azad Kashmir, Pakistan. It is 20 kilometres from the district capital, Bagh, and 4 kilometres from the next village, Mallot. The village was extensively damaged during the 2005 Kashmir earthquake; international aid supported the rebuilding of a school in the village.
