= Jinnah Town =

Jinnah Town may refer to:

- Jinnah Town, Faisalabad, Pakistan
- Jinnah Town, Karachi, Pakistan
