= Qaisery Gate (Rail Bazar) =

Coordinates: 31°25′08.22″N 73°05′02.38″E

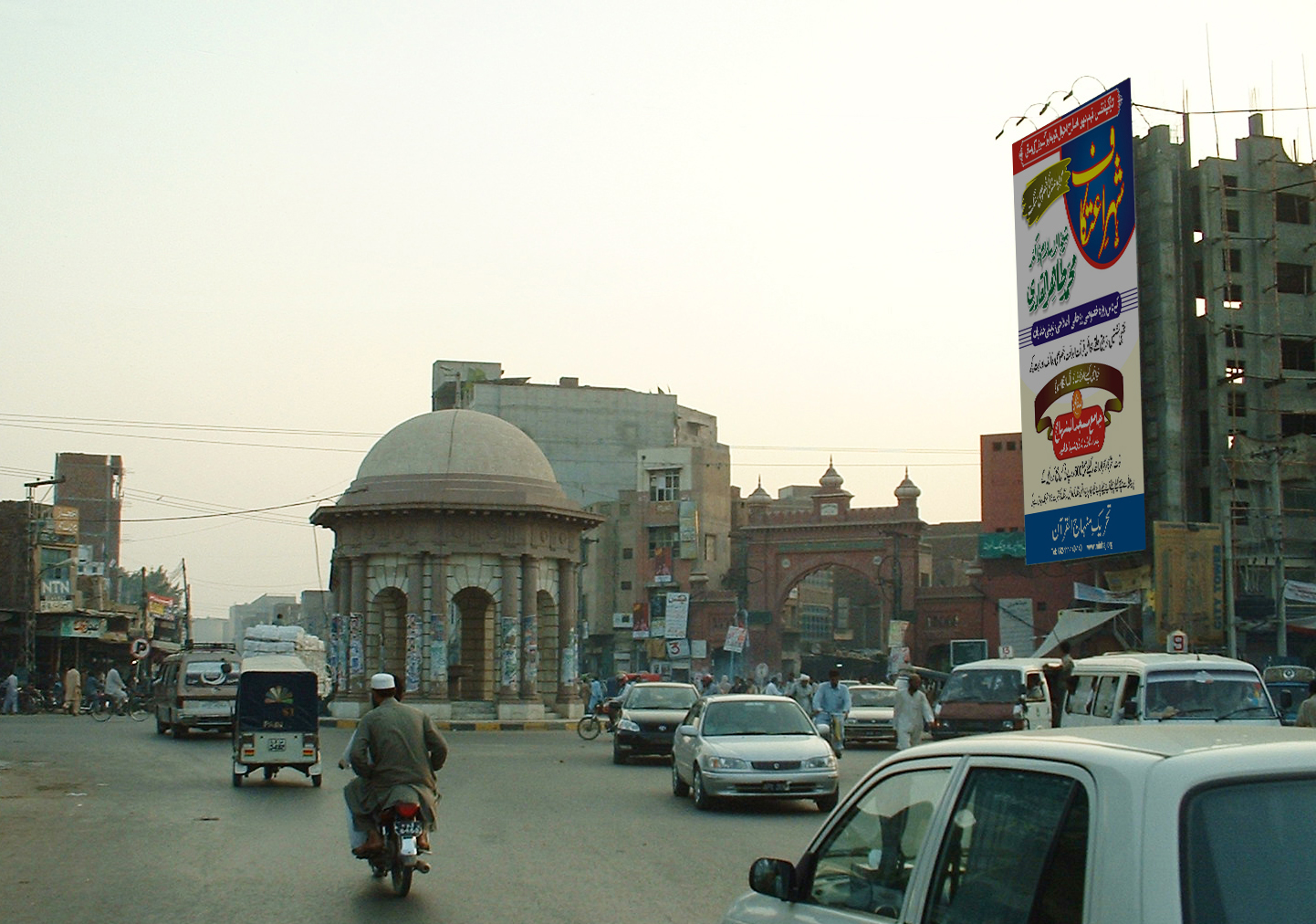
The Gumti situated outside Qaisery Gate (Rail Bazar)

The Qaisery Gate was the gate into the eight markets with the Faisalabad Clock Tower at the centre. It was built in 1897 under the commission of the British Raj in the then newly-emerging city of Faisalabad (then called Lyallpur), Punjab.

The entrance itself is made of reinforced concrete and painted pale yellow and light brown to give it a Mughal look. The gate's original markings are still viewable at the top with the name and the date of construction.

The gate is directly in front of the Faisalabad Gumti Water Fountain in the older part of the city. The gate is located on Railway Road, a large market for bathroom accessories, furniture and many banks.
