= Narma =

Narma may refer to:

- Narma (tribe), located in Pakistan
- North American Reciprocal Museum Association, an association of arts, historical, and cultural institutions
