= Batala Colony =

Residential neighbourhood in Faisalabad, Punjab, Pakistan

Coordinates: 31°23′58.26″N 73°06′1.49″E

Batala Colony Faisalabad, Aqsa Masjid

Batala Colony is a residential neighbourhood in southern Faisalabad, Pakistan. It has various educational institutions, parks and markets.

== Geography ==
Batala Colony is located between Peoples Colony No. 1 & Peoples Colony No. 2 and the Main Boulevard Road.

1. Peoples Colony No 1 is located in the north-east
2. Sohailabad and Sharif Pura are located in the north-west
3. Gulbahar Colony and Garden Colony are located in the south-east
4. Peoples Colony No 2 is located in the south-west

== History ==
Before settlement, the area was originally used as orange plantations.

Batala Colony was established in the early 1950s by the Gurdaspur Mohajereen Society. It was originally gated and the standard plot sizes were 8 kanal along Satyana Road, 4 kanal, 2 kanal and 1 kanal along the main road and 15 and 7.7 marla on the inner residential roads. The plots were allotted originally and the buyers had the option of paying in quarterly installments as well. The green belt which runs in the middle of the main road was walled and gated originally with swings and slides. It was tree lined and was at the same level as the main road however in 1998 the road was rebuilt at a higher level. Originally the area was intended exclusively for residential purposes.

Although the colony was built at around the same time as Gulberg and Jinnah Colony, the rate of development was slow as the area was further away from already established pre-partition areas. By the 1970s, majority of the plots had been built up. There was a dispute with vegetable and meat vendors at the same time who had illegally occupied the green belt from Satiana Road to Hameed Chowk. The vendors were subsequently removed.

By the late 1990s, the area remained mainly residential with a few schools and colleges along the main road. The price along the main road was about 1.5 lakhs per marla at that time. Mass commercialization took place in the mid-2000s. This was influenced by a number of factors including the increased demand for land for traders who had moved to the area after the 2005 Kashmir earthquake. The price of the land increased exponentially during this period and plazas, CNG stations and more educational institutes were built as a result. To provide parking for these, the green belt in the center of the main road was also developed although the green belt after Hameed Chowk is still to be developed.

== See also ==
- D Ground
