= Zoological Survey of Pakistan =

Wildlife Survey department of the Government of Pakistan

- ZSP محکمہِ جائزہ حیوانیاتیِ پاکستان

Agency overview
- Formed: June 1948; 78 years ago
- Headquarters: Islamabad, Pakistan
- Minister responsible: Advisor to the Prime Minister for Climate Change
- Agency executive: Altaf Hussain, Director-General
- Parent department: Ministry of Climate Change
- Website: Official Website

The Zoological Survey of Pakistan (Urdu: محکمہِ جائزہ حیوانیاتیِ پاکستان) is a department under the Ministry of Climate Change, Government of Pakistan which carries out surveys and research on the distribution, population, and status of animal life in Pakistan.

== See also ==
- Pakistan Environmental Protection Agency
- Wildlife of Pakistan
