= National Council for Conservation of Wildlife (Pakistan) =

Wildlife conservation organization in Pakistan

- Abbreviation: NCCW
- Formation: mid-1970s
- Founded at: Pakistan
- Type: State member of the International Union for Conservation of Nature (IUCN)
- Legal status: Active
- Purpose: Safeguarding wildlife and ecological reserves in Pakistan

The National Council for Conservation of Wildlife (NCCW) is a state member of the International Union for Conservation of Nature (IUCN) since January 1975. The NCPF holds the duty of safeguarding wildlife and ecological reserves in Pakistan. This organization functions under the purview of the Ministry of Climate Change.

== History ==
It was founded during the mid-1970s, the NCCW's initial purpose was to provide direction for conservation initiatives across Pakistan's provinces. Yet, it faced obsolescence under a past government administration, only to be revitalized under the leadership of former Prime Minister Nawaz Sharif on 13 February 2017. This re-establishment of the council involved obtaining endorsement through provincial representation and situating it within the federal Climate Change Ministry.

The inception of the National Conservation Strategy of 1993 marked a significant milestone in initiating the preservation of Pakistan's natural resources and wildlife. Additionally, purposeful resource-managed artificial forests such as Changa Manga, Kamalia plantation, and Chichawatni plantation have been established to fulfill roles in forest conservation.

In 2008, the NCCW made a determination to discourage the commercial exporting of wildlife and implemented a fresh fee arrangement for the importing and exporting of diverse species of wildlife.
