= Gatti, Faisalbad =

Village in Faisalabad, Pakistan

Gatti (Village) گٹی
- Village
- 202 RB Gatti
- Country: Pakistan
- Province: Punjab
- District: Faisalabad
- Tehsil: Faisalabad

Population
  - Total: 60,000
- Time zone: UTC+5 (PKT)
- Postal code: 38000

Gatti, officially 202 RB Gatti, is a rural locality situated in the Faisalabad District of Punjab, Pakistan. It is part of the administrative division of the Tehsil of Faisalabad, a major city known for its industrial importance. The area of Gatti 202 RB is primarily agricultural, with a rich history of farming and rural development.

== Geography ==
Gatti is located in the eastern part of Faisalabad District, about 10.2 kilometers away from the city Clock Tower. The region is part of the vast fertile plains of the Punjab region, which are irrigated by the Rakh Branch canal systems of the river Chenab. The climate of the area is hot in the summer, with mild winters, typical of the Punjab's agricultural belt.

== History ==
The history of Gatti can be traced back to the establishment of its agricultural settlements. Like many other rural regions in Punjab, the area has been home to traditional farming communities for centuries. Over time, with the growth of Faisalabad city, rural settlements like Gatti 202 RB have experienced gradual infrastructural development.

The region has seen advancements in farming techniques and crop cultivation, aided by local government initiatives. The area's proximity to Faisalabad has also led to improvements in road networks and accessibility, allowing better trade routes for local produce.

== Economy ==
The economy of Gatti is primarily based on agriculture. The area is known for producing various crops, including wheat, rice, and sugarcane. Additionally, there are smaller-scale vegetable and fruit farms that cater to local markets. The fertile soil and availability of irrigation have made it an ideal location for farming activities.

In recent years, there has been some diversification into other economic activities, including small-scale industries and businesses catering to the agricultural sector.

== Education ==
Education in Gatti is provided primarily by local schools. There are several public and private educational institutions that serve the children of the area, offering primary and secondary education. Some of the schools in the region include:

- Government Islamia Higher Secondary School
- Govt Model Girls Higher Secondary School
- Primary Boys School
- Primary Girls School

However, the area still faces challenges in terms of access to higher education, with many students traveling to Faisalabad for college and university studies.

== Infrastructure and services ==
Gatti has seen improvements in its infrastructure, including the construction of better roads and the provision of basic utilities such as electricity, water, and gas. However, like many rural areas, some parts of Gatti 202 RB continue to experience challenges with sanitation and healthcare access. The local government has undertaken initiatives to improve healthcare facilities, but there is still a reliance on nearby Faisalabad for more specialized medical services.

== Transportation ==
Transportation in 202 RB Gatti is mainly road-based. The area is connected to the city of Faisalabad via a network of rural roads, highways and Gatti railway station . There is also a system of public transportation, including buses and vans, that allows residents to commute to Faisalabad for work, education, and other purposes.

== Cultural and religious sites ==
A significant cultural and religious landmark in 202 RB Gatti is the Darbar Baba Muhammad Ali Shrine, which is an important place for the local community. Pilgrims from surrounding areas visit the shrine to pay their respects. The shrine is often associated with local traditions and religious gatherings, especially during the annual festivals.

== Sports and recreation ==
Gatti is also home to several sports grounds and community centers. These facilities provide recreational spaces for the local population and host various sporting events, particularly in the areas of cricket and football. The sports grounds serve as a hub for youth engagement and community-building activities. The local government and community organizations have worked to improve these recreational areas in recent years.

== Culture and society ==
Gatti, like many rural areas in Punjab, has a rich cultural heritage. The residents predominantly speak Punjabi, and the community maintains traditional agricultural practices and rural customs. Local festivals, agricultural fairs, and social gatherings are an important part of life in the area.

Religious practices play a significant role in the daily life of the community. Islam is the dominant religion, with most residents adhering to Sunni Islam. The region also hosts several mosques that serve as centers for both spiritual and social activities.

== See also ==
- Agriculture in Pakistan
