= Gobind Pura =

Gobind Pura is one of the oldest residential areas in Faisalabad, in central Punjab, Pakistan. It is centrally located near the city's Clock Tower, known as "Ghanta Ghar". On the main Narwala Road, Gobind Pura is located opposite the Agriculture University of Faisalabad and adjacent to Jinnah Colony.

Gobind Pura's buildings represent both the old and new architecture. The main road situated between Gobind Pura and Jinnah Colony (Gulberg Road) has been converted into a highly commercialized area with several hospitals, clinics, restaurants, schools, bakeries and outlets of various national and international brands. Four mosques are located in the area as well.
