= Madina Town =

Tehsil municipal administration area of Faisalabad, Pakistan

- Town
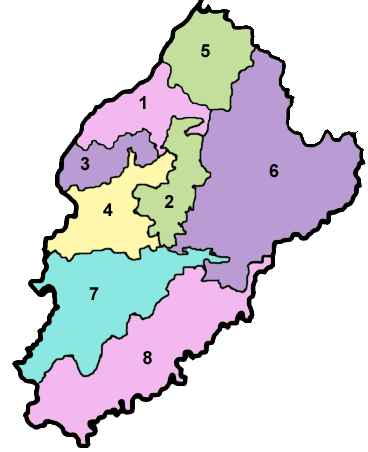
- Map of Faisalabad showing Madina Town in the centre (2)

- Location within Pakistan
- Coordinates: 31°25′15″N 73°07′20″E
- Country: Pakistan
- Province: Punjab
- District: Faisalabad
- Time zone: UTC+5 (PST)

Madina Town is a residential neighborhood in Faisalabad, Pakistan.

Located near Susan Road, it is considered one of the posh parts of the city. It became a municipal administration area (town) in 2005. Madina Town and Saeed Colony No. 1 & 2 are urban areas of Madina Town.

Its main villages are Bhaiwala, Gatti, Manawala, and Dhuddi Wala. It is mainly situated between Canals 213/RB and 214/RB.

== Education ==
A number of major schools and colleges of the city are located in Madina Town. These include:

- Junior branch of Divisional Model College, Faisalabad
- Shibile College
- Faisalabad Grammar High School
- Government School, Madina Town, Faisalabad
- Government College Women University Faisalabad
- Government Islamia High School, Gatti
- Dar-e-Arqam School, Madina Town, Faisalabad
