= Mallot =

- Location within Azad Kashmir
- Coordinates: 34°05′50″N 73°40′50″E
- Country: Pakistan
- Province: Azad Kashmir
- Time zone: UTC+5 (PST)

Mallot is a town in Bagh District, Azad Kashmir, Pakistan. It is situated 17 km north west from Parliament House and to the east of Muree. In addition to its scenery, the area is known for its historic background.

== People ==
The people of Mallot belong to various tribes, such as Hindu, Dhanyal, Sudhan, Narma, Mughal, Khakha, Taziyal Rajpooth, Qurashi, Hashmi, Janjua Rajpoot, and Dhund Abbasi. Mallot is one of the places in Kashmir where all the major tribes have lived for a long time.

== Surroundings ==
Mallot is the centre point of four [Union Councils], namely union council Thub, union council Mallot, union council Jaglari, and union council Rangla. Bhuti, Gani Abad, Ban Gran, Kuri, Pail, Sarmandle, Bees Bagla, Dhar, Chalandrat, Channat, Choor, Huroot and Sudhn Gallah are different villages. Among all Sarmandle and Channat are most beautiful villages of Mallot.They have 90% literacy rate, which make them prominent villages of District Bagh. As well as they have high literacy rate and high employment rate in comparison with other villages. People of villages are religious brave and they love sports.

=== Culture ===
People have simple culture. They have simple ceremonies of marriage, eid, and other festivals. They love all religions. Different languages are spoken, like Urdu, Pahari, and Kashmiri. Kashmiri literature has a rich history stretching back hundreds of years. People like local music like bait and kashmiri music. They love to play different games like cricket, volleyball, hockey, and football.

=== Roads ===
Mallot is well connected with major roads. It is connected with the Main Rawalpindi-Bagh road via Jaglari Namanpora. From the southwest, it is connected via Harigal; from the west it is connected via Challa; from the northwest, it is connected via Bisbagla Dhirkot and Kot Tarhala Muzaffarabad; from the northeast, it is connected via Thob, Panili road; from the northwest, it is connected to the town of Rangla.

=== Schools and colleges ===
There is one girls Degree college, one boys inter science college, and some private schools. In addition, many primary and middle schools for both boys and girls are also available in the surrounding villages. There is one private degree college and three high schools.

=== Mallot Educational Trust ===
Mallot Educational Trust, formally registered in 2006, forms part of a response to the cataclysmic earthquake that shook Azad Kashmir in 2005. Founded and, as of now, almost entirely funded by the settler, a resident of Mallot area, and his family, the trust sought, in the first stage, to ‘establish, maintain and develop a central public library and reading rooms’ in the area, and then to establish information technology centres for the area.

=== TAG Engineering and Construction Private Limited ===
TAG Engineering and Construction Private Limited is graciously playing its role in the development of the area and strengthening the educational sector of Mallot. TAG is busy in the Construction of Boys and Girls Intermediate Colleges at Mallot. Almost 70% of the project has been completed and the remaining shall be accomplished by the end of 2012.

=== Communication ===
There is one Special Communication Organization's digital exchange which is providing the communication facilities to surrounding villages through landlines and also some major private companies boosters are functioning in the area.

== Occupation ==
There are very few jobs available within Mallot. A number of people are occupying the services in Government of Azad Kashmir and Pakistan, some join the Pakistani Army and reasonable personnel are doing their own business all over Pakistan.

== Earthquake of 2005 ==
Mallot and its surrounding towns were totally destroyed from the 2005 Kashmir earthquake; hundreds of people were killed or injured by this quake. 100% of the population was left homeless. Most of the houses have been reconstructed though with the help of the Governments of Pakistan, Azad Kashmir and local/ International NGOs.

Cuba, along with other countries, provided medical assistance to the population. People are very generous and helpful in this area.

During the earthquake rehabilitation phase, Mallot was a major place for the Pak Army and other NGOs for their rescue and other operations due to its unique location. A President award was given to a Mallot resident Mr. Sayyad Ahmed Khan, Principal of Sahara Children Academy Mallot, for his outstanding performance despite that he himself suffered with earthquake. He has also written a book, Subhe-October Ke Un-Mitt Naqoosh, in which the disastrous moments of the earthquake of 8 October 2005 are mentioned as he saw them. In addition, two more books were written by Mallot residents. Sardar Abdul Aziz Khan wrote Hamalyah Ke Damin Myn Subha Qyimt and Obaid Ahmed Chughtai wrote Hamalyah Ka Kanptha Damin. These books also include the photographs after the disaster that portray that incident. These books also include an acknowledgement and dedication of Pak. army, NGO's, civil society, NATO Forces and the international community.

A monument was constructed near Boys College Mallot in the remembrance of earthquake victims, with the help of Pak Army. The names of all those personnel who died as a result of the earthquake in the area are displayed on the monument.
