= Iqbal Town, Muzaffargarh =

Iqbal Town اقبال ٹاؤن
- Town
- Iqbal Town
- Location in Pakistan
- Coordinates: 30.071111°N 71.13527°E
- Country: Pakistan
- Region: Punjab
- District: Muzaffargarh District

Iqbal Town (Urdu: اقبال ٹاؤن) is a housing complex in Pakistan built for victims of severe floods in July 2010. It is situated on the N-70 National Highway near Muzaffargarh. It contains 296 houses, a mosque, a school, a town hall, a commercial market and six plots for recreational parks.

== History ==
After the flood that killed nearly 2,000 people and affected at least 20 million Pakistanis in 2010, a Turkish Non-governmental organization Kimse Yok, built a small housing complex on a 110-decare area near Muzaffargarh at a cost of Rs 550 million. Constructed in 18 months, the village was inaugurated on September 14, 2013.
