= Ministry of Climate Change and Environmental Coordination =

Government ministry of Pakistan

- وزارت موسمیاتی تبدیلی و ماحولیاتی ہم آہنگی (پاکستان)

Agency overview
- Formed: August 4, 2017; 9 years ago
- Preceding agency: Climate Change Division, Cabinet Secretariat
- Jurisdiction: Government of Pakistan
- Headquarters: Islamabad, 33°43′22.11″N 73°05′46.21″E
- Employees: 173 employees (58 Officers and 115 staff members)
- Annual budget: 802.69 million rupees (2018-19)
- Minister responsible: Musadik Masood Malik
- Deputy Minister responsible: Shezra Mansab Ali Khan, Minister of State
- Agency executive: Ms. Aisha Humera Moriani, Federal Secretary
- Child agencies: Pakistan Environmental Protection Agency; Zoological Survey Department
- Website: www.mocc.gov.pk

The Ministry of Climate Change and Environmental Coordination Urdu: وزارت موسمیاتی تبدیلی و ماحولیاتی ہم آہنگی, is a Cabinet-level ministry of the Government of Pakistan concerned with climate change in Pakistan. Senator Musadik Masood Malik is in charge of the ministry with the status of a Federal Minister.

== Wings ==
The ministry has multiple wings under it, as described below.

- Administration & Development Wing - a total of 173 employees work at the Ministry of Climate Change. This wing is head by a joint secretary. The current Federal Secretary of the Ministry is Ms. Aisha Humera Moriani
- Climate Finance Wing - coordinating, mobilizing, and managing climate finance in order to support the country’s climate change mitigation and adaptation efforts, and to ensure that Pakistan meets its climate-related commitments under national and international frameworks
- Climate Change and Environment Wing - headed by Sr. Joint Secretary (Env/CC)-General. It focuses on Environmental Legislation, trans-boundary (inter-provincial, regional and international) Issues. It also focuses on matters relating to Sustainable Development, Water & Sanitation, Sustainable Urbanization. It is also responsible for multilateral Environmental Agreements (MEAs) including UN Framework Convention on Climate Change (UNFCCC) and Kyoto Protocol.
- Forestry Wing - National policy, plans, strategies and programmes regarding ecology, forestry, wildlife, biodiversity and desertification, and; Coordination, monitoring and implementation of environmental agreements with other countries, international agencies and forums.
- International Cooperation Wing (IC Wing) - streamline and improve coordination with international agencies on environment and climate change related issues
- Mountain Areas Conservancy Fund (MACF) - Mountain Areas Conservancy Project (MACP) - The focus of MACP was on scaling up sustainable management of natural resources, especially biodiversity, from village level to valley level and ultimately to wider landscape level of conservancy.

== Attached departments (agencies) ==
- Global Change Impact Studies Centre
- Pakistan Environmental Protection Agency
- Zoological Survey Department
- National Council for Conservation of Wildlife (Pakistan)
