= Kot Tarhala =

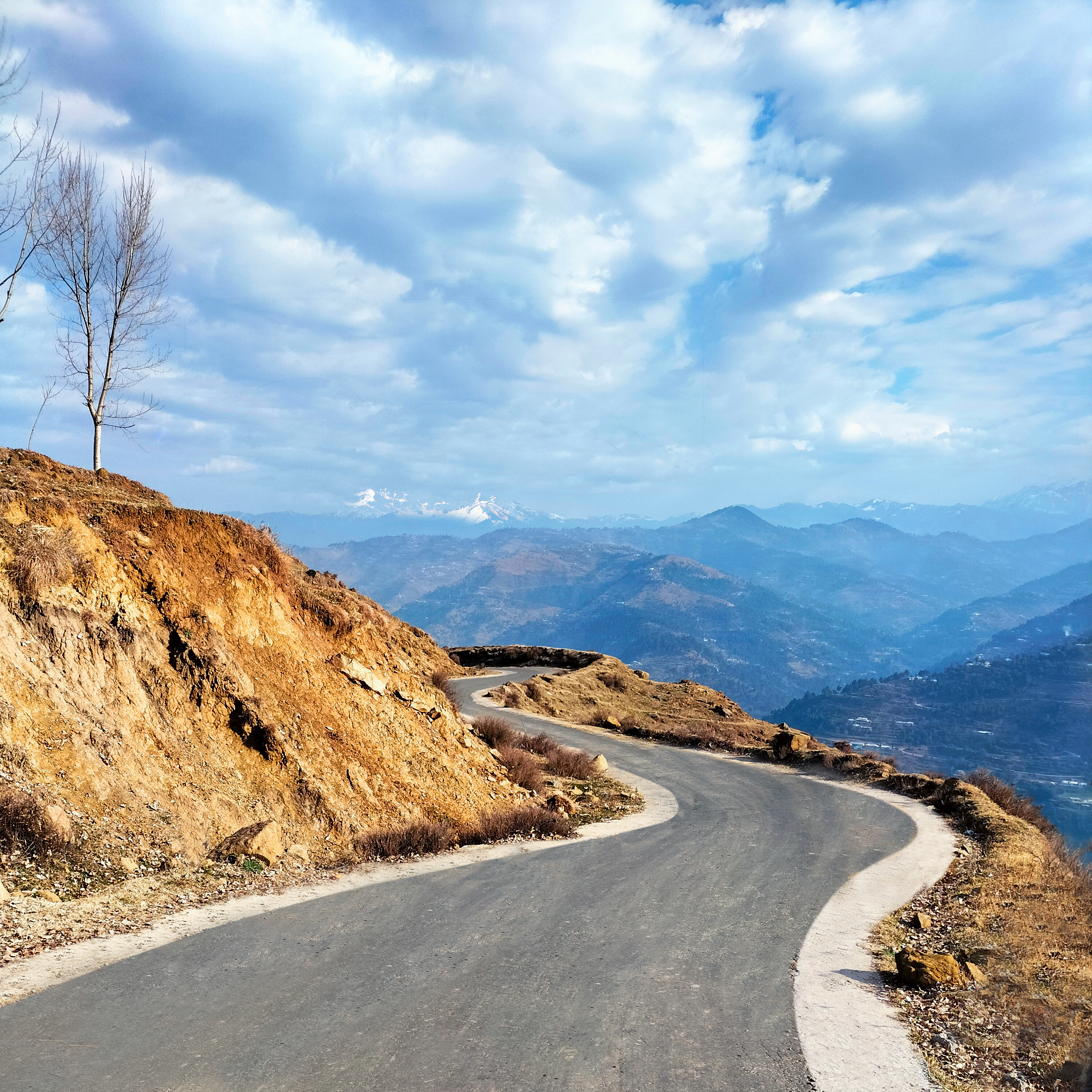

- Location within Azad Kashmir
- Coordinates: 34°05′02″N 73°35′58″E
- District: Muzaffarabad
- State: Azad Kashmir
- Postal code: 13021

Kot Tarhala, a village located in the district of Muzaffarabad in Azad Kashmir, is positioned 52 km away from Muzaffarabad and 141 km from Islamabad. It is well-connected to neighboring towns via roads, with Dana Kachilli lying to the northwest and Dhirkot southeast, enhancing its accessibility and connectivity. This place is also known as Kot Khalsa.
