= Pakistan Environmental Protection Agency =

Executive agency of the Government of Pakistan

- Pak EPA ایجنسی برائے حفاظت ماحولیات

Agency overview
- Formed: November 9, 1997; 28 years ago
- Jurisdiction: Ministry of Climate Change
- Ministers responsible: Malik Amin Aslam, Advisor to the Prime Minister for Climate Change; Zartaj Gul, Minister of State for Climate Change
- Agency executive: Farzana Altaf Shah, Director-General

The Pakistan Environmental Protection Agency (Urdu: ایجنسی برائے حفاظت ماحولیات, abbreviated as Pak-EPA), is an executive agency of the Government of Pakistan managed by the Ministry of Climate Change. The agency is charged with protecting human health and the environment by developing and enforcement mechanisms based on laws passed by Parliament. The Pak-EPA was proposed by Prime Minister Nawaz Sharif; it began operations in 1997 after Parliament passed a law to establish a federal executive agency. The agency is led by an appointed director-general, who is appointed by the Prime Minister on the advice of the Minister of Climate Change. The current director-general is Farzana Altaf Shah. Pak-EPA is not a Cabinet department, but the director-general is normally given the cabinet rank. Farzana Altaf Shah was recently promoted to the cabinet rank. She is the first female Director General appointed on 17 October 2016.

== See also ==
- Cabinet Secretariat (Pakistan)
