= Abdullahpur, Jhelum =

Abdullahpur عبداللہ پور
- Village
- Location in Pakistan
- Coordinates: 32°35′38″N 72°56′36″E
- Country: Pakistan
- Province: Punjab
- District: Jhelum
- Time zone: UTC+5 (PST)
  - Summer (DST): +6

Abdullahpur is a village situated in the Pind Dadan Khan Tehsil of Jhelum District in Punjab, Pakistan. Its geographical coordinates are 32° 38' 0" North, 73° 19' 0" East. It is situated near Jhelum River.

All of the population is Muslim, and belongs to the Aurah Jatt, Hashmi Syed, Phaphra Jatt, and some family of Lohare, Bhatti and Musalli.
