= Abdullahpur Mori =

Village in Uttar Pradesh, India

Coordinates: 28.61909°N 77.78631°E

Abdullahpur Mori is a village in the Hapur district of Uttar Pradesh There is one mosque called Jama Masjid of Village Abdullahpur Mori, India.The Village is around 65 Kilometers from Delhi, 12 km from Hapur and is situated on NH-335 Meerut-Agra Road. Nearest Town is Gulaothi. With time Abdullahpur Mori has shown signs of progress and development. The majority of Population is that of Muslims who prefer to call themselves as NUMBERDAARS(Rajput Muslims). The village has a small population. The nearest town is Gulaothi, and nearby villages include Kurana, Akbarpur, Hirdaypur, and Murshadpur.
