= Lyallpur Town =

Tehsil municipal administration area of Faisalabad, Pakistan

Lyallpur Town is a municipal administration area in Faisalabad city, in Pakistan's Punjab province.
