= Sabiri Darbar Faisalabad =

Sufi shrine in Pakistan

Sabri Darbar Faisalabad is a Sufi shrine, in Faisalabad, Pakistan. The shrine is located at Nishatabad, Faisalabad.

== Namesake ==
Alauddin Sabir Kaliyari, also known as the "Patient Saint of Kaliyar", was a prominent South Asian Sufi saint in the 13th century. He was nephew and Khalifa (successor) to Baba Fareed (1188–1280), and the first in the Sabiriya branch of the Chishti Order. His dargah (Sufi mausoleum), Kaliyar Sharif, is close to Roorkee, near Haridwar, India.

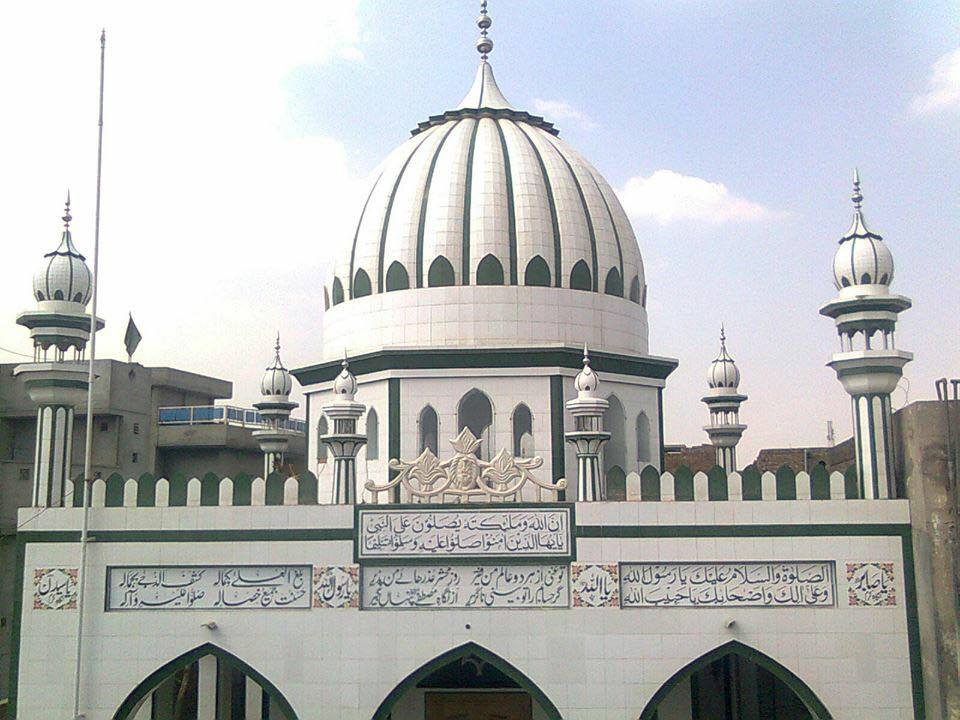
Sabiri Darbar
