= Iqbal Town, Faisalabad =

Tehsil municipal administration area of Faisalabad, Pakistan

Iqbal Town is a large municipal administration area in Faisalabad city, in central Punjab, Pakistan.
