= Gumti Water Fountain =

Monument in Faisalabad, Pakistan

Coordinates: 31°25′08.69″N 73°05′03.99″E

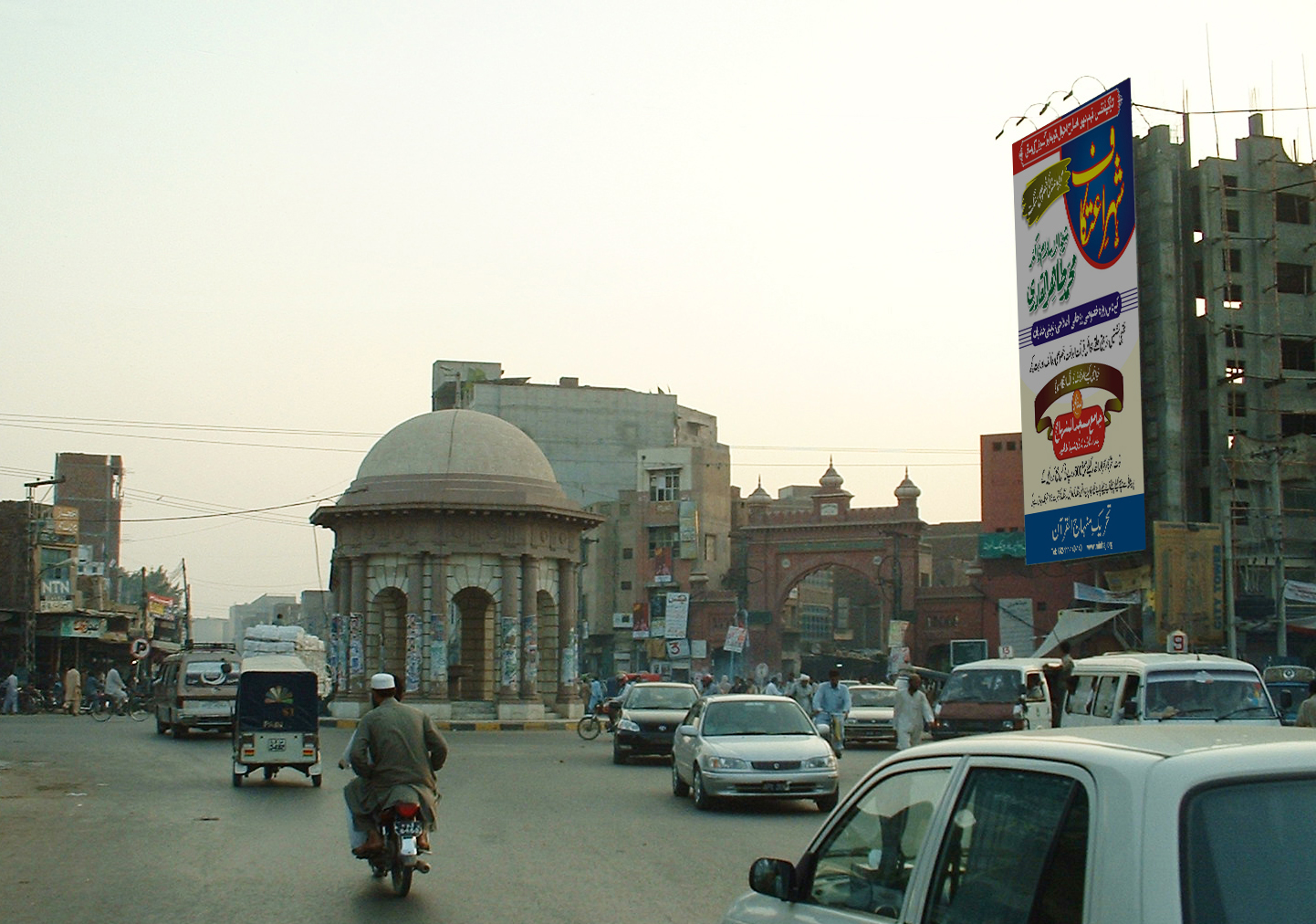
The Gumti situated outside Rail Bazar

The Gumti Water Fountain is a monument in Faisalabad, Pakistan preserved from the British Raj era. It was built during the early nineteenth century and was a general meeting place of the city folk for local town meetings.

Today the structure still exists and has been turned into a roundabout for traffic with the water fountain in the center still functional.

== See also ==
- Faisalabad
- Faisalabad International Airport
- Lahore
- Punjab (Pakistan)
- Pakistan
