= Jinnah Town, Faisalabad =

Tehsil municipal administration area of Faisalabad, Pakistan

Coordinates: 30°13′N 66°59′E

Jinnah Town is a residential neighborhood and a municipal administration area in the city of Faisalabad, Punjab, Pakistan.
