= Abdullahpur Flyover =

Abdullahpur, Faisalabad, Punjab, Pakistan road overpass

Abdullahpur Flyover (road overpass)
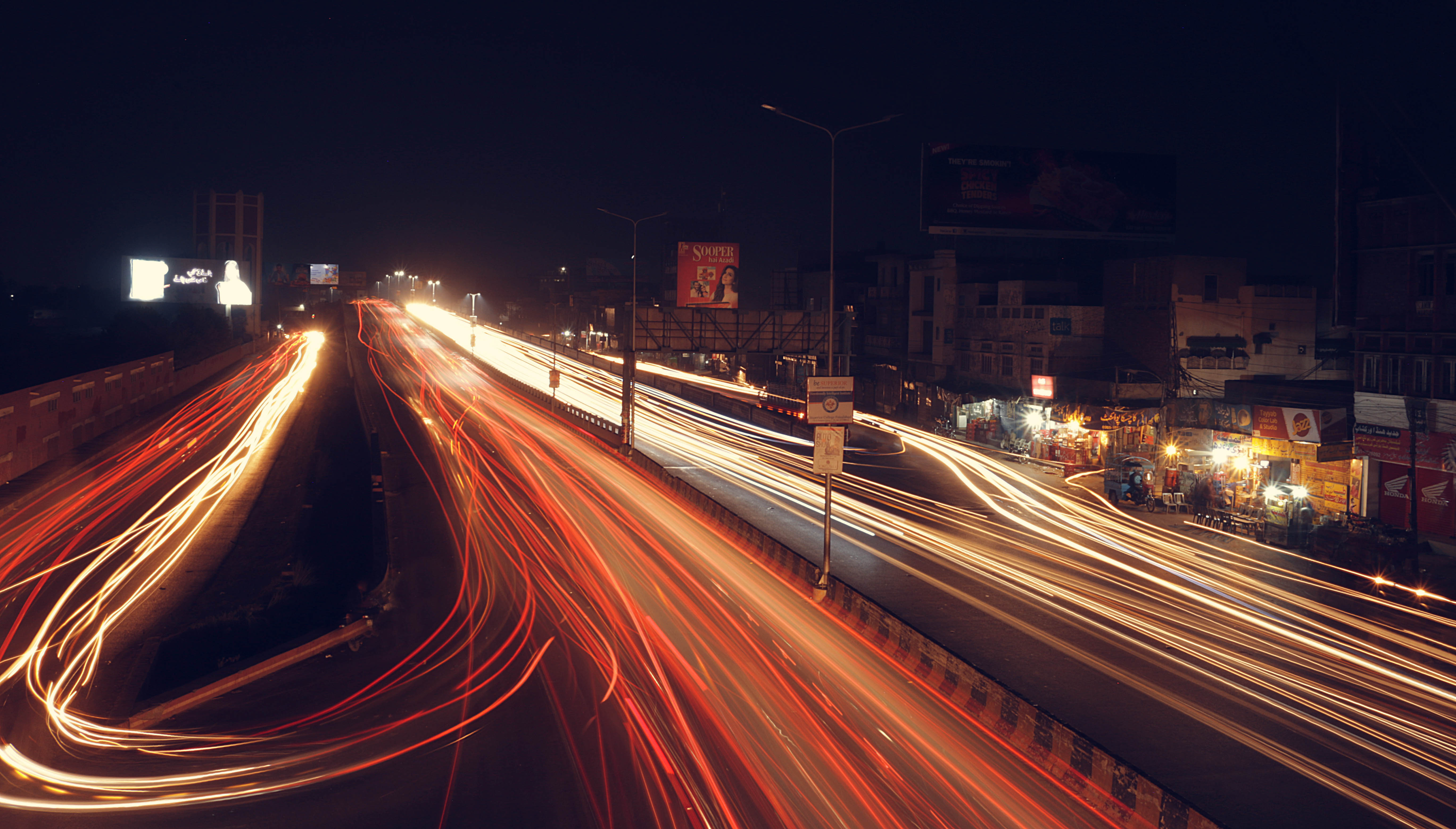

Location
- Abdullahpur Chowk, Faisalabad, Pakistan
- Roads at junction: Jaranwala Road; Jhumra Road; Mall Road; Rajbah Road; Sangla Hill Road

Construction
- Type: Flyover
- Lanes: 3 x 3

The Abdullahpur Flyover is a flyover built at Abdullahpur Chowk in Faisalabad, Punjab, Pakistan. It crosses over a road and railway track. The Rs. 850 million project was started in 2006, by Pervaiz Elahi, then Chief Minister of Punjab.

== Underpass ==
Abdullahpur Underpass is a road underpass in Abdullahpur Chowk. After the flyover was completed, the Government of Punjab is now constructing three underpasses at Abdullahpur Chowk, at a cost of Rs. 1.1 billion.
