= D Ground =

Commercial area of Faisalabad, Pakistan

D Ground ڈی گراؤنڈ
- Commercial Area
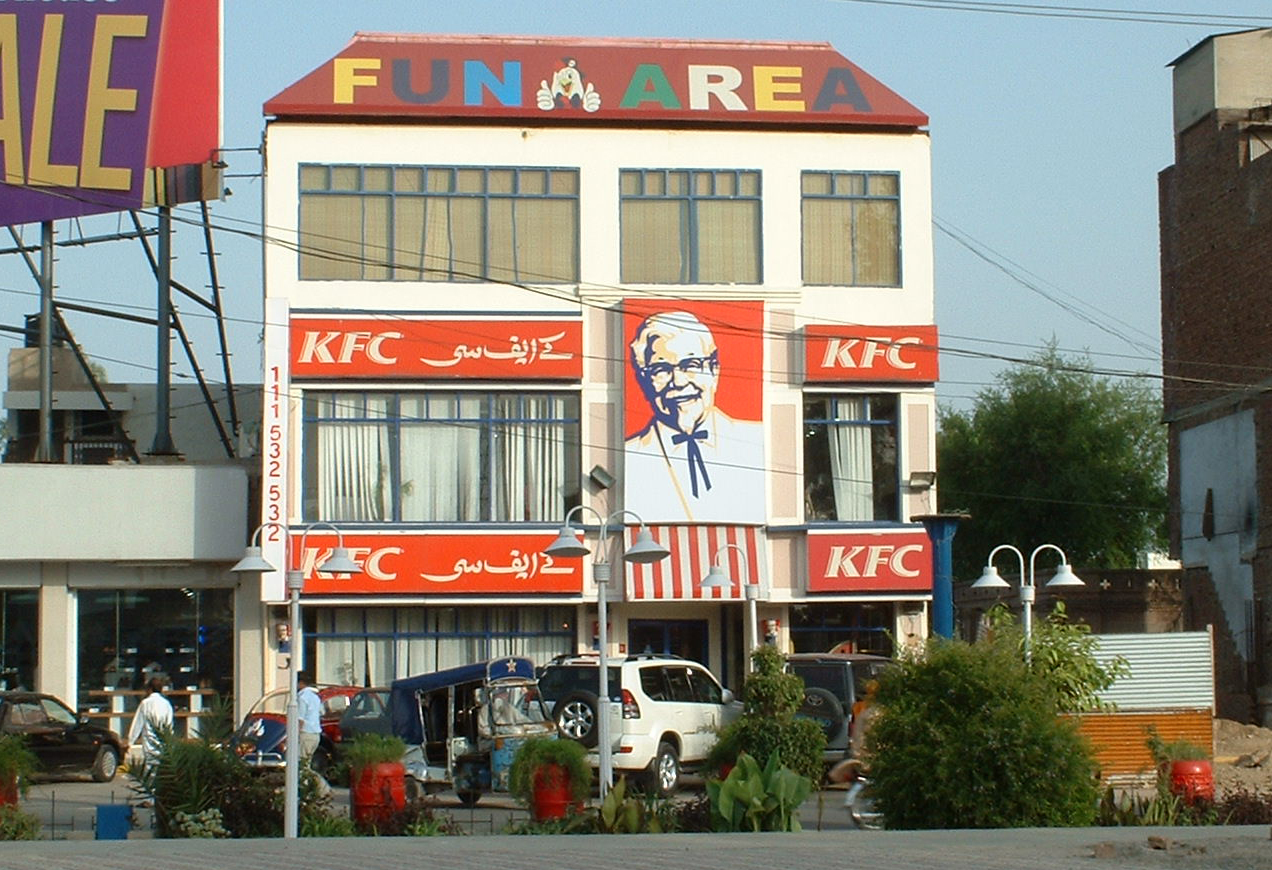
- KFC outlet in D Ground
- Interactive map of D Ground
- Coordinates: 31°24′24.24″N 73°6′26.64″E
- Country: Pakistan
- Province: Punjab
- City: Faisalabad

D Ground (Urdu: ڈی گراؤنڈ) is the main commercial area of Faisalabad, Punjab, Pakistan.

Originally developed shortly after independence as part of a broader urban expansion project, it currently serves as a center for shopping, dining and seasonal events, organized around a distinctive central open space.

== History ==
Conceived in the mid-1950s by the Government of West Pakistan, the area was developed to meet the city's rapidly growing housing needs due to an immense influx of muhajirs from East Punjab following the partition of India. To accommodate the growing population, the government converted barren land 5 km north-east of the city center into a modern residential neighborhood named People's Colony, with D Ground designed as its central marketplace. Today, D Ground is home to numerous branded retail stores and shopping malls, and is widely recognized as the hub of Faisalabad's contemporary fashion and culinary industries.

== Commerce and Culture ==
During Ramadan, as well as ahead of Eid al-Fitr and Eid al-Adha, local merchants and traders establish a large, temporary Eid market in the area.

== Layout and Landmarks ==
The hollow, D-shaped ground at the center of the market is divided into two halves; one half is occupied by the Radio Pakistan Faisalabad station, while the other serves as a green space.
