= Narma (tribe) =

The Narma are a tribe found in Bagh District of Azad Kashmir, Pakistan.
