= Clock Tower, Faisalabad =

Clock tower monument in Faisalabad, Pakistan

Faisalabad Clock Tower
- فیصل آباد کلاک ٹاور
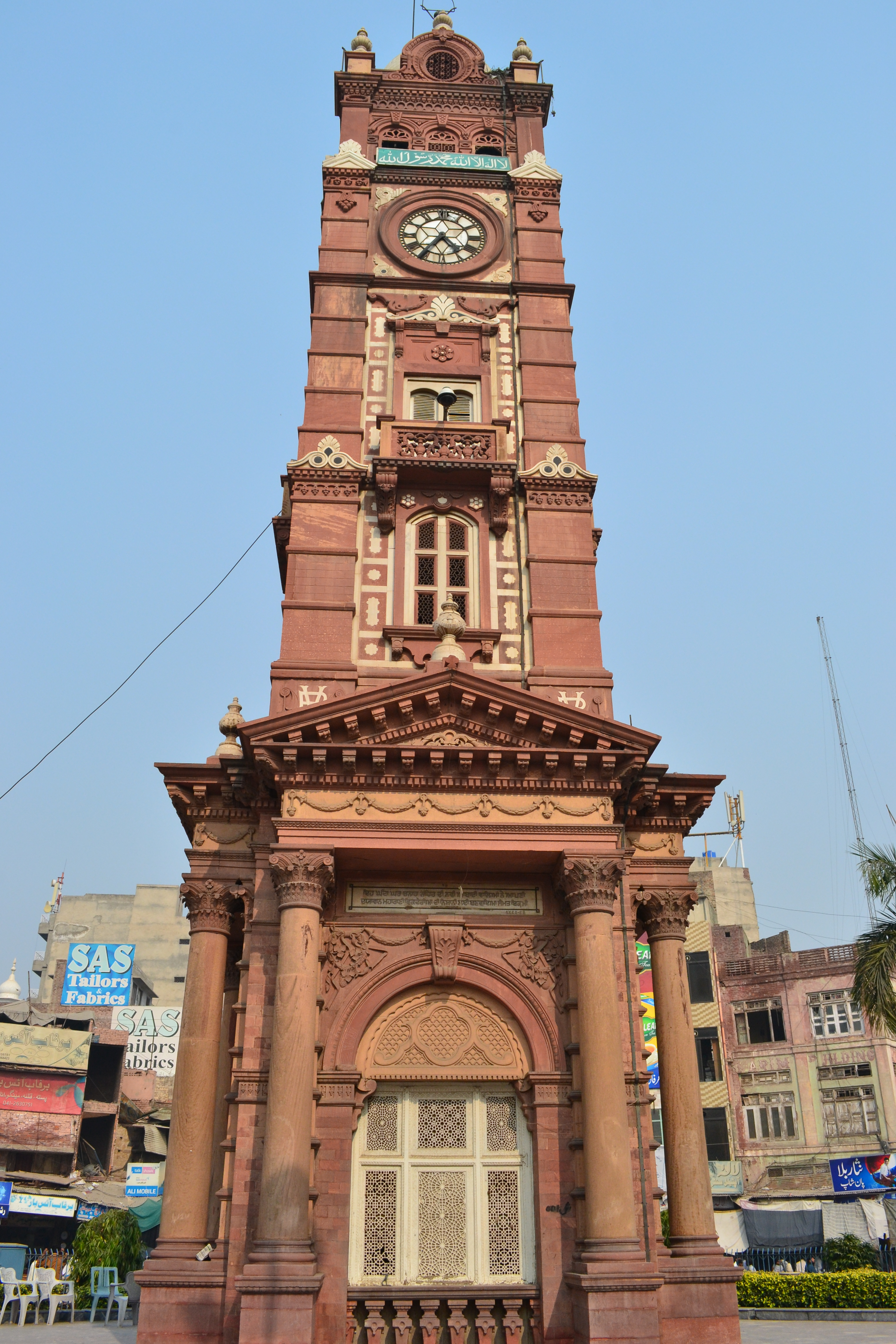
- A close view of the clock tower in 2012
- Interactive map of Faisalabad Clock Tower
- Location: Faisalabad, Punjab, Pakistan
- Coordinates: 31°25′07.22″N 73°04′44.90″E
- Type: Indo-Saracenic Revival architecture
- Completion date: 14 November 1905

The Faisalabad Clock Tower (Punjabi, Urdu: فیصل آباد کلاک ٹاور), formerly known as the Lyallpur Clock Tower, is a clock tower in Faisalabad, Punjab, Pakistan. Built in 1905, it is one of the city's oldest monuments still standing in its original state.

== History ==
The decision to build the clock tower on this spot was made by the then Jhang deputy commissioner Sir James Lyall. The foundation of the majestic Clock Tower was laid on 14 November 1905 by the British lieutenant governor of Punjab Sir Charles Montgomery Rivaz. A water well formerly existed at the exact location of the Clock Tower which was filled with earth. The red sandstone used in its construction was brought from Sangla Hill Tehsil, about 50 kilometres away.The fund was collected at a rate of Rs. 18 per square of land. The fund thus raised was handed over to the Municipal Committee which undertook to complete the project. It took two years to complete the construction at a cost of Rs. 40,000.

The leading architect of that era, Sir Ganga Ram designed the main architecture of the city. This city was designed basically as an agricultural market. This city was established after cleaning the shrub forests of the Sandal Bar. A new irrigation system mainly comprising the canal irrigation system was established here. People from all over the Punjab migrated here and they were allotted fertile lands for cultivation. The city started establishing itself at an enormous rate. An agricultural school was set up here in 1905, which later became a college and then a university famously known as the University of Agriculture.

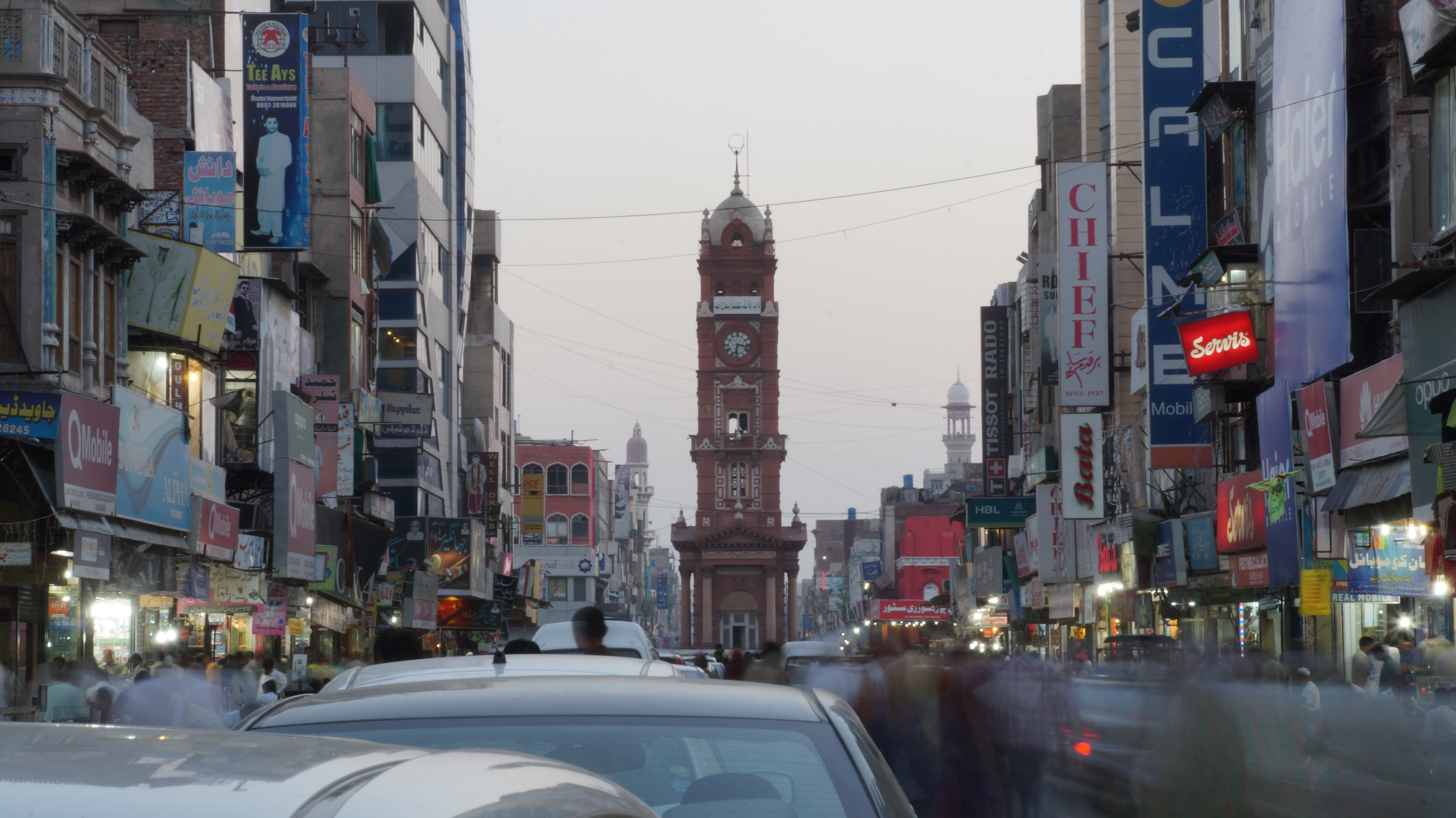
Ghanta Ghar bazaar is made up of eight bazaars, where local grown produce is bought and sold.

The locals refer to it as "Ghanta Ghar" (Urdu: گھنٹہ گھر) which translates into Hour House in English. It is located in the older part of the city. The clock is placed at the centre of the eight markets that, from a bird's-eye view, look like the Union Jack flag of the United Kingdom. This special layout still exists today and can be viewed using the latest software from Google Maps. The eight markets (bazaars) each has unique product types for sale. The bazaars are named for the directions these open towards i.e. Katchery bazaar, Chiniot bazaar, Aminpur bazaar, Bhawana Bazaar, Jhang Bazaar, Montgomery bazaar, Karkhana bazaar and Rail bazaar. All these eight bazaars are also connected with each other through another round-shaped bazaar, which is called 'Gole Bazaar'.

During festivals of Eid and Independence Day of Pakistan, the nazim of Faisalabad delivers a speech at this site and hangs the flag at full mast.

== Significance in the History of Faisalabad ==
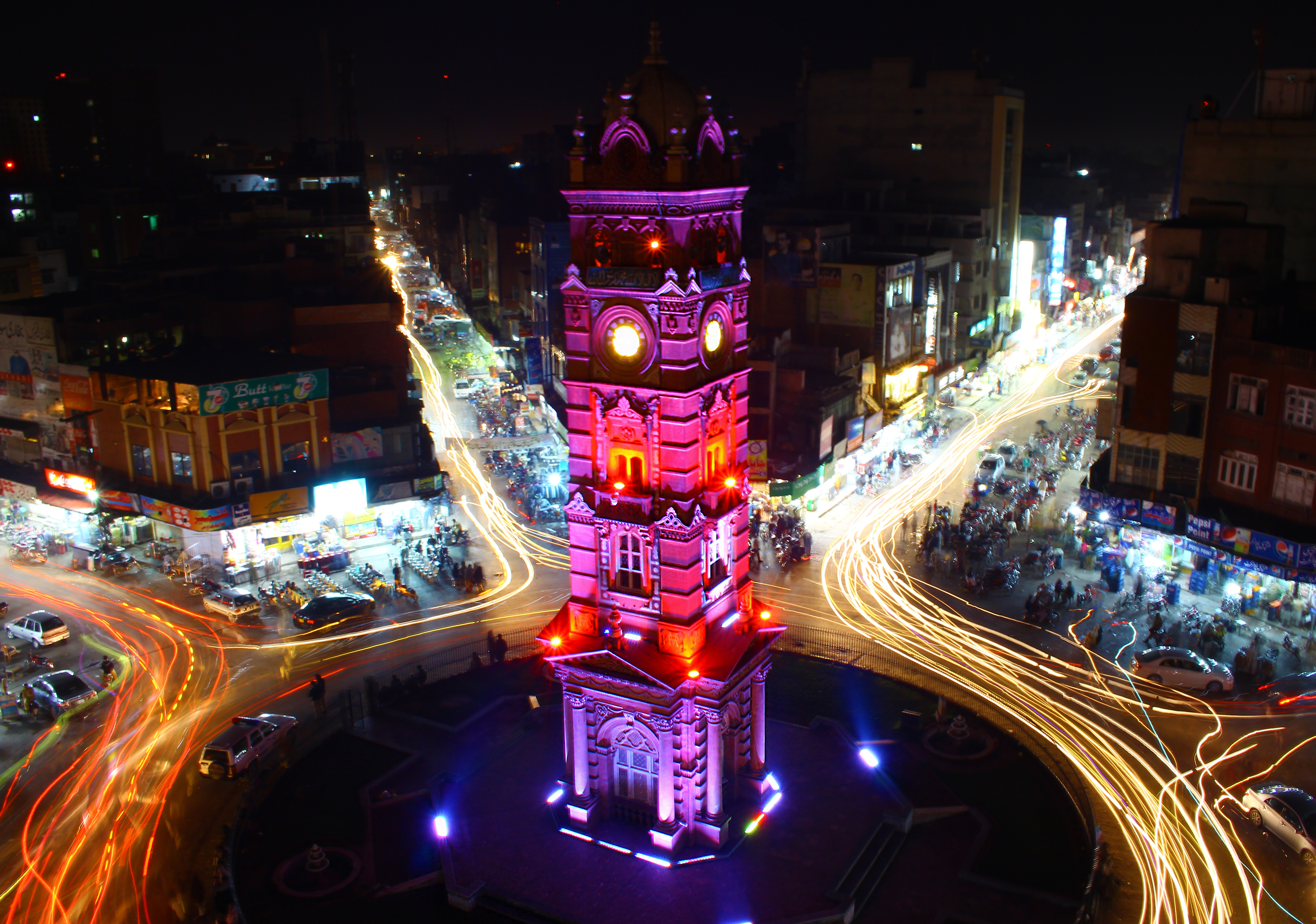
A view of clock tower during night

Clock Tower or Ghanta Ghar is the most recognised building of Faisalabad. It is not only in the centre of the city, it is also the centre of all the activities that happen in the city.

It is a popular location for political parties to stage ralies during elections, and for political demonstrations to be held. The central rally of Juloos-e-Muhammadi religious festival and the biggest procession of Muharram (annual religious event) is also held at Ghanta Ghar each year.

The importance of this iconic tower is so much that one of the leading Pakistani judges of the 1960s, Muhammad Rustam Kayani famously drew a parallel between the presidential system of President Ayub Khan and this clock tower because like Ghanta Ghar which is visible throughout the city, the presidential system of President Ayub made him of equal prominence.

== See also ==
- List of clock towers in Pakistan
- List of tallest buildings in Pakistan
- Lahore
