= FDA (disambiguation) =

FDA is the Food and Drug Administration, a federal agency of the United States Department of Health and Human Services.

FDA may also refer to:

== Law ==
- Flag Desecration Amendment, a proposed amendment to the United States Constitution
- Food and Drugs Act, Canada

== Science and technology ==
- Forensic data analysis, a branch of digital forensics
- Fully differential amplifier, a DC-coupled high-gain electronic voltage amplifier with differential inputs and outputs
- Functional data analysis, a branch of statistics
- Fluorescein diacetate, a non-fluorescent substrate; see Fluorescein diacetate hydrolysis

== Other uses ==
- FDA (trade union), a British trade union
- Angolan Democratic Forum (Portuguese: Fórum Democrático Angolano), a former political party
- Faisalabad Development Authority, Pakistan
- Florida Dental Association, United States
- Foundation Degree in the Arts, one of the foundation level qualifications in higher education in the United Kingdom
- Front Deutscher Äpfel (FDÄ), a German parody movement
- Fuji Dream Airlines, a Japanese airline
- Ferrari Driver Academy, a program by Scuderia Ferrari to promote young talents

== See also ==
- Food and Drug Administration (disambiguation)
