= Munianwala, Faisalabad =

Village in Punjab, Pakistan

Munianwala منیاں والا Muniānwāla
- Village
- Location in Punjab Location in Pakistan
- Coordinates: 31.4817°N 73.1925°E
- Country: Pakistan
- Province: Punjab
- Division: Faisalabad Division
- District: Faisalabad District
- Tehsil: Faisalabad Sadar Tehsil
- Time zone: UTC+5 (PST)
- Postal code: 37621

Munianwala, (Punjabi, Urdu: منیاں والا), also designated as Chak 198 RB, is a village and residential locality situated in Faisalabad, Punjab, Pakistan.

== History ==
=== Pre-Colonial Period ===
During the period of Mughal and Sikh rule, western Punjab was considerably less densely populated than its eastern counterpart. Eastern Punjab functioned as a centre of trade and commerce, anchored by established urban centres such as Lahore, Amritsar, and Ludhiana. The Rachna Doab, the tract of land lying between the Ravi and Chenab rivers, consisted predominantly of scattered small settlements alongside a limited number of towns, including Gujranwala. Much of the region's sparse population comprised nomadic pastoralists engaged in seasonal grazing.

=== British Colonial Period and Establishment ===
Following the conclusion of the Second Anglo-Sikh War (1848–49), the Punjab was annexed by the East India Company and incorporated into British India. Beginning in the 1880s, the colonial administration undertook a series of large-scale irrigation projects across Punjab Province, establishing a network of canal colonies intended to bring extensive tracts of western Punjab under cultivation. These projects precipitated a substantial demographic expansion in the region. As part of this initiative, Lyallpur, present-day Faisalabad, was founded as the administrative headquarters of the Chenab Canal Colony, planned as an organised settlement and developed into a significant agricultural centre with rail connections to the wider region. Munianwala was established as a village in the vicinity of Lyallpur during this period.

=== Partition and Post-Independence Development ===
Upon the independence of Pakistan and the subsequent partition of Punjab in 1947, Muslim refugees displaced from East Punjab, particularly from the Hoshiarpur district, migrated to the Faisalabad region and settled in Munianwala, reconstituting their communities in the aftermath of partition.

Following independence, Munianwala expanded progressively as a residential locality on the periphery of Faisalabad. The settlement developed to encompass over 250 commercial establishments, along with expanded infrastructure in the areas of education, healthcare, and transportation. The Faisalabad Development Authority has subsequently introduced several residential development schemes in Munianwala to accommodate the locality's continued growth.

== Infrastructure ==
=== Healthcare ===
Munianwala houses a basic health unit to offer healthcare services to residents.

=== Education ===
Munianwala contains the Government High School Chak 198 RB for boys' education. Munianwala also contains the Government Girls High School Chak 198 RB for girls' education.

== See also ==
- Faisalabad
- List of tehsils of Punjab, Pakistan
- History of Punjab
