= List of people from Faisalabad =

List of people who are known for their association with Faisalabad, Pakistan

Below is a list of people who are known for their association with Faisalabad, Pakistan. It does not necessarily mean that they were born in the city or were even nationals of the country.

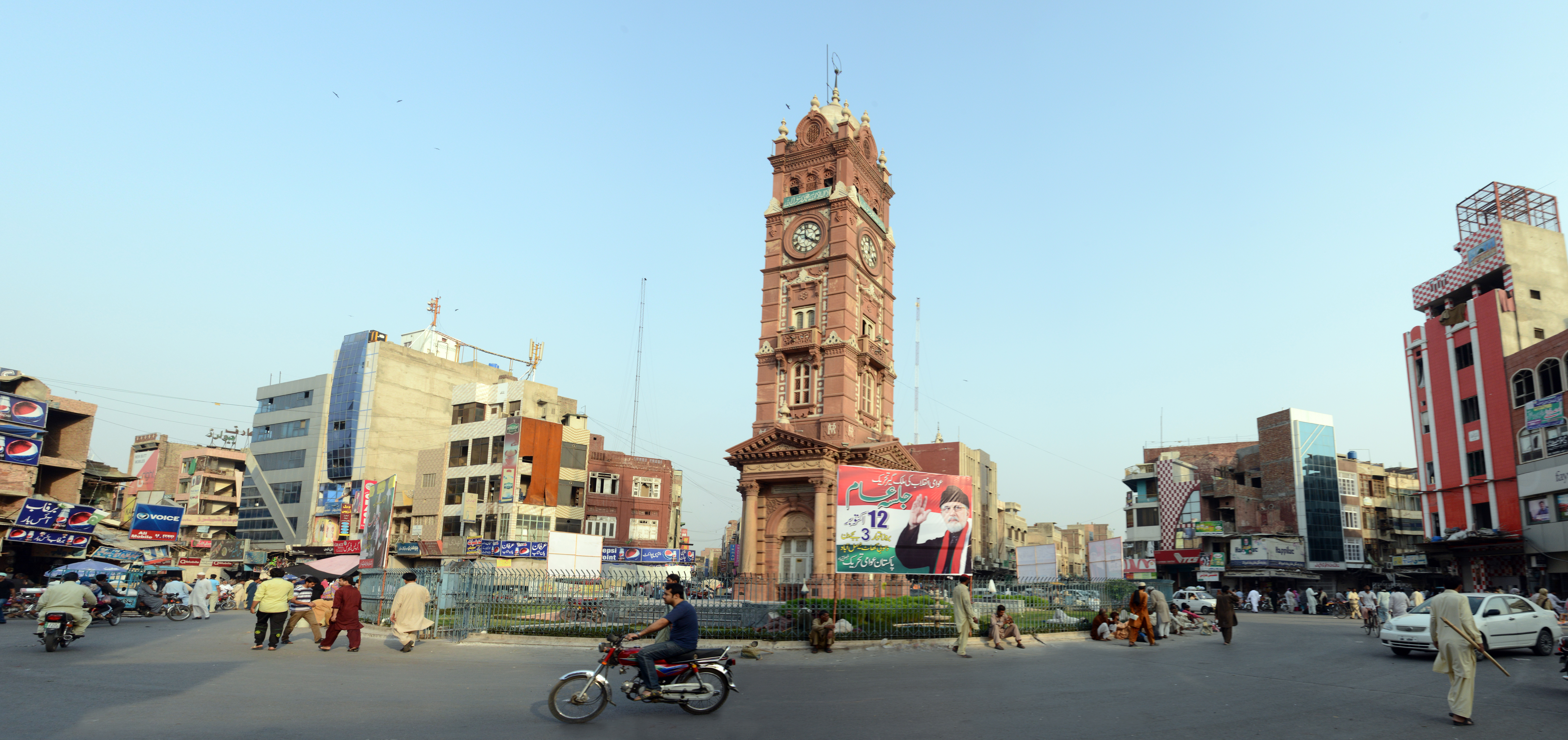
Clocktower Faisalabad

== List ==
- Amjad Saqib, Pakistani social entrepreneur, development practitioner, author and a former civil servant
- Varun Grover, Indian filmmaker, writer, lyricist and stand-up comedian.
- Rufin Anthony, Roman Catholic priest and bishop
- Teji Bachchan, Indian social activist and the late mother of Amitabh Bachchan
- Hari Singh Dilbar, Indian writer and poet in the Punjabi language
- Jassi Lailpuria, Pakistani singer
- Naqsh Lyallpuri, pen name of Jaswant Rai Sharma, Indian ghazal and Bollywood film lyricist
- Abrar Ul Haq, Pakistani musician
- Dildar Hussain, tabla player
- Lal Chand Yamla Jatt, Indian folk singer
- John Joseph, Roman Catholic priest and bishop
- Prithviraj Kapoor, Indian actor, director, producer
- Arfa Karim, computer prodigy
- Muhammad Fazal Karim, Pakistani politician of Sunni Ittehad Council
- Farrukh Fateh Ali Khan, Qawwali and ghazal singer
- Fateh Ali Khan, Qawwali singer
- Iqrar Ahmad Khan, agricultural scientist
- Nusrat Fateh Ali Khan, Qawwali singer
- Rahat Fateh Ali Khan, Qawwali singer
- Naz Khialvi, lyricist, poet and radio broadcaster
- Master Sunder Singh Lyallpuri, Indian independence movement leader, educationist and journalist
- Mala, ghazal and playback singer
- Khalid Maqbool, lieutenant general and politician
- Zia Mohyeddin, artist, actor
- Ifti Nasim, poet
- S. D. Narang, filmmaker, actor and author
- Mohsin Nawaz, long range shooter
- Hassan Nisar, columnist and writer
- Swarn Noora, Indian Sufi singer; grandmother of the famous Sufi singing duo Nooran Sisters
- Resham, Pakistani film actress
- Abdul Rauf Rufi, Naat Khawan
- Arjan Singh, marshal and only officer of the Indian Air Force to be promoted to five-star rank
- Rai Ahmad Khan Kharal Freedom activist
- Bhagat Singh, Indian revolutionary socialist
- Grahanandan Singh, Indian field hockey player
- Tariq Teddy, television actor and stand-up comedian
- Nabeel Zafar, television actor and producer fame bulbulay
- Sakhawat Naz, television actor and stand-up comedian

=== Athletes ===
- Aqeel Ahmed, Pakistani cricketer
- Shahbaz Ahmed, Pakistani hockey player
- Saeed Ajmal, Pakistani cricketer
- Moeen Akhtar, Pakistani cricketer
- Naeem Akhtar, Pakistani cricketer
- Muhammad Asif, snooker player
- Shahid Nazir, Pakistani cricketer
- Asif Ali, Pakistani cricketer
- Wasim Haider, Pakistani cricketer
- Mohammad Talha, Pakistani cricketer
- Misbah-ul-Haq, Pakistani cricketer

=== Politicians ===
- Rana Asif Tauseef, politician
- Rana Zahid Tauseef, politician
- Rana Sanaullah Khan, politician
- Malik Muhammad Nawaz, politician
- Chaudhry Abid Sher Ali, politician
- Muhammad Saleem Bajawa, politician
- Shahbaz Bhatti, politician
- Khawaja Muhammad Islam, politician
- Chaudhry Muhammad Afzal Sahi, politician
- Ghulam Rasool Sahi, politician
- Madan Lal Khurana, Former Chief Minister of Delhi
- Jagjit Singh Lyallpuri, politician of the Communist Part of India
- Sunder Singh Lyallpuri, politician and Indian independence activist

=== Religious scholars ===
- Muhammad Ishaq Bhatti, Islamic scholar, and historian
