= Allied Hospital =

Hospital in Faisalabad, Pakistan

Allied Hospital الائیڈ سپتال
- Government of Punjab
- Allied Hospital Faisalabad

Geography
- Location: Jail Road Sidhupura, Faisalabad, Punjab, Pakistan
- Coordinates: 31°26′55″N 73°4′51″E

Organisation
- Care system: Ministry of National Health Services
- Type: Teaching, General, District General
- Affiliated university: Punjab Medical College
- Patron: Dr Mian Faheem Yousaf

Services
- Emergency department: Yes
- Beds: 1450

Helipads
- Helipad: No

History
- Founded: 1978

Links
- Lists: Hospitals in Pakistan

Allied Hospital (Urdu: الائیڈ سپتال) is the leading government-run hospital in the district of Faisalabad, Pakistan. Allied Hospital serves as the teaching hospital of Faisalabad Medical University (Punjab Medical College). It was founded in 1978.

Allied Hospital serves the wider Faisalabad District. During the covid-19 pandemic, Allied Hospital was the leading point of contact for treatment and vaccination.

== History ==
Allied Hospital was founded in 1978 with a capacity of 1,450 beds. It was equipped with state of the art machinery. The Government of Punjab granted autonomy to this institution in 1998 and a Board of Governors was empowered to run the institution. In 2002, Government of Punjab revised the act. Emergency departments have been setup at DHQ Hospital and Allied Hospital and free medication is provided to all patients for the first 24 hours.

== Recognition ==
The institute is recognized by General Medical Council, United Kingdom and Irish Medical Council, Republic of Ireland. In addition, it's also recognized by the College of Physicians and Surgeons Pakistan.

== Departments ==
Here is a list of departments within Allied Hospital.

1. General Medicine
2. General Surgery
3. Neurosurgery
4. Peadriatics
5. Cardiology/ CCU
6. Ear, Nose and Throat (ENT)
7. Ophthalmology/ Eye
8. Dermatology (Skin)
9. Obstetrics & Gynaecology
10. Cardiac Surgery
11. Pulmonology/ T.B. & Chest
12. Accident and Emergency Department
13. Labour Room
14. Trauma Center
15. Orthopaedic Ward
16. Oncology
17. Psychiatry
18. Radiotherapy
19. Anaesthesia/ Intensive Care Unit (ICU)
20. Plastic Surgery
21. Urology
22. Burn Center (State of art)
23. Private Rooms
24. Nephrology
25. Diabetic Center
26. COVID-19 ward
27. Mortuary and Postmortem

== Capacity ==
Allied Hospital has:

- 3 Surgical Units
- 3 Medical Units
- 1 Cardiology Unit
- 2 ENT Units with Facio maxillary surgery
- Dental Surgery
- 1 Pediatric Medicine
- 1 Pediatric Surgery Unit
- 1 Gynaecology and Obstetrics Units
- 1 Labour Unit with separate operation theatre
- ICU and recovery room
- 1 Radiology Unit
- 1 Oncology Unit
- 1 Nephrology Unit with dialysis treatment facility
- 1 Urology Unit with Kidney transplant facilities
- 1 Plastic Surgery and Burn Unit
- 1 Orthopedics Unit
- 1 Ophthalmology Unit
- 1 Neurosurgery Unit

Allied Hospital has separate operation theatres for ENT, Orthopedics, General Surgery, Ophthalmology, Urology, Plastic Surgery and Neurosurgery. All these subspecialties give 24 hour emergency cover. Surgery Department is run by Professor Grade Doctors who are highly qualified in their fields.

Allied Hospital Faisalabad contains a number of qualified doctors and teaching staff. It provides all facilities to its patients, has treatment available for many diseases, conditions and a dedicated burn center. The emergency ward is open 24 hours.

== Location ==
Allied Hospital Faisalabad is located on Jail Road adjacent to Faisalabad Medical University, near Sidhupura Sargodha Road.

== Covid-19 Ward ==
According to the Pakistan Medical Association (PMA) sources, the ease in lockdown by the authorities had led to an increase in the number of patients in Punjab, especially in Faisalabad in May 2020. So this hospital took required steps to deal with the changed situation.

== See also ==
- DHQ Hospital, Faisalabad
- Shifa International Hospital, Faisalabad
- List of hospitals in Pakistan
