= DHQ Hospital Faisalabad =

Pakistani hospital

DHQ Hospital, Faisalabad

Geography
- Location: Faisalabad City, Faisalabad, Punjab, Pakistan
- Coordinates: 31°25′15″N 73°5′40″E

Organisation
- Type: Teaching, District, General
- Affiliated university: Faisalabad Medical University
- Network: Government Funded and Managed

Services
- Emergency department: Yes
- Beds: 570

Helipads
- Helipad: No

History
- Founded: 1947

Links
- Lists: Hospitals in Pakistan

District Head Quarters (DHQ) Hospital is the second largest and oldest hospital in the city of Faisalabad. It is located on Mall Road near the Faisalabad Railway Station and Faisalabad GTS Bus stand.

DHQ Hospital serves as the secondary teaching hospital of Punjab Medical College.

== Location ==
DHQ Hospital Faisalabad is located on Mall Road across the street from Faisalabad Development Authority and in close proximity to the Faisalabad Railway Station.

== Services ==
DHQ Hospital Faisalabad contains a number of qualified doctors and teaching staff. It provides all facilities to its patients, has treatment available for many diseases, and a burn center. There is also an emergency ward open 24 hours.

1. Surgical Unit
2. Gynaecology Unit
3. Psychiatry Unit
4. Chest Disease Unit
5. Dermatology Unit
6. Ear, Nose and Throat (ENT) Unit
7. Pediatric Unit
8. Radiology Unit
9. Emergency Room (24 Hours)
10. Outpatient Department

== See also ==
- List of hospitals in Pakistan
