= Faisalabad =

City in Punjab, Pakistan

Faisalabad فیصل آباد
- Metropolis
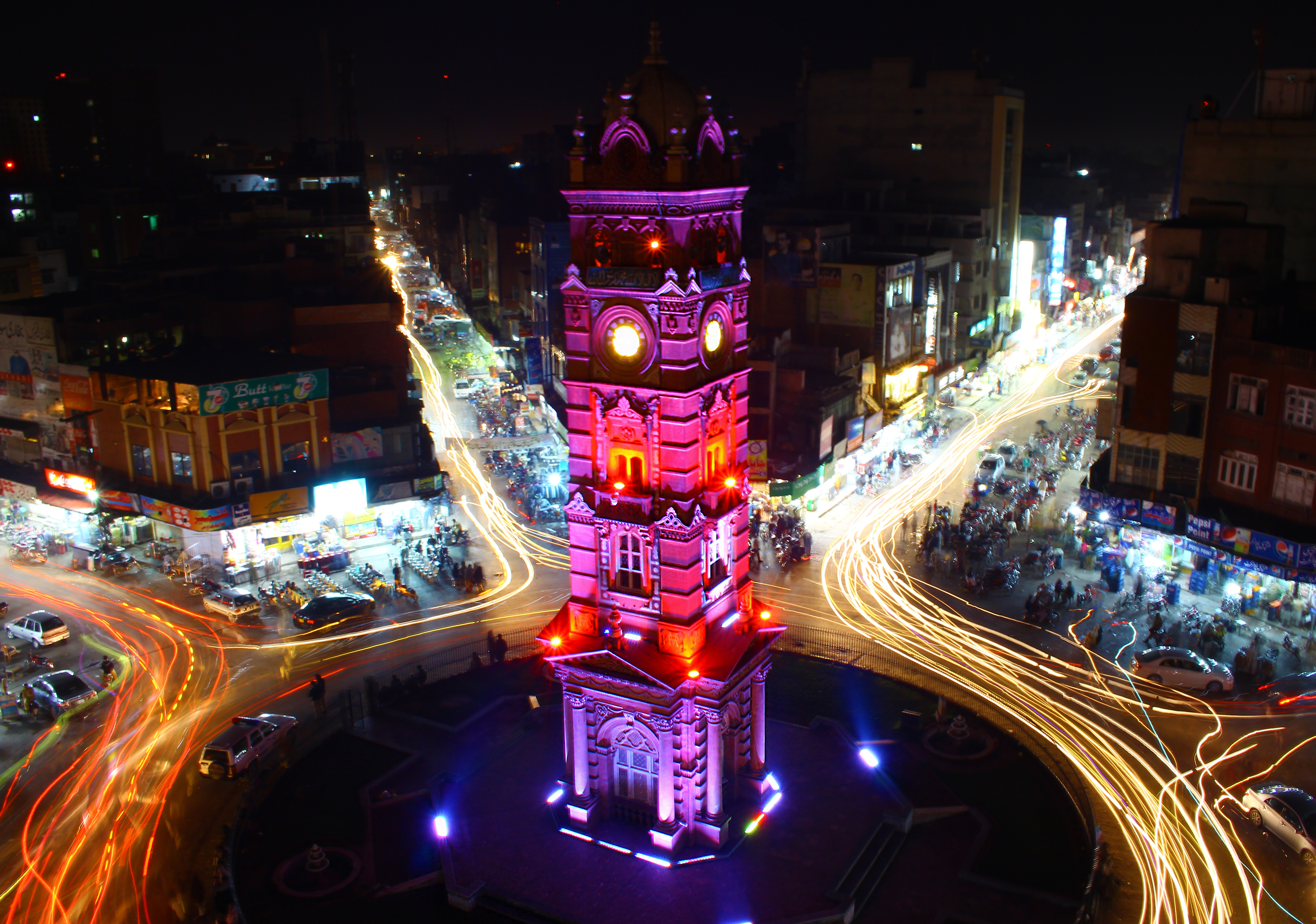
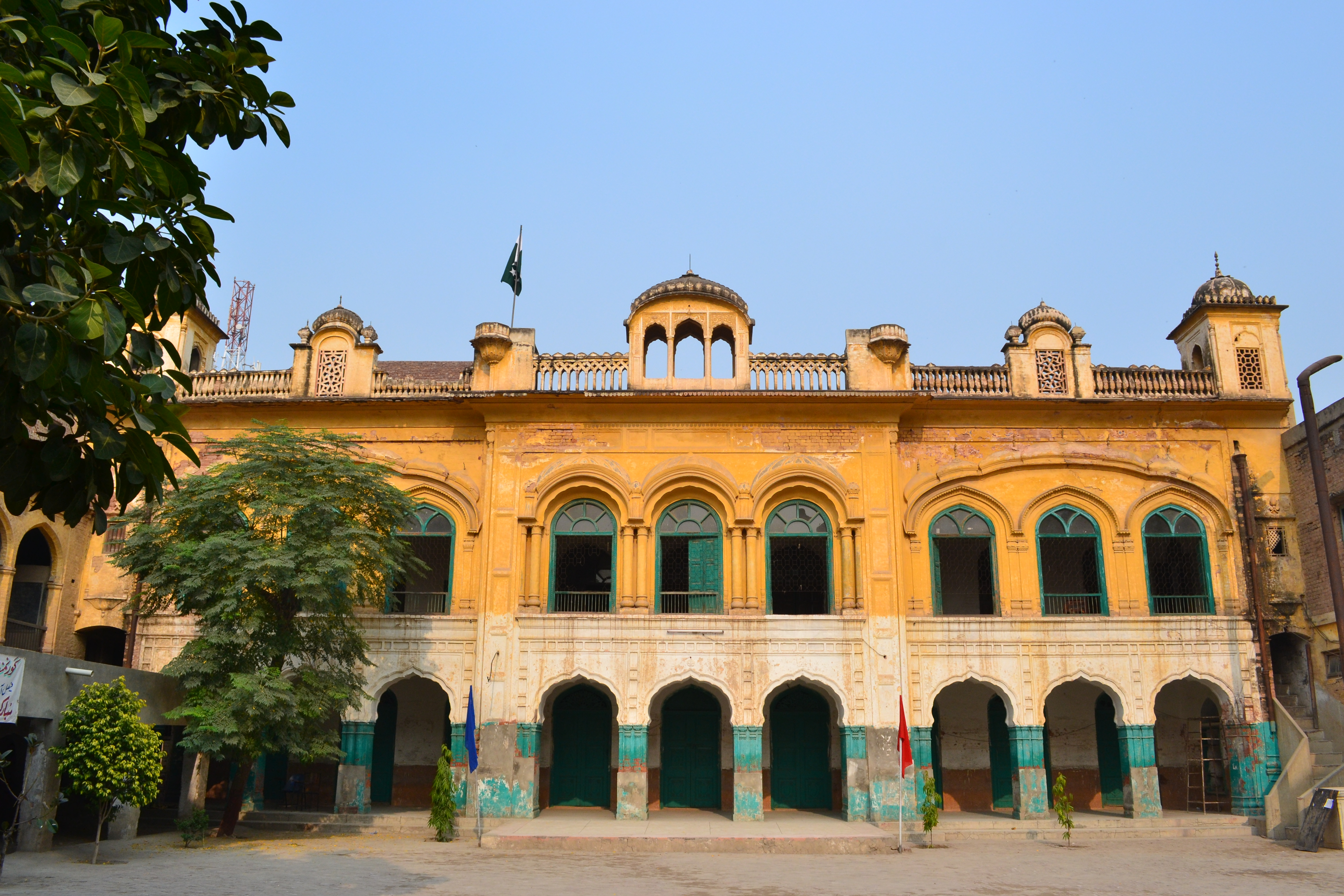
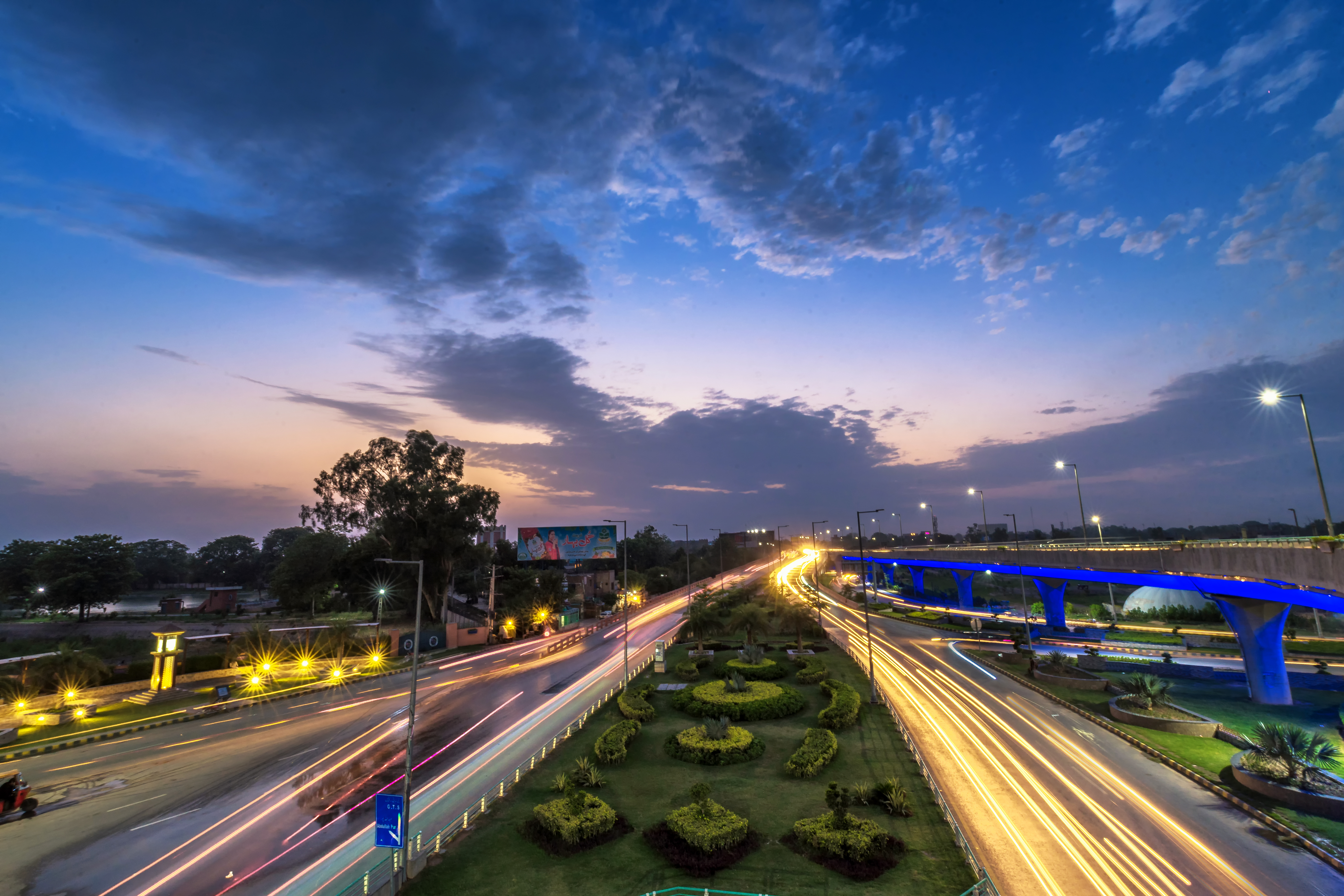
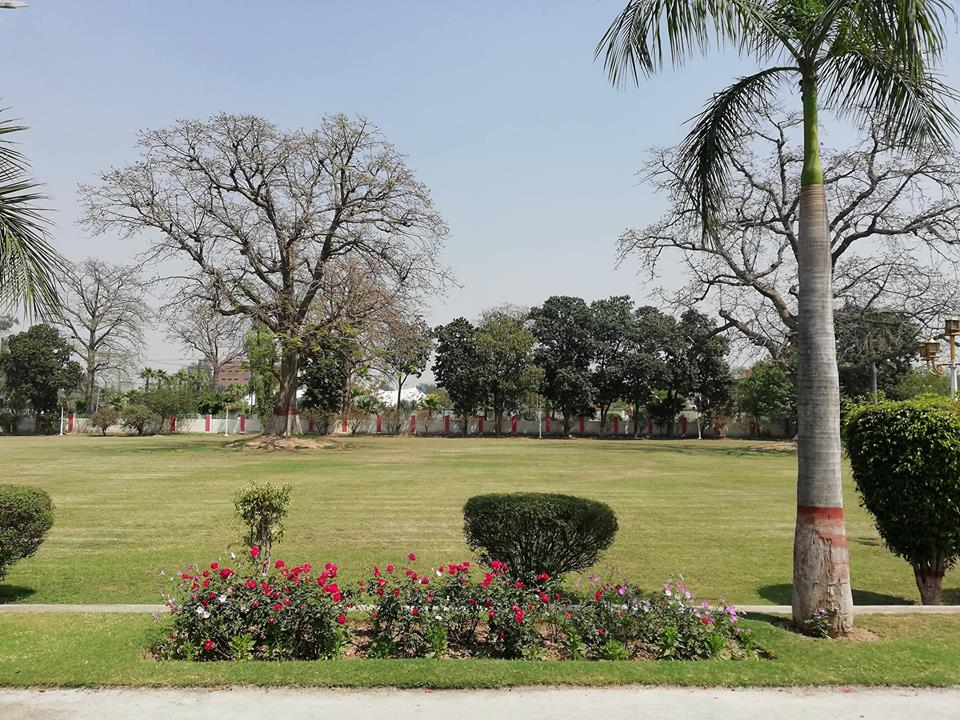
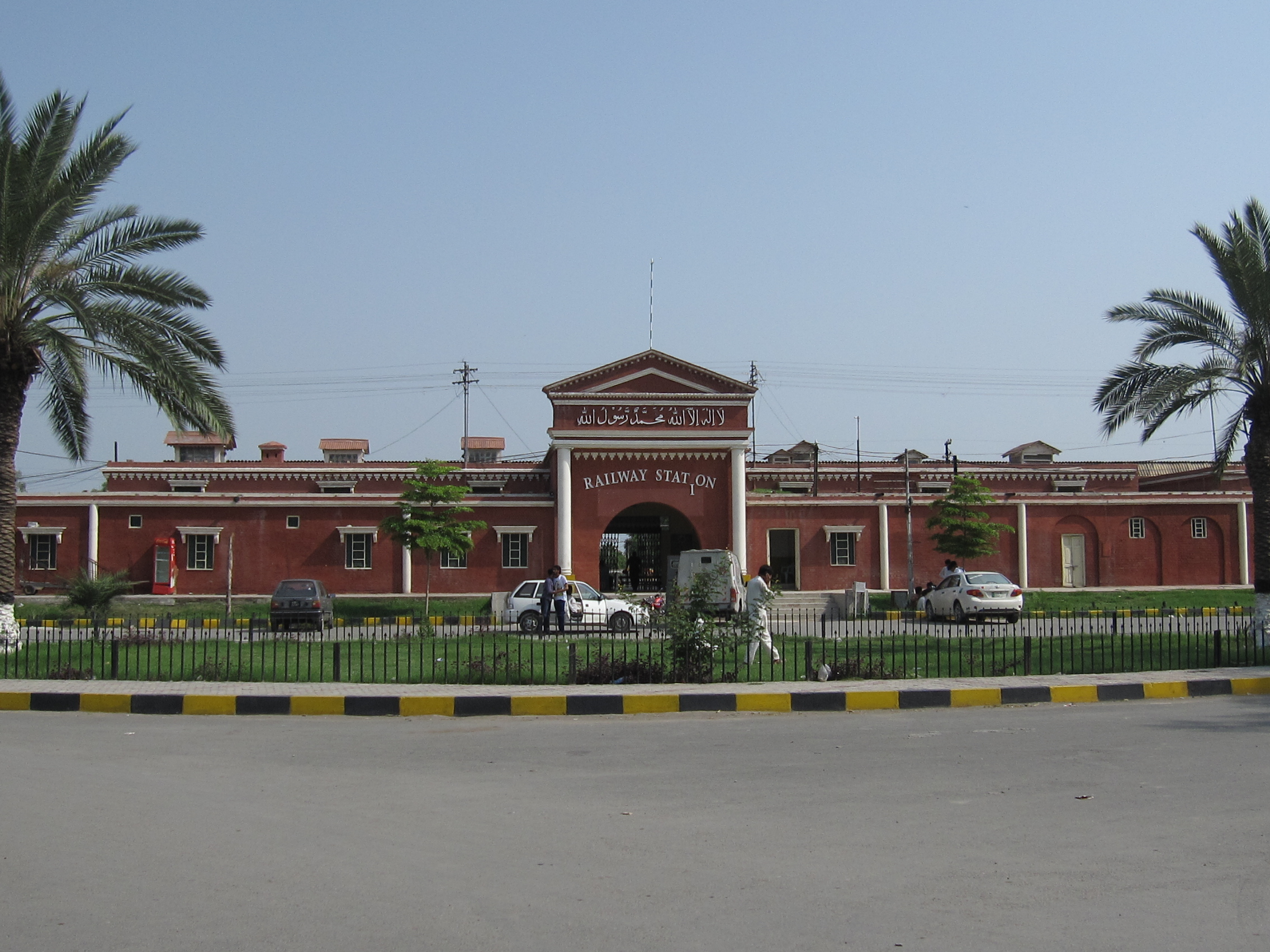
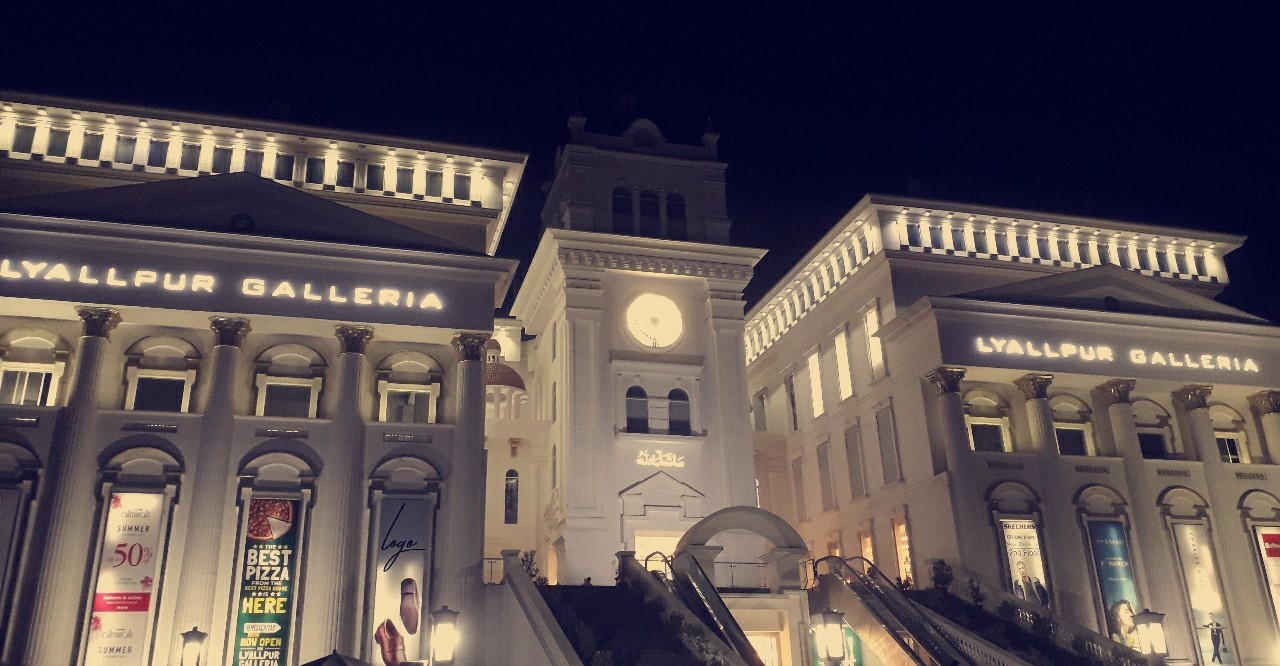
- Clock Tower Lyallpur Gurdwara Jhal Flyover Circuit House Gardens Faisalabad railway station Lyallpur Galleria

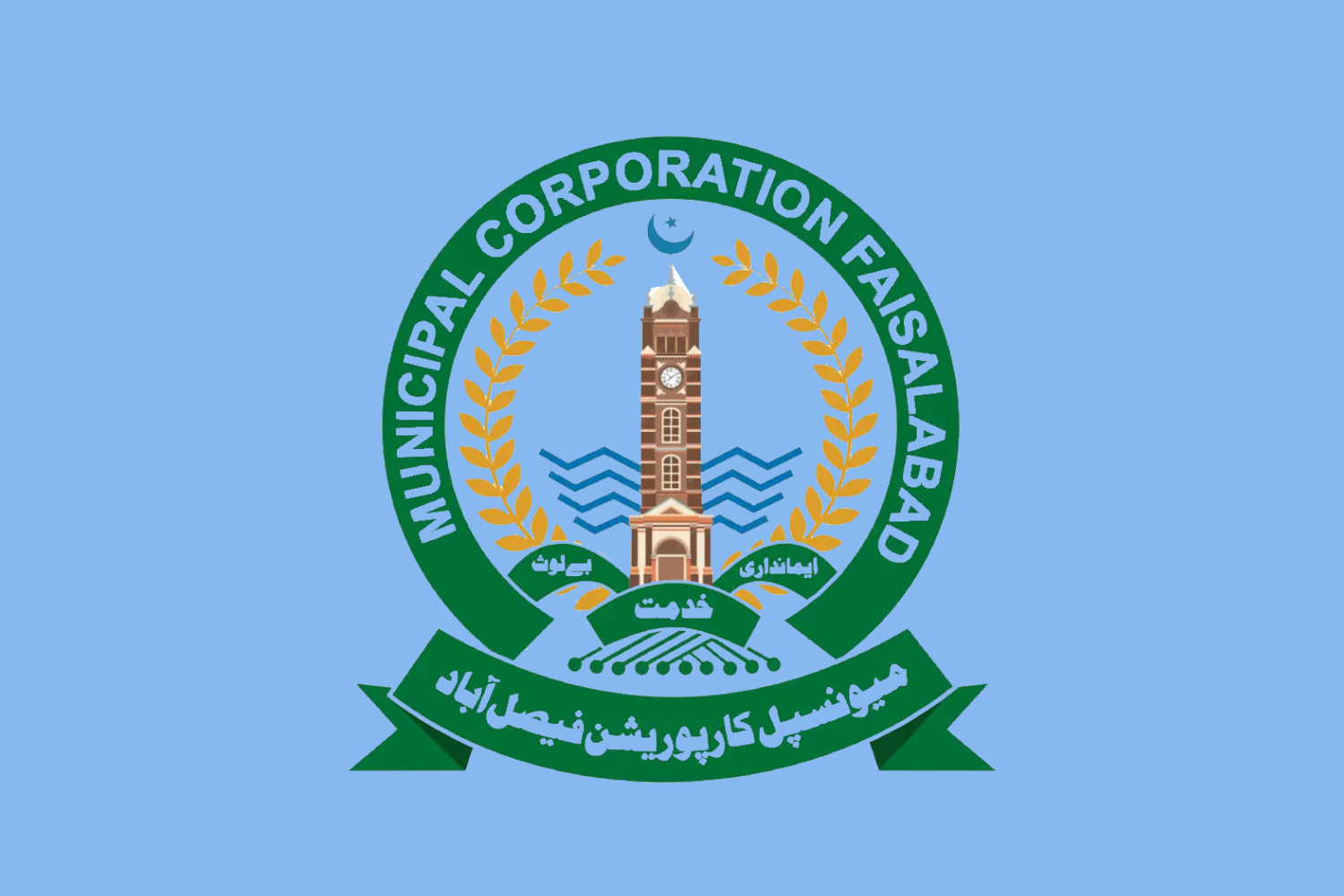
- Flag Seal
- Nickname: The Manchester of Pakistan
- Location of Faisalabad Faisalabad (Pakistan)
- Coordinates: 31°25′0″N 73°5′28″E
- Country: Pakistan
- Province: (Punjab, Pakistan) Punjab
- Division: Faisalabad
- District: Faisalabad
- Settled: 1890
- Founder: James Broadwood Lyall
- Named for: Faisal of Saudi Arabia

Government
  - Type: Municipal Corporation
  - Mayor: None
  - Deputy Commissioner: Nadeem Nasir

Area
  - City: 1,330 km^{2} (512 sq mi)
  - Land: 840 km^{2} (325 sq mi)
  - Water: 430 km^{2} (165 sq mi) 33%
- Elevation: 186 m (610 ft)

Population (2023)
  - City: 3,691,999 (Note: This figure includes the urban population of Faisalabad City Tehsil.)
  - Rank: 2nd in Punjab; 3rd in Pakistan
  - Density: 4,390/km^{2} (11,400/sq mi)
- Demonym: Faisalabadi

Languages
  - Official: Urdu; English
  - Native: Punjabi
- Time zone: UTC+05:00 (PKT)
- Postal code: 38000
- Area code: 041
- Former name: Lyallpur
- GDP: $43 billion (2013)
- Website: faisalabad.punjab.gov.pk

Faisalabad, (Note: /fɑːɪsɑːlˌbɑːd/; Punjabi, Urdu: فیصل آباد, Punjabi pronunciation: [fɛːsə̆ləˌbäːd]; Urdu pronunciation: [fɛːsˈlɑˌbɑːd]) formerly known as Lyallpur, (Note: Punjabi, Urdu: لائل پور) is the second-largest city and primary industrial center of the Pakistani province of Punjab. Located in the Rachna Doab of the central Punjab, it is the third-most populous city in Pakistan. Established in 1890s as a planned city, the population of the city increased six times in the decade following the partition of British India as hundreds of thousands of East Punjabi Muslim immigrants settled the city.

Historically one of the largest villages of Punjab, Lyallpur was one of the first planned cities within British India. It became headquarters of the lower Chenab Colony and in 1898 was incorporated as a municipality. It was restructured into city district status; a devolution promulgated by the 2001 local government ordinance (LGO). The city is the headquarters of the Faisalabad District the total area of which is around 5,856 km^{2} (2,261 sq mi) while the urban area controlled by the Faisalabad Development Authority (FDA) is around 1,300 km^{2} (500 sq mi).

Faisalabad has become a major industrial and distribution hub due to its centrally located infrastructure including connecting roads, rails, and air transportation. It has been referred to as the Manchester of Pakistan because of its extensive textile industry. In 2013, the GDP of Faisalabad was estimated at $43 billion. Faisalabad contributes over 20 percent to the GDP of the country and has an average annual GDP (nominal) of $20.5 billion. Agriculture and industry remain its hallmarks.

== Etymology ==
Faisalabad was formerly known as Lyallpur meaning Lyall's Town. When founded in 1890, it was named after Sir James Broadwood Lyall, the British lieutenant governor (1887–1892) of the Punjab. In 1979, the city of Lyallpur, with the Persian suffix -abad for inhabited place, was renamed Faisalabad by the Government of Pakistan in the name of King Faisal of Saudi Arabia (r. 1964–1975) and his kingdom's long relationship with Pakistan and its people.

== History ==
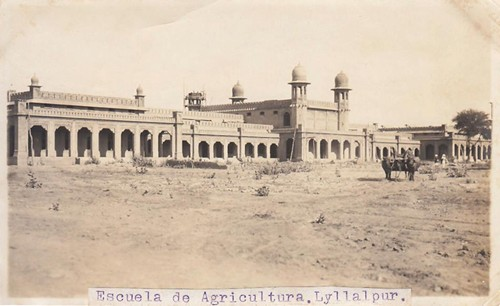
The first university in Lyallpur, Punjab Agricultural College and Research Institute (now University of Agriculture, Faisalabad), was built by the British Indian Empire in 1906, with the foundation stone laid by Sir Louis Dane, then Lieutenant and Governor of Punjab.

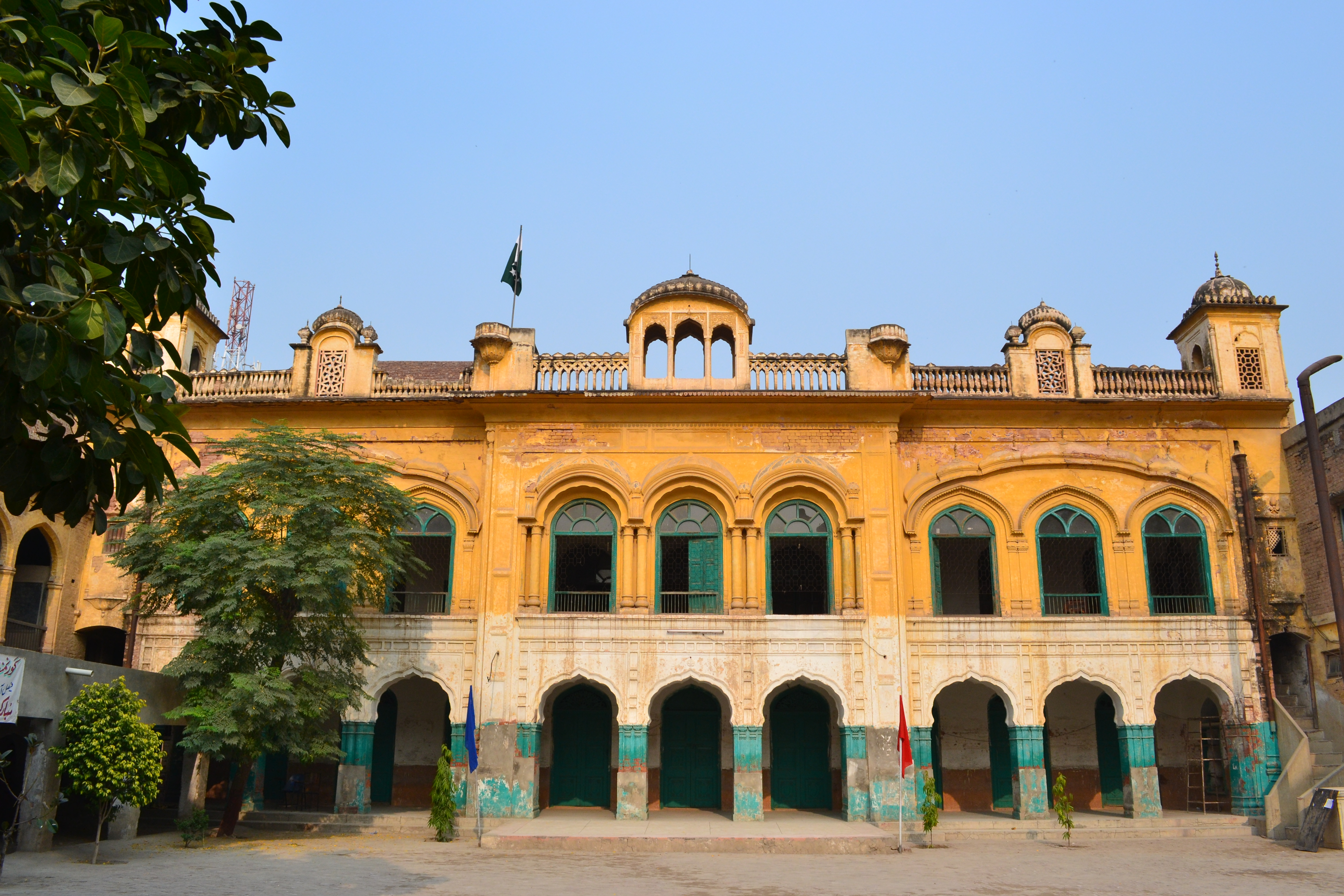
Gurudawar Layallpur, a Sikh Gurdwara constructed during the reign of the British Empire in 1911

=== Early settlements ===
The region encompassing modern-day Faisalabad district was originally inhabited by a number of forest-dwelling tribes. It is believed these early settlements belonged to the ancient districts of Jhang and Sandalbar, and included the area between Shahdara to Shorkot and Sangla Hill to Toba Tek Singh.

The city was settled or established in 1880 during the colonisation of the lower Chenab Valley. The city was settled down by Rai Bahadur Bhavanidas Sikka, after which the British Government granted jagirs to him. After the Partition, his descendants settled in India and now live in Mumbai. The city was named in honor of Lieutenant-Governor of the Punjab, Sir James Broadwood Lyall, for his role in establishing the canal colonisation project. The main architecture of the city was designed by architect Ganga Ram.

=== Development ===
At the conclusion of the Second Anglo-Sikh War in 1849, the entire Punjab region became administered as Punjab province, firstly by the East India Company and after 1858 as part of the British Raj.

In the 1880s, the Punjab government began an irrigation scheme to cultivate large tracts of western Punjab through the creation of canal colonies. The Chenab colony was the largest of these colonisation projects, and covered the entirety of the Lyallpur District. Popham Young, the colonisation officer, managing the project, identified the site of the current city to establish headquarters for the colony.

The centre of the city was built in a way to replicate the design in the Union Jack with eight roads extending from a large clock tower at its epicentre; a design geometrically symbolic of the Cross of Saint Andrew counter changed with the Cross of Saint Patrick, and Saint George's Cross over all. The eight roads developed into eight separate bazaars (markets) leading to different regions of the Punjab. In 1896, the newly constructed town with its growing agricultural surplus was added to the British rail network. Construction of the rail link between Wazirabad and Lyallpur was completed in 1895. In 1896, Gujranwala, Jhang and Montgomery comprising the tehsils of Lyallpur were under the administrative control of the Jhang District in Multan Division. The town became one of the first planned settlements within British India.

In 1904, the new district of Lyallpur was created in Multan Division to include the three tehsils; Lyallpur, Samundri and Toba Tek Singh. A sub-tehsil at Jaranwala later became a full tehsil in itself. The University of Agriculture, originally the Punjab Agricultural College and Research Institute, Lyallpur, was established in 1906. The Town Committee was upgraded to a Municipal Committee in 1909. Lyallpur grew into an established agricultural tool and grain center. By 1911, the city had a population of 19,578. A member of the Indian Civil Service (ICS), Malcolm Lyall Darling, who was the-then appointed as the assistant commissioner of the Punjab, travelled through the Lyallpur Colony area in 1920s considering it being a rich tract of land in the British India. The 1930s brought industrial growth and market expansion to the textile industry as well as to food processing, grain crushing, and chemicals.

=== Independence ===
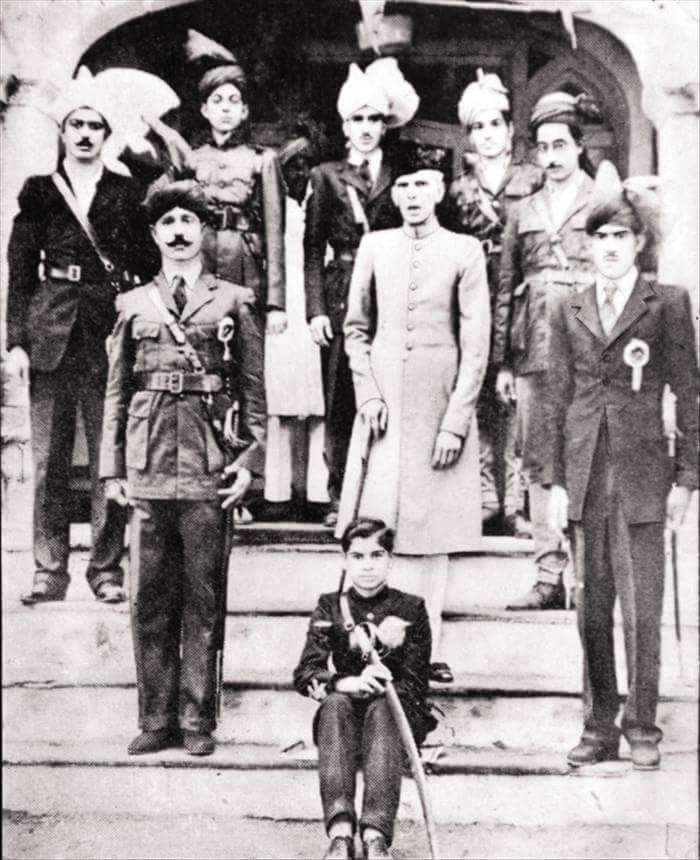
Mohammed Ali Jinnah, in Lyallpur, where he gave a historic speech at Dhobi Ghat, c. 1943

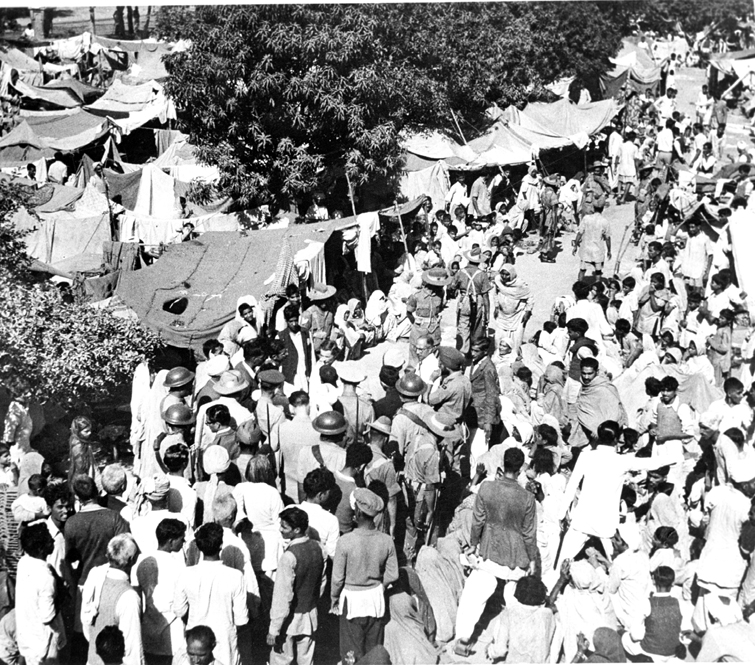
Lady Mountbatten, Vicereine of India, among the Hindu evacuees at the Punjab Scouts Camp, Layallpur, during the partition of British India

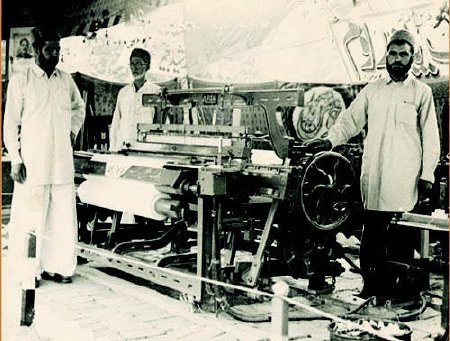
One of the earlier industrial exhibitions in Faisalabad, still a major exhibition in the city today, c. 1949

In August 1947, following three decades of nationalist struggles, India and Pakistan achieved independence. The British agreed to partition of British India into two sovereign states – Pakistan with a Muslim majority, and India with a Hindu majority. However, more Muslims remained in India than what governing authorities believed would assimilate into Pakistan. The partitioning led to a mass migration of an estimated 10 million people which made it the largest mass migration in human history. The Punjab province was divided into Punjab, West Pakistan and Punjab, India. There were also respective divisions of the British Indian Army, the Indian Civil Service, various administrative services, the central treasury, and the railways. Riots and local fighting followed the expeditious withdrawal of the British, resulting in an estimated one million civilians deaths, particularly in the western region of Punjab. Lyallpur, which was located in the region of the Punjab Province that became part of West Pakistan, was populated by a minority of Hindus and Sikhs who migrated to India, while Muslim refugees from East Punjab settled in the district.

In 1979, Pakistani authorities changed the name of the city from Lyallpur to Faisalabad, to honor the close friendship of King Faisal of Saudi Arabia with Pakistan.

During the 1980s, the city saw an influx of foreign investments in the textile sector. A large number of residents of Faisalabad began working abroad as bilateral ties improved as part of new trade agreements. This led to more foreign remittances into the city. This aided the development of large-scale infrastructure projects within the city. In 1982, the city district was upgraded as a division with the districts of Faisalabad, Jhang, and Toba Tek Singh. Currently, the division comprises four districts, the fourth being Chiniot District.

== Geography ==
=== Location ===
Faisalabad lies in the rolling flat plains of northeast Punjab, at 186 metres (610 ft) above sea level. The city proper comprises approximately 1,326 square kilometres (512 sq mi) while the district encompasses more than 16,000 square kilometres (6,200 sq mi). The Chenab River flows about 30 kilometres (19 mi), and the Ravi River meanders 40 kilometres (25 mi) to the southeast. The lower Chenab canal provides water to 80% of cultivated lands making it the main source of irrigation. Faisalabad is bound on the north by Chiniot and Sheikhupura, on the east by Sheikhupura and Sahiwal, on the south by Sahiwal and Toba Tek Singh and on the west by Jhang.

=== Climate ===
Faisalabad overlaps between a semi-arid climate and a humid subtropical climate.

The weather in the city is monitored by the Pakistan Meteorological Department. The Pakistan Meteorological Department regularly provides forecasts, public warnings and rainfall information to farmers with the assistance of the National Agromet Centre.

Average annual rainfall is approximately 650 millimetres (26 in). It is at its peak in July, August and September during the monsoon season though western disturbances during winter months also bring considerable rainfall associated with hail. Monsoon season which starts in July and ends in September brings heavy rain to the city causing flash flooding. If the monsoon currents interact with the western disturbance, then cloudburst can also occur. July is the wettest month of the year during which flooding is reported a number of times. Monsoon ends in September and then the dry period begins. October and November are the driest months with very little rainfall. During winter the weather usually remains cloudy associated with frequent fog. Record-breaking rainfall of 264.2 millimetres (10.40 in) was recorded on 5 September 1961 by the Pakistan Meteorological Department. The temperature of the city has reached a summer maximum record temperature of 48.0 °C (118.4 °F), which was observed on 9 June 1947 and again on 26 May 2010. An extreme minimum temperature of −4.0 °C (24.8 °F) was recorded on 15 January 1978. The highest wind gust ever recorded in Faisalabad occurred during a severe dust-thunderstorm on 2 June 2000, when the maximum wind speed reached 151 kilometers per hour (94 mph). Apart from temperature and rainfall records, the winds in Faisalabad are generally light. The city lies in an area with low wind speeds. Westerly breeze dominates the afternoons, while the nights are calm. Southeast / easterly winds are common here during the monsoon season. Faisalabad, being in the plains, can experience severe thunderstorms and high wind gusts that can be damaging to its crops.

Climate data for Faisalabad (1980-2015)
Month	Jan	Feb	Mar	Apr	May	Jun	Jul	Aug	Sep	Oct	Nov	Dec	Year
Record high °C (°F)	26.6 (79.9)	30.8 (87.4)	37 (99)	44 (111)	47.5 (117.5)	48 (118)	46.1 (115.0)	42 (108)	41.1 (106.0)	40 (104)	36.1 (97.0)	29.2 (84.6)	48 (118)
Mean daily maximum °C (°F)	19.0 (66.2)	22.1 (71.8)	27.1 (80.8)	34.1 (93.4)	39.2 (102.6)	40.3 (104.5)	37.3 (99.1)	36.4 (97.5)	35.6 (96.1)	32.9 (91.2)	27.3 (81.1)	21.6 (70.9)	31.6 (88.9)
Mean daily minimum °C (°F)	4.7 (40.5)	7.5 (45.5)	12.9 (55.2)	18.3 (64.9)	23.7 (74.7)	26.7 (80.1)	27.3 (81.1)	26.7 (80.1)	24.0 (75.2)	17.5 (63.5)	10.8 (51.4)	5.7 (42.3)	17.4 (63.3)
Record low °C (°F)	−2.9 (26.8)	−1.4 (29.5)	1 (34)	7 (45)	13 (55)	17 (63)	19 (66)	18.6 (65.5)	15.6 (60.1)	9 (48)	2 (36)	−1.3 (29.7)	−4 (25)
Average precipitation mm (inches)	11.3 (0.44)	20.5 (0.81)	25.8 (1.02)	24.8 (0.98)	15.1 (0.59)	55.9 (2.20)	92 (3.6)	83.7 (3.30)	58.1 (2.29)	5.5 (0.22)	2.7 (0.11)	7.1 (0.28)	402.5 (15.85)
Average precipitation days	2	4	7	6	5	6	10	10	4	2	2	3	61
Average relative humidity (%)	61	51	44	26	21	18	63	55	57	26	31	51	42

== Geology ==
Faisalabad region is part of the alluvial plains of the upper Indus Basin. The alluvial deposits are typically over a thousand feet thick. The interfluves are believed to have been formed during the Late Pleistocene and feature river terraces. These were later identified as old and young floodplains of the Ravi River on the Kamalia and Chenab Plains. The old floodplains consist of Holocene deposits from the Ravi and Chenab rivers.

The soil consists of young stratified silt loam or very fine sand loam which makes the subsoil weak in structure with common kankers at only five feet. The course of the rivers within Faisalabad is winding and often subject to frequent alternations. In the rainy season, the currents are very strong. This leads to high floods in certain areas which do last for a number of days. The Rakh and Gogera canals have encouraged the water levels in the district however the belt on the Ravi River has remained narrow. The river bed does include the river channels which have shifted the sand bars and low sandy levees leading to river erosion. Faisalabad is situated at the centre of the lower Rechna Doab, the area is located between the Chenab and Ravi rivers. There is a mild slope from the northeast to the southwest with an average fall of 0.2–0.3 metres per kilometre (1.1–1.6 feet per mile). The city is situated at an elevation of about 183 metres (600 ft). The topography is marked by valleys, local depression and high ground.

== Government and administration ==
Faisalabad was restructured into city district status; a devolution promulgated by the 2001 local government ordinance (LGO). It is governed by the city district's seven departments: Agriculture, Community Development, Education, Finance and Planning, Health, Municipal Services, and Works and Services. The district coordination officer of Faisalabad (DCO) is head of the city district government and responsible for co-ordinating and supervising the administrative units.

=== Tehsil Municipal Administration ===
In 2005, Faisalabad was reorganised as a city district composed of eight Tehsil municipal administrations (TMAs) or towns as follows: Lyallpur, Madina, Jinnah, Iqbal, Chak Jhumra, Jaranwala, Samundari, and Tandlianwala. The functions of the TMA include preparation of the spatial and land use plans, management of these development plans and exercise of control over land use, land sub-division, land development and zoning by public and private sectors, enforcement of municipal laws, rules and by-laws, provision and management of water, drainage waste and sanitation along with allied municipal services.

There are 118 union councils in Faisalabad. Their role is to collect and maintain statistical information for socio-economic surveys. They consolidate ward neighbourhood development needs and prioritise these into union-wide development proposals. The council identifies any deficiencies in the delivery of these services and makes recommendations for improvement to the TMA.

=== Faisalabad Development Authority ===
The Faisalabad Development Authority (FDA) was validly established in October 1976 under The Punjab Development of Cities Act (1976) to regulate, supervise and implement development activities in its jurisdiction area. The FDA acts as a policy-making body for the development of the city and is in charge of arranging and supervising major developments within the city. It is responsible for the administration of building regulations, management of parks and gardens and subsoil water management. The FDA works with the Water and Sanitation Agency (WASA) to control and maintain the water supply, sewerage and drainage. The FDA works to improve conditions in the slums.

== Demographics ==
Historical population

Year	Pop.	±% p.a.
1941	69,930	—
1951	179,127	+9.86%
1961	425,240	+9.03%
1972	823,344	+6.19%

Year	Pop.	±% p.a.
1981	1,104,209	+3.31%
1998	2,008,861	+3.58%
2017	3,210,158	+2.50%
2023	3,691,999	+2.36%

Faisalabad was established as one of the first planned towns of British India, covering an area of 3 square kilometres (1.2 sq mi). It was initially designed to accommodate 20,000 people. The city's population increased from 69,930 in 1941 to 179,000 in 1951 (152.2% increase). Much of the increase is attributed to the settlement of Muslim refugees from East Punjab and Haryana, India. In 1961, the population rose to 425,248, an increase of 137.4%. Faisalabad set a record in the demographic history of Pakistan by registering an overall population increase of 508.1% between 1941 and 1961. The industrial revolution of the 1960s contributed to population growth. In 1961, the population was 425,248. A 1972 census ranked Faisalabad as the third largest city of Pakistan with a population of 864,000. In a 1981 census, the population was 1,092,000; however, the Faisalabad Development Authority estimated the number to be 1,232,000. In the 2017 census, the total population of the city was 3,210,158. In 2023 Pakistani census, the population of the city increased to 3,691,999. The province of Punjab, in which Faisalabad is the second largest city, has prevalent sociocultural distinctions. Population sizes vary by district but some distinguishing factors include a young age structure, high age dependency ratio, a higher percentage of males, a higher proportion of married population, and heterogeneity in tribes and languages.

=== Languages ===
Languages of Faisalabad (2023)
1. Punjabi (90.9%)
2. Urdu (8.00%)
3. Others (1.10%)

In the 2023 census, 90.86% of the population in Faisalabad city spoke Punjabi and 8% Urdu as their first language.

=== Religions ===
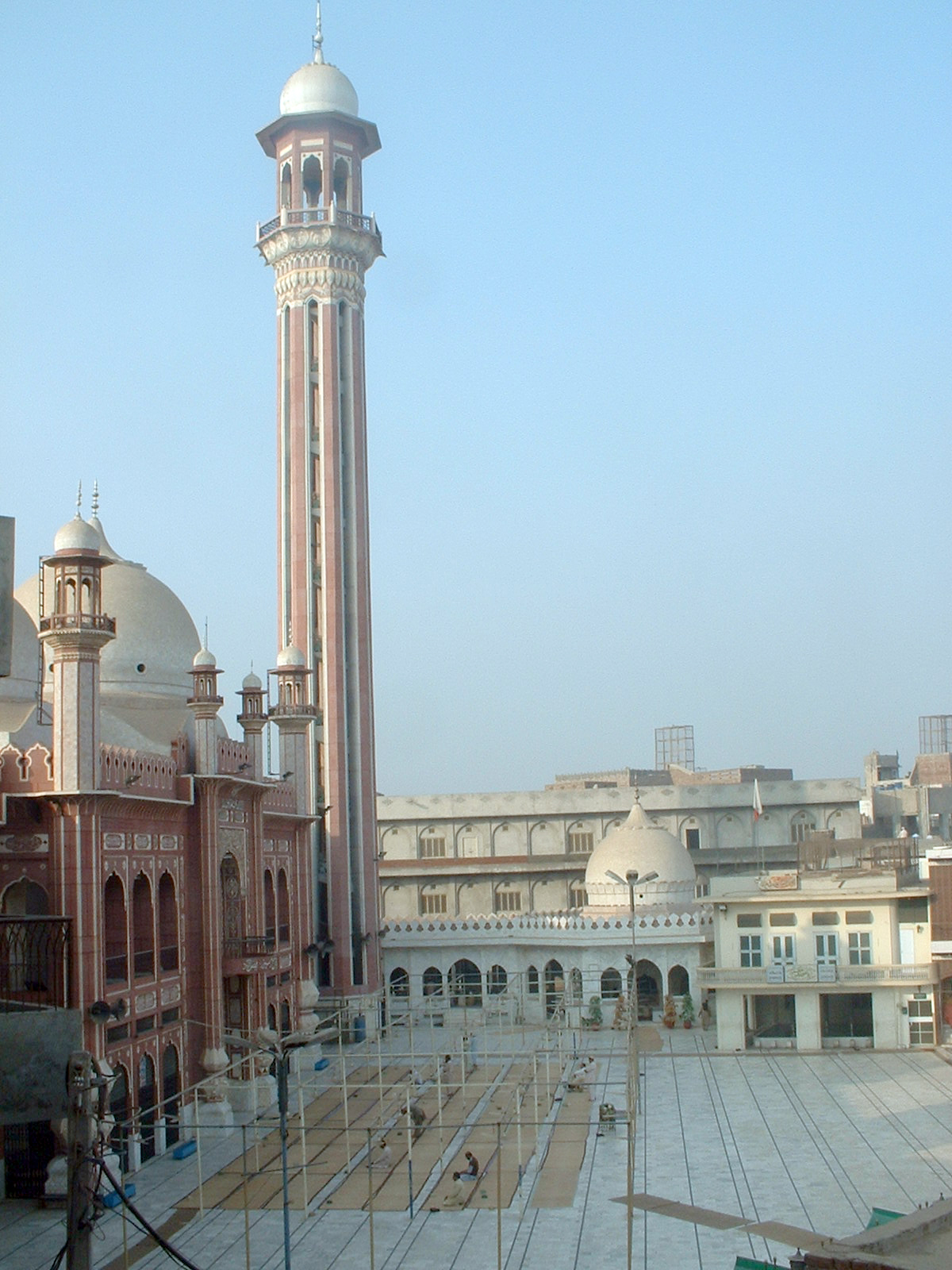
A Mughal inspired mosque in the old city. The majority of the population are Muslim.

Islam is the most common religion, with a 97.22% Muslim majority according to the 1998 Pakistan census report and 2001 population data sheet. People live in tight-knit joint families, although a nuclear family system is emerging due to changing socio-economic conditions. Ancient culture prevails in most marriage practices in the region, as do certain restrictions related to ethnicity and tribes. However, the influences of more modern societies have effected some change, particularly in the area of the dowry system. In the following ancient culture, marriages are customarily arranged by the parents or matchmakers.Studies conducted in 2007 and 2013, the latter in an outlying rural village in Faisalabad District, acknowledged the existence of gender bias and discrimination against females, stating that "Gender discrimination is not a new phenomenon", and that it still exists in the modern world.

Social change in the region has been a slow process but there are indications that change has occurred as more villages are exposed to various forms of media and modernized urban communities. In early 2014, there was a march known as the "White Ribbon Campaign" which took place in front of the Faisalabad Press Club. Protesters appealed to the government to adopt new laws "to protect women who are discriminated against in the family and workplace."

Prevalent minorities, particularly Christians, feel a sense of vulnerability because of their religious beliefs. Labourers and farmhands form the countless Christian villages throughout Punjab; many are descendants of people who converted from Hinduism to Christianity under the British Raj, and considered low caste by virtue of their birth. A small population of wealthy, well-educated Christians have settled in Karachi; however, as a result of increasing Islamization, religious intolerance in Pakistani society, blasphemy laws and Islamist militancy, most have left Pakistan to settle in other countries where there is more religious tolerance, such as Canada and Australia.

The Sita Ram temple is a Hindu temple near Jhang Bazaar region in the district. However the temple is currently neglected and deteriorated. The Hindu community has been demanding the reopening of the shrine.

Religious groups in Faisalabad City (1901−2023) (Note: 1901-1941: Data for the entirety of the town of Lyallpur, which included Lyallpur Municipality. 2017-2023: Combined urban populations of Faisalabad City Tehsil and Faisalabad Saddar Tehsil.)
Religious group	1901		1911		1921		1931		1941		2017		2023	
Religious group	Pop.	%	Pop.	%	Pop.	%	Pop.	%	Pop.	%	Pop.	%	Pop.	%
Islam	4,232	46.15%	9,166	46.82%	11,116	39.51%	15,534	36.19%	23,003	32.89%	3,114,321	95.82%	3,533,749	95.97%
Christianity	132	1.44%	758	3.87%	1,100	3.91%	1,988	4.63%	3,027	4.33%	131,686	4.05%	145,267	3.95%
Hinduism (Note: 1931-1941: Including Ad-Dharmis)	4,434	48.35%	8,024	40.98%	12,922	45.93%	20,147	46.94%	32,896	47.04%	131	0%	641	0.02%
Sikhism	365	3.98%	1,607	8.21%	2,958	10.51%	5,181	12.07%	10,897	15.58%	—N/a	—N/a	147	~0%
Jainism	7	0.08%	23	0.12%	38	0.14%	65	0.15%	34	0.05%	—N/a	—N/a	—N/a	—N/a
Zoroastrianism	1	0.01%	0	0%	2	0.01%	7	0.02%	—N/a	—N/a	—N/a	—N/a	2	0%
Ahmadiyya	—N/a	—N/a	—N/a	—N/a	—N/a	—N/a	—N/a	—N/a	—N/a	—N/a	3,822	0.12%	2,080	0.06%
Others	0	0%	0	0%	0	0%	0	0%	73	0.1%	71	0%	150	0%
Total population	9,171	100%	19,578	100%	28,136	100%	42,922	100%	69,930	100%	3,250,031	100%	3,682,036	100%

=== Literacy ===
In 1981, Faisalabad was among four districts in Punjab, which included Gujranwala, Jhelum and Gujrat, that were experiencing low literacy rates, due primarily to either a lack of resources or family pressure; the latter of which may also be attributable to illiteracy. In 1998, Faisalabad progressed to a higher literacy rate with the most improvement realised at the primary school level. In 2008, Faisalabad District ranked 51.9% which placed the district ninth in literacy out of the 34 Punjab districts.

In 2014, the city held its first literary festival which brought a number of writers to the city to encourage the community to follow the arts. Two literary groups were established, the Faisalabad Union of Column Writers and Faisalabad Union of Journalists, to bring together printed media personalities for the purpose of providing training to budding writers from the city.

According to the 2023 census, the literacy rate in the Faisalabad city is 81.6%.

== Economy ==
Faisalabad contributes over 20% toward Pakistan's annual GDP. Faisalabad's average annual GDP is $20.55 billion (USD), of which 21% comes from agriculture. The surrounding countryside, irrigated by the lower Chenab River, produces agricultural commodities such as cotton, rice, sugarcane, wheat, fruit and vegetables. The city has carved a niche as an industrial centre with its highways, railways, railway repair yards, processing mills, and engineering works. It is also a producer of industrial goods and textile manufacturing including cotton and silk textiles, super phosphates, hosiery, dyes, industrial chemicals, clothing, pulp and paper, printing, agricultural equipment, ghee (clarified butter), and beverages.

The Faisalabad Chamber of Commerce and Industry monitors industrial activity in the city and reports their findings to the Federation of Pakistan Chambers of Commerce & Industry and provincial government. The city also has a major dry port and international airport.

Faisalabad is recognised as the centre of the textile industry in Pakistan, contributing to half of Pakistans total textile shipments. At the end of June 2012, textile mills employed 20% of the nation's workforce, and generated 1.3 trillion rupees ($13.8 billion) in textile products, most of which were exported to the US and Europe. While Punjab's economy is driven primarily by agriculture, the textile industry along with leather products and light engineering goods also play an important role with over 48,000 industrial units spread across Punjab.

The Clock Tower, Faisalabad and its eight bazaars (markets) remain a major trading zone in the city. These bazaars are connected to each other by a round road referred to as Gol Bazaar. Each of the eight bazaars has a special name and is known for selling certain goods as follows:

- Katchery Bazaar, named for the court (Katchery), is known for its mobile phone and accessory market.
- Chiniot Bazaar is known for allopathic and homoeopathic medicinal stores, cloth, blankets, sofa cloth, and curtains. It also has poultry feed wholesale shops.
- Aminpur Bazaar supplies stationery and interior décor.
- Bhawana Bazaar supplies electrical and electronic goods.
- Jhang Bazaar supplies fish, meat, vegetables and fruits.
- Montgomery Bazaar (also known as Sutar Mandi) is known for yarn and raw cloth trading.
- Kharkhana Bazaar is known for herbal medicines.
- Rail Bazaar is a gold and cloth market.

Faisalabad has also received substantial funding from the Government of Punjab and the City District Government to improve infrastructure and roads to rural areas. In an effort to deal with the energy crisis, the FCCI has been working with private companies to develop renewable energy resources such as solar energy and the construction of dams within the district. CAE, a German-based renewable energy company, has disclosed plans to establish the first solar panel manufacturing facility in Faisalabad, second of its kind in Asia, with intentions of investing upwards of €100 million (Rs12.9 billion) for its development.

== Public services ==
=== Law enforcement ===
Law enforcement in Faisalabad is carried out by provincial police force officially called Punjab Police. Within the city of Faisalabad, it is under the command of the city police officer (CPO), an appointment by the provincial government appointments for Punjab Police. The office of the CPO is located in the District Courts, Faisalabad. Police formations including District Police, Elite Police, Punjab highway Patrol, Crime Investigation Branch, and Special Operations Branch have offices in the city.

District and Sessions Court in Faisalabad is an extension of the provincial bench of High Court in Lahore.

=== Taxation ===
Regional Tax Office is a field formation of the Federal Board of Revenue (FBR). It is situated at Regional Tax Office, Jail Road. This office is responsible for monitoring and collection of federal taxes imposed by the Government of Pakistan. This office has jurisdiction to send notices, research and execute legal notices for entities operating within the district of Faisalabad.

This office actively runs mass media campaigns to create awareness regarding taxation, legal rights of citizens and to facilitate voluntary tax compliance. This office can provide information regarding Income Tax, Sales Tax (VAT), Corporation Tax and Zero-Tax rated services. The website managed and operated by the Federal Board of Revenue, is a reliable and up-to-date source of information for all tax related matters. FBR does issue regular notices to ensure correct information is published and to disregard false information circulating in the market places by unverified sources. Excise, Taxation and Narcotics Control Department is another department managed by the provincial Govt. of Punjab.

=== Water and Sanitation ===
The Water and Sanitation Agency (WASA) is a subsidiary of Faisalabad Development Authority (FDA), established on 23 April 1978 under the Development of Cities Act 1976. Estimates in indicate that the WASA provides about 72% of the city's sewerage services and about 60% of their water services. The existing production capacity of the WASA is 65 million imperial gallons per day (300 million litres per day), almost all of which is drawn from wells located in the old beds of the Chenab River. From the wells, water is pumped to a terminal reservoir located on Sargodha Road. Water is normally supplied for a total of about 8 hours per day to the majority of the city. The Japan International Cooperation Agency (JICA) has provided financial and hardware equipment to help improve the water and sanitation conditions in the city.

== Culture ==
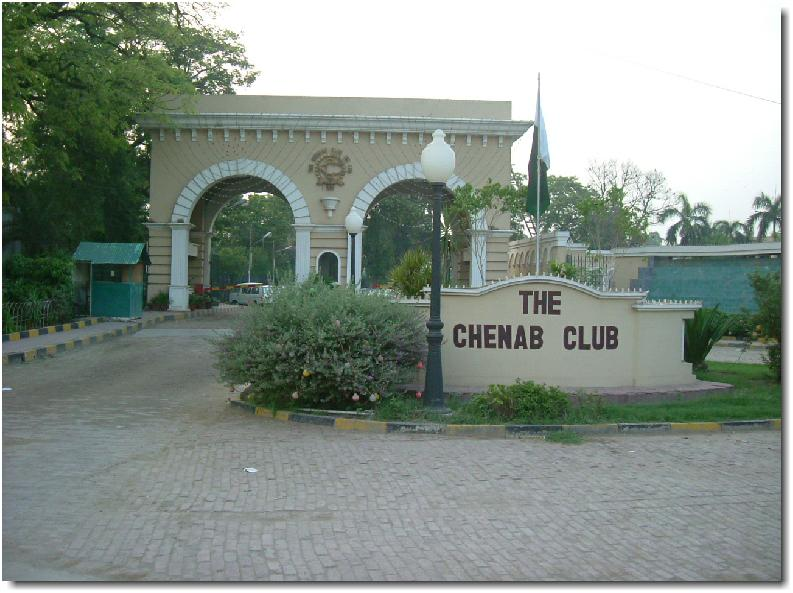
The Chenab Club, built in 1904 is the oldest social club in the city.

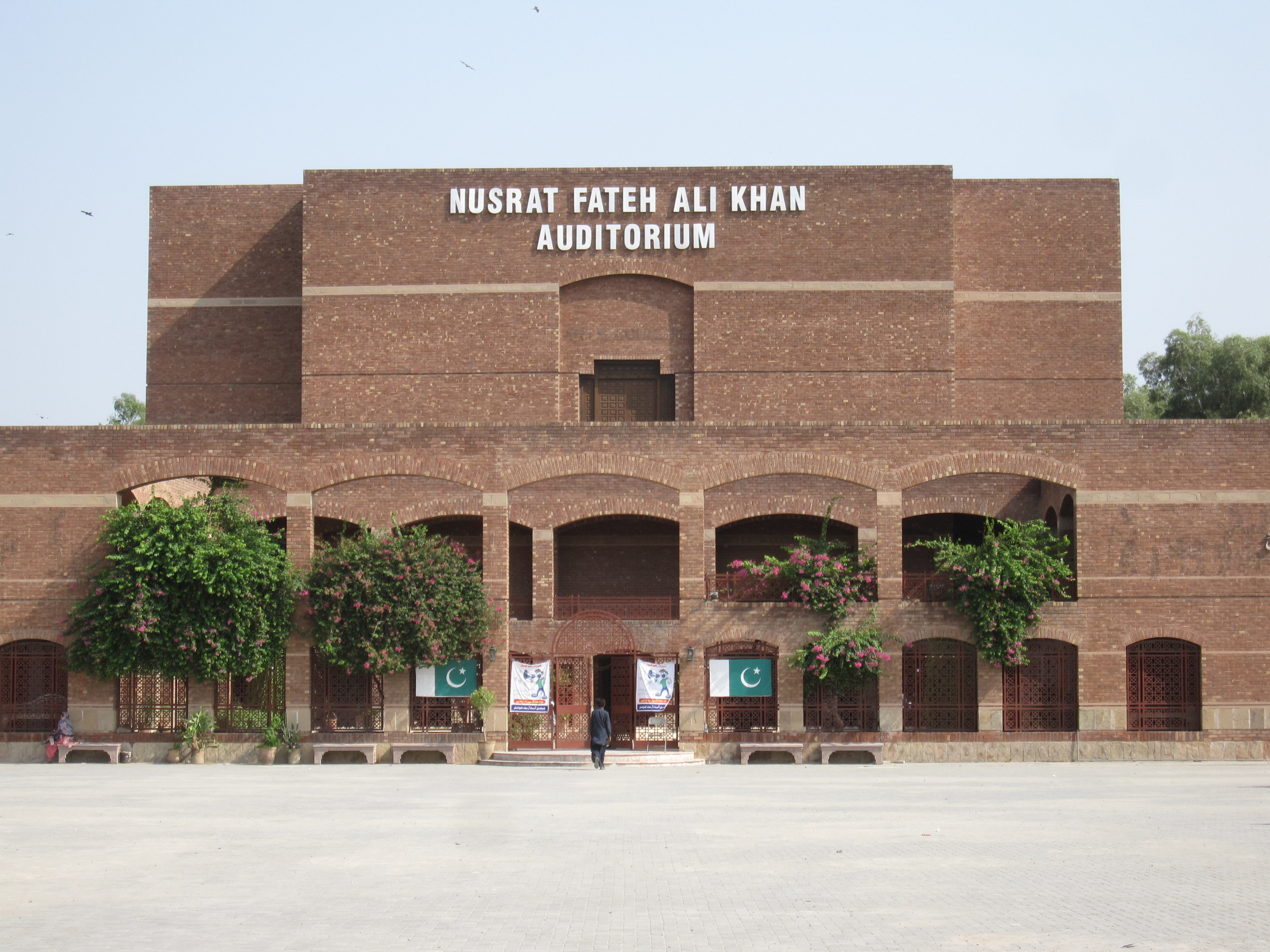
The Nusrat Fateh Ali Khan Auditorium, home of the Faisalabad Arts Council

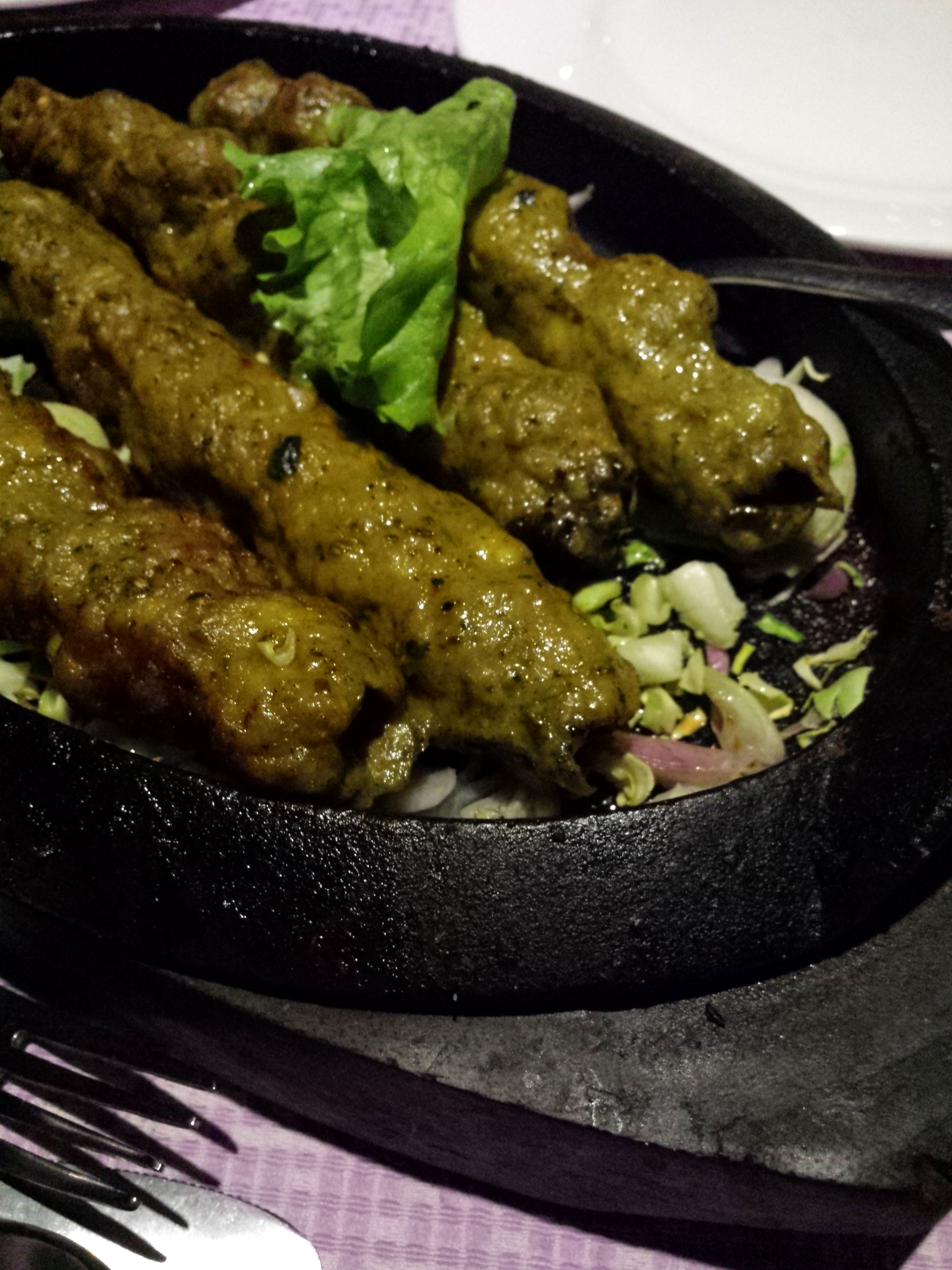
Malai seekh kebabs

Faisalabad is an epicentre for trade that has gained popularity for its colonial heritage sites. In 1982, the Government of Punjab established the Faisalabad Arts Council, a division of the Punjab Arts Council which is overseen administratively by the Information, Culture and Youth Affairs Department. The Faisalabad Arts Council building was completed in 2006. The auditorium was named after the late Nusrat Fateh Ali Khan, a Pakistani musician and singer.

=== Festivals ===
The Punjabi people celebrate a variety of cultural and religious festivals throughout the Punjab region, such as arts and craft, music, local events, and religious celebrations. The city of Faisalabad customarily celebrates its independence day on 14 August every year by raising the Pakistan flag at the clock tower in the Commissioner Office compound. Bazaars are colourfully decorated for the celebration, government and private buildings are brightly lit, and there are similar flag–raising ceremonies that are typically held in the district and its tehsils.

The arrival of spring brings the annual "Rang-e-Bahar" festival where the Parks & Horticulture Authority of the city district government organise a flower show and exhibition at Jinnah Gardens. The University of Agriculture organises a similar event at their main campus which is known as the "Kissan Mela". The festival of Basant which involves kite flying is an annual tradition in the city despite the ban. The provincial government introduced the "Canal Mela" which involves five days of festivities including the main canal in the city being decorated with national floats and lights ending with a musical concert to conclude the festival.

Being a Muslim majority the city religious observances include Ramadan and Muharram. The festivals of Chaand Raat, Eid al-Fitr and Eid al-Adha are celebrated and are national holidays. The celebration of the Prophet Muhammad birthday is observed in the city which is often referred to as "Eid Milād-un-Nabī". There are a number of darbar and shrines which attract a number of devotees during the annual Urs. There are a number of Christian churches in the city where Easter and Christmas services take place each year.

=== Attire ===
Traditional attire in Faisalabad is Punjabi clothing such as the kurta and sherwanis. Faisalabadi men wear white shalwar kameez as do women but also with a dupatta (scarf). The more religious women wear burqas that may or may not cover the face. Combinations of Pakistani and Western attire are worn by women, such as an embroidered kurta worn with jeans or trousers, and half sleeve or sleeveless shirts with Capri pants. Men and women have adopted some of the modern Western styles for both casual and formal business dress such as dress pants, trousers, T-shirts and jeans.

Faisalabad Institute of Textile and Fashion Design at the Government College University teaches Fashion Design as part of their Fine Arts program. Some of the more conservative establishments and universities follow strict dress codes, such as the National Textile University in Faisalabad where a notice was issued on 27 April 2016 by university professor Muhammad Ashfaq. The intent of the notice was to "promote a positive image of the NTU and to maintain good moral, religious and cultural values among the faculty, staff and students." The dress code bans certain styles of Western attire including shorts, sleeveless shirts and shawls for men. Women are prohibited from wearing jeans, tights or leggings, sleeveless or half-sleeved shirts for women. Women are also prohibited from wearing heavy make-up and expensive jewellery.

=== Cuisine ===
Faisalabadi cuisine is a mixture of Punjabi cuisine as well as Mughlai cuisine and Anglo-Indian cuisine. Famous dishes include rice or roti (flatbread) served with a vegetable or non-vegetable curry, a salad consisting of spiced tomatoes and onions, and yogurt. This is usually accompanied by a variety of South Asian sweets such as gud, gajar ka halwa, gulab jamun, and jalebi. Tandoori barbecue specialties consist of a variety of naan bread served with tandoori chicken, chicken tikka or lamb shish kebab served with a mint chutney.

Street foods are a key element to Faisalabadi cuisine. Samosas (deep-fried pastry filled with vegetables or meat) topped with an onion salad and two types of chutney. There is even a square dedicated to them in the old city. Other street foods include dahi bhale (deep-fried vadas in creamy yoghurt), gol gappay (fried round puri filled with vegetables and topped with tamarind chutney) and vegetable or chicken pakoras. Biryani and murgh pilao rice are a speciality in Faisalabad.

A typical breakfast in Faislabadi is halwa poori, consisting of a deep-fried flatbread served with a spicy chickpea curry and sweet orange-coloured halwa. It is customarily accompanied by a sweet or salty yoghurt-based drink called lassi. During winter, a common breakfast is roghni naan served with paya.

Certain drinks are available seasonally, such as rabri doodh, a drink commonly made with full-fat milk, almonds, pistachios and basil seeds, dhood patti (milky tea), and Kashmiri chai, a pink-coloured milky tea containing almonds and pistachios, which is had in the winters. During summer, drinks such as sugarcane juice, nimbu pani (iced lemon water), skanjvi (iced orange and black pepper) and lassi are consumed.

== Education ==
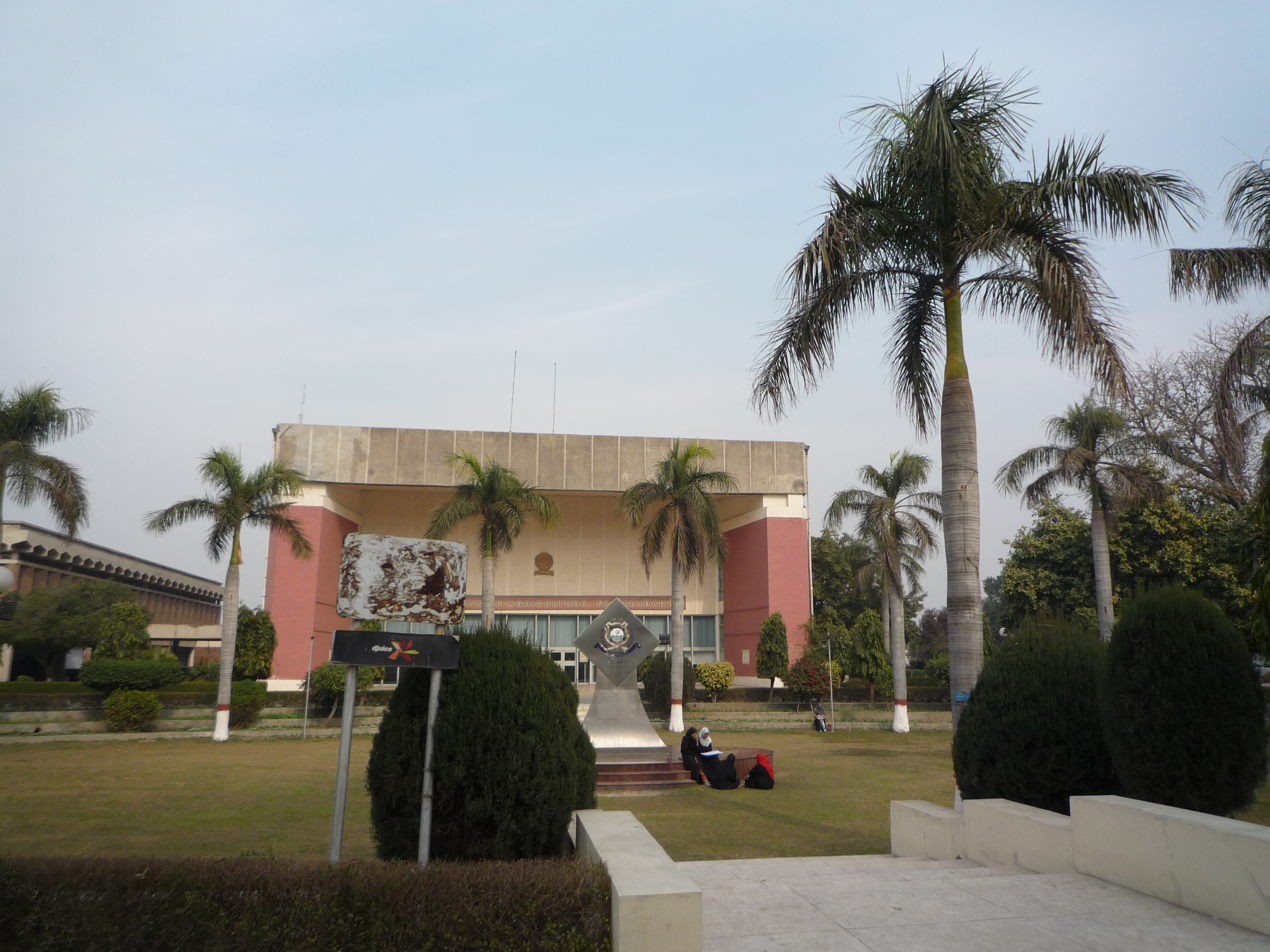

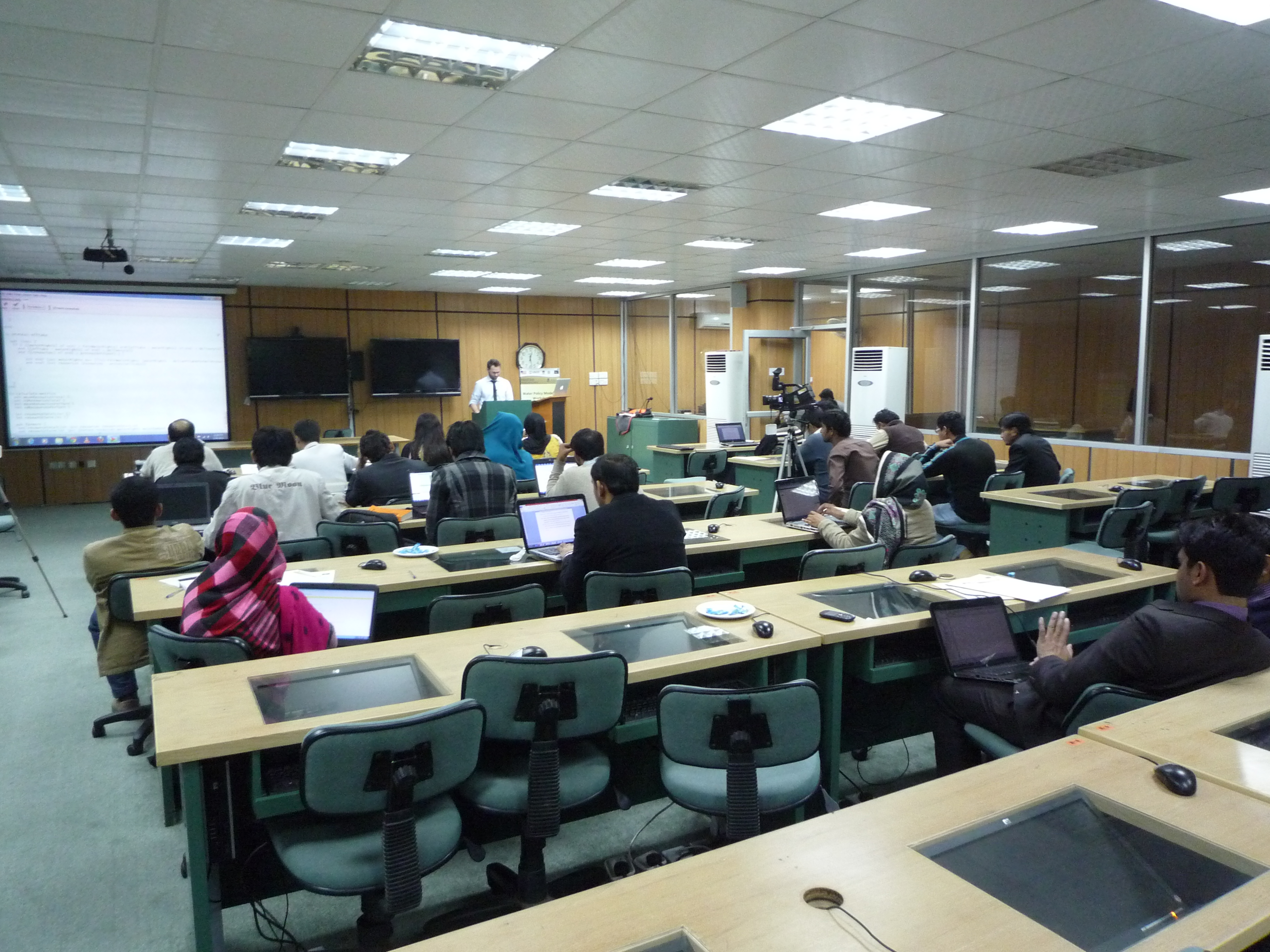
Department of Chemistry and Biochemistry, Faculty of Sciences, University of Agriculture.

Faisalabad has several research and educational institutions. Faisalabad is considered a regional hub for of research and higher education, specializing in agriculture, medical sciences, chemical sciences, textile universities and economics.

There are many public funded institutions that offer scholarships and financing options to lower and middle income households. Many private schools, colleges and universities offer huge range of courses at various levels of education.

The education system is administered by the chief executive officer (CEO) of the District Education Authority of Faisalabad. The city district Government is responsible for funding, finances, management and resource allocation for public run institutions. It falls under the Ministry of Federal Education and Professional Training and the Minister for Education.

Public sector institutions in the city include, University of Agriculture, Government College University Faisalabad, Faisalabad Medical University (formerly: Punjab Medical College), National Textile University, Nuclear Institute for Agriculture and Biology, Government College for Women University Faisalabad (GCWUF), University of Engineering and Technology Faisalabad Campus, University of Education, Divisional Public Schools and Colleges. Private funded institutions include, National University of Modern Languages (NUML), NFC Institute of Engineering and Fertilizer Research (NFC-IEFR), University of Faisalabad, Beaconhouse School System, The City School.

== Healthcare ==
Faisalabad is home to some large public hospitals within the district. Allied Hospital Faisalabad is the largest public funded and managed hospital within the city of Faisalabad as well as the district. It offers many advanced treatments and specialist care facilities.

Other notable government–run hospitals are DHQ (District Headquarter) Hospital, Institute of Child Care, PINUM Cancer Hospital, Govt. Children Hospital, Punjab Social Security Hospital, Social Security Newborn and Children Hospital, Punjab Employees Maternity Ward, and Faisalabad Institute of Cardiology.

There are other government funded and managed general hospitals in Ghulam Muhammadabad, Samanabad and Peoples Colony No. 2.

== Media ==
=== Television and radio ===
The Pakistan Electronic Media Regulatory Authority (PEMRA) is responsible for the regulation and monitoring of electronic media entertainment in the country. Pakistan Television Corporation, is the state-owned regulated television broadcasting network. The government began licensing private broadcasters in 2002.

The government of Pakistan installed the first radio transmitters in the city on 15 September 1982. "Radio Pakistan" broadcasts three government regulated FM stations: "Radio Pakistan FM101, Radio Pakistan FM93 and Radio Pakistan Sautul Qur'an Channel FM93.4. FM101 became operational in 2002, FM93 went live in 2010 and FM93.4 Sautul Qur'an Channel went live in 2016; PBC all three stations are standard power KW 2.5.

=== Telecommunications ===
Pakistan Telecommunication Authority is a government-owned organisation that is responsible for the establishment, operation and maintenance of telecommunications in the city. The organisation monitors and prevents illegal exchanges in the city.

Pakistan Telecommunication Company Limited is the main provider of fixed line, mobile and broadband services. Regional headquarters is located at the Central Telecom House in Chinot Bazaar. With the deregulation of the telecommunication sector by the Ministry of Information Technology, a range of companies now offer mobile and broadband services in the city.

=== Film and theatre ===
In 2008, the Government of Pakistan lifted a forty-year ban on Bollywood films which allowed Indian films to be played in cinemas. The cinema industry has since seen the introduction of new cinemas such as Cinepax by Hotel One, and Cine Nagina.

The Government College University in Faisalabad encourages students from the University of Agriculture to hold workshops and explore themes of peace and tolerance which can be used in an engaging and entertaining way to communicate complex issues to different audiences.

== Recreation ==
A view of Chenab Club in December 2020

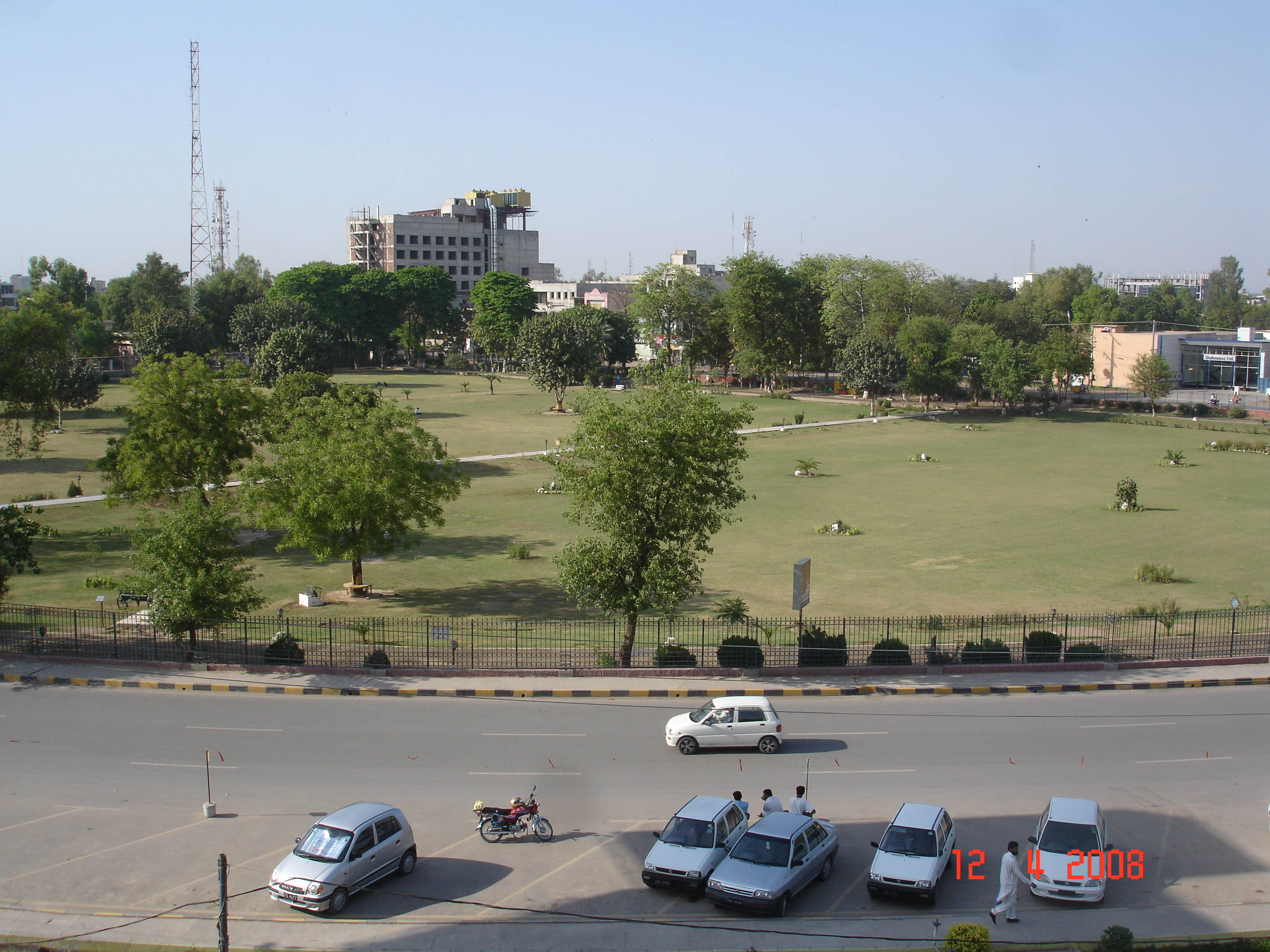
D Ground Central Park was rebuilt by the city district government and now includes miniatures of the symbols of Pakistan such as the Mazar-e-Quaid, Minar-e-Pakistan, and Bab-e-Pakistan.

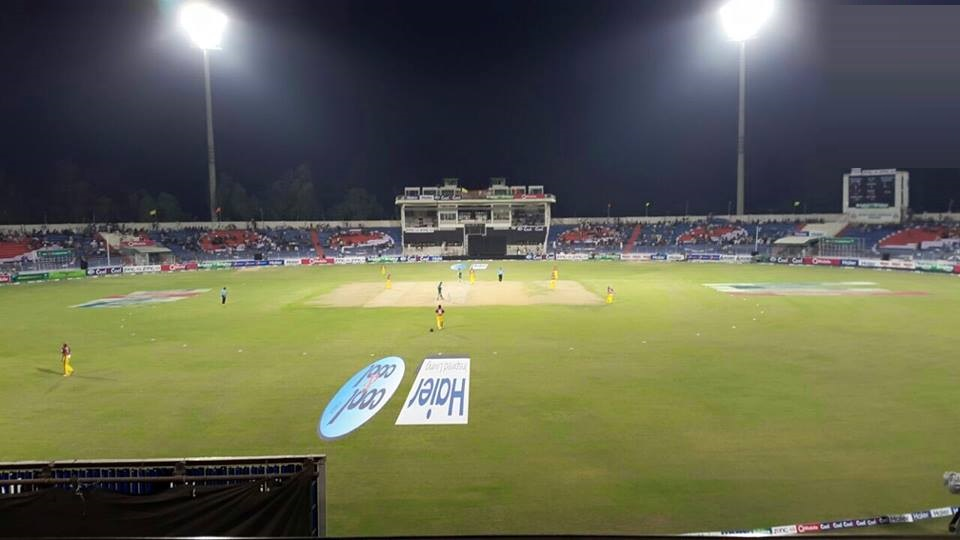
Iqbal Stadium, is an international cricket ground, home to the Faisalabad Wolves cricket team.

=== Public parks ===
The Parks and Horticulture Authority (PHA) is responsible for running and managing all public parks within the district of Faisalabad.

Jinnah Gardens is the oldest and most established public park in the city. It serves as the city's central park, and a cultural hub. It is commonly known as "Company Bagh". A monument of Sir James Broadwood Lyall is situated at the eastern corner of the park.

Dhobi Ghat Park is a historic park, in the oldest part of the city. It is located on Kotwali Road, just next to the Government College University, Faisalabad. The park has a long history of rallies and protests. The park was chosen as a venue of choice by Muhammad Ali Jinnah, Liaqat Ali Khan, Huseyn Shaheed Suhrawardy, Zulfiqar Ali Bhutto, Benazir Bhutto, Nawaz Sharif, Shebaz Sharif, Maryam Nawaz and Imran Khan.

Gatwala Park is located in the outskirts of the city, on the north-eastern side. It serves as a family park with amusements such as a zoo and a lake. The Gatwala Wildlife Park is a botanical natural reserve located next to the Gatwala Park. It that was renovated by the city district government.

Pahari Grounds is located in Peoples Colony #2. It is a residential area popular locations such as Babar Chowk, Fawara Chowk and the old gates. A Pakistan Air Force retired F-86 Sabre is on display on a hilltop within this park. It is a local attraction. D-Ground Park is located in the Peoples Colony #1 area, within the D-Ground shopping area. Several models of Pakistani monuments are on display in this park, all year round.

=== Sports ===
Cricket is a popular sport in Faisalabad. Regional and international cricket matches are held in Iqbal Stadium, named after poet Sir Allama Muhammad Iqbal. The stadium is home to Faisalabad's local team, the Faisalabad Wolves. Iqbal Stadium hosted the 1987 Cricket World Cup, and the 1996 Cricket World Cup.

The Faisalabad Hockey Stadium, located on Susan Road, was constructed in 2002, and can accommodate 25,000 spectators. On 16 April 2003, the stadium was inaugurated by Khalid Maqbool, governor of Punjab. It is the third-largest field hockey stadium in the country. The stadium has hosted field hockey matches for both national and international competition but by the beginning of 2016 was reported to be in "pathetic condition as its astroturf has completed its life span about eight years ago." Commissioner Naseem Nawaz advised that efforts were under way to maintain the stadium.

In October 2002, the Government College University established a Directorate of Sports to promote university and national level sports for male and female players. Infrastructure and facilities are available for university players in track, hockey, tennis, basketball, table tennis, badminton and cricket pitch.

=== Public libraries and museums ===
There are two libraries that are open to the public: Allama Iqbal Library and Municipal Corporation Public Library. They are funded and regulated by the government of Punjab under the service sector.

- Allama Iqbal Library is located on University Road, opposite the District Courts. The library is housed in the 1911-built colonial building originally named "Coronation Library" during the rule of the British Empire. In 2012, the building came under control of the Lyallpur Heritage Foundation and the Punjab Archives and Libraries Department.
- Lyallpur Museum is located adjacent to the Allama Iqbal Library on University Road. It is a heritage museum and art gallery open to the public. The museum is primarily focused on regional history with a collection of artwork, artefacts and photographs.
- Municipal Library is located in Iqbal Park on Narwala Road, opposite the historical grounds of Dhobi Ghat. The library has a large collection of books, a photo gallery and a conference centre. In 2011, the library underwent a renovation costing 40 million rupees.
- The Forest Library at the Punjab Forestry Research Institute (PFRI) is one of two specialist libraries, the other being in Lahore. Opened in 1986, the research library is based at the Wildlife Research Center in Gatwala.

== Transportation ==
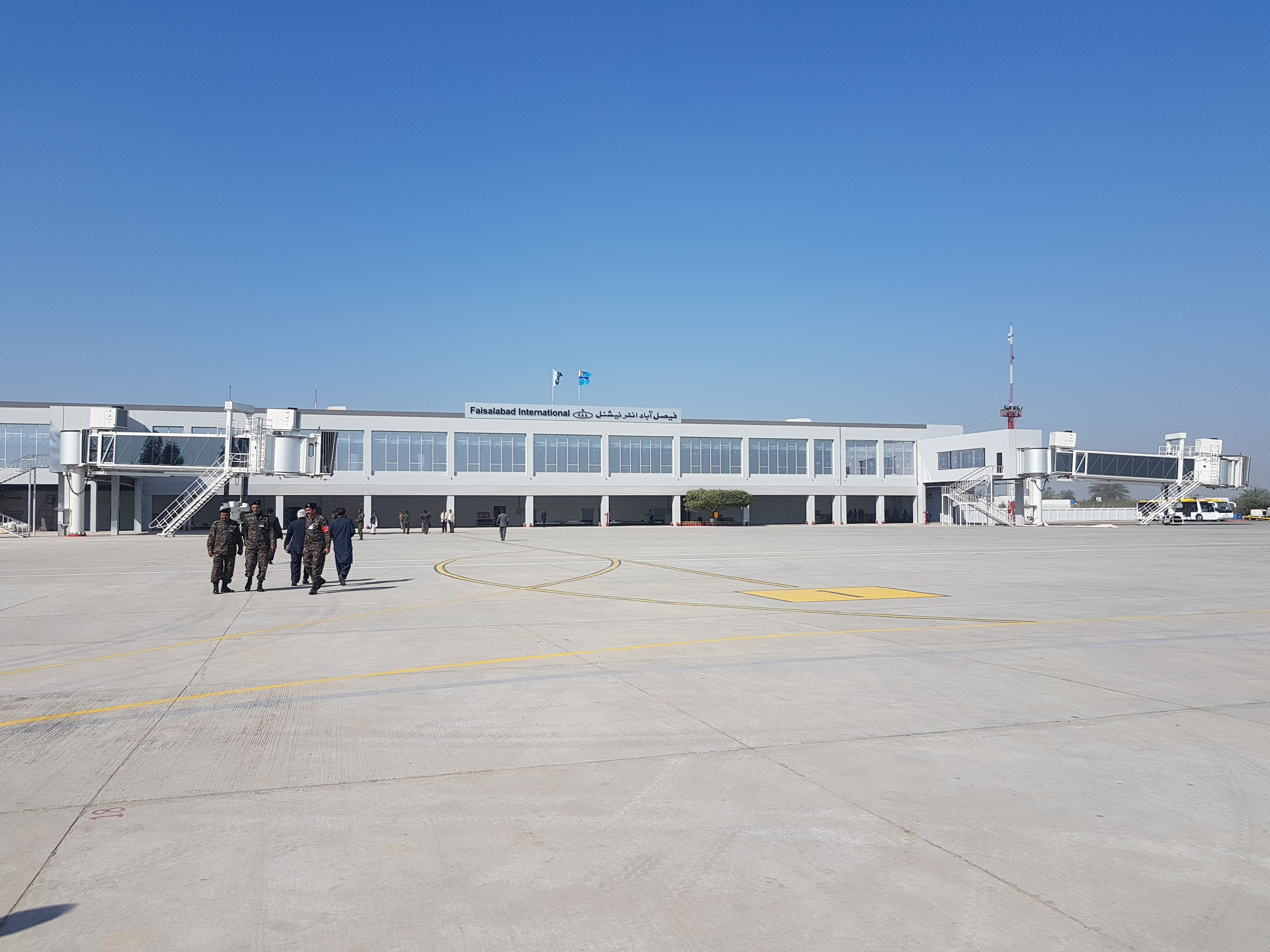
Airside view of Faisalabad Airport

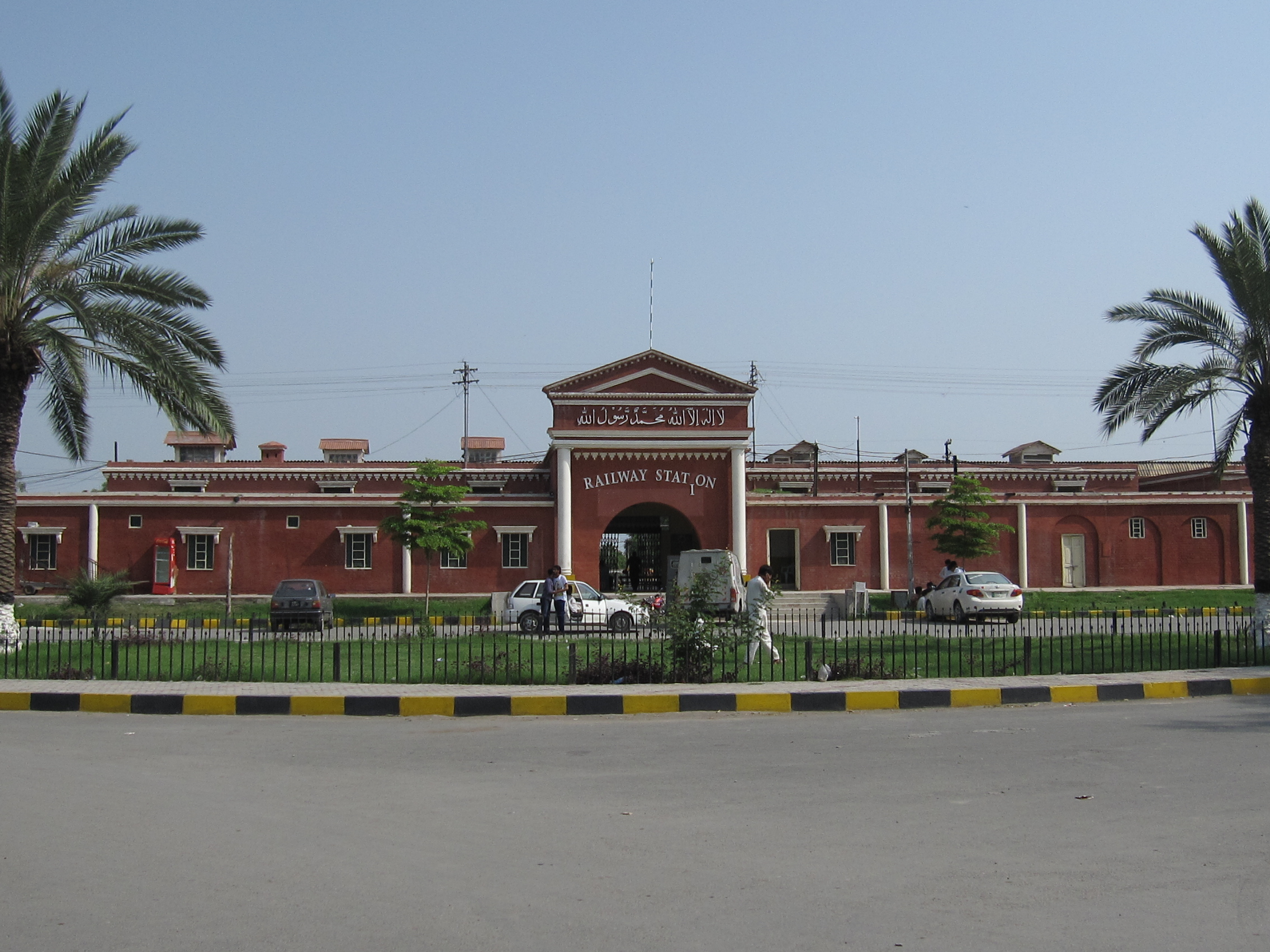
The front entrance to the 19th century colonial railway station

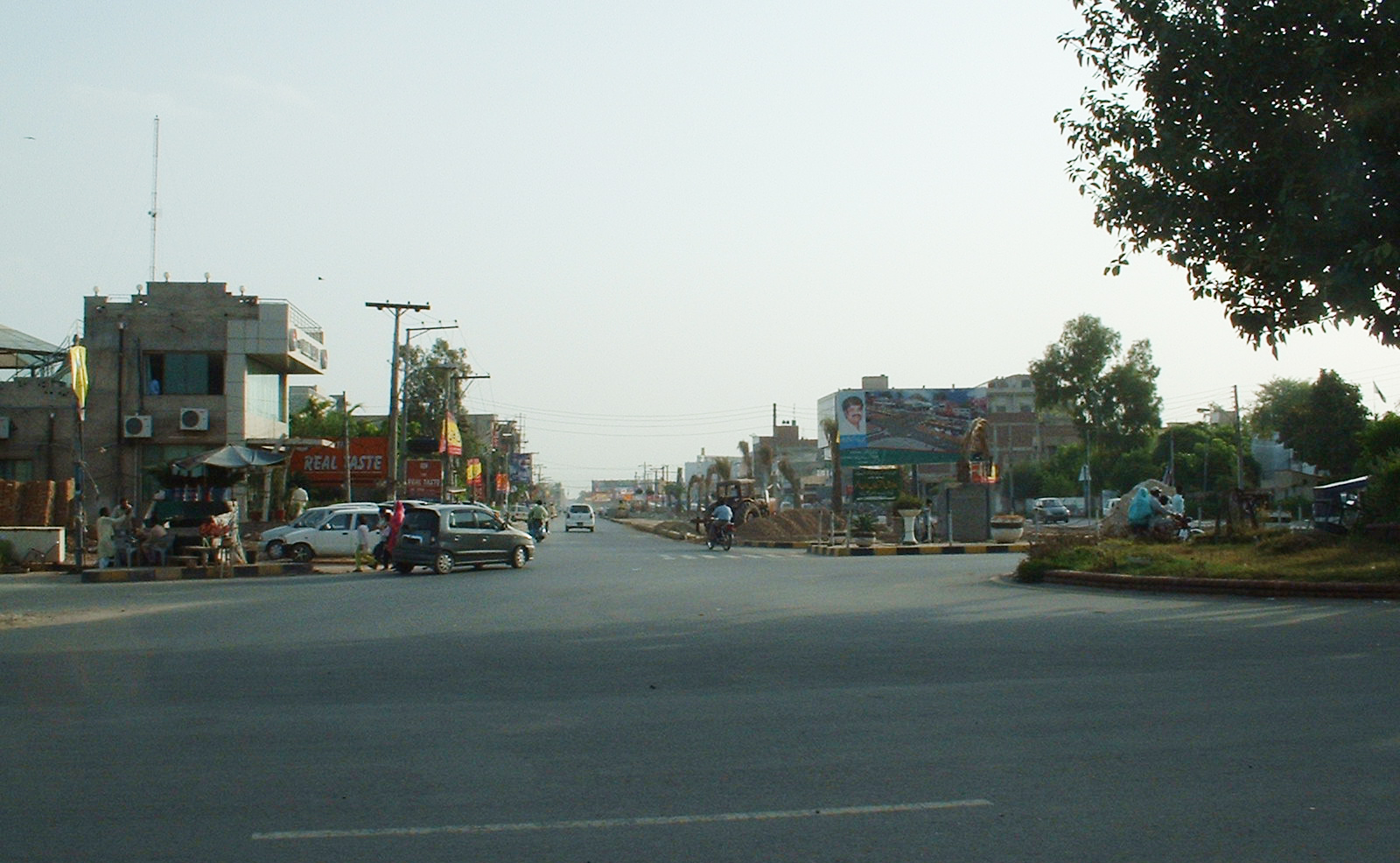
Roads in Faisalabad

=== Airport ===
Faisalabad International Airport is approximately 15 kilometres (9.3 mi) from the city center. It is located at Faisalabad-Jhang Road. The airport underwent major renovations during between 2014 and 2017. The main termainal building was completed renovated. Major extensions were carried out as part of a major development initiative by the former Prime Minister of Pakistan, Mian Muhammad Nawaz Sharif. It is a regional airport that serves domestic and international travel. The airport offers cargo, freight, passenger travel, private terminal, flying school, and military base to Pakistan Air Force. The airlines with operations at Faisalabad International Airport include Pakistan International Airlines, FlyDubai, Qatar Airways, Air Arabia, Gulf Air and Serene Air.

=== Rail ===
The Faisalabad railway station is the central railway station in the city. The railway line forms part of the Khanewal–Wazirabad railway line. Rail services are operated by Pakistan Railways, owned and operated by the Ministry of Railways.

Cargo Express services are operated by Pakistan Railways which runs from Karachi to Faisalabad via Multan. Twenty-seven bogies compose the goods train, and are handled respectively by private contractors at the station. The station has a special cargo facility operated by the Ministry of Railways (Pakistan) for handling various goods from the city to other regions of the country. An express parcel service runs from Karachi to Lahore via Faisalabad.

=== Road network ===
Faisalabad has a highly developed road network. There are many access ways in and out of the city. It is well connected through M4 motorway, dual-carriageways and highways.

== Sister cities ==
Faisalabad is a globally recognized city due to its textiles export trade. Its sister cities are:

- Qingdao, China
- Wuhan, China
- Tabriz, Iran
- Kanpur, India
- Kobe, Japan
- Cordoba, Spain
- Sharjah, United Arab Emirates
- Manchester, United Kingdom
- Los Angeles, United States of America

== See also ==
- List of people from Faisalabad
