= Faisalabad Medical University =

Medical university in Faisalabad

Coordinates: 31°27′09″N 73°05′03″E

- Former name: Punjab Medical College (1973-2017)
- Motto: یقین, ایمان, تنظیم, خدمت خلق
- Motto in English: Faith, Belief, Discipline, Service to Mankind
- Type: Public sector university
- Established: 1973 as Punjab Medical College; Upgraded to Faisalabad Medical University in 2017
- Affiliations: University of Health Sciences (Lahore); Pakistan Medical and Dental Council
- Endowment: Rs. 460mn (as of 2014)
- Vice-Chancellor: Zafar Ali Choudry
- Faculty: 173+
- Location: Faisalabad, Punjab, Pakistan
- Campus: Urban
- Colours: Maroon, White (Mascot) / Silver (Uniform first two years)
- Website: Official website

Faisalabad Medical University (Urdu: فیصل آباد جامعه طب; abbr. FMU) is a public medical university located in Faisalabad, Punjab, Pakistan, on a 158-acre (0.64 km^{2}) campus on Sargodha Road. It was established as Punjab Medical College in 1973 and received the status of a university in 2017. Teaching hospitals affiliated with the university are Allied Hospital, District Headquarters Hospital and Government General Hospital, Ghulam Muhammad Abad, Faisalabad. The chief executive is Zafar Chaudhry, a laparoscopic surgeon. The first batch graduated with M.B.B.S degrees in 1978.

== Recognized university ==
With a grant of Rs. 460mn from the government, the construction of new buildings, laboratories and the teaching hospital was completed in 1982. FMU is recognized by the General Medical Council based in London, England, and is listed on World Directory of Medical Schools (it is also listed in the International Medical Education Directory). It is also listed and accredited by Pakistan Medical and Dental Council and is among the recognized universities and degree awarding institutions of the Higher Education Commission of Pakistan.

== Departments ==
=== Basic Departments ===
- Anatomy
- Physiology
- Biochemistry
- Behavioral Sciences
- Pharmacology
- Health Professional Education
- Forensic Medicine
- Pathology
- Community Medicine

=== Clinical Departments ===
For the clinical teaching of medical students, classes are held at the affiliated Allied Hospital and DHQ Hospital in Faisalabad.

- Chest Disease
- Dermatology
- Psychiatry
- Gynaecology
- Ear, Nose and Throat (ENT)
- Surgery
- Ophthalmology
- Gynaecology and Obstetrics
- Pediatric Medicine
- Orthopedics
- Neurosurgery
- Cardiology
- Urology
- Anesthesia
- Radiology
- Oncology
- Nephrology

== Hostels, Libraries and Labs ==
In August 2019, Chief Minister of Punjab (Pakistan) launched the health card scheme and the ceremony was held at the Faisalabad Medical University.

=== Hostels ===
Faisalabad Medical University has separate facilities for boy and girl students. The boys hostel is located across the Sargodha Road in Iqbal Hall and Ibn-e-Sina Hall. Each hall has a mess and common room, and a common gym. The hostels are one of the best in the Punjab province, vested with facilities not present in any other hostel across Punjab.

There are four halls for girl students. Fatima and Ayesha halls, located adjacent to the Allied Hospital, mainly house the final year students while Liaquat hall accommodates first and second year students and Jinnah Hall the 3rd and 4th year. The hostels close by 9 pm and nobody is allowed in or out of the girls hostels after this time.

=== Library ===
The university has a small library with reading room having capacity of 20 students and one common reading room with ca apacity of 100 students without internet facility for students. There is a sizable collection of medical books. The reading room remains open till 9PM.

=== Computer Lab ===
A computer lab of 29 Pentium 4 systems has been set up by the University of Health Sciences, with scanners and printers.

== College Magazine ==
"Parwaz" is the official yearly magazine.

== TEDxFaisalabad Medical University ==
"TEDxFMU" Inaugural Event happened in April 2025, organized and licensed by a student Rahman Tanveer.

== Affiliated Hospitals ==
FMU has two major affiliated hospitals. The first one is the Allied Hospital with a capacity of one thousand beds. The second one is the District Headquarters (DHQ) Hospital.
