= Muhammad Saleem Bajawa =

Pakistani politician

Muhammad Saleem Bajwa is a Pakistani politician. Elected to the Provincial Assembly of the Punjab from Constituency PP-76 (Jhang-IV), he served as an adviser to the Chief Minister, Nawaz Sharif, during the period 1985–1988.
