= Bab-e-Pakistan =

Monument in Punjab, Pakistan

- بابِ پاكستان
- Interactive map of Bab-e-Pakistan
- Location: Walton, Lahore, Pakistan
- Coordinates: 31°28′55″N 74°21′13″E
- Designer: Amjad Mukhtar
- Beginning date: November 2006
- Dedicated to: Muslim refugees who migrated to Pakistan during Partition of India

The Bab-e-Pakistan (Urdu: بابِ پاكستان , lit. 'Gateway of Pakistan') is a national monument in Lahore, Punjab, Pakistan which is being built on the site of one of the major Muslim refugee camps which operated in the aftermath of independence of Pakistan.

The memorial was proposed in 1985, by the late Governor Ghulam Jilani Khan, and was approved immediately by the President Muhammad Zia-ul-Haq. The monument is designed by a Lahore-based architect Amjad Mukhtar, who is a graduate from National College of Arts, Lahore. The monument has an area of 117 acres and will comprise a memorial block, library, park, museum, auditorium and art gallery.

The project experienced some difficulty in getting started because of the unstable political situation following the death of President Muhammad Zia-ul-Haq in 1988. A second attempt was made in 1991 with the support of Prime Minister Nawaz Sharif, but again the project was stalled. The third attempt has been during the administration of President Pervez Musharraf. Construction work started and was due to be completed by 2014, but still has not been completed as of 2026.

== See also ==
- History of Pakistan
- National Monument, Islamabad
- Minar-e-Pakistan
