= Food and Drug Administration (disambiguation) =

Food and Drug Administration may refer to:

- China Food and Drug Administration (NMPA)
- Food and Drug Administration, a government agency in the United States
- Food and Drug Administration, Maharashtra
- Food and Drug Administration (Myanmar)
- Food and Drug Administration (Philippines)
- Food and Drug Administration (Taiwan)
