= Faisalabad Development Authority =

- فیصل آباد ڈویلپمنٹ اتھارٹی

Agency overview
- Formed: 1976; 50 years ago
- Headquarters: Faisalabad, Pakistan
- DG responsible: Muhammad Asif Chaudhry
- Parent agency: Government of Punjab
- Website: www.fda.gov.pk

The Faisalabad Development Authority (FDA) is a body responsible for undertaking and monitoring planned development in the city of Faisalabad, in Punjab, Pakistan. The body acts as a regulatory authority for overseeing the construction of houses, commercial developments and residential areas in the city. It has three main wings:

- Urban Development Wing
- Water and Sanitation Agency (WASA)
- Traffic Engineering Planning Agency (TEPA).

The FDA office is situated on the Railway Station square at the intersection of Mall Road and Circular Road.

The Faisalabad Development Authority (FDA) was established under the Punjab Development of Cities Act, 1976, succeeding the Lyallpur Improvement Trust, which had been established in 1966. The authority is responsible for planning and regulating urban development within its controlled area, including land-use planning, building control and the development of residential and commercial areas. Its Town Planning Directorate processes building plans and deals with matters including plot subdivision, commercialization, completion certificates and violations of building and zoning regulations. The FDA also manages residential and commercial properties in its development schemes, including the allotment, transfer and auction of plots.
