= Abu Anees Muhammad Barkat Ali =

Sufi saint (1911–1997)

- Born: 27 April 1911; Ludhiana, India
- Died: 26 January 1997 (aged 85) (16 Ramadan 1417 Hijri); Dasuha, Faisalabad, Pakistan
- Occupations: Sufism in Pakistan, Writer, Social work
- Children: Six
- Parents: Mian Nigahi Bakhsh (father); Jannat Bibi (mother)

Abu Anees Muhammad Barkat Ali Ludhianvi (ابو انیس محمد برکت علی لودھیانوی) (27 April 1911 – 26 January 1997) was a Muslim Sufi who belonged to 14 spiritual orders including Qadiriyya, Chishti and Naqshbandi.

He was the founder of the non-political, non-profit, religious organisation, Dar-ul-Ehsan. Abu Anees's followers spread all around the world and especially in Pakistan. He spent his whole life preaching Islam. He made first Quran Mahal in Pakistan. A large number of people including politicians and officers used to come to Darul Ehsan to meet Sufi Barkat Ali. His tomb is situated 16 km from Faisalabad near Dasuha on Faisalabad–Samundri Road. Every year, eye camps are arranged at Darul Ehsan where free eye treatments are provided for many people in the months of March and October.

== Early life ==
His father, Nigahi Bakhsh was a landlord.

== Literary works ==
"His literary work is notable in the Muslim world and his name is also included in the List of Muslim writers and poets." He wrote more than 400 books on different topics including religion, ethics and philosophy.

- Makshoofat Manazal-e-Ehsan, 5 volumes
- Kitab-ul-Amal Bis-Sunnah 5 volumes
- Asma-un-Nabi-ul-Kareem, 6 volumes
- Maqalat-e-Hikmat 30 volumes
- Zikr-e-Elahi

== Death ==
Abu Anees Barkat Ali Ludhianvi (QSA) died on 26 January 1997, 16th Ramadan ul mubarik 1417 (AH) at the age of 85. He is buried in Faisalabad.

== Honorary postage stamp ==
On 27 April 2013, Pakistan Post office issued a stamp with a denomination of Rupees 8 under its "Men of Letters" series in honour of Sufi Barkat Ali.

== See also ==
- Baba Qaim Sain
- Baba Noor Shah Wali
- Baba Lasoori Shah
- Molna Saradr Ahmad
