= Sardar Ahmad Chishti =

Pakistani Islamic scholar (1903–1962)

Muhaddith-i A'zam Sardar Ahmad Chishti

Personal life
- Born: 22 September 1903; 29 Jamadiul Akhir 1321 AH Dialgarh Batala British India
- Died: 29 December 1962 (aged 59); 1 Shaban, 1382 AH Jhang Bazaar Faisalabad, Pakistan
- Resting place: Jhang Bazaar, Faisalabad, Pakistan

Religious life
- Religion: Islam
- Denomination: Sunni
- Jurisprudence: Hanafi
- Creed: Maturidi
- Movement: Barelvi

Muslim leader
- Students: Abul Bashar Al Qadri

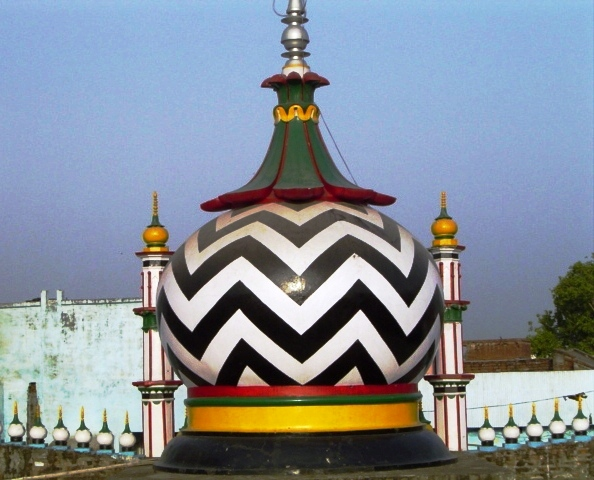

Sardar Ahmad Sayhul Chishti Qadri (Urdu: سردار احمد سیہول چشتی قادری; 1903–1962) was a Pakistani Islamic scholar who is recognized by his followers as Muhaddith-e-Azam Pakistan.

== Family background ==
Sardar Ahmad Chisti's father was Choudhry Miran Bakhsh Chishti. He was born in Dialgarh, Gurdaspur district, East Punjab in a Sayhul Jat family on 22 September 1903 (29 Jumada al-Thani 1321 AH).

His son Fazal Karim was a member of the National Assembly of Pakistan (NA-82 Faisalabad) and the founding chairman of Sunni Ittihad Council (SIC).

== Education and life ==
He attended primary school in Dialgarh village in Batala and Islamic high school in Batala, matriculating in govt school 1924 (1343 AH). He came to Lahore for the preparation of FA, i.e. two years degree programme, and when he attended a speech of Hamid Raza Khan in Masjid Wazeer Khan Lahore he decided to join seminary Manzar-i Islam in Bareilly city.

There he met Hamid Raza Khan, son of Ahmed Raza Khan Barelvi, and decided to join the centre of Islamic sciences and art by abandoning his English education at Manzar-i Islam at Bareilly. He gained instruction from Mustafa Raza Khan Qadri, Amjad Ali Azmi and Muhammad Husain.

Qadri became leader of Mazhare Islam Bareilly when Amjad Ali left seminary for Dadu district, Aligarh. Followers and admirers bestowed upon him the title of Muhaddis-e-Azam-e-Pakistan. He headed the Islamic seminary Mazhar-e-Islam Jamia Rizvia in Jhang Bazaar, Faislabad. He was a patron of the All India Sunni Conference and supported the Pakistan movement.

== Sufism ==
He became a disciple of Shah Muhammad Taj-ul-Haq Chishti in the Chishti order and received successorship and teaching licenses from Hamid Raza Khan, Mustafa Raza Khan Qadri and Amjad Ali Azmi, who gave him teaching permissions and successorship in all saintly orders. He was a disciple of Ahmad Raza Khan. His student was Islamic scholar Muhammad Ibrahim Siddiqui, who formed the Sunni Razvi Society in Mauritius. He was close to Mohammad Abdul Ghafoor Hazarvi. They had both studied with Hamid Raza Khan.

== Rulings ==
According to one fatwa, a person must wear clothes that cover the parts of the body which must be concealed according to Shari’ah. It is recommended to wear clothes for adornment and to express the blessings of God which he has granted.

== Death and shrine ==
Sardar Ahmad Chishti died on 29 December 1962 (1 Sha'ban 1382 AH). His shrine is in Sunni Rizvi Jamia Masjid, Faisalabad city, Pakistan.

== Works ==
By him

- Fataawa-e-Muhaddis-e-Azam published by Maktaba Qadria Faislabad 2001
- Sayyidna Ameer Muawia published by Maktaba Qadariya Faislabad 2018, Pakistan
- Shan E Rasool ( Sallallhu Alaihi Wasalam) Bazuban E Fana Fil Rasool published by Bazm-e-Raza-e-Mustafa Pakistan
- Islami Qanoon-e-Wirasat or Law of Inheritancein Islam published by Maktaba Qadariya Faislabad, Pakistan.
- Tabsara-o-Mazhabi about Allama Inayatullah Khan Mashriqi
- Radee-Mirzayiyat, Refutation of Ghulam Ahmad Qadiyani

About him

- Mohaddise Azam Pakistan- Maulana Muhammada Sardar Ahmad Chishti Qadri by Saeed Jalal-ul-Deen, published by Maktaba Qadria Faislabad 2012.

== See also ==
- Baba Lasoori Shah
- Baba Noor Shah Wali
- Baba Qaim Sain
- Barkat Ali Ludhianwi
