= Sayhul =

- Sehole
- Jāti: Jat
- Religions: Islam, Hinduism, Sikhism
- Languages: Punjabi
- Country: Pakistan, India
- Region: Punjab
- Ethnicity: Punjabi

Sayhul (Urdu: سیہول), also spelled Sehul, Sehol or Sehole, is a Jat clan of Punjabis, found in Pakistan and India, mainly in Faisalabad, Sheikhupura, Gujranwala, Jhelum and other areas in central Punjab. Sayhul are said to be descended from Chauhans.

== Notable people with this surname ==
- Sardar Ahmad Sayhul (1903–1962), Pakistani religious scholar
- Fazal Karim (1954–2013), Pakistani politician and religious scholar
- Hamid Raza (born 1978), Pakistani politician and religious scholar
- Ijaz Ahmad Sayhul (born 1984)), Pakistani politician
