= NA-104 Faisalabad-X =

Constituency of the National Assembly of Pakistan

- Constituency for the National Assembly of Pakistan
- Region: Faislabad City area of Faisalabad District
- Electorate: 528,518

Current constituency
- Member: Raja Daniyal Ahmed Khan
- Created from: NA-85 Faisalabad-XI

NA-104 Faisalabad-X (این اے-104، فیصل آباد-10) is a constituency for the National Assembly of Pakistan.

== Members of Parliament ==
=== 2018–2023: NA-110 Faisalabad-X ===
Election	Member	Party
2018	Raja Riaz	PTI

=== 2024–2025: NA-104 Faisalabad-X ===
Election	Member	Party
2024	Sahibzada Hamid Raza	SIC

== Election 2002 ==
General elections were held on 10 October 2002. Raja Nadir Pervaiz of PML-N won by 41,448 votes.

General election 2002: NA-85 Faisalabad-XI
Party	Candidate	Votes	%	±%
PML(N)	Raja Nadir Pervez	41,448	37.25	
PPP	Bilal Noor Ansari	37,289	33.51	
PML(Q)	Mian Zahid Sarfraz	18,109	16.28	
NA	Muhammad Saeed Ahmad Asad	12,346	11.10	
Others	Others (five candidates)	2,073	1.86	.
Turnout		112,938	39.13	
Total valid votes		111,265	98.52	
Rejected ballots		1,673	1.48	
Majority		4,159	3.74	
Registered electors		288,603		

== Election 2008 ==
General elections were held on 18 February 2008. Muhammad Akram Ansari of PML-N won by 72,197 votes.

General election 2008: NA-85 Faisalabad-XI
Party	Candidate	Votes	%	±%
PML(N)	Haji Muhammad Akram Ansari	72,197	55.15	
PPP	Shakeel Ahmed	46,461	35.49	
PML(Q)	Bilal Noor Ansari	11,139	8.51	
MMA	Fazal-Ur-Rehman Nasir	1,110	0.85	
Turnout		132,930	46.46	
Total valid votes		130,907	98.48	
Rejected ballots		2,023	1.52	
Majority		25,736	19.66	
Registered electors		286,136		
PML(N) hold				

== Election 2013 ==
General elections were held on 11 May 2013. Muhammad Akram Ansari of PML-N won by 124,591 votes and became the member of National Assembly.

General election 2013: NA-85 Faisalabad-XI
Party	Candidate	Votes	%	±%
PML(N)	Haji Akram Ansari	124,696	62.95	
PTI	Mumtaz Iqbal Kahlon	55,313	27.93	
PPP	Malik Sardar Muhammad Tralay Wala	11,183	5.65	
Others	Others (fourteen candidates)	6,887	3.47	
Turnout		200,575	60.42	
Total valid votes		198,079	98.76	
Rejected ballots		2,496	1.24	
Majority		69,383	35.02	
Registered electors		331,974		
PML(N) hold				

== Election 2018 ==
General elections were held on 25 July 2018.

General election 2018: NA-110 Faisalabad-X
Party	Candidate	Votes	%	±%
PTI	Raja Riaz	114,215	45.76	
PML(N)	Rana Muhammad Afzal Khan	108,172	43.34	
Others	Others (nine candidates)	27,226	10.90	
Turnout		253,958	57.01	
Total valid votes		249,613	98.29	
Rejected ballots		4,345	1.71	
Majority		6,043	2.42	
Registered electors		445,459		
PTI gain from PML(N)				

== Election 2024 ==
General elections were held on 8 February 2024. Sahibzada Hamid Raza won the election with 132,654 votes.

General election 2024: NA-104 Faisalabad-X
Party	Candidate	Votes	%	±%
Independent	Sahibzada Hamid Raza (Note: Filed nomination papers as PTI candidate but ECP allowed him to run as an Independent)	132,655	51.41	▲5.65
PML(N)	Daniyal Ahmed	92,610	35.89	▼7.45
Others	Others (twenty-six candidates)	32,746	12.69	
Turnout		262,304	49.63	▼7.38
Total valid votes		258,011	98.36	
Rejected ballots		4,293	1.64	
Majority		40,045	15.52	▲13.10
Registered electors		528,518		

== By-election 2025 ==
A by-election will be held on 18 November 2025 due to the disqualification of Sahibzada Hamid Raza, the previous member from this seat.

By-election 2025: NA-104 Faisalabad-X
Party	Candidate	Votes	%	±%
PML(N)	Raja Daniyal Ahmed Khan	52,791	72.49	
Independent	Rana Adnan javed	19,262	26.45	
Others	Others (three candidates)	775	1.06	
Turnout		73,781	13.23	
Total valid votes		72,828	98.71	
Rejected ballots		953	1.29	
Majority		33,529	46.04	
Registered electors		557,637		

== See also ==
- NA-103 Faisalabad-IX
- NA-105 Toba Tek Singh-I
