= Nisar Akbar Khan =

Pakistani politician

- نثار اکبر خان

Member of the National Assembly of Pakistan
- In office 30 November 1988 – 6 August 1990
- Preceded by: Muhammad Hanif Ansari
- Succeeded by: Akram Ansari
- Constituency: NA-63 (Faisalabad-VII)
- In office 26 March 1977 – 5 July 1977
- Preceded by: Seat Established
- Succeeded by: Muhammad Hanif Ansari
- Constituency: NA-70 (Lyallpur-III)

Personal details
- Born: Chaudhry Nisar Akbar Khan; 1 September 1942
- Died: 24 June 2024 (aged 81)
- Party: Pakistan Tehreek-e-Insaf (2013-2024)
- Other political affiliations: Pakistan Muslim League (N) (2008-2013); Pakistan People's Party (1977-2007); Pakistan Muslim League (1967-77)
- Parent: Chaudhry Ali Akbar Khan (father)
- Occupation: Politician, army officer

Military service
- Allegiance: Pakistan
- Branch/service: Pakistan Army
- Rank: Captain
- Unit: 15 Frontier Force Regiment
- Awards: Sword of Honour

Chaudhry Nisar Akbar Khan (Urdu/Punjabi: چوہدری نثار اکبر خان) (1 September 1942 - 24 June 2024) was a Pakistani politician and retired army officer who was a member of the National Assembly of Pakistan in 1977 and from 1988 to 1990.

== Early life and education ==
Nisar Akbar Khan was born to father Chaudhry Ali Akbar Khan and mother Begum Ali Akbar Khan, as the eldest of his siblings. His family is of Rajput ancestry and originates from Faisalabad in Punjab, having settled in the city after emigrating from East Punjab's Hoshiarpur district during the partition of British India in 1947. His father was a Pakistan Movement activist who became a key figure in provincial and national politics, in addition to serving as Pakistan's ambassador to Sudan and Saudi Arabia.

Khan received his schooling from Lawrence College Ghora Gali before enrolling as a cadet at the Pakistan Military Academy.

== Military career ==
Khan graduated from the 28th PMA Long Course in October 1963, notably as a Sword of Honour recipient. He was commissioned as a second lieutenant in the 15th battalion of the Frontier Force Regiment. He retired from the Pakistan Army as a captain.

== Political career ==
Khan entered politics in the 1970 general election, contesting unsuccessfully for a seat in the National Assembly as a Pakistan Muslim League (PML) candidate. He then joined the Pakistan People's Party (PPP) and was successful in the 1977 general election, being elected to the lower house from his constituency of NA-70 (Lyallpur-III). He received 60,776 votes and defeated Muhammad Siddique Randhawa, a PNA candidate, by a margin of 15,000 votes. His tenure lasted from March to July, as a result of the military coup of 1977 which led to the dissolution of the assembly.

He did not stand in the non-party election of 1985, a poll boycotted by the PPP during martial law, in which the constituency was won by Muhammad Hanif Ansari. Following a return to democracy in the 1988 general election, Khan contested from the newly delimited constituency of NA-63 (Faisalabad-VII) and was re-elected. He received 54,251 votes and defeated Akram Ansari, an IJI candidate, by a margin of over 8,000 votes. He served his second term in parliament from November 1988 until the completion of his tenure in August 1990.

In the 1990 general election, he was allotted a different constituency by the PPP and went unelected, a move that allowed IJI's Akram Ansari to reclaim NA-63. In the 1993 general election, he returned to his former constituency. However, he received 48,796 votes and lost to Ansari, who was contesting on behalf of the PML-N this time, by around 14,000 votes. In the 1997 general election, the PPP decided to award its ticket for NA-63 to a former Faisalabad councillor, Riaz Ahmad Ansari, who was also defeated by Akram Ansari. In the 2002 general election, Khan contested from NA-82 (Faisalabad-VIII) on behalf of the parliamentarians wing of the PPP. He received 36,288 votes and lost by a narrow margin of fewer than 800 votes to Muhammad Fazal Karim, a PML-N candidate.

In October 2007, Khan parted ways with the PPP and became a member of the Pakistan Muslim League (N). In the 2008 general election, he campaigned from NA-81 (Faisalabad-VII). He received 23,305 votes and placed third in the poll behind runner-up Nisar Ahmad Jutt of the PML-Q, losing to PPP's winning candidate Chaudhry Saeed Iqbal. In the 2013 general election, he joined the Pakistan Tehreek-e-Insaf (PTI) and competed from NA-82 (Faisalabad-VIII). He received 36,373 votes, losing to PML-N's Rana Muhammad Afzal Khan by a margin of about 90,000 votes.

== Personal life ==
Khan married in 1962. His brother-in-law, Chaudhry Umar Daraz Khan, was elected as a member of the Punjab provincial assembly in 1977 and 1988.

National Assembly of Pakistan
Preceded by New seat	Member for NA-70 (Lyallpur-III); 1977	Succeeded by Muhammad Hanif Ansari
Preceded by Muhammad Hanif Ansari	Member for NA-63 (Faisalabad-VII); 1988–1990	Succeeded by Akram Ansari
