= Raja Nadir Pervez =

Pakistani army officer and politician (1942–2026)

- راجہ نادر پرویز
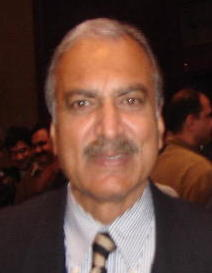
- Pervez in 2008

MNA for NA-85 Faisalabad-XI
- In office 2002–2007
- Preceded by: Constituency re-established
- Succeeded by: Muhammad Akram Ansari

MNA for NA-62 Faisalabad-VI
- In office 15 February 1997 – 12 October 1999
- Preceded by: Dildar Ahmed Cheema
- Succeeded by: Constituency re-established

MNA for NA-37 Rawalpindi-VI
- In office 15 October 1993 – 5 November 1996
- Preceded by: Raja Zaheer Khan
- Succeeded by: Khurshid Zaman

MNA for NA-58 Faisalabad-I
- In office 3 November 1990 – 18 July 1993
- Preceded by: Ghulam Mustafa Bajwa
- Succeeded by: Dildar Ahmed Cheema

MNA for NA-69 Faisalabad-IV
- In office 20 March 1985 – 29 May 1988
- Preceded by: Mian Zahid Sarfraz
- Succeeded by: Faisal Saleh Hayat

Minister of Communications
- In office 6 August 1998 – 12 October 1999
- Preceded by: Muhammad Azam Khan Hoti
- Succeeded by: Lt. Gen. Iftikhar Hussain Shah

Minister of State for Water and Power
- In office 1991–1993

Minister of Interior
- In office 28 July 1987 – 29 May 1988
- Preceded by: Wasim Sajjad
- Succeeded by: Malik Naseem Ahmad

Personal details
- Born: Raja Nadir Pervez Khan; 11 November 1942 Lyallpur, Punjab Province, British India (now Punjab, Pakistan)
- Died: January 2026 (aged 83) Faisalabad, Punjab, Pakistan
- Party: Pakistan Tehreek-e-Insaf (2013–2023); Pakistan Muslim League (N) (1993–2013); Islami Jamhoori Ittehad (1988–1993)
- Education: Pakistan Military Academy, Kakul
- Profession: Businessman, politician
- Awards: Sitara-e-Jurat

Military service
- Allegiance: Pakistan
- Branch/service: Pakistan Army
- Years of service: 1963–1974
- Rank: Major
- Unit: Punjab Regiment
- Battles/wars: Indo-Pakistani War of 1965; Indo-Pakistani War of 1971 (Bangladesh Liberation War)

Raja Nadir Pervez Khan (11 November 1942 – January 2026) was a Pakistani army officer and politician. An infantry officer of the Punjab Regiment, he was awarded the Sitara-e-Jurat for leading a raid on Sera Bet (Point 84) during the Indo-Pakistani War of 1965. Taken prisoner of war during the Indo-Pakistani War of 1971, he planned and along with four other officers successfully executed a 1972 escape from the Fatehgarh prisoner-of-war camp in India. After leaving the army, he was elected to the National Assembly of Pakistan five times between 1985 and 2007 and held several federal ministerial posts, serving as Minister of Communications in the second government of Nawaz Sharif.

== Military career ==
Pervez was commissioned into the 6th Battalion of the Punjab Regiment (6 Punjab) in April 1963. In March 1965, before the outbreak of hostilities between India and Pakistan, the battalion moved to the Rann of Kutch. On 17 April 1965, Pervez, then a lieutenant, led a party of 20 men in a raid on the Indian post at Sera Bet (Point 84); according to Pakistani military accounts, the raiders overran the position, killed around 20 Indian soldiers, and brought back a light machine gun and five rifles. He was awarded the Sitara-e-Jurat for the action, which has since been taught in Pakistan Army schools of instruction.

In 1971, as a major, Pervez commanded a company of 6 Punjab in the Boyra sector of East Pakistan. The unit was engaged in fighting there on 20–22 November 1971, in the Boyra–Garibpur area, shortly before the formal outbreak of the war. In December 1971, 6 Punjab, under the 107th Infantry Brigade, formed part of the defences of the Khulna garrison at Shiromoni in the south-western sector. Fighting there began with Indian air strikes and ground advances on 13 December and included Pakistani ambushes, among them an ambush of a convoy at Badamtala on 14 December; fighting continued even after the surrender of Pakistani forces on 16 December 1971. After their capture, the men of 6 Punjab, including Pervez, were moved to a prisoner-of-war camp at the Rajput Regimental Centre in Fatehgarh.

At Fatehgarh, Pervez planned an escape by tunnel. Work on a tunnel about 600 feet (180 m) long, running from near the middle of the camp towards the Ganges, began in the third week of January 1972 with a knife taken from the camp kitchen. The prisoners had to dispose of the excavated soil in secret and contend with a lack of oxygen inside the tunnel, which was only about 2 feet (0.61 m) wide, as well as with snakes and the risk of detection. The tunnel was completed on 6 September 1972, and five officers, including Pervez, escaped on the night of 16/17 September 1972.

== Political career ==
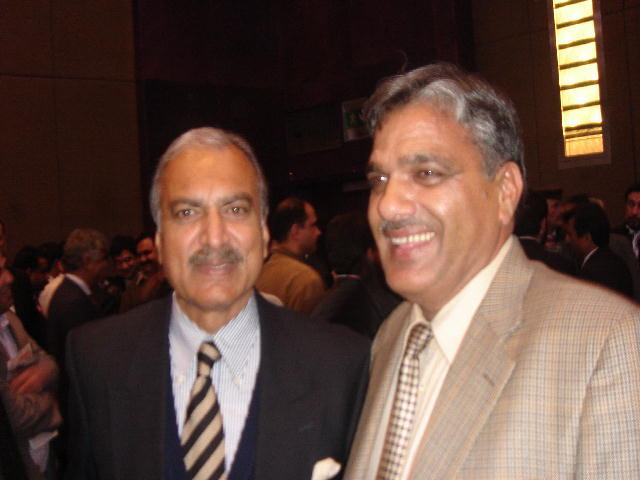
Pervez with Chaudhry Muhammad Barjees Tahir

After retiring from the army, Pervez pursued a career in politics. He was elected a Member of the National Assembly (MNA) for the terms 1985–1988, 1990–1993, 1993–1997, 1997–1999 and 2002–2007. He served as Federal Minister for Interior (1987–1988), Minister of State for Water and Power (1991–1993), and Federal Minister for Communications (1997–1999).

== Death ==
Pervez died in Faisalabad in January 2026, at the age of 83. His funeral prayers were offered at the Army Graveyard in Rawalpindi and were attended by military veterans, serving army officers, and other dignitaries.

== See also ==
- Prisoners of war during the Indo-Pakistani War of 1971
