= Markazi Sunni Rizvi Jamia Masjid =

Mosque in Faisalabad, Punjab, Pakistan

Markazi Sunni Rizvi Jamia Mosque

Religion
- Affiliation: Islam

Location
- Municipality: Faisalabad
- State: Punjab
- Country: Pakistan

Architecture
- Type: mosque
- Style: Mughal
- Established: 1950s

Markazi Sunni Rizvi Jamia Masjid is the central congregational masjid in Faisalabad, Punjab, Pakistan. It was built in Jhang Bazaar (one of the eight bazaars around the city's clock tower) in the early 1950s. It was founded by Sardar Ahmed Chishti and is the largest mosque by covered area in Faisalabad.

== Architecture ==
The building of the masjid is in the style of Mughal architecture.

The courtyard is paved with white marble and is wide open. The massive entrance is a white marble gate under a dome.

The veranda is about 150 feet long and 25 feet wide. Its walls are engraved with flowers and calligraphy. The calligraphy is in Khat-e-Nastaliq (The most prominent and popular Arabic script).

The masjid's hall is about 150 feet long and 70 feet wide and has 20 columns to support the roof. The columns are decorated with flower carvings and calligraphy. The front wall has a Mehrab. The beauty of this building is its outer look. Two minarets have been erected which are about two hundred meters high. Red marble has been used for their construction. In between them are three domes constructed with white marble. The aerial view of the Masjid is very much glorious and elegant. This masjid is the exact copy of the Badshahi Masjid of Lahore.

=== Services ===
More than ten thousand persons can perform their prayers at a time. During Jumma prayers and Eid prayers, the mosque is primarily overcrowded. It is also a center of other religious activities. More than two hundred students attend classes in religious studies. About one hundred students are here for Hifz (They learn and memorize the whole Quran by heart).
