= Hamid Raza =

Pakistani politician and religious scholar (born 1978)

Sahibzada Hamid Raza
- حامد رضا
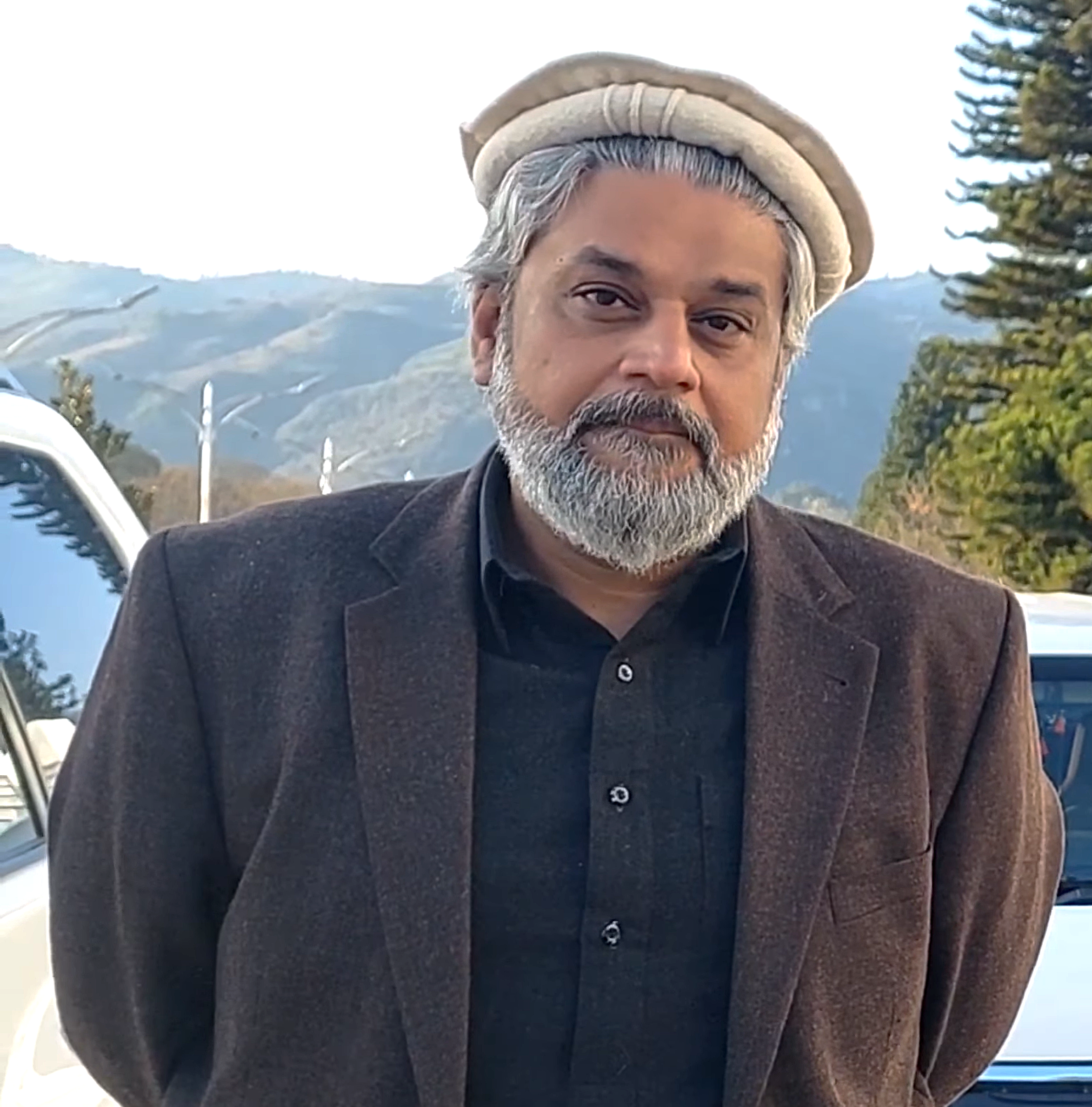
- Raza in 2024

Member of the National Assembly of Pakistan
- In office 29 February 2024 – 5 August 2025
- Succeeded by: Raja Daniyal Ahmed Khan
- Constituency: NA-104 Faisalabad-X

Party leader of SIC
- Incumbent
- Assumed office 2024

Personal details
- Born: Sahibzada Muhammad Hamid Raza Sayhul; 17 July 1978 (age 48) Lyallpur, Punjab, Pakistan
- Party: Sunni Ittihad Council (2009-present)
- Relations: Sardar Ahmad Chishti (grandfather)
- Parent: Muhammad Fazal Karim (father)

Muhammad Hamid Raza Sayhul (Note: Urdu: محمد حامد رضا سیہول) (born 17 July 1978) is a Pakistani politician and religious scholar who is the founder and chairman of the Sunni Ittihad Council (SIC) since 2013. He succeeded his father Fazal Karim as chairman of the SIC.

Raza served as a member of the National Assembly of Pakistan from February 2024 to August 2025 when he was disqualified by the Election Commission of Pakistan (ECP) for alleged involvement in the 9 May riots. In November 2025, he was arrested due to the conviction and sentanced 10-year imprisonment.

== Early life and family ==
Muhammad Hamid Raza Sayhul was born on 17 July 1978 in Lyallpur, Punjab, Pakistan to a family belonging to the Sayhul clan of Punjabi Jats. His father, Fazal Karim, was a religious scholar and politician who served as the main founder and leader of the Sunni Ittihad Council (SIC). Raza has four siblings; his paternal grandfather Sardar Ahmad Chishti having also been an influential religious figure.

== Political career ==
Raza was elected to the National Assembly of Pakistan in the 2024 Pakistani general election from NA-104 Faisalabad-X as an independent candidate supported by SIC. He received 132,655 votes while runner-up Daniyal Ahmed of PMLN received 92,610 votes.

In February 2024, he announced an alliance with PTI. Most PTI-backed independent candidates who won their MNA seats formally joined the PTI.

On 31 July 2025, Raza and 195 others were convicted by a court in Faisalabad and sentenced to up to 10 years' imprisonment over the 2023 Pakistani protests.

On 5 August 2025, Election Commission of Pakistan disqualified him due to his conviction.

In November 2025, Raza was arrested and sentenced a 10-year imprisonment for alleged involvement in the May 9 riots.

== Controversies ==
=== ISI attack ===
In May 2023, he was arrested related to ISI attack case.
