= Raja Daniyal Ahmed Khan =

Pakistani politician

Member of the National Assembly of Pakistan
- Incumbent
- Assumed office 27 November 2025
- Preceded by: Sahibzada Hamid Raza
- Constituency: NA-104 Faisalabad-X

Personal details
- Born: 3 January 1980 (age 46) Faisalabad
- Party: PMLN (2025-present)
- Parent: Raja Riaz (father)
- Occupation: Politician

Raja Daniyal Ahmed Khan (born 3 January 1980) is a Pakistani politician who has been a member of the National Assembly of Pakistan since 27 November 2025, he take oath as Member of Parliament on 27 November 2025.

He was elected to the National Assembly as a candidate of the Pakistan Muslim League (N) (PML-N) from Constituency NA-104 Faisalabad-VIII in a by-election held on 23 November 2025. He received 52,791 votes and defeated independent candidate Rana Adnan Javed, who received 19,262 votes. The seat became vacant due to the disqualification of a Pakistan Tehreek-e-Insaf (PTI) lawmaker following convictions related to the May 2023 riots.

== See also ==
- List of members of the 16th National Assembly of Pakistan
