= Raja Riaz =

Pakistani politician (born 1955)

- راجہ ریاض

Leader of the Opposition
- In office 20 May 2022 – 10 August 2023
- President: Arif Alvi
- Prime Minister: Shehbaz Sharif
- Preceded by: Shehbaz Sharif
- Succeeded by: Omar Ayub

Member of the National Assembly of Pakistan
- In office 13 August 2018 – 10 August 2023
- Constituency: NA-110 (Faisalabad-X)

Leader of the Opposition (Punjab)
- In office 2011–2013
- Succeeded by: Mehmood-ur-Rasheed

Senior Minister of Punjab
- In office 9 June 2008 – 1 March 2010

Provincial Minister of Punjab for Irrigation and Power
- In office 9 June 2008 – 1 March 2010

Member of the Provincial Assembly of Punjab
- In office 2008–2013
- In office 2002–2007
- In office 1993–1996
- Constituency: PP55 Faisalabad-XIII, PP65 Faisalabad-XV

Personal details
- Born: 26 July 1955 (age 71) Faisalabad, Punjab, Pakistan
- Party: PMLN (2023–2024); PPP (2022–2023); PTI (2016–2022); IND (2015–2016); PPP (1993–2015)

Punjab Assembly Lahore

Raja Riaz Ahmed Khan (born 26 July 1955) is a retired Pakistani politician who had been a member of the National Assembly of Pakistan from August 2018 till August 2023. Previously, he was the Punjab Minister for Irrigation and Power and also a member of the Provincial Assembly of the Punjab between 1993 and 2013. He was the leader of the opposition in the National Assembly of Pakistan from May 2022 till August 2023.

== Early life and education ==
He was born on 26 July 1955 in Faisalabad, Punjab, Pakistan.

He graduated from Government College University and has the degree of Bachelor of Arts.

== Political career ==
He was elected to the Provincial Assembly of the Punjab as a candidate of Pakistan Peoples Party (PPP) from Constituency PP-55 (Faisalabad-XIII) in the 1993 Pakistani general election. He received 30,655 votes and defeated Qamar Uz Zaman Awan, a candidate of Pakistan Muslim League (N) (PML(N)).

He ran for the seat of the Provincial Assembly of the Punjab as a candidate of PPP from Constituency PP-55 (Faisalabad-XIII) in the 1997 Pakistani general election, but was unsuccessful. He received 18,950 votes and lost the seat to Rana Muhammad Afzal Khan.

He was re-elected to the Provincial Assembly of the Punjab as a candidate of PPP from Constituency PP-65 (Faisalabad-XV) in the 2002 Pakistani general election. He received 27,788 votes and defeated Muhammad Saqib Malik, a candidate of PML(N).

He was re-elected to the Provincial Assembly of the Punjab as a candidate of PPP from Constituency PP-65 (Faisalabad-XV) in the 2008 Pakistani general election. He received 29,858 votes and defeated Haji Muhammad Shakeel Ansari, a candidate of PML(N). He was inducted into the provincial Punjab cabinet of Chief Minister Shahbaz Sharif as provincial minister for irrigation and power where he continued to serve until 2010.

He ran for the Provincial Assembly of the Punjab as a candidate of PPP from Constituency PP-65 (Faisalabad-XV) in the 2013 Pakistani general election, but was unsuccessful. He received 17,571 votes and lost the seat to Muhammad Ilyas Ansari.

He joined Pakistan Tehreek-e-Insaf (PTI) in May 2016.

He was elected to the National Assembly of Pakistan as a candidate of PTI from Constituency NA-110 (Faisalabad-X) in the 2018 Pakistani general election. securing 114,215 votes against the PML(N) candidate Rana Muhammad Afzal Khan who bagged 108,172 votes.

On 27 September 2018, Prime Minister Imran Khan appointed him as Federal Parliamentary Secretary for Petroleum. He resigned from this post in December 2018.

In March 2022, he was among the 20 PTI members of the National Assembly who, in opposition to the PTI leadership, joined the then opposition to pass a no-confidence motion against Prime Minister Imran Khan. In April 2022, the National Assembly of Pakistan passed this motion securing 174 votes in favour. Because the majority of PTI MPs resigned from parliament in protest, he was appointed leader of opposition in National Assembly of Pakistan on 20 May 2022, as the defunct group of PTI had 20 PTI members in National Assembly.

On 16 September 2023, he officially joined the PML(N).

He retired from active politics before 2024 Pakistani general election. His son, Raja Daniyal Ahmad, contested for National Assembly of Pakistan as a candidate of Pakistan Muslim League-N from Constituency NA-110 (Faisalabad-X) in 2024 Pakistani general election but was badly defeated by Sahibzada Hamid Raza of PTI. Raja Danial could secure only 44,215 votes against the Pakistan Tehreek-e-Insaf candidate Sahibzada Hamid Raza who bagged 108,220 votes. Sahibzada defeated Raja by a heavy margin of 64,005 Votes.

== See also ==
- List of members of the 15th National Assembly of Pakistan
