= Baba Qaim Sain =

Sufi saint

Personal life
- Born: unknown
- Died: 16 March 1987 Sidhupura Faisalabad, Pakistan
- Occupation: Sufism in Pakistan, Social work

Qaim Deen aka Baba Qaim Sain (Urdu بابا قائم سائیں سرکار ) was a Sufi saint in Faisalabad who belonged to the Qadiriyya and Qalandariyya spiritual orders. He died on 16 March 1987 (Islamic date 17 Rajab 1400). A road in Faisalabad is named after him. Baba Qaim Sain's tomb is located near Sidhupura area of Faisalabad. Next to the tomb is a large mosque and a cemetery.

== See also ==
- Baba Noor Shah Wali
- Baba Lasoori Shah
- بی بی مائی حاجن رحمت بی بی
