= Ijaz Ahmad Sehole =

Pakistani politician (born 1954)

- اعجاز احمد سیہول

Member of the Provincial Assembly of the Punjab
- In office 2002–2007
- Succeeded by: Muhammad Khurram Gulfam
- Constituency: PP-162 Sheikhupura-I

Personal details
- Born: 15 September 1954 (age 72) Sheikhupura, Punjab, Pakistan
- Party: Pakistan Muslim League
- Occupation: Politician, lawyer

Ijaz Ahmad Sehole (Note: Urdu: اعجاز احمد سیہول) (born 15 September 1954) is a Pakistani politician who served as a member of the Provincial Assembly of the Punjab from 2002 to 2007. He is a member of the Pakistan Muslim League.

== Biography ==
Sehole was born on 15 September 1954 in Sheikhupura, Punjab, Pakistan to a family of Punjabi Sayhul Jats. He completed his degree in mass communication from the University of the Punjab in 1979. Afterward, he studied law from Government Islamia Law College in Lahore.

He was elected to the Provincial Assembly of the Punjab as a candidate of the Pakistan Muslim League from Constituency PP-162 Sheikhupura-I in the 2002 provincial election. However, Sayhul lost his seat in the 2008 provincial election to Muhammad Khurram Gulfam of the Pakistan Muslim League (N), who got 28,019 votes in contrast to Sayhul's 6,523 votes.

== See also ==
- List of members of the 14th Provincial Assembly of the Punjab
