= Baba Noor Shah Wali =

- Country: Pakistan

Baba Syed Noor Shah Wali (Urdu بابا نور شاہ ولی العربی سرکار) shrine is located in Tariqabad neighborhood in Faisalabad, Pakistan. The shrine is around 400 years old, and is older than Faisalabad. It is surrounded by a large cemetery, and a large mosque is located next to the shrine.

The shrine is managed by the Punjab Auqaf and Religious Affairs Department.

== See also ==
- Baba Qaim Sain
- Baba Lasoori Shah
