= Muhammad Ibrahim Siddiqui =

Muhammad Ibrahim Khushtar Siddiqui
- Born: Muhammad Ibrahim Siddiqui; 8 March 1930; 24 Parganas, West Bengal, India
- Died: Hijri Date: 5th Jumada al-Ukhra 1423 Gregorian Date: August 14, 2002; Port Louis, Mauritius
- Resting place: Vallee Pitot, Port Louis, Mauritius
- Occupations: Missionary, writer, poet, Islamic teacher, imam
- Writing career
- Language: Urdu, English, Arabic, Farsi
- Notable work: Foundation of Sunni Razvi Society

Muhammad Ibrahim Khushtar Razvi Siddiqui (Urdu: محمد ابراہیم صدیقی; 8 March 1930 – 9 June 2002) was an Indian sufi saint and Islamic scholar belonging to the Barelvi movement of Sunni Islam. He was particularly influential in Mauritius, where he founded the Sunni Razvi Society.

== Early life ==
Siddiqui was born in 24 Parganas, West Bengal.

== Education, career and Sufi permissions ==
Siddiqui memorized the Quran by the age of 13 and graduated in Fazil-e-Darsi Nizami in 1956. He undertook his first Hajj with his teacher and guide, Muhaddith e Azam Pakistan Sardar Ahmad Chishti. He received successorship and teaching licences in 1957 from Shah Muhammad Ibrahim Raza Khan Jilani Mian in 1376 (1957) and was appointed as faculty at the Darul Uloom Rehmania and Jama Masjid Gukarkhan, as principal and Khateeb (lecturer).

He also received teaching licenses from Sufi master Ejaaz Wali Khan Razvi from Mustafa Raza Khan Qadiri Razvi Nuri, Ziauddeen Qadiri Razvi and from Sufi master Taqaddus Ali Khan (son-in-law of Hujjatul Islam).

== Service in Mauritius ==
In 1965, Siddiqui established the Sunni Razvi Society International in Mauritius, formed on the directions of Mustafa Raza Khan Qadri. The organisation spread to France, Holland, Kenya, Pakistan, Sri-Lanka, Suriname and South Africa. During his 1970 visit to Durban, South Africa, he gave lectures on the importance and significance of loving the Islamic prophet Muhammad and debated with Tablighi Jamaat members.

Siddiqui has composed and sung in praise of Mauritius, especially when it gained independence and its status as a republic.

His friends included the Governor-general, Leonard Williams and Sir Raman Osman, former Prime Minister of Mauritius Seewoosagur Ramgoolam, Anerood Jugnauth, A. Pasooraman (Minister Of Education, Arts and Culture).

He began organizing continuous weekly Thursday study circles at the Jummah Mosque. On 20 February 1983, Siddiqui laid the foundation stone on a large piece of land which had been donated by a disciple. The first weekly study circle occurred on 14 April 1983 under his patronage.

== Works ==
His works include:

- Path of Salvation
- Maqaam-e-Siddiq-e-Akbar Ba Kalaam-e-Ibrahim Khushtar- a biography of Abu Bakr.
- On the Holiest Earth of Islam - Guidance for Hajj and Umrah.
- Fragrance of Khushtar - Islamic poetry book
- Preparations for Death
- Mystical teachings

== External sources ==
- Official website of the Sunni Razvi Society
