= Dasuha, Faisalabad =

Coordinates: 31°19′N 73°02′E

Dasuha (Urdu: دسوہا) is a small city of Faisalabad district, in central Punjab, Pakistan. It is approximately 13 km from the city of Faisalabad and some 30 km from Samundri on the Faisalabad–Samundri Road.
