= Tariqabad =

Neighbourhood in Faisalabad, Pakistan

- neighbourhood in Faisalabad
- Location within Pakistan
- Coordinates: 30°53′05″N 72°26′25″E
- Country: Pakistan
- Province: Punjab
- District: Faisalabad
- Time zone: UTC+5 (PST)

Tariqabad (Urdu: طارق آباد) is a neighborhood located in Faisalabad, Punjab, Pakistan. The Faisalabad railway station is located in the town. Tariqabad is one of the oldest towns of Faisalabad.

== Education ==
- Fatima Jinnah Degree College for Women, Tariqabad, Faisalabad
- Government Muslim High School, Tariqabad, Faisalabad
