= Rana Muhammad Afzal Khan =

Pakistani politician (1949–2018)

Rana Afzal Khan
- رانا افضل خان
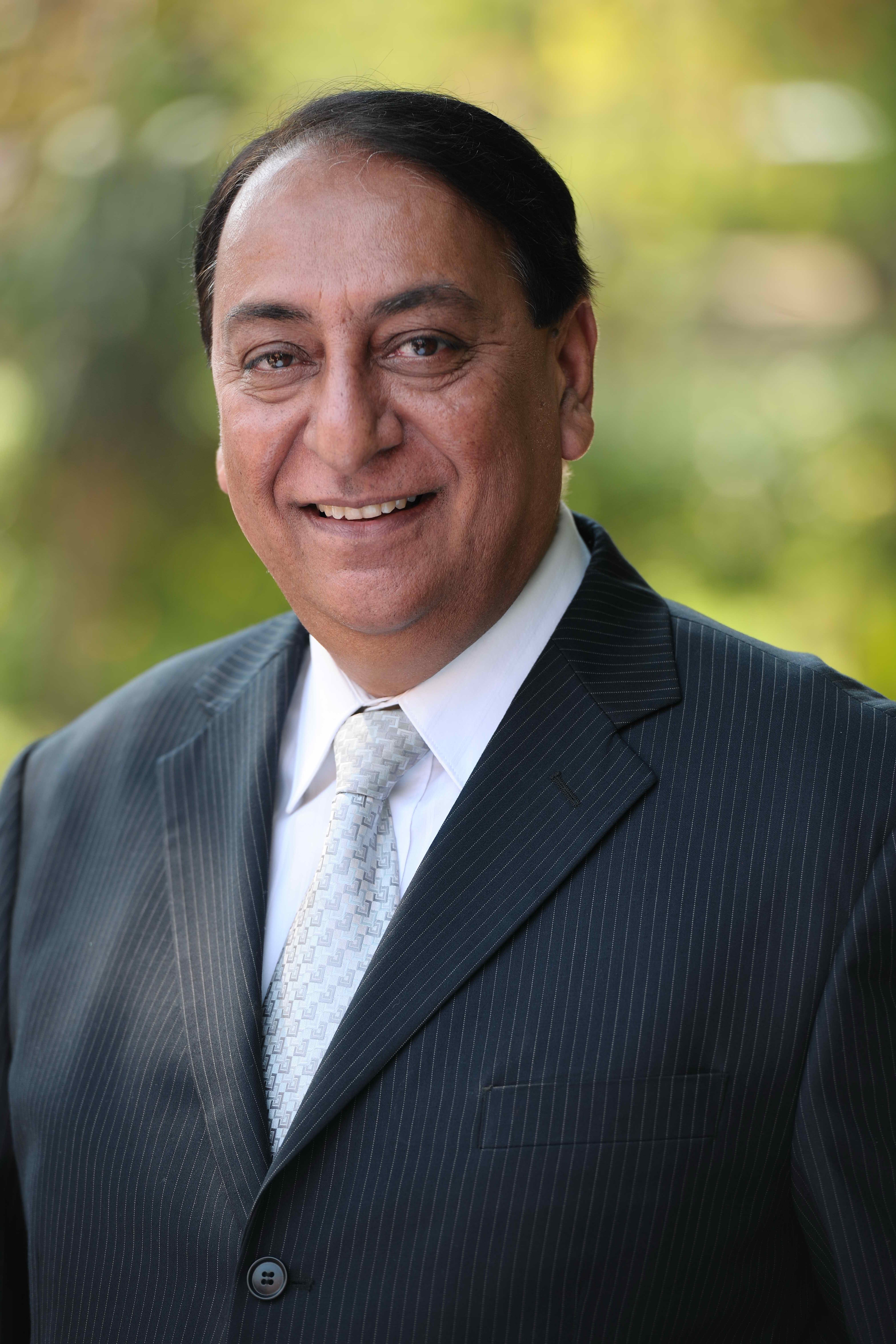

Minister of State for Finance and Economic Affairs
- In office 26 December 2017 – 31 May 2018
- Prime Minister: Shahid Khaqan Abbasi
- Minister: Miftah Ismail

Member of the National Assembly of Pakistan
- In office 1 June 2013 – 31 May 2018
- Constituency: NA-82 (Faisalabad)

Member of the Provincial Assembly of Punjab
- In office 9 April 2008 – 16 March 2013
- In office 1997–1999

Personal details
- Born: 22 February 1949 Lyallpur, West Punjab, Pakistan
- Died: 27 September 2018 (aged 69) Faisalabad, Punjab, Pakistan
- Party: Pakistan Muslim League (N)
- Spouse: Dr. Najma Afzal Khan
- Children: 4
- Education: NED University of Engineering and Technology; University of Balochistan

Military service
- Branch/service: Pakistan Army
- Years of service: 1971–1976
- Rank: Captain

Rana Muhammad Afzal Khan (Urdu: رانا محمد افضل خان; 22 February 1949 – 27 September 2018) was a Pakistani politician, businessman and Army officer who served as leader of PML-N, and Minister of State for Finance and Economic Affairs in the Abbasi cabinet from December 2017 to May 2018. He was a member of the National Assembly of Pakistan, from June 2013 to May 2018, where he was the Parliamentary Secretary for Finance, Revenue and Privatisation. Previously, he was a Member of the Provincial Assembly of Punjab from 1997 to 1999 and again from 2008 to 2013.

He was the founder of Saahil Limited, a family run corporation involved in health, schools and manufacturing. His sons had been managing operations of the company while Rana Afzal Khan held elected office.

== Early life and education ==
Khan was born on 22 February 1949 in Faisalabad to Major Fazal Muhammad Khan.

He received his early education from Dhaka, East Pakistan.

Khan received B.Sc. degree in electrical engineering from the NED University of Engineering and Technology in 1971 and completed MA in Political Science from the University of Balochistan.

After graduation from N.E.D he got commissioned in Pak army but resigned for personal reasons within a span of six years.

== Military and early political career ==
Khan served in the Pakistan Army as a captain from 1971 to 1976.

Prior to starting political career, Khan served in the executive committee of Faisalabad Chamber of Commerce & Industry and as vice chairman of Water and Sanitation Agency.

== Business career ==
Khan was invited to join PML-N following his successful Business career in Pakistan and Saudi Arabia. He was a Vice President of a British-American company in Saudi Arabia, before returning to Pakistan.

In Pakistan, he founded and Chaired the Saahil Group, a Company which expanded into the Manufacturing, Real Estate, Education and Health Industries through its subsidiaries, run in part by his sons, Inaam and Ihsaan. Saahil Group also operates Saahil Hospital, a Medical Facility in the city of Faisalabad.

== Punjab Political Career ==
Khan was elected to the Provincial Assembly of Punjab as a candidate of Pakistan Muslim League (N) (PML-N) from Constituency PP-55 (Faisalabad) in the 1997 Pakistani general election. He received 32,402 votes and defeated Raja Riaz Ahmad, a candidate of Pakistan Peoples Party (PPP).

Khan ran for the seat of the Provincial Assembly of Punjab as a candidate of PML-N from Constituency PP-66 (Faisalabad-XVI) in the 2002 Pakistani general election but was unsuccessful. He received 17,779 votes and lost the seat to Riaz Shahid, a candidate of PPP.

While Pervez Musharraf was in charge, Khan was one of approximately 50 elected officials of PML-N who remained in power without resigning or converting parties.

Khan was re-elected to the Provincial Assembly of Punjab as a candidate of PML-N from Constituency PP-66 (Faisalabad-XVI) in the 2008 Pakistani general election. He received 34,487 votes and defeated Riaz Shahid, a candidate of PPP.

== National Political Career ==
He was elected to the National Assembly of Pakistan as a candidate of PML-N from Constituency NA-82 (Faisalabad-VIII) in the 2013 Pakistani general election. He received 126,426 votes and defeated Nisar Akbar Khan, a candidate of Pakistan Tehreek-e-Insaf.

In December 2013, he was appointed Federal Parliamentary Secretary for Finance, Revenue, Economic Affairs, Statistics and Privatization. After Minister for Finance Ishaq Dar took a medical leave in November 2017 before stepping down from the office, Khan was considered for the slot of Minister of State for Finance. After pressure on the federal government to fill the office of finance minister which was vacant for a month, Khan was inducted on 22 December 2017 into the federal cabinet of Prime Minister Shahid Khaqan Abbasi after he was approved for the appointment of Minister of State for Finance with the additional charge of economic division. Khan said that Ishaq Dar recommended his name for the slot of minister of state for finance. Khan's appointment came at time when country was advancing towards a balance of payment crises. He took oath as minister of state for finance and Economic Affairs on 26 December. Upon the dissolution of the National Assembly on the expiration of its term on 31 May 2018, Khan ceased to hold the office as Minister of State for Finance and Economic Affairs.

After the 2018 General Election, Khan served as Senior Leader of PML-N and regularly appeared on news channels to discuss the day's political events. It was speculated that he would attempt to return to elected office in the 2023 general election, as a Senate candidate.

== Family and personal life ==
Khan was married to Dr. Najma Afzal Khan. He had two sons and two daughters.

His elder daughter, Aliya Afzal Khan, is a businesswoman and politician in the United Kingdom who has served as Councillor for Palace & Hurlingham since May 2022, and Co-CEO of Edison Technologies since July 2020. His sons, Inaam Afzal Khan and Ihsaan 'Sunny' Afzal Khan, are businessmen based in Faisalabad whereas his fourth child, Hina Afzal Khan, is a doctor who lives in the United States. Ihsaan Afzal Khan additionally serves as a PML-N leader, member of the party's Central Working Committee, Additional General Secretary of the National Youth Wing, and member of the Economic Advisory Council.

== Death and legacy ==
Rana Afzal Khan was described by his colleagues in PMLN as a 'fierce advocate for Democracy'. His funeral was attended by tens of thousands of people in the city of Faisalabad. He was known for having firm principles, but being able to compromise in order to achieve legislative progress; both members of PMLN and PTI have paid tribute to him on social media.

A few days prior to his death, he suffered from angina pain and was admitted to AFIC hospital in Faisalabad.

Hospitals sources said that Afzal Khan, who had also served as the state minister during the PML-N government, was placed on a ventilator after his health deteriorated but he did not survive.

After his death, Opposition leader Shahbaz Sharif tweeted his condolences and praised Khan as a champion of Democracy. The Incumbent President of Pakistan, Arif Alvi called the family of Afzal Khan, expressing his condolences and describing Khan as a 'Great man'. Incumbent Prime Minister Imran Khan held a prayer for Rana Afzal Khan at the Cabinet meeting that took place after his death.
