= Faisalabad–Samundri Road =

Road in Punjab, Pakistan

Faisalabad-Samundri Road فیصل آباد – سمندری سڑک

Route information
- Maintained by Punjab Highway Department
- Length: 43 km (27 mi)

Major junctions
- From: Samanabad, Faisalabad; Dasuha
- To: Samundri

Location
- Country: Pakistan

Highway system
- Roads in Pakistan

Faisalabad–Samundri Road (Punjabi, Urdu: فیصل آباد – سمندری سڑک), also known locally as Sumundri Road is a provincially maintained road in Punjab, Pakistan, that extends from Faisalabad to Samundri.

== Salient features ==
Length: 43 km

Lanes: 4 lanes

Speed limit: Universal minimum speed limit of 60 km/h and a maximum speed limit of 80 km/h for heavy transport vehicles and 100 km/h for light transport vehicles.
