= Akram Ansari =

Pakistani politician (born 1954)

The Honourable Akram Ansari MNA

Minister of State for Commerce and Textile
- In office 4 August 2017 – 31 May 2018
- President: Mamnoon Hussain
- Prime Minister: Shahid Khaqan Abbasi
- Constituency: NA-85 (Faisalabad-XI)

Member of the National Assembly of Pakistan
- In office 2008 – 31 May 2018
- Constituency: NA-85 (Faisalabad-XI)
- In office 1990–1999
- Constituency: NA-63 (Faisalabad)

Personal details
- Born: 4 April 1954 (age 72)
- Party: PMLN
- Other political affiliations: IJI

Akram Ansari (Urdu: اکرم انصاری; born 4 April 1954) is a Pakistani politician who served as Minister of State for Commerce and Textile, in Abbasi cabinet from August 2017 to May 2018. He had been a member of the National Assembly of Pakistan, from 1990 to 1999 and again from 2008 to May 2018.

== Early life ==
He was born on 4 April 1954.

== Political career ==
He ran for a seat in the National Assembly of Pakistan as a candidate for Constituency NA-63 (Faisalabad-VII) in the non-party 1985 Pakistani by-election and was elected as an MNA. He ran for the seat of the National Assembly of Pakistan as a candidate for Islami Jamhoori Ittehad (IJI) for Constituency NA-63 (Faisalabad-VII) in the 1988 Pakistani general election but was unsuccessful, losing to Nisar Akbar Khan.

He was elected to the National Assembly as a candidate for IJI for Constituency NA-63 (Faisalabad-VII) in the 1990 Pakistani general election. He received 60,983 votes.

He was re-elected to the National Assembly as a candidate for Pakistan Muslim League (N) (PML-N) for Constituency NA-63 (Faisalabad-VII) in the 1993 Pakistani general election. He received 62,592 votes.

He was re-elected to the National Assembly as a candidate for PML-N for Constituency NA-63 (Faisalabad-VII) in the 1997 Pakistani general election. He received 62,963 votes.

Ansari could not run in the 2002 general election due not having a degree.

Ansari was re-elected to the National Assembly as a candidate for PML-N for Constituency NA-85 (Faisalabad-XI) in the 2008 Pakistani general election. He secured 72197 votes.

He was re-elected to the National Assembly as a candidate for PML-N for Constituency NA-85 (Faisalabad-XI) in the 2013 Pakistani general election.

Following the election of Shahid Khaqan Abbasi as Prime Minister of Pakistan in August 2017, he was inducted into the federal cabinet of Abbasi. He was appointed as the Minister of State for Commerce and Textile. Upon the dissolution of the National Assembly on the expiration of its term on 31 May 2018, Ansari ceased to hold the office as Minister of State for Commerce and Textile.
