= Sunni Ittihad Council =

Sunni Ittihad Council سنی اتحاد کونسل
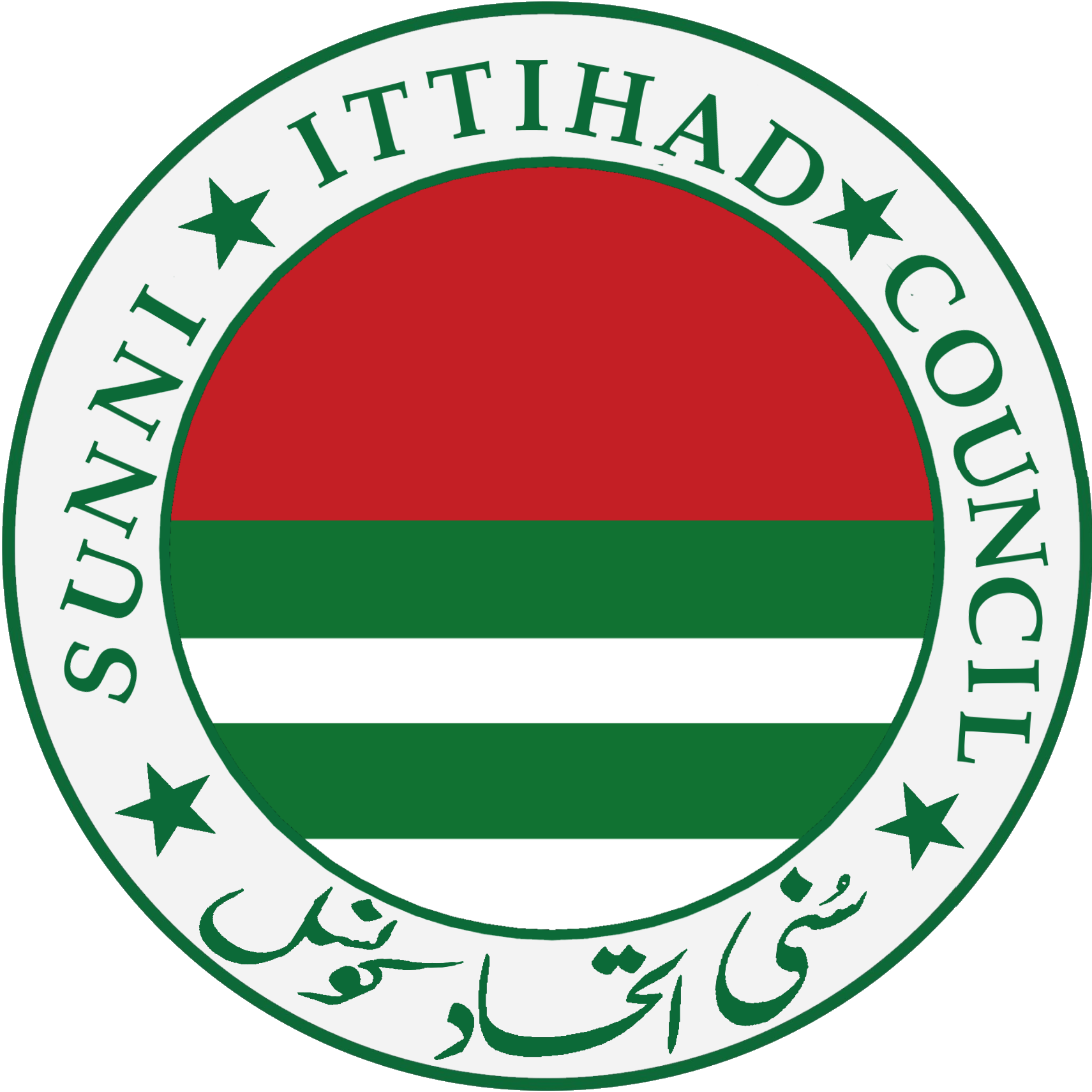
- Abbreviation: SIC
- Leader: Hamid Raza
- Founder: Fazal Karim
- Founded: 2009; 17 years ago
- Ideology: Pan-Islamism; Sunni Islamism; Barelvism
- Political position: Right-wing
- Religion: Sunni Islam (Barelvi)
- National affiliation: DPC
- Senate of Pakistan: 1 / 96
- National Assembly of Pakistan: 1 / 336
- Provincial Assembly of Balochistan: 0 / 65
- Provincial Assembly of Khyber Pakhtunkhwa: 1 / 145
- Provincial Assembly of Sindh: 0 / 168
- Provincial Assembly of Punjab: 75 / 371
- Gilgit-Baltistan Assembly: 0 / 33
- Azad Kashmir Legislative Assembly: 0 / 53

Election symbol
- Horse

Party flag
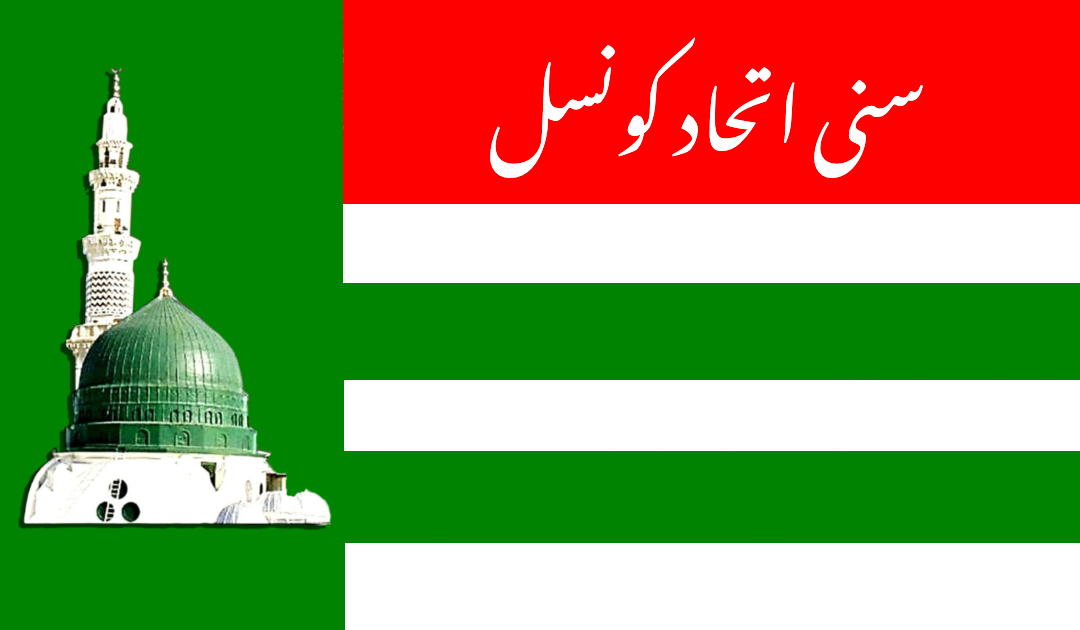

The Sunni Ittihad Council (SIC) (Note: Ittihad in Urdu for "unity", from al-Ittihad in Arabic meaning "united" or "jointly") is a Pakistani political party with a right-wing political position. It was founded as a political alliance of several Islamist and Sunni Barelvi religious parties in Pakistan.

The SIC was founded in early 2009 by Fazal Karim in Faisalabad with the stated aim of promoting moderate Islam and Sufism in opposition to Islamic extremism and so-called "Talibanization" efforts in parts of Pakistan. The SIC led campaigns voicing support for Pakistani operations against militants while also staunchly opposing NATO drone strikes in Pakistan. In December 2011, the SIC joined the "Protect Pakistan" organization in the aftermath of the Salala incident. After the death of Karim, his son Hamid Raza became chairman of the SIC in 2013. Raza was arrested in 2025 for alleged involvement in the May 9 riots and currently remains in prison. His brother and SIC vice chairman Hasan Raza currently serves as the de facto chairman.

The party maintained a relatively low-profile until the 2024 general election when it won one seat and the winning independent candidates supported by the Pakistan Tehreek-e-Insaf (PTI) joined the party at Imran Khan's behest.

== History ==
SIC was formed in 2009 in its head office 3 Malik Road Faisalabad and the current member parties of the Sunni Ittihad Counci. The Sunni Ittihad Council was founded in 2009 by a number of Sunni scholars, including Fazal Karim. In December 2011, the SIC launched a countrywide "Difa-e-Pakistan campaign" to create public awareness against NATO attacks on Pakistan's border military posts in Mohmand Agency. They also decided to hold a "Condemn America Day" on the 23rd of that month. Those NATO attacks killed over two dozens Pakistani soldiers.

Sunni Ittihad Council's chairman, Sahibzada Fazal Kareem, presided this decision wherein it was taken at an 'All Parties Conference' of many parties of Ahle Sunnat school of thought.

The US government website Usaspending.gov shows that the Sunni Ittihad Council received $36,607 from Washington in 2009. Sunni Ittihad Council had organized anti-Taliban rallies in Pakistan in the past. But the council later demonstrated in support of Mumtaz Qadri who killed the liberal politician Salman Taseer for his criticism of anti-blasphemy laws in Pakistan. According to a Hudson Institute report, "A few days after the assassination, leading religious groups led a demonstration of over fifty thousand people in Karachi in support of the blasphemy law. During the rally, Qadri was lionized as a Muslim hero, while rally leaders sternly warned the crowds against mourning Taseer, whom they claimed had deviated from Islam."

Due to some political divisions, the Sunni Ittihad Council broke into two. One faction, led by Sayyid Muhammad Mahfooz Shah Sahib of Bhikki Shareef, declared that Sahibza Conference Kareem and Haji Hanif Tayyab had been removed from their positions due to an attempt to create an alliance with the PML(Q) without the prior permission of the member parties of the Sunni Ittihad Council, along with a host of other allegations.

Sahibzada Fazal Karim, therefore, established one group Sunni Ittihad Council (F), while Sayyid Mahfzooz Shah made another group called Sunni Ittihad Council (M). Fazal Kareem later died and the leadership of the Sunni Ittihad Council (F) was given to Sahibzada Hamid Raza.

In September 2011, the SIC reacted to rumors that the United States might invade Pakistan in an attempt to put down terrorist networks in the country. The Council issued a fatwa, stating that jihad against the US would become obligatory, where the country would encroach upon Pakistani soil, urging the Pakistani government to prepare the nation for a holy war "in the way of God."

On 12 October 2012, a group of 50 Islamic clerics in Pakistan issued a fatwā against the Taliban gunmen who tried to kill Malala Yousafzai. Islamic scholars from the Sunni Ittihad Council publicly denounced attempts by the Pakistani Taliban to mount religious justifications for the shooting of Yousafzai and two of her classmates.

On 19 February 2024, PTI leader Gohar Ali Khan announced that its party-backed independent candidates in the 2024 general election would join Sunni Ittihad Council (SIC) as part of their parliamentary strategy.

Pakistan Tehreek-e-Insaf (PTI) submitted on 22 February the joining certificates of independent members aligning with the Sunni Ittihad Council (SIC) to the Election Commission of Pakistan (ECP). According to details provided by the PTI Secretariat, a total of 86 independent members have pledged allegiance to the Sunni Ittihad Council for the National Assembly. Simultaneously, certificates of 105 members of the SIC for the Punjab Assembly and 85 members of the Khyber Pakhtunkhwa Assembly have been submitted. Moreover, the joining certificates of 9 independent members of the Sindh Assembly have also been presented to the Election Commission, further solidifying the SIC's presence in key legislative bodies.

In November 2025, SIC chairman Hamid Raza was arrested to a 10-year sentence in prison for alleged involvement in the May 9 riots. His brother and vice chairman, Hasan Raza, confirmed it.

== Ideology ==
As the Sunni Ittihad Council is an alliance of several religious parties, it follows right-wing politics, and advocates for the involvement of religion in politics. The party follows the Sunni Islam denomination of Islam, and as Sunni parties do, the SIC preaches the Sunnah of the Islamic Muhammad in Islam to be implemented, mostly to the Pakistani government. Although the party follows the Barelvi movement and Sunni school of thought of Islam, it has joined hands with parties of other denominations of Islam, most recently with the Shia Islam party, the MWM, under mediation by the SIC's ally, the PTI.

The party has also openly criticized both the Taliban and the United States military involvement in Pakistan, while also heavily participating in anti-terrorism efforts.

Following the 2022–2024 political unrest in Pakistan, the SIC voiced support for Imran Khan and the PTI. The SIC is heavily involved in supporting Imran Khan especially after the 2024 Pakistani general election.
