= Muhammad Fazal Karim =

Pakistani politician

Sahibzada Muhammad Fazal Karim

Assembly Member for Constituency NA-82
- In office 2002–2007
- In office 2008–2013

Personal details
- Born: 24 October 1954 Faisalabad
- Died: 15 April 2013 (aged 58) Faisalabad
- Party: Pakistan Muslim League N
- Other political affiliations: Sunni Ittehad Council

Sahibzada Haji Muhammad Fazal Karim (24 October 1954 – 15 April 2013) was a Pakistani religious leader and politician who belonged to an intellectual and spiritual family of Islamic scholars.

He was a senior and the most vocal member of Pakistan Muslim League (N), from which he separated later on, for not adopting a principled stand against terrorism. He was elected as founder General Secretary of Jamat e Ahle Sunnat Pakistan in 1978 and later served as Senior Vice President of Jamiat Ulema-e-Pakistan (JUP).

He was elected from Faisalabad, twice as a member of the Provincial Assembly and twice as Member of National Assembly from 1993 to 2013 (till his death). He also served as Minister for Auqaf and Religious Affairs as well as Chairman, 'Muttahida Ulema Board Punjab'. He was also the Founder Chairman of the Sunni Ittehad Council, which is an amalgamation of several Barelivi parties across the globe.

== Early life ==
Fazal Karim was born on 24 October 1954 at Faisalabad. He was son of Islamic scholar Sardar Ahmad Chishti. He did his post graduation in Islamic studies from 'Jamia Rizvia' in the year 1987.

== Political career ==
Karim got elected to the Provincial Assembly of Punjab in 1993 as a member of Pakistan Muslim League (N) and remained till the dissolution of the assembly in 1997. He held the office of Provincial Minister for Religious Affairs during this tenure. In 2002 he got elected on Pakistan Muslim League (N)'s ticket from NA-82 this time for the National Assembly of Pakistan and completed his five-year term. He was again elected in 2008 from the same constituency. Under his leadership SIC started long March named, Labaik Ya Rasool Allah صلى الله تعالى عليه وآله وسلم long march with the support of Jamaat Ahle Sunnat, the Sunni Tehreek and Jamia Ulema Pakistan. Karim stated his view that Pakistan is not a secular country, but rather an Islamic state, and "we will continue our efforts till the enforcement of Islamic law in the country established in the name of Allah after numerous sacrifices."

== Death ==
Suffering from liver cancer, he was hospitalised in Faisalabad in critical condition on 4 April 2013, and died on 15 April 2013.

PML-N President Nawaz Sharif, Punjab Chief Minister Najam Sethi, former chief minister Shahbaz Sharif, and other dignitaries sent their condolences. Pakistan Sunni Tehreek also announced mourning and suspension of political activities for three days. Among his survivors are his four sons - Hamid Raza, Hussain Raza, Hassan Raza and Mohsin Raza and a daughter.
