= Sufism in Pakistan =

History of Islamic mysticism in Pakistan

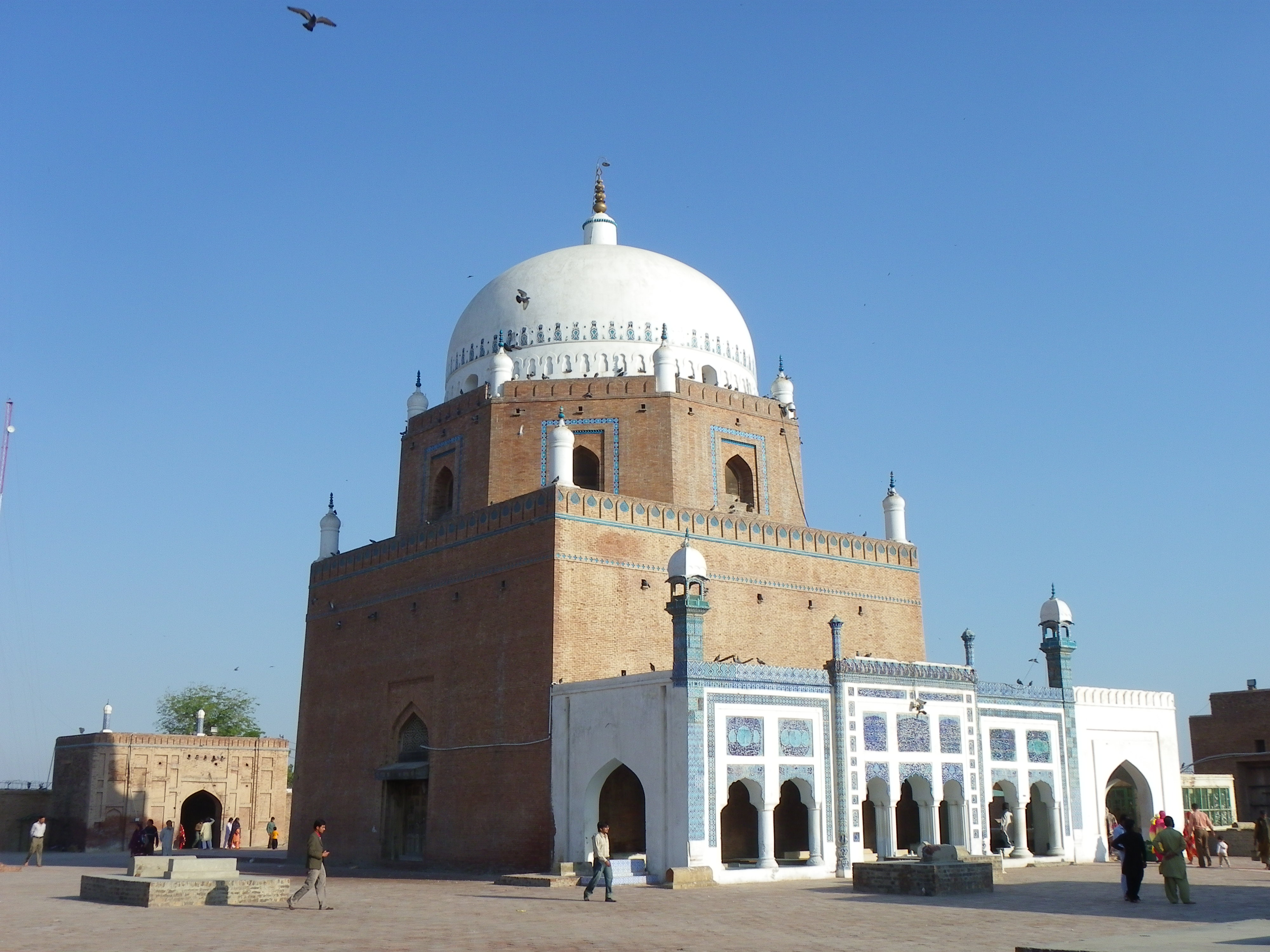
Tomb of Bahauddin Zikarya in Multan, Punjab

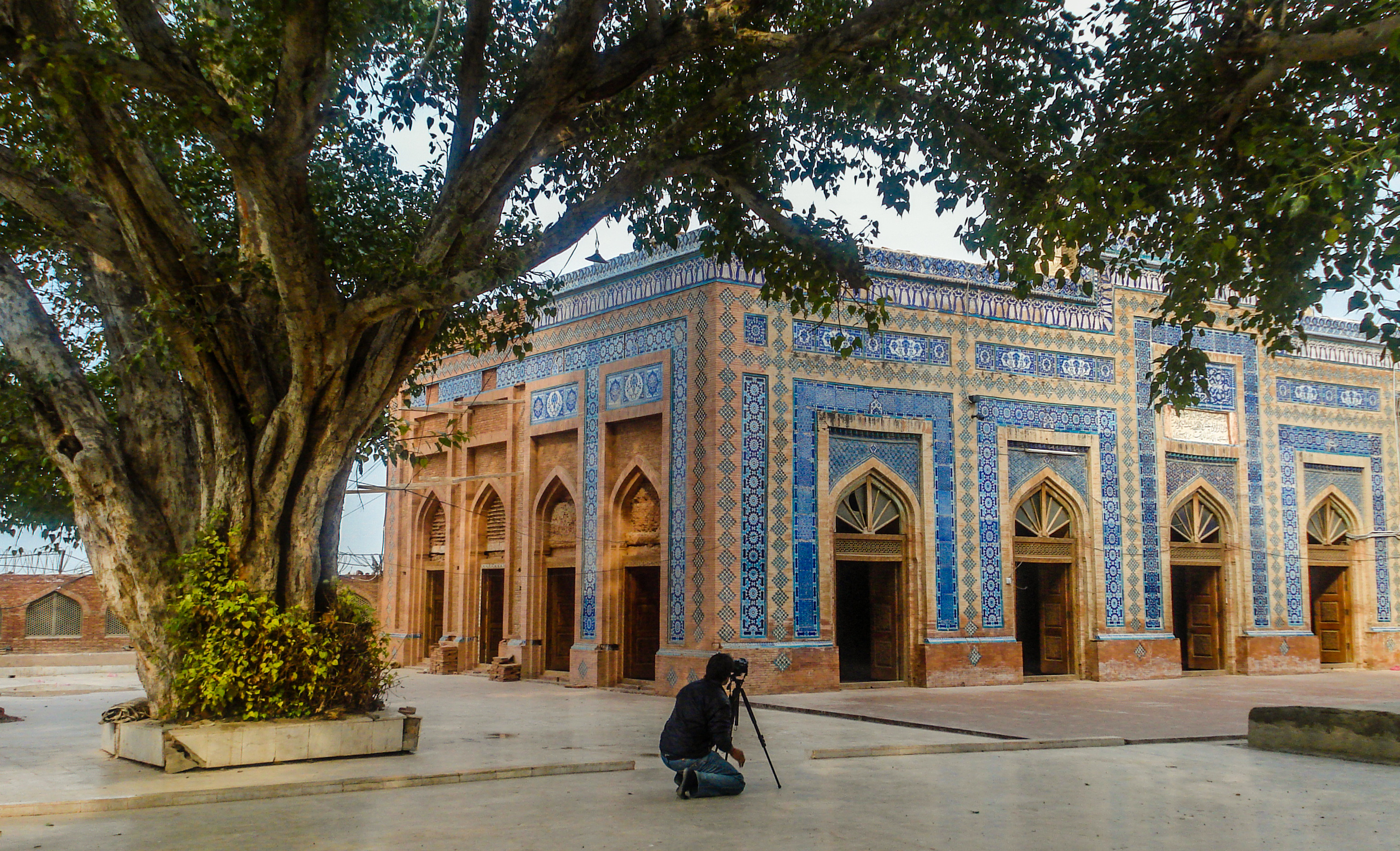
Tomb: Syed Jalaluddin Surkh-Posh Bukhari

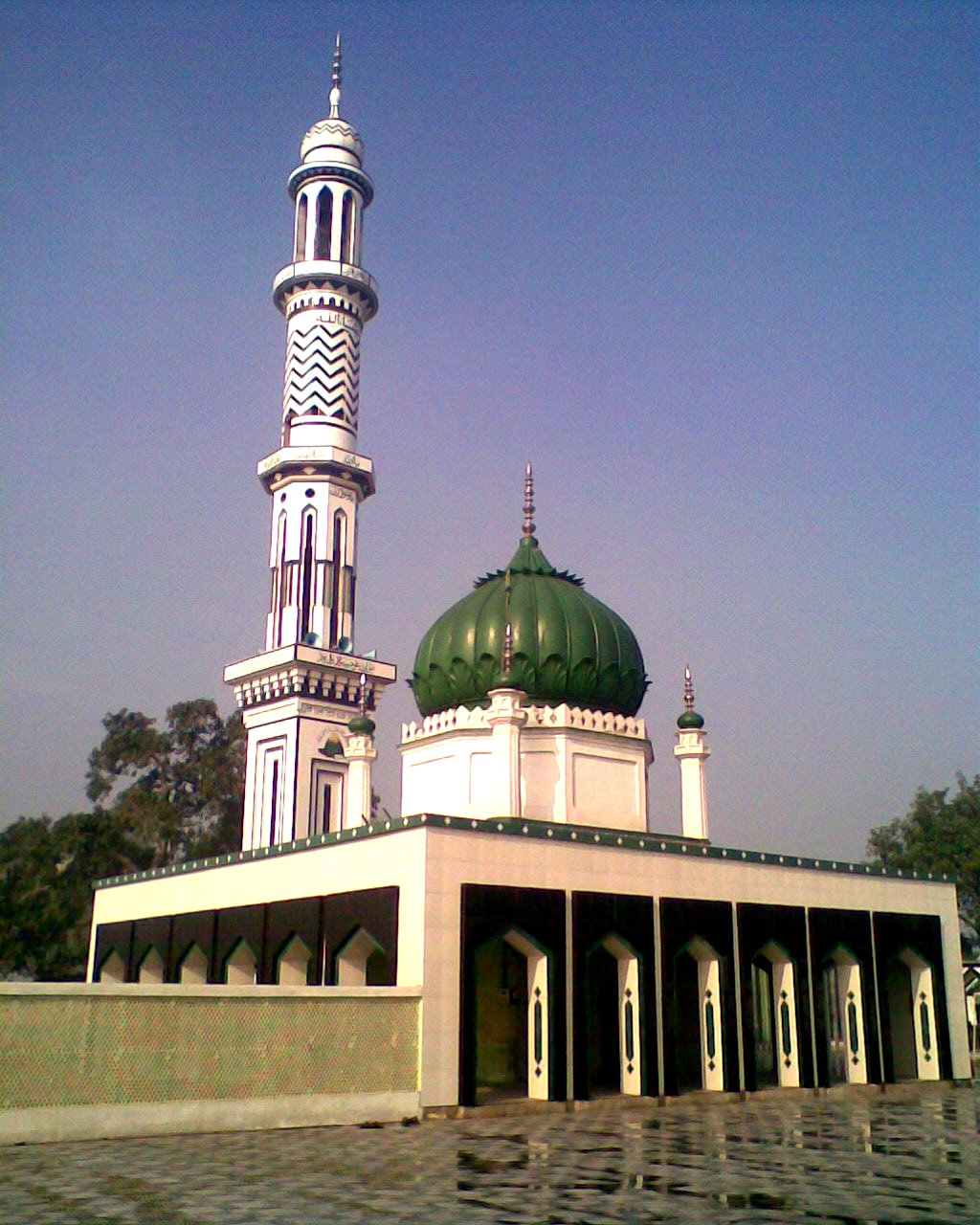
Shrine of Islamic Naqshbandi saints of Allo Mahar Sharif

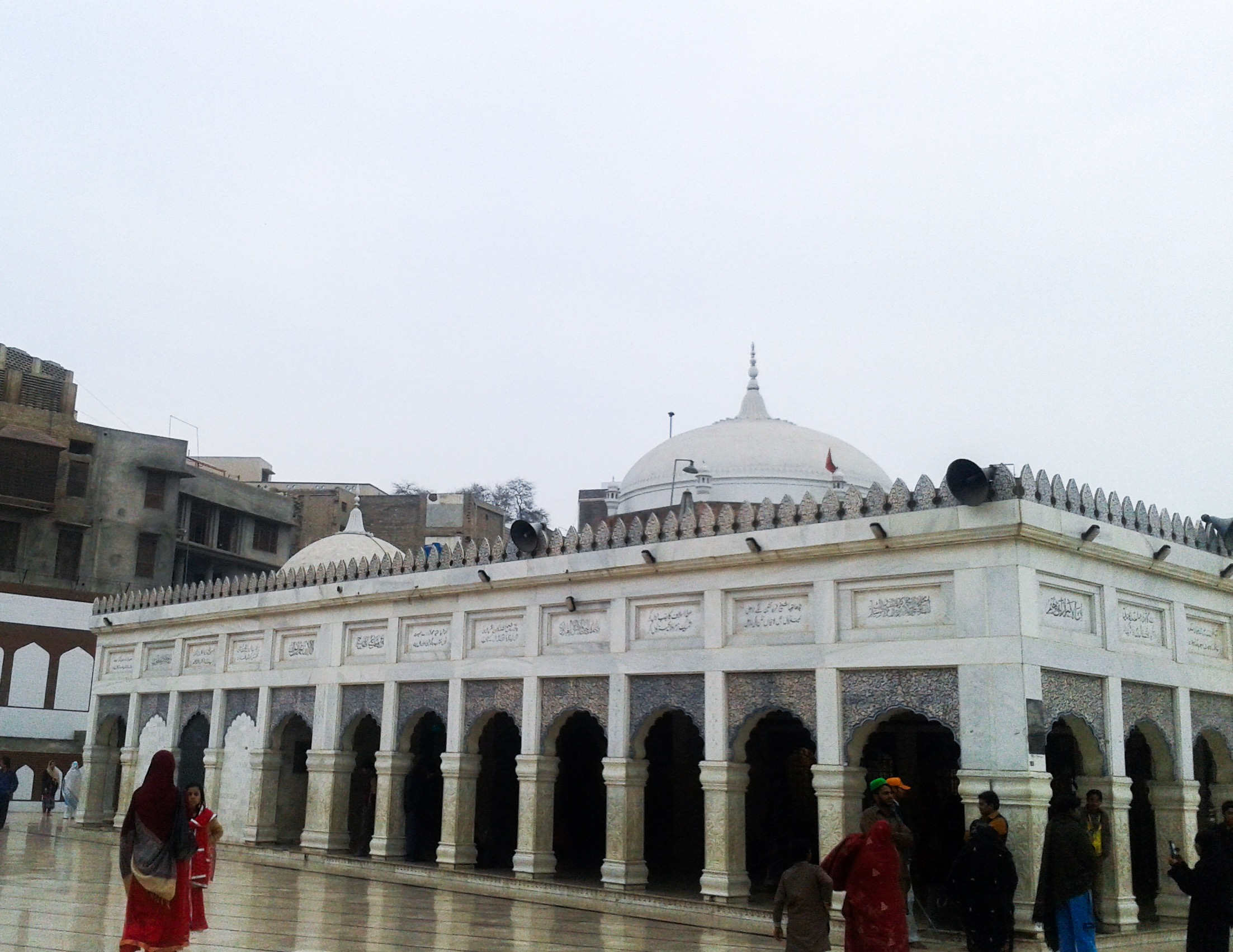
Tomb of Fariduddin Ganjshakar

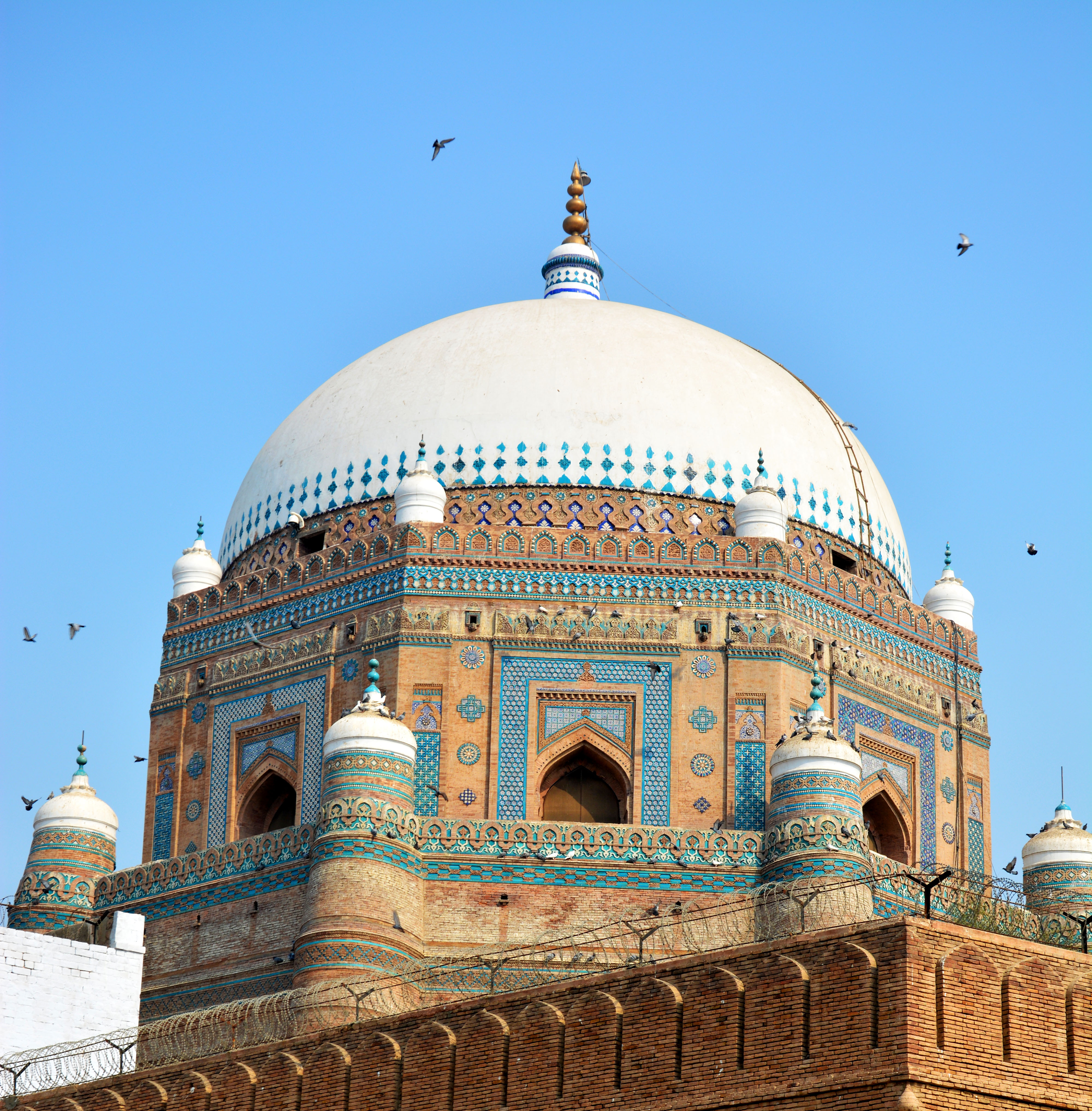
Tomb of Shah Rukn-e-Alam, Multan, Punjab

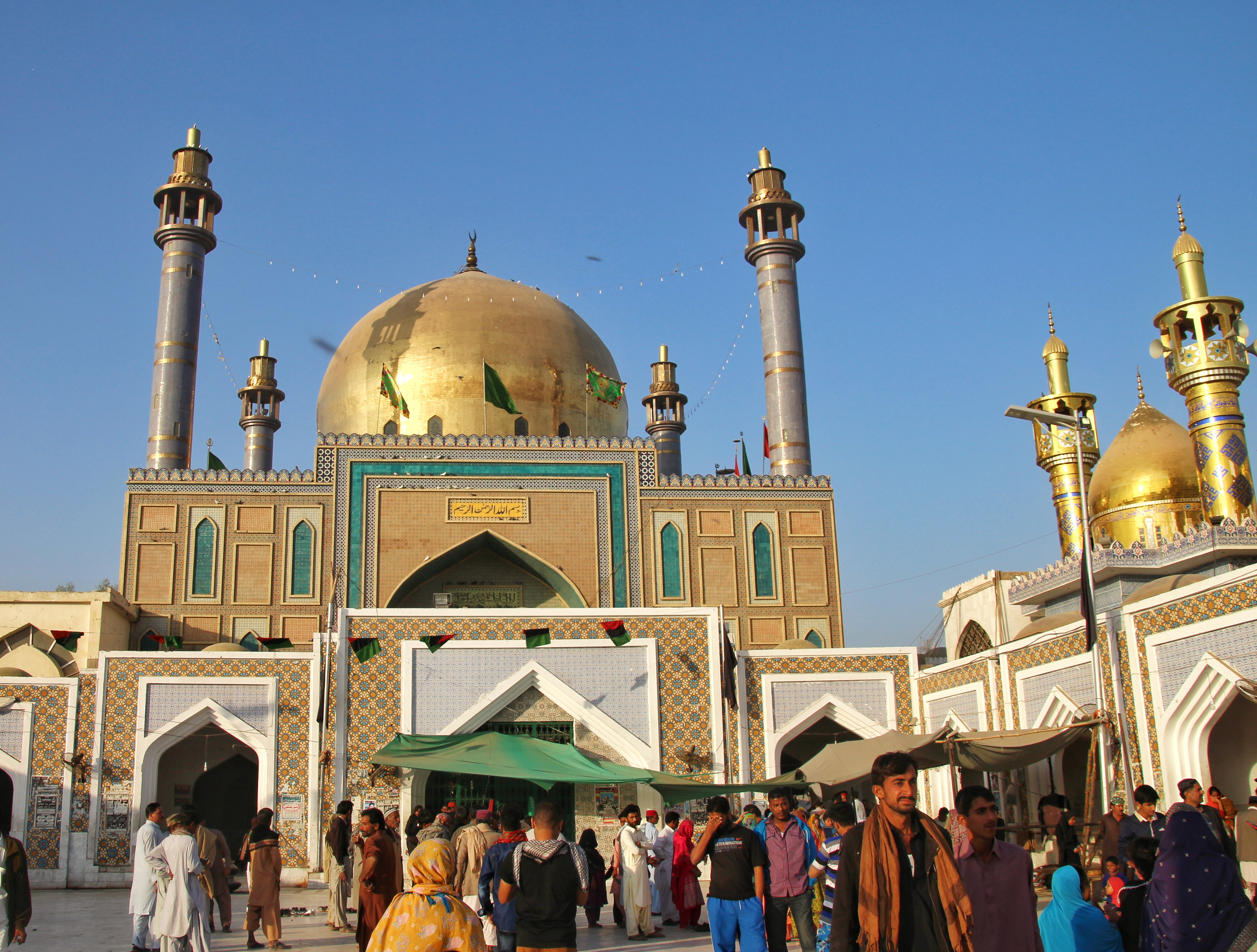
Shrine of Lal Shahbaz Qalandar, Sehwan Sharif, Sindh

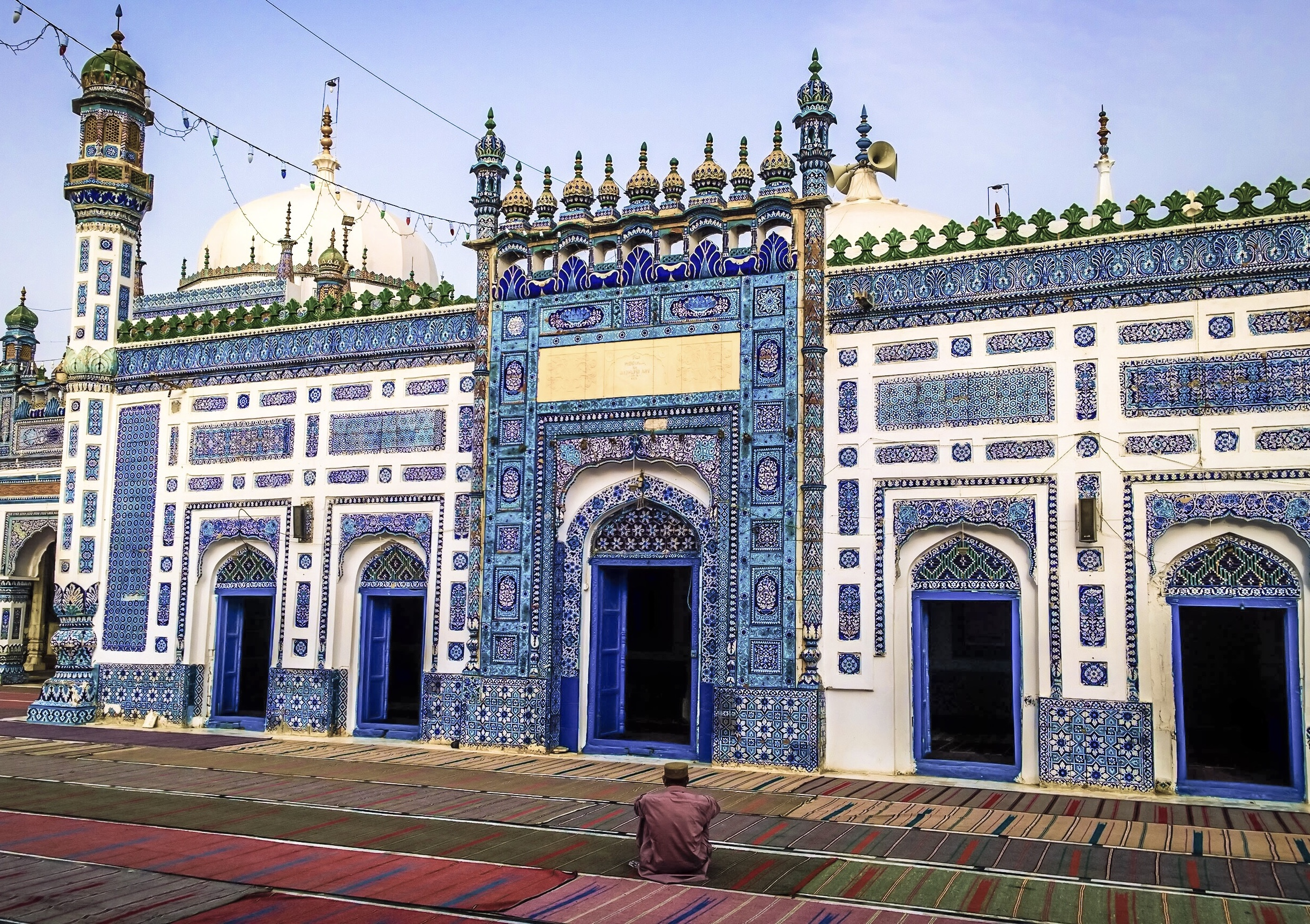
Grand mausoleum of Shah Abdul Latif Bhittai built by Mian Ghulam Shah Kalhoro in 1762 Shrine of Pir Hadi Hassan Bux Shah Jilani duthro sharf, Sanghar, Sindh

Sufism, known as Tasawwuf in the Arabic-speaking world, is a form of Islamic mysticism that emphasizes introspection and spiritual closeness with God. About 60% of Muslims in Pakistan regard themselves as followers of Sufi saints.

== Sufi traditions ==
Most of the Sufis in Pakistan relate to the four main tariqa (silsila): Chishti, Naqshbandi, Qadiri-Razzaqi and Suhrawardi.

Chishti Sufism traditions include devotional rituals and repeating the name of God through qawwali songs or in speech. As part of a tradition of humanitarian work and community service, Chishti centres provide shelter, food, and medical aid for people in need, of any background.

== Contemporary influence ==
There are two levels of Sufism in Pakistan. The first is the 'populist Sufism' of the rural population. This level of Sufism involves belief in intercession through saints, veneration of their shrines and forming bonds with a pir (spiritual guide). Many rural Pakistani Muslims associate with pirs and seek their intercession. The second level of Sufism in Pakistan is 'intellectual Sufism' which is growing among the urban and educated population. They are influenced by the writings of Sufis such as the medieval theologian al-Ghazali, the Sufi reformer Shaykh Aḥmad Sirhindi and Shah Wali Allah.

== Attacks on Sufi shrines ==
Since March 2005, 209 people have been killed and 560 injured in 29 different terrorist attacks targeting shrines devoted to Sufi saints in Pakistan, according to data compiled by the Center for Islamic Research Collaboration and Learning (CIRCLe). The attacks are generally attributed to banned militant organisations.

The Sehwan Sharif shrine was the site of a suicide bombing in 2017 carried out by the Islamic State.

== See also ==
- Islam in Pakistan
- Sufism in Punjab
- Sufism in Sindh
- List of Sufi saints
- Shadhiliyya
- Kubrawiyyah

== Bibliography ==
- Chopra, R. M. (1999). Great Sufi Poets of the Punjab. Calcutta: Iran Society. LCCN 2007343404. OCLC 56847668.
- Chopra, R. M. (2016). Sufism (Origin, Growth, Eclipse, Resurgence). New Delhi: Anuradha Prakashan. ISBN 978-93-85083-52-5.
- Dahlén, Ashk (2004). "The Holy Fool in Medieval Islam: The Qalandarīyāt of Fakhr al-dīn 'Arāqī". Orientalia Suecana. 53: 63–81. ISSN 0078-6578.
- De Bruijn, J. T. P. (1999) [1992]. "The Qalandariyyāt in Persian Mystical Poetry, from Sanāʾī Onwards". In Lewisohn, Leonard (ed.). The Heritage of Sufism, Volume II: The Legacy of Medieval Persian Sufism (1150–1500). Oxford: Oneworld Publications. pp. 75–86. ISBN 978-1-85168-189-1.
