= Baba Lasoori Shah =

- Born: 1854
- Died: 7 March 1932 (aged 77–78); Jhang Bazaar Faisalabad, Pakistan
- Occupations: Sufism in Pakistan, Social work For Humanity

The Baba Lasoori Shah (Urdu سائیں محمد بخش المعروف بابا لسوڑی شاہ), also known as Sain Muhammad Bakhsh, was housed in Lyallpur and used to attract native people due to his esoteric qualities. He used to live under a shady tree.

There is a shrine in Faisalabad's Jhang Bazaar area in Pakistan. It is the final resting place of Baba Lasoori Shah, who died there in 1932. It has impacted the local culture, social life and the lives of the worshippers.
